= Alien Pizza Planet =

Restaurant at Disneyland

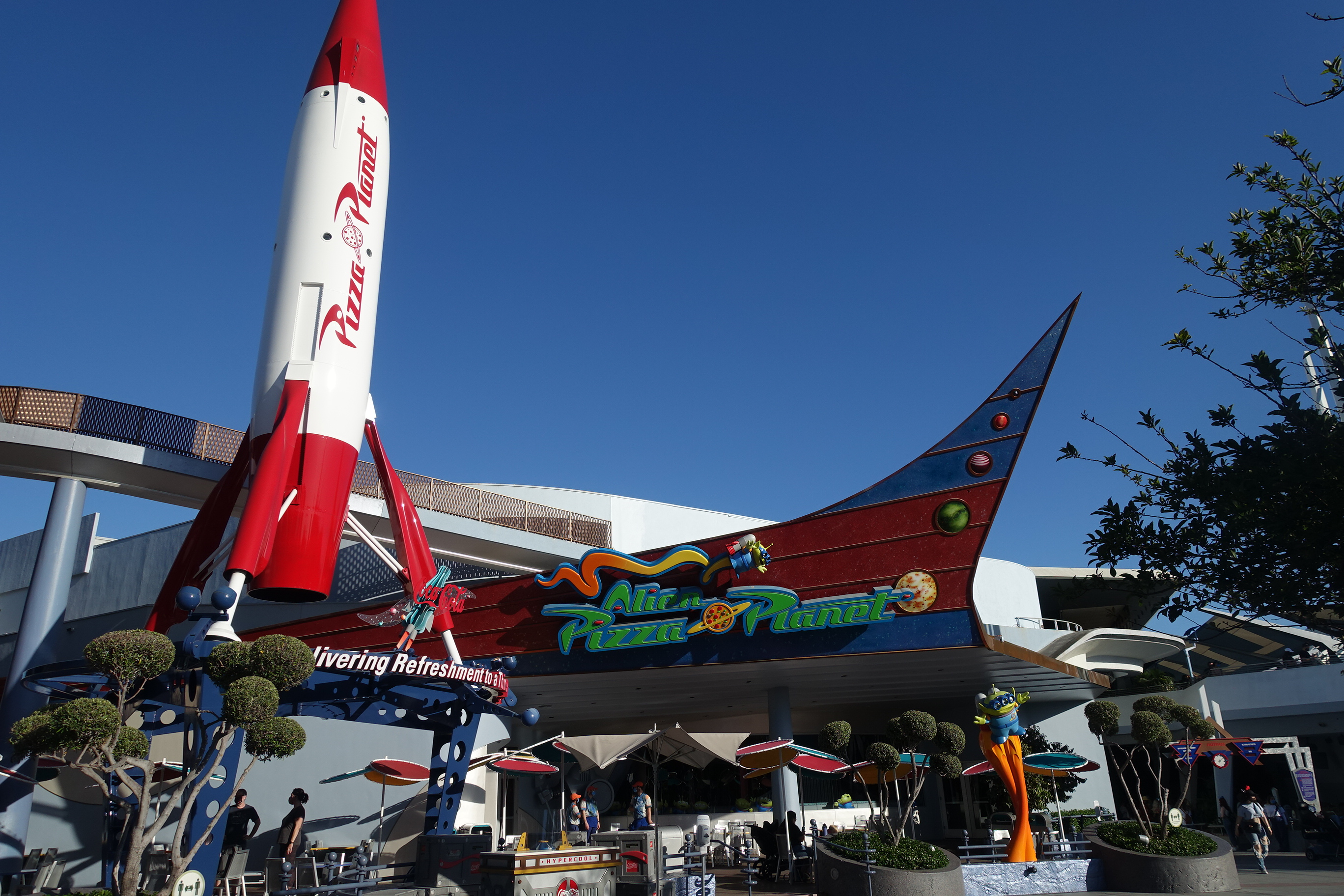

Disneyland
- Area: Tomorrowland
- Coordinates: 33°48′42.2″N 117°55′0.98″W
- Status: Operating
- Opening date: May 22, 1998
- Replaced: Mission to Mars (1975–1992)

Ride statistics
- Theme: Retro Tomorrowland

Alien Pizza Planet is a restaurant located in Tomorrowland at Disneyland in Anaheim, California in the United States. It is across from the Starcade, and directly underneath Space Mountain.

== History ==
The Atomic Age-style restaurant opened as Redd Rockett's Pizza Port on May 22, 1998, the same day as Astro Orbitor, Honey, I Shrunk the Audience, and Rocket Rods, replacing the Mission to Mars attraction. Redd Rockett's closed and re-opened as the Toy Story franchise's Alien Pizza Planet on April 13, 2018, for the temporary Pixar Fest, but has maintained that theming since.

== Design ==
The restaurant uses a mixture of counter service and mobile ordering. It features an Italian cuisine of Pizza, Pasta and Salad. The counter service is divided into three parts, mainly the Pizza Station, the Pasta Station, and the Salad Station. Guests also have a choice to sit outdoors in front of the restaurant, indoor seating in front of the counters, outdoor seating located outside the back door of the restaurant, or even underneath the queue line of Space Mountain.

== Gallery ==
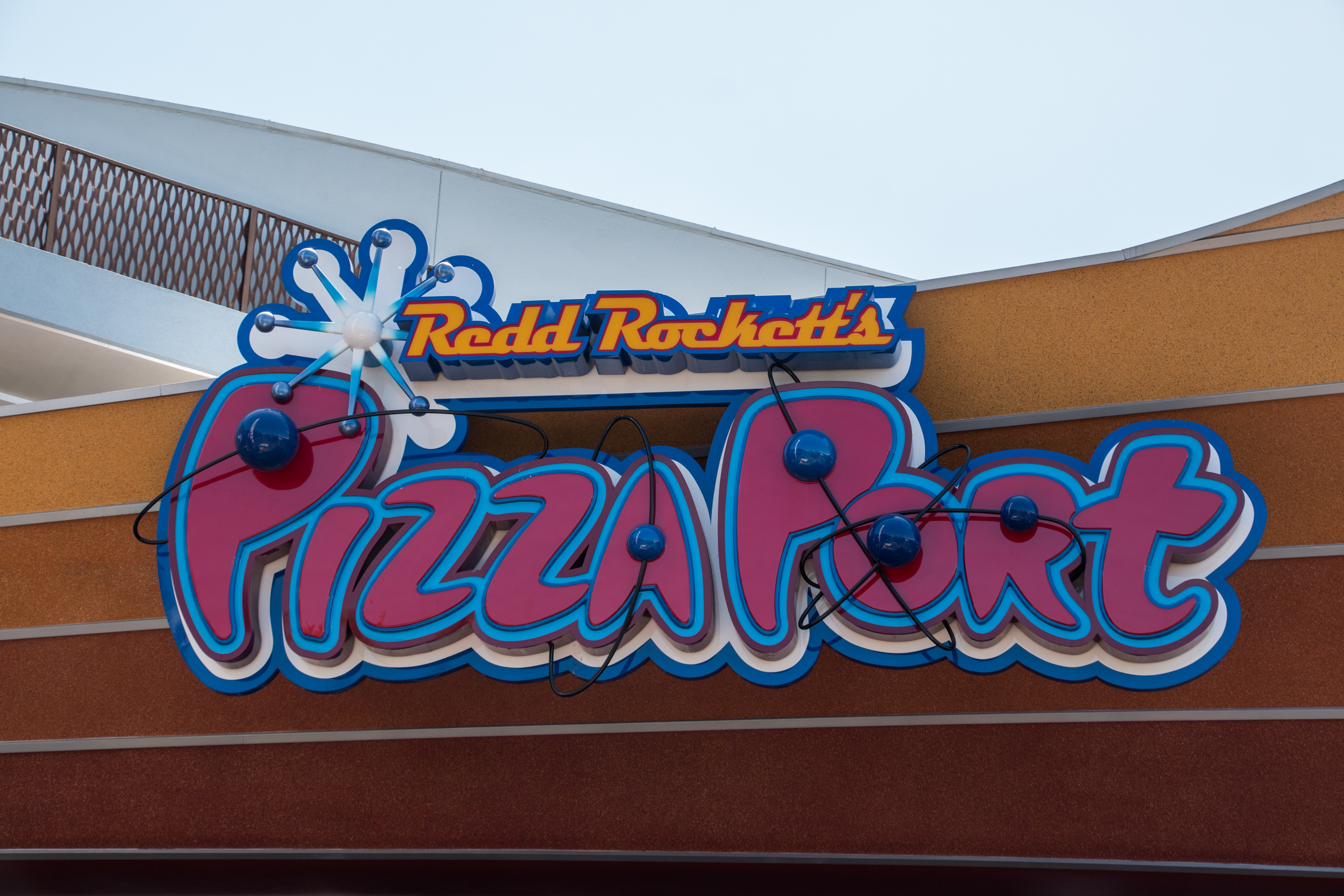
Redd Rockett's Pizza Port signage

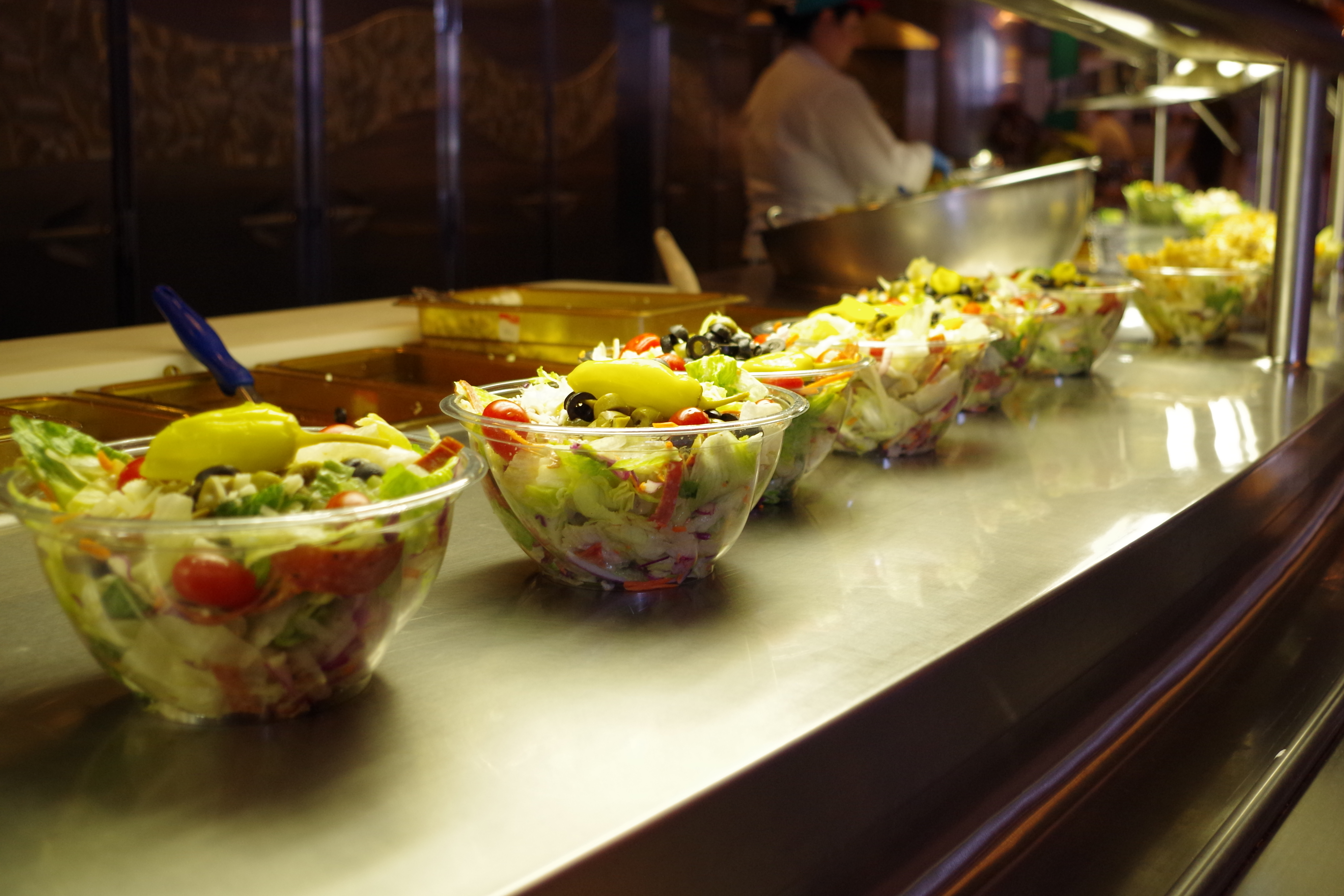
Planetary Pizza Salad
