= Red Baron (ride) =

Amusement ride

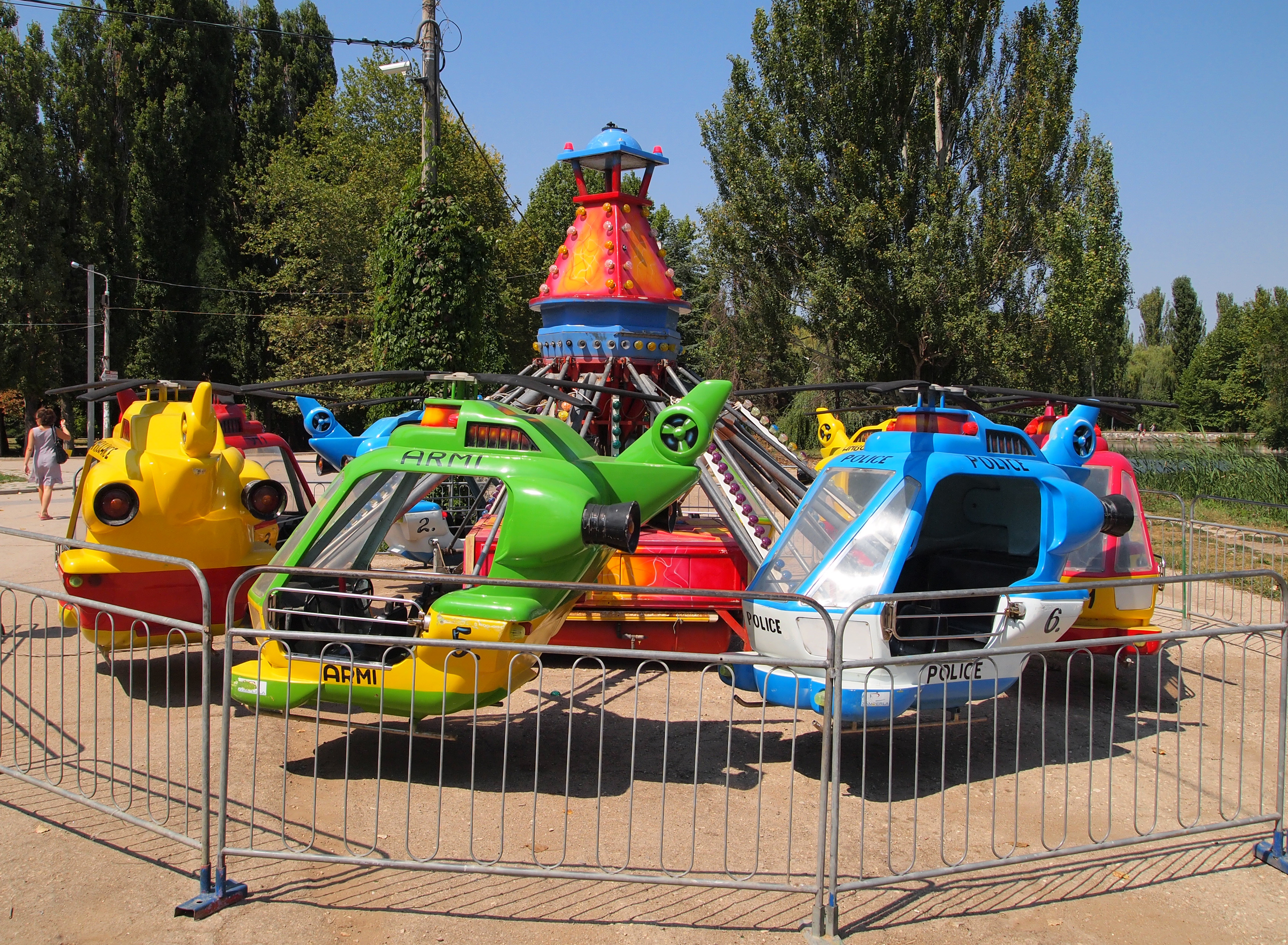

Red Baron is an amusement ride that is primarily intended for small children.

It is a common kiddie ride at many amusement parks, carnivals, and fairs. The rider can move the gondola up and down manually. Many ride manufacturers make this type of ride; the Zamperla's "Mini Jet" is a common model of this ride. The "Mini Jet" ride comes in various themes such as bees, dragons, elephants, airplanes, helicopters, spaceships, etc.

Some of the Red Baron kiddie rides are restricted to only children under 54 inches tall, such as the ones in Cedar Point, Kings Island, and Six Flags Discovery Kingdom. In quite a few other "Red Baron" type kiddie rides, adults and parents are allowed to ride on the rides, such as "The Busy Bees" and "Amazing Flying Elephants" at Dollywood in Pigeon Forge, Tennessee, or at the Red Baron Ride at Funderland in Sacramento, California.

Another place where adults can ride on a Red Baron type ride is at Disneyland and Walt Disney World, where Dumbo the Flying Elephant has been a perennial favorite of not only toddlers, preschoolers and young children, but teenagers, adults and seniors as well, for many years (Disneyland has been around since July 17, 1955 and Walt Disney World since October 1, 1971).

== Manufacturers ==
- Chance Rides - Red Baron
- Preston & Barbieri - Flying Elephants
- SBF Visa Group - Mini Jet
- Zamperla - Mini Jet
- Zierer - Flying Fish
- Garmendale Engineering - Quad Star
- Carron Dreampark - Red Baron

== Appearances ==
- Sonoma TrainTown Railroad in Sonoma, California: Sonoma TrainTown Airlines (circa 1980s-present)
- Dollywood in Pigeon Forge, Tennessee: Busy Bees (2005–present) and Amazing Flying Elephants (2005–present)
- Funderland at William Land Park, Sacramento, California: Red Baron Airplanes (1986–present)
- Kennywood: Red Baron (1979–present)
- TusenFryd: Barneflyene or Røde Baron (1988–present)
- Cedar Point: Red Baron (1999–present in Camp Snoopy) and Sky Fighters (?–present in Kiddy Kingdom)
- Idlewild and Soak Zone: Red Baron (1989–present)
- Universal Studios Florida: Kang & Kodos' Twirl 'n' Hurl (2013–present)
- Universal Kids Resort: Jellyfish Fields Jamboree (2026-present)
- Disney Parks: Dumbo the Flying Elephant (1955–present), Astro Orbiter (formerly "Star Jets"; 1974–present), and The Magic Carpets of Aladdin (2001–present)
- Islands of Adventure: One Fish, Two Fish, Red Fish, Blue Fish (1999–present)
- Kings Island: Snoopy vs. Red Baron (?-present)

=== Chance Rides "Red Baron" appearances ===
- Six Flags St. Louis: Bugs Bunny Ranger Pilots (1975–present)

=== SBF Visa Group "Mini Jet" appearances ===
- Dreamworld: Big Red Plane (Wiggles-themed; 1999–present)

=== Zamperla "Mini Jet" appearances ===
- Cedar Point: Snoopy's Space Race (space themed; 2008–present in Planet Snoopy)
- Chessington World of Adventures: Flying Jumbos (elephant-themed; 1987–present)
- Darien Lake: Critter Chase (animal-themed; 1988–1997, 2010–present)
- Idlewild and Soak Zone: Dino Soars (dinosaur-themed; ?–present)
- Kennywood: Elephant Parade (elephant-themed; 1987–present)
- Sea World: Air Sea Explorer (1999–present)
- Six Flags Discovery Kingdom: Tava's Elephant Parade (elephant-themed; 2006–present)
- Méga-Parc: Condor (formerly "Baron Rouge", Red baron themed; 1988–2017, Steam Punk themed; 2019-present)

=== Past appearances ===
- Darien Lake: Raft Adventures ("Mini Jet" raft-themed; 1996–2009)
- Dreamworld: Dora the Explorer's Sea Planes (Zamperla Mini Jet; 1983–2010)
- Disneyland: Rocket Jets (1967–1997)
- Disney's Animal Kingdom: TriceraTop Spin (2001–2025)
- Fantasy Island: Red Baron (?–2019)
- Oakwood Theme Park: Aerodrome (1992–2024)
