= Tomorrowland (Disney Parks) =

Themed land at Disney theme parks

- Disneyland's Tomorrowland at night
- Theme: Future, science, technology, outer space, discovery and science fiction

Disneyland
- Status: Operating
- Opened: July 17, 1955

Magic Kingdom
- Status: Operating
- Opened: October 1, 1971

Tokyo Disneyland
- Status: Operating
- Opened: April 15, 1983

Disneyland Paris
- Status: Operating
- Opened: April 12, 1992

Hong Kong Disneyland
- Status: Operating
- Opened: September 12, 2005

Shanghai Disneyland
- Status: Operating
- Opened: June 16, 2016

Tomorrowland is one of the many "themed lands" featured at all of the Magic Kingdom styled Disney theme parks around the world owned or licensed by the Walt Disney Company. Each version of the land is different and features numerous attractions that depict views of the future. Disneyland Park in Paris includes a similar area called Discoveryland, which shares some elements with other Tomorrowlands but emphasizes visions of the future inspired by Jules Verne.

Walt Disney was known for his futurist views and, through his television programs, showed the American public how the world was moving into the future. Tomorrowland was the realized culmination of his views. In his own words: "Tomorrow can be a wonderful age. Our scientists today are opening the doors of the Space Age to achievements that will benefit our children and generations to come. The Tomorrowland attractions have been designed to give you an opportunity to participate in adventures that are a living blueprint of our future."

Disneyland's Tomorrowland is now in its third generation, and the Magic Kingdom's Tomorrowland is in its second. The Walt Disney Company has mentioned that it wanted to keep Tomorrowland from becoming "Yesterdayland". As a self-referential joke along this line, the 2007 Walt Disney Animation Studios film Meet the Robinsons (which is set mainly in the year 2037) features an amusement park called Todayland, which has rides that look similar to Space Mountain and Disneyland's original Rocket Jets.

== Disneyland ==
Original dedication

A vista into a world of wondrous ideas, signifying Man's achievements... A step into the future, with predictions of constructed things to come. Tomorrow offers new frontiers in science, adventure and ideals. The Atomic Age, the challenge of Outer Space and the hope for a peaceful, unified world.

During the dedication, Walt Disney started speaking, was told that he wasn't yet on air, and then had to restart once the television viewers were watching.

=== History ===
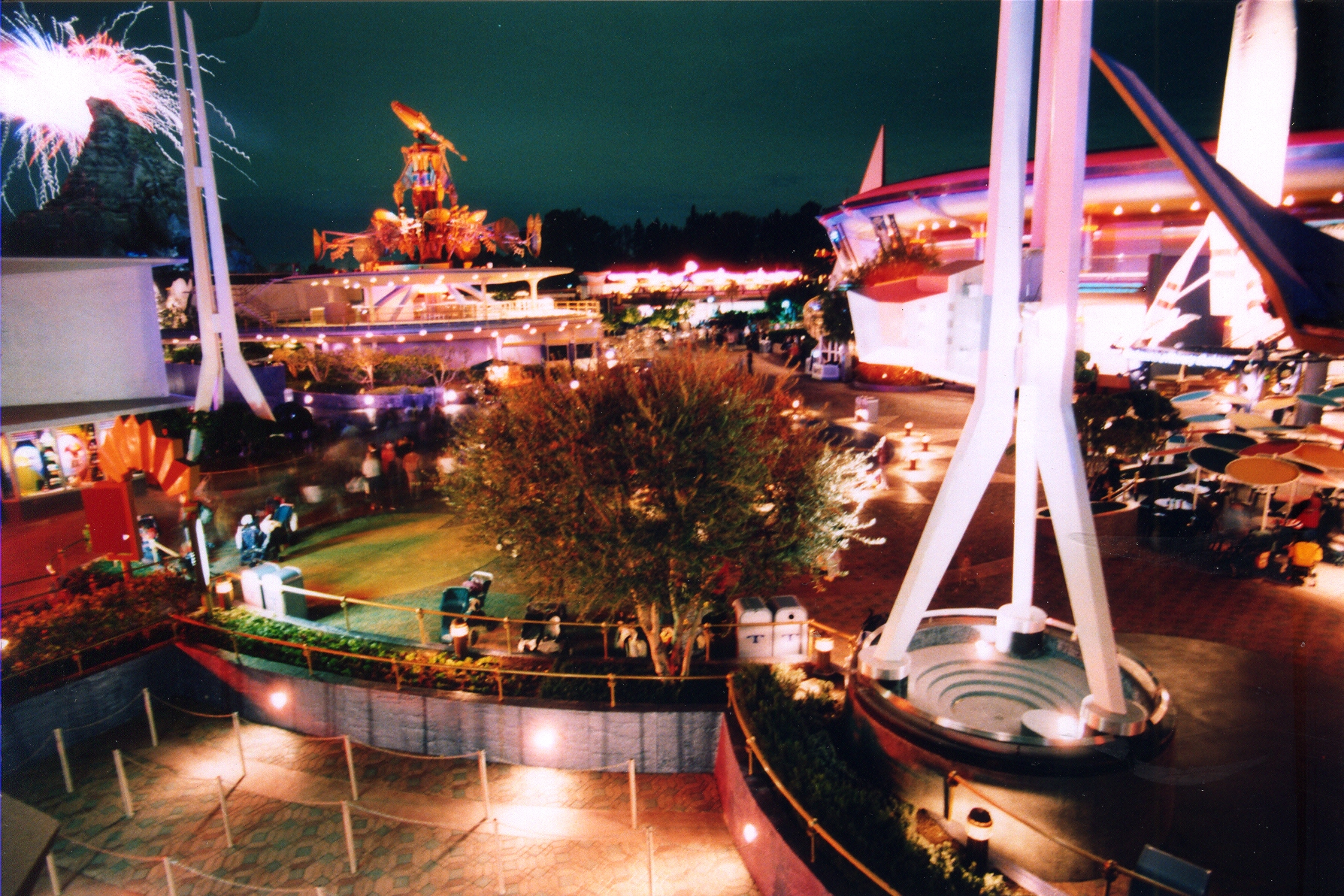
Tomorrowland taken from the Space Mountain queue in 2008

==== First Tomorrowland 1955–1966: The "original" Tomorrowland incarnation ====
The first Tomorrowland opened at Disneyland on July 17, 1955, with only several of its planned attractions open, due to budget cuts. The construction of the park was rushed, so Tomorrowland was the last land to be finished. It became something of a corporate showcase, despite Walt Disney's reluctance. Monsanto Company, American Motors, Richfield Oil, and Dutch Boy Paint were some of the many companies to open showcases in Tomorrowland in the first few years.

Since the park was on a strict budget, one cost-cutting idea was to reuse the sets of the Nautilus from Disney's 1954 movie 20,000 Leagues Under the Sea as a walkthrough attraction. This remained open until 1966. For the first four years, most of Tomorrowland was generally open space and considered to be very corporate-fueled.

When Disneyland opened, Tomorrowland imagined the future, of the year 1986.

Tomorrowland's showpiece was the TWA Moonliner, derived from Disney's "Man In Space" television episodes developed in the 1950s. The Moonliner was the tallest structure in the park at the time, even taller than the park icon Sleeping Beauty Castle. The Moonliner hosted Rocket To The Moon which was a ride to the moon. The entrance showpiece was the clock of the world showing the time anywhere on earth. The north show building hosted Circarama U.S.A. which showed 360° movies on nine screens, like a moving cyclorama, and space station X-1 which showed a satellite view of America. The south show building showed the Monsanto Hall of Chemistry, which was a walk-through tour about chemistry. Autopia, an opening-day attraction, gave visitors a view of the National Interstate System that was to be built in the future. The attraction still remains open today, though it has been modified and rebuilt several times. This is the only attraction in Tomorrowland that has been open since opening day.

Several new attractions opened in 1955. Among them were Tomorrowland Boats, The World Beneath Us, which showed the Earth's geology, and the Aluminum Hall of Fame, sponsored by Kaiser Aluminum. The final Tomorrowland attraction to open in 1955 was The Flight Circle which demonstrated methanol-powered model planes, boats and cars.

In 1956, Tomorrowland Boats were renamed Phantom Boats, and were closed later in the year. Dutch Boy Color Gallery opened in 1956, sponsored by Dutch Boy Paint. Two major attractions opened in 1956: the Astro Jets, where guests were able to fly their own rockets, and Skyway to Fantasyland, where guests rode "Buckets" over to Fantasyland.

In 1957, the Monsanto House of the Future, a plastic house with four wings cantilevered from a central plinth, was built. This was similar to precursors at previous World's Fairs, though those were simply homes furnished with modern conveniences and aimed at housewives. Disneyland's attraction displayed conveniences such as picture phones and television remote controls, and it introduced many people to their first microwave oven. The Viewliner Train of Tomorrow also opened where guests could ride in "the fastest miniature train in the world." It closed the next year making it the shortest lived Disney attraction ever.

In 1959, three major attractions, the park's first billed E-ticket attractions, opened at Tomorrowland. These were Disneyland Monorail, Submarine Voyage, and Matterhorn Bobsleds (which later became part of Fantasyland). These additions were collectively so large in scope that they were televised as the second opening of Disneyland. New attractions came and some went as Walt Disney focused his efforts on the 1964–65 New York World's Fair. After the Fair closed, he turned his attention to a new Tomorrowland and the Florida Project, which would later become Walt Disney World.

==== Tomorrowland 1967–1997: "New Tomorrowland" ====
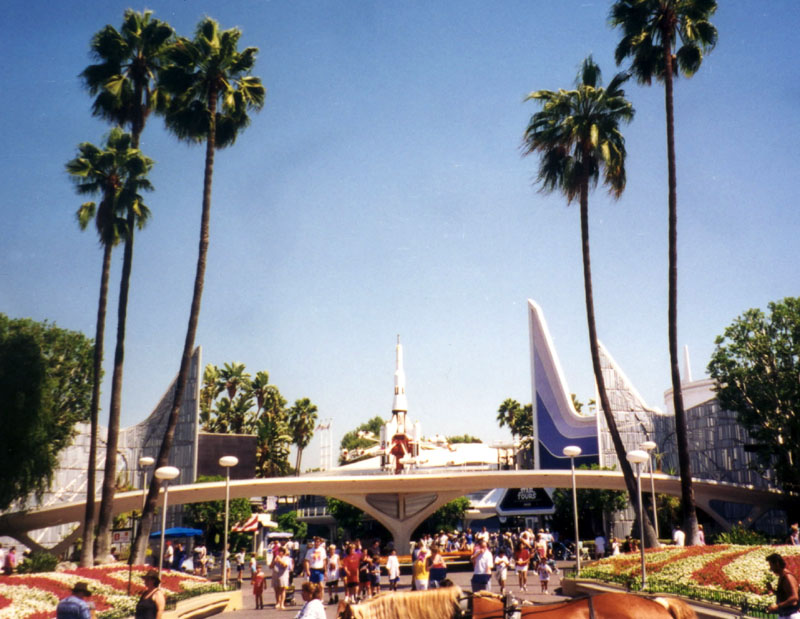
Disneyland's Tomorrowland entrance in 1996, before the 1998 makeover

By 1966, Tomorrowland was becoming quickly outdated. Most of its attractions were only there as advertisements for various sponsors, such as Monsanto, despite the 1959 Tomorrowland expansion. In 1967, the area was completely rebuilt with new attractions and scenery. The original layout was demolished, with a few exceptions, and a new set of buildings were erected. The addition of the Carousel of Progress, Adventure Thru Inner Space, an improved and larger Circle-Vision auditorium, Flight to the Moon, and the PeopleMover helped give Tomorrowland its "World on the Move" theme.

In 1973, "The World On The Move" began to change. General Electric decided to close Carousel of Progress, which later reopened at a new home in Walt Disney World in 1975 as part of its expansion. In 1974, with the American Bicentennial approaching, Disney designers seized the opportunity of the vacant carousel theater to present a large musical extravaganza called America Sings, which featured 114 Audio Animatronics. The following year, Flight to the Moon was updated into Mission to Mars, as actual flights to the moon had become a reality since the former's construction.

In 1975, construction began on Walt Disney's proposed 1965 "Space Port". In May 1977, this project opened to the public as Space Mountain. The same year, the Super Speed Tunnel was added as part of the Peoplemover experience, as the Epcot model that was formerly in the building moved to Florida.

In 1984, Circle-Vision 360 received a brand new travelogue of the United States, to replace the aging "America The Beautiful" film – American Journeys.

In 1986, two new attractions found homes in Tomorrowland: Star Tours and Captain EO. Captain EO replaced the Space Stage in September 1986, and Star Tours replaced Adventure Thru Inner Space in January 1987. Aside from the Skyway closing in 1994, Tomorrowland remained largely unchanged for much of the following decade until it was redesigned in 1998.

In 1993, The Walt Disney Company planned a major refurbishment, "Tomorrowland 2055". This Tomorrowland was planned to have more of an extraterrestrial theme, and was going to replace Mission to Mars with ExtraTERRORestrial Alien Encounter. In 1994, however, this plan was scrapped due to the poor initial financial performance of Euro Disneyland.

==== Tomorrowland 1995–1998: "Tomorrowland in Decline" ====
From 1995 to 1998 several Tomorrowland attractions were slated to be closed or remodeled. The Peoplemover, The Rocket Jets, Mission to Mars, Circle-Vision 360, Captain EO, and the Starcade were all permanently closed or planned for renovation. At this time, most of these attractions were left vacant or walled off from the public.

In 1995, the cost of an adult day pass at Disneyland was $34.00 ($72 in 2025 dollars), and a Disneyland Annual Pass was $99.00 ($209 in 2025 dollars). There was only one type of annual pass—as opposed to the current tiered system—and many Southern California locals had passes. Tomorrowland quickly became a local hangout for many local junior high and high school teenagers residing in Southern California. Teenagers congregated near the Tomorrowland Terrace, which featured a live band every night.

Tomorrowland became so synonymous with Southern California teenagers at that time, popular bands began to reference the local scene in their music. Local Anaheim-area ska-rock group No Doubt named their 1995 breakthrough third album “Tragic Kingdom”, in which the final track (also entitled Tragic Kingdom) begins with the ambient sounds of faint music and park guests boarding Snow White's Scary Adventures, and an ominous, pre-recorded male voice announces "Remain seated please; permanecer sentados por favor..." Just as the song begins, the iconic scream of the Wicked Witch falling to her death (as in the Disney film Snow White and the Seven Dwarfs) can be heard. The first verse of the song says "Once was a magical place; over time it was lost. Price increased the cost, and now the fortune of the kingdom is locked up in its dungeon vaults." In reference to Disneyland's Main Street Electrical Parade, another section laments "The parade that's electrical, it serves no real purpose; Just takes up a lot of juice, just to impress us."

Ska band Jeffries Fan Club (1997) wrote a song called "12" about a high school boy who meets a 12-year-old girl at Disneyland, and Pop-Punk band the Ataris’ (1998) "San Dimas High School Football Rules" was about the lead singer going to Disneyland with a girl he met and getting on all the rides.

This influx of teenagers did cause some negative consequences to the park. Disneyland had to employ more security because many of the teenagers were not respectful to the families visiting the park. To combat the issue of mischievous locals, Disneyland made minor changes, including an increase to both one-day and annual passes. Tomorrowland officially began its renovation in 1995. The three-year makeover started only two years after the park's last major project: the construction of Mickey's Toontown. The land was not completely closed off the entire time, but major sections were blocked off to guests, and the entrance was finally walled up in 1997. As construction continued, rumors about possible new attractions went rampant. Guests wondered if Tomorrowland would start to phase out transportation and space travel attractions (its second main focus after home technologies in the 50s) in favor of a brand new theme. By the first months of 1998, New Tomorrowland was at the forefront of every Disneyland fan's mind, and the springtime opening drew major crowds. When Tomorrowland re-opened Disneyland had raised prices and many of the locals either moved on or aged out of using Tomorrowland as a hangout.

==== Tomorrowland 1998–2004: The "New-New Tomorrowland" incarnation ====
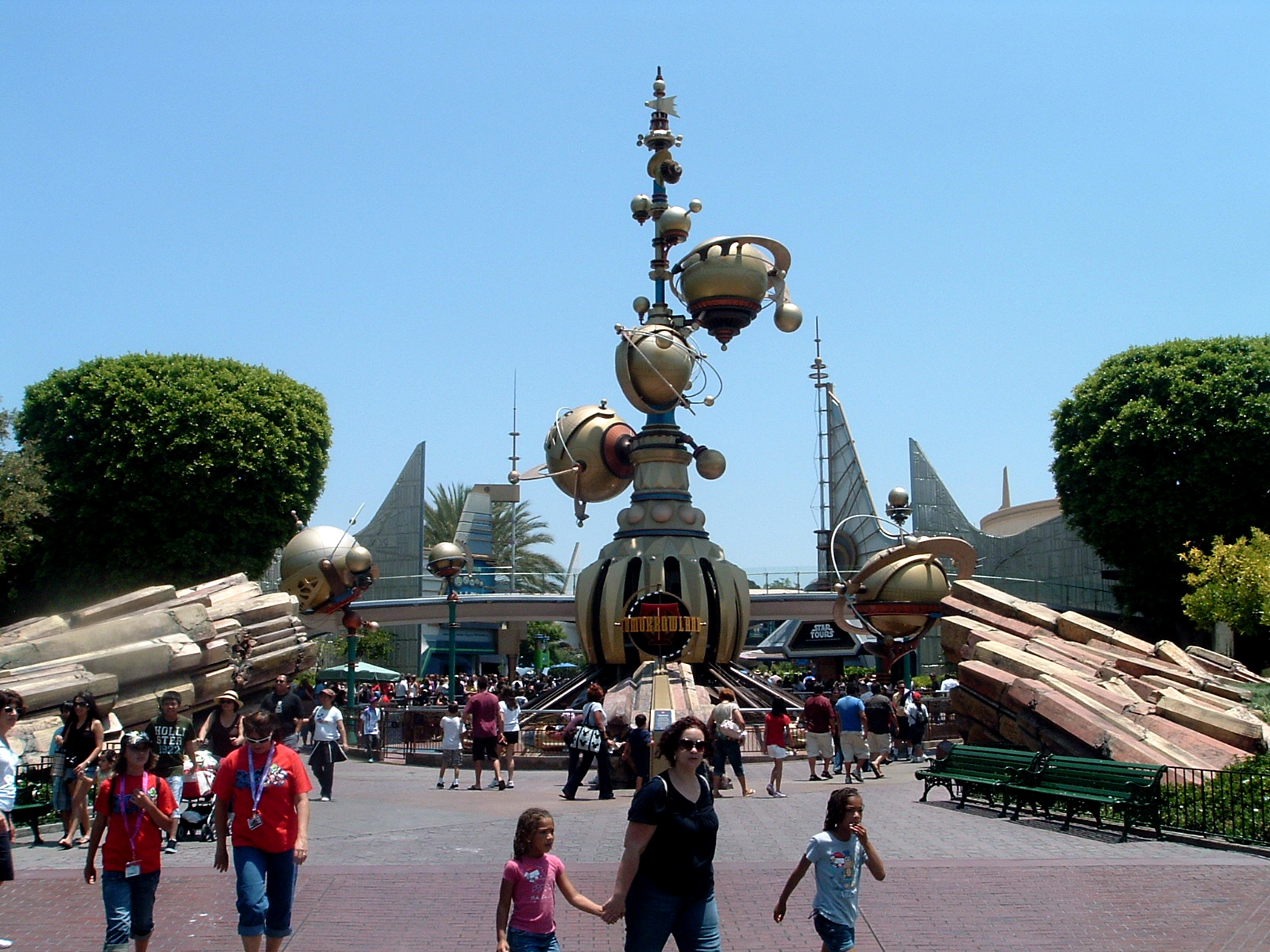
Disneyland's Tomorrowland entrance in 2008

Tomorrowland reopened on May 22, 1998, at the cost of a mere $100 million ($197,529,604 in 2025 dollars), as the land was hit with budget cuts from Disneyland's president at the time, Paul Pressler. It is loosely based on the retro-futurist concepts of Jules Verne that Disneyland Paris's Discoveryland featured. The entire land was painted in bronzes, golds, and dark browns, with occasional green highlights. New landscaping featured apparent vegetable plots and made reference to "neo-agrarian" concepts. The flagship attraction of the makeover was the Rocket Rods, which attempted to run a fast-paced ride on the former slow-paced PeopleMover track; the ride closed two years later due to intractable mechanical problems.

Many of the attractions remained fundamentally the same, but Circle-Vision, Captain EO, and Mission to Mars were all removed. The space formerly occupied by Circle-Vision was partly used for the queue of the Rocket Rods, while Captain EO was replaced by Honey, I Shrunk the Audience! and Mission To Mars was replaced by a restaurant called Redd Rockett's Pizza Port. The Rocket Jets attraction was redressed as a moving sculpture called the Observatron, while a similar attraction called the Astro Orbiter was placed at ground level in the entrance of Tomorrowland where the World Clock once stood. The former America Sings theater became Innoventions, a technology showcase based on the Walt Disney World: EPCOT original. The famous Tomorrowland attraction Space Mountain, which had been a gleaming white color for more than twenty years, was re-painted a copperish-brown color to go along with the redesign of Tomorrowland.

Following the opening of the New Tomorrowland for the summer of 1998, the Submarine Voyage was closed in September.

In late 2003, Matt Ouimet became president of the Disneyland Resort and sought to change some of the cost-cutting trends that had become the status quo there. Space Mountain was closed for two full years while the ride was refurbished and repainted white, the original color of the attraction, and the track was completely replaced by a new track with the same track plan. The former Rocket Rods queue building was converted into Buzz Lightyear Astro Blasters for a 2005 opening.

==== Tomorrowland 2005–2016: Disneyland's Happiest Homecoming and Diamond Anniversary ====
In February 2005, Walt Disney Imagineering approved a repaint of Tomorrowland for the "Happiest Homecoming on Earth" 50th anniversary celebration. This new paint scheme resembled the 1967 Tomorrowland with predominantly white, blue, and silver, although some of the former gold and bronze colors were kept. The largest remainder from the 1998 color scheme was the Astro Orbitor until mid-2009, when it was repainted to match the rest of the land, and mechanisms that once caused its top to rotate properly were repaired.

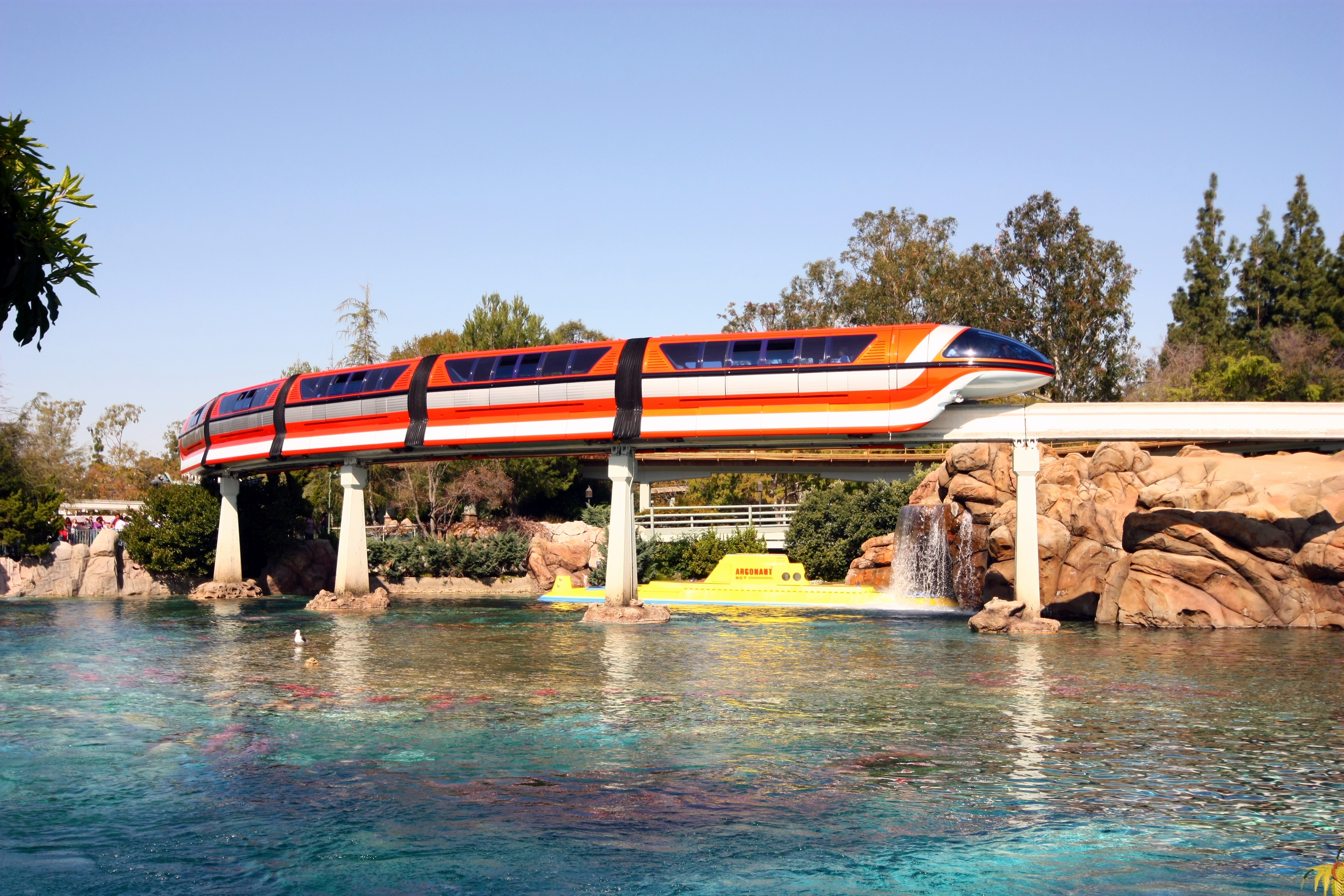
The Submarine Lagoon at Tomorrowland. Monorail Orange is passing over a submarine.

In 2007, as part of the Year of a Million Dreams, the Submarine Voyage reopened as Finding Nemo Submarine Voyage, with the submarines fully refurbished and repowered with batteries rather than diesel engines and the theme based on the 2003 Disney/Pixar animated film Finding Nemo.

Also in 2007, the Disneyland Monorail began phasing out its Mark V fleet of monorails in order to reverse engineer and upgrade the Mark V's to the new Mark VII models. The new Mark VII's were phased in one at a time, beginning with Red and Blue in 2008 and Orange in 2009; Purple was confirmed not to undergo an upgrade and was scrapped. These new monorails were to pay homage to the original Mark I, II, and III monorails while retaining a modern, futuristic look. The previous Mark V monorail class of trains bore more of a resemblance to the Mark IV and Mark VI monorail classes of trains used on the Walt Disney World Monorail System.

In January 2010, Honey, I Shrunk the Audience! closed to make way for a revived Captain EO, which "re-opened" due to the large public backing the 3D film had received upon Michael Jackson's death in June 2009. It was a limited engagement (albeit with no set closing date), and eventually closed in July 2014 to use the theatre to present a preview of Marvel Studios' Guardians of the Galaxy. Later, starting on 26 September 2014, the Magic Eye theatre was used to present a preview of Walt Disney Animation Studios' Big Hero 6, set to have ended on 21 November 2014.

In July 2010, Disneyland's Star Wars-themed motion simulator attraction Star Tours was closed to make way for Star Tours - The Adventures Continue. The ride, which featured other Star Wars destinations in 3-D, opened on June 3, 2011.

On March 21, 2015 Innoventions closed to become transformed into the Tomorrowland Expo Center. The building was closed and converted which reopened to guests on November 16, 2015. The first floor of the building hosts the Star Wars Launch Bay, a new Star Wars exhibit with character meet and greets, displays featuring movie props and various sneak peeks behind the scenes of Star Wars: The Force Awakens and the two other future Star Wars films. The second floor formerly hosted the "Super Hero HQ", featuring meet and greets with Marvel characters Iron Man, Thor and Spider-Man with several displays from Innoventions remaining, but redressed to display Marvel's various television series and comic strips.

==== Tomorrowland 2016–present: The "Season of the Force" Tomorrowland incarnation ====
At the 2015 D23 Expo, Disney announced that on November 16, 2015, Tomorrowland would launch a Star Wars-themed "Season of the Force", in celebration of Star Wars: The Force Awakens. Among the changes launched as part of the event were the attraction Star Wars Launch Bay—an exhibition showcasing artwork and other materials related to the franchise, a Star Wars Rebels-themed update of Jedi Training Academy known as Jedi Training: Trials of the Temple, the addition of The Force Awakens-related content to Star Tours - The Adventures Continue, and a The Force Awakens-themed Space Mountain overlay known as Hyperspace Mountain. Autopia also closed for a short period of time, but reopened in early 2016, with a new blue and silver color scheme to better fit current day Tomorrowland and a new sponsorship with Honda. In 2019, Disneyland began to remove the 1998-era Tomorrowland sign and rockwork in order to widen walkways and improve crowd flow as part of its ongoing Project Stardust beautification and improvement project.

During the D23 fan event in 2026, it was announced that Tomorowland will be reimagined with new attractions and open spaces.

=== Attractions and entertainment ===
- Astro Orbiter (1998–present)
- Autopia (1955–present)
- Buzz Lightyear Astro Blasters (2005–present)
- Disneyland Monorail (1959–present)
- Disneyland Railroad (1955–present)
  - Tomorrowland Station
- Finding Nemo Submarine Voyage (2007–present)
- Space Mountain (1977–present)
- Star Tours – The Adventures Continue (2011–present)
- Stitch's Interplanetary Beach Party Blast (2022–present)
- Tomorrowland Theater
  - Pixar Short Film Spotlight (2026–present)

=== Former attractions and entertainment ===
- Court of Honor (1955–1956)
- Phantom Boats (1955–1956)
- 20,000 Leagues Under the Sea Exhibit (1955–1966)
- Hall of Aluminum Fame (1955–1960)
- Space Station X-1 (1955–1960)
- The World Beneath Us (1955–1960)
- Art Corner (1955–1966)
- Clock of the World (1955–1966)
- Flight Circle (1955–1966)
- Hobbyland (1955–1966)
- Monsanto Hall of Chemistry (1955–1966)
- Rocket to the Moon (1955–1966)
- Circle-Vision 360° (1955–1997, re-themed as Rocket Rods Queue)
  - A Tour of the West (1955–1960)
  - America The Beautiful (1960–1984, 1996–1997)
  - Wonders of China (1984–1994)
- American Dairy Association Exhibit (1956–1958)
- Bathroom of Tomorrow (1956–1960)
- Our Future in Colors (1956–1963)
- Astro Jets (1956–1964)
- Avenue of the Flags (1956–1966)
- Skyway to Fantasyland (1956–1994)
- Viewliner Train of Tomorrow (1957–1958)
- Midget Autopia (1957–1966)
- Monsanto House of the Future (1957–1967)
- Mermaids (1959; 1965–1967)
- Submarine Voyage (1959–1998)
- The Art of Animation (1960–1966)
- Bell Telephone Systems Phone Exhibits (1960–1984)
- Flying Saucers (1961–1966)
- New York World's Fair Exhibit (1963–1964)
- Fashions & Fabrics Through the Ages (1965)
- Carousel Theater
  - Carousel of Progress (1967–1973)
- Flight to the Moon (1967–1975)
- Adventure Thru Inner Space (1967–1985)
- Tomorrowland Stage (1967–1986)
- PeopleMover (1967–1995)
- Alpine Gardens (1967–1995)
- Rocket Jets (1967–1997)
- America Sings (1974–1988)
- Mission to Mars (1975–1992)
- Starcade (1977–2015)
- Halyx (1981)
- Magic Eye Theater (1984–2015)
  - Magic Journeys (1984–1986)
  - Captain EO (1986–1997)
  - Honey, I Shrunk the Audience (1998–2010)
  - Captain EO Tribute (2010–2015)
  - Star Wars: Path of the Jedi (2015-2018, 2019-2020)
- Star Tours (1987–2010)
- Toy Story Funhouse (January 27, 1996 – May 27, 1996)
  - Hamm's Theater with "Hamm's All-Doll Revue"
- Rocket Rods (1998–2000)
- Cosmic Waves (1998–2002)
- American Space Experience (1998–2003)
- Innoventions (1998–2015)
- Radio Disney Broadcast Booth (1999–2002)
- Club Buzz (2001–2006)
- Super Hero HQ (2015–2016)
- Jedi Training Academy (2015–2018)
- Star Wars Launch Bay (2015—2020)

=== Characters: Meet and Greet ===
- Mister Fantastic, Invisible Woman, Human Torch, The Thing and H.E.R.B.I.E. from Fantastic Four
- Darth Vader, Chewbacca, Boba Fett and Stormtroopers from Star Wars

=== Restaurants and refreshments ===
- Alien Pizza Planet
- The Spirit of Refreshment
- Tomorrowland Terrace (currently themed as Galactic Grill)

=== Former restaurants and refreshments ===
- Space Bar (1955–1966)
- Yacht Club (1955–1966)
- Space Place (1977–1996)
- Lunching Pad (1977–1998)

=== Shops ===
- Autopia's Winner Circle
- Little Green Men Store Command
- The Star Trader
- Tomorrowlanding

=== Former shops ===
- The MOD Hatter (1958–2006)
- Fun Fotos (1960–1966)
- Premiere Shop (1963–2005)
- Character Shop (1967–1986)

== Magic Kingdom ==
Logo of the themed land at the Magic Kingdom

Planetary adornment atop the Astro Orbiter at Walt Disney World's Magic Kingdom Park

=== History ===
==== Second Tomorrowland: 1971–1994 ====
The second Tomorrowland opened on October 1, 1971, at the Magic Kingdom in the Walt Disney World Resort, Florida, and, like at Disneyland, was opened unfinished. On opening day, there were only two attractions: the Grand Prix Raceway and the Skyway to Fantasyland.

Tomorrowland was noted for being very barren and sterile at this time, due to the land being very flat and undetailed. A large orange wall was located past the two large show buildings, and blocked guests from walking further than the Skyway building. The wall had a small stage built into it, and a large outdoor food court sat adjacent to it to compensate for a lack of food venues at the time. It was removed within two years and the Carousel of Progress took its place.

The largest counter service restaurant in the Magic Kingdom was the Tomorrowland Terrace. America the Beautiful opened in November, and Flight to the Moon opened late on Christmas Eve, 1971, due to technical problems. The south show building received an expansion in 1972, which housed If You Had Wings. The south building was further expanded in 1973, opening the Plaza Pavilion, which was an open-air restaurant, and served as a convenient way of getting from Main Street to Tomorrowland quickly.

In 1973, the plans for Tomorrowland were finalized; and for about two years, construction was a common sight. In 1974, Star Jets, a spinner attraction sat on the WEDWay Peoplemover station. It resembled a Saturn V Rocket like its Disneyland cousin, the Rocket Jets. The ride vehicles between the two had some differences. The Disneyland Rockets were more narrow and resembled the central Saturn V rocket more, while the Magic Kingdom's vehicles look more like jets, hence the name "Star Jets". The Space Bar, another restaurant opened below the Peoplemover station.

The next year, Space Mountain and The Carousel of Progress opened on January 15. This was the first Space Mountain to open. It was the first indoor roller coaster in Florida and was the first roller coaster to have computer aided designs, along with using zoning to have 8 trains on the track at a time. Another Railroad station was planned to be built next to the entrance and exit to Space Mountain, but due to crowds in this area, it was never built. Carousel of Progress opened on the same day, and was similar to Disneyland's version except it rotated in the opposite direction. It also had a different song: instead of "There's a Great Big Beautiful Tomorrow", the song was "The Best Time of Your Life". In June, the second version of the WEDWay Peoplemover opened. This Peoplemover bore resemblance to Disneyland's, but was different, in that it used linear induction motors. This means that guests could not get stuck to the tracks as they could at Disneyland if they happened to fall out of the vehicle. The only moving parts of the vehicles were the wheels and the sliding doors. The track was similar but instead of it being open air and the vehicles having roofs, the opposite is true here. Unlike Disneyland's, the Peoplemover here never changed height.

This Tomorrowland somewhat resembled Disneyland's Tomorrowland at the time, with large white buildings and clean geometric shapes. The triangular buildings at Disneyland were fully realized, and the opening of the Tomorrowland here had two enormous pylons which cascaded water down into the castle moat. Complementing the Pylons were two large blue triangular walls which also released water into the moat. These waterfalls were often shut off as the slightest change of wind could spray water all over guests. In the early 80's the Waterfalls were turned off for good, and a large mosaic was painted on the blue walls, and some blue stripes were painted on the two pylons.

The colors of Tomorrowland were mainly whites complemented with ocher on the outside. The interior of the buildings were accented with reds, oranges, yellows, and browns. In Old Tomorrowland's later years, the outside colors were changed to pinks, and blues around the Peoplemover tracks.

==== New Tomorrowland: 1994–present ====
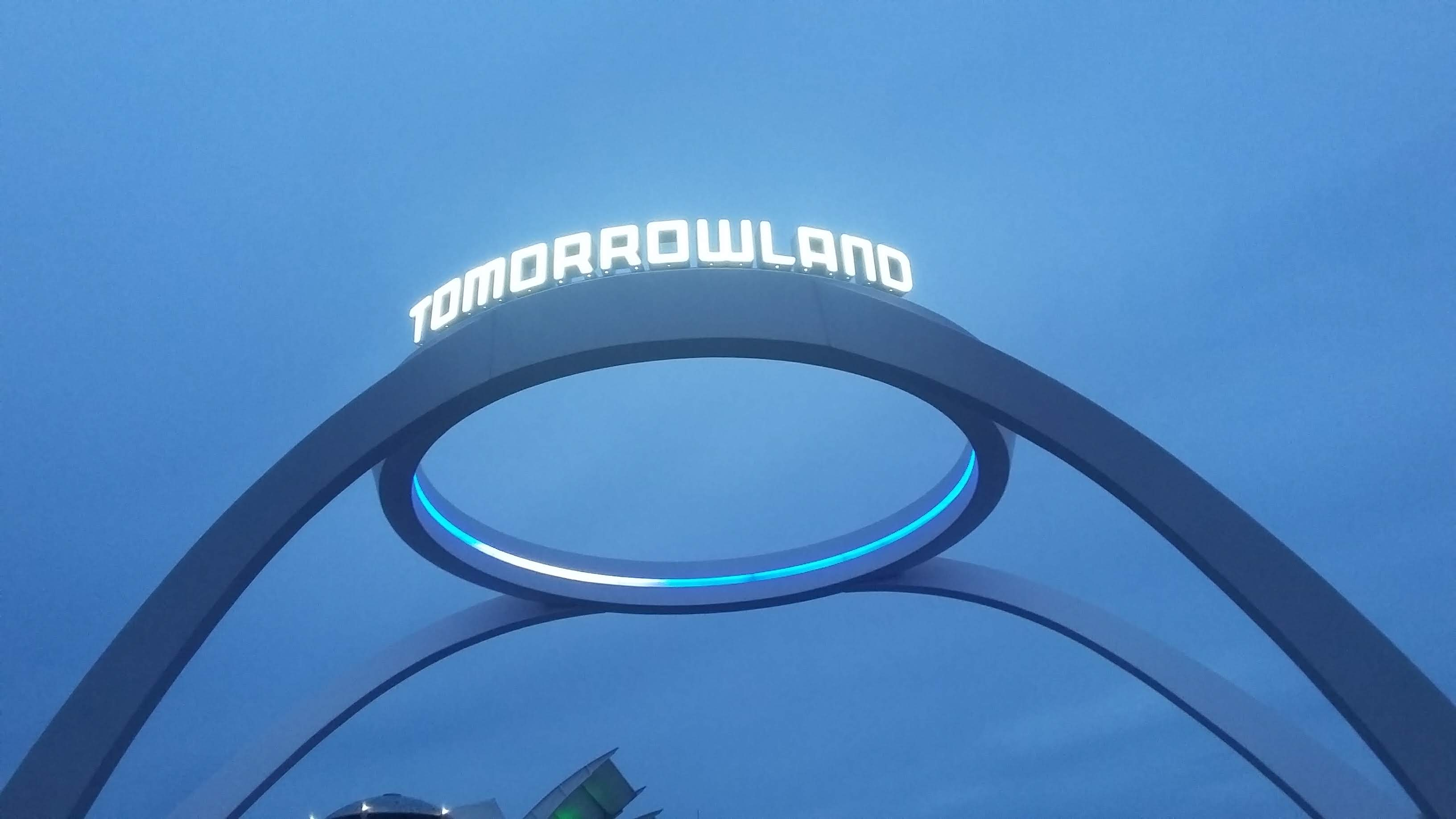
Tomorrowland's new entrance sign

The new Tomorrowland went through a drastic change in 1994. It now resembles Tomorrowland from Disneyland in California slightly, but with more color. Many of the attractions changed. Some classic Tomorrowland attractions that have closed in Disneyland still live on at the Magic Kingdom, including the Tomorrowland Transit Authority PeopleMover (renamed in 2022 to PeopleMover) and the Carousel of Progress, which was moved from Disneyland to Walt Disney World in 1975. A portion of Walt Disney's model display of the Experimental Prototype Community of Tomorrow, the first incarnation of what would become Epcot, is also used as a display visible only from the PeopleMover.

For most of its history, Tomorrowland's color scheme was predominantly white with soft blues, creating a retro-modernist landscape. Huge monolithic towers, spires, and clean lines completed the futuristic look. In 1994, using inspiration from Discoveryland at Disneyland Paris, Tomorrowland was completely re-built and altered to resemble a galactic spaceport as it would have been envisioned by the science-fiction comic strips of the early 20th century, like Flash Gordon and Buck Rogers. Tomorrowland has since been given a much more metallic look, along with new darker blues and purples, especially along its main concourse leading from the central hub.

The spaceship that sat atop the former Cool Scanner misting station was a prop from the 1986 film Flight of the Navigator.

On July 9, 2019, the old entrance sign was removed. On September 17, 2019, a new entrance sign was built.

On October 27, 2020, since Walt Disney World reopened, after being temporarily closed during the ongoing COVID-19 pandemic, Walt Disney World announced that all recent entertainment shows are laid off, such as Citizens of Hollywood at Disney's Hollywood Studios, due to dispute between the Actors' Equity Association and Walt Disney World.

In 2021, following Walt Disney World's reopening, Magic Kingdom announced that a new Halloween live show entitled DJ Dance Party will premiere at Rockettower Plaza Stage during Disney After Hours: BOO Bash in time for Walt Disney World's 50th anniversary celebration. On March 26, 2025, Magic Kingdom announced that the original version of the attraction would be temporarily closed on August 4, 2025 for refurbishment, and it will reopen on April 8, 2026, with new vehicles, blasters, targets, animatronics, and scenes, and a new robot character named "Buddy"., as part of Walt Disney World Resort's 55th anniversary celebration. In August 2025 at Destination D23, it was announced that the Carousel of Progress will be getting an update. This will include a new introductory scene featuring an Audio-Animatronics figure of Walt Disney.

On October 27, 2025, Magic Kingdom announced that Cool Ship was being permanently closed to make way for a new snack stand, AstroFizz, which is opened on November 1, 2025 in Tomorrowland. In May 2026, it was announced that the Carousel of Progress will be close July 6, 2026, for refurbishment, and that it is expected to reopen in 2027, with updated scenes and a shift in the attraction's timeline.

Note:
▲ Genie Plus / Lightning Lane available
≠ Mobile Order for Pickup Available

Quick-Service Food

- Cosmic Ray's Starlight Cafe ≠ - a large indoor location that features Sonny Eclipse, an animatronic lounge singer at the Starlight Lounge. During special events the stage is used for live-performances.
- The Lunching Pad ≠ - an outdoor quick service location.
- Auntie Gravities Galatactic Goodies - an indoor location with seating, specializing in sweet treats and ice-cream.
- Energy Bytes - a Tron-themed snack stand.
- Tomorrowland Terrace - an open-air space used primarily for special events like desert parties that can be purchased
- Joffreys Revive Station - operated by third-party Joffreys Coffee.
- AstroFizz - a new snack stand.

Attractions

- Monsters, Inc. Laugh Floor ▲ - a live comedy show staffed by Actors Equity voice actors and comedians.
- Walt Disney's Carousel of Progress (Reopening in 2027)

Character meet and greets

Rides

- Astro Orbiter
- Buzz Lightyear's Space Ranger Spin ▲
- The Peoplemover
- Space Mountain ▲
- Tomorrowland Speedway ▲
- Tron Lightcycle / Run ▲

Merchandise

- Star Traders (formerly Mickey’s Star Traders)
- Tomorrowland Facepainting Kiosk
- Tomorrowland Launch Depot – specializes in Tron-themed merchandise and includes the Tron Identity Program and a D-Tech Customization and Engraving station.
- Buzz Lightyear's Space Ranger Photos – the gift shop at the exit of the Buzz Lightyear Space Ranger Spin.

Points of Interest

- Rocket Tower Stage / Rocket Tower Plaza – an outdoor live performance space.

=== Former attractions and entertainment ===
- Flight to the Moon (1971–1975)
- Skyway to Fantasyland (1971–1999)
- Circle-Vision 360° (1971–1994)
  - America the Beautiful (1971–1974, 1975–1979)
  - Magic Carpet 'Round The World (1974–1975, 1979–1984)
  - American Journeys (1984–1994)
- Tomorrowland Metropolis Science Center (1994–2006)
  - The Timekeeper (1994–2006)
- If You Had Wings (1972–1987)
- Star Jets (1974–1994)
- Mission to Mars (1975–1993)
- If You Could Fly (1987–1989)
- Delta Dreamflight (1989–1995)
- Extraterrorestrial Alien Encounter (1995–2003)
- Push the Talking Trash Can (1995–2014)
- Tomorrowland Power & Light Co Video Arcade (1995–2015)
- Dreamflight (1996)
- Take Flight (1996–1998)
- Incredible Tomorrowland Expo (2013–2017, 2018)
- iCan Robot (2017–2018)
- Stitch's Great Escape! (2004–2018)
- Rockettower Plaza Stage
  - Mickey's Twas the Night Before Christmas (2000–2008; seasonals)
  - Stitch's Supersonic Celebration (2009)
  - A Totally Tomorrowland Christmas (2009–2023; seasonals)
  - Super Party Time (2013–2017; 2018)
  - Cosmic Dance Party (2017–2018)

=== Former dining ===
- The Lunching Pad (different location) (1971–1994)
- Tomorrowland Terrace Cafe (different location) (1971–1994)
- Plaza Pavilion (1973–1994)
- Space Bar (1974–1994)
- Cool Ship (1994–2025)

=== Former shops ===
- Merchant of Venus
- Space Mountain Shop (Tomorrowland Power & Light)

== Tokyo Disneyland ==
=== History ===
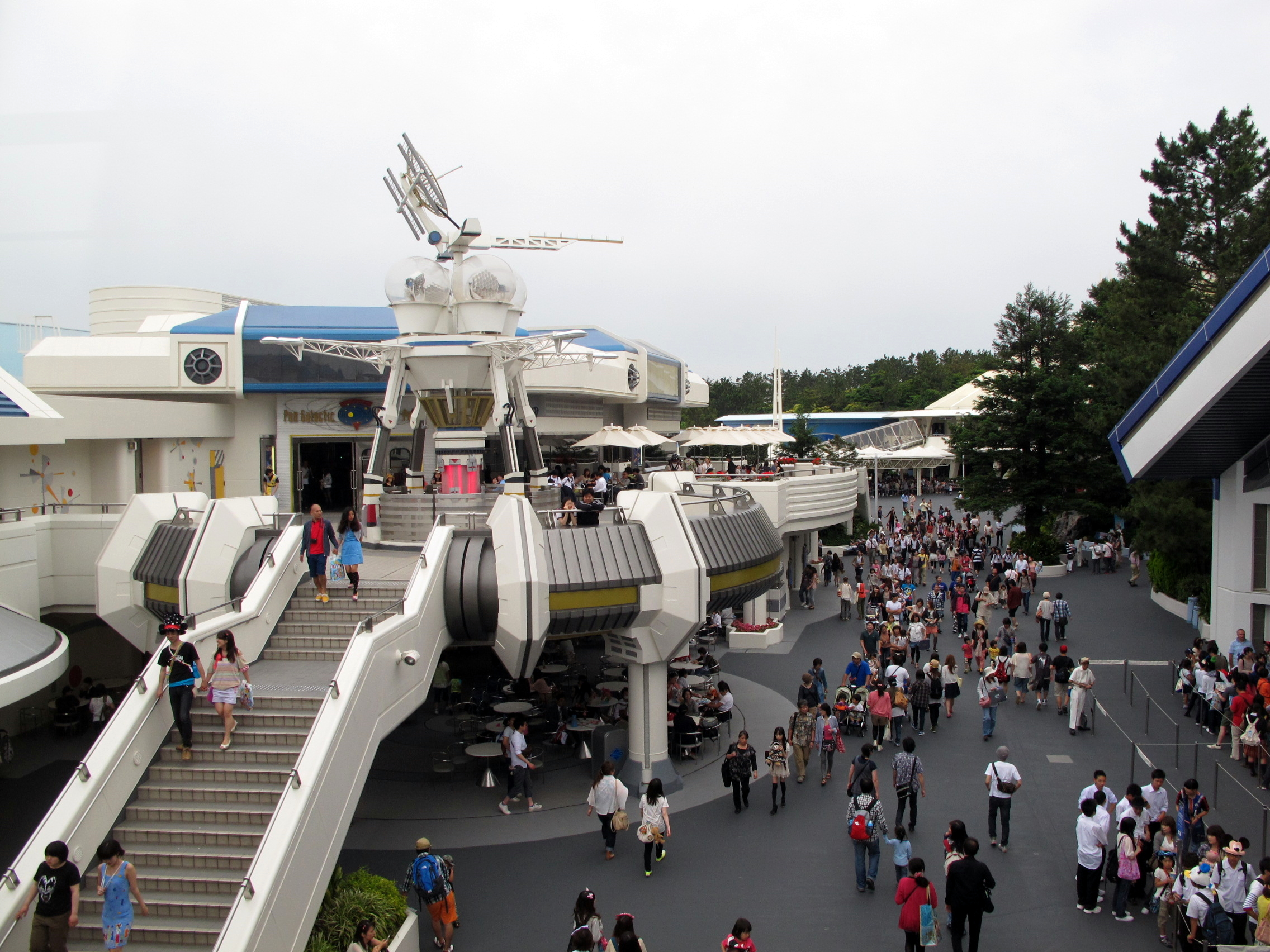
Tokyo Disneyland Tomorrowland

Tokyo Disneyland's Tomorrowland was designed as a loose copy of Disney World's original Tomorrowland, particularly the main entryway which features nearly identical waterfalls and blue spires flanking the walkway. As is the case with other areas of Tokyo Disneyland, Tomorrowland has fewer attractions and more open spaces than its American counterparts, a move designed to facilitate a larger number of park guests. Notably missing is a PeopleMover-type attraction, whose tracks and ride vehicles have been conspicuous features of other Tomorrowland landscapes.

Although Walt Disney originally intended Tomorrowland to be a "living blueprint" of the future, Tokyo Disneyland's Tomorrowland never directly showcased future technology, instead opting for a science fiction fantasy theme. Prominent attractions supporting this theme include Space Mountain as well as the Pan Galactic Pizza Port, a restaurant that features a large audio-animatronic pizza-making machine operated by a whimsical alien creature named Tony Solaroni. In recent years, older attractions have been replaced with newer ones that feature movie tie-ins: Buzz Lightyear's Astro Blasters and Monsters, Inc. Ride & Go Seek are two examples.

In October 2014 the Oriental Land Company announced a Beauty and the Beast-themed area to be located on the site of the now-closed Grand Circuit Raceway, making Tomorrowland's size significantly smaller. In April 2022, the Oriental Land Company announced that the third renovations of Space Mountain ride would be completely remodeled and feature a newly added Tomorrowland Square courtyard area with space themed gardens celebrating Earth's unique place in the universe, since the first two renovations of the ride was being temporarily closed. In April 2024, the Oriental Land Company announced that Buzz Lightyear's Astro Blasters would be closing and replaced with a Wreck-It Ralph attraction, which will be open in Spring 2027. On August 12, 2026, it was announced that the name of the two attractions and more details will be revealed and the surrounding area will be called Tomorrowland Plaza.

=== Attractions and entertainment ===
- Space Mountain: Earthrise (Reopening in 2027)
- Monsters, Inc. Ride & Go Seek (2009–present)
- Star Tours—The Adventures Continue (2013–present)
- Stitch Encounter (2015–present)
- Tony Solaroni Show
- The Happy Ride with Baymax (2020–present)
- Showbase (1988–present)
  - Club Mouse Beat (2021–present)

=== Upcoming attractions and entertainment ===
- Sugar Rush: Sweet Rescue (Opening on April 15, 2027)

=== Former attractions and entertainment ===
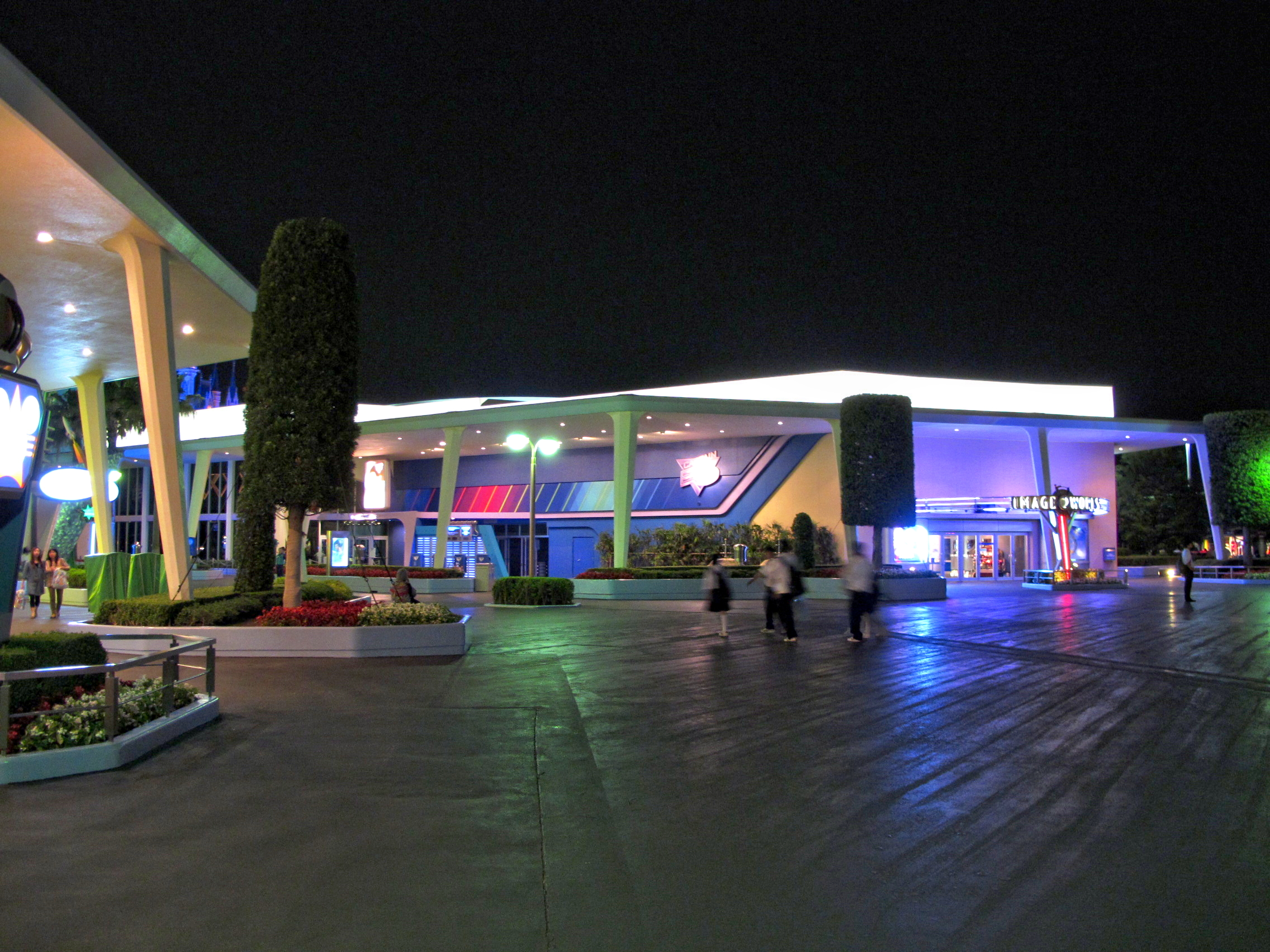
Captain EO

- Skyway to Fantasyland (1983–1998)
- Circle-Vision 360° (1983–2002)
  - Eternal Seas (1983–1984)
  - Magic Journeys (1985–1987)
  - The Timekeeper (1993–2002)
- Meet the World (1983–2002)
- Starcade (1983–2007)
- Space Mountain (1983–2006, 2007–2024)
- Magic Eye Theater
  - Captain EO (1987–1996, 2010–2014)
  - MicroAdventure! (1997–2010)
- Star Tours (1989–2012)
- Grand Circuit Raceway (1983–2017)
- Star Jets (1983–2017)
- Tomorrowland Terrace Stage (1983–present)
  - Roger Rabbit's Dancin' Time Warp (1992–1996)
  - Toy Story Fun Party (1996–1997)
  - Hot Wax Trucks (1997–1998)
  - Cosmic Carnival (1998–2000)
- Showbase (1988–present)
  - One Man's Dream (1988–1995)
  - Feel the Magic (1995–1999)
  - Once Upon a Mouse (1999–2004)
  - One Man's Dream II: The Magic Lives On (2004–2019)
- Robo Astro
- Opus Five
- Buzz Lightyear's Astro Blasters (2004–2024)

=== Restaurants and refreshments ===
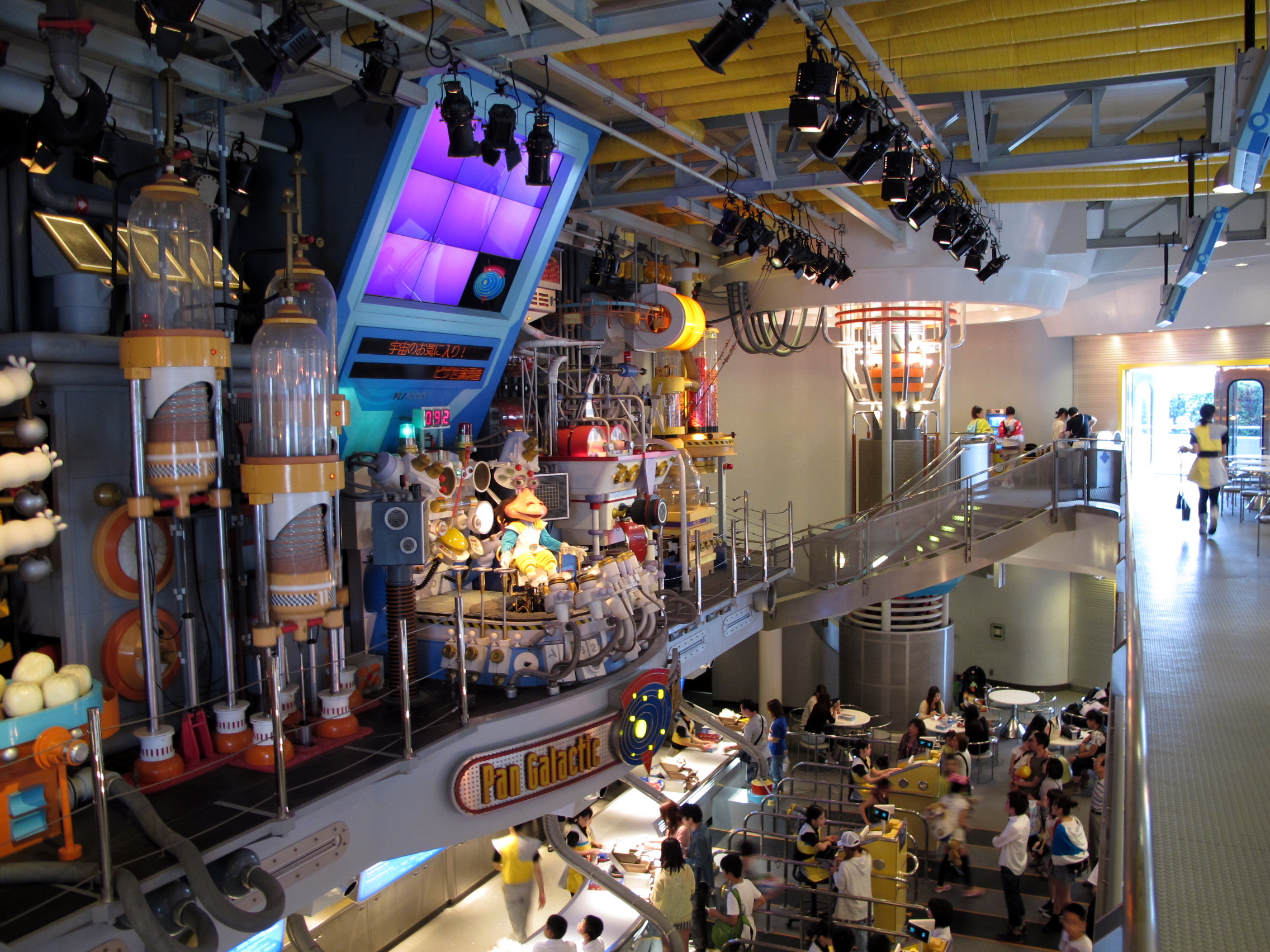
Pan Galactic Pizza Port

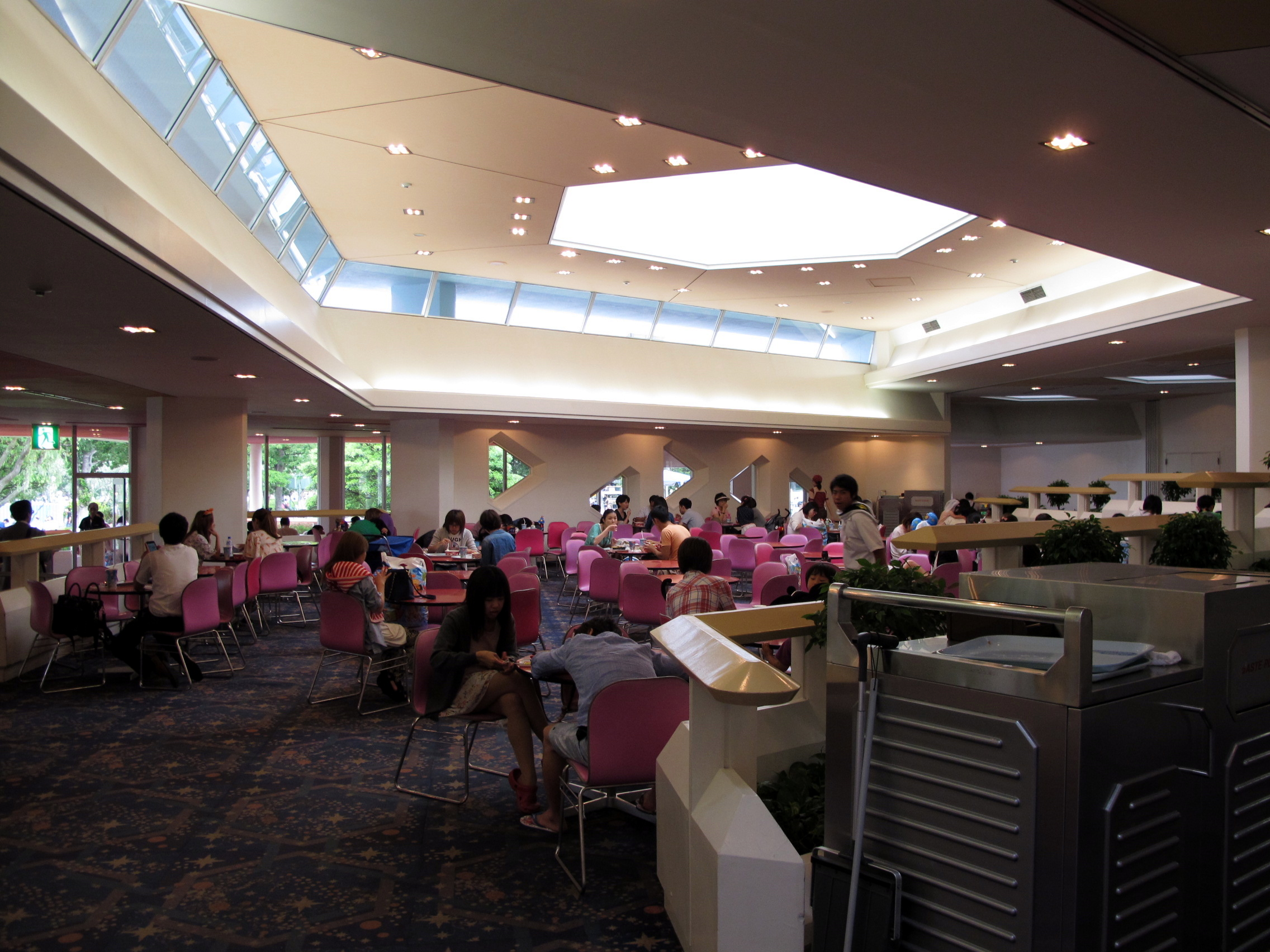
Plaza Restaurant

- Pan Galactic Pizza Port
- Plazma Ray's Diner
- Soft Landing
- Popping Station (Opening in Spring 2027)
- The Big Pop
- Tomorrowland Terrace

=== Former restaurants and refreshments ===
- Space Place FoodPort
- Lite Bite Satellite
- The Popping Pod

=== Shops ===
- Monsters, Inc. Company Store
- Cosmic Encounter
- Stargazer Supplies
- Treasure Comet

=== Former shops ===
- Solar Ray's Light Supplies
- Planet M

== Disneyland Park (Paris) ==
Discoveryland at Disneyland Paris

Disneyland Park in Paris has a Tomorrowland with an entirely different concept, Discoveryland. European culture was used distinctively in the park and Discoveryland uses the ideas of famed European thinkers and explorers such as Leonardo da Vinci or H. G. Wells, with Jules Verne featured most prominently. This land was heavily inspired by the abandoned Disneyland concept Discovery Bay, which would have sat at the north end of the park's Rivers of America. An example of an attraction is HyperSpace Mountain, an enclosed outer space themed roller coaster with a tongue, which is a 2 inversion element, a corkscrew and objects made to look like spaceships and asteroids.

Architecturally designed using Jules Verne's vision of the future as inspiration, the land is laid out very differently from its predecessors. Many Tomorrowland classics are featured in Discoveryland, such as Autopia and Orbitron, some in an altered way, but Space Mountain is changed the most. Its theme is Steampunk/Clockpunk, with elements of Raygun Gothic.

=== History ===
Originally conceived as Discovery Mountain, it was originally proposed to hold more than one attraction, including an improved version of Horizons from Epcot, a larger Nautilus walk-through complete with a restaurant and a free-fall ride based on Journey to the Center of the Earth. But due to budget cuts, it opened in 1995 as Space Mountain: De la Terre à la Lune (From the Earth to the Moon). Beside the Space Mountain show building is the Nautilus Lagoon, with a walk-through recreation of the Nautilus submarine from 20,000 Leagues Under the Sea.

The showcase attraction on opening day was a Circle-Vision 360 film, titled Le Visionarium. The attraction featured an eccentric time-traveling robot and his robotic assistant, who take Jules Verne into the world of today, which is pictured as the future he dreamed of. The attraction was later exported to both the Magic Kingdom and to Tokyo Disneyland.

Space Mountain was completely refurbished in 2005 for the Happiest Celebration on Earth, with a new soundtrack and special effects. Buzz Lightyear Laser Blast opened April 8, 2006, in the former building of Le Visionarium, which closed in September 2004.

=== Attractions and entertainment ===
- Buzz Lightyear Laser Blast (2006–present)
- Orbitron – Machines Volantes (1992–present)
- Autopia (1992–present)
- Les Mystères du Nautilus (1994–present)
- Disneyland Railroad – Discoveryland Station (1992–present)
- Discoveryland Theatre
  - Mickey et son Orchestre PhilharMagique – Mickey's PhilharMagic (2018–present)
- Star Tours: L'Aventure Continue – Star Tours: The Adventures Continue (2017–present)
- Hyperspace Mountain (2017–present)
- Starport

=== Former attractions and entertainment ===
- Circle-Vision 360°:
  - Le Visionarium (1992–2004)
- Space Mountain: From Earth to the Moon (1995–2005)
- Discoveryland Theatre:
  - Honey, I Shrunk the Audience (1999–2010)
  - Captain EO (1992–1998; 2010–2015)
- Star Tours (1992–2016)
- Space Mountain Mission 2 (2005–2017)
- Le Café des Visionnaires
- Arcade Beta and Omega

=== Restaurants and refreshments ===
- Café Hyperion
- Cool Station
- Rocket Café

=== Former restaurants and refreshments ===
- Buzz Lightyear's Pizza Planet Restaurant

=== Shops ===
- Constellations
- Star Command Photographs
- Light Speed Photography
- Star Traders

== Hong Kong Disneyland ==
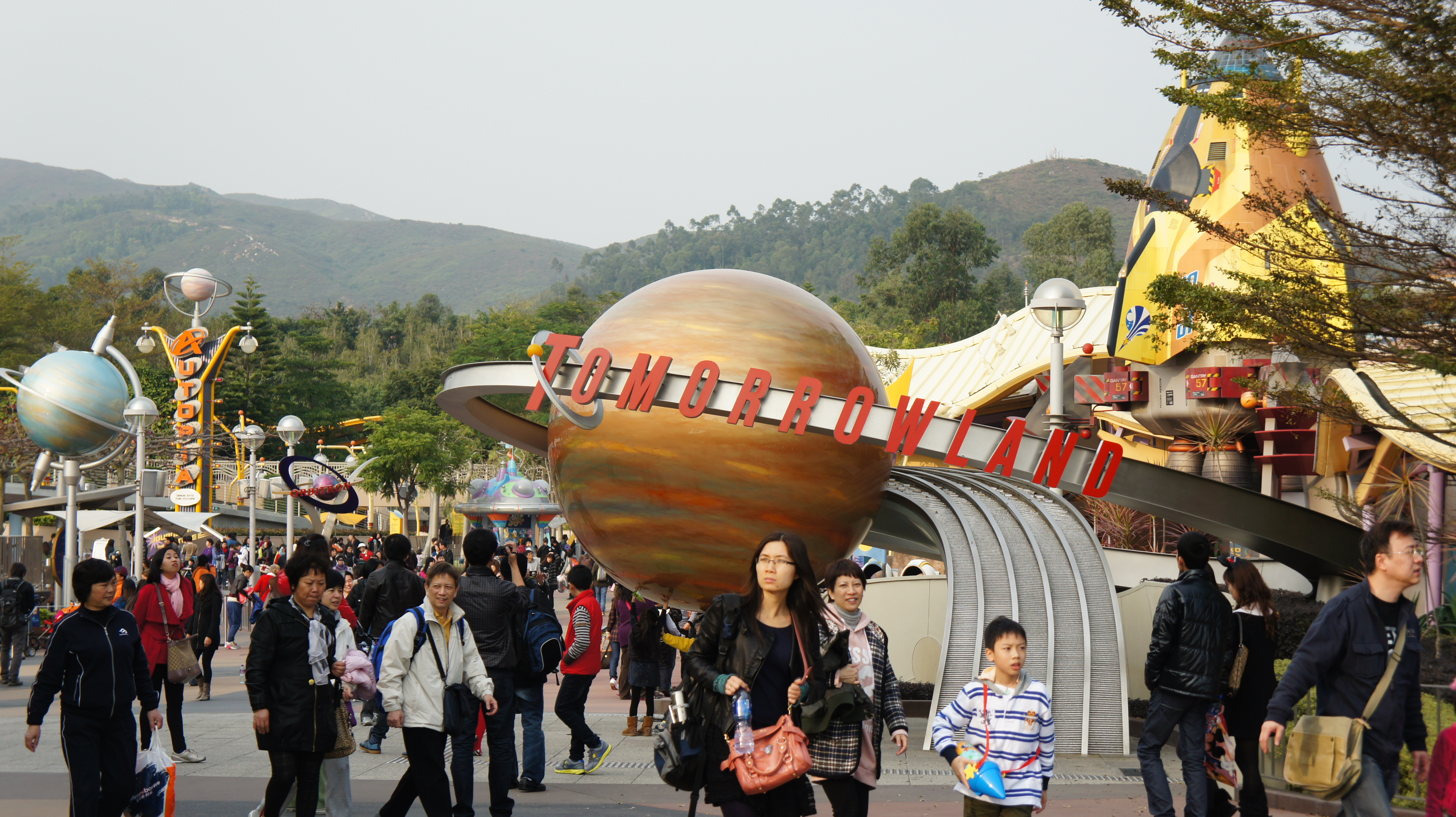
Tomorrowland entrance in Hong Kong Disneyland (2012)

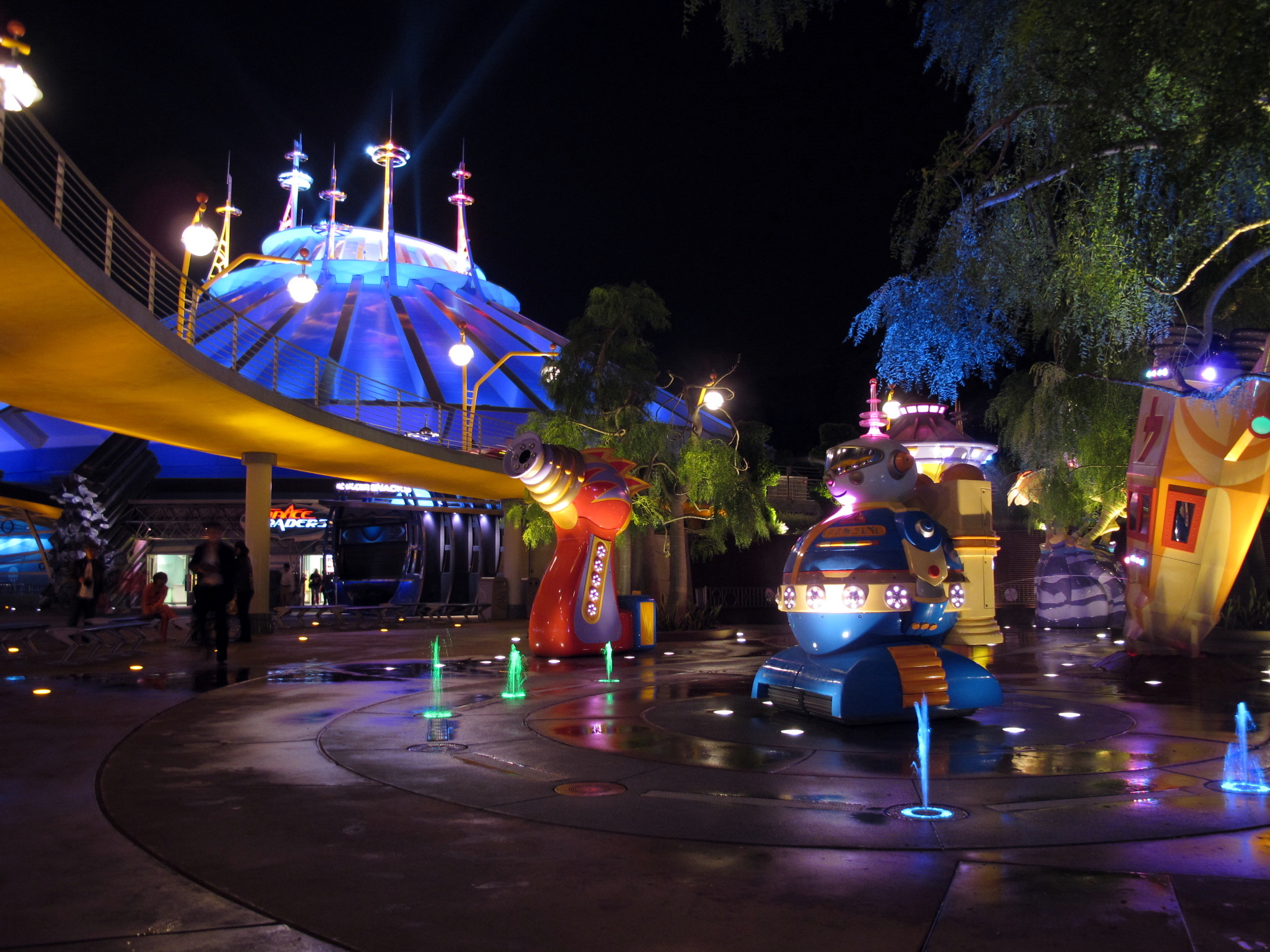
UFO Zone in Hong Kong Disneyland (2012)

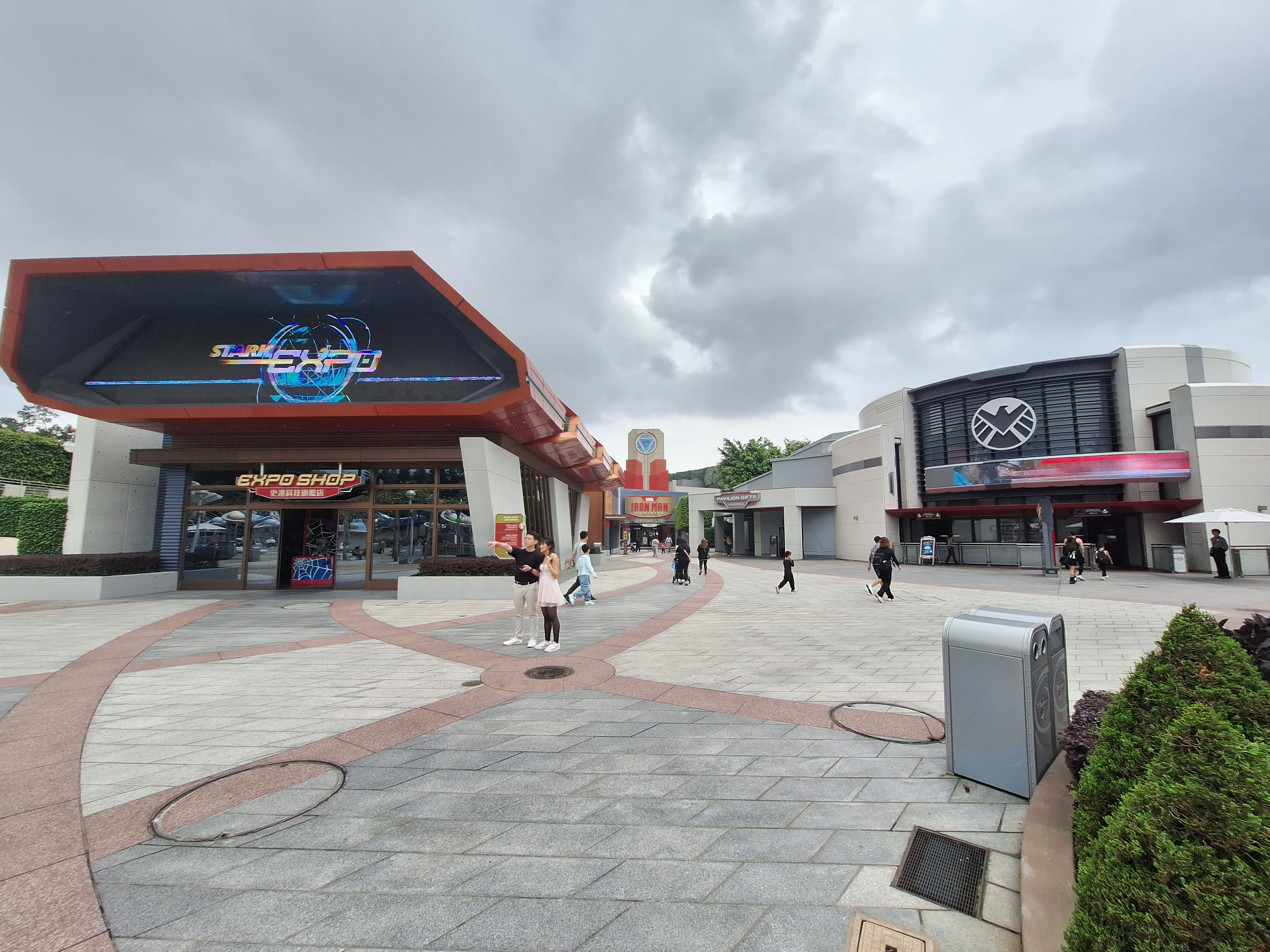
Hong Kong Stark Expo Venue (Iron Man Experience) and S.H.I.E.L.D. Science and Technology Pavilion (Ant-Man and The Wasp: Nano Battle!) in Hong Kong Disneyland (2024)

Like the newer generations of the American Tomorrowlands, Hong Kong's version features an emphasis on metallic trim, with many blue and purple hues. In August 2014, UFO Zone was suspended in preparation for "Tomorrowland Party Zone", a stage as part of "Disney's Haunted Halloween".

As part of "Star Wars: Tomorrowland Takeover" event since June 2016, the first three expansion attractions were all closed. On April 5, UFO Zone has been closed in preparation for Jedi Training: Trials of the Temple that premiered on June 25. On May 2, Stitch Encounter was closed and re-themed to "Star Wars: Command Post". On June 11, when the event started, Autopia was closed.

Starting in 2017, with the opening of Stark Expo and the Iron Man Experience, the first Disney attraction to be based on a Marvel property, part of Tomorrowland will transform in phases to become Stark Expo, as part of Hong Kong Disneyland's huge expansion plan (2017–2026). The second phase will see the opening of Ant-Man and the Wasp: Nano Battle! in March 2019, taking over the former Buzz Lightyear Astro Blasters building which will be transformed into the S.H.I.E.L.D. Science and Technology Pavilion. The third and last phase will be unveiled in 2026 with the completion of the Marvel area and the opening of the planned E-Ticket Avengers Quinjet, taking over the spot of the former Autopia circuit. On January 4, 2026, it was announced that Tomorrowland Stage in the portion of Tomorrowland was being permanently closed to make way for a new Avengers ride and became part of the section of Stark Expo. However, it is revealed that Star Expo are now set to became part of Tomorrowland, and more details were released in August 2026 at D23: The Ultimate Disney Fan Event 2026, which revealed that the attraction will feature a story about Avengers pavilion, which will soon be the home to the Avengers Research Testing Labs in Stark Expo.

=== Attractions and entertainment ===
- Orbitron (2005–present)
- Hyperspace Mountain (2016–present)
- Stark Expo
  - Ant-Man and The Wasp: Nano Battle! (2019–present)
  - Iron Man Experience (2017–present)
    - Iron Man Tech Showcase – Presented by Stark Industries

=== Upcoming attractions and entertainment ===
- Stark Expo
  - Unnamed Avengers attraction

=== Former attractions and entertainment ===
- Space Mountain (2005–2016)
  - Space Mountain: Ghost Galaxy (Halloween seasonal; 2007–2013)
- Muppet Mobile Lab (2008–2013)
- Autopia (2006–2016)
- Stitch Encounter (2006–2016)
- UFO Zone (2006–2016)
- Buzz Lightyear Astro Blasters (2005–2017)
- Tomorrowland Stage
  - Jedi Training: Trials of the Temple (2016–2021)
  - Calling All Heroes: Avengers and Heroes of Tomorrow Assemble! (2023)
- Star Wars: Command Post (2016–2021)

=== Restaurants and refreshments ===
- NRG POD
- Starliner Diner

=== Former restaurants and refreshments ===
- BB-8 Snack Cart
- Flying Saucer Snacks
- Comet Café

=== Shops ===
- Expo Shop
- Space Traders
- Pavilion Gifts

=== Former shops ===
- Star Command Suppliers (2005–2017)

== Shanghai Disneyland ==
=== History ===
Shanghai Disneyland's Tomorrowland is the newest, opening with the resort on June 16, 2016. Unlike the other 5 Tomorrowlands around the world, this one is on the left side of the park instead of being on the right side. Also this Tomorrowland does not feature Space Mountain, and instead features the TRON Lightcycle Power Run. Instead of a classic spinning rockets attraction, Shanghai's park includes a spinning Jet Packs ride. There is a new version of Disney's popular Buzz Lightyear dark ride called Buzz Lightyear Planet Rescue, utilizing new technology different from that of the versions of the ride located at other Disney parks. TRON Realm opened on September 20, 2016 to make it the first expansion for the park.

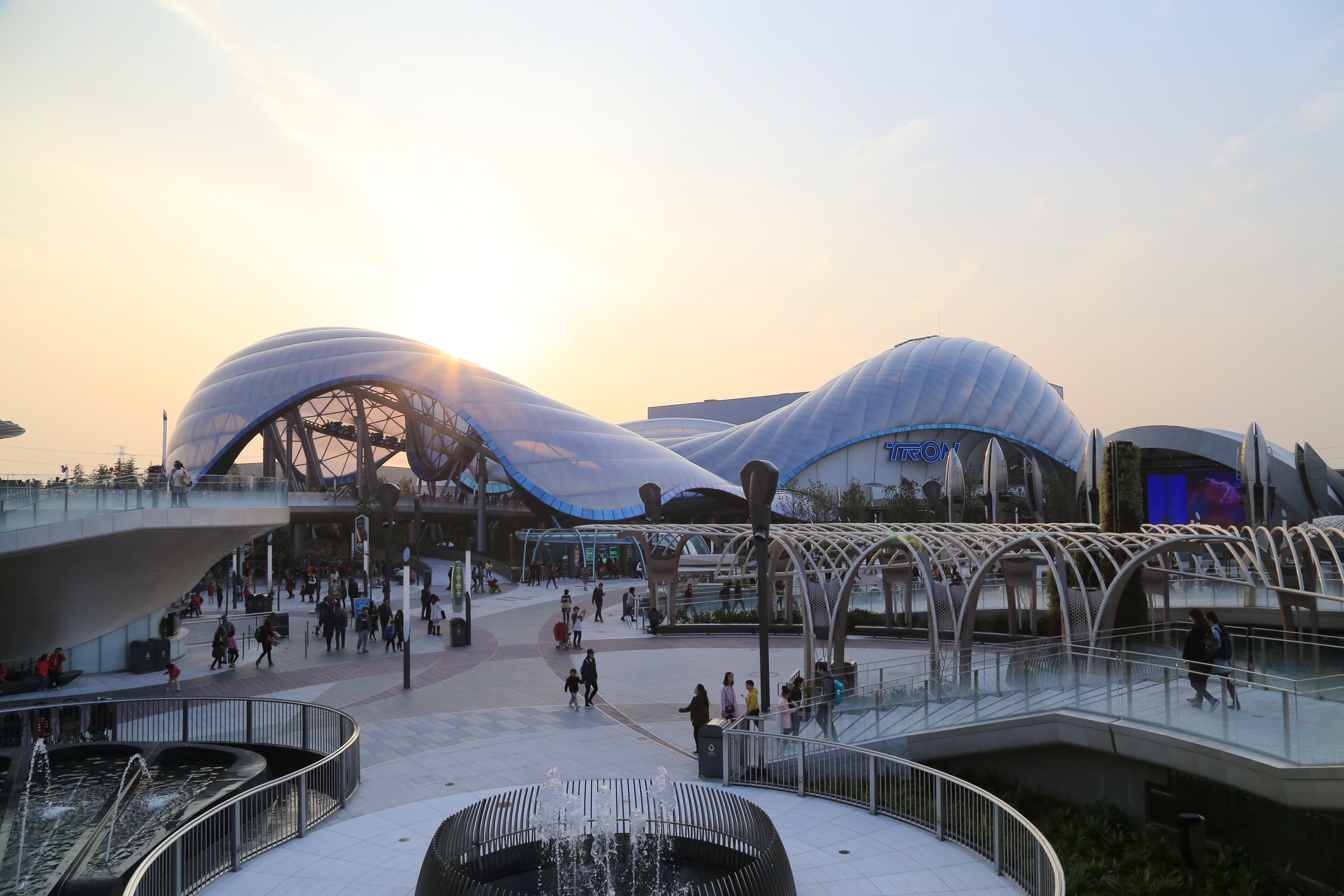
Tomorrowland at Shanghai Disneyland

=== Attractions and entertainment ===
- Avengers Training Initiative
- Buzz Lightyear Planet Rescue (2016–present)
- Jet Packs (2016–present)
- Stitch Space Base
  - Space Chat With Stitch (2025–present)
- TRON Lightcycle Power Run (2016–present)
- TRON Realm
- Tomorrowland Pavilion
  - Pixar Adventurous Journey

=== Former attractions and entertainment ===
- Tomorrowland Pavilion
  - Star Wars Launch Bay (2016–2019)
  - Avatar: Explore Pandora (2022–2023)
- Stitch Encounter (2016–2025)

=== Restaurants and refreshments ===
- Stitch Space Base
  - Star Trail Snacks
- Stargazer Grill

=== Former Restaurants and refreshments ===
- Spiral Snacks

=== Shops ===
- Intergalactic Imports
- The Light Stuff
- Tomorrowland Pavilion Shop
- Power Supplies

=== Former shops ===
- Imperial Trading Station

== In popular culture ==
=== Television ===
- Couple of Episodes from the Anthology series were focused on the Tomorrowland.
- In the 2007 television series Mad Men, the fourth season's "Tomorrowland" episode is partially set at Disneyland, and at one point, Don Draper and Megan Calvet plot out the Disneyland attractions they will take Draper's children to visit, including Mr. Toad's Wild Ride.
- Tomorrowland (with the attractions Mission to Mars, Space Mountain, and Astro Orbitor) was featured in the Mickey Mouse episodes, "Space Walkies" and "Wish Upon a Coin".
- The 2015 television series Miles from Tomorrowland is based on Tomorrowland, focused on a family working for the Tomorrowland Transit Authority from the Magic Kingdom's Peoplemover.

=== Film ===
- In Meet the Robinsons, 2 classic, current and former attractions are featured in the area of the park called Todayland: Rocket Jets and Space Mountain.
- The 2015 film Tomorrowland by director Brad Bird, screenwriter Damon Lindelof and starring George Clooney, features a place in another dimension called Tomorrowland that is patterned after the theme park as an eponymous location and plot point.

=== Video games ===
- In the 2010 video game Epic Mickey, an area named Tomorrow City is inspired by Tomorrowland.
- In the 2015 video game Disney Infinity 3.0, a power disc pack is based on Tomorrowland.
