= Rocket Jets =

Former attraction at Disneyland

- Attraction poster

Disneyland
- Area: Tomorrowland
- Coordinates: 33°48′43.63″N 117°55′1.93″W
- Status: Removed
- Opening date: July 2, 1967
- Closing date: January 6, 1997
- Replaced: Astro Jets
- Replaced by: Astro Orbiter

Ride statistics
- Attraction type: Aerial carousel
- Designer: WED Enterprises
- Theme: Rockets
- Vehicle type: Saturn V rocket
- Riders per vehicle: 2

Rocket Jets was an attraction in Disneyland at the Disneyland Resort in Anaheim, California. This attraction opened in 1967 with the new Tomorrowland and closed in 1997 for the New Tomorrowland update in 1998. It was the third spinning rocket attraction in Tomorrowland and stood three stories above the ground. When Tomorrowland was redone for 1998, the Rocket Jets were replaced by a new attraction based on Orbitron at the entrance to Discoveryland in Disneyland Park (Paris).

== Observatron ==
The Rocket Jets remained in their place above the former PeopleMover station as the Observatron, a sculpture that was intended to spin and play music every fifteen minutes. There are only two tracks, from Space Mountain: De la Terre à la Lune (Space Mountain: From the Earth to the Moon) and Le Visionarium (The Timekeeper), both of which are defunct Disneyland Paris attractions (De la Terre à la Lune is now Space Mountain: Mission 2, while The Timekeeper was also an attraction at the Magic Kingdom in Florida). The rockets were replaced by satellite dishes and the Saturn V rocket in the center was replaced by a laser-beam. However, the Observatron often malfunctioned, as the machinery was built to operate more frequently and to carry the rockets, rather than the satellite dishes they were replaced with. It appeared to have mechanical issues, sometimes only playing music every 15 minutes, or not doing anything at all.

In late 2006, the Observatron received much needed maintenance which allows the Observatron to now rotate every 15 minutes while playing its music as originally planned. As part of the maintenance, the old speakers were replaced with new ones and new speakers were added. Since this maintenance, the Observatron rarely breaks down and operates on a daily basis as intended.

The Saturn V rocket that the rockets were attached to was sold on eBay by Disney Auction in 2005. One remains on display, along with Skyway gondolas, in "Little Green Men Store Command" with a space ranger design. During Disneyland's 50th anniversary, one of the satellite dishes was replaced by a 50 Mickey Mouse head.

== In popular culture ==
The Rocket Jets appear in a scene from the Disney animated film Meet the Robinsons alongside another Disneyland attraction, Space Mountain. The area they are shown in is known as "Todayland".

The poster of the attraction appears as an easter egg in Monsters, Inc. on the kid bedroom during the scene when Mike Wazowski tries to make the kid laugh.

== See also ==
- Astro Orbiter
