= Flying Jumbos =

Red Baron ride in London, England

Elmer's Flying Jumbos

Chessington World of Adventures Resort
- Area: Adventure Point
- Status: Operating
- Opening date: 1987

Ride statistics
- Attraction type: Red Baron
- Manufacturer: Preston & Barbieri
- Theme: Elephants
- Capacity: 240 riders per hour
- Vehicles: 12
- Riders per vehicle: 1-2
- Duration: 1:30-3:00
- Reserve and Ride available
- Wheelchair accessible

Elmer's Flying Jumbos is a Red Baron ride operating at Chessington World of Adventures Resort in London. Originally in the area of Toytown, it later moved to the Zufari area and then finally Adventure Point. In the spring of 2020, it was renamed Elmer's Flying Jumbos. As of May 2023, the Chessington ride continues to operate after a long 36 years.

== History ==
Flying Jumbos is a Mini Jet Red Baron from 1987. Manufactured by Preston & Barbieri, it is an aerial carousel spinning ride with elephant-themed cabs, originally pink and now grey.

Africa was Chessington's new area for 2012, after the former area, Toytown, was replaced with a new land in line with Chessington's image as being Britain's Wildest Adventure. Many of the gentle, children's rides such as Flying Jumbos were moved to other areas, leaving only three rides in the area. In 2013 Flying Jumbos opened in the Zufari area. In January 2020, it was announced that a new four-year partnership was created with Chessington World Of Adventures, with the theme of Elmer, a fictional family book character, entering the park and retheming the ride to Elmer's Flying Jumbos.

== Description ==
Riders sit inside fibreglass elephants which rotate like a merry-go-round. Holding down a button makes the elephants fly, or lowers it. Anyone under 1.1 meters must be accompanied by an adult, with a maximum torso measurement of 51 inches.

== Gallery ==
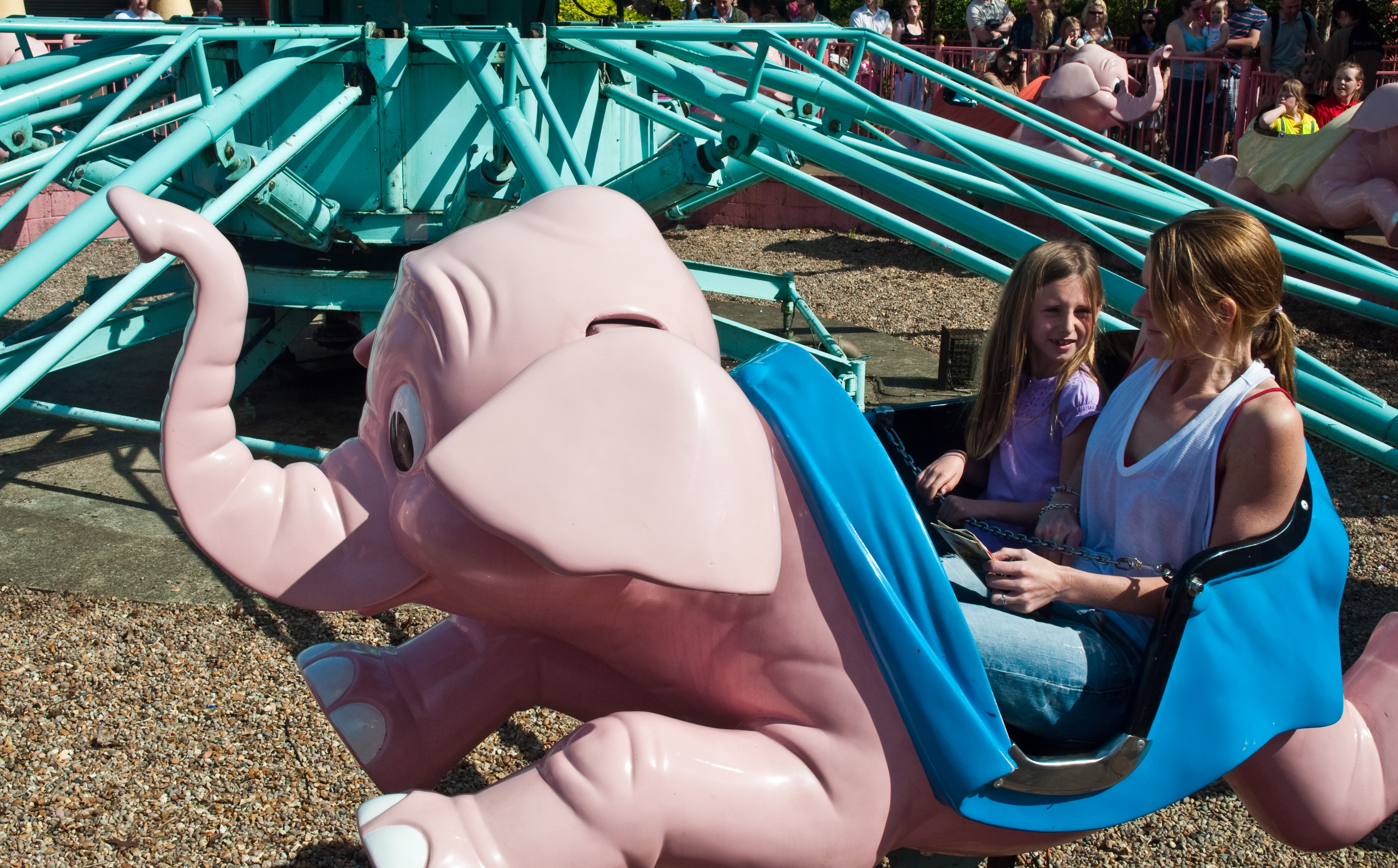
The ride's pink theming in 2011

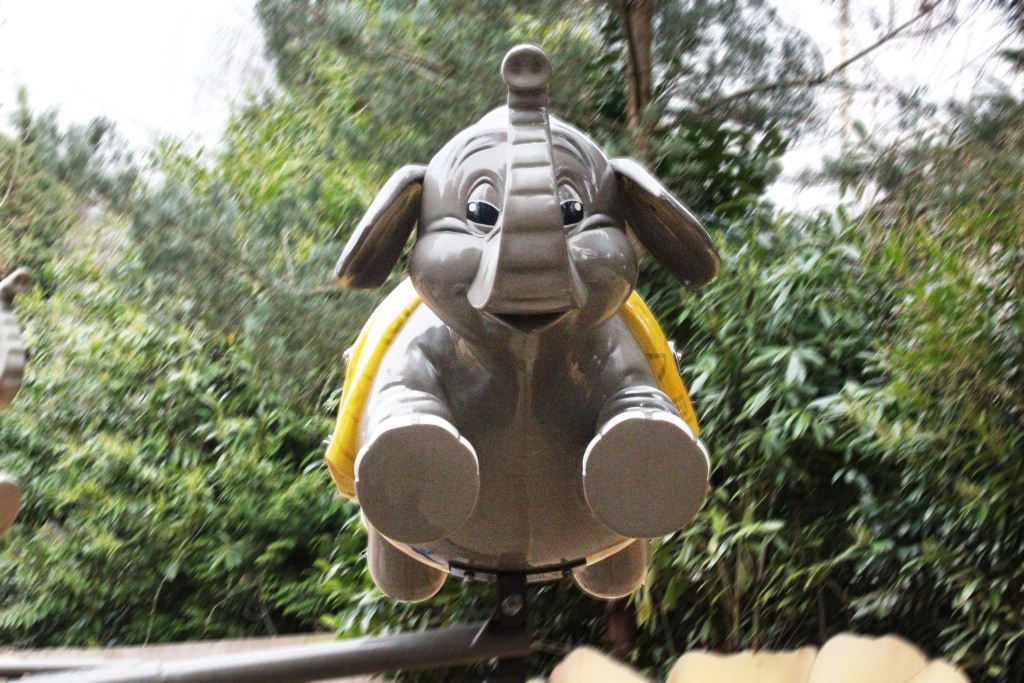
Grey theming from 2013

== Similar rides ==
There are similar rides named Flying Jumbos at:

- Drayton Manor Theme Park (1998–2007)
- Adventure Island
- M&D's

== See also ==
- Chessington World of Adventures Resort
