= Mission to Mars (attraction) =

Amusement ride at Disneyland and Magic Kingdom

Coordinates: 28°25′07″N 81°34′47″W

Disneyland
- Area: Tomorrowland
- Status: Removed
- Opening date: July 22, 1955 (as Rocket to the Moon); July 2, 1967 (as Flight to the Moon); March 21, 1975 (as Mission to Mars)
- Closing date: November 2, 1992
- Replaced: Flight to the Moon
- Replaced by: Redd Rockett's Pizza Port

Magic Kingdom
- Area: Tomorrowland
- Status: Removed
- Opening date: December 24, 1971 (as Flight to the Moon); June 7, 1975 (as Mission to Mars)
- Closing date: October 4, 1993
- Replaced: Flight to the Moon
- Replaced by: Extraterrorestrial Alien Encounter

Ride statistics
- Attraction type: Show

Mission to Mars was an attraction located in Tomorrowland at Disneyland and at Walt Disney World's Magic Kingdom. It originally opened as Rocket to the Moon at Disneyland in 1955, and as Flight to the Moon in Walt Disney World on Christmas Eve 1971, before it was retooled to the Mars version in 1975. It then closed down in 1992 and 1993, respectively. The attraction simulated taking guests on a space trip to the Moon or Mars.

The attraction was adapted by Disney into a feature film in 2000.

== History ==
The outside of the attraction in 1963, when it was still named Rocket to the Moon

The show was originally named Rocket to the Moon, and it opened in 1955 along with Disneyland. The ride was refurbished as Flight to the Moon in 1967. On March 21, 1975, the destination was changed to Mars because humans had already been to the Moon.

The technology of Rocket to the Moon was reminiscent of the Hale’s Tours of the World amusement park rides, made to simulate travel by train. Walt Disney encountered this attraction as a child at Electric Park, Kansas City.

The show was initially sponsored by McDonnell-Douglas. After sponsorship ended, logos referring to the company were removed from the attraction, but the outline of the stylized tail fin in the McDonnell-Douglas logo still remained part of the building's façade as Alien Pizza Planet. After the show closed in 1992, McDonnell-Douglas merged with Boeing in August 1997 in a US $13 billion stock swap, with Boeing as the surviving company.

== Show ==
The show was designed in cooperation with NASA and was basically a revised and updated version of the previous attraction Flight to the Moon. Guests would now be launched on a spacecraft into space and then approach the surface of the red planet Mars.

Guests would first enter a viewing area known as Mission Control, which was modeled after a typical mission control center with chairs and control panels for about ten seated Audio-Animatronic "technicians" whose backs were to the audience as they moved their heads and arms. Facing the audience was the Audio-Animatronic flight director Mr. Johnson. He would then talk and show film clips to explain how humans had made numerous advances in space travel and manufacturing in microgravity, and also learned how to deal with the effects of space. The lecture was interrupted once per show by an intruder alarm caused by a large bird crash-landing near the spacecraft launch pad. The voice of Mr. Johnson was provided by George Walsh, who also was the narrator on the television show Gunsmoke as well as other Disney specials like Pacifically Peeking, an episode of Walt Disney's Wonderful World of Color and The Magic of Disneyland special.

After the pre-show, guests would move on and finally board their spacecraft. Inside was a circular theater with stadium-like seating with circular flat screens on the ceiling and floor. During the mission, guests could look at the views from outside the spacecraft from either of these screens. There were also side screens that showed film clips or graphics. "Third Officer Collins", voiced by Peter Renaday, was the tour guide, and discussed the mission as the spacecraft explored space and Mars. Eventually, the ship was damaged, possibly by a volcanic eruption, and the ship had to quickly head back to Earth. The seats in the attraction would simulate the vibrations and G-forces from "Hyper-space" during take-offs and landings by filling up with compressed air. Finally, the spacecraft landed safely back on Earth and Officer Collins would then urge guests to return and visit again. As he explained, "there's a lot more to see on Mars".

== Disneyland ==
The attraction closed at Disneyland on November 2, 1992, having first been removed from most visitor documentation by 1991. One reason behind the closure was that the controversial attraction ExtraTERRORestrial Alien Encounter was to open in the building as part of CEO Michael Eisner's ambitious "Disney Decade". Along with Alien Encounter, The Timekeeper and "Plectu's Fantastic Galactic Revue" would have opened in the radical and richly detailed "Tomorrowland 2055" concept.

However, the "Tomorrowland 2055" project was cancelled in early 1993 when Disneyland Paris became a financial failure. Michael Eisner started cutting costs around the company, and was not happy with the estimated cost of the Tomorrowland project, though he had liked the idea. Start of construction on Disneyland's New Tomorrowland was changed from Fall 1994 to Spring 1997, but Alien Encounter, The Timekeeper, and Plectu's Fantastic Galactic Revue never opened. In 1996, Mission to Mars was temporarily replaced with Toy Story Funhouse. The building remained unused until it officially reopened as a restaurant, Redd Rockett's Pizza Port in Disneyland's New Tomorrowland on May 22, 1998.

== Walt Disney World ==
Mission to Mars closed its doors at the Magic Kingdom in Walt Disney World, Florida on October 4, 1993. It re-opened on June 20, 1995 as ExtraTERRORestrial Alien Encounter as part of the Magic Kingdom's New Tomorrowland, along with The Timekeeper. Alien Encounter closed in 2003 and was replaced by Stitch's Great Escape!, which operated from 2004 to 2018 and re-tooled many of the elements from ExtraTERRORestrial Alien Encounter in a more light and comical context. The space in the building in which all such attractions operated is currently unused for any attraction.

A ride with a similar theme, Mission: Space, opened in 2003 at Epcot.

== See also ==
- List of former Disneyland attractions
- Magic Kingdom attraction and entertainment history
