= The Happy Ride with Baymax =

Whip ride at Tokyo Disneyland

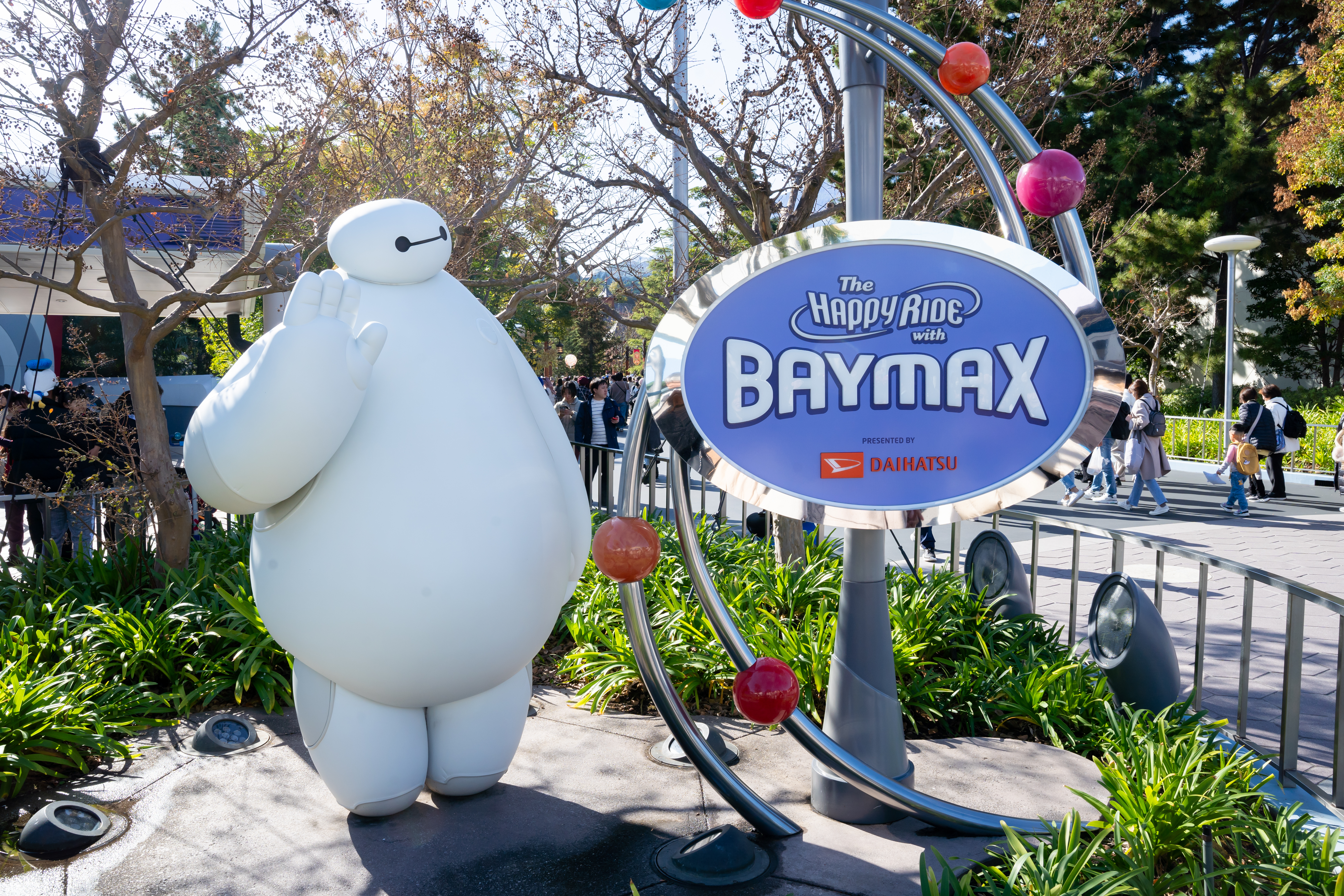

Tokyo Disneyland
- Area: Tomorrowland
- Status: Operating
- Soft opening date: September 21, 2020
- Opening date: September 28, 2020
- Replaced: Star Jets

Ride statistics
- Attraction type: Spinning
- Manufacturer: Zamperla
- Theme: Big Hero 6
- Disney Premier Access Available

The Happy Ride with Baymax is a whip ride at Tokyo Disneyland themed to Disney Animation's 2014 film Big Hero 6. The ride system is a heavily modified 3-table Zamperla Demolition Derby ride with custom ride vehicles provided by Walt Disney Imagineering. The ride vehicles feature Baymax, the rider's "personal healthcare companion", in a non-rideable spaceship connected by a swinging hitch to a rocketship-like bench with a swinging wheel on the bottom that allows the benches to "drift" along the corners in a fashion similar to a whip ride. The ride was originally scheduled to open on April 15, 2020, but the opening date was delayed due to the COVID-19 pandemic. The attraction eventually opened on September 28, 2020.

The backstory of the ride outlines that Hiro Hamada, the fourteen-year-old robotics prodigy from Big Hero 6, learns from Baymax, his robotic personal healthcare companion, that the first step to making people healthy is to make them happy. As such, Hiro and Baymax created a lively, musical ride designed to bring joy to everyone who experiences it. Guests are invited to join their own personal healthcare companion, "Baymax", and have their happiness levels measured with lights throughout the ride. The ride features an original soundtrack with six songs. Similar attractions include Alien Swirling Saucers at Disney's Hollywood Studios and Mater's Junkyard Jamboree at Disney California Adventure.

== Ride experience ==
Each time the ride operates, one of six original songs, specifically written for the attraction, is played. Along with the music, the lighting effects change according to the song being played. The ride's cast members typically engage in semi-choreographed dances to the music. As reported by Nippon TV, these dances by the cast members have gone viral on social media. They are often imitated by park guests, sometimes resulting in large numbers of guests dancing in the ride's queue or around the attraction whenever a song plays.

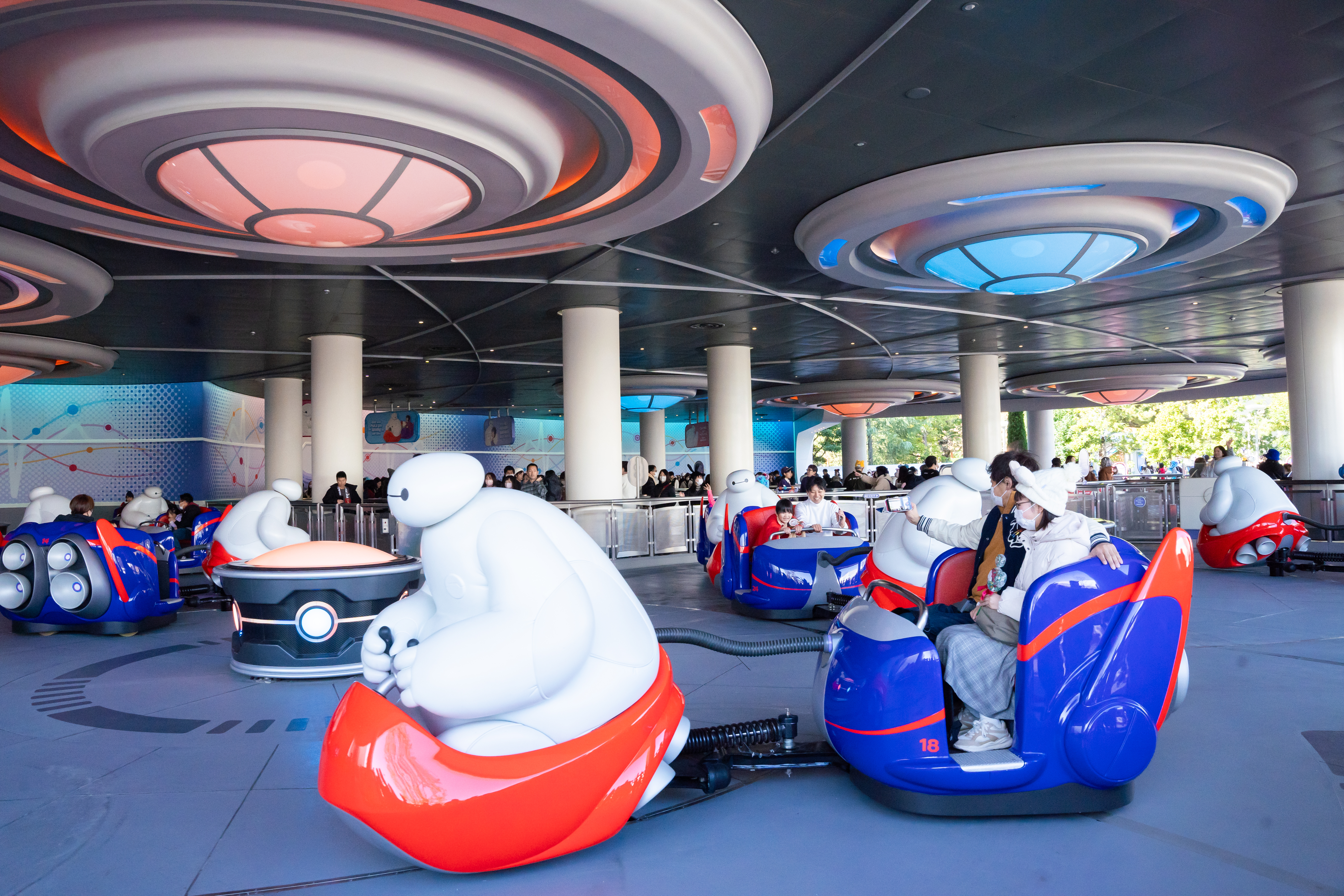
Ride vehicles featuring Baymax the guests "personal healthcare companion"

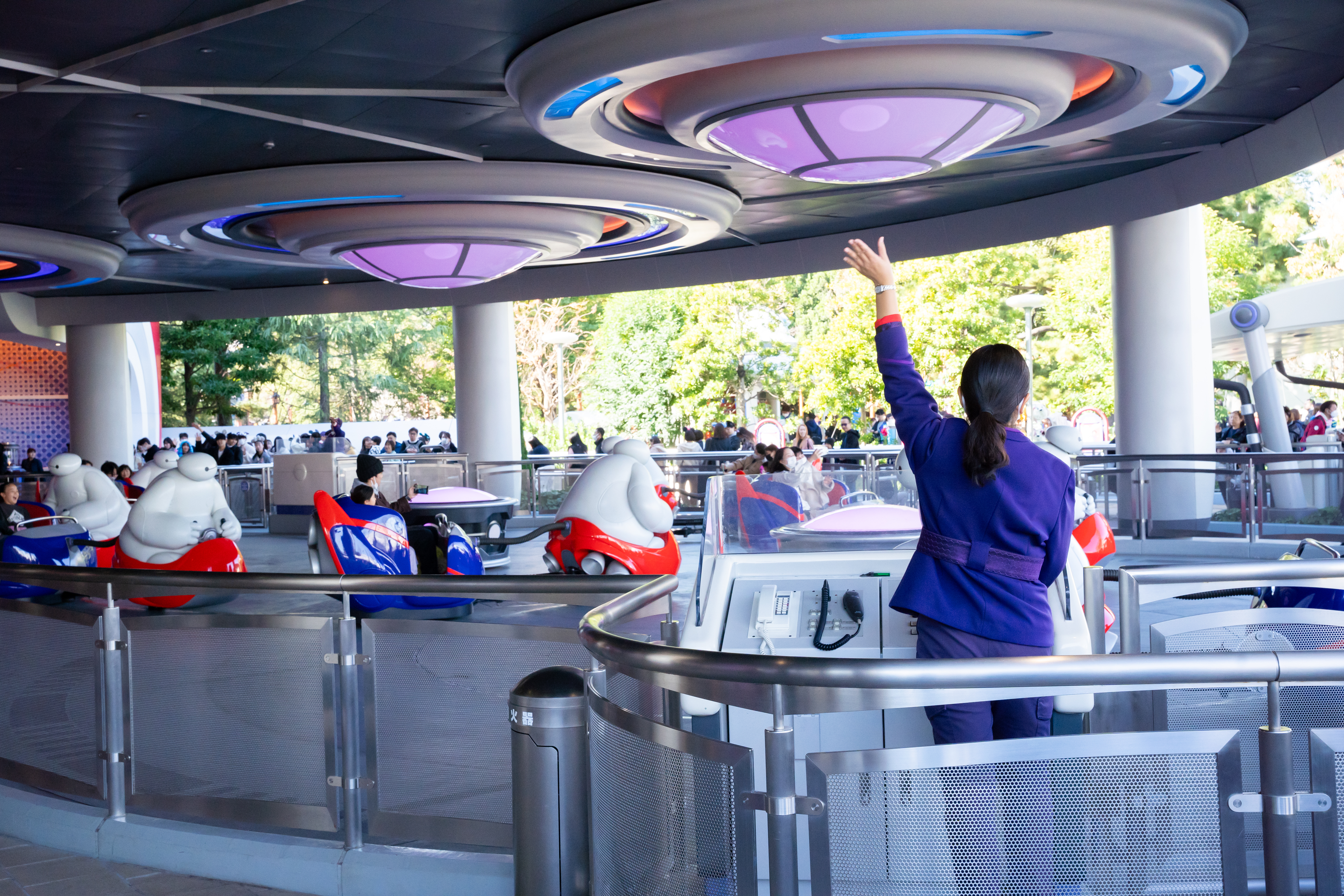
Cast members often dance to the rides music with semi-choreographed dances

== Soundtrack ==
The Happy Ride with Baymax

Soundtrack album by Tokyo Disneyland
- Released: November 27, 2020
- Length: 28:15
- Label: Walt Disney

The soundtrack album The Happy Ride with Baymax was released on November 27, 2020 by Walt Disney Records. The album features three versions of each track—the regular version, without dialogue version and an instrumental version.

=== Track listing ===
1. "B-A-Y-M-A-X"
2. "A New Angle"
3. "Happy Song"
4. "Ba La La La La La La La La"
5. "Koo Loo Lee"
6. "One Sweet Ride"

== See also ==
- Avengers Campus
- Marvel Super Hero Island
- Guardians of the Galaxy: Cosmic Rewind
- The Amazing Adventures of Spider-Man
- The Incredible Hulk Coaster
- Disney Hotel New York – The Art of Marvel
