= Astro Orbiter =

Attraction at Disney theme parks

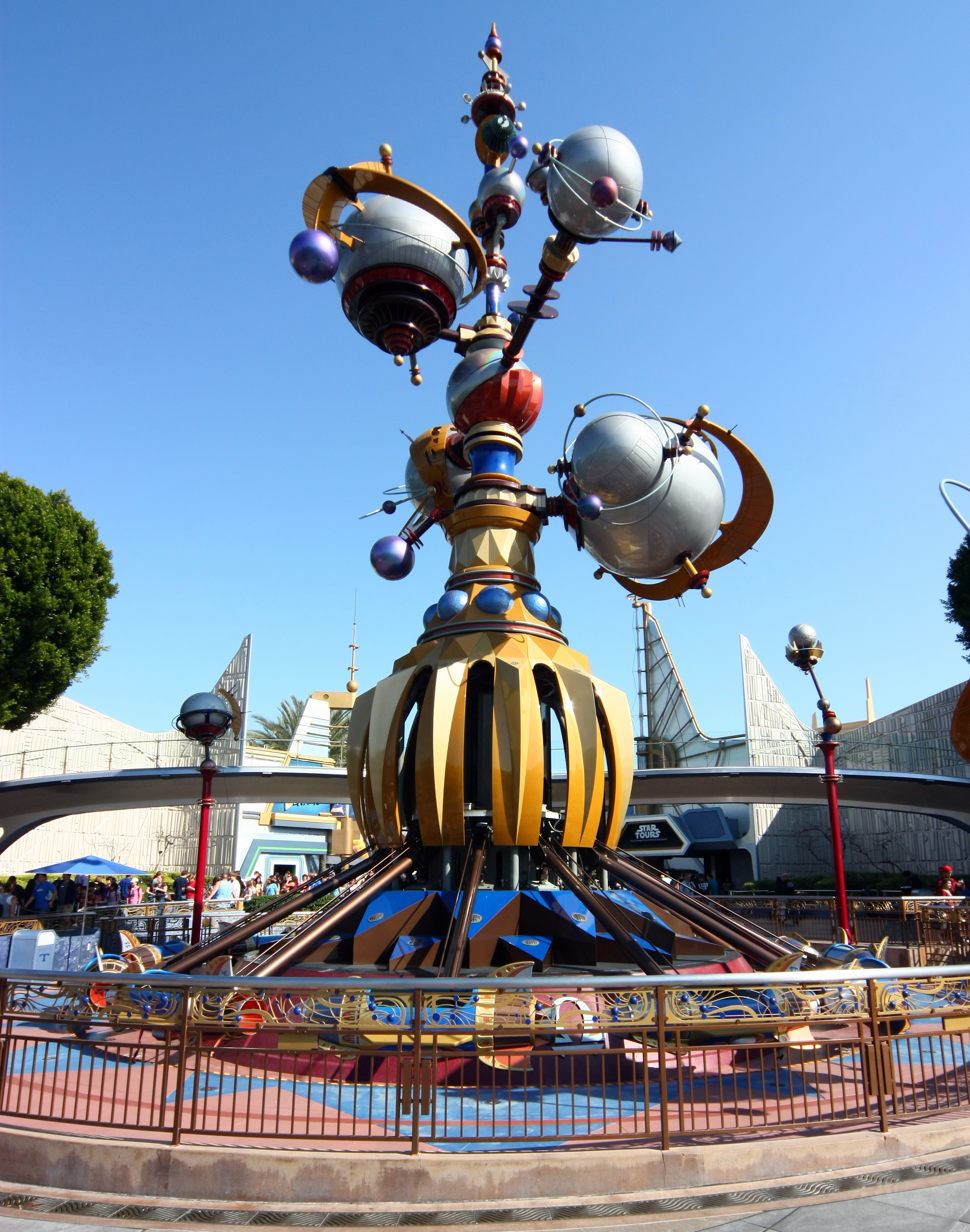
- Astro Orbitor at Disneyland

Magic Kingdom
- Area: Tomorrowland
- Coordinates: 28.4184°N 81.57916°W
- Status: Operating
- Opening date: November 28, 1974 (as Star Jets); April 30, 1994 (as Astro Orbiter)
- Closing date: January 10, 1994 (as Star Jets)

Tokyo Disneyland
- Name: Star Jets
- Area: Tomorrowland
- Coordinates: 35.6313°N 139.8796°E
- Status: Removed
- Opening date: April 15, 1983
- Closing date: October 10, 2017
- Replaced by: The Happy Ride with Baymax

Disneyland Park (Paris)
- Name: Orbitron
- Area: Discoveryland
- Coordinates: 48.8736°N 2.7784°E
- Status: Operating
- Opening date: April 12, 1992

Disneyland
- Name: Astro Orbitor
- Area: Tomorrowland
- Coordinates: 33.8121°N 117.9183°W
- Status: Operating
- Opening date: May 22, 1998
- Replaced: Rocket Jets

Hong Kong Disneyland
- Name: Orbitron
- Area: Tomorrowland
- Coordinates: 22.3136°N 114.0418°E
- Status: Operating
- Opening date: September 12, 2005

Shanghai Disneyland
- Name: Jet Packs
- Area: Tomorrowland
- Coordinates: 31.14375°N 121.65439°E
- Status: Operating
- Soft opening date: May 7, 2016
- Opening date: June 16, 2016

Ride statistics
- Attraction type: Aerial carousel
- Designer: WED Enterprises/Walt Disney Imagineering
- Vehicle type: Rockets (all except Hong Kong Disneyland); Flying saucers (Hong Kong Disneyland)
- Vehicles: 12; 16 (Hong Kong Disneyland)
- Riders per vehicle: 2 (all except Hong Kong Disneyland); 4 (Hong Kong Disneyland)
- Rows: 2 (Hong Kong Disneyland)
- Duration: 1:30
- Must transfer from wheelchair

The Astro Orbiter is a "rocket-spinner", aerial carousel-type attraction featured at five Disneyland-style parks and Walt Disney Resorts around the world, except for Tokyo Disneyland, where it is replaced by The Happy Ride with Baymax. Although each ride may have a slightly different name, all share the same experience of vehicles traveling through space, spinning around a central monument. In most forms of the ride, the use of a joystick (or steering wheel, buttons, etc.) enables guests to adjust the height of their individual cars at will, usually within a range of no more than 10-15 feet. When the ride cycle comes to its completion, any ascended vehicles are automatically lowered for passenger exit and re-boarding. Over the years, with each new iteration of the ride debuting, new designs, thematic schemes, and locations have been implemented to fit with the changing themes of several Tomorrowlands.

== History ==
=== Disneyland ===
In 1956, the first rocket-spinner attraction opened at Disneyland and was known as the Astro Jets. The attraction was made by Klaus Company Bavaria and similar to several versions found in traveling carnivals. The "jets" made a 50-foot circle around a large red-checkered rocket and guests were able climb upwards of 36 feet in their ride vehicles from the ground level they were boarded at. The attraction stood between the Submarine Voyage and Rocket to the Moon.

The name Astro Jets was changed in 1964 when United Airlines, as a new park sponsor (sponsoring "The Enchanted Tiki Room"), contended the name was free advertising for American Airlines' coast-to-coast Astrojet service. After this dispute, the name was changed to Tomorrowland Jets. The name lasted until September 1966, when the attraction was closed to make room for the new renovated Tomorrowland.

The attraction returned in August 1967 as the Rocket Jets. This version was located on top of the new PeopleMover platform, and was accessible from ground level via an elevator. The focal point of this version was its replica Saturn V/NASA-themed rocket in the center. This version remained open until 1997, when it closed for renovations with the rest of Tomorrowland. The new form of the attraction opened one year later as Astro Orbitor. The new version is a replica of the Orbitron, Machines Volantes at Disneyland Paris.

The Astro Orbitor at Disneyland was planned to be placed where the Rocket Jets were, but weighed too much for the current building. Instead, it was relocated to the entrance of Tomorrowland, and placed on ground level, thus making the ride the new focal point as guests step from the main plaza of Disneyland into Tomorrowland. One concept drawing had guests boarding the attraction underground and others had the center of the attraction featuring a water moat (similar to the "Dumbo the Flying Elephant" attraction in Fantasyland). Neither ideas were ever carried out.

The mechanism for Rocket Jets on top of the PeopleMover was re-used as a kinetic satellite-themed sculpture known as the Observatron, built from the same skeletal structure. The Observatron was originally planned to come to life every fifteen minutes and appear to summon signs from the skies, while a selected soundtrack (such as selected music pieces from Space Mountain and Le Visionarium at Disneyland Paris) would play over Tomorrowland. However, the mechanism has been prone to failure and occasionally will be inactive for periods of months or only play sporadically on certain days. It is unknown if the Observatron still functions.

In April 2009, the Astro Orbitor at Disneyland closed for refurbishment and was stripped down to its skeletal structure. It reopened in June 2009 with a silver, blue, red, and gold trim color scheme.

=== Magic Kingdom ===
Astro Orbiter at Magic Kingdom

No form of the attraction existed in the Magic Kingdom at Walt Disney World until 1974, three years after the park's opening, when Tomorrowland underwent a massive expansion including the creation of Space Mountain, a new location for the Disneyland-attraction, Carousel of Progress, and the WEDWay PeopleMover. The Star Jets were considered the focal point of Tomorrowland due to its soaring, spinning rockets and central location.

This version of the attraction was based on the Disneyland version, in both location (on top of the PeopleMover platform) and in style (both feature a large Saturn V rocket as the centerpiece). However the attraction vehicles were different from any other previous form as they were much larger and featured a flatter back-end and larger tail fins. While Disneyland's Rocket Jets resembled actual rockets, the Magic Kingdom's Star Jets appeared more like space shuttles. Each of the 12 open-air vehicles was attached to the central axis by a 20-foot arm. The vehicles held up to two passengers who circled round and round, 60 feet above the ground, while controlling their ascent and descent with a metal control stick. On January 10, 1994, the original Star Jets closed in order to undergo a complete makeover as part of the New Tomorrowland.

The attraction was re-designed and re-opened on April 30, 1994, as the Astro Orbiter, part of the complete renovation of the park's Tomorrowland section. The attraction featured a highly stylized iron-work tower in lieu of the center rocket along with various planets on the outside of the attraction as to appear as if the rockets were weaving between the planets. The ride at the Magic Kingdom does 11 rotations per minute and averages 1.2 million miles a year. In the 1994-2009 narration for the Tomorrowland Transit Authority, the ride was referenced as the "League of Planets Astro Orbiter."

=== Tokyo Disneyland ===
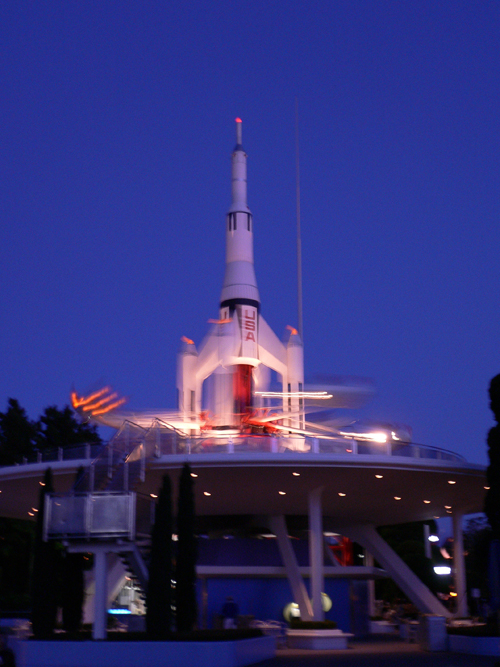
Star Jets at Tokyo Disneyland before it was removed in 2017

The version prepared for Tokyo Disneyland debuted with the park in April 1983, sharing its name ("Star Jets") and design with the first Magic Kingdom version. Even though the park does not have a PeopleMover attraction, designers nonetheless placed their attraction atop an elevated platform similar to that at Florida's Magic Kingdom. This attraction closed on October 10, 2017, and was replaced by The Happy Ride with Baymax.

=== Disneyland Park (Paris) ===
The opening of Euro Disneyland in April 1992 marked a significant change in the design of Tomorrowland. Known as Discoveryland, the land took on a retro-science-fiction style inspired by some of Europe's greatest writers, such as Jules Verne and H. G. Wells. As such, Orbitron's central axis resembles a bronze 19th century rotating planetarium instead of a rocket. This design was exported to the Disneyland Resort in California when Tomorrowland was renovated in 1998. This was also the first version of the attraction to be installed at ground level instead of atop an elevated platform.

=== Hong Kong Disneyland ===
Like the other international Disneyland parks, Hong Kong Disneyland opened in September 2005 with its own version, known as the Orbitron, a modified version of the Parisian one. In order to improve the attraction's capacity, the rockets became "flying saucers" and were made large enough to accommodate an average of four riders per saucer, in two rows of two riders.

=== Shanghai Disneyland ===
It is known as Jet Packs at Shanghai Disneyland. It opened on the same day as Shanghai Disneyland opened, June 16, 2016.

== See also ==
- Incidents at Disney parks
- List of Disneyland attractions
- Magic Kingdom attraction and entertainment history
- Tokyo Disneyland attraction and entertainment history
