= Paoro =

Maōri mythical entity

Paoro is a mythical entity that appears in early Māori creation myths.

The name Paoro (meaning echo) appears in John White's English translation of a Māori story attributed by him to the Ngāti Hau tribe, as a personal name meaning 'Echo'. However, in the Māori language original which White also supplies, the name Paoro does not appear – instead the word used is 'pari-kārangaranga', "echoing cliff".

In the Māori story, Mārikoriko (Twilight) is the first woman, created by Ārohirohi (Shimmering heat) from the heat of the sun (Kau-ata-ata) and the echoing cliff (Paoro). She married Tiki, the first man, and gave birth to Hine-kau-ataata (Woman floating in shadows).
