= 20,000 Leagues Under the Sea: Submarine Voyage =

Former dark ride at the Magic Kingdom theme park

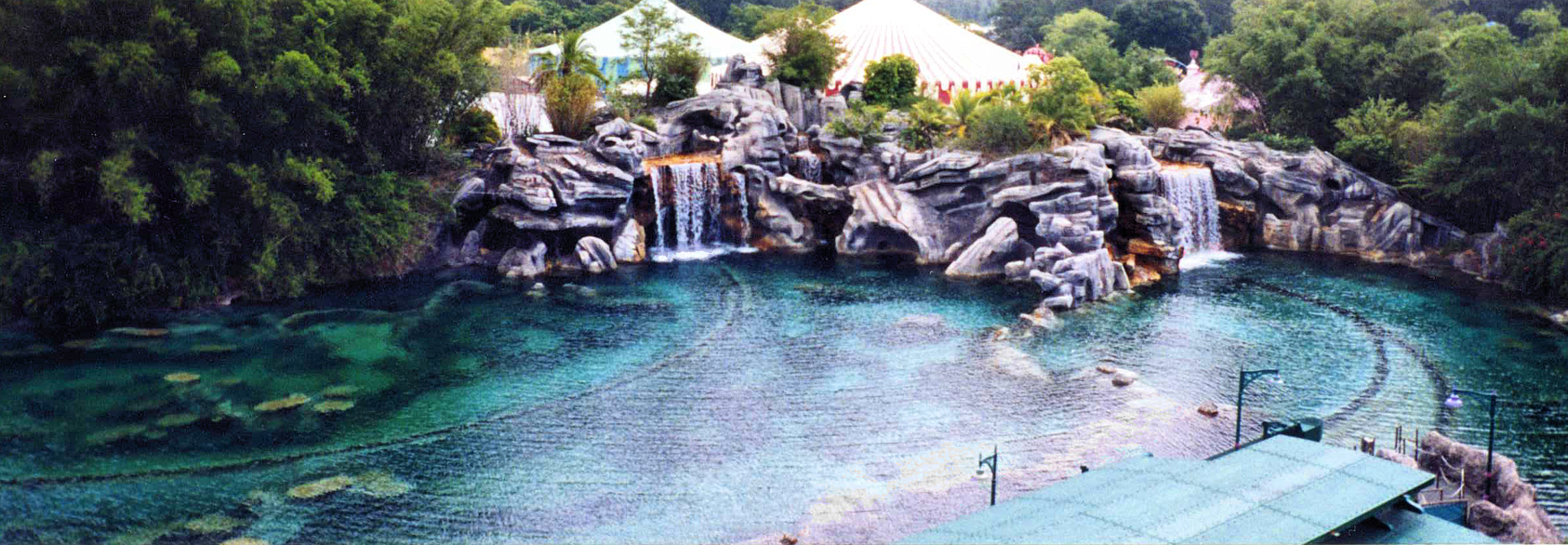
- 20,000 Leagues Under the Sea: Submarine Voyage at Magic Kingdom in 1998, four years after closure

Magic Kingdom
- Area: Fantasyland
- Status: Removed
- Opening date: October 14, 1971
- Closing date: September 5, 1994
- Replaced by: Ariel's Grotto (1996–2004); Pooh's Playful Spot (2005–2010); Under the Sea ~ Journey of the Little Mermaid (2012–present); Seven Dwarfs Mine Train (2014–present)

Ride statistics
- Host: Captain Nemo (Peter Reneday)

20,000 Leagues Under the Sea: Submarine Voyage was an attraction at the Magic Kingdom theme park at Walt Disney World from 1971 to 1994. Based on the characters and settings of the 1954 Disney film 20,000 Leagues Under the Sea, which was adapted from Jules Verne's 1870 novel Twenty Thousand Leagues Under the Seas, it was a re-theming of the Submarine Voyage attraction at Disneyland. The ride involved a 20-minute submarine ride through a lagoon filled with sea life and mermaids.

== The Submarine Voyage ==
In 1959, an ambitious expansion of Tomorrowland in Disneyland was completed, which included the addition of new attractions, including the Matterhorn Bobsleds, Monorail, and Submarine Voyage. "Commissioned" on June 6, 1959, in front of Richard Nixon, Walt Disney and his wife Lillian, and officers of the US Navy, the attraction made use of early animatronics to create underwater life, and the use of forced perspective to increase the feeling of realism.

Eight submarines painted in grey took guests through the attraction, which took place in a lagoon visible from Tomorrowland and a large show building hidden behind two waterfalls. It became extremely popular with guests, and Walt Disney Imagineering consequently planned for more elaborate version for the forthcoming Florida Project concept, which became Walt Disney World.

== Vehicles ==
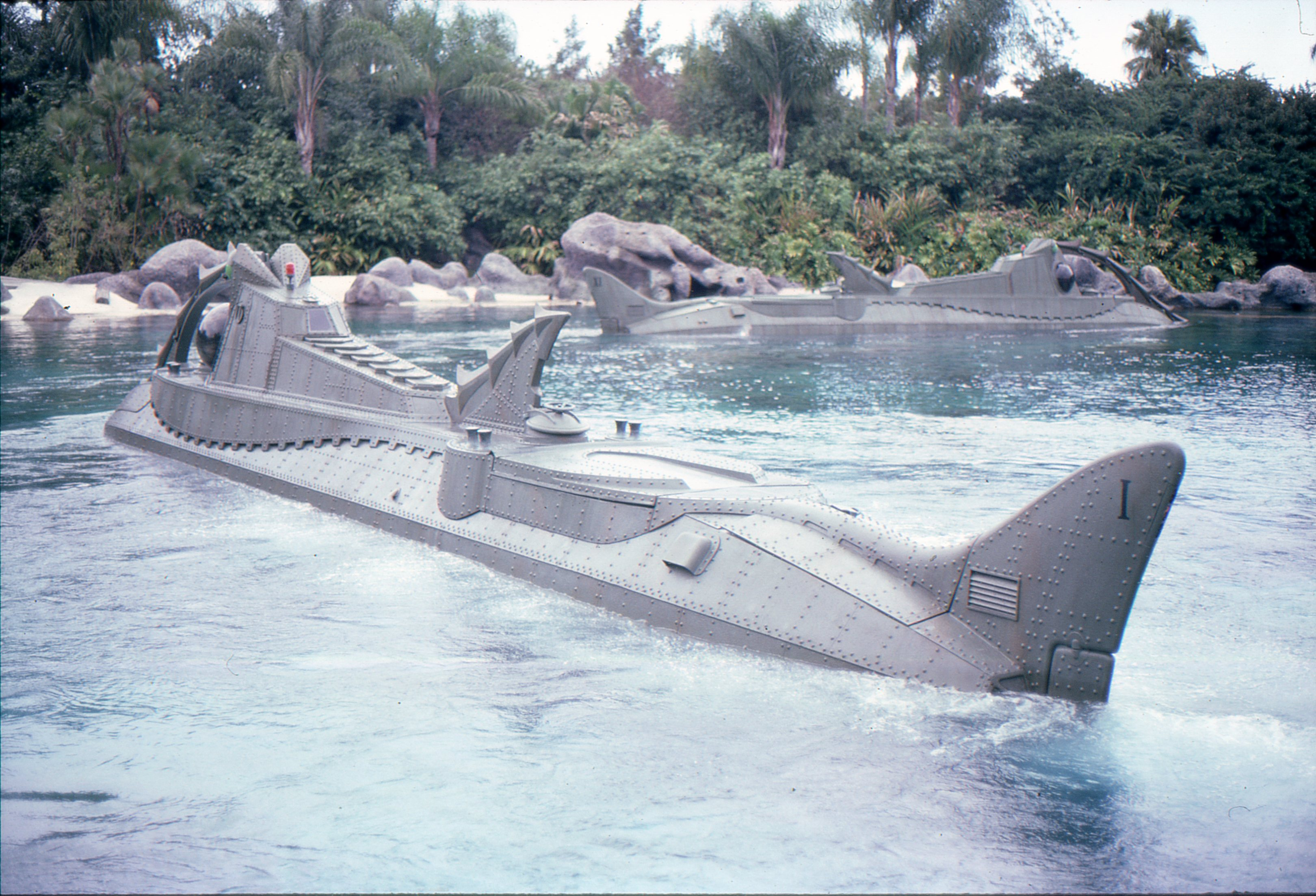
"Submarines" of the 20,000 Leagues ride, in 1979.

One of the signature pieces of 20,000 Leagues Under the Sea was the fleet of passenger vehicles, adapted for theme park use from Harper Goff's Nautilus design for the 1954 Disney live-action version, by Disney Imagineer George McGinnis. The basic hulls were constructed by Morgan Yachts in Clearwater, Florida, with the final building work being transferred to Tampa Ship midway through. Another veteran Imagineer, Bob Gurr, oversaw the project. Upon delivery at Walt Disney World in August 1971, the vehicles weighed some forty tons, and were installed into a concrete guide track, mounted on top of a mechanism that limited "bumping" accidents.

The attraction vehicles were not actual submarines, but instead boats in which the guests sat below water level. The interiors were a mix of metal paneling, rivets, and bolts, as well as Victorian-esque fittings in the form of passenger seats that could flip outwards, and armrests beneath the portholes, in keeping with the Goff concept. Each "guest" aboard the Nautilus had their own seat, as well as a round porthole to look out into the attraction. A small button located in the porthole recess was intended for defogging the window if needed, though this rarely worked. Located at the top of the window recess was a small speaker through which Captain Nemo's voice, by veteran voice actor Peter Renaday, doing an impression of James Mason, guided his guests through their underwater adventure.

Above the seating area was the "sail", as it was known to the employees, where the "helmsman" stood and controlled the vehicle's operation. The "diving" effect was produced by bubble machines located throughout the attraction, as well as using the waterfalls at the entrance to the show building.

Each of the twelve vehicles accommodated forty riders. Vehicles normally cycled through the attraction in packs of three.

== Ride experience ==
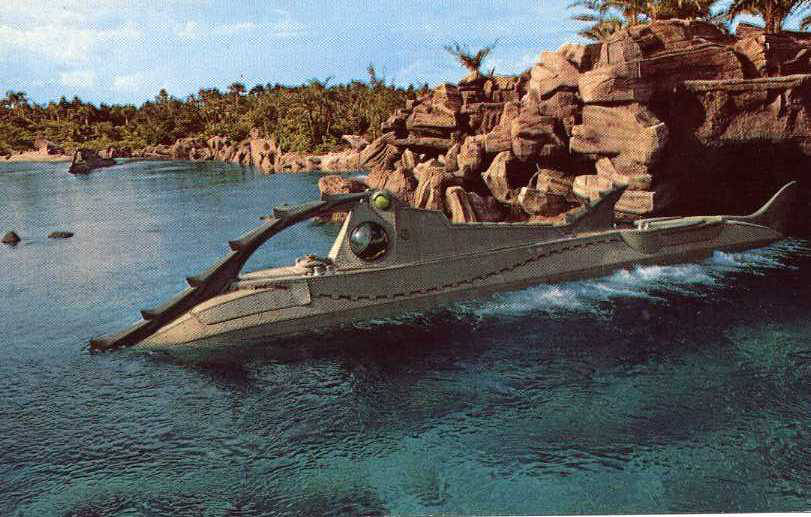
20,000 Leagues Under the Sea at Disney World

Despite the extensive 20,000 Leagues Under The Sea overhaul the attraction was given, essentially it was still the same as its Californian counterpart Submarine Voyage, in both its underwater show scenes and narration, except for a few occasional differences.

The adventure began as the guests made their way down into the back of the submarine, bending to miss the low-level raised rear hatch, and finding a place on board. Throughout the voyage, an eerie organ version of the Disney film's main theme played on a never-ending loop, allowing for a narration backing, as well as a piece of stall music if required. Following the standard Disney-style introduction and safety notes from the helmsman, the narration began, in the voice of Captain Nemo.

With the submarine clear of the dock, the diving sequence began, with hundreds of air bubbles filling the porthole view, creating the illusion of descent. Once clear, the Captain introduced himself to his passengers, and then introduced them to the underwater plains around Vulcania. In the lagoon, guests could see moray eels, crabs, lobsters, sea bass, clams and turtles and a host of smaller tropical fish.

Minutes later, in another tribute to the Disney film, an "underwater party" of divers would come into view, as animatronics wearing replicas of the Harper Goff-designed deep sea diving equipment worked kelp beds and wrangled with rebellious turtles.

With the bubbles from the waterfall at the cavern entrance simulating a surface storm, the Captain would order the submarine down into the depths as a precaution, and the guests enter the show building section of the attraction. Within minutes, the devastation such natural phenomenon can create was made clear with the ominous Graveyard of Lost Ships, with shipwrecks from various centuries littering the sea bed, guarded by the silent, gliding figures of sharks.

Leaving the destruction behind, the Nautilus reached the North Pole, circumnavigating the Polar Ice Cap from below the surface, and narrowly avoiding large icebergs stabbing through the water. Venturing deeper, the Nautilus entered the eerie world of the Abyss, where guests viewed examples the many weird and strange species of deepwater fish that thrive in such an environment.

Rising slightly, one of the final discoveries made is the ruins of Atlantis, along with a typical Disney-fied two-armed sea serpent, accompanying mermaids that can apparently tame it, and a treasury bursting with jewels and gold. With the ruins of the ancient civilization soon left behind, the Nautilus entered the final phase of its journey, with a tribute to the most iconic and memorable part of the 1954 Disney film: the attack of the giant squid. After seeing a much smaller sister Nautilus trapped in the clutches of one such creature, marked XIII on the tailfin, the passenger submarine was attacked by long, thrashing tentacles.

With a final push to the surface, the Nautilus cleared the caverns of the dangerous squid, and enter the safety of the tropical lagoon, on its way towards the dock.

== Closure ==
Though the attraction was a guest favorite and remained popular throughout its existence, it was expensive to maintain, as well as having a low hourly loading capacity for an attraction of its size and expense. It was closed on September 5, 1994, without advance notice, for what was outwardly termed a temporary maintenance period. The ride was set to reopen in the summer of 1996, but in April 1996, the closure was officially made permanent. Despite the closure, the attraction had a narrated slideshow topic in the 1996 application The Walt Disney World Explorer and its 1998 Second Edition release. It was the only closed attraction to be a full topic in the application and thus was referred to in the past tense in narration.

Post-closure, several vehicles were left stationary in the lagoon and by the dock, before the entire fleet was pulled from the attraction in 1996. The submarines were regularly moved around to different locations in Walt Disney World backstage for several years, until being stripped and buried in a landfill in 2004. Two of the vehicles were saved from the fleet's demise. They were shipped to be sunk in the snorkeling lagoon at Castaway Cay, Disney's private island. Here, the submarines were placed in and around the snorkeling lagoon and covered with cargo netting to help sea life cling to them.

Today, only one of those two submarines still exist, one of which was destroyed by hurricane weather. A third submarine was a shell made from the original subs and it was found in the special effects water tank of the backlot tour at Disney's Hollywood Studios from 1991 until c.2000, when the tank was rethemed to Pearl Harbor. The sub was removed and moved to an empty lot backstage. Today, it is in storage but is taken out and displayed at Disney events, still in good condition.

The lagoon remained as a scenic viewpoint, and was renamed "Ariel's Grotto", complete with a King Triton spouting statue until 2004, when the water was drained and the sets and infrastructure were demolished. Pooh's Playful Spot was built where the attraction formerly stood and operated between 2005 and 2010 before making way for the Seven Dwarfs Mine Train as part of the Fantasyland Expansion. The exterior to The Little Mermaid: Ariel's Undersea Adventure contains a silhouette of the Nautilus in a rock wall and the tiki bar Trader Sam's Grog Grotto at Disney's Polynesian Village Resort serves a cocktail called the "Nautilus" which is served in a stylized drinking vessel resembling the submarine.

== See also ==
- 20,000 Leagues Under the Sea
- Submarine Voyage
- Finding Nemo Submarine Voyage

General:

- List of Magic Kingdom attractions
