= Finding Nemo Submarine Voyage =

Attraction at Disneyland

Coordinates: 33.8129°N 117.9172°W

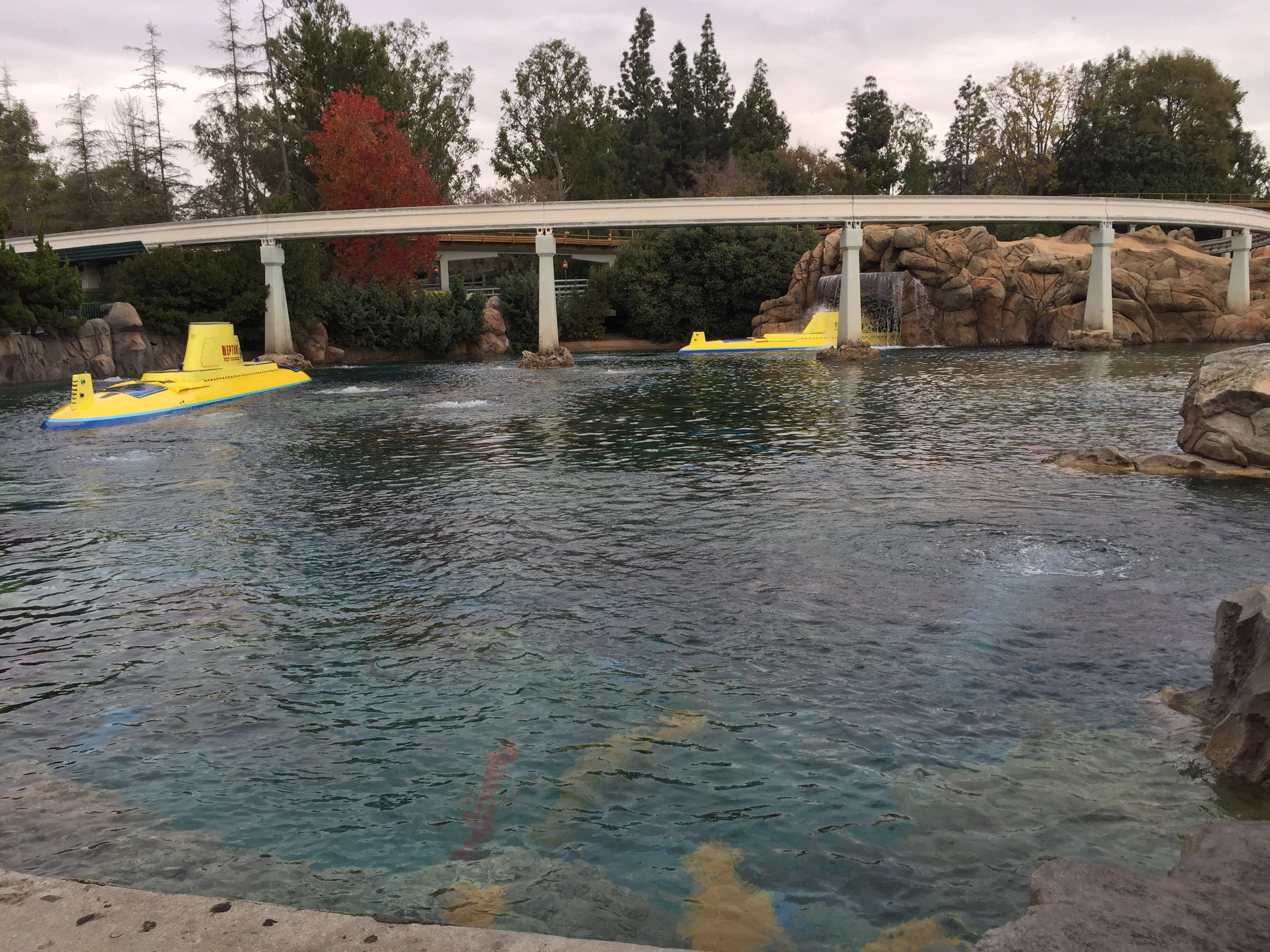
- Finding Nemo Submarine Voyage in January 2015

Disneyland
- Area: Tomorrowland
- Status: Operating
- Soft opening date: June 9, 2007
- Opening date: June 11, 2007
- Replaced: Submarine Voyage

Ride statistics
- Attraction type: Undersea voyage
- Designer: Walt Disney Imagineering
- Theme: Finding Nemo
- Music: Ed Kalnins (Inspired by the film score by Thomas Newman)
- Vehicle type: Submarines
- Riders per vehicle: 40
- Duration: 13:45
- Audio-Animatronics: 126
- Total Water: 6,300,000 US gallons (24,000 m^{3})

Finding Nemo Submarine Voyage is an attraction in the Tomorrowland area of Disneyland in Anaheim, California. It opened on June 11, 2007. Based on the characters and settings of Pixar's 2003 film Finding Nemo, it is a re-theming of the Submarine Voyage attraction that operated from 1959 to 1998.

== History ==
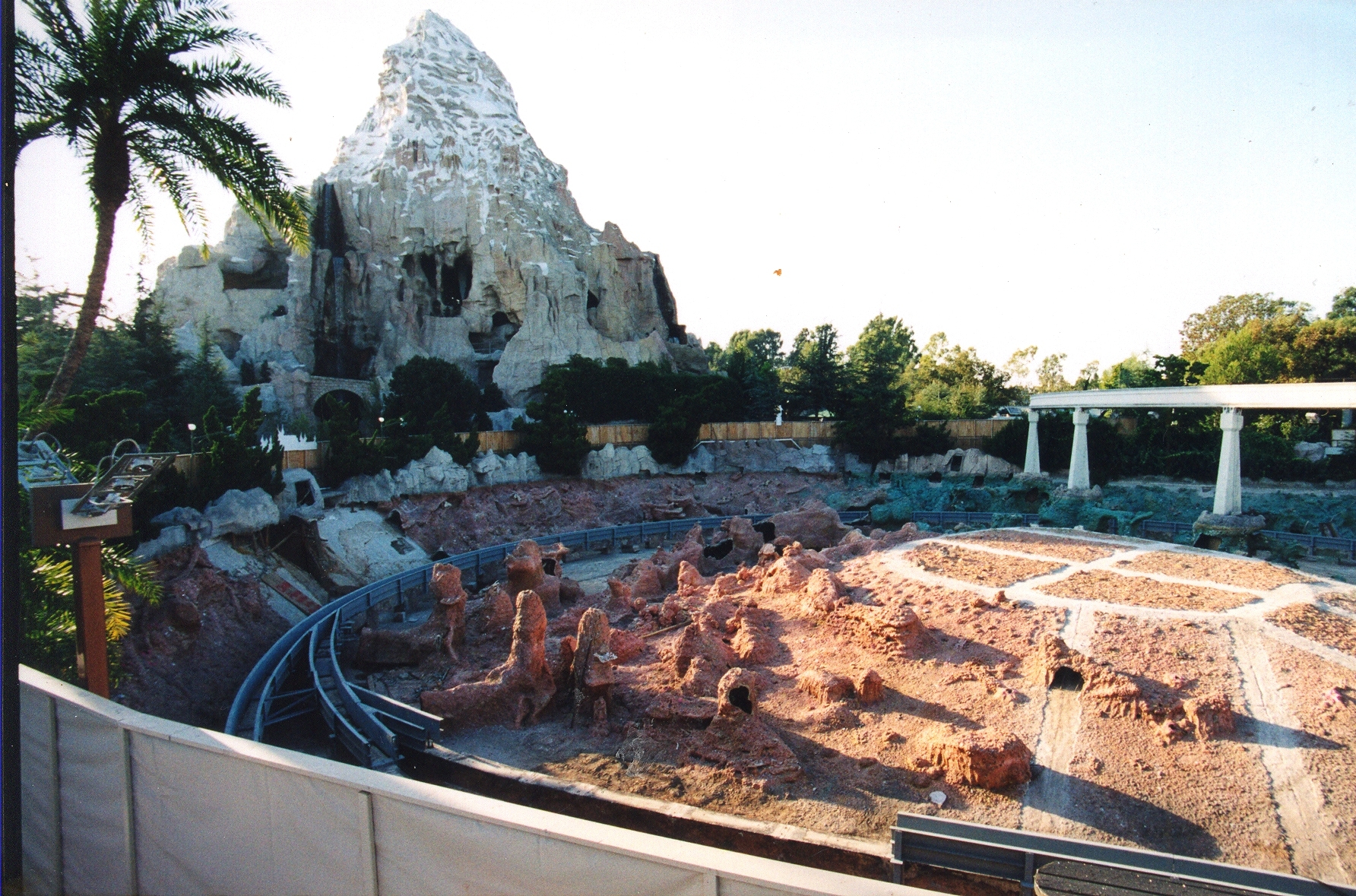
The Submarine lagoon drained while Finding Nemo was under construction. Matterhorn Bobsleds can be seen in the background. Photo by Mike Johansen.

The original Submarine Voyage, built in 1959 as part of the new Tomorrowland, was loosely based on the USS Nautilus, the first nuclear-powered submarine, and its voyage to the North Pole in 1958. On July 29, 1998, it was announced that the ride would be closed on September 7, and that it would reopen with a new theme by 2003. On its final day of operation, Imagineer Tony Baxter told then-Disneyland president Paul Pressler, "This is one of the worst days of my life." Baxter was one of many Imagineers who campaigned to bring the attraction back with a new theme.

One of the first attempts to resurrect the subs was to create an attraction based on Disney Animation's 2001 film Atlantis: The Lost Empire. A mock-up was built to test the concept; but when the film failed at the box office, those plans were shelved. The next year, an attempt was made to re-theme the attraction on Disney Animation's 2002 film Treasure Planet, but it too was a commercial failure. A theme based on Disney Animation's 1989 film The Little Mermaid was also briefly considered. During this time, the lagoon remained as scenery. At one point, Disneyland executives considered removing the submarines, feeling they occupied too much of the park's storage space. Imagineering creative chief Marty Sklar hired a naval engineering firm to inspect the subs, and they determined they had 40 to 50 years of life left in them, saving them from destruction.

The special effects team at Walt Disney Imagineering eventually developed new projection technology; and around the same time, the Pixar film Finding Nemo was in development, which had potential for a Submarine Voyage re-theme. Matt Ouimet became president of Disneyland Resort in 2003, and in 2004 there was new activity in the Submarine lagoon. One of the original eight subs was moored at the old Submarine Voyage dock for inspection by Imagineering. Rumors spread over the Internet that an attraction based on Finding Nemo would replace Submarine Voyage. The subs were tested to see if new animated show scenes could be visible from their portholes. A mock-up of the new technology was created and a presentation was staged for Ouimet. In spite of the enormous price tag, Ouimet was impressed and the Finding Nemo theme for the Submarine Voyage was green-lighted. It was the first major theme park project for Bob Iger, who became CEO of the Walt Disney Company in 2005, and the first major project for John Lasseter (executive producer of Finding Nemo, and then-chief creative officer of Pixar and Disney Animation) in his role as Principal Creative Advisor for Imagineering.

On July 15, 2005, two days before the 50th Anniversary of Disneyland, the Finding Nemo Submarine Voyage was officially announced at the new Turtle Talk with Crush attraction at Disney California Adventure by then-Disney Experiences President Jay Rasulo.

For the attraction, the Imagineers used more than 30 tons of recycled crushed glass to "paint" the lagoon's coral and rockwork. They also created more than 40 colors for the lagoon area, such as Yamber (a cross between yam and amber), Mango Mud, Toast, Blue Feint (barely blue), Aqua Jazz, Swamp (dark green/amber), Danger Red, Burning Coal, Split Pea, Earth, Phantom and Peritwinkle. The submarines were also converted from diesel fuel to electric power.

In 2008, Finding Nemo Submarine Voyage received an award for outstanding achievement from the Themed Entertainment Association.

On January 6, 2014, the attraction closed and the lagoon drained for extended refurbishment to make improvements to the rockwork and coral. It reopened on September 27, 2014.

Although Disneyland reopened on April 30, 2021 from its closure due to the COVID-19 pandemic, the attraction remained temporarily closed. It reopened on July 25, 2022. During its closure, the lagoon was drained and the attraction was refurbished with fresh paint, new coral, kelp, and seaweed, and received enhanced special effects and lighting. A figure of Hank from the Finding Nemo sequel Finding Dory (2016) was also placed atop a rock in the lagoon.

== Voyage ==
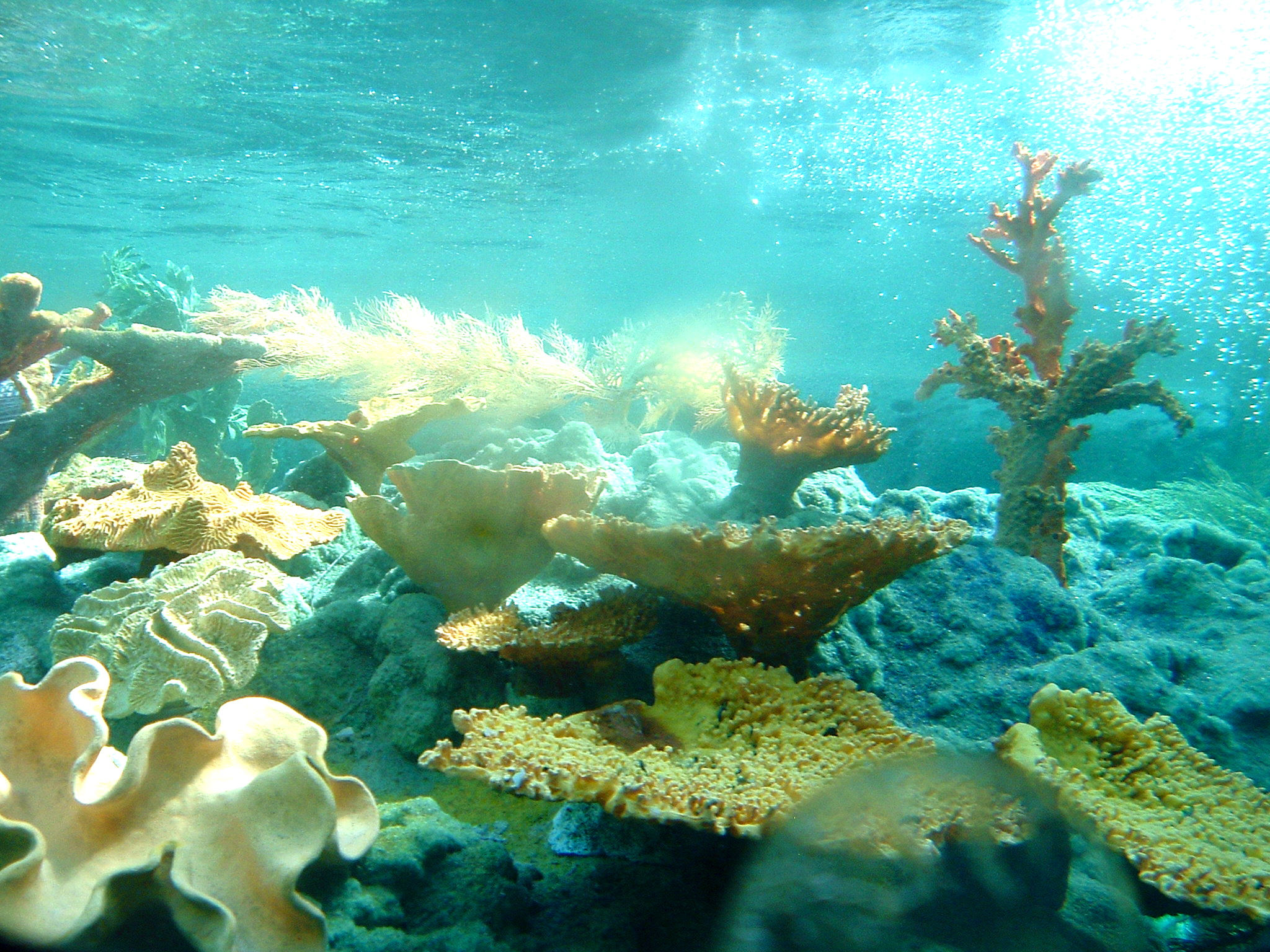
View of the lagoon from inside one of the submarines

At the attraction's entrance, guests enter the institute of Nautical Exploration and Marine Observation (NEMO). Three seagulls, perched on a nearby buoy, cry out "Mine! Mine! Mine!" every few moments. Guests board one of NEMO's eight yellow research submarines and set out in search of an active underwater volcano. Through their portholes, guests view a colorful underwater environment. One of the first things guests see is Darla, the niece of dentist P. Sherman in Finding Nemo, freediving amid the coral, holding a plastic bag with a fish she has captured.

As the journey continues, guests see a giant sea bass swimming through a seaweed forest. The submarines then enter the ruins of an ancient civilization, which are being explored by P. Sherman who is scuba diving. Among the ruins lies two gigantic tiki heads, embedded in the ocean floor. The subs then enter a coral reef with many bright reflective colors. Giant clams slowly open and close as the submarines pass. The captain commands the sub to dive much deeper to avoid a surface storm ahead.

At this point the submarine travels through a waterfall and enters the hidden ride building, where guests find themselves apparently moving through underwater caverns. The captain announces that, due to advancements in marine technology, they can use "sonar hydrophones" (an homage to the original attraction), to hear the fish talk. The sub passes through a dark cavern where huge eels lunge toward it, and lobsters can also be seen. The sub passes Marlin and Dory as they discover that Nemo has gotten lost again. Farther along the reef, guests encounter Mr. Ray and his class swimming through the coral looking for Nemo as well. The first mate announces that the sub is approaching the East Australian Current, and the submarine enters the current along with Nemo, Squirt, Crush and other green sea turtles.

The sub then exits the current and enters a graveyard of sunken ships, Jacques and Blenny can both be seen nearby while Marlin and Dory continue their search for Nemo. Bruce and Chum swim inside a sunken submarine surrounded by mines. The submarine "hits" one of the mines, causing all the mines to explode and the sub to shake and temporarily lose power. As the sub goes dark, Marlin and Dory are surrounded by small glowing lights, which turn out to be phosphorescent lights on several huge deep-sea anglerfish. After they escape the creatures, they make their way through a forest of jellyfish.

The submarine reaches the active deep-sea volcano. Gill, Bloat, Gurgle, Bubbles, and Squirt chant as lava flows down the volcano's sides, while Marlin and Dory reunite with Nemo. The volcano erupts just as the sub escapes and returns to the reef. The fish gather around and celebrate finding Nemo once again. Suddenly, a pod of humpback whales appears, and one of them swallows both Dory and the submarine. Dory swims about trying to understand the whale's vocalizations. After a few moments, the whale shoots the submarine and Dory out through its blowhole. Dory then mistakes the sub for a "big yellow whale" and speaks whale, saying goodbye.

The captain tells the first mate not to enter anything that has happened in the ship's log because nobody would believe it. He then says they should bring the sub up to the surface "before we have a run-in with a sea serpent or an encounter with a mermaid" (references to the original attraction, which included mermaids and a sea serpent). Two rock formations can be seen, one shaped like a sea serpent's head, and the other shaped like a mermaid. The sub then surfaces and reenters the harbor, where a pair of king crabs snap at air bubbles coming from a sewage pipe. An instrumental version of "Beyond the Sea" plays as the submarine docks and the captain thanks the passengers for riding.

== Submarines ==
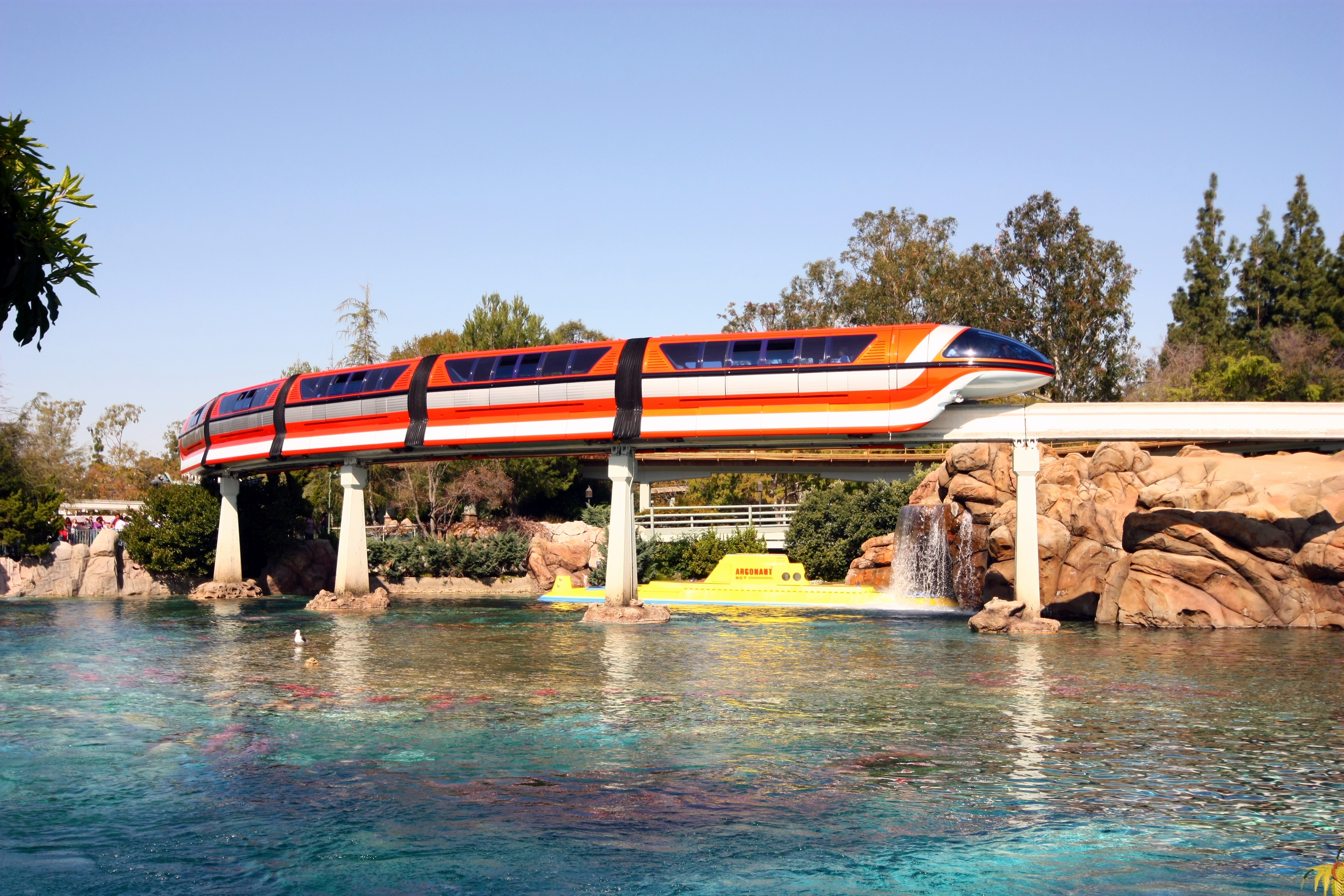
The submarine Argonaut passing under monorail orange in 2010

The attraction reuses the eight original 1959 Submarine Voyage through Liquid Space attraction vehicle hulls built at the Todd Shipyards in San Pedro, California. Vertical rollers attached at each end of the keel roll within a submerged guide channel. The original diesel engines were replaced by electric battery-powered propulsion units which are charged at the loading dock by contact-less inductive coils, increasing efficiency and eliminating fuel spills. Guests board through a hatch at either end by crossing hinged loading ramps and descending spiral stairs. Twenty aft-boarding guests are seated facing the starboard side and fore-boarding guests are seated facing port. Each submarine originally seated 38 guests, but removal of the diesel engines increased seating to 40 spring-loaded fiberglass seats. Lap sitting of small children is permitted. 46 on-board flotation devices limit maximum capacity to 45 guests and one helmsman. When the boarding ramps are raised the hatches are sealed watertight (but not airtight) and mooring lines released. Although their viewports are below water level, the "submarines" do not actually submerge when "diving". Descent and submersion is simulated with bubbles that rise across the viewports when the vehicles pass through compressed air released under the hull and waterfalls. Each viewport blows fresh dehumidified air across its glass to prevent fogging. Each cabin interior has 40 viewports framed with dark blue mesh, and a wavy blue stripe painted across the ceiling. The original subs' exteriors were painted navy gray; the new livery colors are bright yellow above water, a light blue 'boot stripe' at the waterline, and a reflection-reducing matte blue-black below the waterline.

The sail of each submarine, from which the helmsman operates, has a control console and a board of indicator lights displaying the submarine's status if anything abnormal occurs on the ride's cycle. Cast members are trained how to respond to each abnormality, and are always in contact with other operating positions of the ride. Although the submarine is on a guideway, the helmsman controls its forward and backward movement via a small joystick to regulate these speeds (shown in RPM, in lieu of the actual propeller which moves the boat) which vary in different sections of the ride. Cast members operating the submarines guide them through a series of laser sensors that activate each show scene. Guiding timers and block-lights are placed throughout the ride to help cast members time each scene.

The helmsman unlocks the sub's watertight hatches via levers in the sail, each time it returns to dock. Each sail also has a flashlight, checklists for the ride's opening and closing crews, and a radio to communicate with other boats and stations.

The queue, docks, subs and scenes were all re-themed to represent the movie's Australian harbor, and the captain and his first mate speak with Australian accents.

To accommodate guests with conditions preventing them from boarding the subs, the adjacent Marine Observation Outpost (M.O.O.) has a high definition LCD screen featuring a version of the show that is similar to the underwater attraction.

=== Names ===
- 107 Nautilus
- 207 Scout, formerly Neptune, formerly Seawolf
- 307 Voyager, formerly Sea Star, formerly Skate
- 407 Mariner, formerly Explorer, formerly Skipjack
- 507 Seafarer, formerly Seeker, formerly Triton
- 607 Explorer, formerly Argonaut, formerly George Washington
- 707 Neptune, formerly Triton, formerly Patrick Henry
- 807 Argonaut, formerly Sea Wolf, formerly Ethan Allen

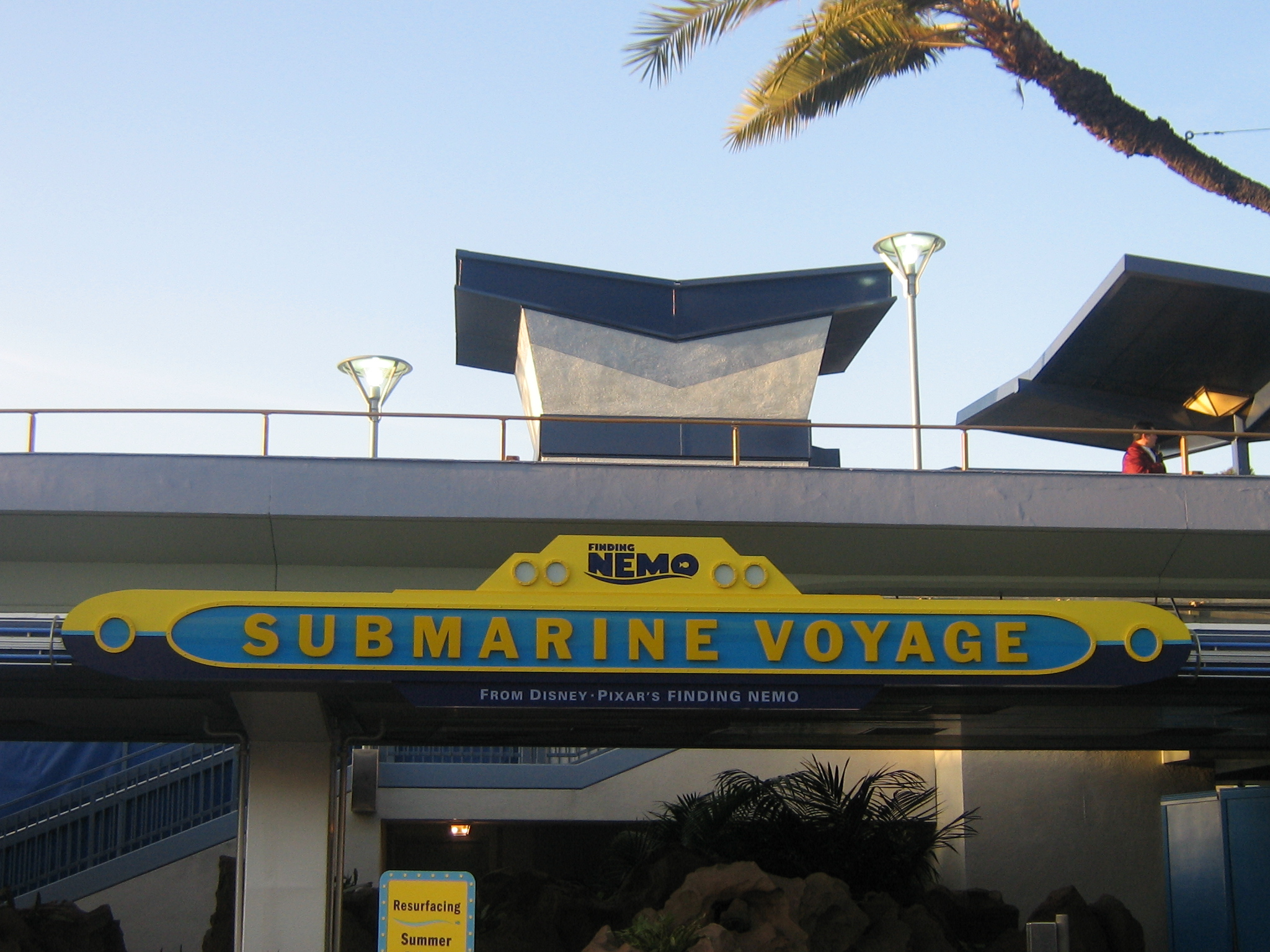
Attraction entrance in 2007

== See also ==
- Submarine Voyage
- List of Disneyland attractions
