= E ticket =

Highest tier of Disneyland admission tickets pre-1982

Disneyland E ticket, c. 1975–77

An E ticket (officially an E coupon) was a type of admission ticket used at the Disneyland and Magic Kingdom theme parks before 1982, where it admitted the bearer to the newest, most advanced, or popular rides and attractions.

It is now commonly used to describe a category of top tier and cutting edge theme park attractions. The term is especially common in describing Disney attractions of such a tier.

== Origin ==
When Disneyland opened in 1955, visitors purchased an admission ticket to the park at the main gate booths and then purchased separate admission inside for each attraction. Less than three months after opening, Disney began selling "Value Books", each of which contained several of each coupon labeled "A" through "C", to supplement the pay-per-ride system. Attractions were then designated as "A", "B", or "C" attractions, and visitors needed to either purchase a specified coupon from a nearby booth or present the discount coupon book with the correct coupon attached. As determined by Disney, "A" attractions were the smallest or least popular, "B" attractions were more popular and/or more advanced, and "C" attractions were the most popular and/or most advanced. In 1956, Disney introduced the "D" designation for the most popular attractions and upgraded several former "C" attractions including Jungle Cruise to "D".

In June 1959, amid the completion of Disneyland's first major expansion, Disney introduced the "E" designation for the park's most popular attractions and made the new Submarine Voyage, Matterhorn Bobsleds, and Disneyland–Alweg Monorail "E" coupon attractions. Additionally, the Santa Fe & Disneyland Railroad, Rocket to the Moon, Rainbow Ridge Pack Mules, Rainbow Mountain Stage Coaches, Mark Twain Riverboat, Sailing Ship Columbia, Rafts to Tom Sawyer Island, and Jungle Cruise—all previously "D" rides—were upgraded to "E". "E" remained the highest attraction/coupon designation for over 20 years. Several "E" attractions were added throughout the 1960s and 1970s. In 1971, the coupon system was duplicated at the Magic Kingdom when it opened.

The coupons had a face value for use on rides, with an "A" ticket worth $0.10, "B" $0.15, "C" $0.25, "D" $0.50, and "E", $0.85. This meant one could ride any ride if the ticket or a combination of tickets met or exceeded the value of that ride, so one could overpay an "A" ticket ride with a "B" ticket or higher, or present an "A", "C", and "D" ticket together instead of an "E" ticket.

The coupon system was gradually phased out with the introduction of "passports" (unlimited use tickets) beginning in the late 1970s. This was largely due to competition from Six Flags Magic Mountain, which, when it opened in 1971, allowed its visitors unlimited use of its attractions after paying the admission fee. By June 1982, coupons vanished entirely and were replaced by the present-day system where main gate admission entitles visitors to all rides and attractions, excluding coin-operated arcades.

== Modern usage ==
From 1997 to 2004, Walt Disney World's Magic Kingdom hosted "hard ticket" special events (Note: The general public and annual pass holders must purchase additional tickets to attend "Specially Ticketed Events".) called E-Ride Nights, where a limited number of resort room guests (usually 5,000) were allowed to purchase special tickets that allowed them to stay in the park and ride some of the rides (typically those that had been, or would have been, E-ticket rides) for an extra three hours after the park had closed to other guests.

The term "E ticket" was for some time used to describe cutting-edge or top-tier amusement park attractions, especially Disney attractions of this caliber, and "E-ticket ride" is a colloquial term for an exhilarating experience. For example, a ride in the back of a fighter jet is an E-ticket ride. When Sally Ride flew on Space Shuttle Challenger in 1983, she said to the Mission Control Center, "Have you ever been to Disneyland? ... Well, this is definitely an E ticket." However, the term has become less common over the years since Disney stopped using lettered tickets for its rides.

The Vandals' song "Pirate's Life" from their 1982 debut EP Peace thru Vandalism tells the story of the narrator riding Pirates of the Caribbean under the influence of LSD, exclaiming the line, "You get something really wicked, when you spend an E-ticket!" In her 1984 song, "The Homecoming Queen's Got a Gun", singer-songwriter Julie Brown compares the titular homecoming queen to Disneyland's [fictional] Cinderella ride, describing both as "definitely an E ticket". In his 1993 song "Jurassic Park", "Weird Al" Yankovic complains, "well, this sure ain't no E-ticket".

In the 1984 film Night of the Comet during the department store hostage scene, Willy, the gang's leader, refers to the E ticket as he has the gun against Samantha's head.
