= Submarine Voyage =

Former attraction at Disneyland

Coordinates: 33.8129°N 117.9172°W

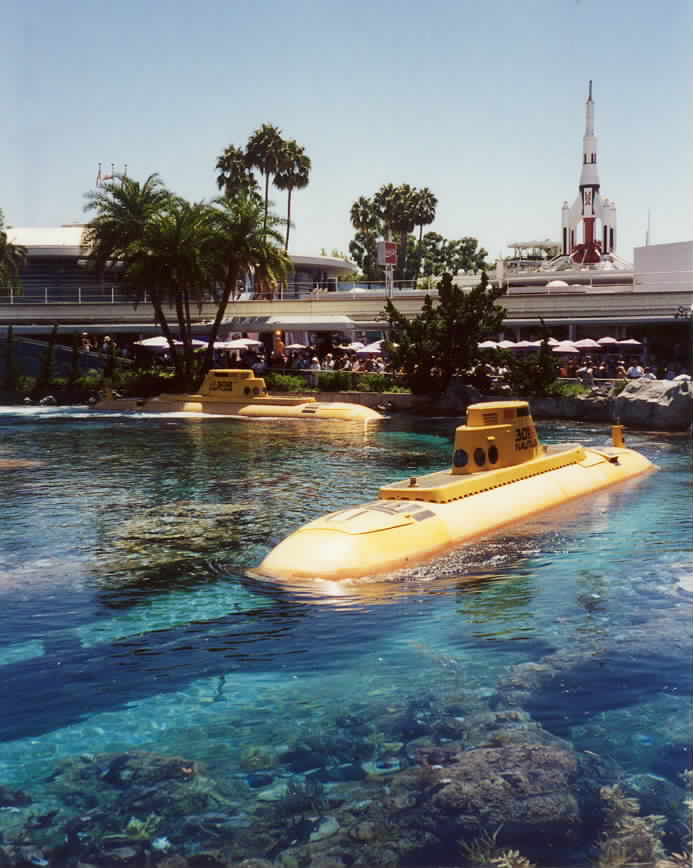
- Submarine Voyage in 1995

Disneyland
- Area: Tomorrowland
- Status: Removed
- Opening date: June 14, 1959
- Closing date: September 8, 1998
- Replaced: Phantom Boats (1956–1959)
- Replaced by: Finding Nemo Submarine Voyage

Ride statistics
- Attraction type: Submarine ride
- Designer: WED Enterprises
- Theme: Undersea voyage
- Length: 1,365 ft (416 m)
- Vehicle type: Submarines
- Riders per vehicle: 38
- Duration: 8 minutes
- Propulsion method: Diesel-Electric
- Vehicle length: 52 ft (16 m)
- Cost Per Sub: Approx. $80,000
- Total Water: 9,000,000 US gallons (34,000 m^{3}) (Including Lagoon & Caverns)

The Submarine Voyage was an attraction at Disneyland in Anaheim, California. The attraction featured vehicles designed to resemble submarines. It first opened on June 14, 1959, as one of the first rides to require an E ticket. It was part of a major expansion of Tomorrowland, which included the Matterhorn Bobsleds roller coaster, an expanded version of Autopia, the Disneyland Monorail, and the Motor Boat Cruise.

The Submarine Voyage closed on September 8, 1998. At that time, it was reported that the attraction would reopen with a new theme by 2003, but that did not occur. The attraction ultimately reopened in June 2007 themed to Pixar's 2003 film Finding Nemo, and now operates as Finding Nemo Submarine Voyage.

== Attraction ==
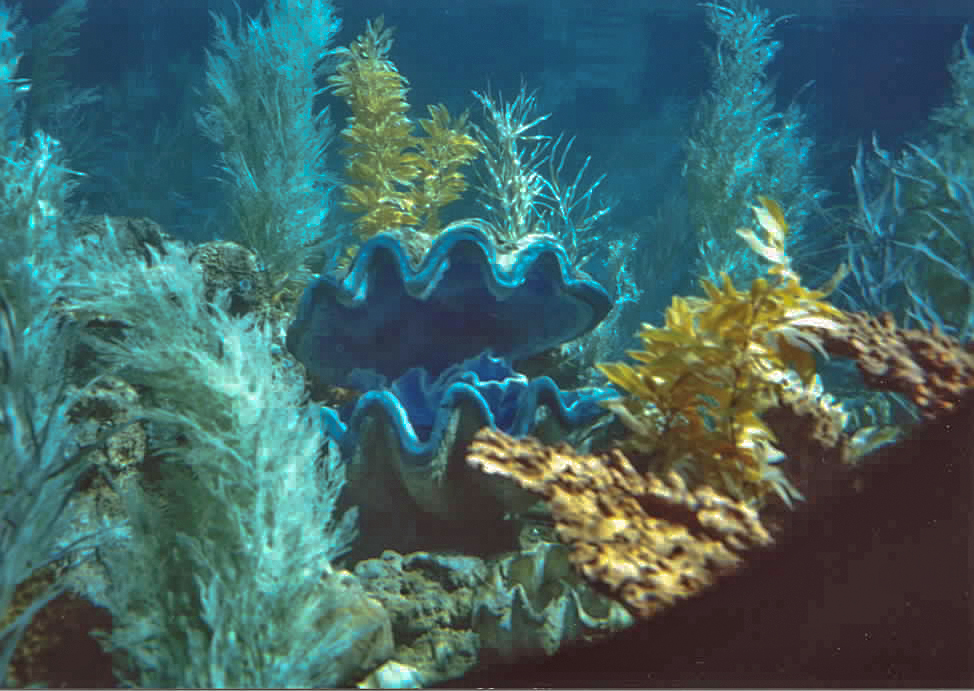
A giant clam seen through a submarine porthole.

As initially conceived, the Submarine Voyage was to feature real fish and other sea creatures, though the idea proved to be unfeasible. A major portion of the ride simulated the voyage under the Arctic Ocean's polar ice cap undertaken by the nuclear submarine USS Nautilus on August 3, 1958.

=== Ride ===
The submarines followed a 1,365 ft (416 m) long guide rail through the following sections of the ride:

==== Getting under way ====
As the guest enters the submarine, taped narrations play that help create an illusion that the guest is actually getting ready to submerge in a submarine. The Captain gives the order to clear the bridge and secure hatches and vents. When the last guest boards, the dock operators raise the ramps and secure the hatches. As the submarine leaves the dock, the Captain gives the "all ahead one-third" order.

==== Diving and lagoon ====
As the submarine leaves the dock, it dives below the surface to view the undersea life of a tropical lagoon. The diving effect is accomplished by a dense curtain of small bubbles rushing towards the surface on a slight angle, giving the feeling that the submarine is moving forward and down. Guests can view seaweed, coral reefs, rock formations, and mysterious caves.

Some of the specific oceanic creatures on the voyage were:

- common octopus battling a shark
- sea turtle
- ocean sunfish
- barracuda
- battling lobsters
- battling crabs
- grouper
- giant clam
- moray eel

==== Graveyard of Lost Ships ====
After a quiet cruise through the lagoon, the navigation room receives word of a surface storm ahead. The submarine begins a dive, which takes it to 250 feet, a point safely below the violence of the turbulent hurricane. The submarine passes through the wreckage of other ships that have not fared so well. Ships from many periods of history lie barnacle-covered and decayed, including Greek, Roman, and Viking ships. Great White Sharks guard a treasure chest in the hold of a Venetian galley. Nearby, deep-sea divers work to carry other treasures to the surface.

==== North Pole ====
Sonar detects a polar ice cap ahead, and the diving officer takes the ship deeper in order to clear the ice. The submarine travels directly beneath the North Pole. This is a recreation of the historic voyage of USS Nautilus when it left Hawaii on July 22, 1958, and set its course for the North Pole.

==== The Bottom of the Sea ====
After passing beyond the polar region, the submarine journeys to deeper waters where sunlight has never penetrated. Strange creatures can be sighted, including a giant squid and creatures that can change color at will.

==== Mermaids ====
Mermaids can now be seen. The Captain does not believe it at first and asks for the air pressure to be checked, but it is in fine working condition. The Captain thinks the mermaids are a hallucination and asks if it is possible that they are real, but then dismisses it.

==== Lost Continent of Atlantis ====
The submarine continues and enters an area which the Captain believed to be the lost continent of Atlantis. There is some volcanic activity in this area, but the submarine travels safely between teetering columns.

==== Sea Serpent ====
As the submarine safely leaves the area of volcanic disturbance, a sea serpent is sighted. The Captain calls the crew to man their battle stations and stand by for action. He then becomes convinced that he has been at sea too long when the comical cross-eyed sea serpent appears.

==== Return to the surface ====
As the submarine reaches the surface, preparations are made for entering port. When all lines are secured, the "All ashore" is given and guests depart the submarine.

=== Vehicles ===
The hulls (eight in all) for "one of the world's largest peacetime submarine fleets" cost $80,000 each to build. They were fabricated at Todd Shipyards in San Pedro, California, then transported to the "Disneyland Naval Yard" in Anaheim for outfitting under the direction of retired Admiral Joe Fowler. Technical data and advice regarding the design were provided by General Dynamics' Electric Boat Division, builder of the U.S. Navy's nuclear-powered submarines, and the first company in the world to manufacture submarines.

The windows in the submarines, or portholes, were first cut out by hand—this cutout was then used to carve out the other windows on the submarine. The vessels were painted in military gray livery with black lower hulls until 1986, when the attraction was updated. The exterior color of the submarines was changed to yellow with white around the 'periscope towers' along with pastel blue or pastel pink trim on the hatch doors, periscope tower and lower hull.

The newly painted subs' paint started peeling almost immediately and had to be repainted again within a few months. This time they were painted mustard yellow along with orange and black trim. The design remained the same until the attraction closed in 1998. The yellow color made the submarines look like research submarines instead of the previous militarian gray and black subs. The reason research subs are typically painted yellow is that yellow is one of the last colors to be visible at great depths.

The vessels are not actual submarines as they do not submerge, but are boats. The 38-passenger, now 40-passenger, seating area was positioned below the water level. Portholes along the sides allowed guests to view the many underwater sights. Above the seating area was the conning tower, where the operator stood and controlled the sub's speed. Speed was controlled by a single electric lever that could be used to increase or decrease speed by moving the lever up or down. There was a "deadman's switch" that had to be depressed at all times with a foot, or the speed lever would not function.

Originally, there was a seat so the operator could sit down during the voyage. This seat was removed because operators would often fail to pay attention and cause a collision with other boats, so the seat was removed, which required the operator to stand. The "diving" effect was made by bubble screens and using the waterfalls at the entrance to the caves that led the submarines into the cleverly disguised show building. The bubble jets can be seen from outside if one were to look just past the loading dock. In case of a broken porthole, a cushion in the conning tower could be used to plug the hole until the repair crew arrived. Atop of the show building are the majority of the Autopia tracks, some monorail tracks, trees and the currently derelict Rocket Rods/PeopleMover track.

During the attraction's opening in June 1959, the Disneyland fleet was christened by Mrs. Mildred Nelson, a former WAVE and wife of Chief Machinist Mate Stuart N. M. Nelson of USS Nautilus.

==== Original nuclear submarine names (1959–1986) ====
- Nautilus (D-301)
- Seawolf (D-302)
- Skate (D-303)
- Skipjack (D-304)
- Triton (D-305)
- George Washington (D-306)
- Patrick Henry (D-307)
- Ethan Allen (D-308)

==== Exploration submarine names (1987–1998) ====
- Nautilus (301)
- Neptune (302)
- Sea Star (303)
- Explorer (304)
- Seeker (305)
- Argonaut (306)
- Triton (307)
- Sea Wolf (308)

=== Lagoon ===
The lagoon that houses the ride requires nine million US gallons (34,000 m^{3}) of water to fill. It is difficult to maintain, since divers had to be sent underwater every night to clean up debris and fix the audio-animatronics whenever they broke down.

During the summers of 1959–1967, female cast members dressed in mermaid costumes could be seen sun-bathing themselves and performing synchronized swimming and underwater stunts for four hours each day. Disney ended this feature in 1967 and replaced them with animatronic creations after several mermaid performers reported health concerns, related to the submarines' diesel exhaust fumes and the highly chlorinated water. In addition, tourists taking pictures of them would block the thoroughfare between the Matterhorn and the submarine lagoon. The mermaids received $1.65 an hour, which in 2018 dollars would be $13.15 an hour.

In 2005, an auction took place at the Disneyland Resort, where several pieces of the original attraction's scenery were sold, such as the shark fighting with the octopus on a rock. They were removed from the lagoon prior to the auction so new scenery for the updated Finding Nemo Submarine Voyage could be built into the lagoon.

=== Queue ===
In and around 1982, the waiting line for the attraction had various spiels combined with sea chanties as mood music. Some of these sea chanties were:

- "The Sailor's Hornpipe" (traditional, of Popeye cartoon fame, or of Mike Oldfield's album Tubular Bells fame)
- "A Whale of a Tale" (from the Disney film 20,000 Leagues Under the Sea)
- "What Shall We Do With the Drunken Sailor?" (traditional, played on harmonica in the spiel)

== Closure and reopening ==
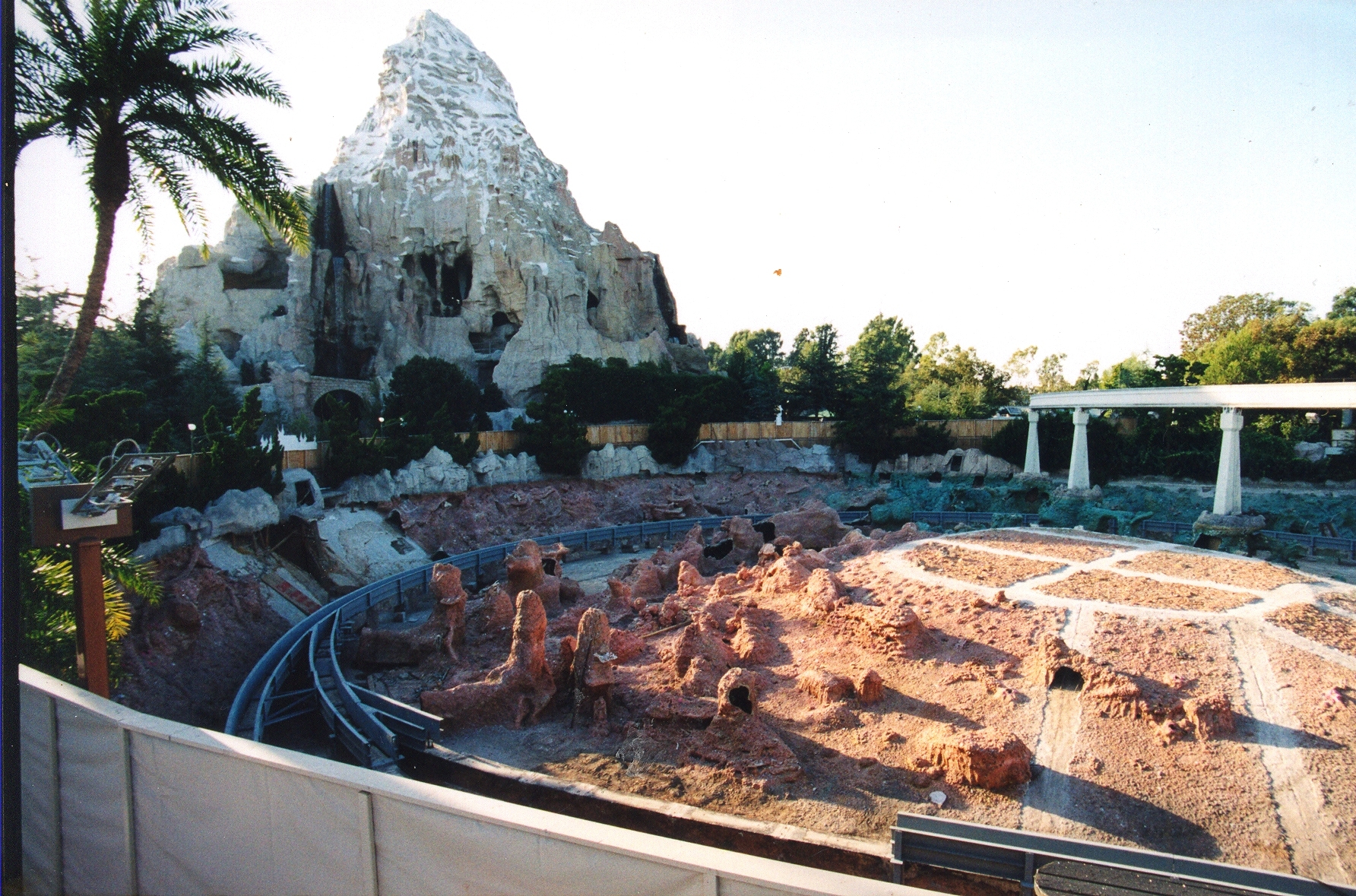
The Submarine lagoon drained of water while Finding Nemo Submarine Voyage was under construction. Matterhorn Bobsleds can be seen in the background. Photo by Mike Johansen.

In April 1998, when the Orange County Register interviewed then-Disneyland president Paul Pressler regarding the attraction's fate after rumors circulated about the attraction's closure, Pressler stated: "We know in the future we need to do something in that location, but we have not made a decision on the subs, and we won't make a decision until we know what we want to do in the future there."

On July 29, 1998, Disneyland announced the Submarine Voyage's closure. The attraction closed on September 8, because park executives at that time considered it too costly to operate in relation to its capacity. The lagoon remained, filled with water for seven years, serving as scenery. Many rumors went around over the years, saying that a proposed attraction based on Disney Animation's 2001 film Atlantis: The Lost Empire was going to replace Submarine Voyage in 2003. After the film underperformed at the box office, this was scrapped.

In 2005, the lagoon was drained and construction began on a new attraction: Finding Nemo Submarine Voyage, which opened on June 11, 2007, which is based on Pixar's Finding Nemo.

== Similar attractions ==
The successor of this attraction was the Jules Verne themed 20,000 Leagues Under the Sea: Submarine Voyage at Walt Disney World's Magic Kingdom. The attraction was given a Nautilus theme and a narration by Peter Renaday, whose voice was similar to that of actor James Mason, who portrayed Captain Nemo in the 1954 Disney film. The attraction was closed in 1994 for a "rehabilitation" period, but never reopened.

Executive leadership felt that continual maintenance of the attraction was simply too costly. The space was cleared of ride elements, and in 2004, ten years after its closure, the water was drained. A small portion of the area was remade into a playground called Pooh's Playful Spot until April, 2010. The remaining open field backstage was ultimately paved over in 2010 to create new space for Fantasyland.

A similar voyage attraction now exists at the Tokyo DisneySea in Japan, using the same Nautilus theme from Florida. Instead of boats in water, it is a dark ride through a show building, in enclosed suspended cars ("mini-subs"). There was a walk-through of the Nautilus sets from the 1954 film at Disneyland from 1955 until 1966, when they were destroyed. An updated version of the walk-through was built in 1994 in Discoveryland in Disneyland Paris, known as Les Mystères du Nautilus, along with the construction of Space Mountain. The attraction involves an accurate recreation of the Nautilus interiors, and a mock attack from a large animatronic giant squid.

Legoland Windsor has a similar ride themed around Lego's Atlantis theme, named Atlantis Submarine Voyage.

The West Edmonton Mall in Edmonton, Alberta used to have an indoor submarine that operated into 2005, and removed in 2012. The submarines were the world's first recreational submarines, and were fully deep-sea tested before delivery.

== In popular culture ==
- When Soviet Premier Nikita Khrushchev was denied permission to go to Disneyland in 1959, Walt Disney was reportedly disappointed, as he wanted to introduce Khrushchev to his Disneyland submarine fleet.
- In the Sing Along Songs film Disneyland Fun (1990), during "Zip-a-Dee-Doo-Dah", the "Argonaut" was briefly seen.
- In Epic Mickey, a mission requires Mickey Mouse to repair Nautilus, renamed the "Noutilus" in the game, possibly referencing Oswald's personifying everything in his name and image, and then captain it.

== See also ==
- List of former Disneyland attractions
- 20,000 Leagues Under the Sea: Submarine Voyage
- Finding Nemo Submarine Voyage
- The Seas with Nemo & Friends
