= Ārohirohi =

Goddess in Māori mythology

In Māori mythology, Ārohirohi is the goddess of mirages and shimmering heat, and is the wife of Tama-nui-te-rā (the Sun).

She created Mārikoriko (Twilight), the first woman, from a mirage and then asked Paoro (Echo) to give her a voice.
