= Hine-kau-ataata =

Character in Māori mythology

In the Māori mythology of the Ngāti Hau tribe, Hine-kau-ataata, translated as "maid swimming in the shadow," is the daughter of Tiki (Man) and Mārikoriko (Twilight). When she is born, the first clouds appear in the sky.
