= Mārikoriko =

First woman in Māori mythology

In a Māori legend attributed by ethnographer John White to the Ngāti Hau iwi (tribe), Mārikoriko (Twilight) is the first woman, created by Ārohirohi (Shimmering heat) from the heat of the sun and the echoing cliff. She married Tiki, the first man, and gave birth to Hine-kau-ataata (woman floating in shadows).
