= Tiki =

First man in Māori mythology

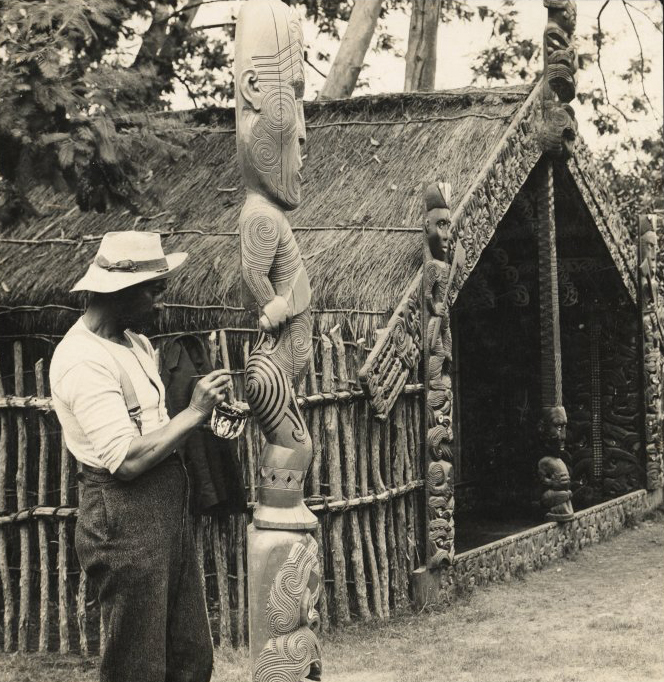
A Māori man painting a tattoo on a carved wooden tiki at Whakarewarewa model village, New Zealand, c. 1905

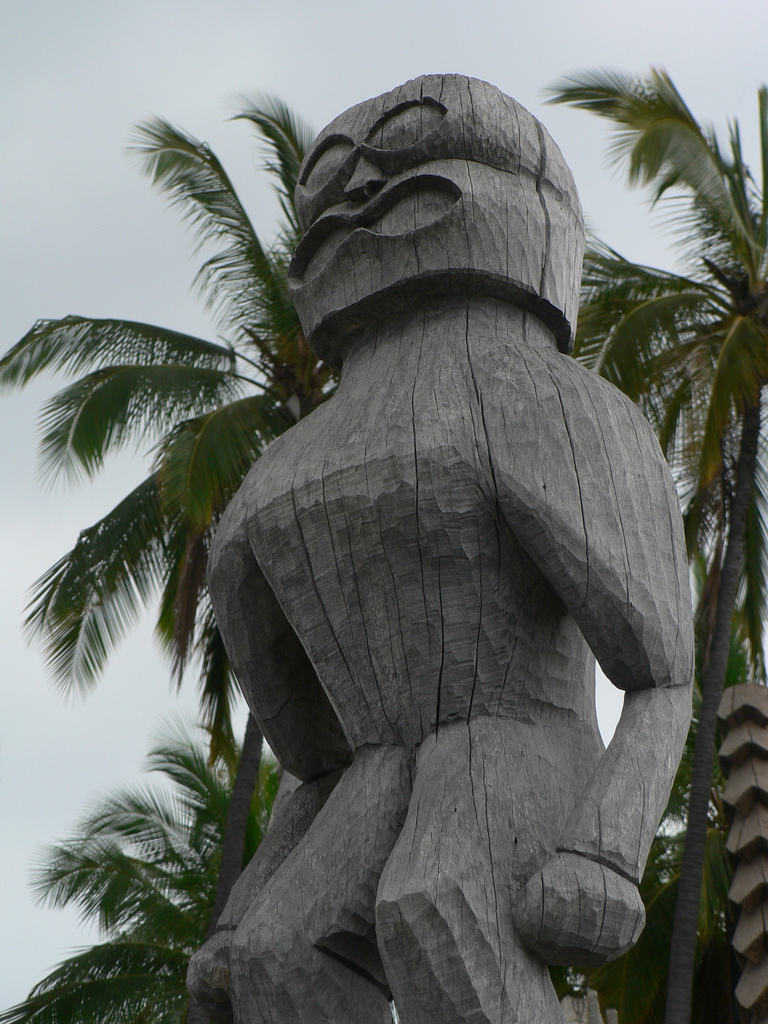
Hawaiian kiʻi at Puʻuhonua o Hōnaunau National Historical Park

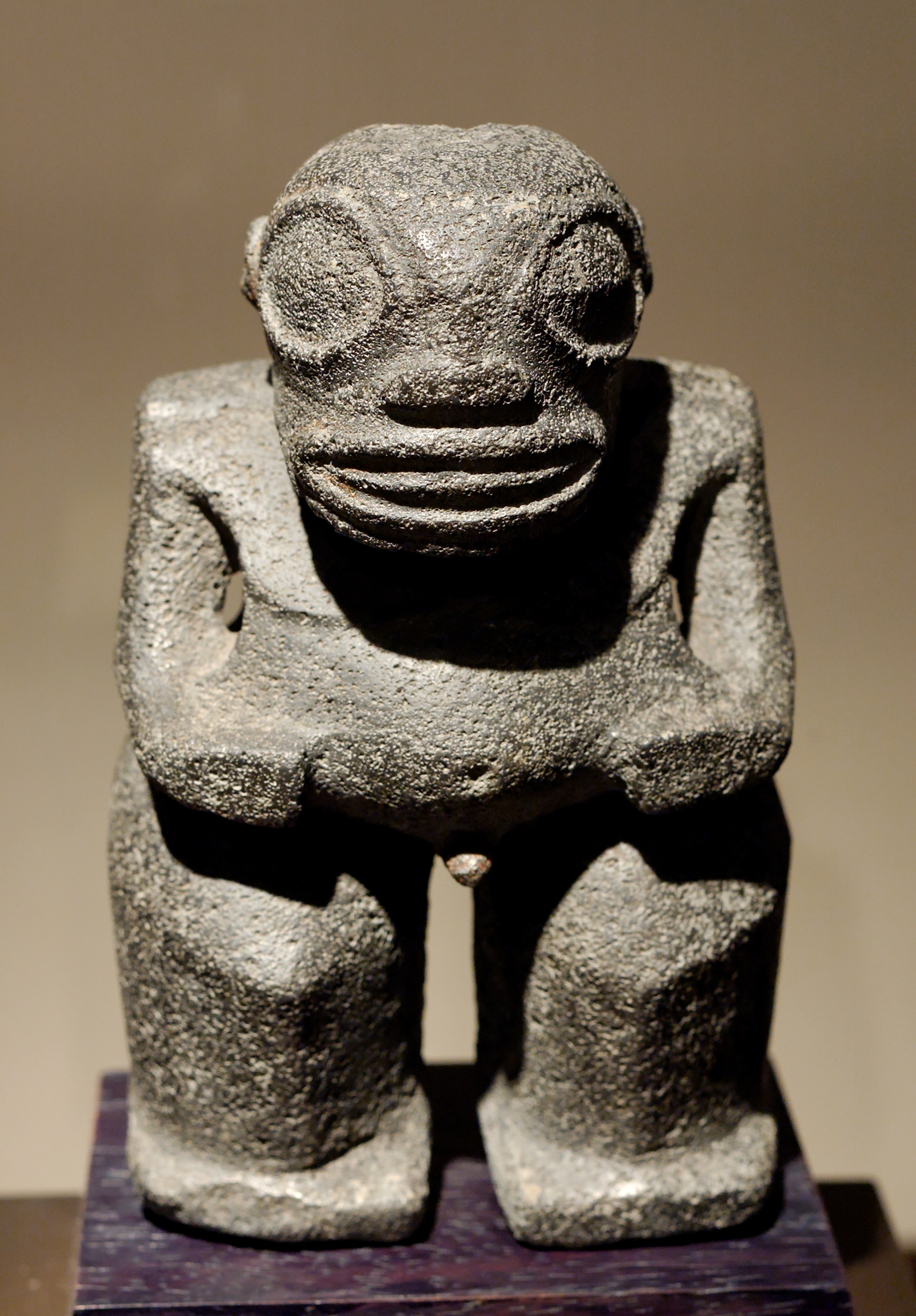
Tiki statuette from the Marquesas

In Māori mythology, Tiki is the first man created by either Tūmatauenga or Tāne. He found the first woman, Marikoriko, in a pond; she seduced him, and he became the father of Hine-kau-ataata. By extension, a tiki is a large or small wooden, pounamu or other stone carving in humanoid form, although this is a somewhat archaic usage in the Māori language, where a tiki is usually a hei-tiki, a pendant worn around the neck. Hei-tiki are often considered taonga, especially if they are older and have been passed down throughout multiple generations. Carvings similar to tiki and coming to represent deified ancestors are found in most Polynesian cultures. They often serve to mark the boundaries of sacred or significant sites. The word has cognates in other Polynesian languages, such as tiʻi in Tahitian and kiʻi in Hawaiian. In the Western world, Tiki culture, a movement inspired by various Pacific cultures, has become popular in the 20th and 21st centuries.

== Religion ==
In traditions from the West Coast of the South Island of New Zealand, the first human is a woman created by Tāne, god of forests and of birds. Usually her name is Hine-ahu-one. In other legends, Tāne makes the first man, Tiki, and then makes a wife for him. In some West Coast versions, Tiki himself, as a son of Rangi and Papa, creates the first human by mixing his own blood with clay, and Tāne then makes the first woman. Sometimes Tūmatauenga, the war god, creates Tiki. (Note: Tūmatauenga, god of war, represents man, as does Tāne, whose name means 'man'.) In another story, the first woman is Mārikoriko. Tiki marries her, and their daughter is Hine-kau-ataata. (Note: John White attributes this version to Ngāti Hau.) In some traditions, Tiki is the penis of Tāne. In fact, Tiki is strongly associated with the origin of the reproductive act. (Note: According to Reed, "it is certain that Tiki ... has a definite phallic significance." However Te Rangi Hiroa (Sir Peter Buck) pointed out that such references were only found in one late and controversial source.)

In one story of Tiki among the many variants, Tiki was lonely and craved company. One day, seeing his reflection in a pool, he thought he had found a companion, and dived into the pool to seize it. The image shattered, and Tiki was disappointed. He fell asleep, and when he awoke, he saw the reflection again. He covered the pool with earth, and it gave birth to a woman. Tiki lived with her in serenity until one day the woman was excited by an eel. Her excitement passed to Tiki, and the first reproductive act resulted.

=== Names and epithets ===
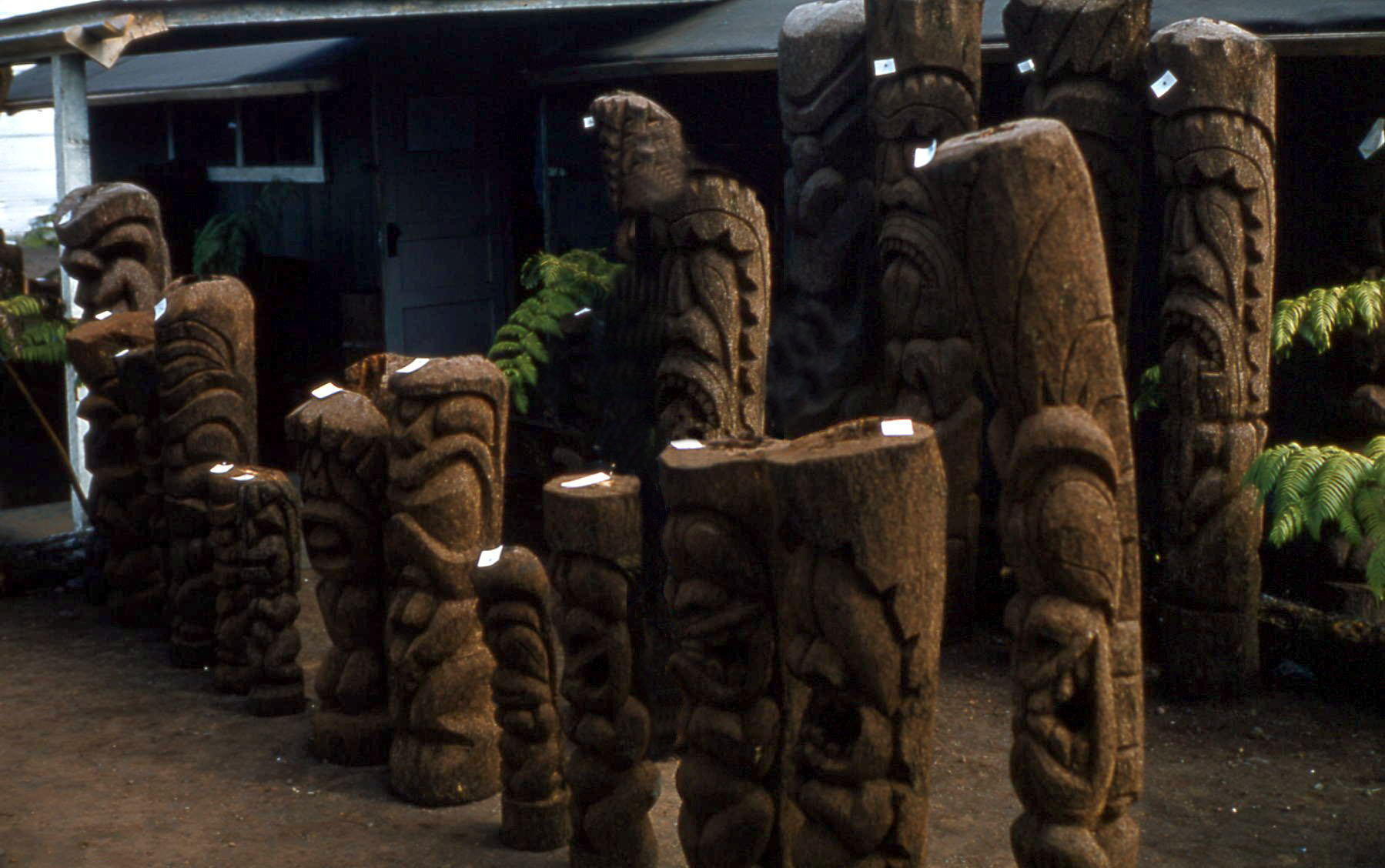
Tiki statue shop, Hawaii, c. 1959

John White names several Tiki or perhaps manifestations of Tiki in Māori tradition:

- Tiki-tohua, the progenitor of birds (Note: In this story, Tiki-tohua was an egg produced by Hine-ahu-one, a woman made by Tāne to be his wife. This egg gave rise to all the birds.)
- Tiki-kapakapa, the progenitor of fish and of a bird, the tūī (Note: Tiki-kapakapa (born after Tiki-tohua) was a girl who later took the name Hine-a-tauira. She and Tāne had a daughter named Hine-titamauri who was given to Tiki as his wife.)
- Tiki-auaha, the progenitor of humanity
- Tiki-whakaeaea, the progenitor of the kūmara.

=== Elsewhere in Polynesia ===
The word appears as tiki in New Zealand Māori, Cook Islands Māori, Tuamotuan, and Marquesan; as tiʻi in Tahitian, and as kiʻi in Hawaiian. The word has not been recorded from the languages of Western Polynesia or in the Rapa Nui language.

- In Hawaiian traditions the first man was Kumuhonua. He was made by Kāne, or by Kāne, Kū, and Lono. His body was made by mixing red earth with saliva. He was made in the shape of Kāne, who carried the earth from which the man was made from the four corners of the world. A woman was made from one of his ribs. Kanaloa was watching when Kāne made the first man, and he too made a man, but could not bring him to life. Kanaloa then said to Kāne, "I will take your man, and he will die." And so death came upon humankind.
- In Tahiti, Tiʻi was the first man, and was made from red earth. The first woman was Ivi, who was made from one of the bones (ivi) of Tiʻi.
- In the Marquesas Islands, there are various accounts. In one legend Atea and his wife created people. In another tradition Atanua and her father Atea brought forth humans.
- In the Cook Islands, traditions also vary. At Rarotonga, Tiki is the guardian of the entrance to Avaiki, the underworld. Offerings were made to him as gifts for the departing soul of someone who is dying. At Mangaia, Tiki is a woman, the sister of Veetini, the first person to die a natural death. The entrance to Avaiki (the underworld) is called 'the chasm of Tiki'.

== See also ==
- Hei-tiki, Māori neck pendants, often called tiki
- Moai, a monolithic human figure on Easter Island, sometimes erroneously called tiki
- Tiki culture, a 20th-century decorative style used in Polynesian-themed restaurants
- Taotao, similar carvings of ancestral and nature spirits in the Philippine islands
- Totem pole, artworks similar in shape and purpose from Cascadian cultures
- Chemamüll, Mapuche statues
- Enchanted Tiki Room, a Disney attraction
