= Matterhorn Bobsleds =

Roller coasters at Disneyland

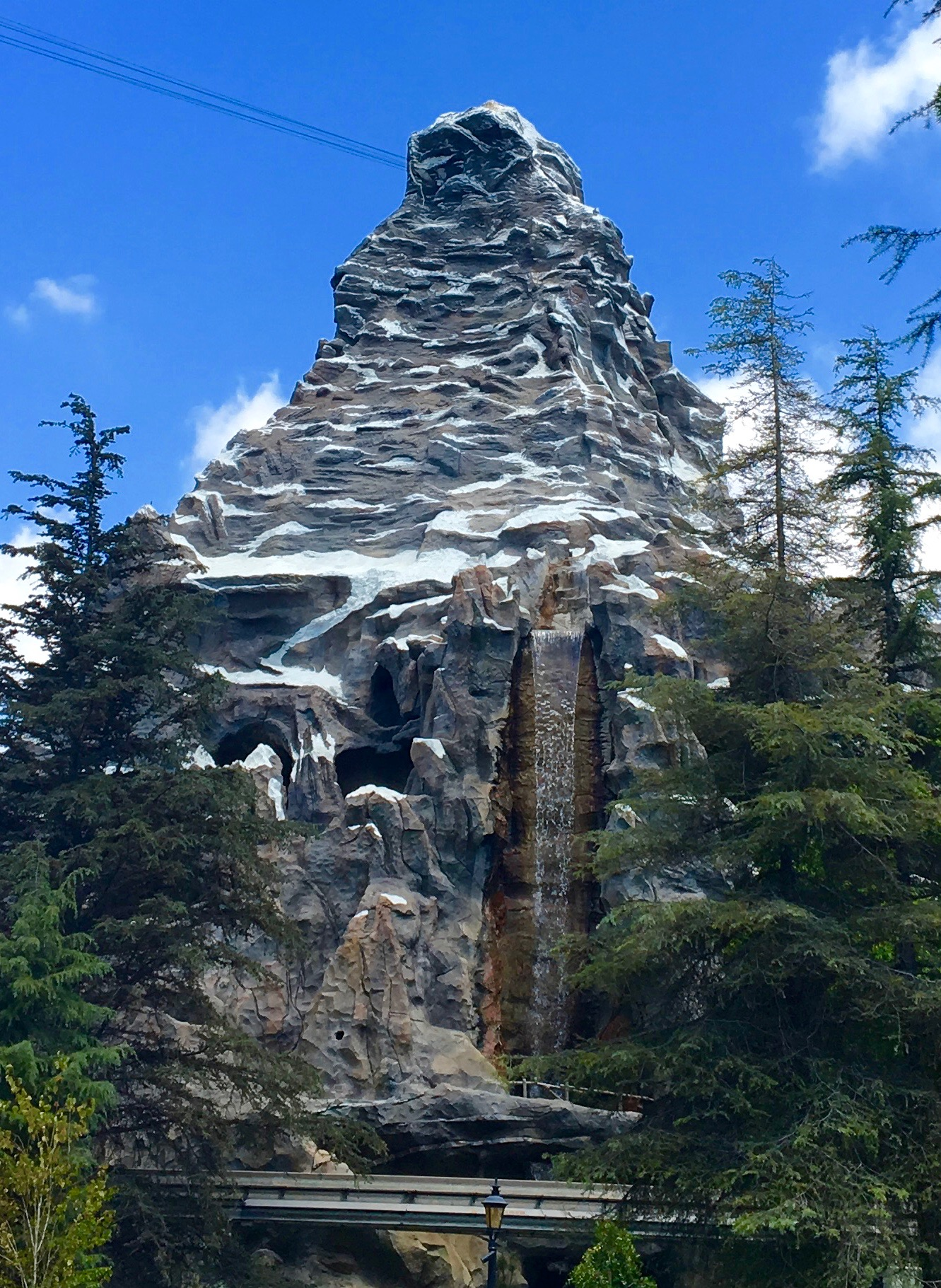
- The Matterhorn in 2016

Disneyland
- Park section: Fantasyland
- Coordinates: 33.813184°N 117.917856°W
- Status: Operating
- Opening date: June 14, 1959

General statistics
- Type: Steel
- Manufacturer: Arrow Development
- Designer: WED Enterprises
- Model: Special Coaster Systems
- Track layout: Dual-tracked
- Lift/launch system: Chain lift hill
	Tomorrowland Track	Fantasyland Track
Height	80 ft (24.4 m)	80 ft (24.4 m)
Length	2,037 ft (620.9 m)	2,134 ft (650.4 m)
Speed	27 mph (43.5 km/h)	27 mph (43.5 km/h)
Inversions	0	0
Duration	2:07	2:26
- Restraint Style: Seat belt
- Height restriction: 42 in (107 cm)
- Trains: 20 trains with 2 cars. Riders are arranged 1 across in 3 rows for a total of 6 riders per train.
- Theme: Swiss mountain
- Lightning Lane Available
- Single rider line available
- Must transfer from wheelchair
- Matterhorn Bobsleds at RCDB; Pictures of Matterhorn Bobsleds at RCDB

Matterhorn Bobsleds is an attraction that consists of a pair of intertwined steel roller coasters running through a fabricated mountain. It is located at Disneyland in Anaheim, California and is modeled after the Matterhorn, a mountain in the Alps on the border between Switzerland and Italy. It is the first known permanently-installed tubular steel track roller coaster, though coasters with tubular steel tracks had toured European fairs as early as 1956. Located on the border between Tomorrowland and Fantasyland, it employs forced perspective to seem larger than its actual size.

== History ==
=== 1956–1970 ===
During the construction of the park, dirt from the excavation of Sleeping Beauty Castle's moat was piled in an area between Fantasyland and Tomorrowland. When the park opened, the area, dubbed Holiday Hill (and later Lookout Mountain), was improved with benches and pathways to encourage its use as a picnic area. After the opening of the Disneyland Skyway in 1956, Walt Disney conceived the idea of a toboggan ride on the mountain with real snow, but Disneyland construction chief Joe Fowler strongly objected, citing complex logistical issues and other pressing needs in the amusement park. In this period, the hill began to be known as Snow Hill. By now, instead of being a place for picnicking, the hill had come to be used primarily as a nighttime lovers' lane, much to Disney's dismay. New wild mouse-style roller coasters got the attention of Disneyland executives, who began to consider applying this emerging technology to the creation of a toboggan-themed coaster ride on an artificial mountain at the site.

The Matterhorn Bobsleds have a striking resemblance to "one of the oldest rollercoasters in the world, Rutschebanen, also known as Bjergbanen (the Mountain Coaster, which opened in 1914 and still operates with a rider on each train braking the car on each hill)." Similar to Rutschebanen (at the Tivoli in Copenhagen, Denmark), which predated it by nearly half a century, the top of the Matterhorn Bobsleds ride is also an icy scene, and the snowbirds and the interior featuring the Abominable Snowman are also quite similar in design.

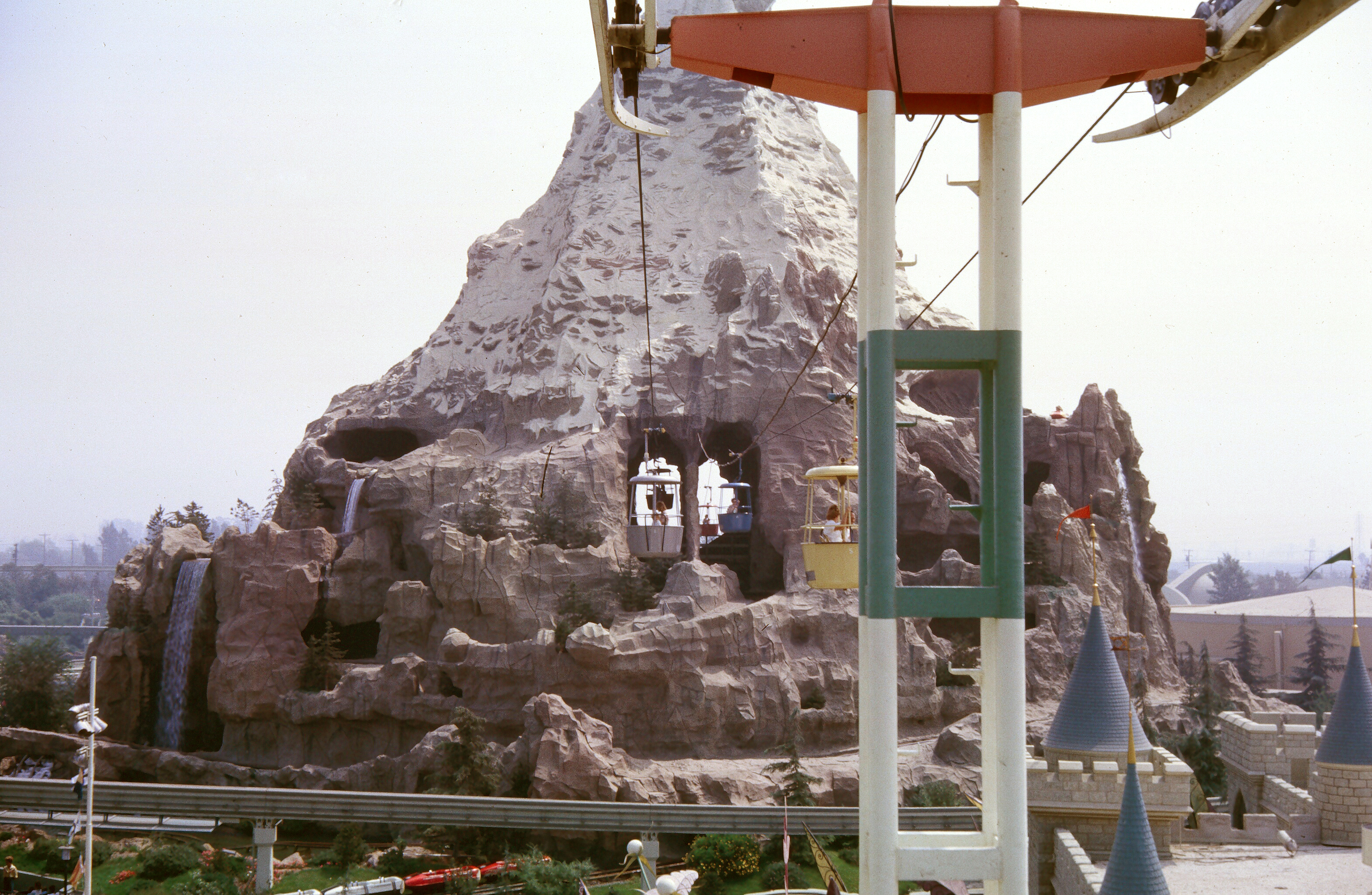
1962 from Fantasyland side. The Matterhorn hid the central Skyway cable pylon. Waterfalls are visible on the left and right sides.

The structure was also intended to act as a decorative overlay to camouflage the central pylon of the Skyway. Use of the Matterhorn, both in style and name, grew from Walt Disney's extended vacation in Switzerland while filming Third Man on the Mountain. In a moment of inspiration, impressed by the beauty of the real Matterhorn, Disney grabbed a postcard of the mountain from a souvenir stand and sent it back to Imagineer (architect) Vic Greene with the message, "Vic. Build This. Walt." This resulted in the merger of the toboggan-ride concept with the idea for a bobsled coaster ride that would run around and through the structure. The peak was first shown in a conceptual drawing that was once on display at the Disney Gallery.

Imagineer Bob Gurr was responsible for designing the track plan and has said that it was the hardest project that he has ever worked on. He began working on the attraction in mid-1958 after finishing preliminary work on the Submarine Voyage.

American Bridge Company was responsible for constructing the steel structure inside the Matterhorn. In 1936, they built the Bay Bridge that connects Oakland to San Francisco in California.

The view to the northwest shows a corner of the now-defunct Junior Autopia, which would be replaced by both the Matterhorn and the Submarine Voyage attraction the following year. The Matterhorn opened on June 14, 1959, one of three major new Tomorrowland attractions to open that year. Built by coaster builder Arrow Development and WED Imagineering, it was the world's first tubular steel roller coaster. It consisted of a wood and steel infrastructure surrounded by man-made rock. Starting with the 1961 holiday season, a revolving star stood atop it.

Trees could be seen on its sides; by making the trees at higher altitudes smaller, the Imagineers used forced perspective to augment the mountain's height. Waterfalls cascaded down its sides and frequently sprayed riders. Inside was a large, open space through which the bobsleds traveled. The peak had numerous holes in its exterior through which the bobsleds exited and re-entered, though the space within was not elaborately themed, with the infrastructure only minimally disguised as rock. The Skyway passed through the center of the mountain via a pair of openings on the Fantasyland and Tomorrowland sides. Skyway riders could see down into the Matterhorn's interior as they glided through.

In May 1964, 15-year-old Mark Maples of Long Beach, CA was killed on the ride when he tried to stand up while the ride was in progress. He was thrown from the sled onto the track below, fracturing his skull and ribs and causing internal injuries, which he died from three days later.

=== 1970s ===
In the early 1970s, the ride was officially made a part of Fantasyland, but this was merely a prelude to far more significant changes. In 1973, the revolving star at its top was removed, in part because of the 1973 oil crisis that had hit the US.

In 1978, the Matterhorn received a major refurbishment. Most notably, the hollow interior space was broken up into a number of small, icy caves and tunnels with far more convincing theming. A grotto filled with glimmering crystals was added near the top of the lift hill. Some holes in the mountain's skin were filled in as well, including the two large openings at the top of the lift hill that had allowed guests to briefly glimpse the entire southern part of the park. Recorded screams were placed at the top of the lift hill, along with mist machines creating a fog bank, and small holes to allow a brief view of the Skyway. Another major addition was an Abominable Snowman, whom the Imagineers dubbed "Harold". It appears as three similar Audio-Animatronic figures that roar at the bobsledders. The first is visible from both tracks, at the point where they diverge; the other two are visible only from their respective tracks. Each track also features a pair of red eyes that glow in the dark shortly after the lift hill while the Snowman's roar is heard. The roars can be heard from ground level as well, even over the recorded howling of the Alpine wind. The bobsleds themselves were also changed from the original flat, luge-like, multi-colored two-seaters to rounder, white cars decorated with orange and red stripes, and from single cars to two connected cars. The queue also was given changes mainly to the theming.

=== 1980s ===
On January 3, 1984, 48-year-old Dolly Regene Young was killed on the Matterhorn Bobsleds. She was thrown from her seat into the path of an oncoming bobsled, dying instantly, with her body becoming trapped under the second bobsled.

Her seatbelt was found to have been unbuckled, whether by accident or intention, and her death was ruled an accident by Anaheim detective David Tuttle. The ride opened for use the next day.

Young's husband filed a $5 million wrongful death lawsuit against Disney, which was settled out of court four years later.

The event gained additional notoriety thanks to Mark E. Smith, singer of The Fall. He was in the park on the day that Young was killed, and reported to his then-partner and bandmate Brix Smith that he had a premonition about the ride, which he called 'evil'. The event was immortalized in the song "Disney's Dream Debased".

=== 1990s–present ===
The Skyway continued to travel through the mountain, but its passageway was now enclosed in similarly themed ice caves. Following the closure of the Skyway in 1994, the cavernous holes through which the Skyway buckets had traveled were partially filled in. The holes in the Tomorrowland face remained mostly intact, and an abandoned crate labeled "Wells Expedition" was also added in the crystal scene as a tribute to Frank Wells, who had died earlier that year. (Wells had climbed six of the Seven Summits, with only Mount Everest remaining at the time of his death.) At the end of the lift chain, a projection of snowfall was added. With the exception of the filling of certain holes, the mountain's original external structure remained largely unchanged.

From 2003 to 2004 the ride received two small refurbishments. In 2003, the ride received an updated audio system, with the inclusion of new safety audio heard in the queue, and before the start of the ride along with the removal of the fog bank effect. In 2004, the queue received several changes including new loading gates, and changes to the actual queue line itself. Formerly two lines for each side, a single standby queue was installed that wrapped around the eastern part of the mountain. Wooden catwalk railings were also installed throughout the ride. Between 2010, and 2011 the ride was closed several times testing new bobsled car designs on the track. Two designs were tested including one with seatbelts in 2010, and one with lap bars in 2011. The vehicle seating arrangement was also modified to accommodate a single passenger in each seat rather than a lap-sitting arrangement of two riders. This resulted in three individual seats within each bobsled, with two cars linked for a total of six guests, similar to the configuration of the trains at Walt Disney World's version of Space Mountain. A planned refurbishment was supposed to take place in 2011 to add new bobsleds, special effects, and animatronics, but this planned refurbishment was cancelled in favor of revamping the entire mountain which would come the following year.

The Matterhorn was closed on January 9, 2012 for a six-month refurbishment. The mountain was renovated, receiving new paint externally and some repairs internally. The entire mountain exterior received a facelift. For only the second time—the first since the attraction was built—scaffolding was erected all the way from the base of the mountain to the top. The mountain had been repeatedly repainted through the years, resulting in a mostly white Matterhorn mountain with the appearance of snow; but the entire mountain was made bare again and carefully painted in a style more faithful to the look of the real Matterhorn, with more "snow" places on the northern side and less on the southern. For the first time since the Matterhorn's early days, the mountain's base was mostly snowless. In the past, the "snow" on the mountain's surface was merely white paint; for the refurbished ride, glass beads were mixed into the paint to reflect sunlight like real snow. Imagineer Jim Crouch was the rehab's art director. The ride reopened on June 15, 2012 with more additions. The "mountain climber" performers also returned after the refurbishment. The new bobsled were painted red, blue and green, and were based on the ones tested in 2010. As a result of the new trains, the height requirement was raised to 42 in (107 cm) from the original 35 in (89 cm). Other smaller changes were made, including the addition of wooden fences on the catwalks, improved LED lighting for the crystals, and a single-rider lane. The Abominable Snowman animatronics were given louder roars, but due to complaints they were toned down in October of that year.

On January 5, 2015, the attraction was closed for an extended refurbishment to prepare for the park's 60th anniversary. It reopened on May 22, 2015, with new special effects and updated animatronics. The new Abominable Snowman was designed similarly to the Expedition Everest Yeti, where the creature would look more realistically to an actual ape-like animal. The Snowman was given new vocal effects provided by Frank Welker. On the lift hills, the snowfall projection was replaced with the creature peering through a sheet of ice as the bobsleds ascend. The guest screams, and red eyes were removed being replaced by sound effects of the Snowman roars echoing in the tunnel. The crystal cavern was rethemed to a scene dubbed the "Hord" scene where the cavern has been filled with wreckage of older bobsleds, and former skyway buckets along with other mountain climbing equipment. New animatronics of the Snowman were also put in place, while improved sound effects help create the illusion that it is in pursuit as the train descends down the mountain. Disney's FastPass ride system was added to the attraction in April 2017.

The Matterhorn once again closed on July 30, 2018, to redesign the waiting queue, and reopened on November 16, 2018. The front of the old Matterhorn entrance was reworked to accommodate a larger queue area.

== Timeline ==
- 1956: Walt Disney conceives an idea for a toboggan-style roller coaster inside of a mountain.
- 1958: Construction begins.
- June 14, 1959: The Matterhorn Bobsleds open as the first tubular steel roller coaster in the world. It opens alongside the Disneyland Monorail and Submarine Voyage as part of an expansion to Tomorrowland.
- May 1964: A 15-year-old boy from Long Beach, California named Mark Maples is injured after he stands up in his bobsled car and falls out. It was reported that his restraint was undone by his ride companion. He dies as a result of his injuries three days after the incident; it is Disneyland's first fatality.
- Early 1970s: The Matterhorn Bobsleds is officially made part of Fantasyland.
- 1978: The Matterhorn receives a refurbishment by which Imagineers make smaller caves and tunnels with more theming. The ride also receives new trains and its most notable addition is the Abominable Snowman, which roars at riders twice. A grotto filled with crystals was added near the top of the lift hill as well.
- January 3, 1984: A 47-year-old woman from Fremont, California named Dolly Young was killed when she was thrown from a bobsled car and struck an oncoming bobsled, which decapitated her. An investigation reveals that her seatbelt was not buckled, though it does not indicate whether it was deliberately unfastened or malfunctioned. The English rock group The Fall addresses this incident in the song "Disney's Dream Debased" from their 1984 album The Wonderful and Frightening World Of.... Bandleader Mark E. Smith and his then-wife Brix Smith visited Disneyland on the day of the incident, and rode the Matterhorn shortly before Young's death.
- 1994: When the Skyway closes, the Matterhorn openings through which the Skyway had passed are partially filled in.
- January 9, 2012: The Matterhorn closes for a six-month refurbishment including a new outside fixture of the mountain and new trains with different restraints.
- June 15, 2012: The Matterhorn Bobsleds reopen.
- January 5, 2015: The Matterhorn closes for another refurbishment that includes a projected image of the Abominable Snowman at the top of the lift hill and an updated animatronic of it.
- May 22, 2015: The Matterhorn Bobsleds reopens as part of the Disneyland Resort Diamond Celebration, the 60th anniversary of the park's opening.
- April 28, 2017: FastPass is added to the Matterhorn Bobsleds.
- July 30, 2018: The Matterhorn Bobsleds are closed for another renovation.
- November 16, 2018: The Matterhorn Bobsleds reopen with a new waiting queue.

== The attraction ==
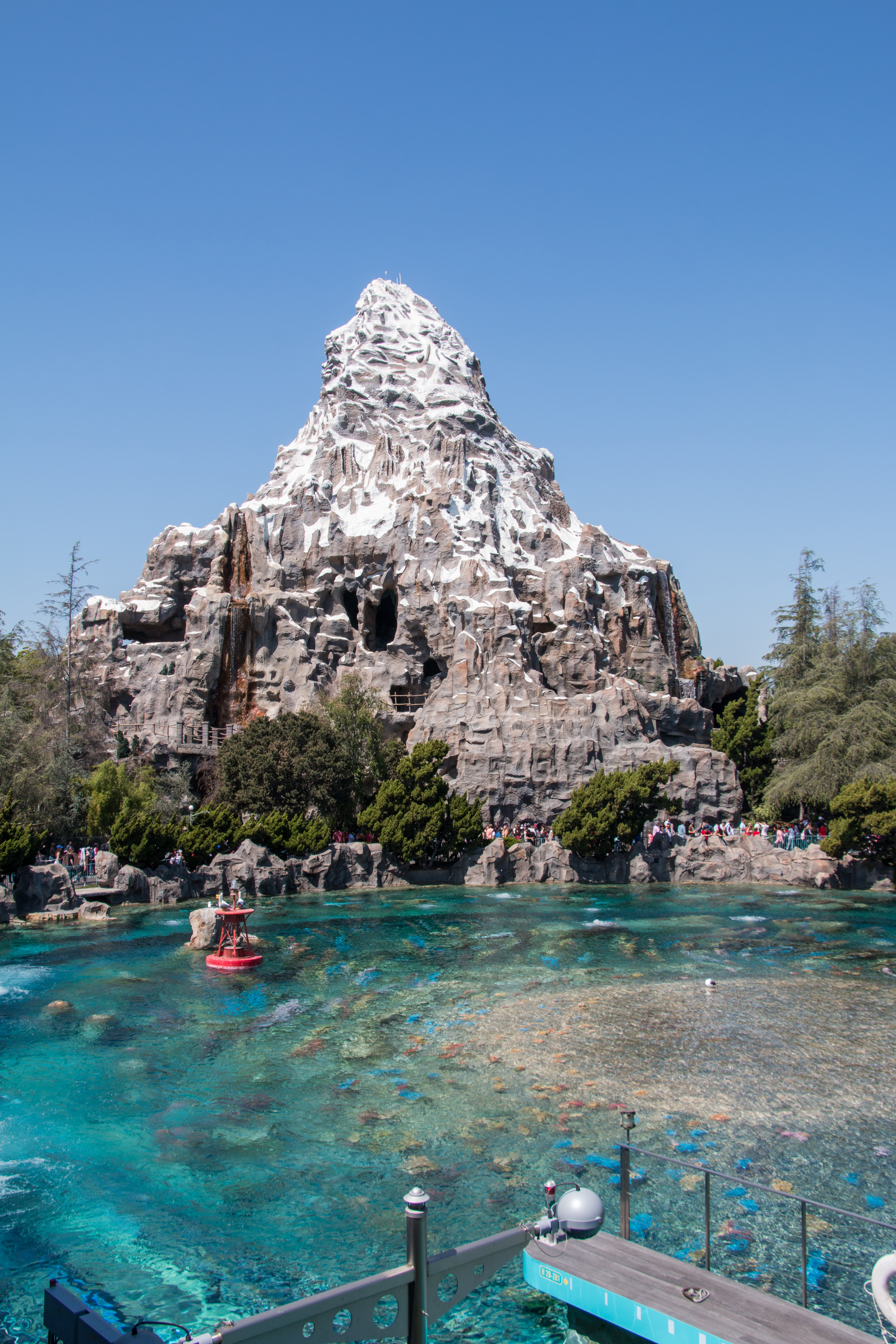
The Matterhorn as seen from the Tomorrowland monorail station.

The ride consists of two separate tracks that run roughly parallel to each other for much of the ride, intertwining and eventually deviating from each other at the loading areas. They are the Fantasyland track and Tomorrowland track, named for the side of the mountains where their loading lines begin. The vehicles originally held up to four passengers each, seated single-file. After the 1978 upgrade, the individual vehicles were joined into pairs, with lap seating increasing the capacity per train to eight. In 2012, the cars were replaced with new vehicles as part of a six-month ride closure, and it currently features two cars paired together with three single-file seats per car. The safety restraints consist of a lap seat belt. There are hand grips inside the cars, but there are no longer hand grips on the outside of the bobsled. Padding in the car is limited, and the winding track has many sharp turns, leading to a bone-shaking ride, reminiscent of an actual bobsled.

There is one lift hill on each track. Bobsleds ascend parallel to each other at the start of the ride, climbing past walls featuring snow-like special effects. The top of this lift hill constitutes the highest point of the ride itself, though the mountain continues upward for several more stories. The rest of the ride is a mostly unpowered coast through the Matterhorn's many caverns and passageways.

The splash-down pools at the end of each track serve dual purposes. They not only cool off the braking pads mounted on the underside of the bobsleds, but the impact into the water itself acts as a braking mechanism. Because of their constant exposure to water, the fiberglass bodies are regularly waxed.

For many years, a basketball half-court existed inside the structure above the coaster, near the top of the mountain, where the mountain climbers could play between climbs. As internal access to the mountain was locked for safety reasons, the court was accessible only to the climbers. The court was relocated slightly during the installation of the Tinkerbell flight equipment prior to the 50th-anniversary celebration; the hoop and playing area remain intact. There is a cast member break room inside the mountain at the base. The court is said by many cast members and the mountain's climbers to remain in existence today. At the end of the attraction, guests hear the now-famous "Remain seated please; Permanecer sentados por favor" safety announcement; it is one of many recordings by the former "Voice of Disneyland," Jack Wagner. The recording was changed in 2005 to say "Please remain seated with your seat belt fastened; Permanecer sentados por favor." The changed English dialogue is still in the voice of Jack Wagner, as it was borrowed from the attraction's breakdown announcement. This recording also introduces the Tomorrowland segment of the "Remember... Dreams Come True" fireworks show. The safety announcement was featured in the title track of the 1995 No Doubt album Tragic Kingdom, and the line was spoken by Barbie in the film Toy Story 2. In 2025, the original exit announcement was added back commemorating the park's 70th anniversary. The ride's safety message is

"For your safety, remain seated with your seat belts fastened, keeping your hands, arms, feet, and legs inside the bobsled. And be sure to watch your children. Auf Wiedersehen!"

Another variant goes,

"For your safety, remain seated with your seat belt fastened, keeping your hands, arms, feet, and legs inside the bobsled. And please, watch your kids. Thank you!"

=== Queue ===
Guests enter an Alpine-themed area at the base of the mountain decorated with flags of the Swiss Cantons. A large footprint cast of an unknown animal taken in 1978 sits on a post in front of the line. Guests are ushered into a bullpen shaped station where riders are either sent on the Tomorrowland, or Fantasyland track with Swiss polka music playing in the background.

=== Ride experience ===
Once guests have boarded the bobsled, riders enter a dark tunnel at the base of the mountain where strange growls are heard. The bobsleds then climb an 80 foot lift hill up towards the South part of the mountain. Near the top of the lift the bobsleds pass by a sheet of ice on each side where the Abominable Snowman simultaneously climbing the mountain is angered at the sight of intruders. Once the bobsled car has disengaged from the chain, riders pass through a dark tunnel, where the Abominable Snowman's roars echo. The trains emerge into a cavern filled with destroyed bobsleds, skyway buckets, some climbing equipment, and a crate stamped with "Wells Expedition" may also be seen. Both tracks take a left-hand turn, then split off before they can crash into the first animatronic. The cars swirl around the mountain, dipping under tunnels and by the waterfalls. Each track then passes another animatronic of the Snowman. Soon after the second encounter, riders plunge into the alpine lake and return to the station. No on-ride photo is available for this ride.

== Relations to other Disney parks ==
Disneyland in California is the only Disney theme park with a Matterhorn Bobsled ride. The tracks of Space Mountain at Walt Disney World's Magic Kingdom were based on the designs of the Matterhorn but are not identical to them. The Matterhorn's newer bobsleds, added in 1978, were based on the other ride's rockets, which had debuted in 1975. When Space Mountain was built at Disneyland, it was a completely new design with a single track and vehicles that seated riders side by side rather than behind one another. Various proposals to bring the Matterhorn to Walt Disney World existed over the years, but none came to fruition. The most detailed concept was for the Matterhorn to be the main attraction of a Switzerland Pavilion for the World Showcase at Epcot, but this failed when Disney could not secure a sponsor. Another detailed concept was a Mount Fuji version of the Matterhorn as the main attraction for the Japan Pavilion in the World Showcase at Epcot where riders would encounter Godzilla, but that failed as well.

Disney's Animal Kingdom contains a roller coaster with a similar theme: Expedition Everest. It is a railway adventure to the top of an abstract version of the Himalayan mountain where riders encounter another cryptozoological mountain beast, the Yeti.

== Other public events and changes ==
In the 1980s, the Matterhorn Ski Club (ride operators led by Chuck Abbott) began buying seeing eye dogs from Guide Dogs of the Desert with the unclaimed coins and knives that fell out of pockets during the ride. This soon expanded to collecting cans from every employee break area. At one time, the bottom floor of the Matterhorn was filled with bags of aluminum cans. The adopting dog owners were treated like royalty whenever they visited the park.

After the original 1978 Audio-Animatronic Abominable Snowman figures were removed in 2015, one was placed at the queue area of Disney California Adventure's Guardians of the Galaxy – Mission: Breakout! attraction, which opened on May 27, 2017. The figure is portrayed as one of the Collector's many artifacts on exhibition.

== In popular culture ==
The music video for Randy Newman's song "I Love L.A." shows the mountain when he sings "look at that mountain".

The song "Disney's Dream Debased" by the Fall (from the album The Wonderful and Frightening World Of...) was inspired by the 1984 decapitation accident, which happened on the Matterhorn very shortly after band members Mark and Brix Smith had been on the ride themselves.

The video game Epic Mickey has its own version of the Matterhorn named Mickeyjunk Mountain, which is littered with old and lost Mickey memorabilia.

The Abominable Snowman from the attraction appears in the 2013 Mickey Mouse short "Yodelberg", in which Mickey encounters the creature while climbing a mountain to see Minnie. The bobsled ride vehicles from the attraction litter the entrance of the beast's ice-cavern home.

Disney announced in 2011 that it would make a movie based on this attraction called The Hill, about five teenagers who go on a journey up the mountain and encounter a yeti. The company announced in 2021 that it would produce a film based on the attraction for their streaming service Disney+, with the working title Matterhorn.

The Water Coaster Aqua Mouse on the Disney cruise ship Disney Wish features the yeti in the storyline “Swiss Meltdown” where Mickey and Minnie are chased by the creature when trying to prevent a catastrophic meltdown.

Disney Television Animation's short series Chibi Tiny Tales featured a crossover short of the ride with Hailey's On It! characters meeting The Abominable Snowman.

== Gallery ==
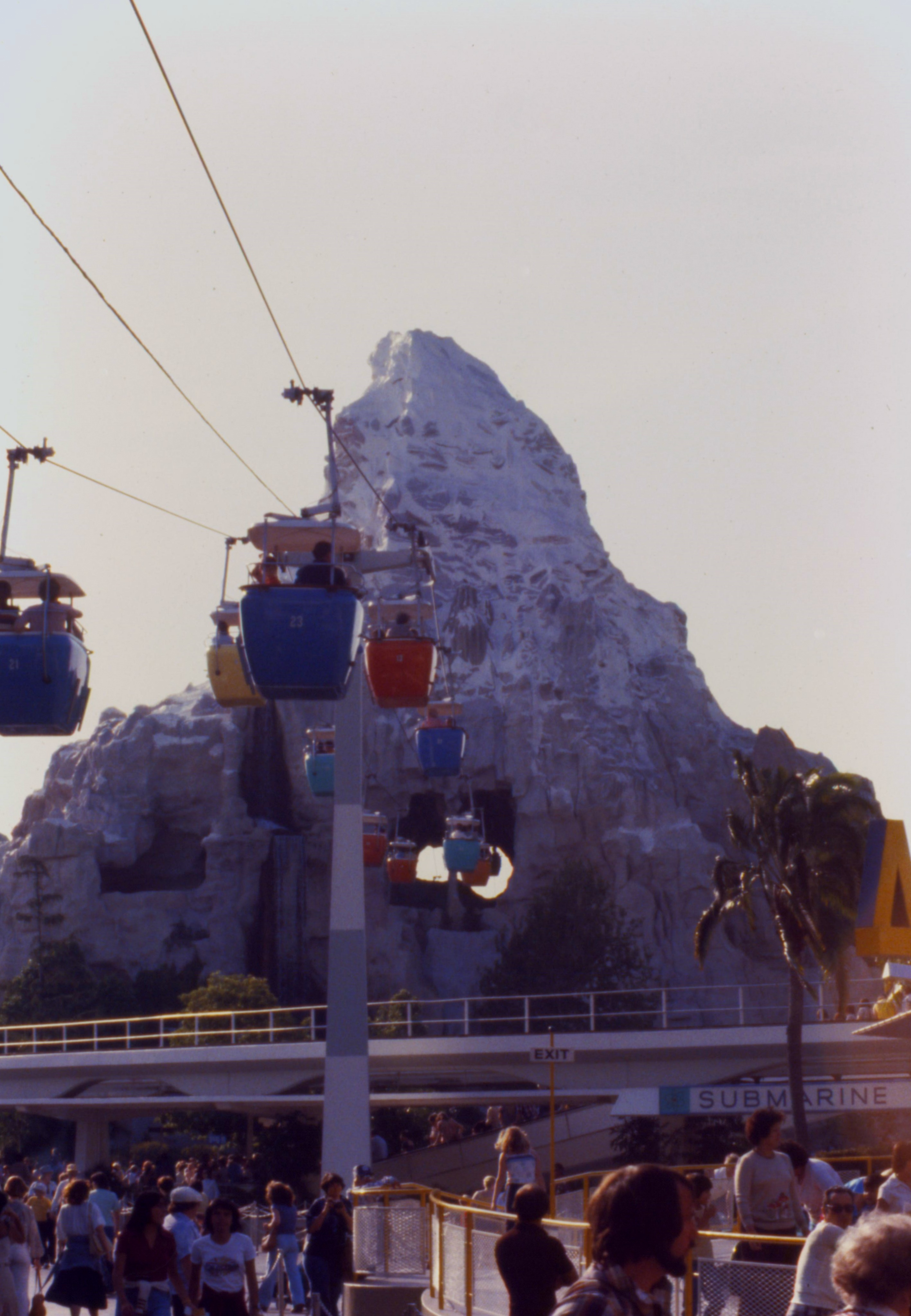
The Matterhorn and the Skyway in 1979

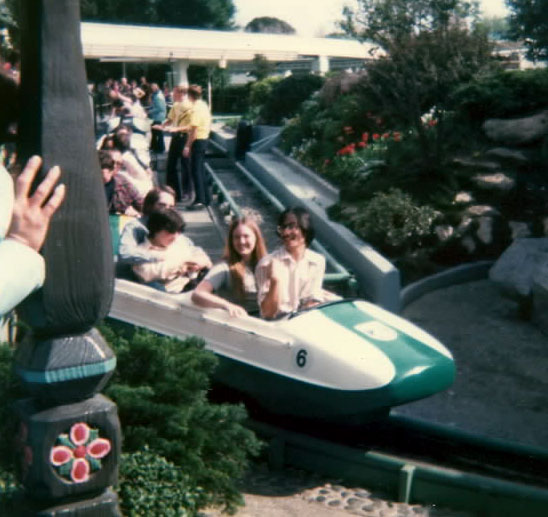
The original bobsled design (1959–1978)

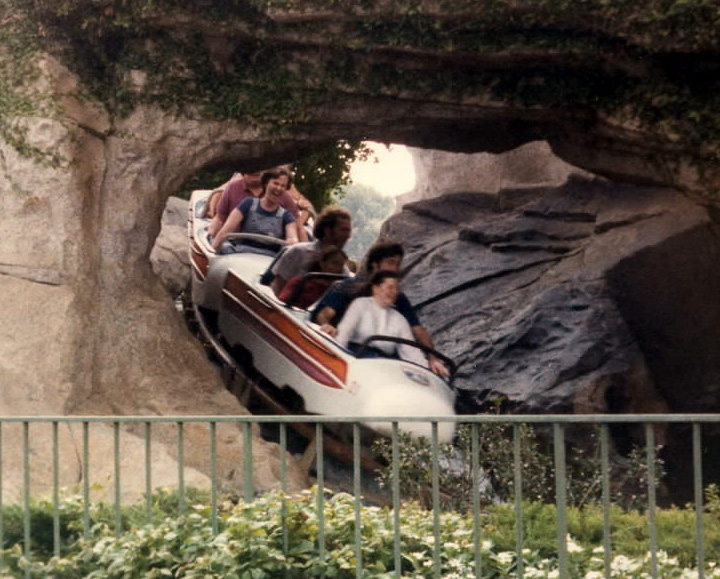
Updated bobsled design (1978–2012)

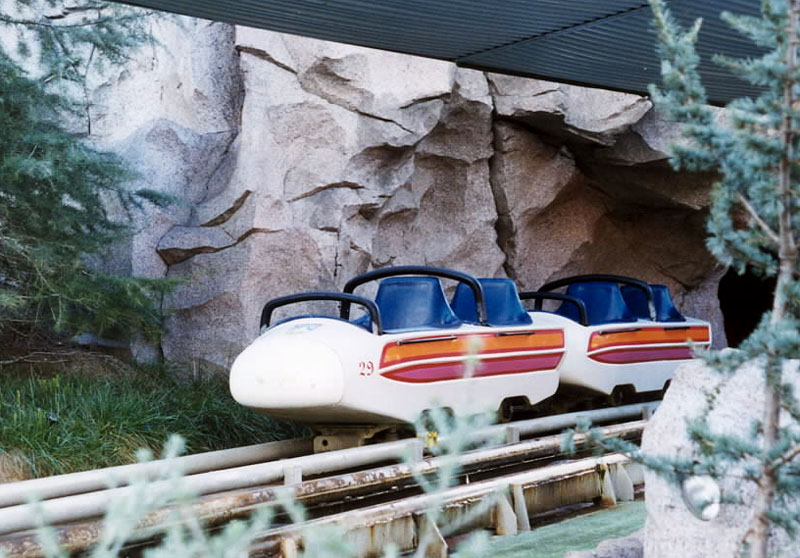
Alternate view of the updated design (1978–2012)

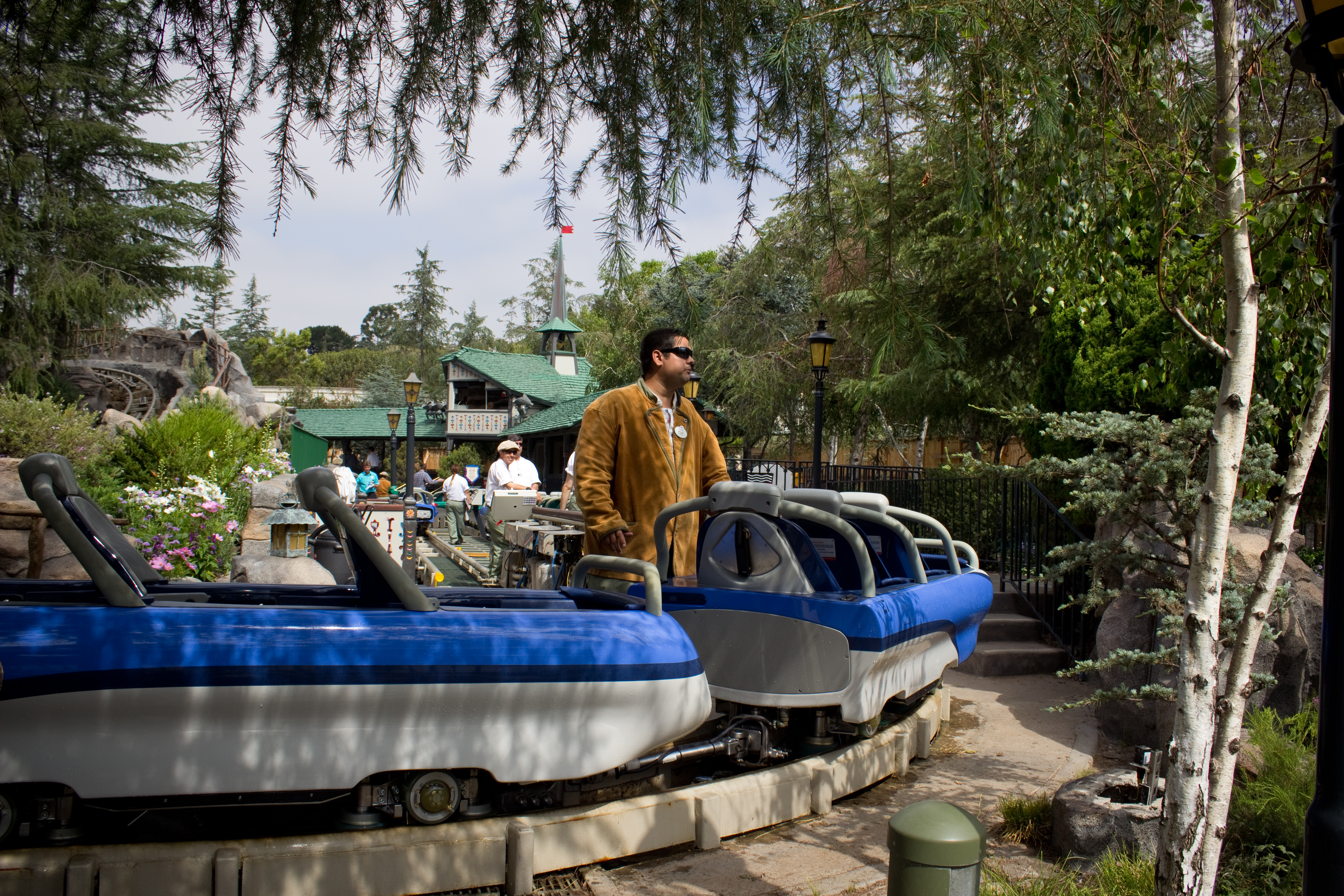
Current bobsled design (2012–Present)

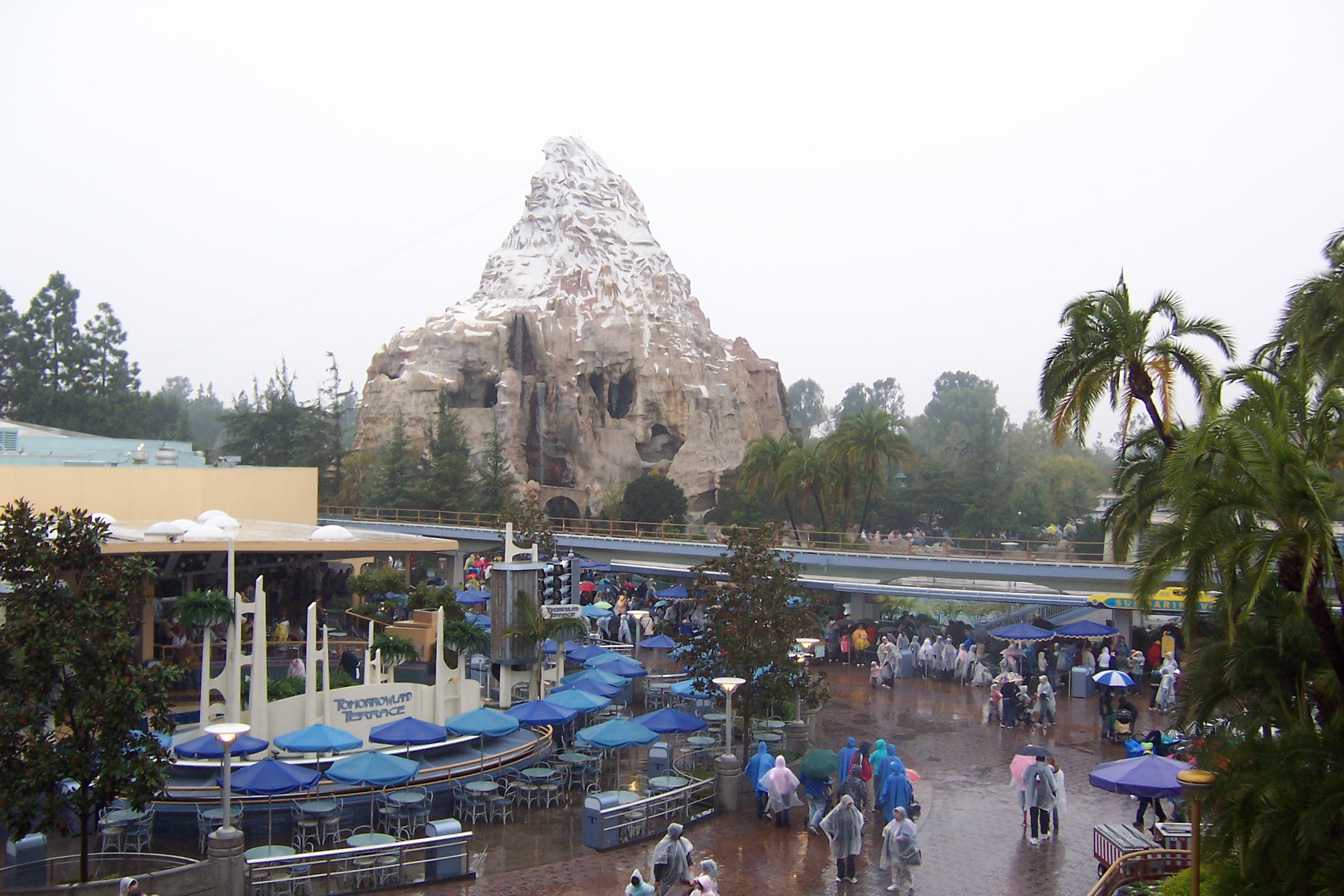
Matterhorn view from Tomorrowland

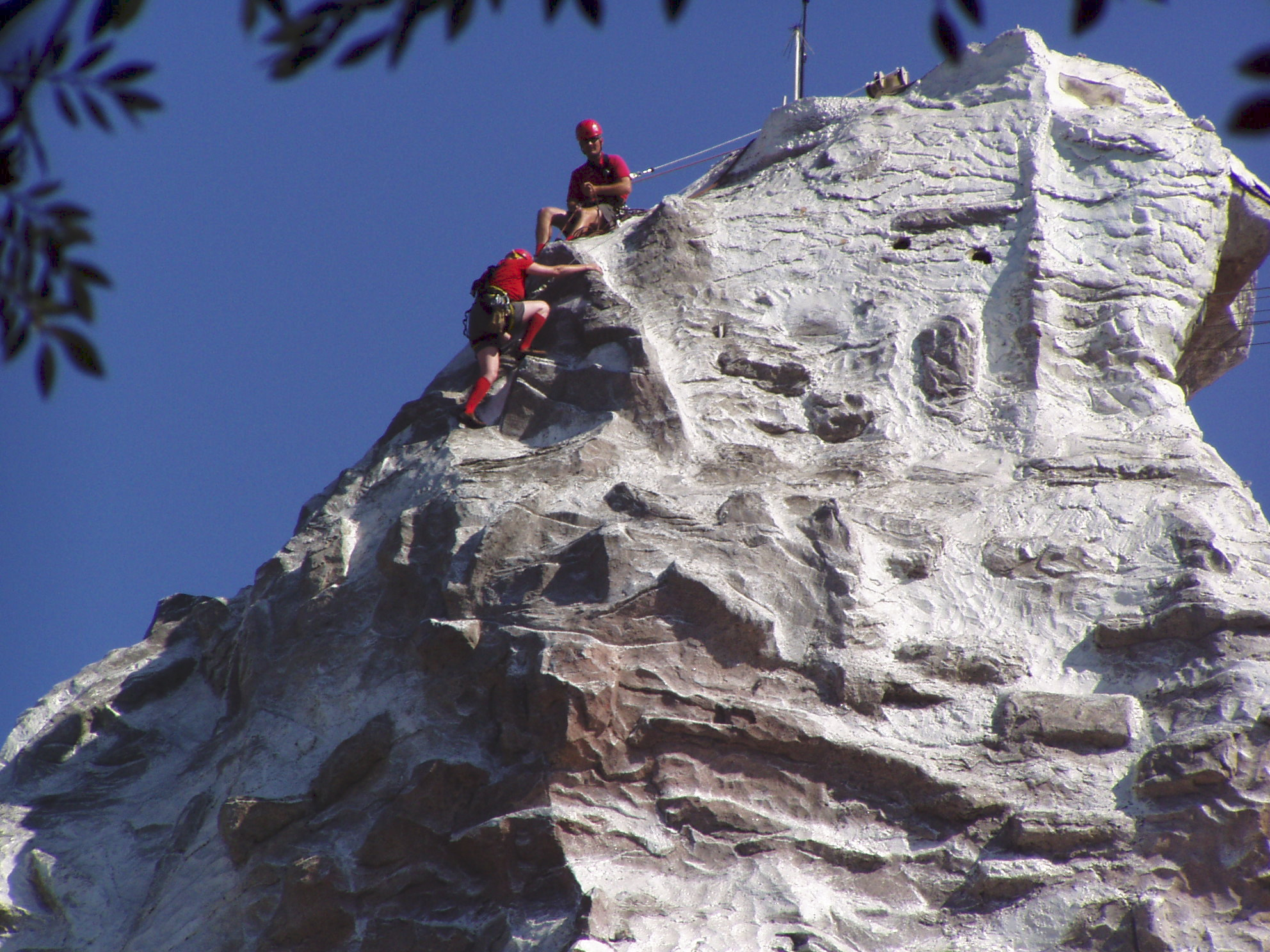
Climbers on the Matterhorn in 2005

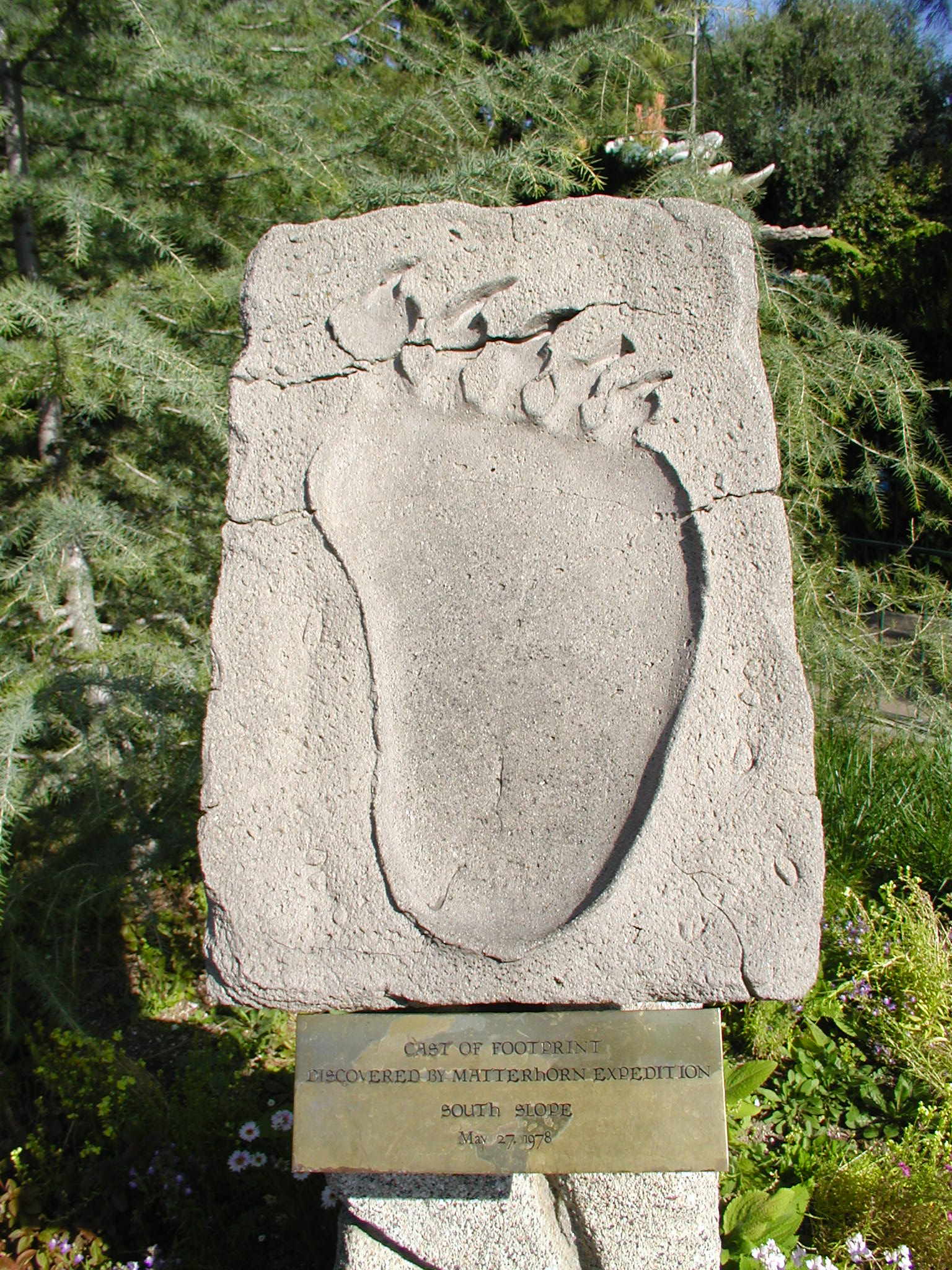
The Abominable Snowman's Footprint near the entrance of the attraction.

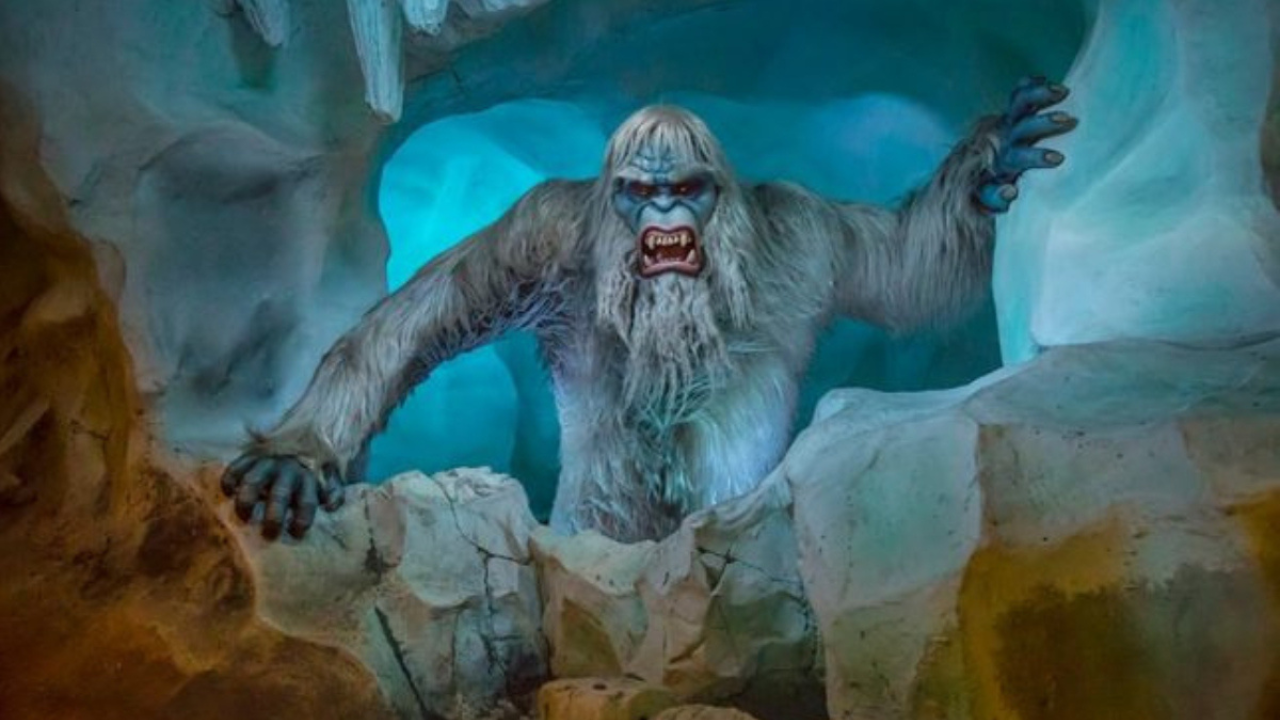
One of the updated Abominable Snowman figures (2015-Present)

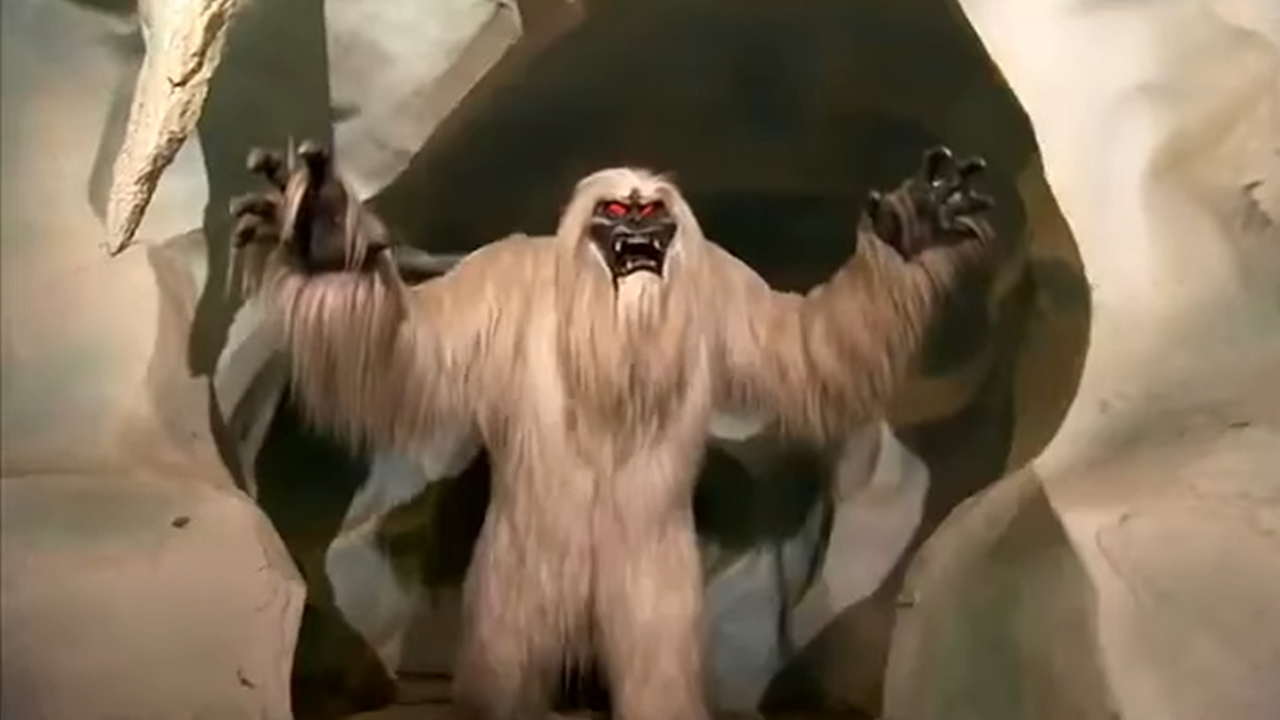
One of the old Abominable Snowman figures (1978–2015)

== See also ==
- Expedition Everest, a similarly themed roller coaster at Disney's Animal Kingdom
- List of Disneyland attractions
- Incidents at Disneyland Resort
- Disneyland Park (Paris)
- List of references to the Matterhorn
