= Los Lobos Goes Disney =

Studio album by Los Lobos
- Released: 27 October 2009
- Studio: CRG Studio, Rowland Heights, California
- Genre: Roots Rock, children's music
- Length: 38:44
- Label: Disney Sound
- Producer: Los Lobos

Los Lobos chronology
The Town and the City (2006)	Los Lobos Goes Disney (2009)	Tin Can Trust (2010)

Professional ratings
Review scores
Source	Rating
AllMusic	3.5/5 stars
Glide Magazine	4/10 stars
The Music Box	3/5 stars

Los Lobos Goes Disney is a covers album by the Mexican American rock group Los Lobos, on which the band interprets songs from the Disney catalogue, most of which were featured in their animated films. It was released on 27 October 2009 through Disney Sound.

The album blends different musical styles across thirteen songs, such as rock and roll, surf-rock, Americana, country folk, Mexican norteño and Tejano music, Cajun, zydeco, ska, and blues jazz. Los Lobos saxophone player Steve Berlin said, "The kids record doesn't sound like a kids record. It just sounds like Los Lobos playing funky old songs."

== Reception ==
AllMusic reviewer William Ruhlmann gave the album a rating of three-and-a-half stars out of five, and wrote, "Los Lobos Goes Disney could have been called Disney goes Los Lobos instead, since the group applies its familiar mixture of musical styles to Disney songs." He added that the band's interpretations "are hardly definitive, but they are enjoyable".

Doug Collette, writing for Glide Magazine, gave it five out of ten, saying that right from the start of album opener "Heigh Ho", "it's apparent Los Lobos inhabit the music as much as it inhabits them. An onslaught of percussion gives way to chanting in Spanish, an arrangement that might just as easily adorn one of the band's originals." Collette also felt that the band were "as tasteful as usual throughout".

John Metzger of The Music Box magazine gave the album three stars out of five, and said that the original songs aren't necessarily well suited to Los Lobos' style, "so the success of Los Lobos Goes Disney largely is dependent upon the band's ability to find a unique perspective for delivering this material ... the results are merely adequate, even if they are passively enjoyable."

The Fowler Tribune's Patrick Varine called it "a really, really entertaining cover album", and said that it "plays just as well for kids as it will for adults".

== Track listing ==
No.	Title	Writer(s)	Length
1.	"Heigh-Ho" (Snow White and the Seven Dwarfs)	Larry Morey, Frank Churchill	2:37
2.	"I Wan'na Be Like You" (The Jungle Book)	Robert B. Sherman, Richard M. Sherman	3:38
3.	"Not in Nottingham" (Robin Hood)	Roger Miller	3:19
4.	"The Tiki, Tiki, Tiki Room" (Walt Disney's Enchanted Tiki Room)	Sherman, Sherman	2:50
5.	"Grim Grinning Ghosts" (The Haunted Mansion)	Francis Xavier Atencio, Buddy Baker	3:32
6.	"I Will Go Sailing No More" (Toy Story)	Randy Newman	2:22
7.	"The Ugly Bug Ball" (Summer Magic)	Sherman, Sherman	3:27
8.	"Cruella De Vil" (One Hundred and One Dalmatians)	Mel Leven	3:47
9.	"Bella Notte" (Lady and the Tramp)	Sonny Burke, Peggy Lee	2:50
10.	"Zip-a-Dee-Doo-Dah" (Song of the South)	Ray Gilbert, Allie Wrubel	2:48
11.	"The Bare Necessities" (The Jungle Book)	Terry Gilkyson	2:58
12.	"Oo-De-Lally" (Robin Hood)	Miller	2:09
13.	"When You Wish Upon a Star / It's a Small World" (Pinocchio / It's a Small World)	Leigh Harline, Ned Washington / Sherman, Sherman	2:27

== Personnel ==
Credits adapted from the album's liner notes.

Los Lobos

- David Hidalgo – vocals, guitar, accordion, hidalguera, requinto jarocho, keyboards
- Cesar Rosas – vocals, guitar, bajo sexto
- Louie Pérez – vocals, guitar, jarana
- Conrad Lozano – vocals, bass, guitarron
- Steve Berlin – saxophone, flute, percussion, keyboards

Additional musicians

- Cougar Estrada – drums, percussion, keyboards
- Vicki Rosas – vocals on "Grim Grinning Ghosts"

Production

- Los Lobos – producer
- Mark Johnson – engineer, mixing
- Greg Morgenstein – engineer, mixing
- Dave McNair – mastering
- Mando Tavares – production assistance
- Louie Pérez – art direction
- Steve Gerdes – art direction
- Anabel Sinn – album design
- Louie Pérez III – drawing
