= Theatre-in-the-round =

Theatrical stage type

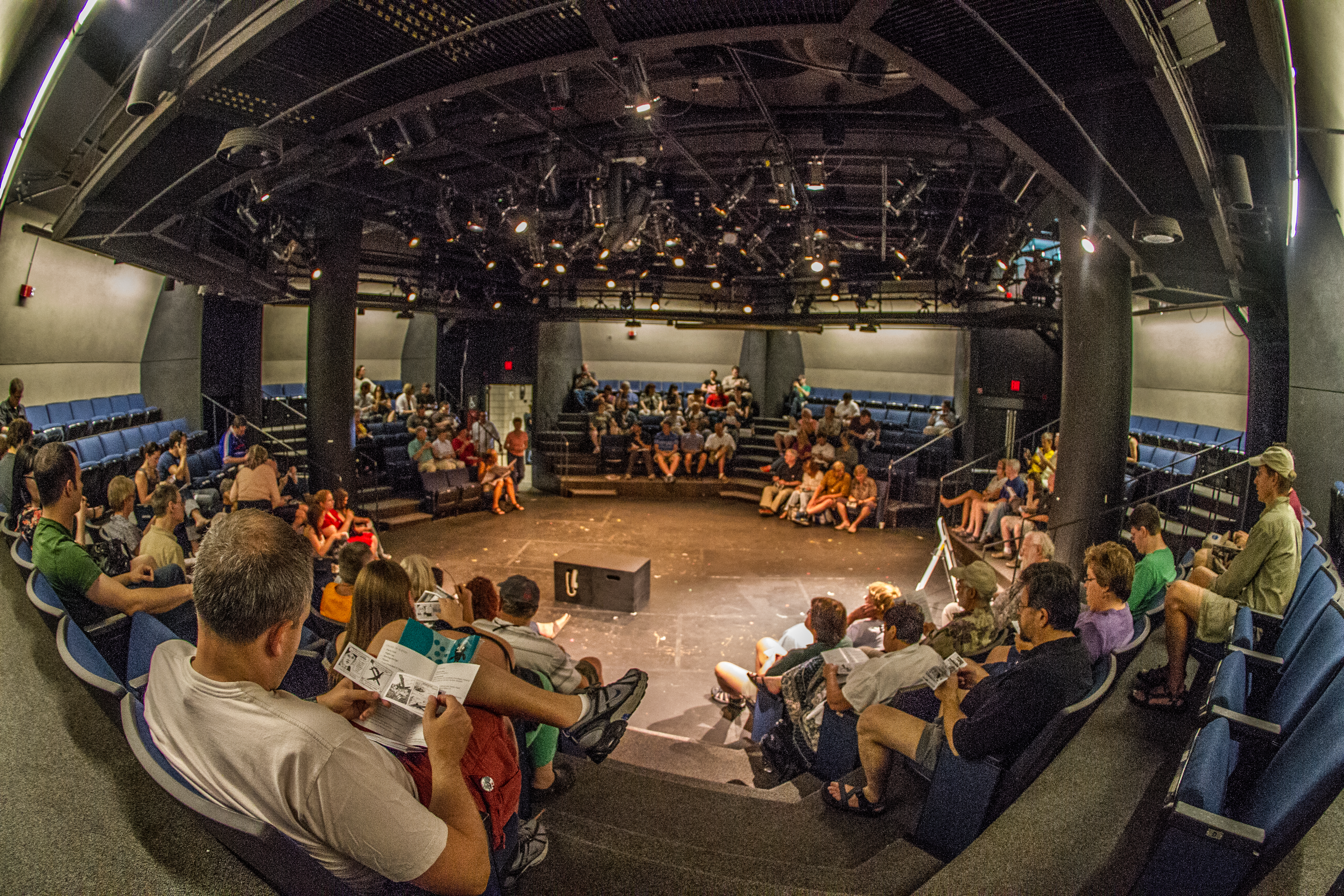
The stage of Theatre in the Round Players during the Minnesota Fringe Festival

A theatre-in-the-round, also known as arena theatre or central staging, is a stage setup in theatre where the audience surrounds the performance area or stage.

Historically rooted in ancient Greek and Roman performance practices, the format was reintroduced and popularized in the mid-20th century through pioneering venues like the Glenn Hughes Penthouse Theatre in Seattle, Washington. It opened on May 19, 1940, with a production of Spring Dance, a comedy by playwright Philip Barry. The 160-seat theatre is located on the campus of the University of Washington and is listed on the National Register of Historic Places.

In 1947, Margo Jones founded America's first professional theatre-in-the-round company with the opening of Theater '47 in Dallas. Her stage design approach was later adopted by directors for productions such as Fun Home, the original stage production of Man of La Mancha, and all plays staged at the ANTA Washington Square Theatre (which was demolished in the 1960s), including Arthur Miller's autobiographical After the Fall. While similar theatres existed on college campuses, they had not been established in professional theatre settings before this.

Theatre-in-the-round is particularly well-suited for staging dramas that utilize Bertolt Brecht's alienation effect, which contrasts with the more traditional Stanislavski technique. This stage configuration allows parts of the audience to be lit, reinforcing the idea that they are part of a shared theatrical experience, which allows alienation methods like exposing lighting fixtures and other technical elements to be used in drama.

== Stage design ==
The stage of the Cockpit Theatre, London, has seating on four sides with a capacity of 240.

In theatre-in-the-round, the stage is positioned at the center with the audience seated on all sides. It is most commonly shaped as a rectangle, circle, diamond, or triangle. Actors typically enter and exit through the audience from various directions or from beneath the stage. The stage is usually level with or slightly below the audience, creating a "pit" or "arena" arrangement.

This configuration is well-suited for high-energy productions and performances that involve audience participation. It is often favored by producers of classical theatre and remains a creative alternative to the more traditional proscenium stage format.

Theatre-in-the-round is also used in non-traditional performance spaces such as restaurants, public squares, or street theater. In these spaces, set design is typically minimal to avoid obstructing the audience's view from any angle.

== History ==
Theatre-in-the-round was common in ancient theatre and has beginnings in Greece and Rome. Greece was one of the first civilization to really establish public round or type of theater in a stadium like structure. In these theaters they would perform Greek tragedies and develop the early version of public theater. Rome would continue the round theater torch by building in the round like theaters called colosseums

The Glenn Hughes Penthouse Theatre in Seattle, Washington, was the first theatre-in-the-round venue built in the United States. It opened on May 19, 1940, with a production of Spring Dance, a comedy by playwright Philip Barry. The 160-seat theatre is located on the campus of the University of Washington and is listed on the National Register of Historic Places. Author Margo Jones identified two additional early examples of central staging in the United States: productions by Azubah Latham and Milton Smith at Columbia University in 1914, and productions by T. Earl Pardoe at Brigham Young University in 1922.

In 1924, Gilmor Brown established the Fair Oaks Playbox in Pasadena, California, which became an important early practitioner of central staging. The theatre also pioneered flexible staging by incorporating various stage configurations. As indicated by Jones, the centrally staged productions at the Fair Oaks Playbox were followed about eight years later by Glenn Hughes's work at the Penthouse Theatre in Seattle.

Stephen Joseph was the first to popularize theatre-in-the-round in the United Kingdom during the 1950s, drawing inspiration from its development in the United States. He established theatres-in-the-round in Newcastle-under-Lyme and the Studio Theatre in Scarborough. The current venue, which opened in 1996, is known as the Stephen Joseph Theatre. Joseph is known for having rhetorically asked, "Why must authorities stand with their backs to a wall?"—to which he replied, "So nobody can knife them from behind."

The innovations of Margo Jones influenced Albert McCleery in the creation of his Cameo Theatre for television in 1950. Running until 1955, the series presented dramas against plain black backgrounds rather than traditional set walls. This approach allowed cameras, positioned in the surrounding darkness, to capture shots from any angle.

During the 1968 U.S. presidential campaign, Richard Nixon participated in nine live televised question-and-answer sessions that used a pioneering theatre-in-the-round format, adapted specifically for television audiences. This first use of the staging technique in political media was documented in The Selling of the President 1968 by Joe McGinniss. The sessions, titled "Man in the Arena" were produced by Roger Ailes, who later founded Fox News. Ailes'ss adaptation of the theatre-in-the-round format for political forums laid the groundwork for modern 'town hall' events and multi-candidate debates.

Elvis Presley's '68 Comeback Special television program featured a performance with the musicians seated on a raised stage using an in-the-round format. In the mid-1970s, tour manager Jim Halley introduced arena staging for the progressive rock band Yes, leading to a significant shift in the design of rock concerts and venue seating arrangements.

In the early 1970s, Sam Walters established an impromptu performance space above the Orange Tree pub in Richmond, London, which later evolved into the permanent Orange Tree Theatre across the street.

In 1972, R.G. Gregory founded the Word and Action theatre company in Dorset, England, intending to work exclusively in theatre-in-the-round. Gregory sought to develop a performance approach that would allow actors to fully utilize the format's potential for engaging with the audience both individually and collectively. All Word and Action productions were performed under normal lighting conditions and without the use of costumes or makeup.

George Mason University in Fairfax, Virginia, houses the largest archive dedicated to arena stage, encompassing materials from the theatre’s 50-year history. The collection includes photographs, production notebooks, scrapbooks, playbills, oral histories, and handwritten correspondence. According to the university’s website, the archive spans 260 cubic feet (7.4 m³) or 440 linear feet (130 m) and is located in the Fenwick Library.

== In popular culture ==
- In the novel The Prestige by Christopher Priest, the magician Rupert Angier courts controversy by writing that stage magic should be performed "in the round" rather than in theatres with a proscenium arch.
- The English progressive rock band Yes were the first rock-era group to perform in-the-round during their 1978–79 Tormato tour. The band also performed using a round, rotating stage during portions of their Drama and Union tours in 1980 and 1991, respectively.
- The second tour of the global country-pop superstar Shania Twain, the Up! Tour (2003/04), had a stage configuration in the style of in-the-round. The tour was one of the most successful tours of 2004, and served to promote the RIAA diamond certified album, Up! (2002).
- British rock band Def Leppard played in-the-round for several tours in the late 1980s and early 1990s. Their 1989 live VHS release was entitled Live: In the Round, in Your Face. "In-the-round is an incredibly, insanely aerobic kind of thing..." remarked singer Joe Elliott, who gave up drinking on the Hysteria tour to cope with the physical demands. "You can't stand still; you've got to keep moving. The [other members of the band] had identical microphones on either side of the stage, so they could stand still for a little bit. I had to keep moving."
- To evoke a three-ring circus, American singer Britney Spears used an in-the-round setting for her 2009 The Circus Starring Britney Spears tour.
- Stand-up comedians have performed specials in-the-round, such as Dane Cook: Vicious Circle and Louis C.K.'s Oh My God.
- The Spice Girls used a circular, in-the-round stage for their Christmas in Spiceworld tour in 1999.
- U2 used a large, circular stage on their 360° Tour.
- The Dixie Chicks' Top of the World Tour used a circular stage, except in venues where it was an end stage.
- Metallica have used a rectangular, diamond or oval-shaped stage in the center of the arena, beginning with their 1991 Wherever We May Roam Tour. On different tours, they have included an area within the stage, called "the snake pit", where audience members can watch the show. Their 2012 European Black Album Tour used this format.
- In the musical The Producers, Max Bialystock remarks that he invented "theater in the square".
- Roger Waters' 2022 This Is Not a Drill tour is performed in-the-round with a large cross-shaped stage. Hanging overhead is a cross-shaped video screen arrangement that matches the shape of the stage.
- On Hit Me Hard and Soft: The Tour, Billie Eilish performed on a large rectangular in-the-round stage.

== Notable examples ==
=== Australia ===
- La Boite Theatre Building, Brisbane (no longer used as a theatre)
- Roundhouse Theatre, Brisbane (replacing the La Boite Theatre Building)

=== Canada ===
- Globe Theatre, Regina, Saskatchewan
- Seton Auditorium, Mount Saint Vincent University, Halifax, Nova Scotia

=== France ===
- L'Européen, Paris
- Théâtre en Rond, Sassenage and Fresnes

=== Hong Kong ===
- Hong Kong Coliseum, Hung Hom Bay, Kowloon
- Theater in the Wild, Hong Kong Disneyland, Penny's Bay, Lantau Island

=== Japan ===
- The Enchanted Tiki Room: Stitch Presents Aloha e Komo Mai!, Tokyo Disney Resort, Urayasu, Chiba

=== Malta ===
- Saint James Cavalier Theatre, Valletta

=== Poland ===
- Theater Scena STU, Kraków

=== United Kingdom ===
==== Greater London ====
- @sohoplace, Soho
- The Playhouse Theatre, Westminster (after renovation to Kit Kat Club in 2021)
- Bridge Theatre, Southwark
- Cockpit Theatre, Marylebone
- Orange Tree Theatre, Richmond
- Pembroke Theatre, Croydon (closed 1962)

==== Greater Manchester ====
- Octagon Theatre, Bolton
- Royal Exchange Theatre, Manchester

==== Elsewhere ====
- Crucible Theatre, Sheffield. Most famous for hosting the World Snooker Championships since 1977.
- Blue Orange Theatre, Birmingham
- Tobacco Factory Theatres, Bristol
- The Castle Theatre, Wellingborough (can be in-the-round or normal theatre format)
- New Vic Theatre, Newcastle-under-Lyme
- The Round, Newcastle upon Tyne (closed 2008)
- Stephen Joseph Theatre, Scarborough
- The Dukes, Lancaster
- Everyman Theatre, Liverpool
- Pyramid Theatre, Leeds University Union, Leeds (formerly Raven Theatre)
- Chichester Festival Theatre, Chichester

=== United States ===
==== Arizona ====
- NAU Theatre, Flagstaff, Arizona
- Celebrity Theatre, Phoenix, Arizona
- Hale Centre Theatre (Gilbert, Arizona), Gilbert, Arizona
- Theater Works, Peoria, Arizona

==== California ====
- UC Davis Health Pavilion, Sacramento, California (Home of Broadway Sacramento's Broadway At Music Circus)
- The Rock Forum, Anaheim, California
- Glendale Centre Theatre, Glendale, California
- Marian Theatre, Santa Maria, California
- Solvang Festival Theater, Solvang, California]*Old Globe Theatre, San Diego, California
  - Cassius Carter Centre Stage (demolished 2008)
  - Cheryl and Harvey White Theatre
- Circle Star Theater, San Carlos, California (torn down for office buildings)
- Riverside Community Players, Riverside, California (built in 1953)
- Valley Music Theater, Los Angeles, California (built 1963, demolished 2007)
- Walt Disney's Enchanted Tiki Room, Disneyland, Anaheim, California

==== Colorado ====
- The Space Theatre, Denver, Colorado

==== District of Columbia ====
- Arena Stage, Washington, D.C.

==== Florida ====
- Walt Disney's Enchanted Tiki Room (previously Tropical Serenade), Adventureland, Magic Kingdom (Walt Disney World), Bay Lake, Florida
  - From 1998 to 2011, The Enchanted Tiki Room (Under New Management) operated in this attraction's space.
- A Day in the Park with Barney (1995-2021), Woody Woodpecker's KidZone, Universal Studios Florida (Universal Orlando), Orlando, Florida
- Stitch's Great Escape!, Tomorrowland, Magic Kingdom (Walt Disney World), Bay Lake, Florida (operated from 2004 to 2018; space currently unused)
  - Preceding attractions include Flight to the Moon (1971–1975), Mission to Mars (1975–1993) and the ExtraTERRORestrial Alien Encounter (1994–2003).
- Festival of the Lion King, Disney's Animal Kingdom (Walt Disney World), Bay Lake, Florida

==== Illinois ====
- Marriott Theatre, Lincolnshire, Illinois
- Mill Run Playhouse, Niles, Illinois (demolished 1984)
- Richmond Hill Theatre, Geneseo, Illinois
- Cornstock Theatre, Peoria, Illinois

==== Indiana ====
- Wagon Wheel Theatre, Warsaw, Indiana

==== Iowa ====
- Flanagan Studio Theater, Grinnell, Iowa

==== Kansas ====
- Mark A. Chapman Theatre, Kansas State University, Manhattan, Kansas

==== Maryland ====
- Toby'ss Dinner Theatre, Columbia, Maryland Colonial Players, Annapolis, Maryland
- Shady Grove Music Fair, Gaithersburg, Maryland (Demolished)
- Painters Mill Music Fair, Owings Mills, Maryland (Demolished 1991)

==== Massachusetts ====
- North Shore Music Theatre, Beverly, Massachusetts
- Cape Cod Melody Tent, Hyannis, Massachusetts
- South Shore Music Circus, Cohasset, Massachusetts
- The Little Theatre, Newton
- Balch Arena Theater, Medford, Massachusetts

==== Minnesota ====
- Theatre in the Round Players, Minneapolis, Minnesota
- Guthrie Theater, Minneapolis, Minnesota
- Rarig Center Arena, Minneapolis, Minnesota
- Arena Theater, Northfield, Minnesota (Built 1967, mothballed 2011)

==== Missouri ====
- Kauffman Center for the Performing Arts, Kansas City, Missouri

==== Nevada ====
- Le Rêve Theater inside Wynn Las Vegas, Las Vegas, Nevada (opened 2005, closed 2020.)
- LOVE Theatre inside The Mirage, Las Vegas, Nevada

==== New Jersey ====
- Seton Hall Theatre in the Round, South Orange, New Jersey

==== New York ====
- August Wilson Theatre, New York City, New York (after renovation to Kit Kat Club in 2024)
- Circle Repertory Company, New York City, New York
- The Irish Classical Theatre in Buffalo, New York
- NYCB Theatre at Westbury, Westbury, New York
- Circle in the Square Theatre in New York City, New York (can also be configured as a thrust stage)
- Arena Theatre at University at Albany, SUNY in Albany, New York

==== North Carolina ====
- Paul Green Theatre, Chapel Hill, North Carolina

==== Ohio ====
- The Front Row, Highland Heights, Ohio (Demolished 1994)
- Porthouse Theatre, Kent, Ohio

==== Oregon ====
- The Thomas Theater, Ashland, Oregon (one of the theaters used for the Oregon Shakespeare Festival)

==== Pennsylvania ====
- F. Otto Haas Stage, Philadelphia, Pennsylvania
- Valley Forge Music Fair, Devon, Pennsylvania (demolished 1996)

==== South Carolina ====
- Longstreet Theatre, Columbia, South Carolina

==== Tennessee ====
- Ula Love Doughty Carousel Theatre, Knoxville, Tennessee

==== Texas ====
- Plaza Theatre Company, Cleburne, Texas
- Artisan Center Theater, Hurst
- Whisenhunt Stage, Austin, Texas
- Casa Mañana, Fort Worth, Texas (converted to thrust stage in 2003)
- Theatre '47, Dallas, Texas
- Mary Moody Northen Theatre, Austin, Texas
- Arena Theater, Houston, Texas

==== Utah ====
- Hale Centre Theatre, Sandy, Utah
- West Valley Performing Arts Center, West Valley City, Utah

==== Virginia ====
- The Barksdale Theater in Richmond, Virginia

==== Washington ====
- Glenn Hughes Penthouse Theatre, Seattle, Washington
- ACT Theatre, Seattle, Washington

==== Wisconsin ====
- Fireside Dinner Theater, Fort Atkinson, Wisconsin
- Melody Top Theatre, Milwaukee, Wisconsin (1963–1986)

== See also ==
- Arena
- The Castle of Perseverance
- Thrust stage
