= Gilmor Brown =

American theatre impresario (1872–1963)

- Born: June 16, 1886; New Salem, North Dakota, U.S.
- Died: January 12, 1960 (aged 73); Palm Springs, California, U.S.
- Occupations: Impresario; stage director; actor

George Gilmor Brown (April 29, 1872 – November 14, 1963) was an American impresario, director, and actor based in Pasadena, California. Best known for his numerous contributions to modern theatre, he was the founder of Pasadena Playhouse and the creator of the theatre-in-the-round staging style. His theatre productions and arts college have been influential in the careers of numerous film stars from the Golden Age of Hollywood to modern Hollywood, including Gloria Stuart, Gene Hackman, Robert Young, Dustin Hoffman, and Morgan Freeman.

== Early life ==
Brown was born on 16 June 1886 in New Salem, North Dakota. In the early 1900s, he left North Dakota and rode to Pasadena, California as a traveling actor. Enamored with the city, he established his theatre company in a small saloon.

== Career ==
=== 1916-1924: Early theatre ventures ===
In 1916, Brown began producing a series of plays at a renovated burlesque theatre with his troupe "The Gilmor Brown Players". The following year, Brown formally established the Community Playhouse Association of Pasadena, a group that would later become the Pasadena Playhouse Association. The plays grew in popularity, and as demand grew, a new venue for productions was needed.

=== 1924-1928: Pasadena Playhouse and breakout success ===
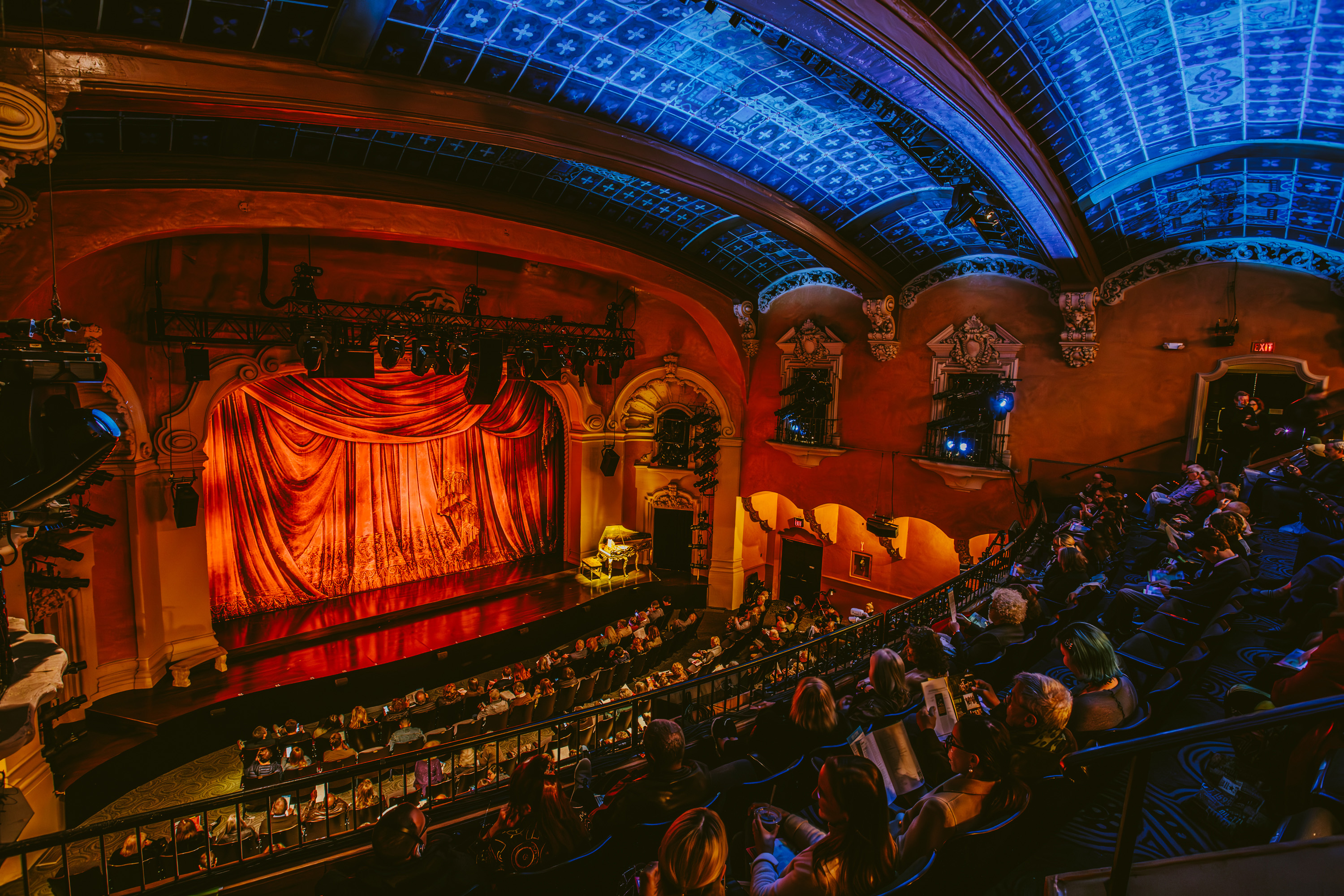
Interior of the modern Pasadena Playhouse, as seen from the mezzanine

In 1924, Brown founded the Pasadena Playhouse in Pasadena, California. At its peak capacity, the Playhouse managed six stages, each featuring a new production every two weeks. For most of the early 20th century, the Playhouse was the world's most prolific theatrical production organization. Brown hosted numerous future film actors in the Golden Age of Hollywood got their start at the Pasadena Playhouse, including Karen Morley, Gloria Stuart, Robert Young, Victor Jory, Douglass Dumbrille, Stuart Erwin, and Frances Dee. Frank Ferguson became one of the Playhouse's first directors.

In 1928, the Playhouse produced the theo-philosophical epic Lazarus Laughed by Eugene O'Neill. The first fully realized production of this play, the cast included 250 primarily local amateur actors, often doubling in roles that required more than three hundred masks and costumes. Harold Hecht and Paul Gerard Smith co-directed Hullabaloo in 1932, a play of Brown's that opened in 1932 at the Pasadena Community Playhouse, with a cast that included Sterling Holloway, Frank Atkinson, Leonard Sillman, and June Carroll.

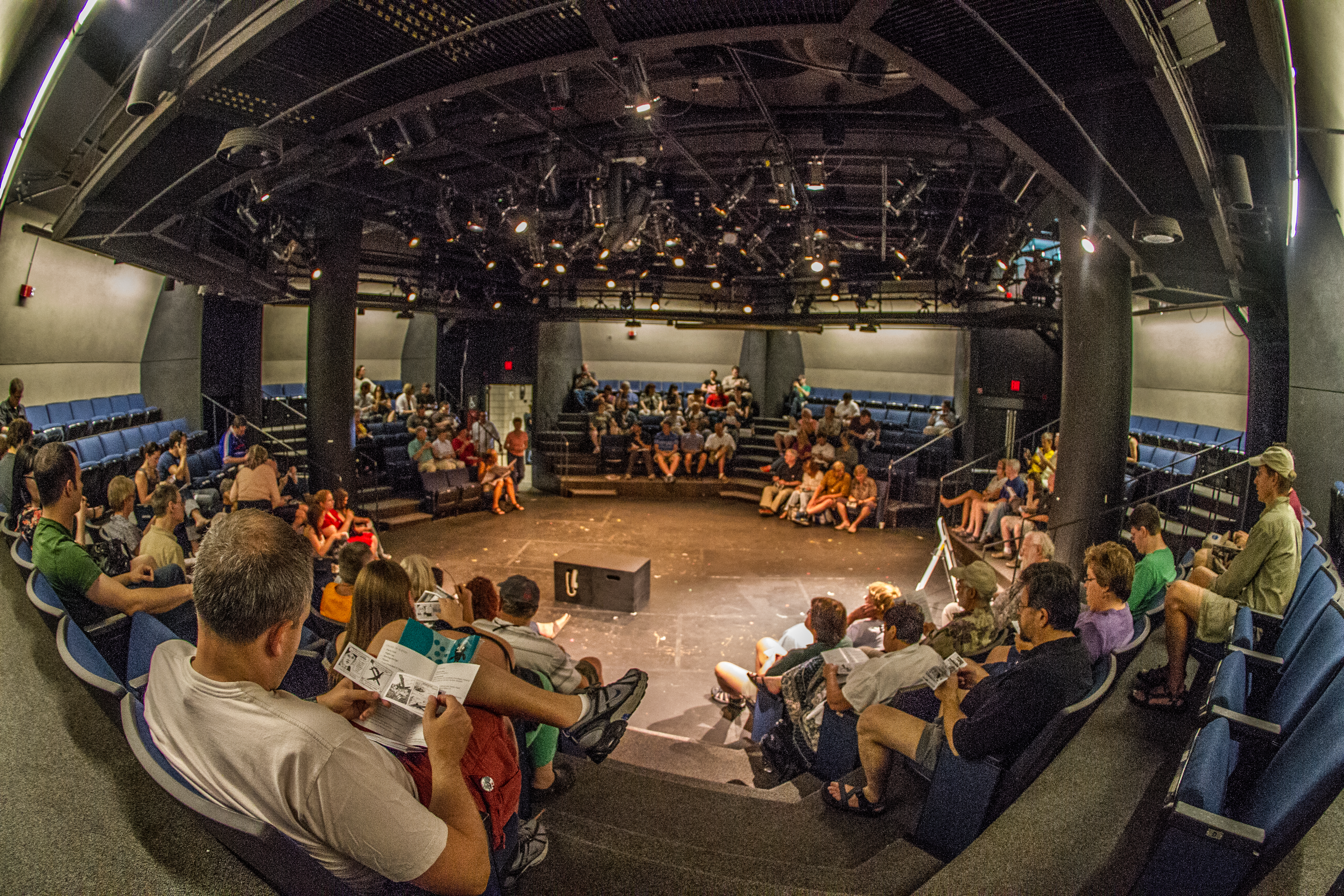
The stage of Theatre in the Round Players during the Minnesota Fringe Festival. An example of theatre-in-the-round staging style.

=== 1928-1930: Pasadena college, theatre-in-the-round ===
Following the success of the Pasadena Playhouse, Brown founded the Pasadena Playhouse College of Theatre Arts, a five-story arts college neighboring the Playhouse. In the years since, numerous actors have graduated from the college, including Robert Preston, Charles Bronson, Dana Andrews, Sally Struthers, Morgan Freeman, ZaSu Pitts, Gene Hackman, and Dustin Hoffman.

Brown experimented with numerous theatrical techniques at the Pasadena Playhouse. He created the theatre-in-the-round staging style. The first flexible stage in the United States was located in Brown's living room in Pasadena and functioned as an experimental space for the Playhouse.

=== 1930-1934: Great Depression ===
In the middle of the Great Depression, Brown wrote and published his own article in the September 1935 print of the magazine The High School Thespian (now Dramatics). In it, he stated that, "The theatre is an imperishable need of civilized humanity. It prepares youth for the world. It makes people find themselves and stand upon their own feet. It is the most vital form of expression and important for its influence in helping us to get and hold to lucid views in the midst of shifting ethics." He continued on to say that, "The theatre is not dying. With our intelligent help it will move forward through this readjustment period and go triumphantly on to greater things. The vast popular interest in the little and civic theatre movement is spontaneous assurance that the love of drama is one of the most tenacious emotions in the human makeup."

=== 1934-1960: Later career ===
Despite the continued success of his playhouse, Brown stayed largely out of the spotlight. In an 1934 article, journalist Ramon Romero nicknamed Brown "The Star-Maker of Hollywood". Ramero wrote that "[Brown] makes discoveries for his own productions, producing about twenty-five plays a year; some Broadway successes, others, originals, that later find their way to New York’s Main Stem — but he knows beforehand that the movies will snatch away any discovery he might make. Artistic kidnaping he calls it. And yet he goes right on finding new talent which the cameras sooner or later will gobble up."

Brown worked at the Pasadena Playhouse until his death from a heart attack on 12 January 1960.
