= Wolf Tracks =

Wolf Tracks may refer to:

- Wolf Tracks (1920 film), a 1920 American short Western film starring Hoot Gibson
- Wolf Tracks (1923 film), an American silent western film starring Jack Hoxie
- Wolf Tracks – Best of Los Lobos, an album by Los Lobos released 2006
- Wolftracks, a 1982 album by John Kay & Steppenwolf
- Wolf Tracks, a 2002 composition by Jean-Pascal Beintus, released on the 2003 album Wolf Tracks and Peter and the Wolf
