= Stitch's Great Escape! =

Defunct attraction at the Magic Kingdom

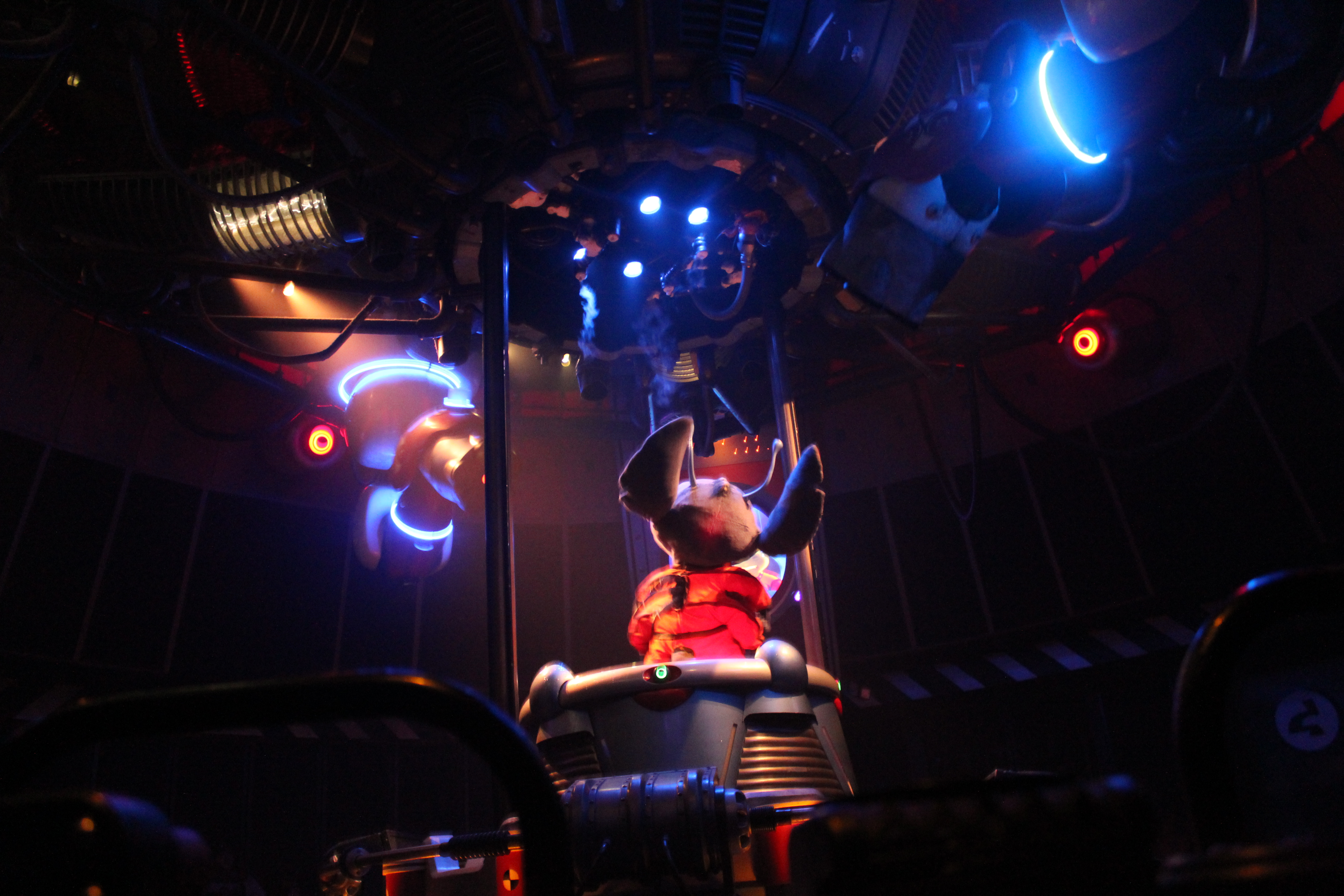
- Stitch in the show theater

Magic Kingdom
- Area: Tomorrowland
- Coordinates: 28.418589°N 81.579744°W
- Status: Removed
- Opening date: November 16, 2004
- Closing date: January 6, 2018 (Note: Last operating date; the attraction was deemed "temporarily closed" by Disney after that date until July 16, 2020, when the company declared that the closure would become permanent.)
- Replaced: Extraterrorestrial Alien Encounter
- Replaced by: Stitch's Alien Encounter Character Greeting!

Ride statistics
- Attraction type: Interactive theater
- Designer: Walt Disney Imagineering
- Theme: Lilo & Stitch
- Audience capacity: 162 per show
- Duration: 17:30, about 3 minutes for the pre-show
- Height restriction: 40 in (102 cm)
- Audio-Animatronics: 5 (three pre-show figures; two Stitch figures, one for each theater)
- Related attraction: Stitch Encounter
- Wheelchair accessible
- Assistive listening available
- Closed captioning available

Stitch's Great Escape! was a "theater-in-the-round" attraction based on Disney's Lilo & Stitch franchise. A non-canon prequel to the original 2002 film that detailed Stitch's "first" prison escape, it was located in the Tomorrowland area of Magic Kingdom at the Walt Disney World Resort, as the fourth attraction to occupy the building and theater space that was previously used for Flight to the Moon, Mission to Mars and the Extraterrorestrial Alien Encounter. Designed by Walt Disney Imagineering, many of the animators who worked on Lilo & Stitch were directly involved with the attraction's development.

The attraction, which struggled with a mixed reception from park guests during its existence, was the only major permanent attraction based on Lilo & Stitch to have operated in the United States; all other such major attractions since (i.e. Stitch Encounter and Tokyo Disneyland's Stitch-themed Enchanted Tiki Room) have been exclusive to non-American Disney Parks resorts. As of 2025, no new major attractions have opened in this attraction's former space, making Stitch's Great Escape! the last attraction to date to have operated in Tomorrowland's northern show building (not including the PeopleMover that runs through the building).

== Voice cast ==
- Chris Sanders as Stitch
- Kevin Michael Richardson as Captain Gantu
- Zoe Caldwell as Grand Councilwoman
- Kevin McDonald as Pleakley
- Richard Kind as Sergeant C4703BK2704-90210
- Dave Fouquettte as Lieutenant Sledge and Donut Guy
- Doug Stone as Ensign Getco
- Debra Jean Rogers as First Officer Ombit
- Jennifer Hale as Cinderella
- Susan Silo as Computer system

== History ==
On September 21, 2003, Magic Kingdom announced that a new Lilo & Stitch themed attraction would be replacing ExtraTERRORestrial Alien Encounter. On October 10, the park announced more details about the new attraction, named Stitch's Great Escape! and would reuse the Alien Encounter technology. Because Alien Encounter was considered too scary and intense for kids, officials wanted to make the new attraction less scary and more family-friendly. Two days later, Alien Encounter closed to the public on October 12 and the Lilo & Stitch remodel was underway.

Stitch's Great Escape! opened on November 16, 2004. During the opening event, a large inflatable Stitch was outside the park's entrance, but as guests reached Main Street, U.S.A., they spotted some signs noticing that Stitch was causing chaos at the park. These signs featured his mugshots and mischievous information. Guests could also find security guards who were looking for Stitch. Even worse, the Cinderella Castle was decorated with toilet paper and a graffiti message that said, "Stitch is King". Cobra Bubbles told guests that Stitch was on the loose. The opening celebration soon began, but Stitch had already taken over the party with Elvis Presley singers. As he was being escorted off the stage, a large group of elementary school students arrived at the scene. They were dressed in Stitch hats and light blue t-shirts. Several guests were also given interviews with Stitch and Cobra Bubbles. Near the World of Disney store over at Disney Springs, then called Downtown Disney, there was a van that was hijacked by Stitch surrounded by police line ribbons and barriers. Inside the van, there were road signs, a travel guide map, shoes, and boxes with toy dinosaurs.

The attraction was met with a mixed reception from guests, as some considered Stitch's Great Escape! a kid-friendly attraction, but others considered it as the worst attraction at Magic Kingdom. The most common complaint was the chili dog burp that made many guests nauseated.

At one time, Stitch's Great Escape! featured a FastPass entrance. When the system was modified to include wristbands instead of tickets, this entrance was removed as the popularity significantly declined.

After October 1, 2016, the attraction entered seasonal operation. In October 2017, the attraction's first pre-show area began being used as a costumed character greeting area for Stitch called Stitch's Alien Encounter Character Greeting!.

=== Closure ===
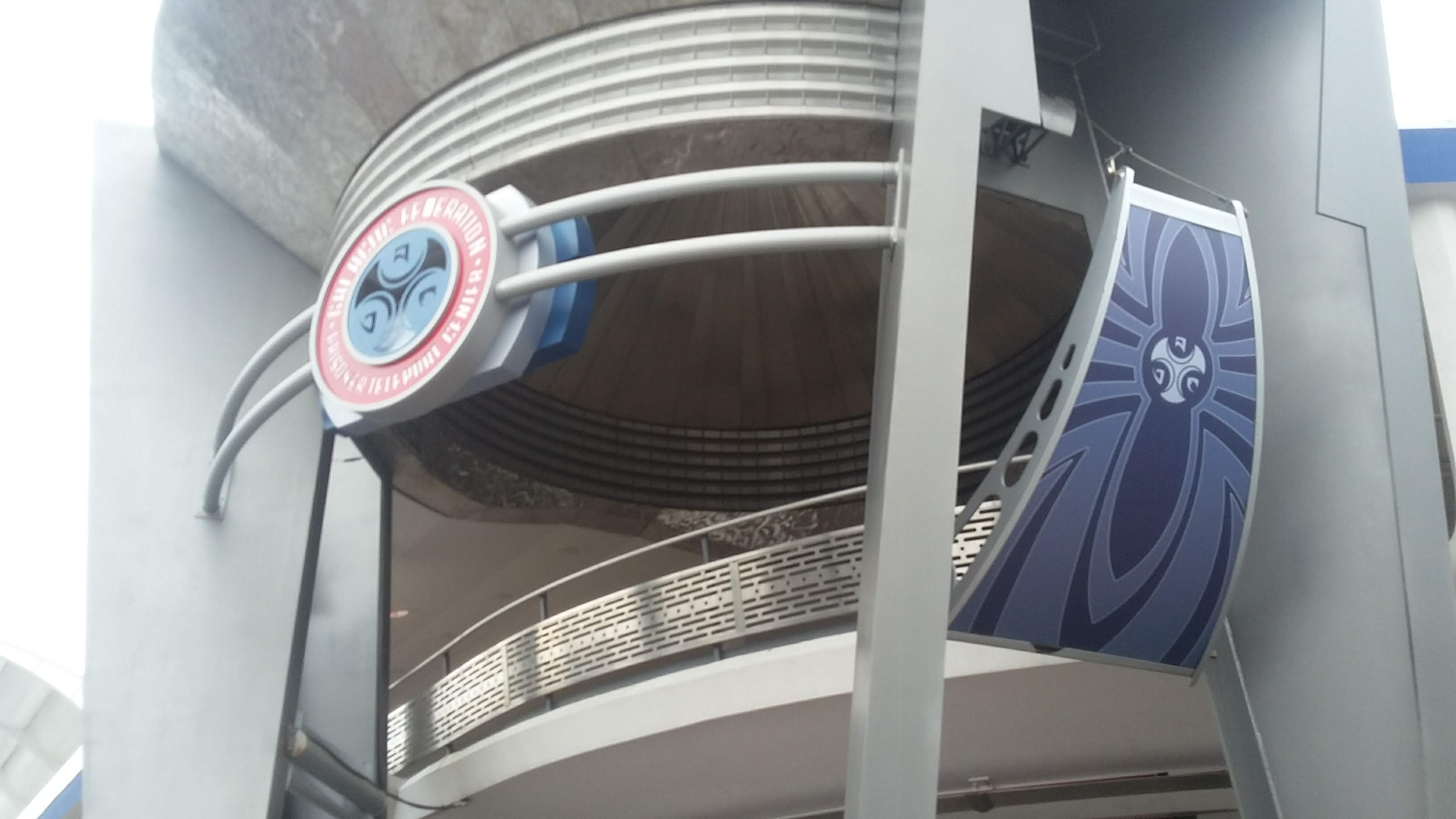
Decoration of the "Galactic Federation Prisoner Teleport Center" featured in the attraction as seen in 2021, three years after the attraction's closure. As of 2024, this is the sole remaining decoration of the attraction's façade left over after its closure.

The attraction last operated on January 6, 2018, which led to speculation about the attraction's fate. The closure of Stitch's Great Escape! was said to be temporary, but in October, the Stitch animatronic and pre-show were completely dismantled. In 2019, the exterior was given a fresh coat of paint. On July 16, 2020, Disney confirmed that the attraction was permanently closed, with the attraction's signage later taken down on August 10, 2020.

== Attraction summary ==
=== Pre-show ===
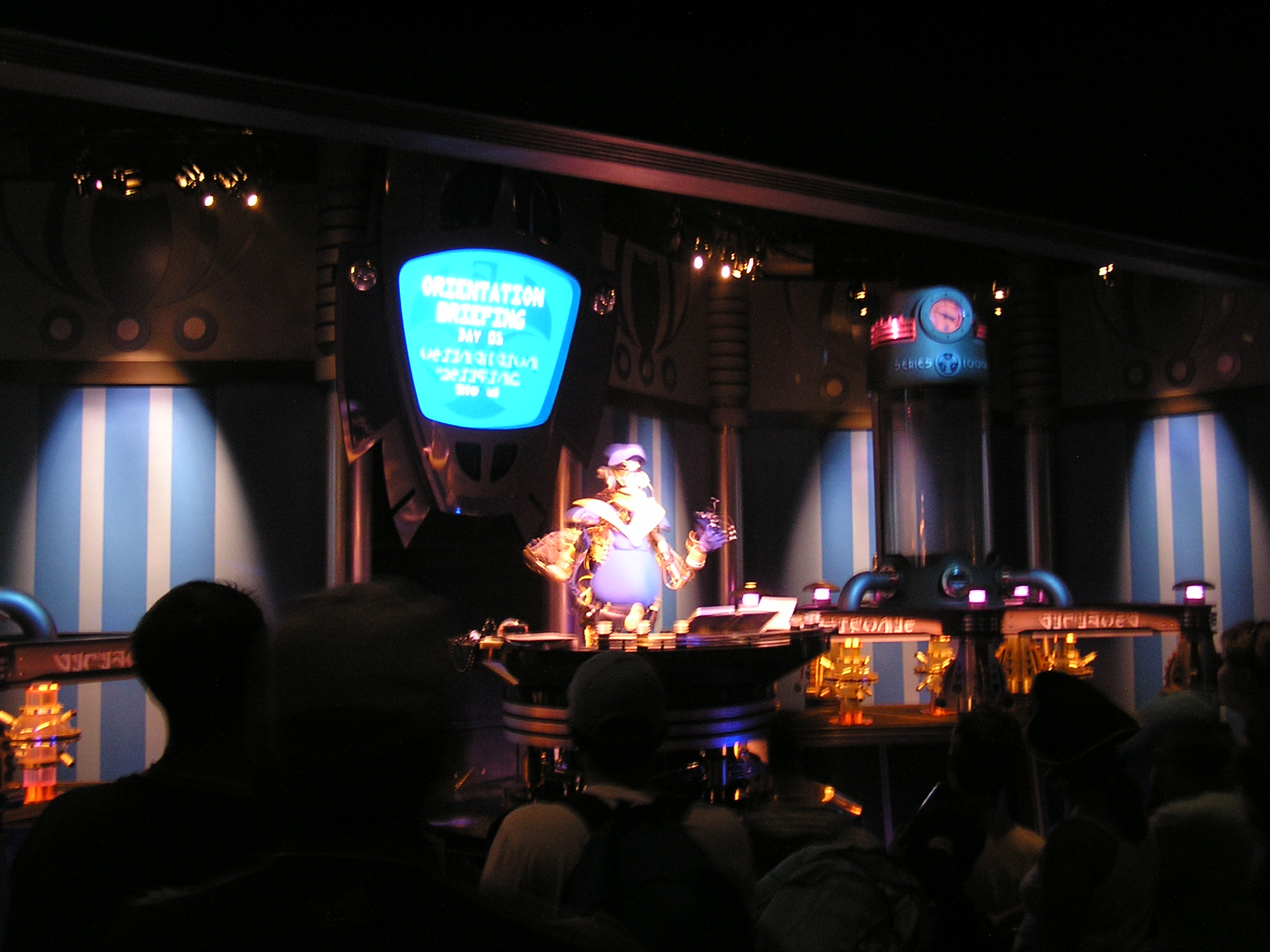
Sgt. 90210 briefs "recruits" (the guests) on prisoners in the Prisoner Teleport Center.

Guests entered the Galactic Federation Prisoner Teleport Center, where the attraction took place. As the doors opened, guests entered the first pre-show. The Grand Councilwoman (voiced by Zoe Caldwell) was shown on the television screens, telling the guests that they would be guards for the United Galactic Federation. After being taught the basic procedures of guard duty, guests entered the second pre-show, where they were introduced by a robot known as Sergeant C4703BK2704-90210 (Richard Kind). He performed a demonstration, explaining the types of prisoners that are incarcerated, ranking from Level 1’s to Level 2’s (intending to start off with Level 1’s) and proceeds to demonstrate the teleportation tubes using an alien named Skippy, who appeared in the former ExtraTERRORestrial Alien Encounter in both normal and "deformed" forms, with the "deformed" form retrofitted in this attraction as a separate character known as the "doughnut guy", allowing both forms to appear at the same time, with Skippy said to be caught jaywalking between the moons of Jupiter. Shortly afterwards, the demonstration was interrupted by Captain Gantu (Kevin Michael Richardson), who gave an alert of a Level 3 (The highest threat level) prisoner being beamed to the center, at which point Sergeant 90210 fainted. Guests were then instructed by Pleakley (Kevin McDonald) over a public-address system to proceed to the High Security Level 3 prisoner teleportation chamber.

=== Main show ===
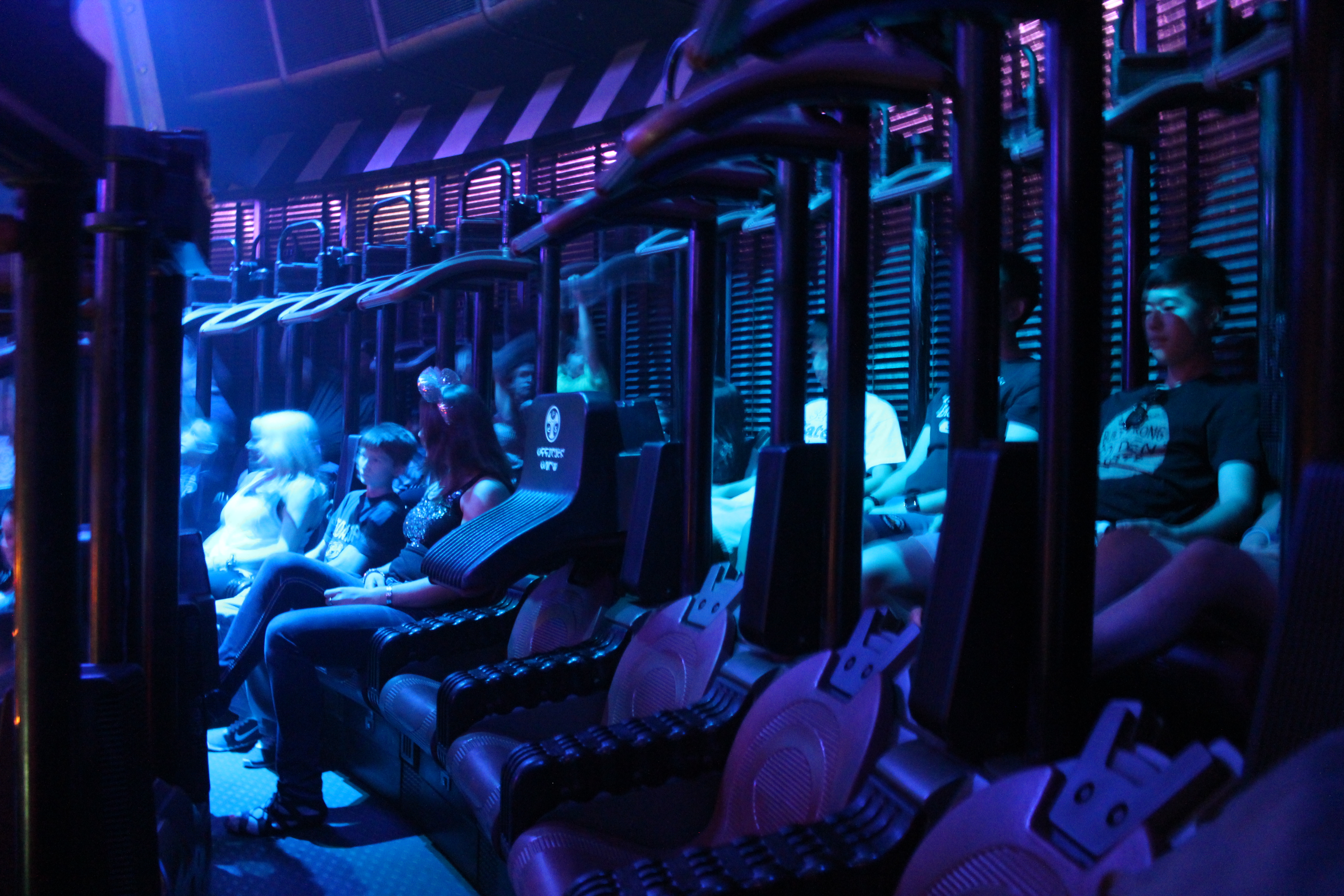
Guests sat in seats with shoulder restraints that lowered onto and rested on their shoulders during the attraction. They were used to simulate Stitch wandering around the theater space in the dark, jumping on the guests and messing with them. The seats themselves were holdovers from the Extraterrorestrial Alien Encounter, the predecessor to Stitch's Great Escape!.

Inside the chamber, guests took a seat, and the shoulder restraints (DNA Scanning Units in the show) lowered into place (to ensure that the tracking cannons above the chamber would not confuse the prisoner's DNA with the guests'). On screens, First Officer Ombit and Ensign Getco would help guests with the demonstration. The prisoner was then beamed into the chamber via a large plume of smoke and was revealed to be Experiment 626 (Chris Sanders) (referring to himself as "Stitch" despite not yet being given the name). Confused by Stitch’s small and cuddly appearance and skeptical of his supposed threat level, Gantu told Ombit, Getco, and the guests to keep an eye on Stitch, while he left to straighten all this out.

Stitch began to spit water in any direction, as Ombit and Getco wondered why the cannons were misfiring. The computer stated that the power was reducing after each spit. Following the second spit, the two realized that Stitch was causing the system to shut down. The third spit lead to the screens powering down. As the computer indicated that power had decreased 80%, the TV screens turned off and smoke effects began to blast. Loud explosions were heard as all the lights in the chamber went out, allowing Stitch to escape. Now in complete darkness, Ombit and Getco told the guests to stay seated and to not let the prisoner out of their sight. As Ombit and Getco went to fix the problem, Stitch destroyed a unseen guest’s cell phone. He began to stalk the guests, sniffing in their ears, and jumping on the shoulder restraints. Guests could hear Stitch scurry around the chamber in the speakers as he smells food. Stitch stole a chili dog from another guest and ate it. Soon afterwards, Stitch unleashed a huge burp, causing a noxious smell to spray into the chamber.

When Gantu returned to the chamber, Ombit and Getco informed him that the prisoner was loose. When the power came back on via emergency power, the laser cannons continued their attempt to bring Stitch down. Again using the cannons' fatal flaws, he managed to fire the laser cannons into the crowd. As the lights and TV screens in the chamber were turned off a second time, Stitch began to leap onto the shoulder restraints and terrorized the guests for a second time while used his antennae to tickle the guests' heads. Then, he reappeared in the teleportation tube and escaped to the Magic Kingdom in Florida. Cameras captured him going into Cinderella Castle where Stitch got into the castle by claiming to be Prince Charming from Cinderella. Off-camera, Cinderella (Jennifer Hale) realized that Stitch was not her prince, and kicked him out of the room. Stitch licked the camera on the screens, making Getco lament that "we've been licked", then Gantu told him to release the guests. The original ending of the attraction had Stitch stalk park guests on Astro Orbiter, with the ending video changing depending on the time of day at the park. This ending was eventually swapped in March 2005. The guests were then released from their restraints and exited into one of two gift shops; Merchant of Venus or Star Traders (previously Mickey's Star Traders during the attraction's run). On the way to the gift shops, guests saw a sign labeled "Days without an escape" and a big number going down, along with "wanted posters" featuring some of Stitch's creator Jumba Jookiba's other genetic experiments.

== Technology ==
The attraction included much of the technology and sets from its predecessor, the ExtraTERRORestrial Alien Encounter, including the comical alien Skippy in the second pre-show area. The two 39-inch Audio-Animatronic Stitch figures built by Imagineering were reportedly one of the most complex creations of their size. Other special effects include binaural sound, simulated laser cannons, and a pungent smell of a chili dog.
