= The Town and the City (album) =

Studio album by Los Lobos
- Released: September 12, 2006
- Studios: CRG Studio, Rowland Heights, California; Sonora Recorders, Los Angeles, California; Big Stink Studio, Hercules, California
- Genres: Chicano rock, roots rock, Latin rock, Tex-Mex, heartland rock
- Length: 54:13
- Label: Hollywood Records
- Producer: Los Lobos

Los Lobos chronology
Wolf Tracks: The Best of Los Lobos (2006)	The Town and the City (2006)	Los Lobos Goes Disney (2009)

Professional ratings
Aggregate scores
Source	Rating
Metacritic	87/100
Review scores
Source	Rating
AllMusic	4.5/5 stars
Blender	3.5/5 stars
The Boston Phoenix	3.5/4 stars
The Guardian	4/5 stars
The Independent	4/5 stars
Los Angeles Times	3.5/4 stars
Mojo	4/5 stars
PopMatters	9/10
Rolling Stone	4/5 stars
Uncut	9/10

The Town and the City is the twelfth studio album released by rock band Los Lobos in 2006, to generally positive critical reception. The title of the album was taken from the debut novel by Jack Kerouac. The album explores themes of longing, disillusionment, and loneliness in the Mexican-American immigration experience.

== Track listing ==
All tracks are written by David Hidalgo and Louie Pérez, except where noted.

No.	Title	Writer(s)	Length
1.	"The Valley"		4:33
2.	"Hold On"		4:30
3.	"The Road to Gila Bend"		4:41
4.	"Chuco's Cumbia"	Cesar Rosas	3:32
5.	"If You Were Only Here Tonight"		2:55
6.	"Luna"	Hidalgo, Pérez, Luis R. Tórres	3:26
7.	"Two Dogs and a Bone"		2:27
8.	"Little Things"		4:49
9.	"The City"		4:20
10.	"Don't Ask Why"		5:25
11.	"No Puedo Más"	Rosas	4:59
12.	"Free Up"	Hidalgo, Pérez, Eddie Gorodetsky	3:47
13.	"The Town"		4:49

== Personnel ==
- David Hidalgo – vocals, guitar, accordion, fiddle, requinto jarocho
- Louie Pérez – vocals, guitar, drums, jarana
- Cesar Rosas – vocals, guitar, bajo xexto
- Conrad Lozano – vocals, bass, guitarron
- Steve Berlin – keyboards, horns

Additional musicians

- Cougar Estrada – drums, percussion

Production

- Los Lobos – producer
- Robert Carranza – engineer, mixing (3, 4, 11, 12)
- Mark Johnson – engineer
- Richard Barron – engineer
- David Hidalgo – engineer
- Jed Burtoft – assistant engineer
- Tchad Blake – mixing (except 3, 4, 11, 12)
- Stephen Marsh – mastering
- Stephanie Villa – mastering assistant
- Louie Perez – art direction
- Al Quattrocchi – art direction
- Jeff Smith – art direction
- David Snow – creative direction
- Tornado Design – design
- Jaime Hernandez – illustration
- James Minchin III – photography

== Charts ==
Chart (2006)	Peak position
Belgian Albums (Ultratop Flanders)	93
Dutch Albums (Album Top 100)	89
US Billboard 200	142
