= Extraterrorestrial Alien Encounter =

Former attraction at Walt Disney World

ExtraTERRORestrial Alien Encounter
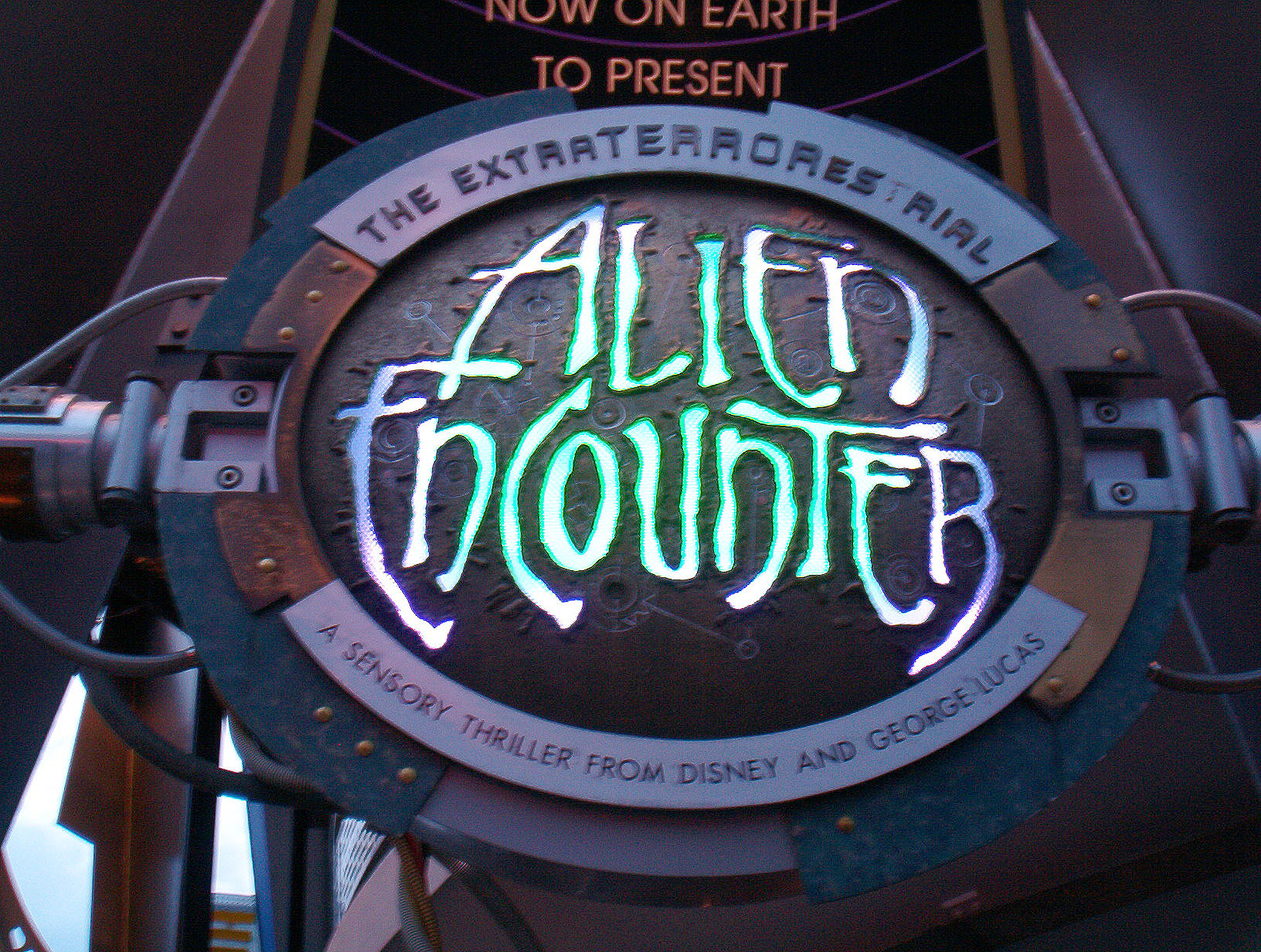
- The entrance sign

Magic Kingdom
- Area: Tomorrowland
- Coordinates: 28°25′07″N 81°34′47″W
- Status: Removed
- Soft opening date: December 16, 1994
- Opening date: June 20, 1995
- Closing date: October 12, 2003
- Replaced: Mission to Mars
- Replaced by: Stitch's Great Escape!

Ride statistics
- Attraction type: Theater-in-the-round experience, haunted attraction
- Designer: Walt Disney Imagineering; Lucasfilm
- Theme: An alien encounter
- Music: Richard Bellis
- Audience capacity: 162 per show
- Duration: 18:00
- Height restriction: 112 cm (3 ft 8 in)
- Pre Show Host: SIR
- Main Show Host: Spinlok and Dr. Femus
- Audio-Animatronics: 3 (pre-show); 2 (1 for each main show)

The Extraterrorestrial Alien Encounter (stylized as ExtraTERRORestrial Alien Encounter) was a "theater-in-the-round" attraction located in the Tomorrowland section of the Magic Kingdom theme park at Walt Disney World Resort. A co-production between Walt Disney Imagineering and Lucasfilm (then separate from The Walt Disney Company), the attraction was a darkly humorous science fiction experience that used binaural sound to achieve many of its effects.

After years of declining popularity and increasing complaints from park guests about its frightening nature, Disney announced on September 21, 2003 that an attraction themed to Disney Animation's 2002 film Lilo & Stitch would be replacing it. On October 12, Extraterrorestrial Alien Encounter was closed to the public to start production on Stitch's Great Escape!.

== History ==
=== Original concept ===
The genesis for Extraterrorestrial Alien Encounter was a proposed attraction inspired by the 1979 film, Alien. The original concept was named Nostromo, a reference to the spacecraft from the film, with the attraction's alien planned to be the titular Xenomorph creature, and X-S Tech was going to be the Weyland-Yutani Corporation. This idea was ultimately deemed inappropriate and thusly scrapped because the Alien series was rated R and this contradicted a general rule-of-thumb that Disney attractions were supposed to be based on either G or PG-rated properties; although, Disney has since developed attractions from franchises that host at least one PG-13 rated film, such as Star Wars, Indiana Jones, Marvel, and Avatar. As a result, the name Nostromo was taken out entirely and an original alien was created for the ride and the fictional company was changed to X-S Tech.

As an original story was developed, George Lucas was brought in to work on the project. This version's storyline had X-S Tech's open house being a front for exposing human guinea pigs to an alien monster they had captured. After the alien menaces the audience for a moment, it is revealed to be sentient and desires to escape its captors and free the guests as well. The X-S scientists respond by trying to destroy the test chamber and leave no evidence, but the alien holds off their weaponry, raises the restraints allowing the guests to escape. While leaving, the sounds of the alien rampaging through the pre-show facilities could be heard. The story's dark tone would lead to it being further re-worked.

=== Development ===
Extraterrorestrial Alien Encounter was proposed for Disneyland for the "Tomorrowland 2055" project as part of the "Disney Decade," started by then-Disney CEO Michael Eisner. It was to be installed in the space that housed the Mission to Mars attraction. Also proposed to join "Tomorrowland 2055" were The Timekeeper, which was to take over Circlevision 360, and also Plectu's Fantastic Intergalactic Revue, a musical revue which was to land where America Sings once was located. Due to financial issues after the opening of Disneyland Paris (then known as Euro Disney), "Tomorrowland 2055" was cancelled.

In late 1993, it was announced that Extraterrorestrial Alien Encounter would be coming to Magic Kingdom.

The attraction opened briefly for previews on December 16, 1994, on the site of the park's former Mission to Mars attraction. It was widely criticized by park guests for its violence, storyline and comedic tone of the pre-show in comparison to the darker tone of the main attraction. On January 12, 1995, the attraction was closed for retooling by Eisner, who felt that it was not intense enough. Disney retooled the original version of the second pre-show and main show and spent an extra $10 million for improvements. The second pre-show was reworked to make it match the dark tone of the main show. Imagineers adjusted the show to make sure guests knew what was happening, and reprogrammed every computer system with each show element. Extraterrorestrial Alien Encounter officially opened on June 20, 1995, as part of the Magic Kingdom's New Tomorrowland renovation.

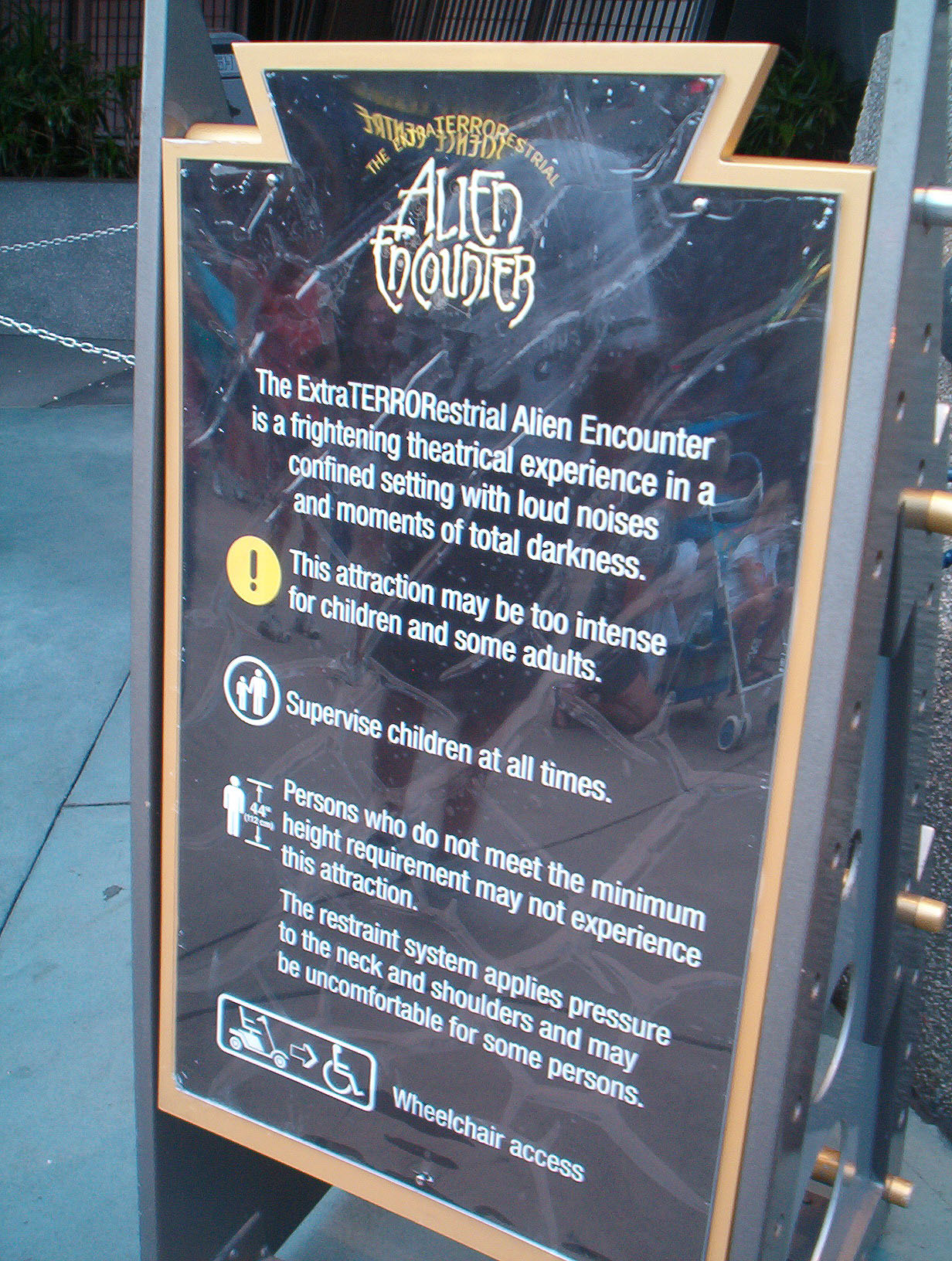
The warning sign

Upon its opening, some Disney fans praised Extraterrorestrial Alien Encounter for its darker tone in contrast to other attractions at Magic Kingdom. However, the attraction was met with largely negative reception from guests, as it was considered too scary for younger kids, and the popularity of the attraction started to dwindle.

The attraction was planned to be added at Disneyland along with an opening at Tokyo Disneyland and Disneyland Paris over the next few years. These plans were cancelled due to the attraction's negative reviews coupled with budget cuts.

On September 21, 2003, Magic Kingdom announced that Extraterrorestrial Alien Encounter would be closing. It was set to be replaced by a new attraction based on Disney Animation's 2002 film Lilo & Stitch. Extraterrorestrial Alien Encounter closed on October 12, 2003, and was replaced by Stitch's Great Escape!, which opened on November 16, 2004 and operated until January 6, 2018, using much of the same technology and set pieces from its predecessor.

== Attraction experience ==
=== First preshow area ===
Guests were ushered into the "Tomorrowland Interplanetary Convention Center" (mentioned as such in the Tomorrowland Transit Authority narration) for a demonstration of new technology from an alien corporation known as X-S Tech. The company's chairman, L.C. Clench (Jeffrey Jones), set the attraction's tone with a pre-show welcome that included his corporate philosophy, "If something can't be done with X-S then it shouldn't be done at all."

Before the start of the pre-show, the television monitors described other events taking place at the Tomorrowland Interplanetary Convention Center, including "The Tomorrowland Chamber of Commerce presents X-S Tech", "Mission to Mars: History or Hoax" (a tribute to the attraction that previously occupied the Alien Encounter building), "Championship Pet Show", and "The Walt Disney Company's Pan Galactic Stock Holders Meeting", featuring a holographic transmission from "Lunar Disneyland—The Happiest Place Off Earth".

=== Second pre-show area ===
Guests proceeded into a second area where they were introduced to an X-S robot known as Simulated Intelligence Robotics (SIR), voiced by Tim Curry. He proceeded to demonstrate the company's teleportation technology using a little alien named Skippy. The creature's charred and disoriented appearance after being teleported a short distance across the room suggested that the technology was flawed. While teleporting Skippy back across the room, SIR paused the process, demonstrating how the technology could be used to suspend subjects in teleportation indefinitely. Originally, the robot was named Technobotic Oratorical Mechanism Series 2000 (TOM 2000) and was voiced by Phil Hartman.

=== Main attraction ===
Finally, guests were seated in harnesses within a circular chamber surrounding an enormous plastic cylinder, the "teleportation tube." Clench and two X-S Tech employees, Spinlok (Kevin Pollak) and Dr. Femus (Kathy Najimy), communicated "live" from across the galaxy via video screens. Initially, a single guest was to be teleported out of the chamber for a meeting with Clench. Instead, Clench decided to have himself teleported into the chamber on Earth to meet the entire group.

Clench's impatience and the change of plans caused the teleportation signal to be diverted through an unknown planet. As a result, a towering, winged and carnivorous alien was beamed into the tube by mistake, as chaos ensued and the technicians panicked. The creature quickly escaped, as intermittent darkness and flashes of light revealed the shattered and empty teleportation tube. A power outage then plunged the chamber into total darkness as guests sat restrained in their seats. A maintenance worker attempted to restore the power, but was mauled as the alien's shrieks resounded throughout the room and a spray of fluid flew out into the audience hitting the guests' faces. After the spray of fluid, the guests felt their seats rumble and shake as the alien made its way swiftly through the crowd, during which time the guests also felt the "breath" of the alien on the back of their necks and drool dripping from its mouth.

The power came back, and with assistance from Spinlok and Dr. Femus, the alien was ultimately driven back into the broken teleportation device, but overpowering the tube caused the alien to explode right before the tube closed. Guests were then released from their seats while the two technicians bid them goodbye and resumed their search for the misplaced Clench. On the way out, guests exited into Merchant of Venus.

== Special effects ==
Unlike its successor Stitch's Great Escape!, much of Alien Encounter took place in total darkness while the attraction engaged guests' nonvisual senses. Most of the effects came from individual units mounted on the shoulder restraints behind audience members' heads. The most common effects were binaural cues which came from the highly separated speakers arranged next to each ear. These speakers bolstered many of the other effects with foley, creating unique effects like positional audio from the monster, and created general atmospherics, including the murmuring and screams of other audience members, pink noise, and heartbeats.

Binaural sound effects and moving shoulder restraints suggest that the alien is moving through the chamber above the audience. When the alien was meant to be traveling on the far side of the room, "several banks of 1,800-watt-per-channel servo-driven subwoofers" repurposed from the previous attraction, Mission to Mars, and transducers mounted in the seats made pounding vibrations meant to simulate the footsteps of a powerful monster. Warm moistened air was used both gently, to simulate the alien breathing down the audience members' necks, and forcefully, to induce a more intense reaction from them. Water sprinklers and air blasters mounted in the row in front were used to simulate the dripping of either the creature's drool or blood from an attacked worker in the scaffolding above the theater (played by a cast member carrying a flashlight using prerecorded dialogue) and to simulate the explosion of the alien in the finale when the blast shield does not close in time. Air blown through soft textile tubes caused them to slap against the back of audience members' heads which, in conjunction with hot air blowers and olfactory emitters, created the most direct physical effect by suggesting the alien was licking audience members.

During lighted segments, the show used lasers, rear-projected screens repurposed from the previous attraction, Mission to Mars, and Audio-Animatronics for the alien, SIR, and Skippy.
