= The Tiki Tiki Tiki Room =

Disney theme song

"The Tiki, Tiki, Tiki Room" is the official song for Walt Disney's Enchanted Tiki Room, an attraction at the Disneyland theme park.

== History ==
The song was written in 1963 by Disney staff songwriters, The Sherman Brothers: Robert B. and Richard M. Sherman, and recorded by The Mellomen. The song's was the first written for an Audio-Animatronic attraction. A studio-recorded soundtrack of the Enchanted Tiki Room was released in 1968 by Disneyland Records as the A side of the album The Enchanted Tiki Room (ST-3966), whose B side included music from the Disney Jungle Cruise attraction.

The song is still heard at the Disneyland's and Walt Disney World Magic Kingdom's Enchanted Tiki Room attractions, as well as Disneyland's Remember... Dreams Come True fireworks show, though the final verse was removed to help shorten the overall length of the attraction. During the years Walt Disney World's The Enchanted Tiki Room (Under New Management) was performed, only the first few seconds of the song were sung.

The song was covered by Hilary Duff for the first DisneyMania album in 2002. It was also covered by Los Lobos on the collection of Disney songs album Los Lobos Goes Disney released in 2009 under the Disney Sound label. In 2008, Disney released Disneymusic Block Party, consisting of Playhouse Disney artists performing Disney songs. The album included a cover of "The Tiki, Tiki, Tiki Room" performed by Wayne Brady. The original recording was used in the soundtrack for the 2011 film Gnomeo & Juliet.
