= The Enchanted Tiki Room: Stitch Presents Aloha e Komo Mai! =

Animatronics show at Tokyo Disneyland

Coordinates: 35.63315°N 139.88238°E

The Enchanted Tiki Room: Stitch Presents Aloha E Komo Mai!
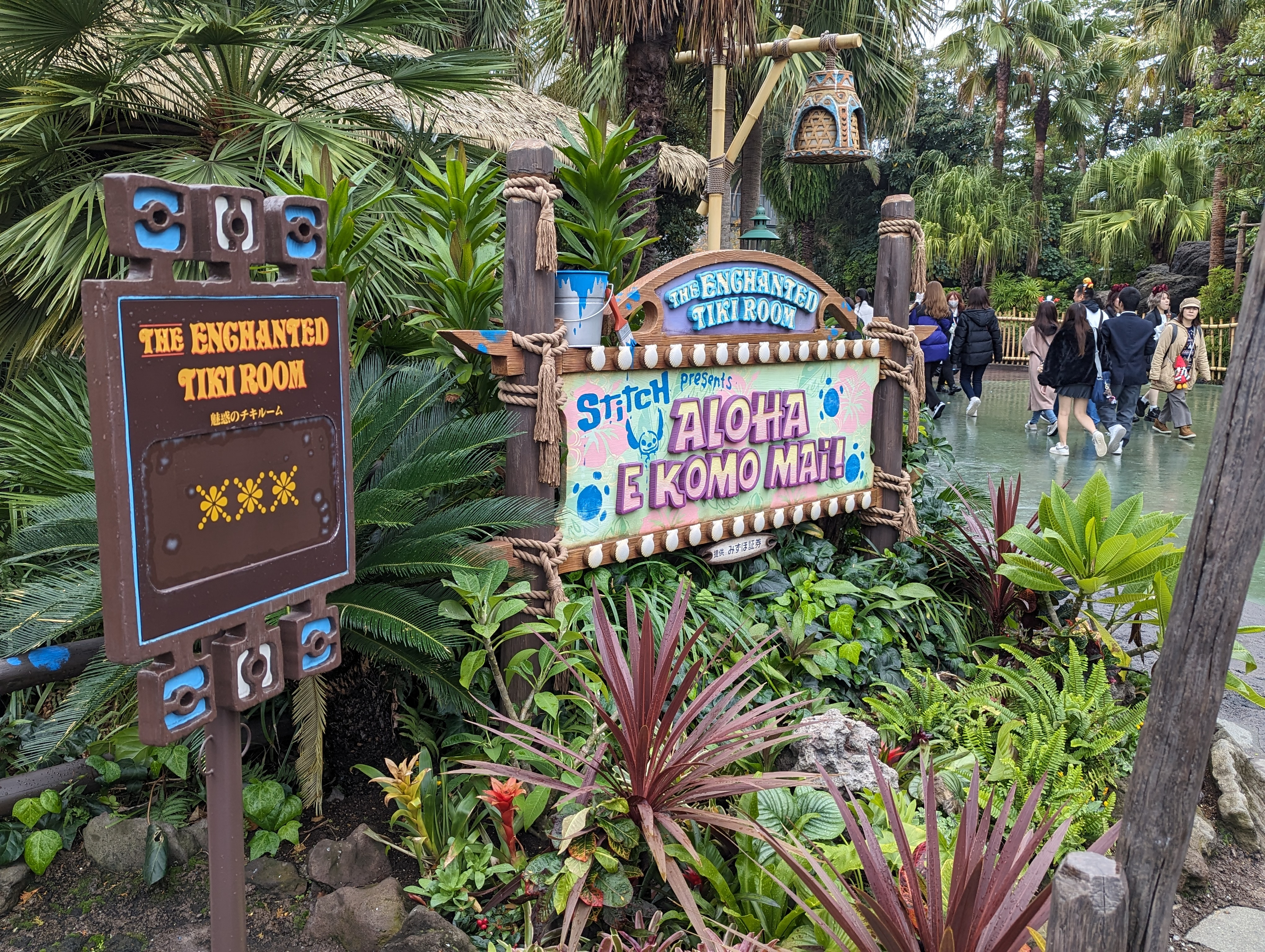
- Signage at the entrance to the attraction

Tokyo Disneyland
- Area: Adventureland
- Status: Operating
- Opening date: July 25, 2008
- Replaced: The Enchanted Tiki Room: Now Playing Get The Fever!

Ride statistics
- Attraction type: Theater-in-the-round audio-animatronic show
- Designer: Walt Disney Imagineering
- Theme: Polynesia; Lilo & Stitch
- Duration: 8 minutes
- Audio-Animatronics: Yes
- Host: Stitch (Koichi Yamadera)
- Sponsor: Mizuho Securities

The Enchanted Tiki Room: Stitch Presents Aloha E Komo Mai! is a theatre in the round Audio-Animatronics show located in Tokyo Disneyland's Adventureland. It is the fourth incarnation of the Enchanted Tiki Room show, the second to be exclusive to Tokyo Disneyland, and the second to involve a character from a Walt Disney Animation Studios film and franchise.

== History ==
The Tiki Room opened in Tokyo Disneyland with the rest of the park on April 15, 1983. It was originally a Japanese version of the original Tiki Room show in Disneyland until June 16, 1999, when it was replaced with a new incarnation called "The Enchanted Tiki Room: Now Playing Get The Fever!" This version featured the Tiki Room in a Las Vegas nightclub setting and removed the four host birds from the original show (José, Michael, Pierre, and Fritz), replacing them with four lounge host birds: Danno, Scats, Buddy, and Lava (the first female host bird). The story involved the birds trying to wake up the sleeping Tiki Gods, which was accomplished by Lava singing "Fever" to them. An English demo track of the show was recorded.

"The Enchanted Tiki Room: Now Playing Get The Fever!" closed on January 27, 2008, and was replaced on July 25, 2008, with a fourth and latest incarnation called “The Enchanted Tiki Room: Stitch Presents Aloha e Komo Mai!”, adding Stitch from the Lilo & Stitch franchise to the show.

== Plot ==
The show begins with the Cast Member introducing the four Birds of Paradise: Manu, Mahina, Waha Nui, and Hau'oli. The birds welcome the audience to the Tiki Room and start off by singing "Hawaiian Roller Coaster Ride" from Lilo & Stitch. Just as they finish the first verse, however, the lights go out, interrupting the song. When the lights come back on, the birds see that someone has written messages and painted pictures all over the walls and windows of the Tiki Room.

Manu suspects that one of the drawings is of the Big Kahuna, the leader of the Enchanted Tiki. If he is angered, they will be doomed. Mahina points out that the messages also say "Aloha e komo mai", which is Hawaiian for "Hello, welcome." Hau'oli is amused that the phrase also happens to be the name of their next song, and Manu wonders how the vandal knew that. Mahina guesses that the Tiki Gods know all, and proceeds to sing "Aloha, E Komo Mai" from Lilo & Stitch: The Series.

At the end of the song, Waha Nui suspects that the Tiki Gods are anxious because they are singing out of tune. The paranoid Manu tells him to watch his words or he could make the Big Kahuna angry. Waha Nui tells him, "Kahuna Matata" and starts the next number, which is part of the "Hawaiian War Chant" from the original Tiki Room show.

However, Stitch disrupts the song by sticking his arms out of the flower beds and sounding various air horns. Waha Nui tries to stop him by shouting at him whenever he reaches out of the flower beds, but Stitch gets the upper hand by sounding a large foghorn blast at the end.

Manu decides to ask the cute birds he met at Waikiki about the Big Kahuna. The girls come down on the Birdmobile, wearing plastic Stitch ears. He asks why they are wearing them, and they tell him that some blue creature put the ears on them. Manu tells them they were lucky and that their bodies could have turned blue, when Stitch throws down blue paint on the girls (this effect is achieved by using a blue light). The girls run off, saying they won't come back until the blue creature leaves.

The lights go out and lightning cracks. Stitch comes out of the fountain in the center of the room, obscured by the low red lighting in the Tiki Room. He pretends to be the Big Kahuna at first, but soon reveals himself. He says he did the things he did so he could be in the show, but the Birds of Paradise scold him, telling him he should have said so before the show started.

They let Stitch perform in the show, on the condition that he not interfere with the show anymore. Stitch agrees, asking the Birds of Paradise and the audience if they want to join his ʻohana. Stitch and the Birds of Paradise then close the show with a reprise of "Aloha, E Komo Mai". Stitch declares "Everyone... ʻohana!" and the show ends with him spitting out of the fountain.

== See also ==
- The Enchanted Tiki Room (Under New Management), which also featured characters from Walt Disney Animation Studios films and franchises
- Walt Disney's Enchanted Tiki Room
