= Wolf Tracks – Best of Los Lobos =

Wolf Tracks: The Best of Los Lobos

Greatest hits album by Los Lobos
- Released: February 14, 2006
- Recorded: 1983–2002
- Genre: Chicano rock Roots rock Tex-Mex; Latin rock Heartland rock Americana
- Length: 68:55
- Label: Rhino
- Producer: Los Lobos; T-Bone Burnett; Steve Berlin; Mitchell Froom; Larry Hirsch; Tchad Blake

Los Lobos chronology
Acoustic En Vivo (2005)	Wolf Tracks: The Best of Los Lobos (2006)	The Town and the City (2006)

Professional ratings
Review scores
Source	Rating
AllMusic	4.5/5 stars
Blender	4/5 stars
PopMatters	9/10

Wolf Tracks: The Best of Los Lobos is the third compilation album by the American rock band Los Lobos, released in 2006 by Rhino Records. It contains twenty tracks originally released between 1983 and 2002, except for the previously unissued album outtake "Border Town Girl".

== Track listing ==
No.	Title	Writer(s)	Original release	Length
1.	"Let's Say Goodnight"	David Hidalgo, Louie Pérez	...And a Time to Dance EP, 1983	2:35
2.	"Anselma"	Cesar Suedan, Guadalupe Trigo	...And a Time to Dance EP	3:10
3.	"Don't Worry Baby"	Cesar Rosas, Perez, T-Bone Burnett	How Will the Wolf Survive?, 1984	2:47
4.	"A Matter Of Time"	Hidalgo, Pérez	How Will the Wolf Survive?	3:49
5.	"Corrido #1"	Rosas	How Will the Wolf Survive?	2:40
6.	"Evangeline"	Hidalgo, Pérez	How Will the Wolf Survive?	2:43
7.	"Will The Wolf Survive?"	Hidalgo, Pérez	How Will the Wolf Survive?	3:43
8.	"One Time One Night"	Hidalgo, Pérez	By the Light of the Moon, 1987	4:48
9.	"Shakin' Shakin' Shakes"	Rosas, Burnett	By the Light of the Moon	4:12
10.	"Set Me Free (Rosa Lee)"	Rosas	By the Light of the Moon	3:39
11.	"Come On, Let's Go"	Ritchie Valens	La Bamba (soundtrack), 1987	2:11
12.	"La Bamba"	Traditional, arr. Valens	La Bamba (soundtrack)	2:55
13.	"Volver, Volver" (Live, 1987)	Fernando Maldonado	Just Another Band from East L.A. – A Collection, 1993	3:47
14.	"La Pistola y El Corazón"	Hidalgo, Pérez	La Pistola y El Corazón, 1988	3:30
15.	"Jenny's Got a Pony"	Hidalgo, Pérez	The Neighborhood, 1990	4:04
16.	"That Train Don't Stop Here"	Rosas, Leroy Preston	Kiko, 1992	3:52
17.	"Kiko and the Lavender Moon"	Hidalgo, Pérez	Kiko	3:37
18.	"Oh Yeah"	Rosas, Pérez	This Time, 1999	3:48
19.	"Good Morning Aztlán"	Hidalgo, Pérez	Good Morning Aztlán, 2002	4:09
20.	"Border Town Girl"	Rosas	from The Neighborhood sessions; previously unissued	2:56

== Personnel ==
Credits adapted from the album's liner notes.

Los Lobos

- David Hidalgo – vocals, electric and acoustic guitar, accordion, violin, banjo, 6-string bass, piano, drums, percussion
- Cesar Rosas – vocals, electric and acoustic guitar, mandolin
- Louie Pérez – drums, percussion, guitar, fraustophone, vocals
- Conrad Lozano – electric and acoustic bass, fretless bass, vocals
- Steve Berlin – saxophone, flute, harmonica, melodica, organ, piano, clavinet, synthesizer, percussion

Additional musicians

- T-Bone Burnett – acoustic guitar, organ (3–7), vocals (8–10)
- Alex Acuña – percussion (3–10, 16, 17)
- Mitchell Froom – keyboards (8–10, 16–18)
- Mickey Curry – drums (8–10, 12)
- Anton Fier – drums (8–10)
- Ron Tutt – drums (8–10)
- John Hiatt – vocals (8)
- Jim Keltner – drums, percussion (15, 20)
- Pete Thomas – drums (16–19)
- Victor Bisetti – percussion (16–18)

Production

- T-Bone Burnett – producer (1–10)
- Steve Berlin – producer (1–7, 11), discographical annotation (liner notes)
- Mitchell Froom – producer (12, 16–18)
- Los Lobos – producer (8–10, 14–20), executive producer
- Larry Hirsch – producer (15, 20)
- Tchad Blake – producer (18)
- Keith Keller – engineer (13)
- James Austin – compilation producer, liner notes
- Chris Tetzeli – executive producer
- Bill Inglot – sound producer, remastering
- Dan Hersch – remastering
- Matt Abels – product manager
- Gary Peterson – discographical annotation (liner notes)
- Cory Frye – editorial supervision
- Masaki Koike – art direction
- Robert Sebree – cover photography
- Chris Morris – liner notes
