= The Enchanted Tiki Room (Under New Management) =

Defunct Magic Kingdom attraction

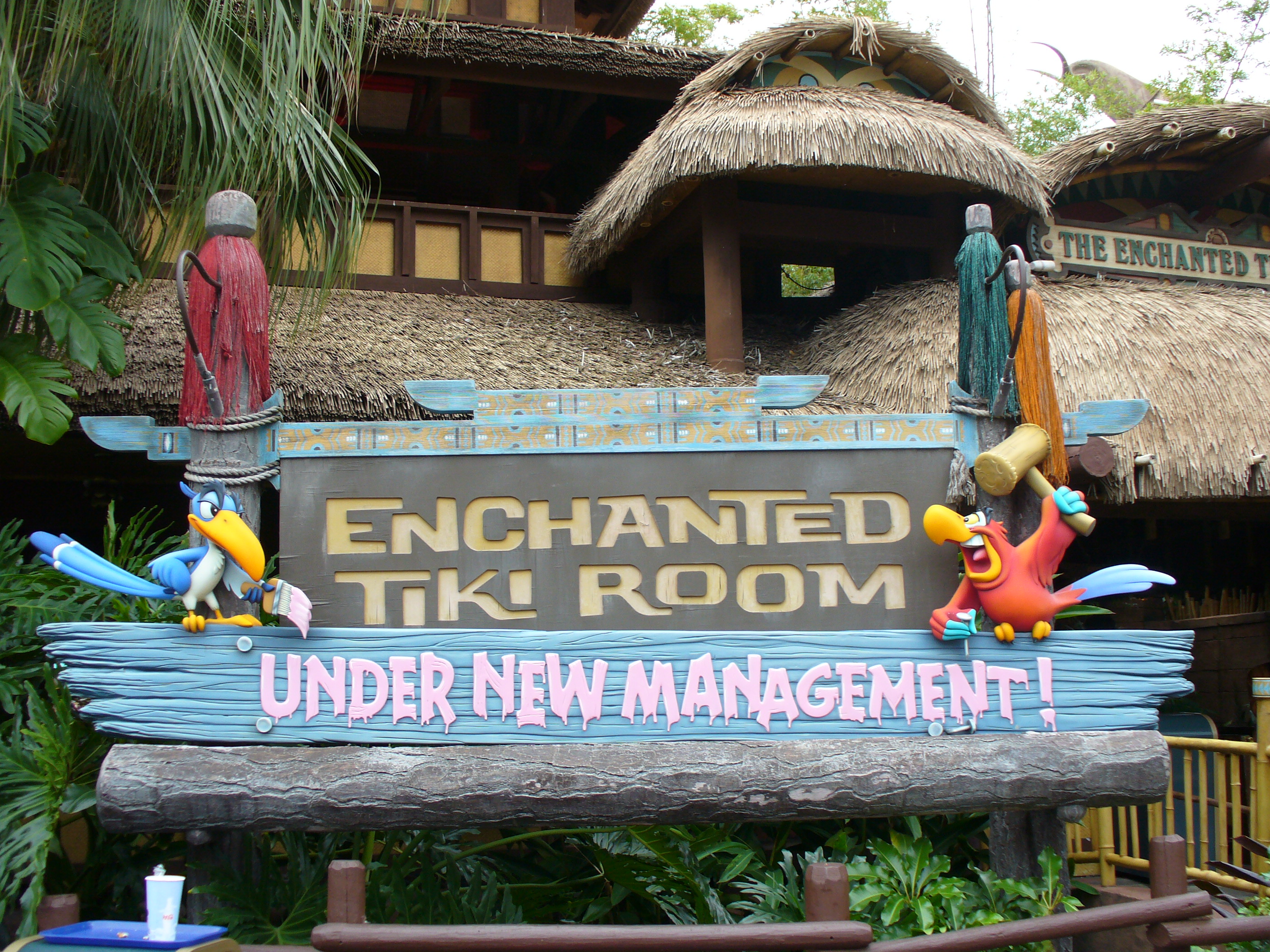

Magic Kingdom
- Area: Adventureland
- Coordinates: 28.41835°N 81.5839°W
- Status: Removed
- Opening date: April 5, 1998
- Closing date: January 12, 2011
- Replaced: Tropical Serenade (1971–1997)
- Replaced by: Walt Disney's Enchanted Tiki Room (2011–present)

Ride statistics
- Attraction type: Audio-Animatronic Theater show
- Designer: Walt Disney Imagineering
- Theme: Tropical bird's musical show
- Duration: 10:00
- Host: Iago (Gilbert Gottfried) and Zazu (Michael Gough)
- Audio-Animatronics: 225
- Wheelchair accessible
- Assistive listening available
- Closed captioning available

The Enchanted Tiki Room (Under New Management) was an attraction located in the Magic Kingdom theme park at the Walt Disney World Resort. It was an updated version of Walt Disney's Enchanted Tiki Room, which was previously known in the Florida park as Tropical Serenade, that featured the bird characters Iago and Zazu from the respective Walt Disney Animation Studios franchises Aladdin and The Lion King. The attraction ran for almost thirteen years from April 1998 until January 2011, when a small fire damaged it, leading Disney to restore the original Enchanted Tiki Room to Florida.

== History ==
The Enchanted Tiki Room show from Disneyland opened in the Magic Kingdom on October 1, 1971, as Tropical Serenade. The show was an exact duplicate of the Disneyland attraction, but instead of the pre-show there was a waterfall in place of the Tiki gods, which opened and two Audio-Animatronic toucans entertained guests. The show was sponsored by Florida Citrus Growers until 1986.

The show closed on September 1, 1997, for renovations and updating. It reopened on April 5, 1998, as The Enchanted Tiki Room: Under New Management, featuring Iago (voiced by Gilbert Gottfried) and Zazu (voiced by Michael Gough) from Aladdin and The Lion King, respectively, as the new owners of the Tiki Room. The show featured all of the same audio-animatronic birds, flowers, and Tiki gods, but now included Iago and Zazu, plus a new evil Tiki goddess named Uh-Oa, who disrupts the usual Enchanted Tiki Room storyline after Iago upsets her. In total, the show used 225 Audio-Animatronics.

On January 12, 2011, a small fire broke out in the attic of the attraction. It was rumored that the Iago figure that first interrupts the show was severely damaged by the small blaze, but the cause of the fire and the extent of the damage was kept quiet while under investigation. Other show elements experienced minor damage when the sprinkler system went off to extinguish the flames. No guests were injured in the incident.

The original attraction reopened on August 15, 2011, as "Walt Disney's Enchanted Tiki Room", an edited and trimmed version of the original show, featuring all but one of the songs from the original 1963 version of the show.

== Storyline ==
As guests were waiting outside the Enchanted Tiki Room, a cylinder-shaped tube opened behind a waterfall to reveal two audio-animatronic toucans — William (voiced by Don Rickles) and Morris (voiced by Phil Hartman). William and Morris entertained the waiting guests by discussing their positions as agents of the new Tiki Room's new "co-owners". A cast member then told the birds that they were preparing to let the guests in. William and Morris were incensed because their clients were not yet in the theater. Morris said that he had to leave because he was about to sign Donald Duck, while William bragged that he had got the Mighty Ducks. The cylinder closed with the two birds yelling and arguing.

After the guests had entered the theater, the cast member proceeded to "wake up" José with help from the audience. The four Tiki Bird hosts- José, Michael, Pierre and Fritz (voiced by Wally Boag, Fulton Burley, Jerry Orbach and Thurl Ravenscroft, respectively) got ready as they did in the original show. They started singing "The Tiki Tiki Tiki Room" as they had for the last 30 years, but in the middle of their song, an audio-animatronic Iago, the parrot from Disney's Aladdin, descended from a hole in the ceiling.

Iago sat on a pillow holding a small megaphone, yelling that the Tiki Birds needed to stop the music. Iago complained that the show's outdated songs made him want to "toss his crackers." The birds said that they were in the middle of a show. From another hole in the ceiling came a perch bearing an audio-animatronic Zazu, the hornbill from Disney's The Lion King. Zazu pleaded with Iago not to toy with the Tiki Room. Pierre told Iago that "his friend" was right and that he should not anger the Room's inhabitants. Iago ignored Zazu's warnings and replied that Zazu wasn't his friend.

José, Michael, Piere and Fritz were confused — they didn't know who Iago and Zazu were because they never "flew to the movies", considering that they didn't get out much as they were rather "attached to the place". But Iago warned them not to get "too attached", as both he and Zazu were the new owners, shocking the birds, and, to give them an example of how the songs should be sung, he began singing a song to the tune of "Friend Like Me" from Aladdin. He said that since the Tiki Birds were ancient history and he was a big "cele-birdy," he was going to change the show so that a more modern audience could appreciate it, warning the birds that they'd better get hip or their audience would disappear forever.

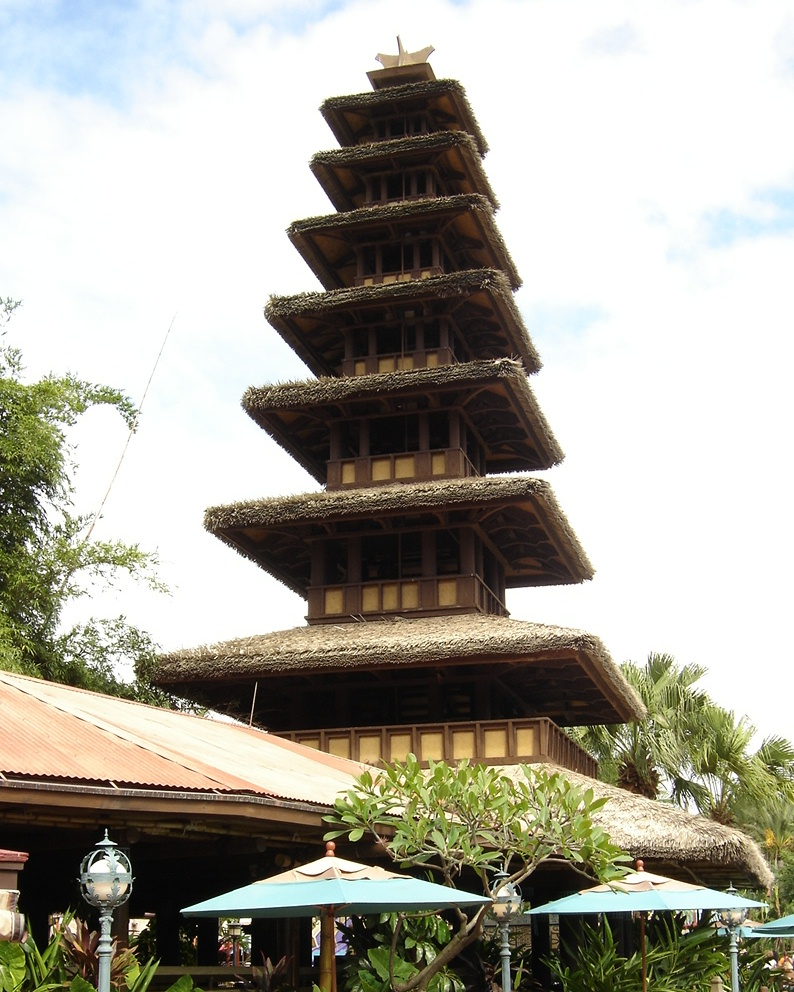
Exterior of the attraction

Zazu told Iago to stop — the Tiki Gods could hear him. Iago then began to blatantly insult the Gods, soon after which "lightning" struck and the lights went out. The Tiki Birds began singing that the atmosphere in the theater had suddenly gotten "Hot Hot Hot" and the carved faces on the Tiki Poles began chanting "Uh-Oa!"

From the center of the fountain in the middle of the room, smoke bubbled and fumed and Uh-Oa, the green and evil audio-animatronic "Tiki Goddess of Disaster" (voiced by Armelia McQueen), emerged. Uh-Oa wanted to know who dared to defame the Tiki Gods and Zazu told her it was Iago. Uh-Oa then sang about how unwise Iago was to have messed with her. She claimed that he "could't fly away because [he was] stuck, [she] had cursed [him] for pushing [his] luck and it would't help to yell — [he was] under [her] spell!" Uh-Oa then used her magic Tiki powers and Iago shot up from his perch. In a big, dark explosion of smoke, the loud-mouthed parrot was gone. Uh-Oa laughed evilly, then, in a cloud of smoke, disappeared back into the fountain.

The Tiki Birds and Zazu felt that they should let the Tiki Gods have their say and Zazu introduced the one and only musical sensation: The Tiki Gods. The faces on the Tiki Poles began to sing "In the Still of the Night" by The Five Satins, then the flowers joined in by singing a rap song using lyrics from the original Tiki Room show and some of the birds began singing along. At this point, over the exit doors, a small compartment on the wall opened. And who else should be in the compartment but Iago. Iago was burnt, smoking, carrying a crutch, and had bandages all over his body. He told them all how the Tiki Gods were the greatest act he had ever heard and that they were going to make a gold mine on this show, no more worries.

Zazu told Iago that where he came from, no worries was referred to as "Hakuna Matata," which Iago misinterpreted as "Hunky-Tuna Tostada". However, he seemed to like it, declaring that Zazu was now his friend and that they should party. All the birds started to sing their own rendition of "Conga" as the Bird Mobile descended from the ceiling. Zazu sang about how Iago learned his lesson and would no doubt be more discreet in the future. Iago decided to show Zazu that he would't be discreet, telling everybody to get on their feet. "That's right — everybody stand up!"

As the audience prepared to leave, the Tiki Birds began singing "Get on Your Feet" by Gloria Estefan. The birds declared that they were going to do a magic trick and make the audience face the door and disappear. The exit doors opened and the guests started walking out as the Tiki Birds continued to sing "Get On Your Feet", followed by "Heigh-Ho". Zazu bid farewell to the guests, while Iago kept up a barrage of comments and insults designed to get the guests to leave as they walked under him. Once the majority of the guests had left the theater, Iago said that he was tired and planned to go take a nap in the Hall of Presidents. He then said good-bye to Zazu, turned around and entered the compartment over the exit. As Fritz cheered in German, José commented that "no one laid an egg but me."

== Reception ==
The Enchanted Tiki Room: Under New Management was met with mixed reception from guests, as some had called it "disrespectful" to the classic attraction. One park goer was quoted saying "they ruined it". Many found it peculiar that the once calming attraction was replaced with a "jarring and cynical" take from Iago from Aladdin. Some reviewers called the jokes dated and crass as well. Following the show's closure and return to the original, Under New Management has been considered by some as one of the worst attraction replacements to Magic Kingdom.

== See also ==
- 2011 in amusement parks
- The Enchanted Tiki Room: Stitch Presents Aloha e Komo Mai!, another version of the attraction that features a character from a Walt Disney Animation Studios film and franchise
