= Theatre in the Round Players =

Minneapolis community theatre

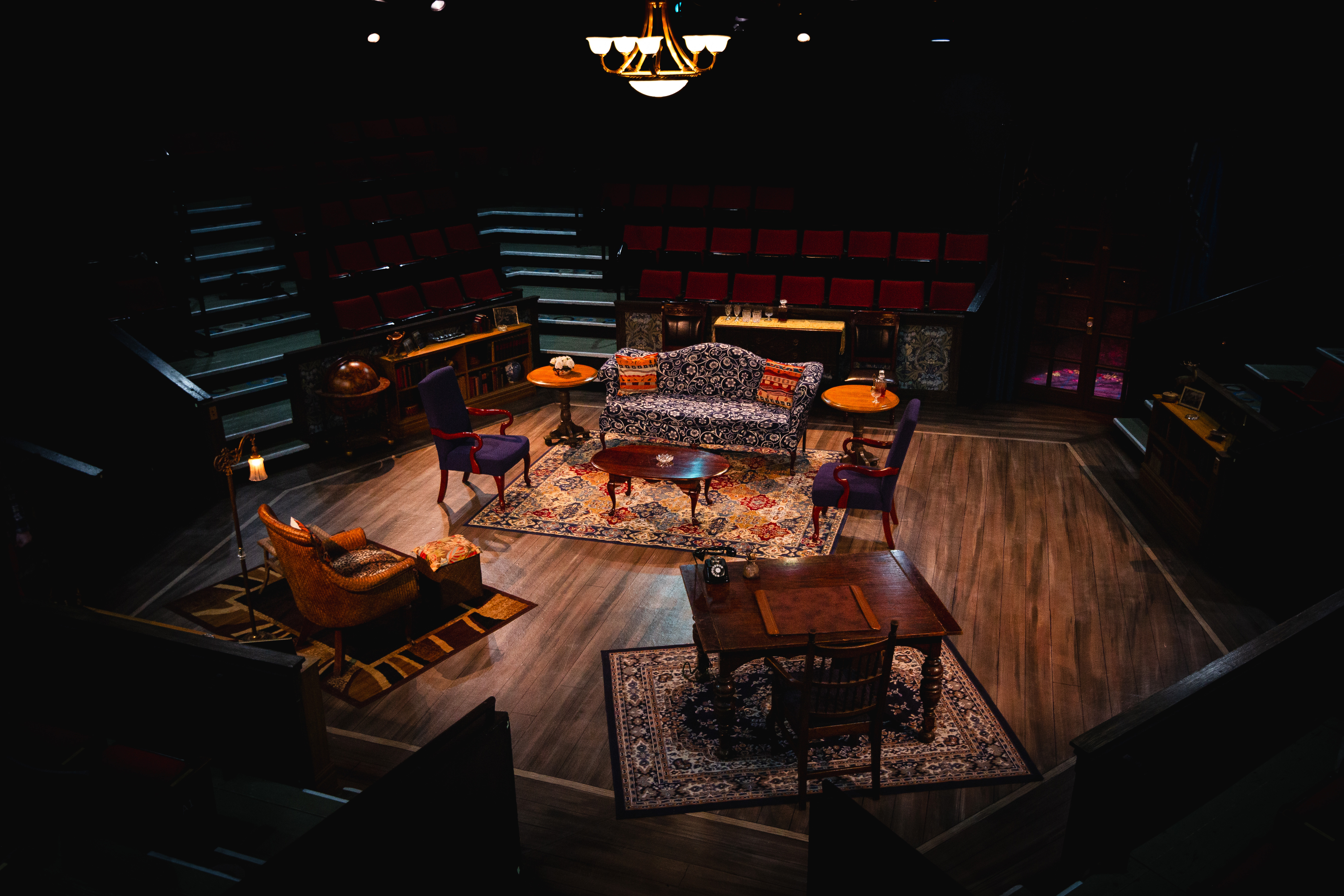
Theatre in the Round's stage during the run of The Unexpected Guest by Agatha Christie.

Theatre in the Round Players (TRP) is a community theatre performing in the West Bank Theater District in Minneapolis. In existence since 1953, it is the longest-running theatre in Minneapolis, and the second-oldest (non-academic) theatre in the Twin Cities. Since 1969 it has performed in its own (purchased in the late 1988) 287-seat arena stage in with the audience surrounds the stage. TRP continues its work of supporting the theatre community today, in ongoing partnerships with the University of Minnesota Theater and others, providing a training ground for theater professionals in training. In 2018, TRP's Jeeves in Bloom was its 550th mainstage production.

== History ==
Seven founding members of Theatre in the Round Players (TRP) decided to continue to work together, when their previous theater - the Circle Theater - closed in 1951. They were joined by Frederick Hilgendorf, a high-school teacher and community theatre director from Wisconsin, and on January 15, 1953 their first production opened in the YWCA at 12th and Nicollet in downtown Minneapolis - called Life with Father. They started out by selling inexpensive annual subscriptions to members, to create a budget for that year's production. That practice was copied by many other community theaters around the country.

They moved in 1961 and then in 1963, to a more stable location on Stevens Avenue, where the Minneapolis Convention Center is now located. In 1969 they moved in to their current location on the West Bank, rebuilding and renovating it to meet their needs. (Note: Mike Steele (1970),"This was, by the way, the final play of the Theatre in the Round’s first season in its West Bank home. It’s been an astoundingly gratifying season with the general caliber of the work very high, very imaginative and much more expansive than it was in the old house".) Their presence on the West Bank, along with Mixed Blood Theatre, Dudley Riggs, and other smaller groups working at the Southern Theater and other spaces, helped re-invigorate the West Bank as a theater-entertainment destination.

During the experimental days of the 1960s, their collaboration with the University of Minnesota Theatre began with the University of Minnesota’s Office of Advanced Drama Research. Together they created a 'Playwrights' Laboratory' to develop new works. The Minnesota State Arts Board also provided a grant in the late 1960s for TRP to tour Minnesota to help communities develop their own theater groups. (Note: Austin, MN (1968): "In addition to the production, the company (TRP) will offer special afternoon workshops to interested local community theatre enthusiasts before the performance in the areas of organization and management, play selection, arena staging and technical production".) In 1969 TRP started a summer series of original plays by new playwrights, and the next year they produced two plays by Joseph Praml (Joe Praml), The Pearl and The Money Man, which were awarded the 1968 McKnight Humanities Award for Shorter Drama.

In 1973, TRP co-founded the Minnesota Association of Community Theatre (MACT), with funding from the Minnesota State Arts Council.

After Frederick Hilgendorf - first artistic director - retired in 1963, TRP initially relied on its member-directors for guidance. Over time, that evolved into the work of the play-selection committee, composed of members of its board of directors as well as the theater community. After being chosen to guide a play, the director is given artistic control to the greatest extent possible. TRP focuses on supporting not only those new directors, but new actors, designers, and audience members as well - to build up the theater community.

== Community Theater ==
While maintaining high standards, TRP is a community theater.

Partnership with the University of Minnesota has been a defining feature of TRP's work. Charles Nolte, stage and screen actor who earned his doctorate at the U in 1966 and taught there through the 1990s, also directed more than a dozen TRP productions. Penumbra Theatre co-founder Lou Bellamy also directed at TRP early in his career.

TRP also provided classes to preschool and elementary age children, in conjunction with the University of Minnesota Continuing Education in the Arts.

Theater in the Round Players has followed a path supported by the classics, allowing for careful additions of new works - both american and international. Some of those new works debuted by TRP include C.P. Taylor's Good, Christopher Durang's The Marriage of Bette and Boo, Eduardo de Filippo's Filumena, George Bernard Shaw's The Philanderer, and Ronald Millar's Abelard and Heloise, as well as the riskier A Day in the Death of Joe Egg by Peter Nichols, Equus by Peter Shaffer and The Great White Hope by Howard Sackler. As of May 2024, TRP's most recent world premier was The Secret of Chimney Manor, written by Todd Olson as a new adaptation of Agatha Christie's mystery novel The Secret of Chimneys. The show opened November 17, 2023.

== See also ==
- Theatre in the round
