= Walt Disney's Enchanted Tiki Room =

Attraction at Disney theme parks

- Attraction poster

Disneyland
- Area: Adventureland
- Coordinates: 33.8117°N 117.9196°W
- Status: Operating
- Opening date: June 23, 1963

Magic Kingdom
- Area: Adventureland
- Coordinates: 28.41835°N 81.5839°W
- Status: Operating
- Opening date: October 1, 1971 (as Tropical Serenade); August 15, 2011 (reopening)
- Closing date: September 1, 1997 (as Tropical Serenade)
- Replaced by: The Enchanted Tiki Room (Under New Management) (1998–2011)

Tokyo Disneyland
- Name: The Enchanted Tiki Room
- Area: Adventureland
- Coordinates: 35.63315°N 139.88238°E
- Status: Removed
- Opening date: April 15, 1983
- Closing date: June 16, 1999
- Replaced by: The Enchanted Tiki Room: Now Playing "Get the Fever!

Ride statistics
- Attraction type: Theater in the round featuring audio-animatronic characters
- Designer: WED Enterprises
- Theme: Polynesia
- Music: The Tiki, Tiki, Tiki Room written by the Sherman Brothers (music & lyrics)
- Duration: 15:36
- Show hosts: José (Wally Boag); Michael (Fulton Burley); Pierre (Ernie Newton); Fritz (Thurl Ravenscroft)
- Audio-Animatronics: About 150
- Sponsors: Disneyland United Airlines (1963–1976); Dole Foods (1976–present); Walt Disney World Florida Citrus Growers (1971–1986); Tokyo Disneyland Shinko Securities Co., Ltd.
- Wheelchair accessible
- Closed captioning available

Walt Disney's Enchanted Tiki Room is an attraction located in Disneyland at the Disneyland Resort and in Magic Kingdom at Walt Disney World, and previously in Tokyo Disneyland at Tokyo Disney Resort. First opened on June 23, 1963, at the Disneyland Resort, the attraction is a pseudo-Polynesian musical Audio-Animatronic show drawing from American tiki culture.

The Floridian version of this attraction, which was identical but with a different pre-show, was known as Tropical Serenade until 1998, when it was replaced with an updated version of the attraction called The Enchanted Tiki Room (Under New Management), featuring Iago and Zazu from Disney Animation's Aladdin (1992) and The Lion King (1994), respectively. That version operated until 2011, when it was damaged by a fire, which led to Disney reintroducing an edited version of the original Walt Disney attraction to replace it. The Japanese version of this attraction operated until 1999, when it was first redeveloped into a nightclub-style version of the show called The Enchanted Tiki Room Presents: Get the Fever!, before it was redeveloped again as The Enchanted Tiki Room: Stitch Presents Aloha e Komo Mai!, partially themed to Disney Animation's Lilo & Stitch franchise.

== Disneyland ==
=== History ===
The attraction opened June 23, 1963, and was the first to feature Audio-Animatronics technology, a WED Enterprises patented invention. The attraction was sponsored by United Airlines for its first 12 years; in 1976, sponsorship passed over to Hawaii's Dole Food Company, which remains the sponsor to the present day. Dole also provides the unique Dole Whip soft-serve frozen dessert sold at a snack bar near the entrance.

The show was originally going to be a restaurant featuring Audio-Animatronics birds serenading guests as they dined. The "magic fountain" at the room's center was originally planned as a coffee station (there is still a storage compartment in its base). The restaurant would have shared its kitchen with the now-defunct Tahitian Terrace in Adventureland and the Plaza Pavilion restaurant at the corner of Main Street, U.S.A., since all three are actually part of the same building. Because ownership of the attraction was separate from the rest of the park, a nominal admission charge of $0.75 was levied. Because computers generate significant heat (particularly in their earliest forms) and played a central role in the attraction, the Tiki Room was also Disneyland's first fully air-conditioned building.

It houses a Hawaiian-themed musical show "hosted" by four lifelike macaws whose plumage matches the flags of their implied countries of origin. "José" is red, white, and green and speaks with a Mexican accent voiced by Wally Boag. "Michael" is white and green with an Irish brogue voiced by Fulton Burley. "Pierre" is blue, white, and red and has a French accent voiced by Ernie Newton. Red, black and white "Fritz" has a German accent provided by Thurl Ravenscroft. Controversy over the use of nationalism-associated white rather than gold/yellow has led counter-antisemitic groups to press for a change in Fritz's color, a change of the character to a representative of another nation, or a wholesale abandonment of the national-representative theme of flag-based color schemes and stereotyped accents. (Note: Ravenscroft also voices Māori god Tangaroa near the attraction's entrance.)

The main birds have changed colors over the years. In 1965, the four host birds had almost identical plumage of white, green, yellow and blue. The four macaws and the other birds are plumed with real feathers, with the exception of chest plumage. The chests are covered in custom-woven cashmere which allows the figures to "breathe" in a lifelike manner. The choice came quite by accident; in a planning meeting, Harriet Burns noticed a cashmere sweater that Walt Disney was wearing which moved at the elbows exactly the way the engineers envisioned.

=== Description ===
The presentation features a "cast" of over 150 talking, singing and dancing birds, flowers, the aforementioned magic fountain, tiki drummers and tiki totem poles that perform the attraction's signature tunes, "The Tiki Tiki Tiki Room" by the Sherman Brothers and "Let's All Sing Like the Birdies Sing". The finale has every Audio-Animatronics figure performing a rousing version of "Hawaiian War Chant". The exit music diverges from the quasi-tropical theme: namely, an arrangement of "Heigh-Ho" from Snow White and the Seven Dwarfs with lyrics thanking guests for watching the show and hurrying them to the exit.

So innovative was the technology by 1963 standards that an Audio-Animatronics talking "barker" bird (Juan, cousin of José) once located near the walkway to beckon visitors inside, drew enormous crowds of visitors trying to catch a glimpse of it. While waiting outside in a lanai area for the show to start, visitors are serenaded by Hawaiian music which at one time included that of Martin Denny and Bud Tutmarc.

Polynesian gods are represented as well around the perimeter of the lanai, each with a rhyming legend to tell via Audio-Animatronics. Some of the gods depicted are Hina Kuluua, goddess of rain; Rongo, god of agriculture; Maui, who roped the playful sun; and Tangaroa, father of all gods and goddesses. A brief documentary of the history of the pineapple is presented as well. The story, filmed in the early 1960s and updated at the end with a Macromedia Flash presentation of a parade of Dole products, is shown on a screen on the rear of the roof of the Dole snack bar at the entrance to the lanai. In the main show, one chorus of "Let's All Sing Like the Birdies Sing" has José crooning like Bing Crosby, Fritz scat-singing in a gravelly voice like that of Louis Armstrong, and Pierre singing like Maurice Chevalier. After this, the birds cue a sing-along from the audience, and then a whistle-along, set to a wild can-can setting of the tune.

By the mid-1990s, the Enchanted Tiki Room audio system was dramatically enhanced. Subwoofers were placed in the back rows. Modern mid-range speakers and high-range tweeters were placed throughout the room. For the first time, every instrument played in the 1963 recording could be heard clearly. Soon after, the attraction received another alteration: Nearly four minutes of the original 17-minute show were removed: a verse of "The Tiki Tiki Tiki Room", a whistling verse of "Let's All Sing Like The Birdies Sing", and the "Barcarolle" number from Offenbach's opera Tales of Hoffmann. Additional minor cuts and trims were made to voice parts to make the edits seamless.

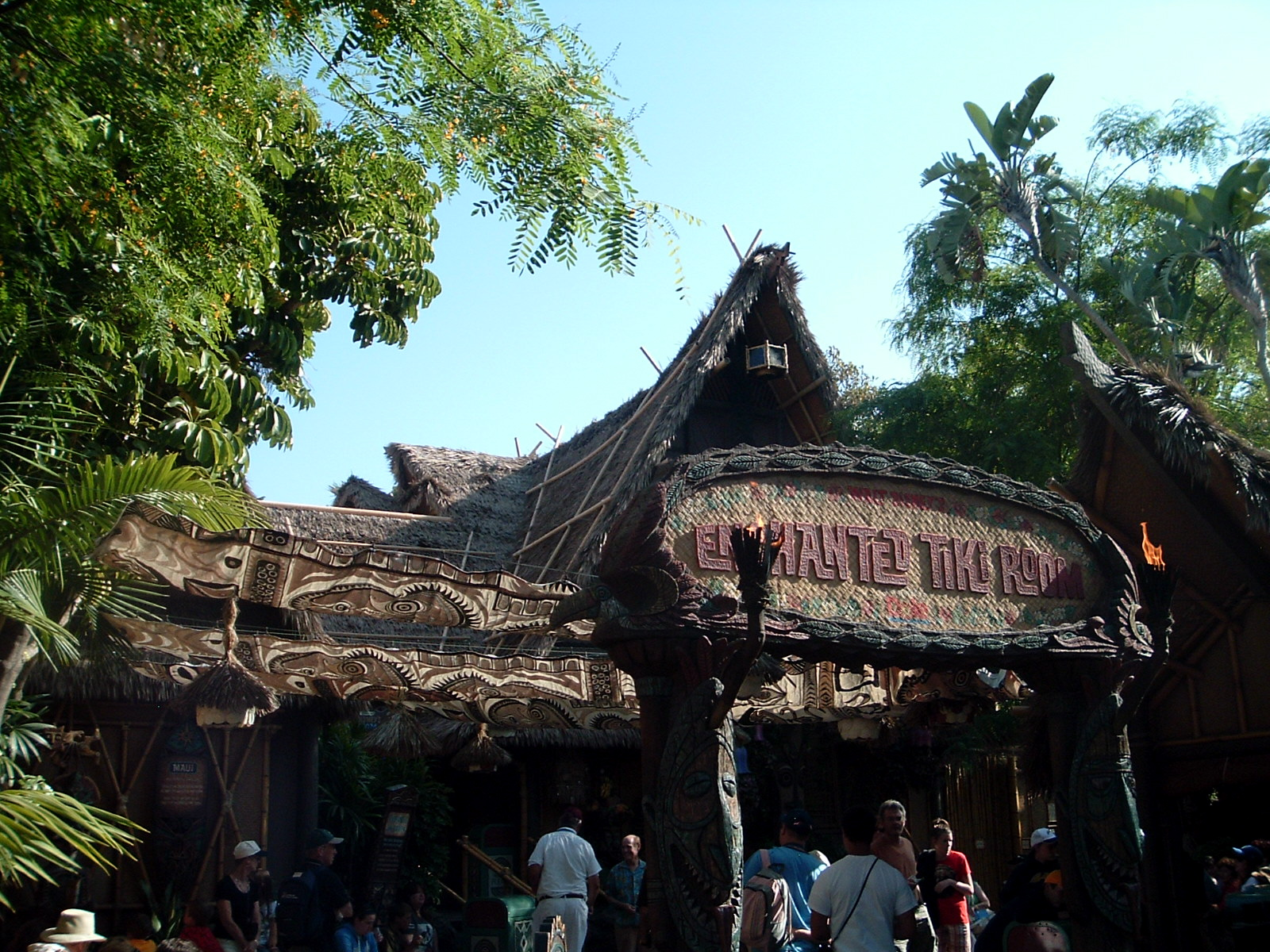
The attraction at Disneyland

Another renovation came to the show in the following decade: The Enchanted Tiki Room reopened in March 2005 after a seven-month refurbishment, commissioned by new Disneyland management as part of its effort to restore the park for its 50th birthday. (Note: Other sources indicate that the renovation was prompted by the sponsor, Dole.) Prior to this renovation, feathers regularly fell from the Audio-Animatronics birds, the building's thatched roof was breaking away in broad daylight, and the Audio-Animatronic figures' movements were noisy and slow. Afterward, the original show and storyline remained, but were now enhanced with a digitally remastered audio track, (Note: Remastered by Randy Thornton, who produced A Musical History of Disneyland.) a new sound system indoors and out, and completely new Audio-Animatronics figures that looked the same as the previous ones, but had a completely different internal apparatus. Updates in technology allowed Walt Disney Imagineering, the descendants of WED Enterprises, to create a show to satisfy 21st century expectations while retaining its classic look.

A few changes were made to the show itself after its refurbishment: In the pre-show in the lanai, rhythmic drums are heard near each god indicating who was going to tell their story next, and the order of the gods was changed. In the main show, the untitled instrumental interlude was cut and the four MC birds' dialogue was abridged.

The original Tiki Room was controlled by a large roomful of floor-to-ceiling computers that operated the birds with data on magnetic tapes, located beneath the floor of the show room. Footage of the original control room is available on the 1965 10th anniversary special featuring Walt Disney and "Miss Disneyland 1965", (Note: Miss Disneyland 1965 was Julie Reihm; Disney called her an ambassador, a role created for the park's tenth anniversary and extended into the 1970s.) "The Tencennial Special".

=== Facts and figures ===
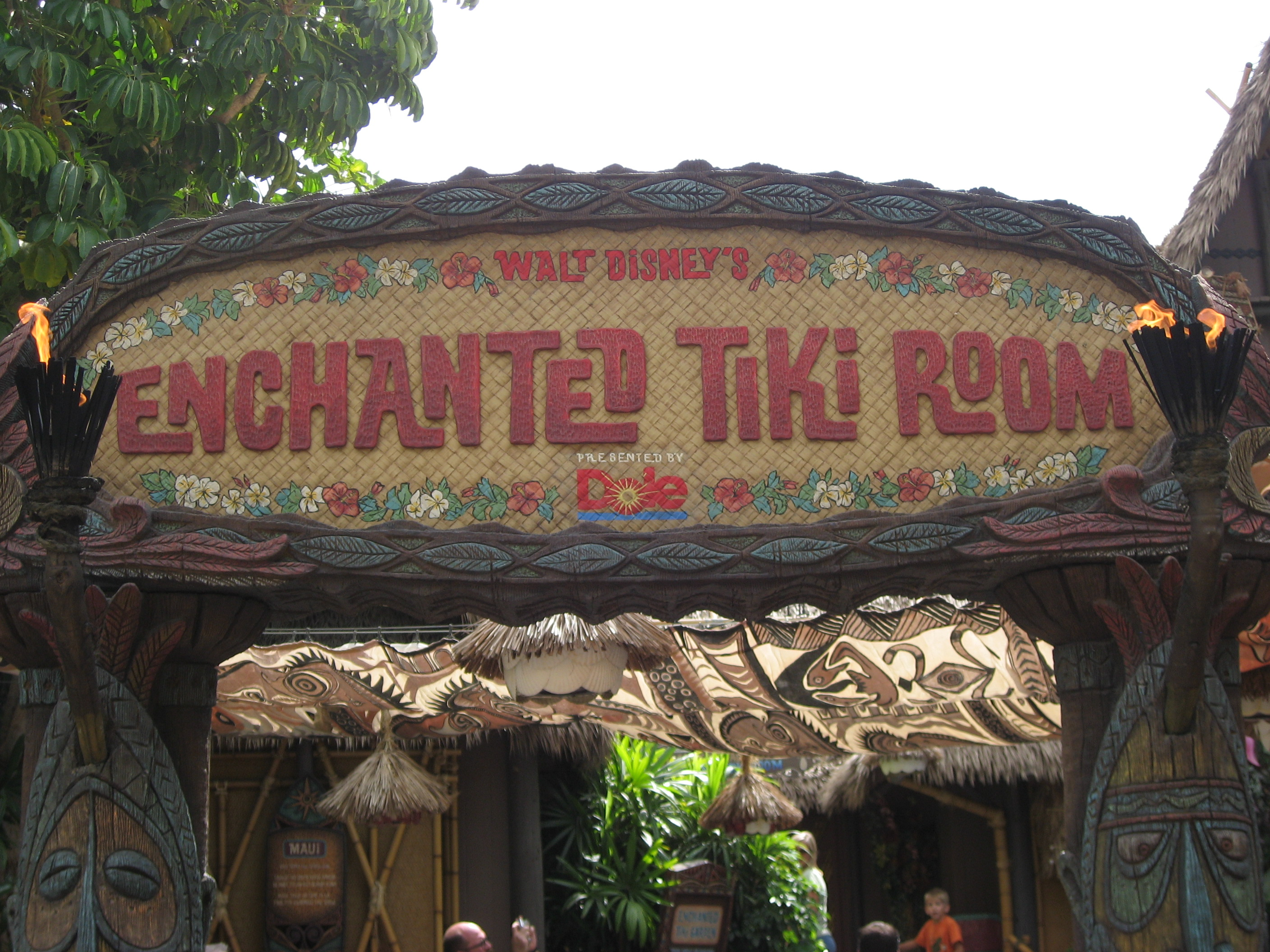
Entrance sign at Disneyland

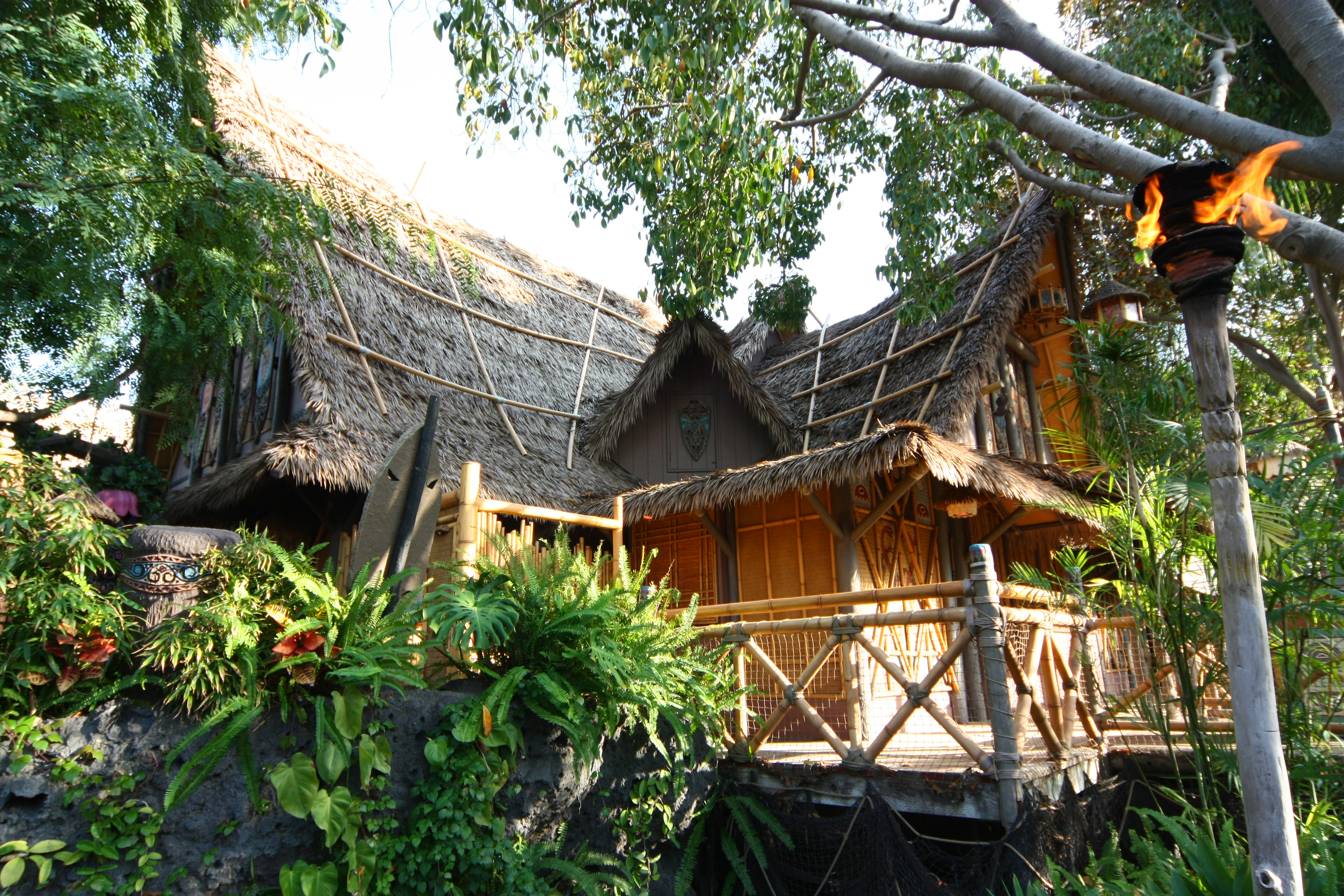
Back exterior of building at Disneyland

- Grand opening: June 23, 1963
- Designer: WED Enterprises
- Sponsor: Dole Foods
- Original show length: 17:23
- Current show length: 12:33
  - Pre-show: 3:58
- Show Type: Theater presentation with Audio-Animatronics

According to the book Disneyland Detective by Kendra Trahan, the "cast list" breaks down as follows:

- 54 singing orchids
- 4 totem poles
- 12 tiki drummers
- 24 singing masks
- 7 birds of paradise (the plant variety)
- 8 macaws
- 12 toucans
- 9 forktails
- 6 cockatoos
- 20 assorted tropical birds

== Walt Disney World ==
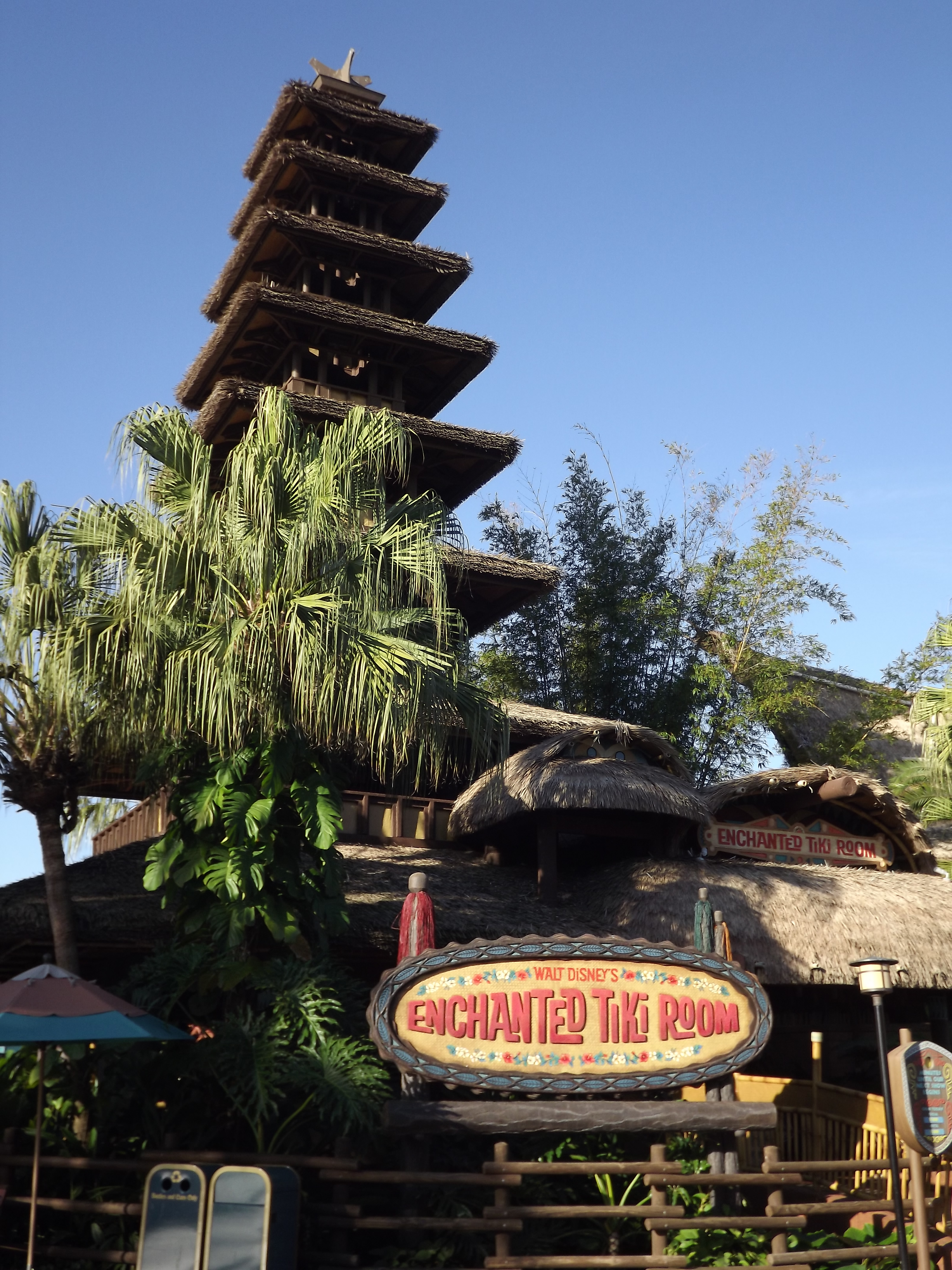
The attraction at Magic Kingdom

A virtually identical copy of the show, called Tropical Serenade, was installed at Walt Disney World's Magic Kingdom when that park opened in 1971. Although accompanied by a new pre-show, the main show was the same. Tropical Serenade was eventually renamed The Enchanted Tiki Birds in 1993 and replaced in 1998 with The Enchanted Tiki Room (Under New Management), featuring Iago from Aladdin and Zazu from The Lion King. The attraction was met with mixed reception from guests.

On January 12, 2011, a small fire broke out in the attraction's attic, severely damaging the Iago audio-animatronic figure. It was announced at Disney's D23 Destination D: Walt Disney World 40th Anniversary Conference that the attraction had been refurbished and returned to the original show format.

The attraction reopened on August 15, 2011, as Walt Disney's Enchanted Tiki Room, a slightly edited version of Disneyland's original show.

== Tokyo Disneyland ==
The attraction was once a clone of the original attraction until it closed for refurbishments on June 16, 1999, when it became The Enchanted Tiki Room: Now Playing "Get the Fever!", where the attraction was re-themed as a madcap Las Vegas-style nightclub show in the middle of the jungle. On January 27, 2008, it closed again and reopened on July 25, 2008, as The Enchanted Tiki Room: Stitch Presents Aloha e Komo Mai!, featuring Stitch from Lilo & Stitch. This version is the only Enchanted Tiki Room without the attraction's classic theme song.

== Original show soundtrack ==
On the original sound recording of the Enchanted Tiki Room for Disneyland, most of the background birds were created by Purv Pullen (aka Dr. Horatio Q. Birdbath). Pullen was a comedy talent best known for his time with Spike Jones and his City Slickers.

A D23 article published for the 50th Anniversary of the attraction in 2013 also cites contributions to the voices of the background birds from Clarence Nash, Maurice Marcelino, and Marion Darlington. Nash voiced Pierre's impression of Donald Duck in the Tokyo version of the attraction, which replaced the character's impression of Maurice Chavalier in the American iterations. The chanting of the tikis in the "Hawaiian War Chant" and the voices of Maui, Ngendi, Koro and Rongo in the waiting area were provided by Hawaiian musician Ernest Tavares. Ginny Tyler voiced Pele and Tangaroa-Ru and Anne Essex voiced Hina.

Wally Boag is also credited as providing the voice for José the parrot. Longtime Disney collaborator Thurl Ravenscroft gave a 1996 Disneyland Inside Out interview to J. D. Roth, in which he pointed out all of the various voices he performed across Disneyland, including Fritz the bass-voiced German parrot.

== In popular culture ==
- A version of the Enchanted Tiki Room appears in season 1, episode 12 of The Wonderful World of Mickey Mouse, titled "The Enchanting Hut." When Mickey and Minnie are threatened by a tropical storm while vacationing on an island, the sentient flora and fauna assemble a tiki hut to shelter them. By the end of the episode, the interior of the hut closely resembles the park attraction, complete with singing tiki poles, flowers, macaws, and the central fountain.
- The missing "Rosita", who became the centerpiece of the adjacent Tropical Hideaway eatery at Disneyland, is featured in the Jungle Cruise film as Nilo Nemolato's pet.
- The Tales from Adventureland books by Jason Lethcoe would feature the Tiki Room as a key location in the first volume The Keymaster's Quest, depicting it as a hidden sanctuary for talking birds known as the Akamai located on the Hawaiian island of Molokai.
- Disney was in early negotiations to pick up "Tiki," a spec script from Ahmet Zappa and Michael Wilson that is set in the world of Polynesian mythology inspired by the ride.
- Marvel Comics's Disney Kingdoms imprint published a five-part miniseries based on the Enchanted Tiki Room in 2016. It took the form of an ensemble comedy loosely inspired by the television series Fantasy Island with visitors to the island working through their personal issues in a fantastical way, while the friendship between the four macaws starts to strain from José's ego begins growing out of control.

== Legacy ==
An experience at the Enchanted Tiki Room inspired Atari co-founder Nolan Bushnell to use animatronics as the center of a pizza restaurant concept that became Chuck E. Cheese.

== See also ==
- 2011 in amusement parks
- List of Disneyland attractions
- List of Magic Kingdom attractions
- List of Tokyo Disneyland attractions
