= List of Disney attractions using Audio-Animatronics =

This is a list of Disney attractions, including those at Walt Disney Parks and Resorts, that have used Audio-Animatronics.

== Disneyland Resort ==
=== Disneyland ===
- Main Street, U.S.A.
  - Great Moments with Mr. Lincoln
  - Walt Disney – A Magical Life
- Adventureland
  - Adventureland Treehouse
  - Walt Disney's Enchanted Tiki Room
  - Indiana Jones Adventure: Temple of the Forbidden Eye
  - Jungle Cruise
- New Orleans Square
  - The Haunted Mansion
  - Pirates of the Caribbean
- Frontierland
  - Mark Twain Riverboat
  - Sailing Ship Columbia
  - Big Thunder Mountain Railroad
  - Mine Train Through Nature's Wonderland (since removed)
  - Entertainment
    - Fantasmic!
- Bayou Country (Formerly Critter Country (1988–2024))
  - Splash Mountain (since removed)
  - The Many Adventures of Winnie the Pooh
  - Tiana's Bayou Adventure
  - Country Bear Jamboree (since removed)
- Fantasyland
  - It's a Small World
  - Matterhorn Bobsleds
- Mickey's Toontown
  - Mickey & Minnie's Runaway Railway
  - Roger Rabbit's Car Toon Spin
- Tomorrowland
  - Star Tours (since removed)
  - Star Tours – The Adventures Continue
  - Buzz Lightyear Astro Blasters
  - Finding Nemo Submarine Voyage
  - Submarine Voyage (since removed)
  - Innoventions (since removed)
  - America Sings (since removed)
  - Flight to the Moon (since removed)
  - Mission to Mars (since removed)
  - Carousel of Progress (since moved to Walt Disney World's Magic Kingdom)
  - Muppet Mobile Lab
- Star Wars: Galaxy's Edge
  - Millennium Falcon: Smugglers Run
  - Star Wars: Rise of the Resistance
- Parades
  - Walt Disney's Parade of Dreams (since removed)

=== Disney California Adventure ===
- A Bug's Land (since removed)
  - It's Tough to Be a Bug! (since removed)
- Avatar Experience (Opening in TBA)
  - Untitled Avatar boat ride
- Avengers Campus
  - Guardians of the Galaxy - Mission: Breakout!
  - Web Slingers: A Spider-Man Adventure
- Cars Land
  - Radiator Springs Racers
- Hollywood Land
  - Muppet*Vision 3D (since removed)
  - Mickey's PhilharMagic
  - Monsters, Inc. Mike & Sulley to the Rescue!
  - Superstar Limo (since removed)
  - Lucky the Dinosaur (temporary 'walk-around' animatronic)
  - Muppet Mobile Lab (temporary 'walk-around' animatronic)
- Pixar Pier
  - Coco Attraction
  - Toy Story Midway Mania!
- Paradise Gardens Park
  - The Little Mermaid: Ariel's Undersea Adventure

== Walt Disney World Resort ==
=== Magic Kingdom ===
- Adventureland
  - Walt Disney's Enchanted Tiki Room
  - The Enchanted Tiki Room (Under New Management) (since removed)
  - Jungle Cruise
  - Pirates of the Caribbean
- Liberty Square
  - The Hall of Presidents
  - The Haunted Mansion
- Villains Land (Opening in TBA)
  - Maleficent Coaster
- Frontierland
  - Big Thunder Mountain Railroad
  - Miss Fritter's Daredevil Spin-Along
  - Cars Ridge Run Rally
  - Tiana's Bayou Adventure
  - Splash Mountain (since removed)
  - Country Bear Jamboree (since removed)
  - Country Bear Musical Jamboree
- Fantasyland
  - It's a Small World
  - Mickey's PhilharMagic
  - 20,000 Leagues Under the Sea: Submarine Voyage (since removed)
  - Under the Sea: Journey of the Little Mermaid
  - The Many Adventures of Winnie the Pooh
  - The Barnstormer
  - Enchanted Tales with Belle
  - Seven Dwarfs Mine Train
- Tomorrowland
  - The Carousel of Progress
  - Stitch's Great Escape! (since removed)
  - Buzz Lightyear's Space Rangers Spin (an all-new animatronics is character called Buddy the Robot)
  - Sonny Eclipse and the Amazing Astro Organ at Cosmic Ray's Starlight Café
  - Flight to the Moon (since removed)
  - Mission to Mars (since removed)
  - The Timekeeper (since removed)
  - ExtraTERRORestrial Alien Encounter (since removed)

=== Epcot ===
- Future World (since removed)
  - Innoventions (animatronics since removed)
  - Universe of Energy (since removed)
    - Ellen's Energy Adventure (since removed)
  - Wonders of Life (standing but not operating)
    - Cranium Command (since removed)
  - Horizons (since removed)
  - World of Motion (since removed)
- World Celebration
  - Spaceship Earth
  - Imagination!
    - Journey Into Imagination with Figment
- World Nature
  - The Land
    - Living with the Land
  - The Seas
    - The Seas with Nemo & Friends
- World Showcase
  - The American Adventure
  - Medieval Diorama at the Sportsman's Shoppe
  - Frozen Ever After
  - Maelstrom (since removed)
  - Chef Remy at Les Chefs de France (temporary 'walk-around' animatronic)
  - Gran Fiesta Tour Starring The Three Caballeros
  - El Rio del Tiempo (since rethemed to feature The Three Caballeros)
- Entertainment
  - Muppet Mobile Lab

=== Disney's Hollywood Studios ===
- Grand Avenue (since removed)
  - Muppet*Vision 3D (since removed)
- Hollywood Boulevard
  - Mickey and Minnie's Runaway Railway
  - The Great Movie Ride (since removed)
- Echo Lake
  - Star Tours (since removed)
  - Star Tours - The Adventures Continue
- Monstropolis (Opening in 2027)
  - Monsters, Inc. Door Coaster (Opening in 2028)
  - Welcome to Monstropolis
  - Harryhausen's
- Sunset Boulevard
  - Lightning McQueen's Racing Academy (since removed)
  - Rock 'n' Roller Coaster Starring The Muppets
- Star Wars: Galaxy's Edge
  - Millennium Falcon: Smugglers Run
  - Star Wars: Rise of the Resistance
- Toy Story Land
  - Slinky Dog Dash
- Walt Disney Studios
  - The Magic of Disney Animation
    - Olaf Draws!

=== Disney Springs ===
- World of Disney (Removed in 2007)
- Rainforest Cafe
- Adventurers Club (Removed in 2008)

=== Disney's Animal Kingdom ===
- Discovery Island
  - It's Tough to Be a Bug! (since ended)
  - Zootopia: Better Zoogether!
- DinoLand U.S.A. (since ended)
  - Dinosaur (since ended)
  - Lucky the Dinosaur (since ended)
- Tropical Americas
  - Indiana Jones and the Myth of the Jade Serpent (Opening in 2027)
  - Antonio's Fiesta de Encanto
- Africa
  - Festival of the Lion King
  - Kilimanjaro Safaris
- Asia
  - Expedition Everest
- Pandora – The World of Avatar
  - Avatar Flight of Passage
  - Na'vi River Journey

== Tokyo Disney Resort ==
=== Tokyo Disneyland ===
- Adventureland
  - Primeval World diorama (as part of Western River Railroad)
  - Jungle Cruise
  - The Enchanted Tiki Room: Stitch Presents Aloha e Komo Mai!
  - The Enchanted Tiki Room: Now Playing Get the Fever! (since removed)
  - The Enchanted Tiki Room (since removed)
  - Pirates of the Caribbean
- Critter Country
  - Splash Mountain
- Westernland
  - Country Bear Theater
  - Big Thunder Mountain
  - Mark Twain Riverboat
  - Big Thunder Mountain Railroad
- Fantasyland
  - Enchanted Tale of Beauty and the Beast
  - It's a Small World
  - Mickey's PhilharMagic
  - Mickey Mouse Revue (since removed)
  - Haunted Mansion
  - Pooh's Hunny Hunt
  - Cinderella's Fairy Tale Hall
- ToonTown
  - Mickey's House and Meet Mickey
  - Roger Rabbit's Car Toon Spin
- Tomorrowland
  - Star Tours (since removed)
  - Star Tours – The Adventures Continue
  - Sugar Rush: Sweet Rescue (Opening in Spring 2027)
  - Buzz Lightyear's Astro Blasters (since removed)
  - Monsters, Inc. Ride & Go Seek

=== Tokyo DisneySea ===
- Mediterranean Harbor
  - Soaring: Fantastic Flight
- Arabian Coast
  - Sinbad's Storybook Voyage
  - Magic Lamp Theater
- Port Discovery
  - Nemo & Friends SeaRider
  - StormRider (since removed)
- Mermaid Lagoon
  - Mermaid Lagoon Theater
- American Waterfront
  - Tower of Terror
  - Toy Story Mania!
- Fantasy Springs
  - Fairy Tinker Bell's Busy Buggies
  - Anna and Elsa's Frozen Journey
  - Rapunzel's Lantern Festival
- Lost River Delta
  - Indiana Jones Adventure: Temple of the Crystal Skull
- Mysterious Island
  - Journey to the Center of the Earth
  - 20,000 Leagues Under the Sea
- Entertainment
  - Fantasmic! (nighttime show since removed)

== Disneyland Paris ==
=== Disneyland Park ===
- Frontierland
  - Phantom Manor
  - Big Thunder Mountain Railroad
  - Thunder Mesa Riverboats
- Adventureland
  - Le Passage Enchanté d'Aladdin
  - Pirates of the Caribbean
  - Colonel Hathi's Pizza Outpost
- Fantasyland
  - Le Château de la Belle au Bois Dormant
  - It's a Small World
- Discoveryland
  - Le Visionarium (since removed)
  - Les Mystères du Nautilus
  - Star Tours (since removed)
  - Star Tours - L'Aventure Continue
  - Buzz Lightyear Laser Blast

=== Disney Adventure World ===
- Worlds of Pixar
  - Crush's Coaster
- World of Frozen
  - Frozen Ever After
- Avengers Campus
  - Avengers Assemble: Flight Force
  - Spider-Man W.E.B. Adventure
- Pride Lands (Opening in TBA)
  - The Land of the Lion King

== Hong Kong Disneyland Resort ==
=== Hong Kong Disneyland ===
- Main Street, U.S.A.
  - Hong Kong Disneyland Railroad
- Adventureland
  - Jungle River Cruise
  - Festival of the Lion King
  - Tarzan's Treehouse on Tarzan Island
- Fantasyland
  - It's a Small World
  - Mickey's PhilharMagic
  - The Many Adventures of Winnie the Pooh
- Tomorrowland
  - Ant-Man and The Wasp: Nano Battle!
  - Buzz Lightyear Astro Blasters (since removed)
  - Iron Man Experience
- Grizzly Gulch
  - Big Grizzly Mountain Runaway Mine Cars
- Mystic Point
  - Mystic Manor
- World of Frozen
  - Frozen Ever After
  - Wandering Oaken's Sliding Sleighs
  - Playhouse in the Woods
- Parades
  - Mickey's WaterWorks (since removed)
  - Glow in the Park Halloween Parade (since removed)
  - Flights of Fantasy Parade
- Entertainment
  - Muppet Mobile Lab (since removed)

== Shanghai Disneyland ==
=== Shanghai Disneyland ===
- Tomorrowland
  - Buzz Lightyear Planet Rescue
- Fantasyland
  - Seven Dwarfs Mine Train
  - The Many Adventures of Winnie the Pooh
- Treasure Cove
  - Pirates of the Caribbean - Battle for the Sunken Treasure
- Zootopia
  - Zootopia: Hot Pursuit
- Adventure Isle
  - Roaring Rapids (Disney)
  - Soaring Over the Horizon

== Other ==
=== 1964 New York World's Fair ===
- Illinois Pavilion (since moved to the Great Moments with Mr. Lincoln attraction at Disneyland)
- General Electric's Progressland, featuring the Carousel of Progress
- "it's a small world", presented by Pepsi
- Ford's Magic Skyway
