= Push the Talking Trash Can =

Disney theme park robot

Disneyland's Push the Talking Trash Can gets a hands-on examination by Captain Hook, Alice, Tweedledum and The Mad Hatter near the entrance to Tomorrowland. Building in the background is the Plaza Inn restaurant at the edge of Main Street, U.S.A.

Push the Talking Trash Can was a radio-controlled robot which made daily rounds throughout Tomorrowland at Disneyland and Disney California Adventure Park, Disneyland Paris, Tokyo Disneyland in Japan and formerly the Magic Kingdom at Walt Disney World. He still makes daily rounds at Hong Kong Disneyland park.

PUSH was created by Daniel Deutsch, and entertained guests at the Magic Kingdom from February 1995 to February 2014. At one point, the robot was the focus of a grass roots effort to elect him as "Mayor of Tomorrowland". PUSH's Registered Trademark was originally applied for in 1996, then was renewed by Deutsch's company "Real Simple Ideas, LLC."

On February 10, 2014, despite a social media campaign particularly on Twitter using the hashtag "#savePUSH", Push the Talking Trash Can was retired at Walt Disney World.

== Mechanics ==
The robot is puppeteered by a single operator in plain clothes. The transmitter is hidden inside a shoulder strapped gym bag, while the microphone is held at the mouth of the puppeteer, concealed in the hand. The robot contains a voice processor which changes the operator's voice to a high-pitched, nasal register. Since the operator is so close to the robot, Push can interact directly with guests.

The robot is propelled with the transmission, wheels and tires of a custom based robot. It was staffed by a local robotic entertainment company named Real Simple Ideas under contract with Disney. Disney has extended the technique and technology to Audio-Animatronic characters such as the Muppet Mobile Lab, Lucky the Dinosaur, and WALL-E.

== Similar robots ==
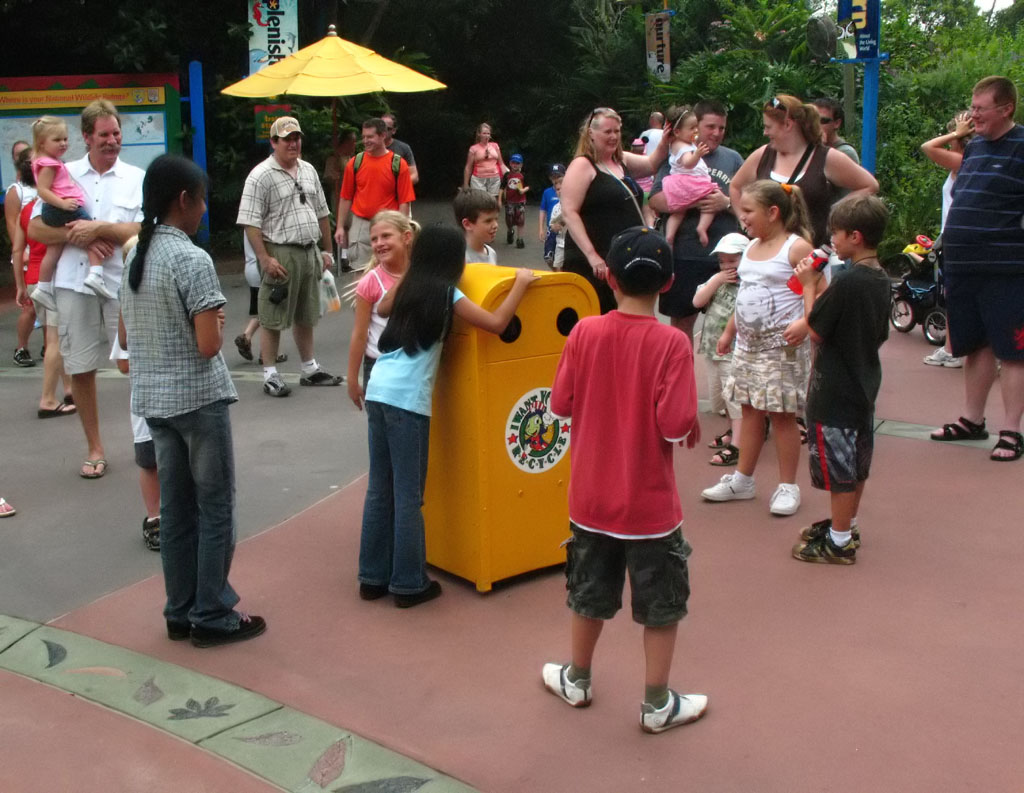
Pipa encourages visitors to recycle.

A recycling bin version of Push (named Pipa) used to be found at Disney's Animal Kingdom in the Rafiki's Planet Watch area. Pipa meant "container" in Swahili, fitting the Animal Kingdom theme. The bin's regular steel liner hid the radio control system, a plastic trash bag over it on the inside.

Wes Palm was a talking Palm Tree located at the front entrance to Disney's Animal Kingdom.

Since 1958, the Dutch theme park De Efteling in Kaatsheuvel has had similar recycling bins named and designed after the fairy tale character Hollow Bulging Gijs (Holle Bolle Gijs), a young boy who continuously shouts for "more food" and sucks up garbage thrown into his mouth.

== See also ==
- Lucky the Dinosaur
- Muppet Mobile Lab
