= Disney on Parade =

Former parade at Hong Kong Disneyland

Hong Kong Disneyland
- Status: Removed
- Opening date: September 12, 2005
- Closing date: November 1, 2010
- Replaced by: Flights of Fantasy Parade

Ride statistics
- Attraction type: Parade

Disney on Parade was a daytime parade of the Hong Kong Disneyland theme park in Penny's Bay, Lantau Island, Hong Kong. It debuted on rehearsal days throughout June 2005, before the grand opening of Hong Kong Disneyland on September 12. The parade takes a few floats and themes from Tokyo Disneyland's former daytime parade named Disney on Parade: 100 Years of Magic.

The park was originally scheduled to receive Disneyland's long-running Parade of the Stars, which was debuted for its 45th anniversary celebration in 2000 and was replaced with a new 50th anniversary parade in 2005. However, officials decided on a different parade for the new park.

The parade was also the genesis for an epiphany of then-CEO Bob Iger which led to the $7.4 billion acquisition of Pixar Animation Studios in 2006. Iger's epiphany was that many of the characters in the parade were from Disney films that were made prior to the mid-90's. He then realized how badly Disney needed Pixar because all characters less than ten years old in the parade were from Pixar's films.

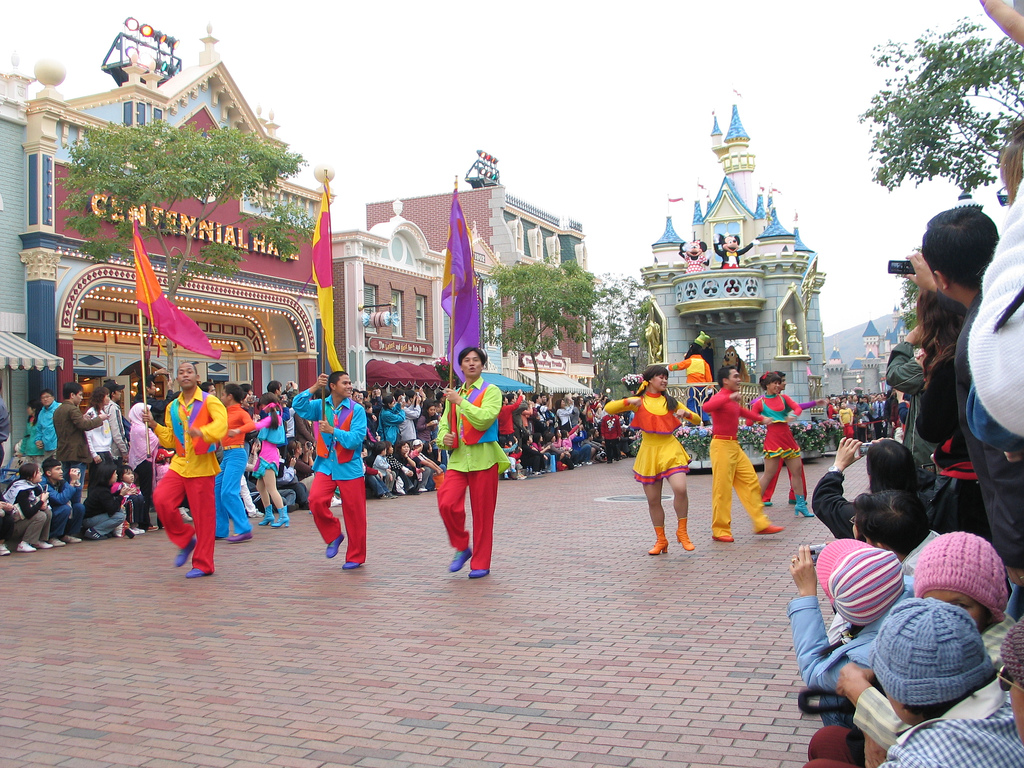

The parade begins in Fantasyland, near the entrance of Storybook Theatre, and ends on Main Street, U.S.A., near the Disneyland City Hall. Floats in Disney on Parade feature Chip 'n' Dale, a studio-like float, Disney Princesses, Alice in Wonderland, The Little Mermaid, Toy Story, and Mickey Mouse and friends in a finale float which looks like the Sleeping Beauty Castle. The parade features almost 100 performers and assisting cast members. During the Christmas season from 2007 to 2010, the parade was enhanced with Christmas themes and ran as the 'Let it Snow' Christmas Parade.

In September 2010, Hong Kong Disneyland celebrated its 5th anniversary. Disney On Parade was replaced by a new parade called Flights of Fantasy Parade on January 21, 2011. Steve Davison, the creator of Disney's World of Color in Disney California Adventure, mentioned at the time that he was working on a parade for Hong Kong Disneyland's 5th anniversary.

== Parade units ==
- Opening: This is a logo float, recycled from 100 Years of Magic.
- The Band Concert Unit: Based on the 1935 animated cartoon. A marching band leads an 8 meter high balloon of Mickey. His hand with the wand moves.
- Chip 'n Dale : The chipmunks are on an art and design float with paint and a flip book of Mickey Mouse.
- Plane Crazy Unit: Based on the 1928 animated cartoon.
- Disney Princess Unit: The unit featured Disney princesses, Snow White from Snow White and the Seven Dwarfs, Cinderella from Cinderella and Aurora from Sleeping Beauty. In Halloween event, this float was used in Glow in the Park Halloween Parade, so the three princesses had to be in the Finale float with Mickey Mouse and his friends.
- Alice in Wonderland Unit: Based on the 1951 animated film.
- The Little Mermaid Unit: Based on the 1989 animated film.
- Toy Story Unit: Based on the Disney and Pixar film.
- Finale: Mickey Mouse and his friends, Minnie Mouse, Pluto, Goofy, Donald Duck, Daisy Duck and Tinkerbell from Peter Pan. Also the statues of Jiminy Cricket from Pinocchio, The Genie from Aladdin, Rafiki from The Lion King and Mushu from Mulan were featured. In Halloween event, because the Disney Princess float was used in Glow in the Park Halloween Parade, Snow White, Cinderella and Aurora were stood on this float, and Pluto, Goofy, Donald and Daisy Duck had to walk out of the float in the Halloween event.

== Music used ==
- CHIP 'N DALE UNIT:
  - "Steamboat Willie"
- PRINCESSES UNIT:
  - "Heigh-ho" / "Hail to the Princess Aurora" / "Someday My Prince Will Come" / "Bibbidi-Bobbidi-Boo (The Magic Song)" / "So This Is Love" / "Once Upon a Dream" / "A Dream is a Wish Your Heart Makes"
- ALICE IN WONDERLAND UNIT:
  - "Painting the Roses Red" / "All in the Golden Afternoon" / "Alice in Wonderland" / "I'm Late" / "The Unbirthday Song" / "A-E-I-O-U (The Caterpillar Song)" / "March of the Cards"
- THE LITTLE MERMAID UNIT:
  - "Under the Sea" / "Poor Unfortunate Souls" / "Kiss the Girl" / "Part of that World"
- TOY STORY UNIT:
  - "You've Got a Friend in Me" / "Woody's Roundup" / "Strange Things"
- FINALE UNIT:
  - "Zip-A-Dee-Doo-Dah" / "Mickey Mouse Club March"

The soundtrack for the parade was used for the Hong Kong Disneyland unit during Hong Kong's 2006 Chinese New Year night parade on 29 January 2006.
