= Meet the World =

Former attraction at Tokyo Disneyland

- Meet the World attraction poster

Tokyo Disneyland
- Area: Tomorrowland
- Status: Removed
- Opening date: April 15, 1983
- Closing date: June 30, 2002
- Replaced by: Monsters, Inc. Ride & Go Seek

Ride statistics
- Designer: Walt Disney Imagineering
- Theme: Japanese history
- Music: "Meet the World" written by the Sherman Brothers (music & lyrics)
- Vehicle type: Rotating theater with Audio-Animatronics
- Duration: 20:00
- Sponsor: National-Panasonic/Japan Airlines
- Required ticket: Free
- Wheelchair accessible

Meet the World (ミート・ザ・ワールド, Mīto za Wārudo) was an attraction at Tomorrowland in Tokyo Disneyland that operated from 1983 until 2002. It was a show that explored the history of Japan over the course of 19 minutes, focusing specifically on the history of Japan's engagement with the outside world. The show featured an animated crane explaining Japanese history to a young boy and girl from Yokohama. The show featured dialogue between a number of audio-animatronic figures (including Sakamoto Ryōma, Itō Hirobumi and Fukuzawa Yukichi) and a movie screen in the background. Park guides and maps said "explore Japan's heritage in an incredible time-travel adventure!"

The show was presented in a rotating theater, similar to the Carousel of Progress at Magic Kingdom and previously at Disneyland. However, they were designed in the opposite way. In Tokyo, the audiences sat in the rotating theater inside with the stages built around them, whereas, in the Carousel of Progress the audience sits in the rotating outside with the stages being the center of the building. Meet the World's layout meant less audience capacity but a larger stage area, while Carousel of Progress's format has more capacity but smaller stages.

The "Meet The World" song was written by the Sherman Brothers. The attraction was designed by WED Enterprises Imagineer Claude Coats. The Animatronics and Show Action Equipment were built at Walt Disney World's Central Shops in Florida (adjacent to the huge carriages for Epcot's American Adventure attraction being built at the same time.) The show scenes were staged at the WED facility in North Hollywood for integration and show programming. The crane character was animated by Disney animator Randy Cartwright. The attraction had over thirty Audio Animatronic figures, nine 70 millimeter projectors and 15 large pieces of show action equipment. There were two large Stewart rear projection screens and three proscenium filling perforated "scrim/screens." The figures were sculpted by Blaine Gibson with the exception of the three Meiji figures who were sculpted in Glendale by a Japanese sculptor from Toho Studios in Tokyo.

== Plot ==
The show opened with two young children from Yokohama discussing the ancient creation of Japan. Soon, an anthropomorphic crane appeared to tell them the whole story. She took them back through time to uncover the ancient Jōmon people and the difficult relationship they encountered with the sea and land. But it changed in the next era when Prince Shōtoku devoted his efforts to 'meet the world' and created a constitution, explored Chinese culture and brought Buddhism, arts and writing systems to Japan. The crane then took them forward through time.

They arrived at Tanegashima where Portuguese traders met with locals, introducing Japan to new trade opportunities as well as the outside world. Additionally, firearms and Christianity were introduced during this period. However, because of these elements, the Sakoku policy of self-exile was enacted, leaving the country in isolation, apart from limited trade with the Dutch and Chinese at Nagasaki. Only when US Navy Commodore Matthew C. Perry arrived with his Black Ships did the exile end and Japan 'meet the world' again. The shogun retired and signaled the time of the Meiji Restoration. However, the ruling power took the idea of 'meet the world' from a peaceful one to a destructive and aggressive one. As a result, Japan soon entered "dark days", but the crane reassured the two children that those days have ended and that Japan now led the way of today.

The young boy asked the crane if she was the "Spirit of Japan", but she responded that he and all the other people were the "Spirit of Japan". A final montage of Japan's modern accomplishments brought the show to a close as the children and the crane soared to the skies on a hot-air balloon.

== Planned Version at Epcot ==
Many attractions, including Meet the World, were originally planned as part of the Japan Pavilion in World Showcase at Epcot in Orlando, Florida. Unlike the other attractions that did not make it past the planning stages, Meet the World's show building was constructed with the theater to be on the second floor. However, due to miscalculations made in the building's design, the rotating theater put a lot of stress on the support beams. In order for the attraction to be able to function safely, the show building would have to have major rework done. As Epcot's construction was behind schedule, it was decided to move forward without the attraction. Today, the current space is used for rehearsals and storage.

== History ==
Konosuke Matsushita, founder of the Matsushita Electric Industrial Company, had a strong interest in Japanese history and in Walt Disney's visions and pressed Disney to create a Japanese analog of the American "Hall of Presidents" attraction.

Among other issues, certain politically sensitive issues such as World War II were noticeably under-emphasized in the show. The show mentions that there were some "dark days" between the Meiji Restoration and the "Japan of today", which left Disney management feeling nervous about possible reactions from guests (specifically American veterans and other groups) over such a dramatic conflict in history being 'glossed over' as 'dark days', despite other attractions in the Disney canon having unbiased references to the same time period. Concept art and models were featured in the 1982 book "Walt Disney's EPCOT Center", along with a proposed Africa pavilion. The English soundtrack of the ride had surfaced on a tribute video, where it was edited with footage from the version seen in Tokyo Disneyland.

The attraction opened at Tokyo Disneyland as one of that park's initial attractions on April 15, 1983, and closed on June 30, 2002. Matsushita Electric was its initial sponsor and subsidized the attraction so that it was one of the few free attractions while the park still used ride tickets. Konosuke Matsushita died in 1989 and Matsushita shifted its corporate sponsorship to the nearby Star Tours attraction around that time; Japan Airlines then took over sponsorship of Meet the World for a short period.

In summer 2006, Meet the World's show building was demolished to make way for Monsters, Inc. Ride & Go Seek.

Meet the World was one of the few attractions in the park that dealt with Japan; the other was a film, "The Eternal Sea", found in the future Magic-Eye Theater. The Oriental Land Company, the owners of Tokyo Disneyland, specifically wanted their park to focus on the American way of life and the American parks of Walt Disney World and Disneyland Resort.
