= 'Let it Snow' Christmas Parade =

Parade at Hong Kong Disneyland

Hong Kong Disneyland
- Status: Removed
- Opening date: November 23, 2007
- Closing date: January 2, 2011

Ride statistics
- Attraction type: Seasonal parade

'Let it Snow' Christmas Parade (Chinese: 雪映舞動巡遊) was a parade at Hong Kong Disneyland that replaced Disney on Parade, the park's regular operating parade. The parade itself was essentially the same as Disney on Parade but with new Christmas additions, decorations and replacements. It first ran from 23 November 2007 through 6 January 2008 as part of the A Sparkling Christmas Holiday event. The parade ran for another three years, until the 2010 Christmas season.
