= Monsters, Inc. Ride & Go Seek =

Dark ride at Tokyo Disneyland

Coordinates: 35.6338°N 139.8790°E

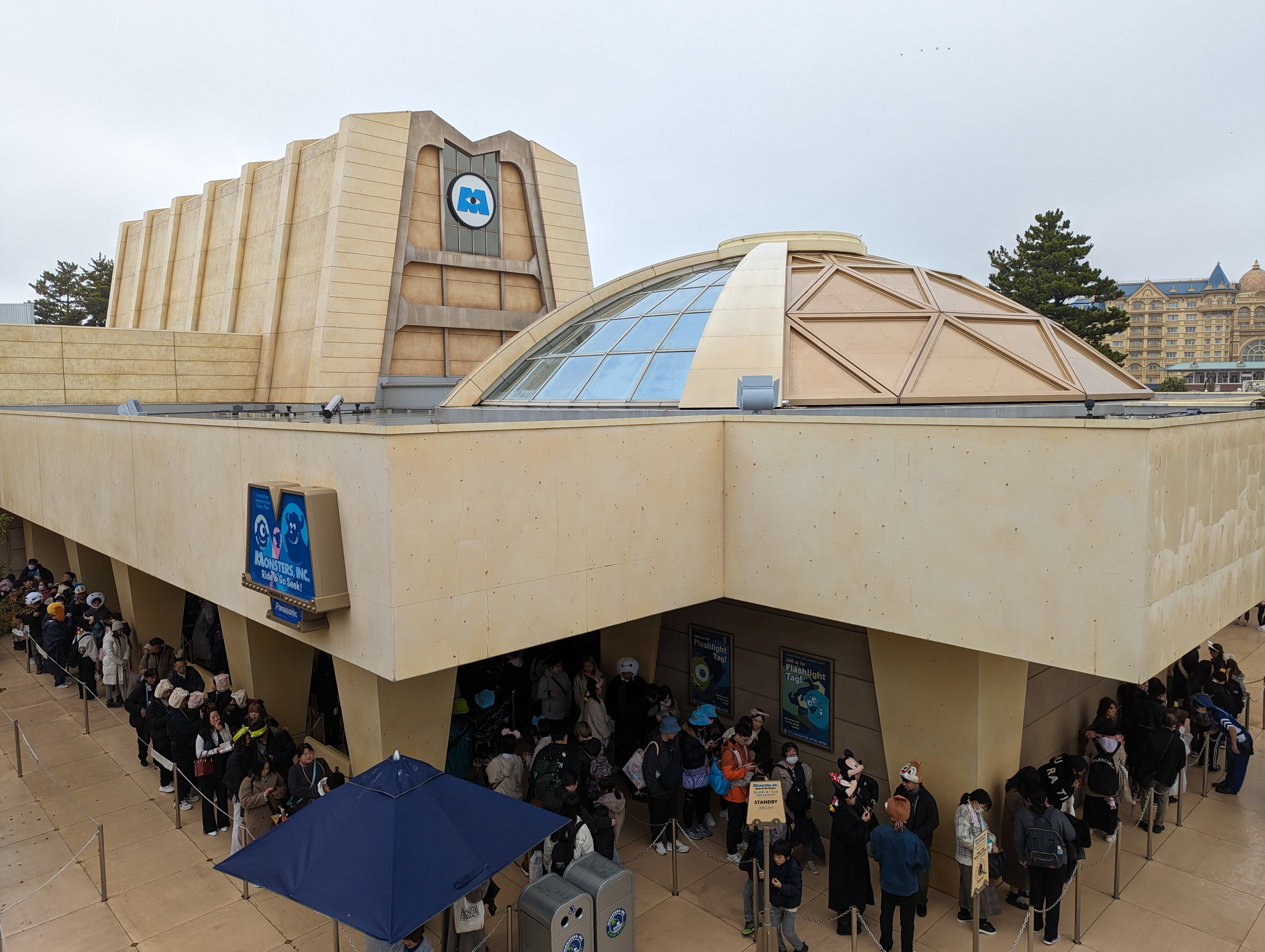

Tokyo Disneyland
- Area: Tomorrowland
- Status: Operating
- Opening date: April 15, 2009
- Replaced: Meet the World

Ride statistics
- Attraction type: Shooting dark ride
- Manufacturer: Ride & Show Engineering, Inc.
- Designer: Walt Disney Imagineering
- Theme: Monsters, Inc.
- Vehicle type: Cars
- Vehicles: Security Vehicles
- Sponsor: Panasonic
- Disney Premier Access available
- Must transfer from wheelchair
- Assistive listening available

Monsters, Inc. Ride & Go Seek is an interactive dark ride attraction at Tokyo Disneyland. It is based on Pixar's 2001 film Monsters, Inc. The attraction opened on April 15, 2009 and replaced Meet the World.

The attraction can be found at the entrance of Tomorrowland under the guise of the Monsters, Inc. scare factory from the film. Taking place after the events of the film, the factory's new slogan has been changed from "We Scare Because We Care" to "It's Laughter We're After". This new slogan was later used in the film's sequel television series Monsters at Work.

== Summary ==
=== Queue ===
The queue building's exterior and interior are intricately themed to replicate the Monsters, Inc factory building from the film. Various posters posted along the exterior of the factory inform guests about "Flashlight Tag," an upcoming activity that is fun for the whole family. Once inside the factory, an instructional video is presented to guests on the premise of flashlight tag, narrated by Mike Wazowski. After learning how to play, guests are sent into "security vehicles" that have been equipped with individual flashlights, and enter the inner sanctums of the factory.

=== Ride ===
Sulley has brought Boo back to Monstropolis in hopes that she will join in the flashlight festivities. Although it seems as if Boo is interested, she giggles naughtily, intending to go exploring rather than playing. Turning a corner, guests find that Randall Boggs has returned from the human world, determined to capture Boo to extract her screams, by the usage of a butterfly net. Randall's evil laugh echoes through the factory, and the vehicles turn to face a window overlooking all of Monstropolis at nightfall. Mike stands nearby at the switch of a power generator, that supposedly gives power to all of Monstropolis. Mike kicks the flashlight tag off by turning off the generator, causing the entire factory and the city to go dark.

Entering the locker room, the flashlights turn on, allowing guests to point them at various objects, activating different characters and objects to move. Several tiny monsters pop out of the lockers, while other objects simply pop out from underneath floor tiles and benches. Turning into the bathroom, Sulley can be seen searching for Boo with his flashlight, Boo's giggling is heard from an unseen location.

Randall can be found here hiding from Sulley whom he stands right behind. Pulling into the laugh floor, guests find several of M.I.'s top comedians joining in on the game, Sulley is found searching for Boo underneath tables. Mike can be found stuck in a jam between a hanging door and the arms of Smitty, trying to pull him back, while Needleman fiddles with the control panel. Leaving the laugh floor behind, guests pass Randall again whom the guests find hides behind a door, followed by a large crocodilian monster grasping a flashlight and laughing. Leaving the factory and entering the streets of Monstropolis, various monsters can be found searching the streets with flashlights, many hiding in objects such as mail boxes and television sets.

Boo is seen standing in the center of a dark alley, Randall mysteriously appears behind her with a net. However, Sulley pops out from a manhole beneath Boo, hoisting her into the air. Entering Harryhausen's sushi restaurant, guests find the octopus-like chef searching for Boo who can be found popping in and out of several different take-out boxes. Several odd fish can be found throughout the store, which also react to the flashlights. Preparing to leave the restaurant, Mike can be found with his girlfriend Celia, allowing guests to dunk her in water by using their flashlights to activate her tank. She falls in the water, and the vehicles head back into the streets.

After tagging several more monsters, Mike can be found being electrocuted by a large power source continuously, the veins in his eye is illuminating with each shock. Sulley appears up ahead, worried that he has lost Boo again. He calls her name out in fright, but she is nowhere in sight. Entering the factory again, guests find Boo playing with some garbage outside of a garbage compactor, unaware that Randall is directly behind her, raising his butterfly net.

Randall mutters to himself about his success, and when the power is suddenly returned to the factory, Mike emerges from a grate in the floor, knocking Randall backwards and sending him screaming into the garbage compactor which, as guests watch on, sends him on a conveyor belt, only to be run over by a spike-lined wheel, repeatedly getting his body pummeled by large iron poles, flattened and spun across another large wheel while changing skin colors, then, chopped up by a large wall-like contraption, and emerge from the compactor in the shape of a cube, much like several other compacted cubes of garbage around him. Randall's eyes spin in circles as he groans in pain.

Turning away from the garbage compactor, Mike, Sulley, and Boo can be found outside of Boo's door, saying goodbye. Leaving them behind, the vehicles pass a small monster that waves goodbye, Boo beneath him, also saying goodbye. Turning yet another corner, guests pass an interactive audio animatronic Roz who resides in a filing room. Roz interacts with guests, as she does at the end of Monsters, Inc. Mike & Sulley to the Rescue!. Guests leave their ride vehicles and exit into the Monsters, Inc. Company Store, where they can view their photos that were taken during the ride but cannot be purchased.
