= Audio-Animatronics =

Trademark for a form of robotic animation

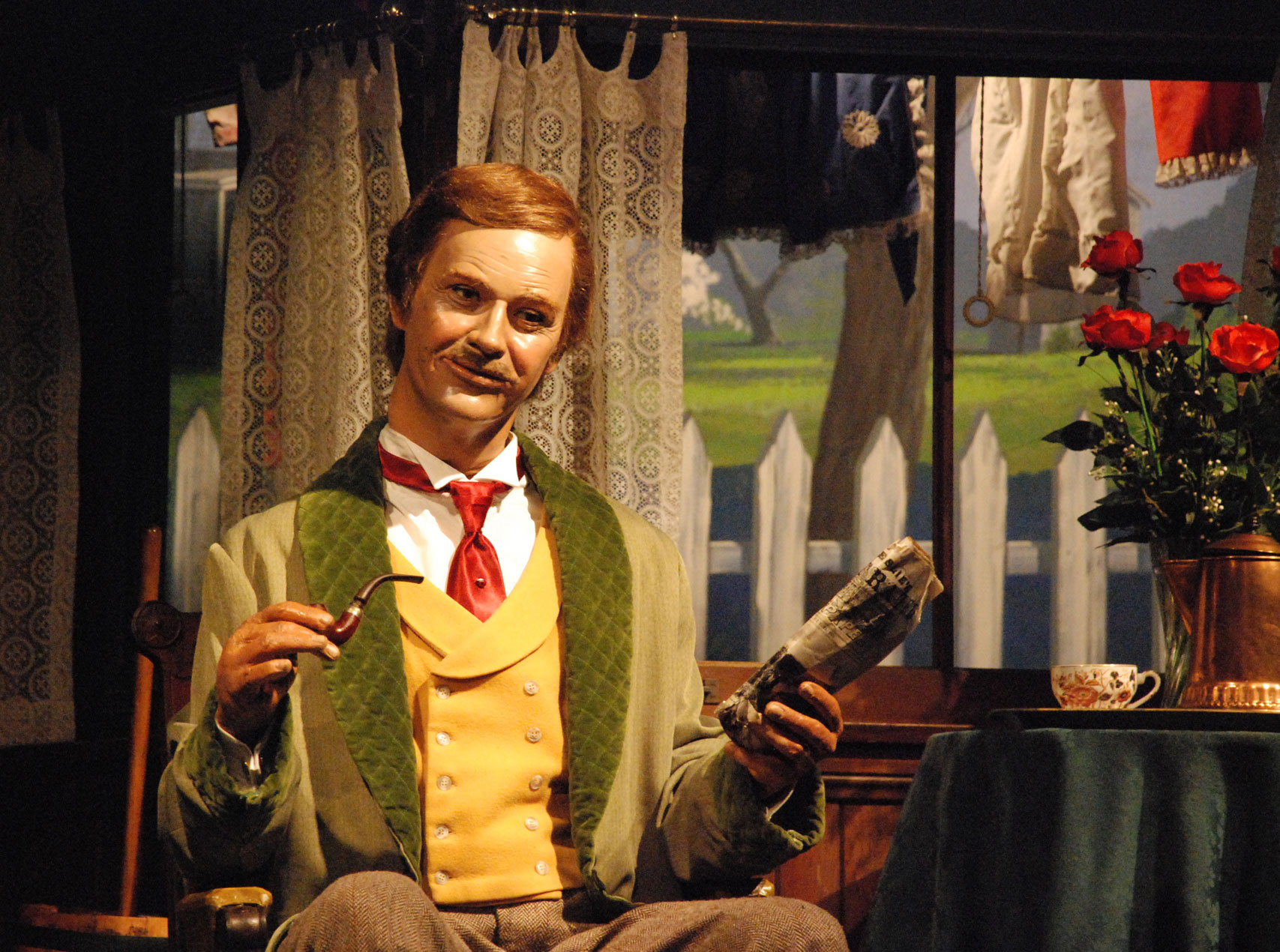
Audio-Animatronic of Father John, the main character of the Walt Disney's Carousel of Progress attraction at Magic Kingdom

Audio-Animatronics (also known simply as AAs) are a form of mechatronic animatronics puppetry created by Walt Disney Imagineering and trademarked by the Walt Disney Company for use in designed shows and attractions at Disney theme parks.

Audio-Animatronics move and often synchronize with an audio soundtrack from an external sound system (generally a recorded speech or song), and are usually fixed to whatever supports them. They can sit and stand but cannot produce any form of locomotion.

An Audio-Animatronic differs from an android or robot in that it uses prerecorded movements and sounds, rather than responding to external stimuli.

== History ==
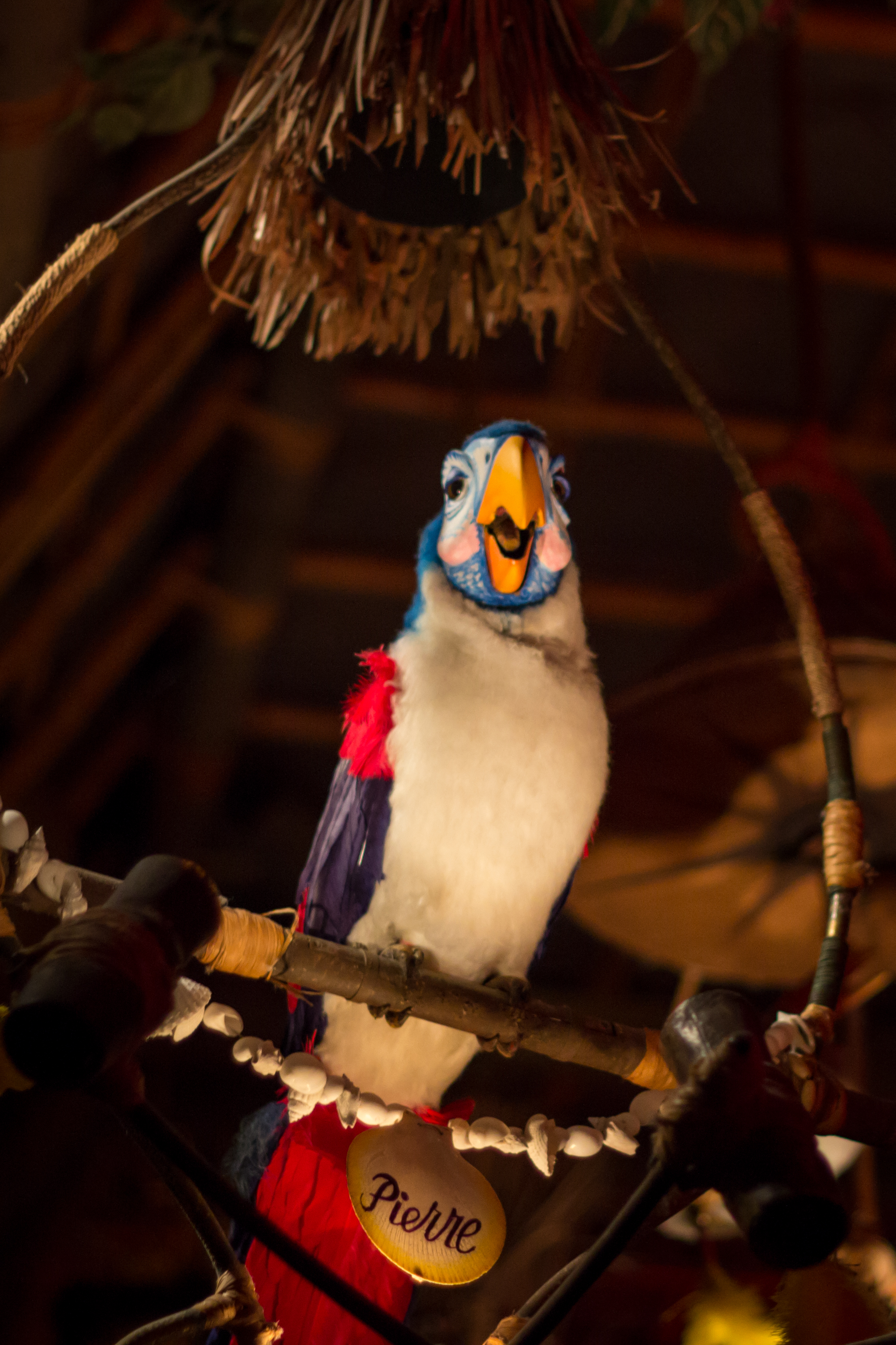
Pierre, a talking parrot in Walt Disney's Enchanted Tiki Room at Disneyland, the first attraction with Audio-Animatronics

Audio-Animatronics were originally a creation of Disney employee Lee Adams, who worked as an electrician. Walt Disney got a mechanical toy bird in New Orleans and found out how it worked, which served as the inspiration for Audio-Animatronics. An early robotic figure was the Dancing Man, created by Roger Broggie and Wathel Rogers, and modeled after a tap dancing routine by actor Buddy Ebsen.

Development of the first audio animatronic technology began in 1949 with the work of the giant squid for 20,000 Leagues Under the Sea (1954).

The term "Audio-Animatronics" was first used commercially by Disney in 1961, was filed as a trademark in 1964, and was registered in 1967.

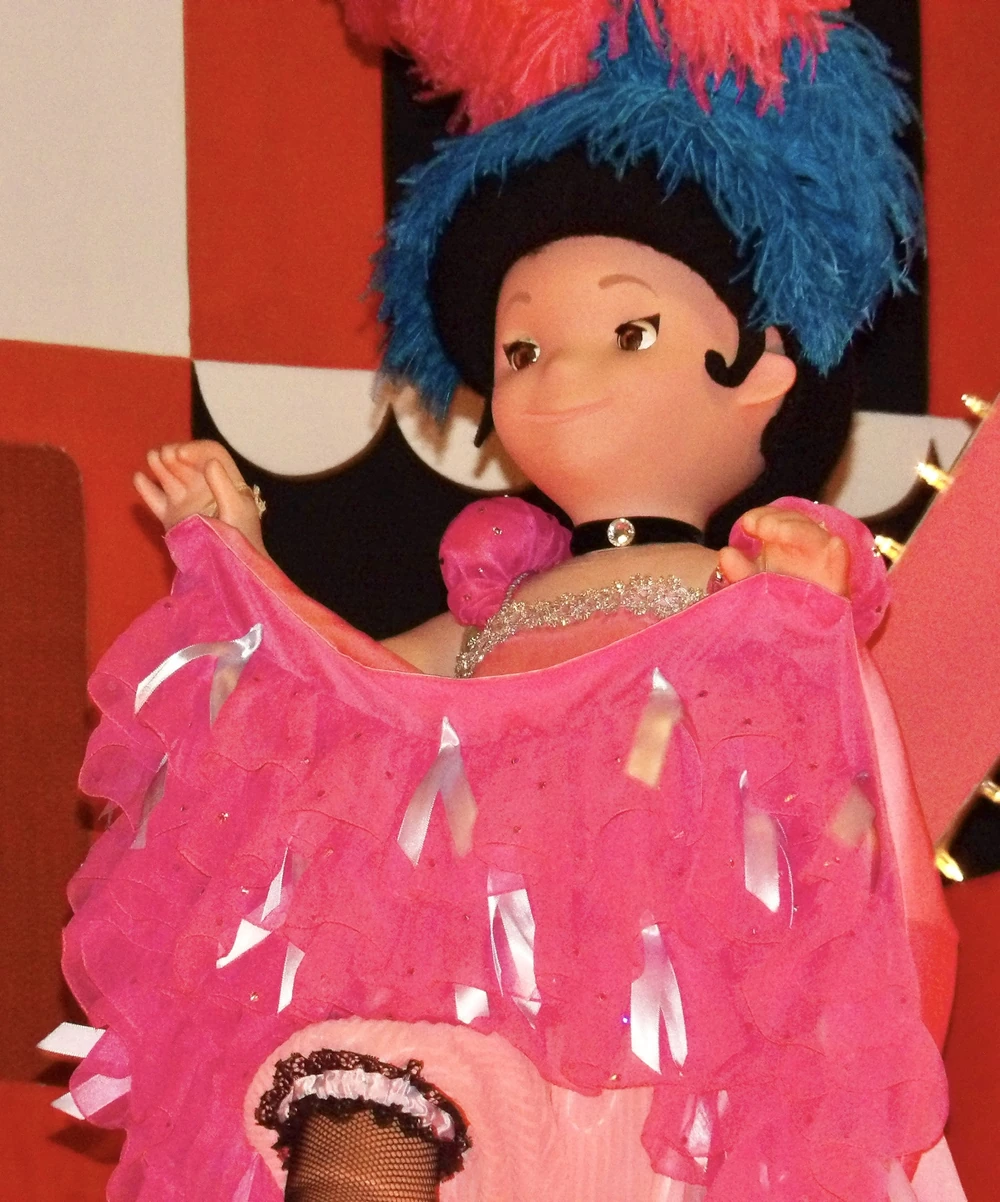
An Audio-Animatronics doll in the France section of It's a Small World at Disneyland

The Audio-Animatronic show The Enchanted Tiki Room opened in 1963 at Disneyland. It is a room full of tropical creatures with eye and facial actions synchronized to a musical score entirely by electromechanical means. The Audio-Animatronic cast of the musical revue uses tones recorded on tape to vibrate a metal reed that closes a circuit to trigger a relay, which sends a pulse of electricity to a mechanism that causes a pneumatic valve to move part of the figure.

The movements of the attraction's birds, flowers, and tiki idols are triggered by sound. Figures' movements have a neutral "natural resting position" that the limb or part returns to when there is no electric pulse present. Other than this, the animation is a binary system, with only on/off moves, such as an open or closed eye. The same kind of technology was used for the parrot head handle of Mary Poppins' umbrella in Mary Poppins (1964). In addition, an Audio-Animatronic robin was used in the film during the "A Spoonful of Sugar" sequence.

Other early Audio-Animatronics were at the 1964 New York World's Fair. They were used in the Great Moments with Mr. Lincoln exhibit at the State of Illinois Pavilion, Pepsi/UNICEF's "it's a small world" exhibit, General Electric's Carousel of Progress, and Ford Motor Company's "Magic Skyway."

== Technology ==
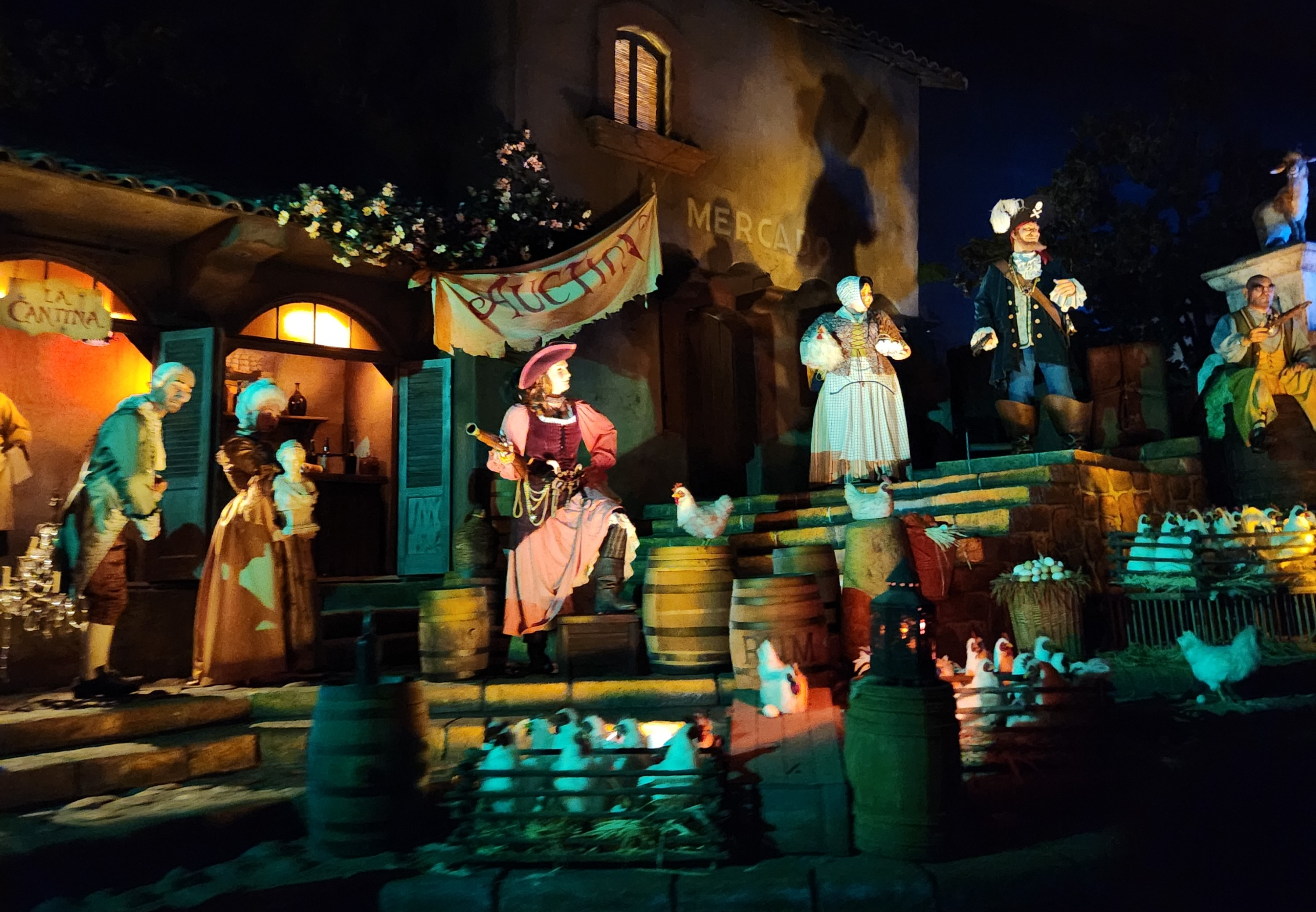
The auction scene (2018–present) in Pirates of the Caribbean at Disneyland

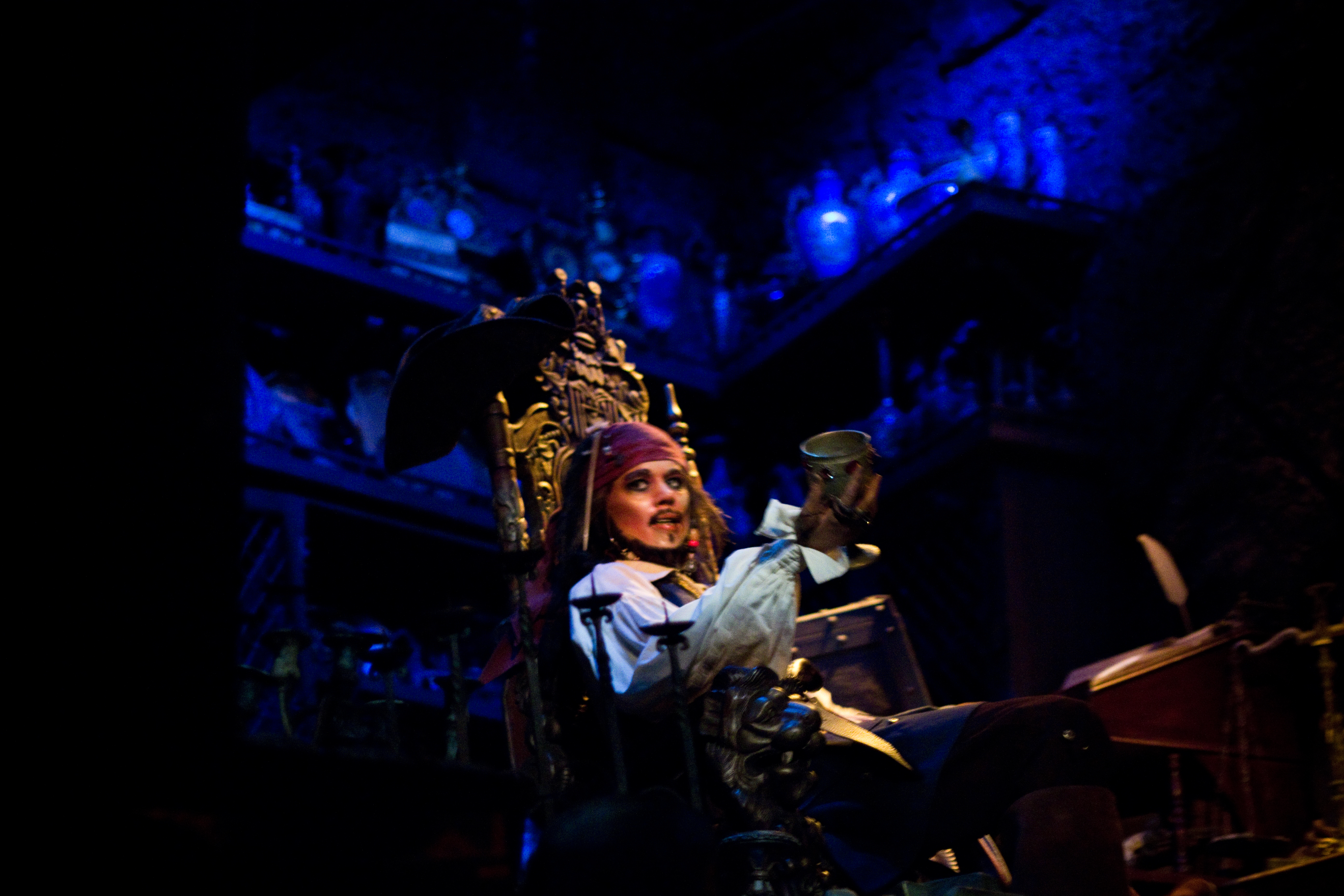
Audio-Animatronics figure of Jack Sparrow (2006–present), in Pirates of the Caribbean at Disneyland

The system of the animatronics relies on a combination of electric motors, solenoids, hydraulic systems, pneumatic systems, and cables to produce repeatable puppet movements that sync to sound.

Pneumatic actuators are powerful enough to move heavier objects like simulated limbs, while hydraulics are used more for large figures. For example, on/off type movement would cause an arm to be lifted either up over an animatronic's head or down next to its body, but with no halting or change of speed in between. To create more realistic movement in large figures, an analog system was used. This gave the figures' body parts a fully fluid range of motion, rather than two positions.

To permit a high degree of freedom, the control cylinders resemble typical miniature pneumatic or hydraulic cylinders, but mount the back of the cylinder on a ball joint and threaded rod. This ball joint permits the cylinders to float freely inside the frame, such as when the wrist joint rotates and flexes.

The oil-filled cylinders occasionally drip or leak, so it is sometimes necessary to do makeup touch-up work, or to strip the clothing off a figure due to leaking fluids inside. The Enchanted Tiki Room remains a pneumatic theatrical set, primarily due to the leakage concerns, as the Audio-Animatronic figures are above the audience's heads.

Because each individual cylinder requires its own control channel, the original Audio-Animatronic figures were relatively simple in design, to reduce the number of channels required. For example, the first human designs (referred to internally by Disney as series A-1) included all four fingers of the hand as one actuator. It could wave its hand but it could not grasp or point at something. With modern digital computers controlling the device, the number of channels is virtually unlimited, allowing more complex, realistic motion. The current versions (series A-100) now have individual actuators for each finger. Disney also introduced a brand new figure that is used in Star Wars: Galaxy's Edge and is referred to as the A1000.

From 1979 to 1981, Disney developed a second generation Audio-Animatronics show data generation system to support existing show updates and projects like Tokyo Disneyland and EPCOT, called Digital Animation Control System (DACS). The main components of the new DACS were a Data General Eclipse S250 minicomputer and a custom-built Animator's Console. The system enabled an animator to incrementally generate up to 1000 channels of show data synchronized with a sound track, using the Animator's Console remotely located in front of a show stage. Each channel was either an analog control or up to eight separate digital sub-channels for the show's animated figures and controllable features. A completed show dataset was compressed from magnetic tape backup to a single 2MB disk file for repetitive playback by a smaller dedicated Show Control Unit.

=== Compliance ===
Compliance is a new technology that allows faster, more realistic movements without sacrificing control. In the older figures, a fast limb movement would cause the entire figure to shake in an unnatural way. The Imagineers thus had to program slower movements, sacrificing speed in order to gain control. This was frustrating for the animators, who, in many cases, wanted faster movements. Compliance improves this situation by allowing limbs to continue past the points where they are programmed to stop; they then return quickly to the "intended" position, much as real organic body parts do. The various elements also slow to a stop at their various positions, instead of using the immediate stops that caused the unwanted shaking. This absorbs shock, much like the shock absorbers on a car or the natural shock absorption in a living body.

=== Cosmetics ===
The skin of an Audio-Animatronics human figure is made from silicone rubber. Because the neck is so much narrower than the rest of the skull, the skull skin cover has a zipper up the back to permit easy removal. The facial appearance is painted onto the rubber, and standard cosmetic makeup is also used. Over time, the flexing causes the paint to loosen and fall off, so occasional makeup work and repainting are required.

Generally as the rubber skin flexes, the stress causes it to dry and begin to crack. Figures that do not have a high degree of motion flexibility, such as the older A-1 series for President Lincoln, may only need to have their skin replaced every ten years. The most recent A-100 series human AAs, like the figure of President Barack Obama, also include flexion actuators that move the cheeks and eyebrows to permit more realistic expressions; however, the skin wears out more quickly and needs replacement at least every five years.

The wig on each human figure is made from natural human hair for the highest degree of realism, although the use of real hair requires touch-ups, since the changing humidity and constant rapid motions of the moving AA carriage hardware causes the hair to slowly lose its styling.

=== Autonomatronics ===
Autonomatronics is a registered trademark for a more advanced Audio-Animatronic technology, also created by Walt Disney Imagineers.

The original Audio-Animatronics used hydraulics to operate robotic figures to present a pre-programmed show. This more sophisticated technology can include cameras and other sensors feeding signals to a computer, which processes the information and makes choices about what to say and do. In September 2009, Disney debuted "Otto", the first interactive figure that could hear, see and sense actions in the room. Otto could hold conversations and react to the audience.

In December 2009, Great Moments with Mr. Lincoln returned to Disneyland using the new Autonomatronics technology.

=== Stuntronics ===
Spider-Man stunt show at Avengers Campus at Disney California Adventure, featuring a Stuntronic

In June 2018, it was revealed that Disney Imagineering had created autonomous, self-correcting aerial stunt robots called stuntronics. This new extension of animatronics utilizes onboard sensors for precision control of advanced robotics to create animatronic human stunt doubles that can perform advanced aerial movements, such as flips and twists.

== Variations ==
The Audio-Animatronics figures at Disney's theme parks around the world vary in their sophistication. Current technologies have paved the way for more elaborate figures, such as the swordfighting pirates in Pirates of the Caribbean at Disneyland Park Paris, the lava monster in Journey to the Center of the Earth at Tokyo DisneySea, the Na'vi Shaman in Na'vi River Journey at Disney's Animal Kingdom, Scooter in Rock 'n' Roller Coaster Starring The Muppets at Disney's Hollywood Studios, and Roz in Monsters, Inc. Mike & Sulley to the Rescue! at Disney California Adventure and Monsters, Inc. Ride & Go Seek at Tokyo Disneyland.

The Roz figure is able to interact with guests with help from an unseen operator who chooses pre-recorded messages for Roz to speak, thereby seeming to react to individual guests' unique appearances and clothing. The Mr. Potato Head figures at the Toy Story Mania! attractions at Disney California Adventure, Disney's Hollywood Studios, and Tokyo DisneySea do the same.

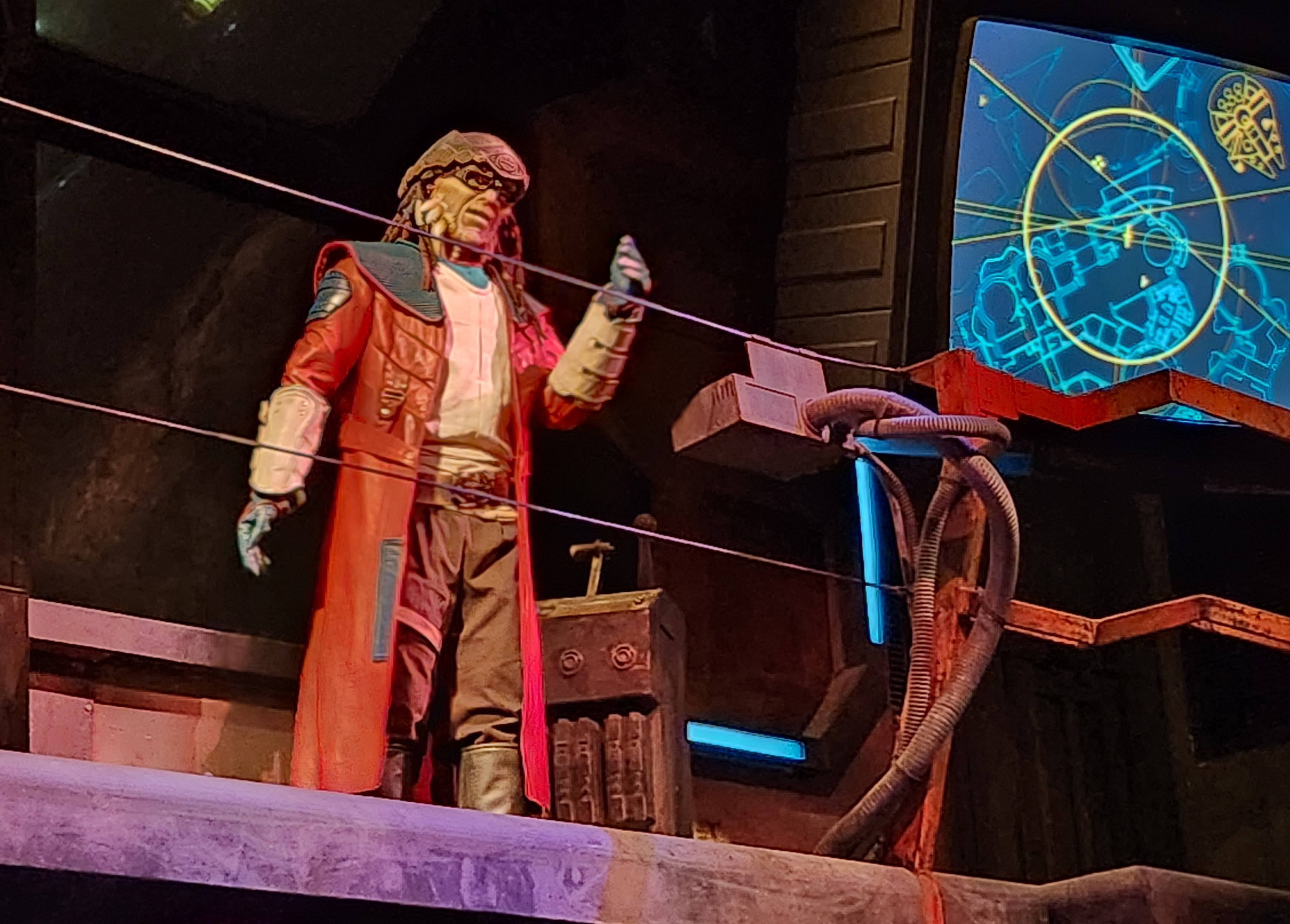
An Audio-Animatronics figure of Hondo Ohnaka in the preshow of Millennium Falcon – Smugglers Run at Disneyland

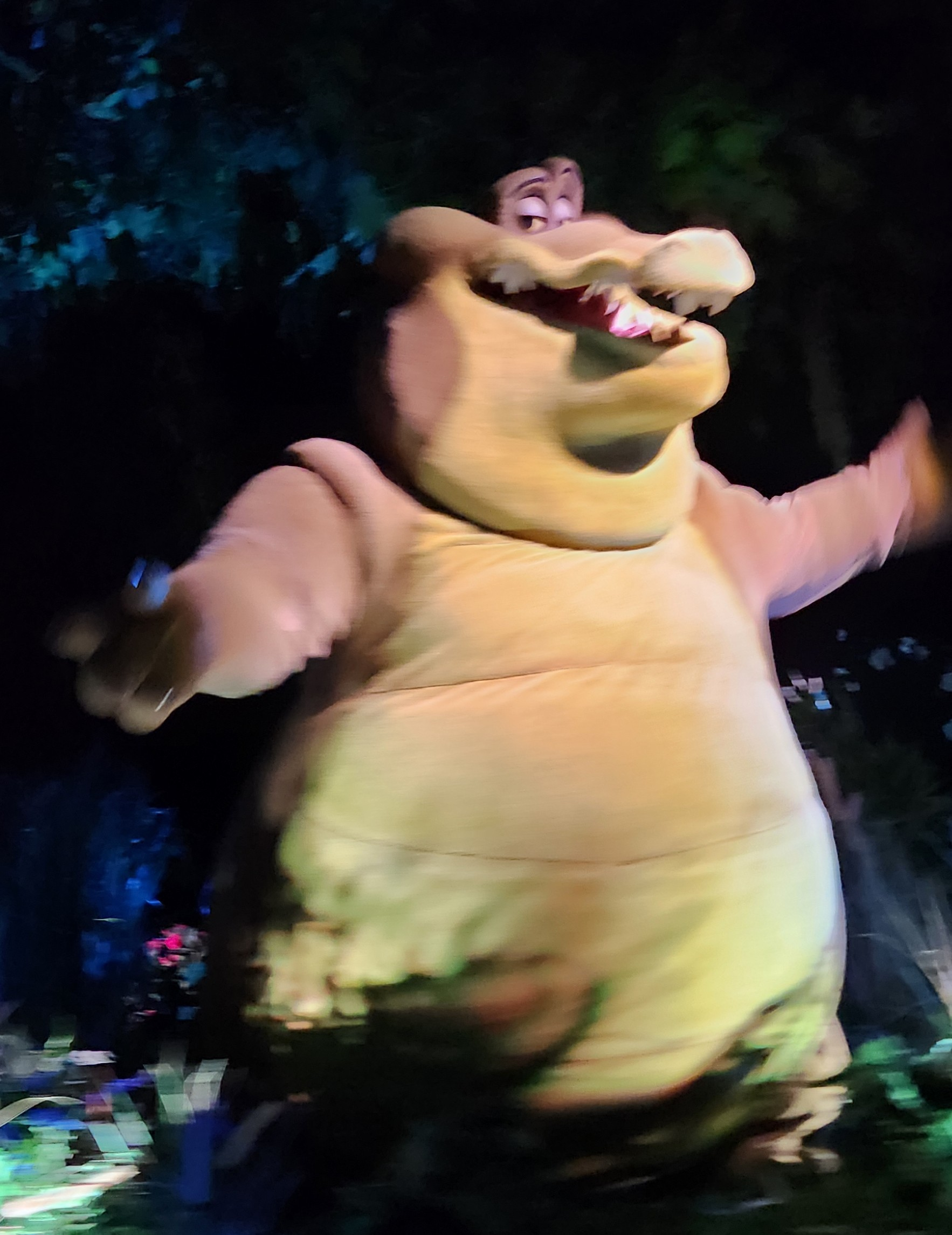
An Audio-Animatronics figure of Louis the alligator in Tiana's Bayou Adventure at Disneyland

In 2006, the Pirates of the Caribbean attraction was updated at Disneyland and Magic Kingdom to include characters from the Pirates of the Caribbean film series, such as Jack Sparrow. The Jack Sparrow figure is based on the actor that portrays him, Johnny Depp, and features his voice. The figure of Abraham Lincoln at Great Moments with Mr. Lincoln at Disneyland can move his lips to form words and portray emotions to match what he is saying.

The anglerfish figure inside The Seas with Nemo & Friends in Epcot is connected to a robotic arm to make it appear that the anglerfish is actually swimming.

The Audio-Animatronic Indiana Jones figures inside Indiana Jones Adventure: Temple of the Forbidden Eye and Temple of the Crystal Skull at Disneyland and Tokyo DisneySea respectively, resemble Indiana Jones actor Harrison Ford.

In the Buzz Lightyear attractions at Magic Kingdom, Disneyland, and Disneyland Park Paris, the Audio-Animatronics figures of Buzz Lightyear use projections for their faces to make Buzz's mouth move and eyes blink. Projected face technology is also used for the Hatbox Ghost in The Haunted Mansion at Disneyland and Magic Kingdom, the dwarfs in Seven Dwarfs Mine Train at Magic Kingdom and Shanghai Disneyland, and the cursed pirate in Pirates of the Caribbean at Disneyland. Using next-generation projection mapping technology, the pirate figure appears to transform into a skeleton.

The Audio-Animatronics figures in Star Wars: Galaxy's Edge at Disneyland and Disney's Hollywood Studios are known as A-1000 Animatronics, such as Hondo Ohnaka in the Millennium Falcon – Smugglers Run attraction. These figures have a fully functional face, featuring a full range of motion in the eyes and mouth.

In 2025, a new show debuted at Disneyland called Walt Disney – A Magical Life, which features an Audio-Animatronics figure of Walt Disney.

== Society ==
Society has a large effect on how Audio-Animatronics evolve over time in theme parks. At Disney Parks, Audio-Animatronics are constantly being removed and installed based on current tastes and the changing of generations. Some attractions like The Hall of Presidents in Magic Kingdom are affected when it comes to events in society as every time there is a new U.S. president they are added to the attraction.

== Gallery ==
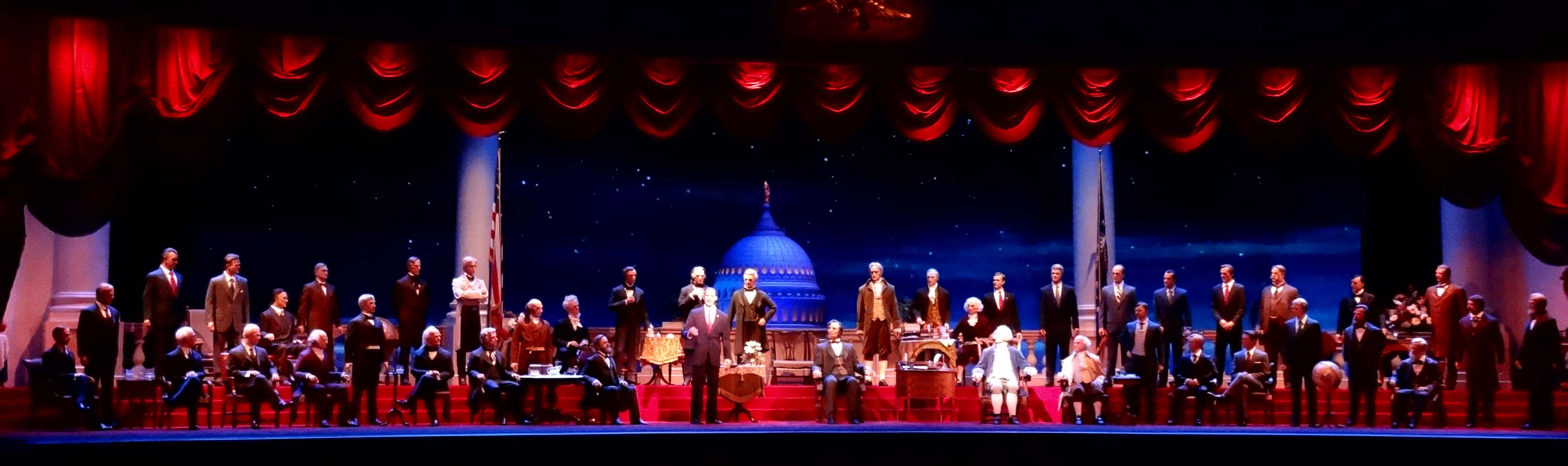
The Hall of Presidents in 2011 at Magic Kingdom

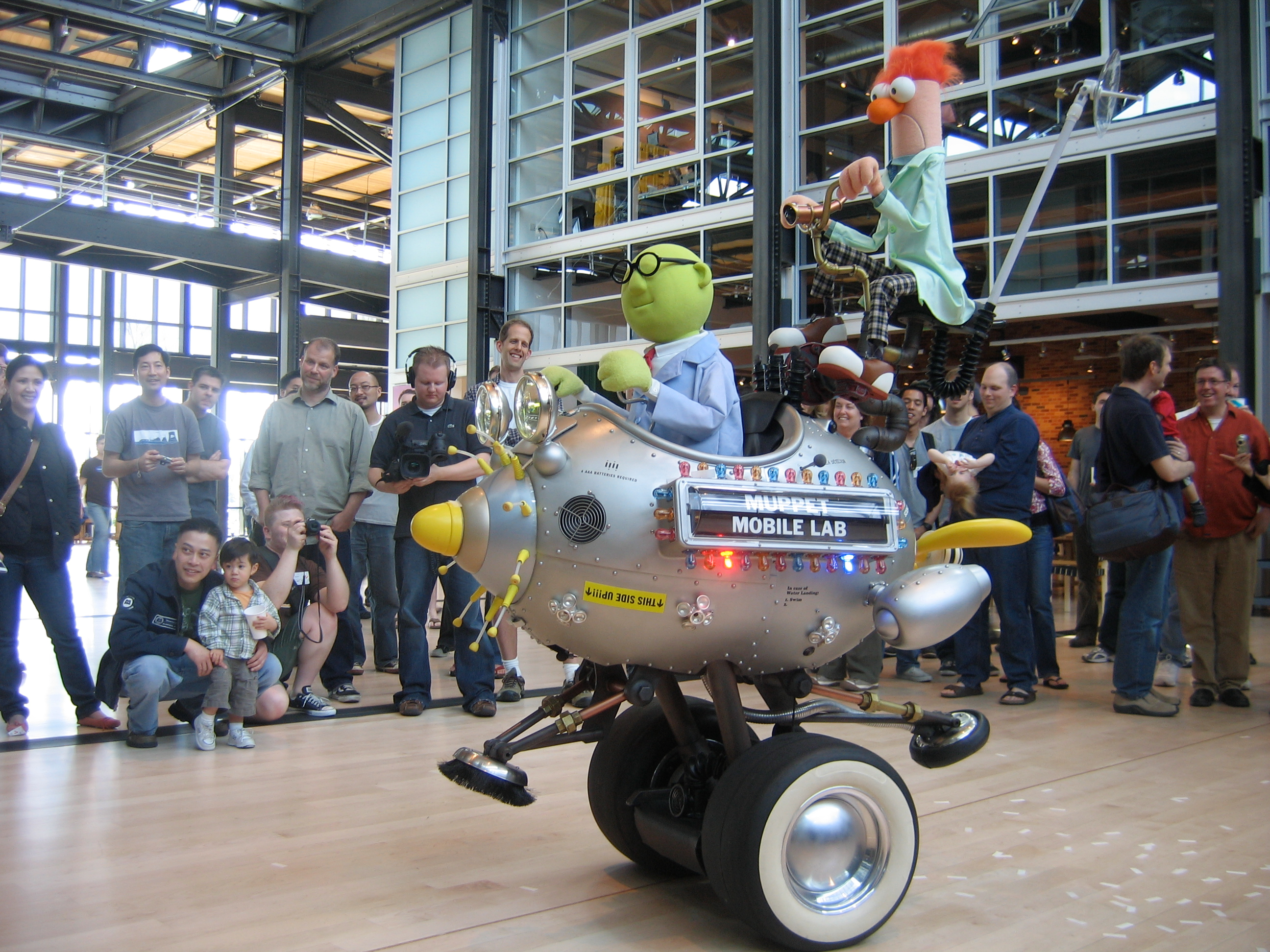
Muppet Mobile Lab, featuring Bunsen and Beaker, during a visit to Pixar in 2007. Pixar's chief creative officer Pete Docter can be seen above the vehicle's headlights.

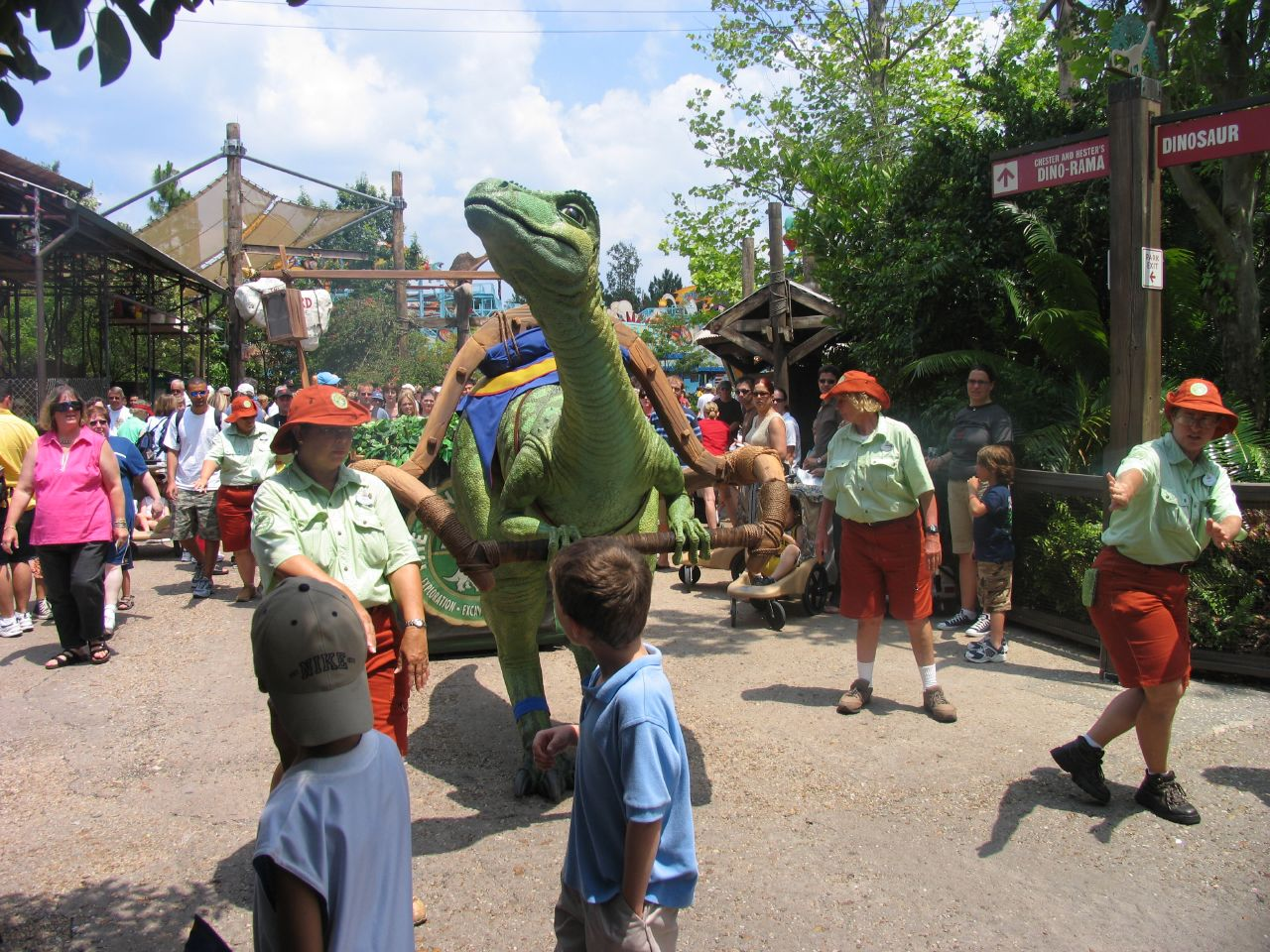
Lucky the Dinosaur in Disney's Animal Kingdom in 2005

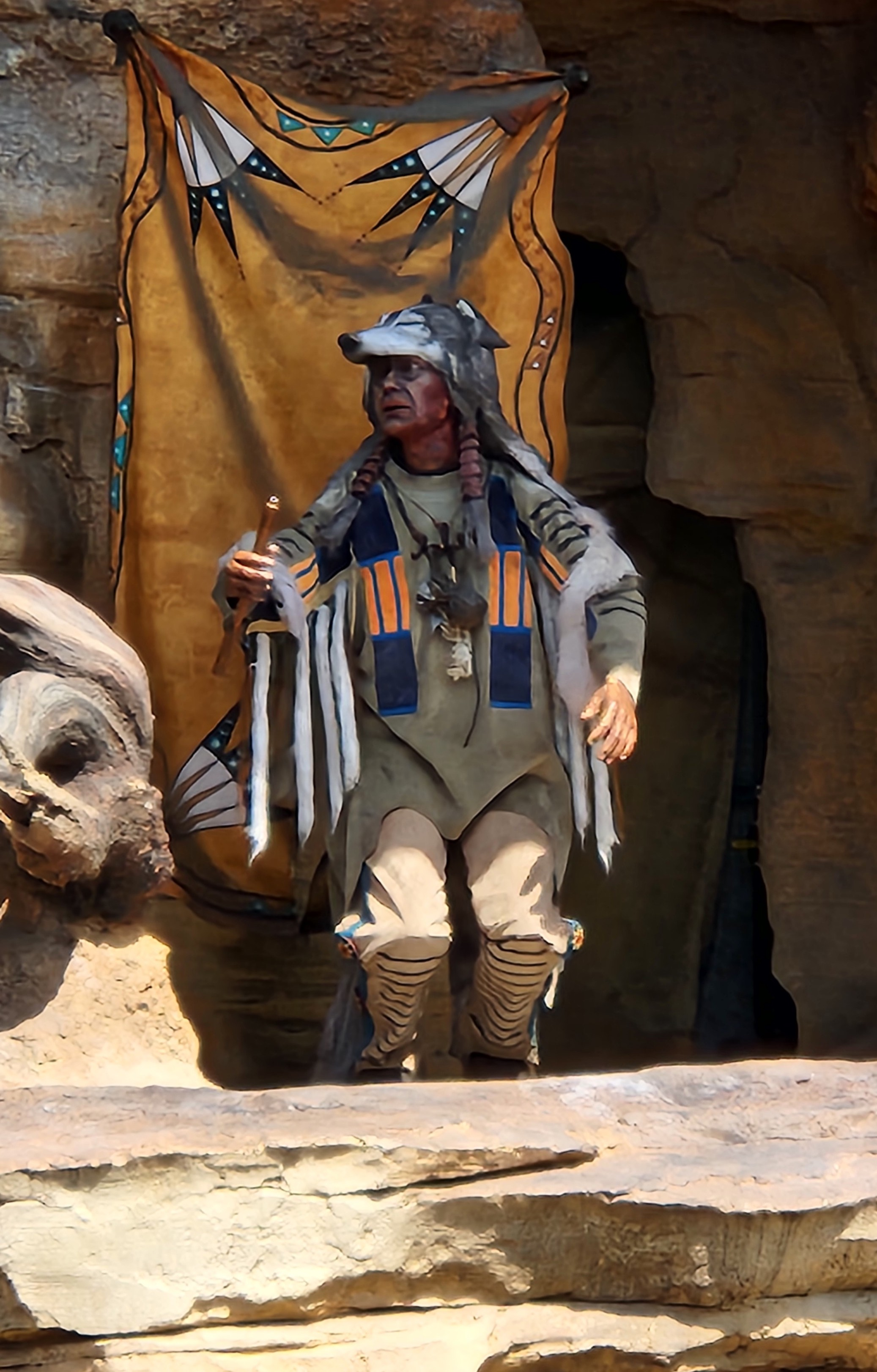
Plains Indian Shaman as seen along the Rivers of America at Disneyland

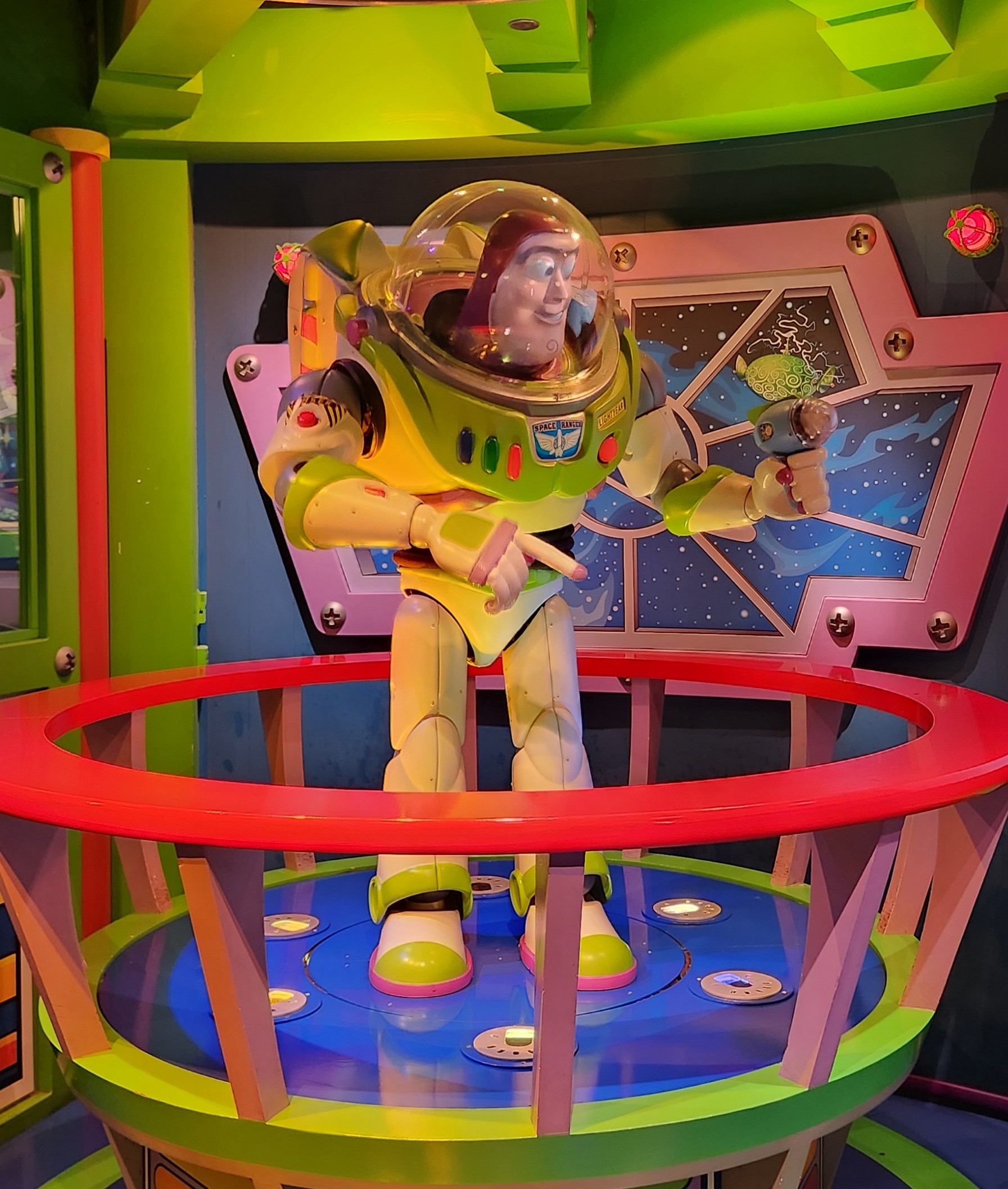
Buzz Lightyear in the queue of Buzz Lightyear Astro Blasters at Disneyland

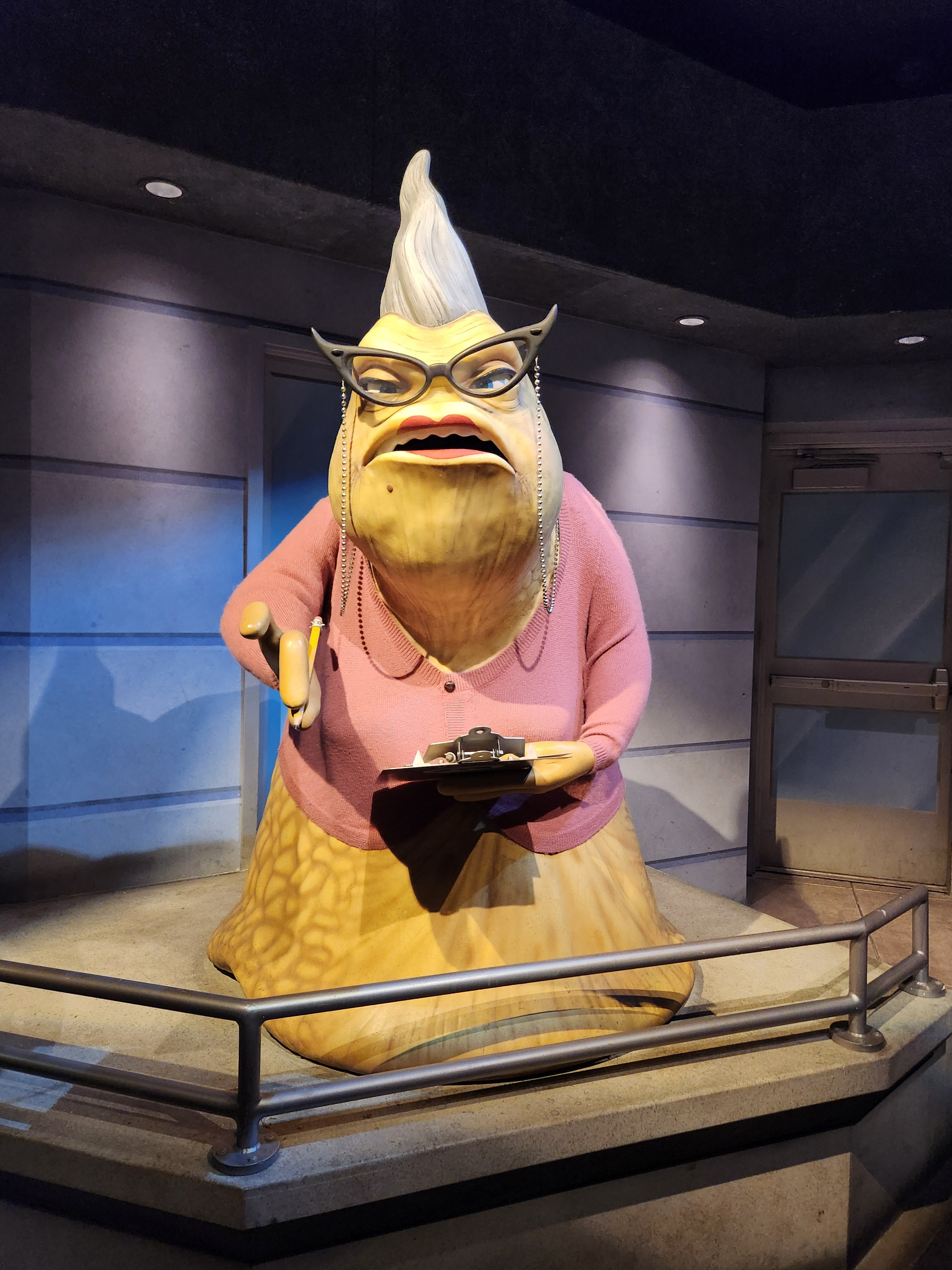
Roz in Monsters, Inc. Mike & Sulley to the Rescue! at Disney California Adventure

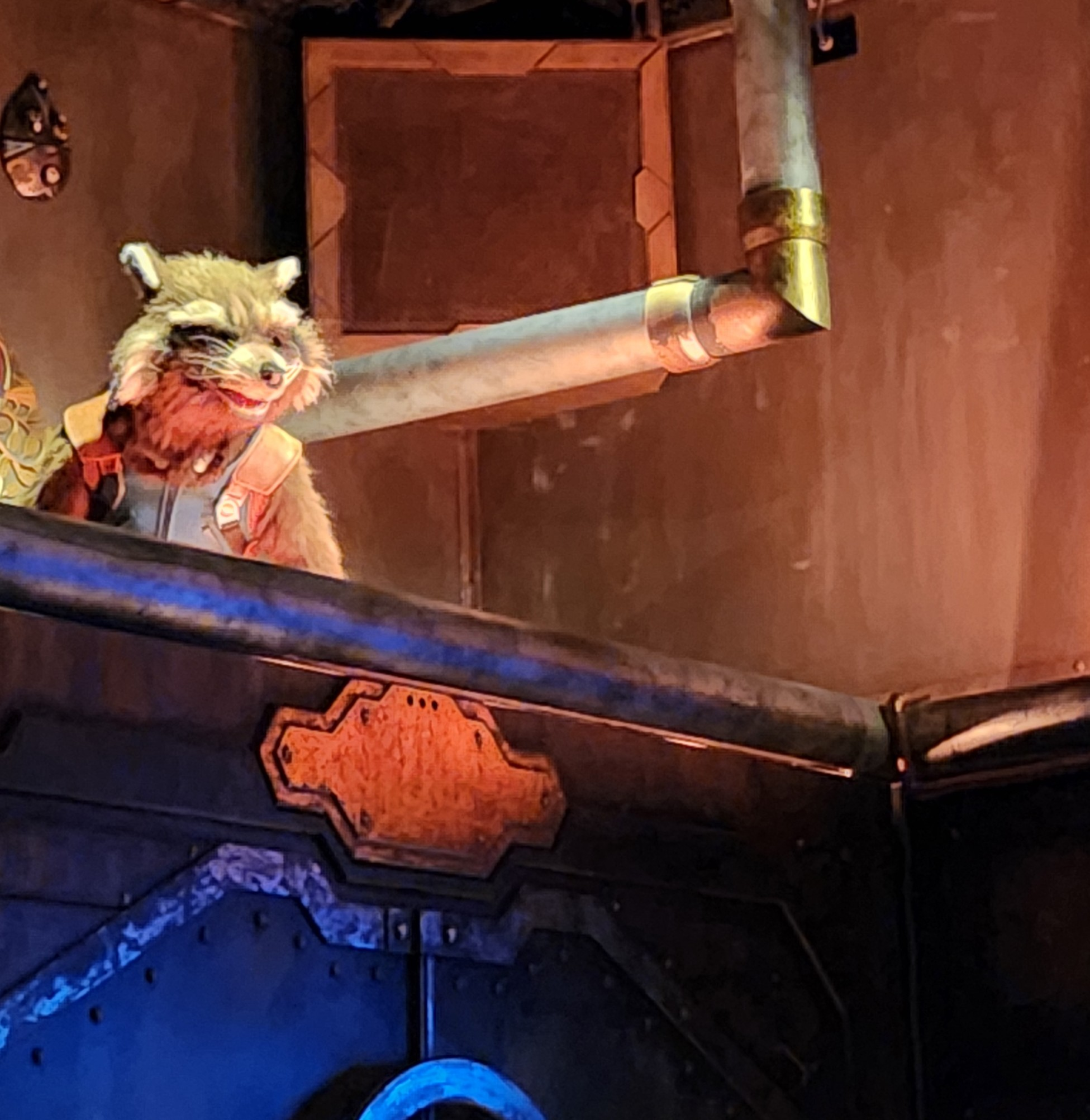
Rocket in the preshow of Guardians of the Galaxy – Mission: Breakout! at Disney California Adventure

== In popular culture ==
- Less-sophisticated forms of audio-animatronics also gained popularity in the 1980s through use at family entertainment centers such as ShowBiz Pizza Place and Chuck E. Cheese's. At ShowBiz, The Rock-afire Explosion band was made by Aaron Fechter and Creative Engineering, who also made other animatronic characters and arcade redemption games. They are also used in film and television special effects.
- Several passengers and the crew of a Pioneer Zephyr are represented in a display of this historic train at Chicago's Museum of Science and Industry. Neatly dressed in the proper style of first class passengers of their era, one remarks upon the casual dress of the visitors.
- The George Washington Masonic National Memorial features an animatronic George Washington.
- John Wardley is often said to have brought animatronics to the United Kingdom, utilizing a concept called Ramped Movement, which allowed for smoother movements of the figures. John appeared on Tomorrow's World in the 1970s showing a guitar playing animatronic programmed to music. His first project was the creation of the animated show "50 Glorious Years" for Tussaud's "Royalty and Empire Exhibition" at Windsor.
- Scissor Sisters member Ana Matronic named herself after animatronics, as a homage to her love of The Bionic Woman.
- The Pennsylvania Lottery uses an animatronic groundhog named Gus (who refers to himself as the "second-most-famous groundhog in Pennsylvania", after Punxsutawney Phil) as the mascot for television commercials for their instant scratch-off games.
- Disney's 2015 film Tomorrowland uses the Audio-Animatronics word as a term for their sophisticated android characters.

== See also ==
- List of Disney attractions using Audio-Animatronics
