= Lucky the Dinosaur =

Segnosaurus free roaming figure

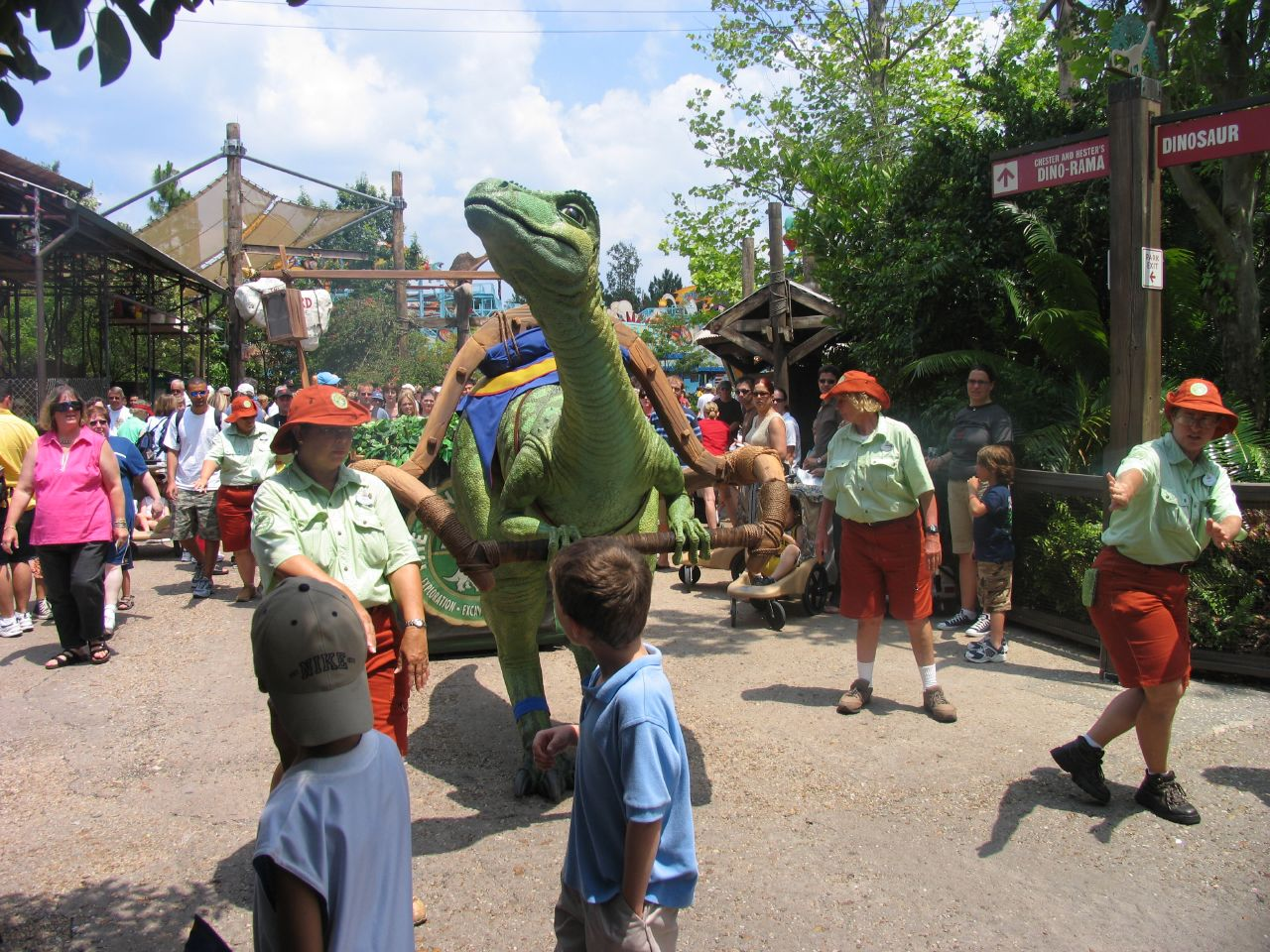
Lucky the Dinosaur at Disney's Animal Kingdom in 2005

Lucky the Dinosaur is an approximately 8-foot-tall (2.4 m) green Segnosaurus free roaming Audio-Animatronics figure which pulls a flower-covered cart and is led by "Chandler the Dinosaur Handler". Lucky premiered at The Natural History Museum of Los Angeles on August 28, 2003. He made appearances at Disney California Adventure Park as well. Lucky appeared regularly at the DinoLand U.S.A. area of Disney's Animal Kingdom at Walt Disney World from June 2005 to August 2005. He was then moved to Hong Kong Disneyland to celebrate the grand opening of the park in September 2005. As of August 2015, Lucky is at his final home of Walt Disney Imagineering. He is still running as he meets visitors who come with the Backstage Magic Tour from Adventures By Disney.

Lucky is notable in that he was the first free roaming Audio-Animatronics figure ever created by Disney's Imagineers. The flower cart he pulls conceals the computer and power source. Lucky is capable of moving, vocalizing, and responding to guests.

== See also ==
- Disney's Animal Kingdom attraction and entertainment history
- Hong Kong Disneyland attraction and entertainment history
- Muppet Mobile Lab
