= Muppet Mobile Lab =

Attraction at Disney parks

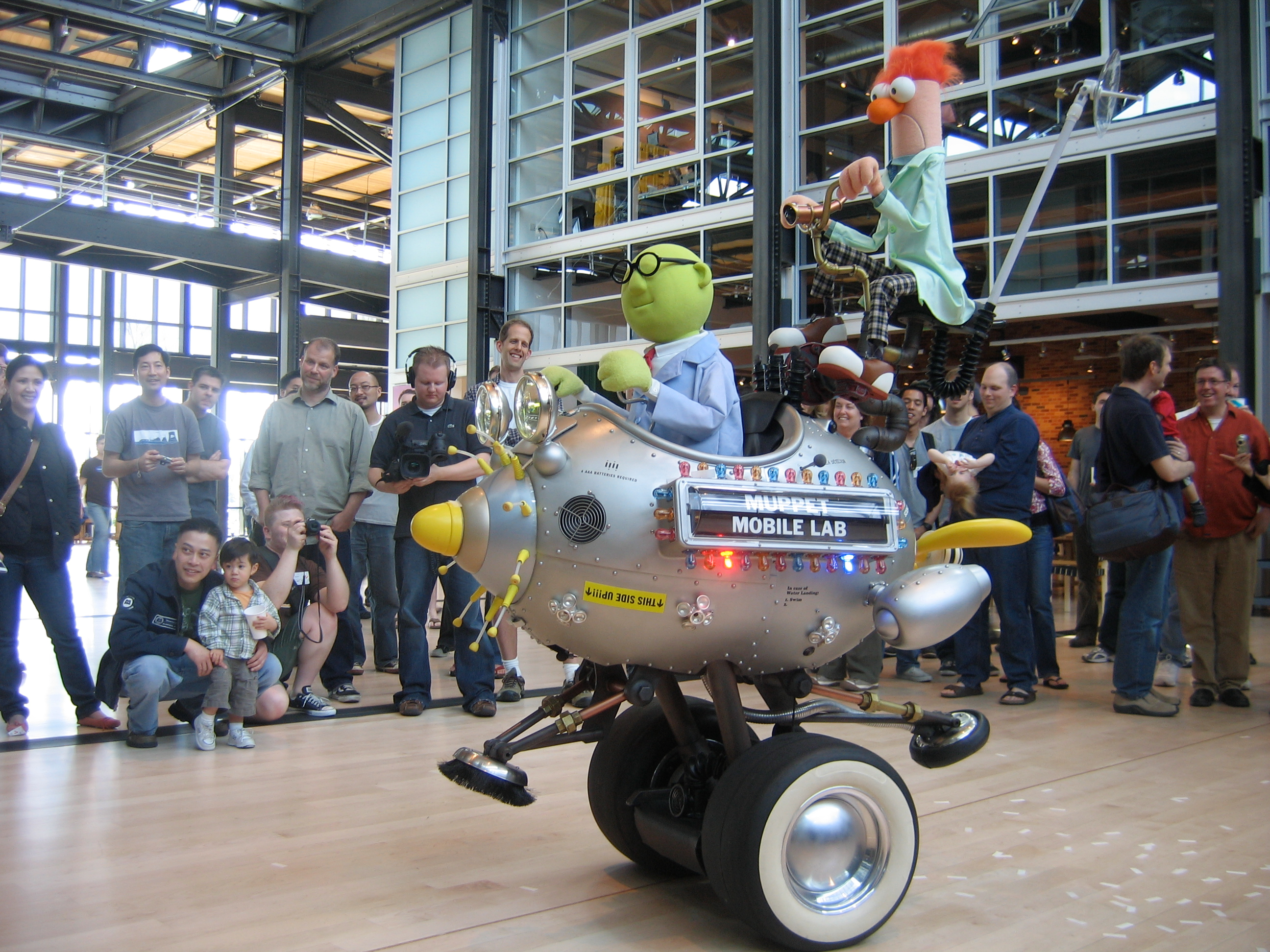
The Muppet Mobile Lab pictured during a visit to Pixar Animation Studios in 2007.

Muppet Mobile Lab was a free-roving, Audio-Animatronics entertainment attraction designed by Walt Disney Imagineering, that was tested at Disney California Adventure in Anaheim, California, at Walt Disney World in Orlando, Florida and at Hong Kong Disneyland in Hong Kong.

Implemented on a Segway platform, the Muppet Mobile Lab is a two-wheeled science-lab vehicle that resembles a small rocket ship. Two Muppet characters, Dr. Bunsen Honeydew and his assistant, Beaker, piloted the vehicle through the park, interacting with guests and deploying special effects such as foggers, flashing lights, moving signs, confetti cannons and spray jets.

The two animatronics characters and the special effects aboard the vehicle were controlled remotely by puppeteers, thanks to an advanced control system that allowed the controllers to be located up to several miles away from the show location. On-board cameras, microphones and speakers allowed the puppeteers to see and hear guests and interact with them. Muppet performers Dave Goelz (Bunsen) and Steve Whitmire (Beaker) assisted in the development of the project.

The project began as a continuation of Disney's "Living Character Initiative", a program that has generated other interactive shows at Disney theme parks including Lucky the Dinosaur, Turtle Talk with Crush, Monsters, Inc. Laugh Floor, and Stitch Encounter.

In 2009, the attraction was honored with the Thea Award for Outstanding Achievement (Technical) from the Themed Entertainment Association.

In October 2016, the Muppet Mobile Lab returned to Epcot for a limited time.

The attraction was confirmed to be retired in 2026. The vehicle is currently on display (with animatronics removed) in the loading platform of Rock 'n' Roller Coaster Starting The Muppets at Disney's Hollywood Studios.
