= Glow in the Park Halloween Parade =

Defunct parade at Hong Kong Disneyland

Hong Kong Disneyland
- Status: Removed
- Opening date: September 24, 2007
- Closing date: October 31, 2013
- Replaced by: Paint the Night Parade

Ride statistics
- Attraction type: Parade
- Hosted by: Jack Skellington

Glow in the Park Halloween Parade (Traditional Chinese: 夜光鬼魅巡遊) was a parade held during the Disney's Haunted Halloween event in Hong Kong Disneyland. It originally featured seven brand-new floats, over 100 cast members, and eight newly introduced characters, including Jack Skellington from The Nightmare Before Christmas. Some of the Disney Villains who appeared in the parade. The parade is an exclusive entertainment shown every evening during the Haunted Halloween event.

The parade made its debut on 24 September 2007. It returned on the 25 September 2008 as part of the Disney's Haunted Halloween event with a new finale of the ghost pirate ship float. The Headless Horseman was featured in the prequel of the parade in the 2011 Halloween event. Since then, the parade has been running in each Halloween event until late 2013.
