= PeopleMover (Magic Kingdom) =

Attraction at Walt Disney World

Tomorrowland Transit Authority PeopleMover

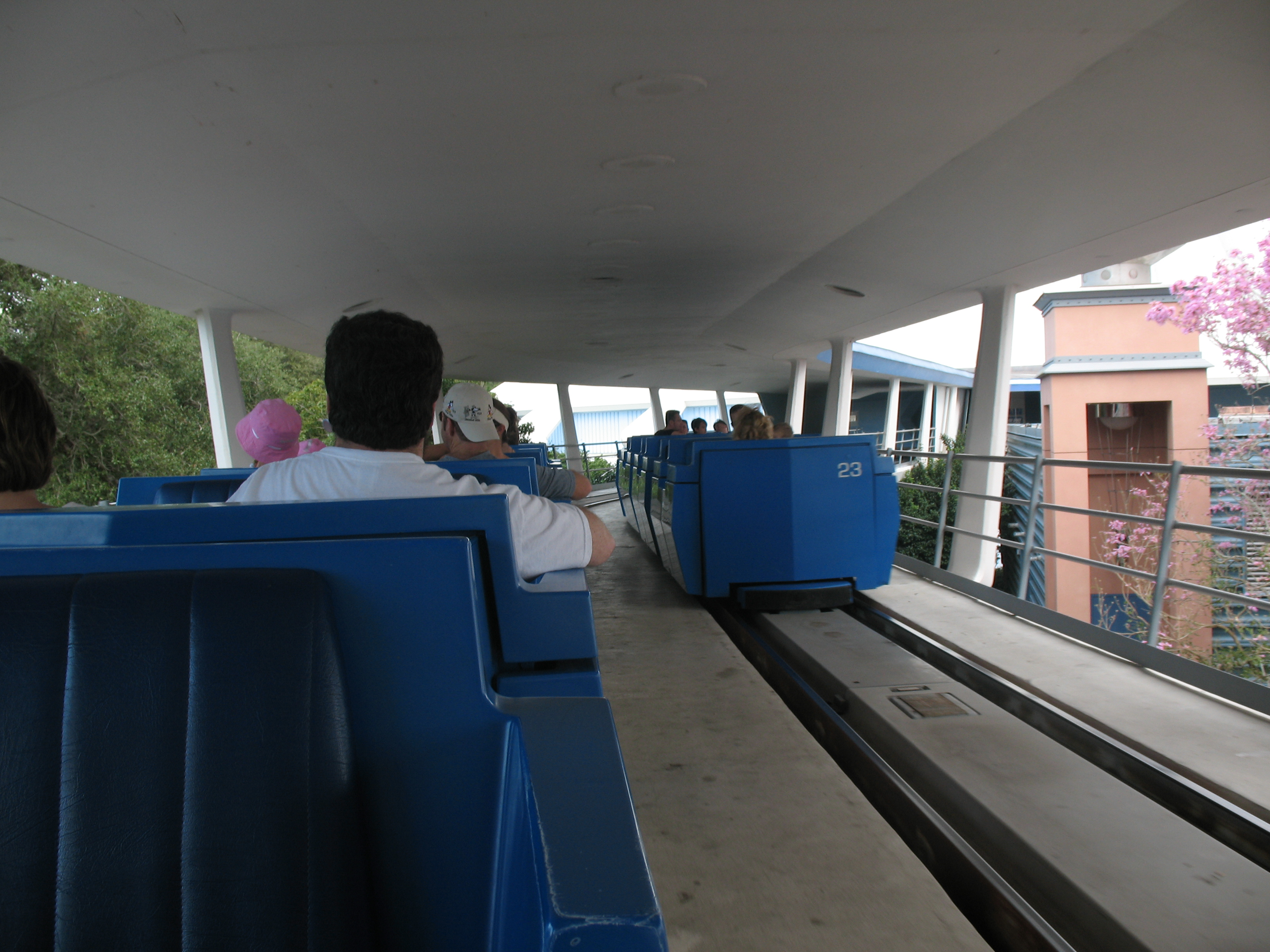
- The TTA PeopleMover's double-track section at the entrance to Space Mountain in July 30, 2007.

Magic Kingdom
- Area: Tomorrowland
- Coordinates: 28°25′06″N 81°34′45″W
- Status: Operating
- Opening date: July 1, 1975

Ride statistics
- Attraction type: People mover
- Manufacturer: Walt Disney Imagineering
- Designer: WED Enterprises
- Length: 5,484 ft (1,672 m)
- Speed: 6.8 mph (10.9 km/h)
- Capacity: 3,600 riders per hour
- Vehicle type: 5-car rail vehicles
- Vehicles: 21
- Riders per vehicle: 20-30
- Rows: 2 per car, 10 per train
- Riders per row: 2-3
- Duration: 10:00
- Host: Jack Wagner (1975–1985); ORAC-1 Commuter Computer (Ronnie Schell) (1985–1994); TTA Central Announcer (Pete Renaday) (1994–October 2009); Mike Brassell (October 2009–July 2022); B.J. Ward (safety voice) (October 2009–present); ORAC-5 (Stephen Stanton) (July 2022–present)
- Propulsion: Linear induction motors embedded in track
- Platform speed: 1.84 mph
- Motor count: 569 (mainline); 640 (total)
- Previous names: WEDway PeopleMover (July 1, 1975 – June 11, 1994); Tomorrowland Transit Authority (June 12, 1994 – October 1, 2009); Tomorrowland Transit Authority PeopleMover (October 2, 2009 – present; name still used on WDW website, Magic Kingdom guide maps, and some old signage)
- Sponsor: Enterprise Rent-A-Car
- Closed captioning available

The Tomorrowland Transit Authority PeopleMover (Note: Formerly known as the WEDway PeopleMover from 1975 until 1994 and the Tomorrowland Transit Authority from 1994 until 2010.) is an attraction in Tomorrowland in the Magic Kingdom at Walt Disney World Resort in Bay Lake, Florida. Designed as an urban mass-transit system of the future, vehicles take passengers on a grand circle tour of the realm of Tomorrowland that provides elevated views of several other attractions.

== Ride experience ==
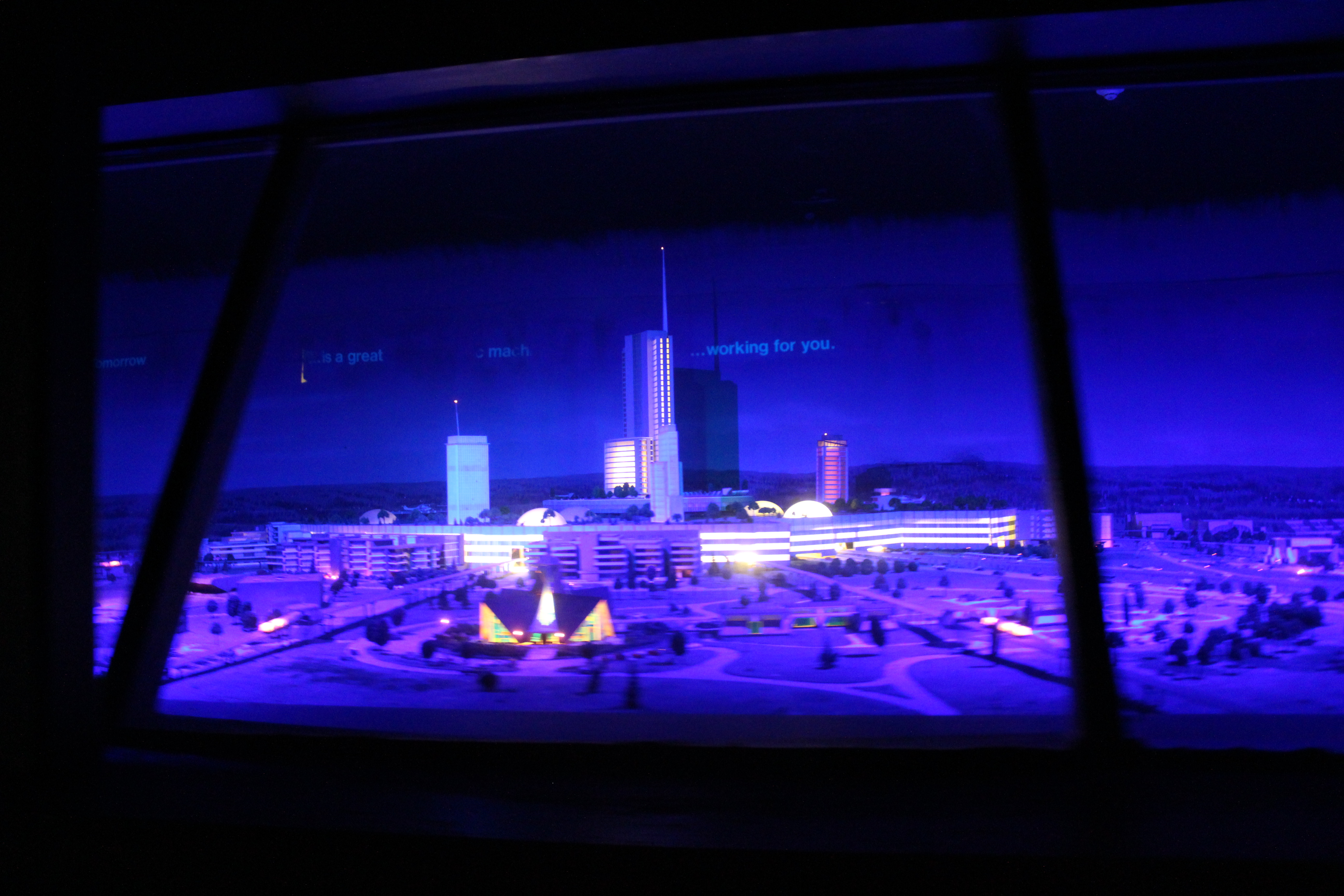
The early concept model for Epcot seen during the ride

The attraction has a single station, which resides in the center of Rocket Tower Plaza and beneath the Astro Orbiter. Passing the queue, passengers step onto the Speedramp (inclined moving walkway) to the second level. They then step onto a moving platform which matches the speed of the PeopleMover trains, and board before they depart the station.

Leaving the Rocket Tower Plaza Station, the trains make a sharp left turn, followed by a sweeping turn over the plaza. The track then makes a right-hand turn, running along the outside of the northern show building and above the former queue for Stitch's Great Escape! (Note: Stitch's Great Escape! permanently closed after January 6, 2018, although it was not declared permanent until July 2020.) and passing by the Tomorrowland main entrance at Central Plaza. The track enters a tunnel through the northern show building and passes a large diorama containing a portion of the Progress City/"Epcot" model, which originally resided in the upper level of the Carousel of Progress at the New York World's Fair of 1964-1965 and at Disneyland starting in 1967-1973, before encountering a diorama of two robots and crossing the Star Traders shop.

Leaving the northern show building, the ride passes over the walkway to Fantasyland, the Tomorrowland Speedway, and access to the Tron Lightcycle Power Run. Afterwards, the ride crosses the Walt Disney World Railroad tracks and pass through a switch, which leads to the ride's storage and maintenance bays as they make a right turn to enter Space Mountain. Inside Space Mountain, the trains then make a left turn and pass in between the lift hills of the roller coaster tracks. The vehicles then pass two lighted signs reading "Starport: Seven Five" (an oblique reference to the opening year of the attraction), before open space to the left allows a view down into the post-show dioramas. After the view of the post-show, the track makes a right turn, wrapping around the Omega track's loading station, and travels along the back side of the building, which is in complete pitch black darkness. It is possible to look up and see the projections from the ride and the tracks. The trains make a sharp S-turn to merge with the storage track, and run along the outside of the building perimeter to return to the railroad bridge. The Space Mountain segment of the PeopleMover has gained heavy notoriety among park guests for offering an accessible view of Space Mountain when the interior work lights are on. Because the two attractions have separate operating systems, the PeopleMover does not have to stop during Space Mountain breakdowns, so guests riding the PeopleMover when the work lights are on get a rare illuminated look at the roller coaster tracks.

After crossing the railroad tracks again, the trains backtrack to a point above the Tomorrowland Speedway before turning south. After passing over Space Mountain's entrance plaza, the former Skyway terminal and the restrooms, the track travels along the exterior of Walt Disney's Carousel of Progress, before crossing over the former Galaxy Palace Theater entrance and entering the south show building. Entering the building, guests pass a diorama of a futuristic salon and then get a view down into Buzz Lightyear's Space Ranger Spin, similar to the one given of Star Traders. Exiting the tunnel, the ride travels along the side of the south show building, and passing by Main Street U.S.A., the Tomorrowland sign entrance and the Cinderella Castle again, and above the queue line for Monsters, Inc. Laugh Floor, and the queue line for Buzz Lightyear's Space Ranger Spin. The ride then returns to Rocket Tower Plaza, where guests disembark and unload.

== Operation ==
The attraction uses on the WEDway system, and consists of five-car trains of constantly-moving four-passenger vehicles which are passively propelled by drive units in the track rather than motors within the vehicles themselves. The trains slow down and ride bumper-to-bumper through the station, where passengers board and alight via a large speed-matched rotating platform.

The ride follows a level 4,573-foot-long (1,394 m) mainline track (5,484 feet (1,672 m) including maintenance and storage areas). There are 569 drive units embedded in the track, plus an additional 71 in the storage and maintenance areas, spaced approximately one every 10 feet (3.0 m). The spacing decreases to 5 feet (1.5 m) in the station and 2.5 feet (0.76 m) in acceleration zones, and there is an extra drive unit every 40 feet (12 m) for redundancy. The drive units consist of 10-by-15-inch (250 mm × 380 mm) linear induction motor "primaries" which operate off of 240 volts and 60 Hertz. The "secondaries" of the motors on the trains consist of a 1/8-inch-thick (3.2 mm) aluminum plate backed by a 3/16-inch-thick (4.8 mm) steel plate that ride 0.15 inches (3.8 mm) above the drive units. Trains travel at a speed of 10 feet per second (3.0 m/s), slowing down to 3–4 feet per second (0.91–1.22 m/s) in the three show scenes.

== History ==
=== Wedway PeopleMover (1975–1994) ===
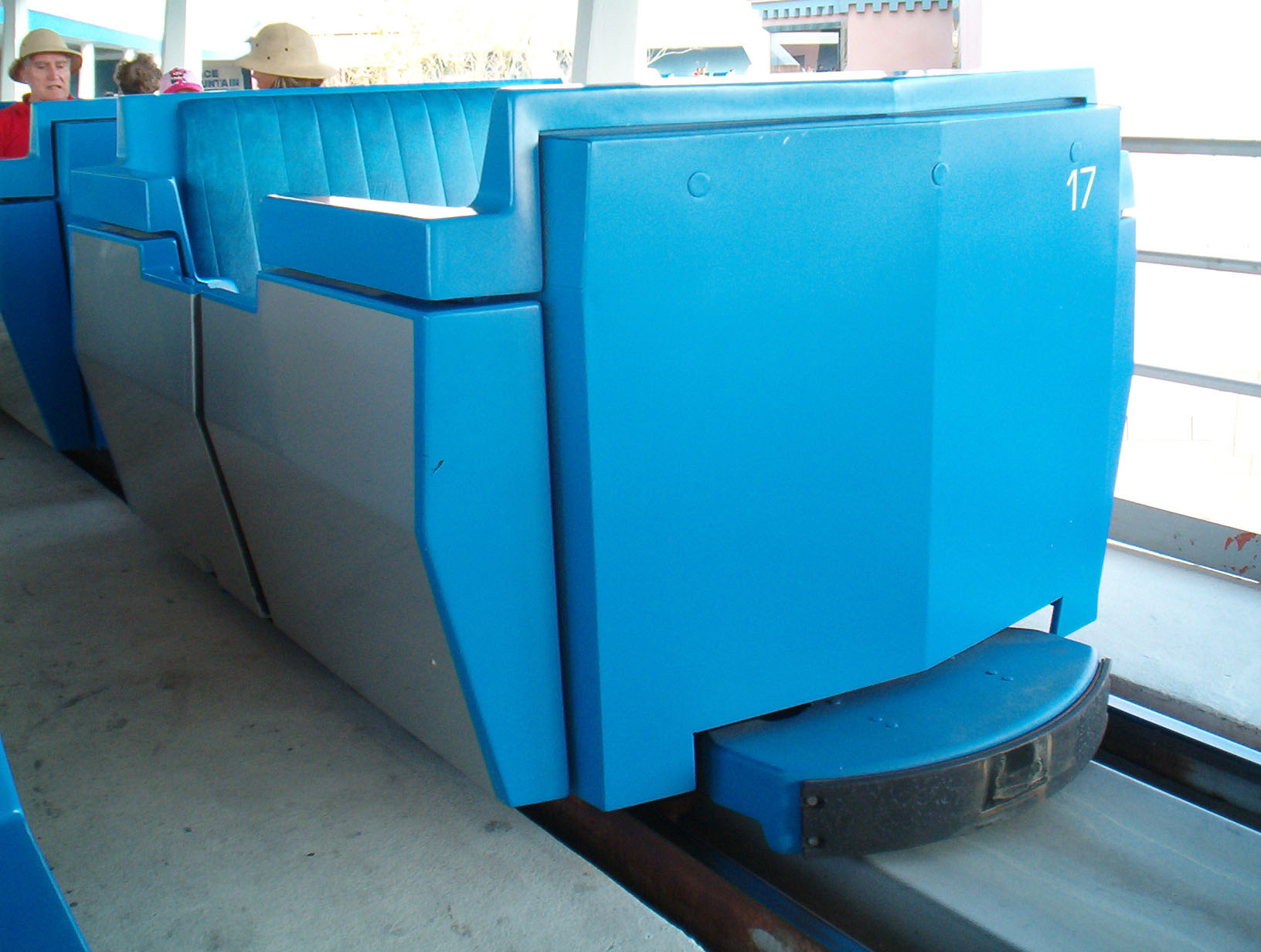
A TTA PeopleMover ride vehicle

The Wedway PeopleMover opened on July 1, 1975, based on the PeopleMover attraction at Disneyland in California (WED for Walter Elias Disney). The Edison Electric Institute was the original institutional patron of the attraction.

Unlike the Disneyland version, which used track-mounted rubber-tired wheels to propel the trains, the Magic Kingdom peoplemover uses linear induction motors to reduce maintenance costs and improve quiteness and smoothness. Instead of an open track with covered cars, as designed for Disneyland, the trains were designed were built as open-air cars that traveled under a permanent roof over the guideway. The engineering and design of the track itself were also reworked: while Disneyland's version regularly changed elevation, especially during the outdoor portions, the version for Walt Disney World was designed to remain at the same elevation from start to finish.

The original prototypes used linear synchronous motors from North American Rockwell, but the analog control system was unable to maintain synchronization between the vehicles and the motors as they transitioned between constant-speed zones and acceleration/deceleration zones, and the strong downward magnetic forces required the vehicles to be heavy and expensive. Instead, the final design uses a linear induction motor system designed by WED, which is less precise in controlling vehicle speed, but does not require synchronization and has minimal pull-down force.

The original narration was provided by longtime Disney announcer, Jack Wagner. In June 1985, his narration was replaced by the voice of ORAC One – "The Commuter Computer" voiced by actor Ronnie Schell, which was used until June 11, 1994, when the attraction received a makeover for the New Tomorrowland. At that time the WEDWay Peoplemover passed through the attractions that occupied Tomorrowland during that time, including Mission to Mars, If You Had Wings, and others. Originally, the tunnel through the south show building (now home to Buzz Lightyear's Space Ranger Spin) had three windows; one and two on the trains' right, three to the trains' left. This building first housed If You Had Wings, and the windows were carefully placed to look down into the Mexico, Jamaica, and Trinidad show scenes in such a way as to hide all projectors, lights and other show support equipment. When If You Had Wings (renamed If You Could Fly) was closed in January 1989 and remodeled into Delta Dreamflight, the windows no longer lined up correctly with show scenes. The first window was replaced with backlit panels depicting the ride's barnstormer scene. Window two looked into the Parisian Excursion scene, from a viewpoint which heavily distorted the tableau's forced perspective. The third window would have had riders looking directly into an extremely bright light and so was completely obscured with plywood and black fabric.

=== Tomorrowland Transit Authority (1994–2009) ===
In the spring of 1994, Tomorrowland underwent a massive refurbishment that changed the theme of the land from being a showcase of future technology to a working city of the future. The WEDway PeopleMover received new physical theming as the track structures along the north and south show buildings as well as Rocket Tower Plaza were updated from smooth Googie-esque white forms to boldly colored metallic structures. The sections of track linking the north show building to Space Mountain and Space Mountain to the Carousel of Progress were not changed.

It was during this refurbishment that the attraction's name changed from the Wedway PeopleMover to Tomorrowland Transit Authority. A new narration was added, with the tour led by Pete Renaday broadcasting from TTA Central. The new name and narration debuted on June 12, 1994. This 1994 recording remained largely unaltered until October 2, 2009, which came shortly after the ride had reopened following a five-month down period during the refurbishment of Space Mountain.

The TTA's backstory in the 1994–2009 version of the ride made reference to the Transit Authority's three different "lines": the Blue Line, the Red Line, and the Green Line. The Blue Line, which constitutes the actual ride, was Tomorrowland's intra-city elevated train system. The Red Line took riders 'off-planet' to other destinations in the galaxy, while the Green Line provided local transportation to Tomorrowland's "Hover-Burbs." There was a diorama of a hub station where all three lines intersect located on the second floor of the north show building (Interplanetary Convention Center). Other services provided by the Transit Authority (interstate highway maintenance and long-distance space travel) were alluded to in the ride's narration.

Changes made in the 1994 narration over its 15 years of use included the following:

- The replacement of the narration for the south show building in 1996 when Delta Dreamflight became Take Flight. This narration was replaced again when Take Flight was turned into Buzz Lightyear's Space Ranger Spin in 1998.
- The 1994 narration for Space Mountain said, "Now arriving in Space Mountain, Tomorrowland's gateway to the Galaxy, Presented by Federal Express," noting Space Mountain's sponsorship by FedEx. When FedEx dropped sponsorship in 2004, the narration was altered to cut off after "Galaxy."
- A narration was played upon leaving the south show building tunnel mentioning The Timekeeper from 1994 to 2006 when The Timekeeper closed, wherein the narration on the TTA mentioning it was removed.

=== Tomorrowland Transit Authority PeopleMover (2009–present) ===
The Tomorrowland Transit Authority closed on April 19, 2009, in line with a major refurbishment of Space Mountain, and reopened on September 12, 2009. The closure was necessary due to extensive construction work planned for the roller coaster, and the inherent safety risks such activity would pose to Transit Authority riders.

During the refurbishment, the beamway was enhanced with new multicolored LED lighting that moves in time with the music being played in Tomorrowland. Other enhancements included freshly re-painted trackway and infrastructure, as well as new speakers for the ride audio system.

On October 2, 2009, the ride received a new narration featuring the voice of Mike Brassell, with safety spiels provided by B. J. Ward, who provided the main narration for Disneyland's PeopleMover from 1982 to 1995. The new narration is similar to the original WEDway Peoplemover narration and includes segments introducing all attractions in Tomorrowland, including attractions that had opened after the last update to the narration, such as Buzz Lightyear's Space Ranger Spin and the Monsters, Inc. Laugh Floor. The narration also includes brief audio clips from characters represented by the various attractions: Buzz Lightyear can be heard when passing Buzz Lightyear's Space Ranger Spin, Roz is heard when passing Monsters, Inc. Laugh Floor, Mickey Mouse can be heard when passing above the Mickey's Star Traders store before the rebranding to Star Traders in 2019, and Stitch, also known as "Experiment 626", was previously heard when passing Stitch's Great Escape!. In addition, a female voice paging for Mr. Tom Morrow can be heard shortly after traveling past the lift hill in Space Mountain, which in the 1994 narration happened over Carousel of Progress. The PeopleMover name was revived in the new narration, which refers to the attraction vehicle as the "Tomorrowland Transit Authority PeopleMover," in place of the previous "TTA Metroliner" name introduced after the attraction's 1994 refurbishment.

On August 5, 2010, it was announced that the name "PeopleMover" would officially be re-instated into the ride's name, effectively changing it to Tomorrowland Transit Authority PeopleMover. Ride signage was changed around the track to reflect the name change.

On March 12, 2020, it was announced that Tomorrowland Transit Authority PeopleMover would close for refurbishment.

On October 26, 2020, since Walt Disney World reopened after being temporarily closed during the ongoing COVID-19 pandemic, Walt Disney World announced that they once again extended the Tomorrowland PeopleMover refurbishment. The refurbishment continues to follow along with the theme park hours posted the furthest into the future, in this case April 4, 2021. On March 31, 2021, Walt Disney World announced yet another extension to the PeopleMover refurbishment, this time set to reopen May 2021. The ride soft-opened on April 25, 2021, and officially reopened the next day.

On July 1, 2022, the narration was updated to feature an entirely new narration by ORAC-5 (a reference to the original narrator character of ORAC One), replacing the narration done by Mike Brassell. The safety spiel was also updated to make references to aliens and other sci-fi tropes. While much of the dialogue is still the same, just with a new voice, the narration now features references to past iterations of the PeopleMover's narration, as well as references to defunct rides and attractions from Tomorrowland's history, such as If You Had Wings, The Timekeeper, and the song "The Best Time of Your Life" from the 1975 version of The Carousel of Progress. The three-note musical chime heard throughout the 1994-2009 narration has also been restored. There is also narration referencing the new Tron Lightcycle Run. References to Stitch have been removed, as has the cameo by Monster Inc.'s Roz, with only Buzz Lightyear's cameo remaining. On July 6, 2026, it was announced that the narration for PeopleMover had been changed due to this closure.

== See also ==
- Magic Kingdom attraction and entertainment history
- Omnimover
- Rail transport in Walt Disney Parks and Resorts
- Subway (George Bush Intercontinental Airport)
