= Subway (George Bush Intercontinental Airport) =

Underground people mover

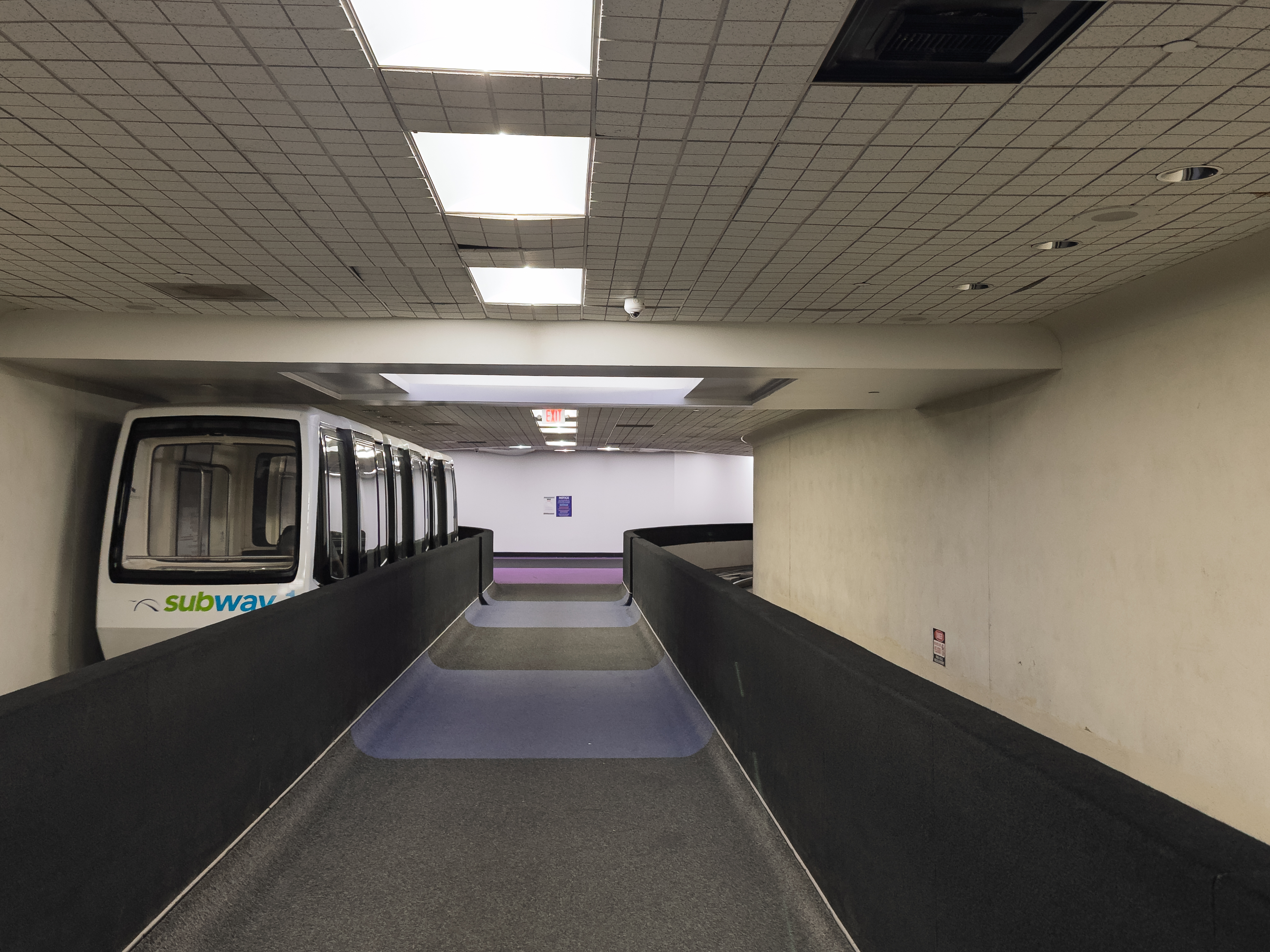
- The Subway at the George Bush Intercontinental Airport in Houston, Texas.

Overview
- Status: Operational
- Owner: Houston Airport System
- Locale: George Bush Intercontinental Airport, Houston, Texas
- Termini: Terminal A (west); Terminal D / E (east)
- Stations: 8 (in 5 locations)

Service
- Type: People mover
- Operator(s): JBT AeroTech
- Rolling stock: WEDway
- Daily ridership: 13,000

History
- Opened: 1969, rebuilt 1981

Technical
- Track length: approx. 2 miles (3.2 km)
- Number of tracks: 1 (in circular route)
- Character: Underground
- Electrification: None (passive trains)
- Operating speed: 15 miles per hour (24 km/h)

The Subway (formerly known as the inter-terminal train) is the older of the two separate inter-terminal people movers operating at George Bush Intercontinental Airport (IAH) in Houston, Texas.

== Description ==
Opened in 1969 along with the airport, the train system was replaced in 1981 with the current WEDway system, built by WED Transportation Systems, a division of what is now known as Walt Disney Imagineering. The Subway serves approximately 240,000 passengers per month, for a yearly ridership averaging 2.9 million. It is built underground and serves landside traffic, unlike the newer Skyway, which is elevated and operates airside.

The Subway is notable as the only WEDway people mover built by the Walt Disney Company outside of a Disney property. It uses much of the mechanical technology used by the PeopleMover, an attraction in the Magic Kingdom's Tomorrowland. The design permits the trains to make tight corners that are necessary along portions of the basement route. Like their Disney counterparts, the trains are completely unpowered, relying on linear induction motors in the track for propulsion. Platform screen doors at each station have a special mechanism unlocking the trains' doors, and on-train station announcements and audible warning messages are provided by a trackside public address system through openings in the tops of the vehicle car-bodies.

Eight three-car trains are used on the system, of which six operate at any single time with three-minute headways at speeds of up to 15 miles per hour (24 km/h). They stop at eight stations in a circuit serving every terminal and the Houston Airport Hotel, for a round-trip time of 18 minutes. The system is currently maintained and operated by JBT Aerotech.

=== Future ===
Houston Airport System, the owner of the airport, is conducting preliminary studies of potential new systems to replace the Subway, as both it and major airlines serving the airport have determined that the cost of operating and maintaining the system is no longer viable.

== See also ==
- List of airport people mover systems
