= Spaceship Earth (Epcot) =

Dark ride at Epcot

- The pavilion logo, a throwback to the original logo, introduced in 2019 for EPCOT signage The attraction wordmark used since 2007

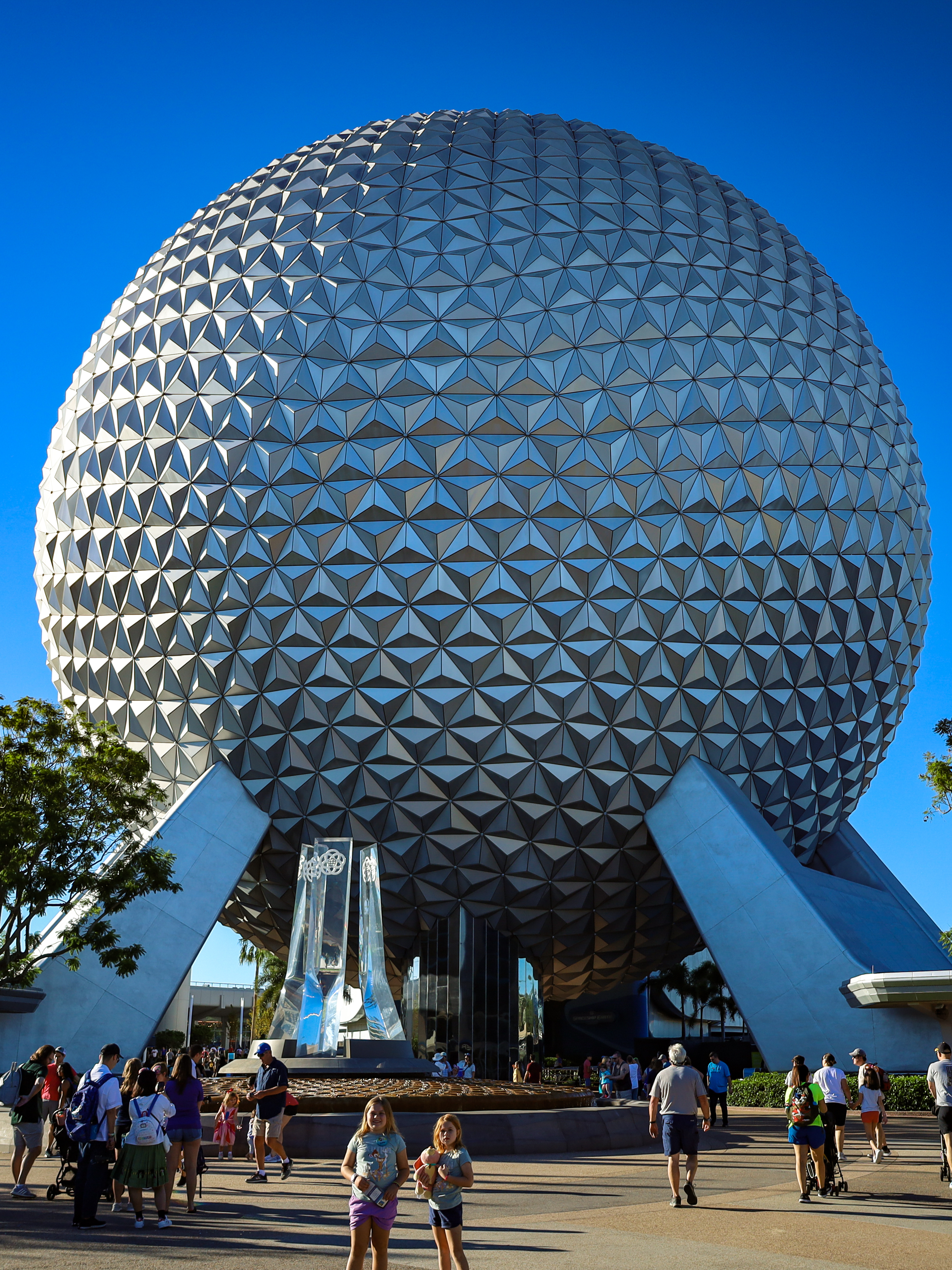
- Spaceship Earth in 2022

EPCOT
- Area: Future World (1982–2021); World Celebration (2021–present)
- Coordinates: 28°22′31″N 81°32′58″W
- Status: Operating
- Opening date: October 1, 1982

Ride statistics
- Attraction type: Dark ride
- Manufacturer: Walt Disney Imagineering
- Designer: Walt Disney Imagineering
- Music: Ron Ovadia and Peter Stougaard (1986-1994); Edo Guidotti (1994–2007); Bruce Broughton (2007–present)
- Site area: 109,375 sq ft (10,161.3 m^{2})
- Vehicle type: Omnimover
- Riders per vehicle: 4
- Rows: 2
- Riders per row: 2
- Duration: 15:00
- Host: Vic Perrin (1982–1986); Walter Cronkite (1986–1994); Jeremy Irons (1994–2007); Judi Dench (2007–present)
- Diameter: 165 ft (50 m)
- Height: 180 ft (55 m)
- Circumference: 518.1 ft (157.9 m)
- Volume: 2,350,000 cu ft (67,000 m^{3})
- Weight: 15,520,000 lb (7,040,000 kg)
- Number of tiles: 11,520
- Sponsors: Bell System (1982–1984); AT&T (1984–2004); Siemens (2005–2017)
- Lightning Lane available
- Must transfer from wheelchair
- Assistive listening available

Spaceship Earth is a dark ride attraction at the EPCOT theme park at Walt Disney World in Bay Lake, Florida. The geodesic sphere in which the attraction is housed has served as the symbolic structure of EPCOT since the park opened in 1982.

The 15-minute ride takes guests on a time machine-themed experience, demonstrating how advancements in human communication have helped to create the future one step at a time. Riding in Omnimover-type vehicles along a track that spirals up and down the geodesic sphere, passengers are taken through scenes depicting important breakthroughs in communication throughout history—from the development of early language through cave paintings, to the use of hieroglyphs, to the invention of the alphabet, to the creation of the printing press, to today's modern communication advancements, including telecommunication, mass communication, and the internet.

An opening day attraction, the ride has been updated three times—in 1986, 1994, and 2007, when the attraction became part of Spaceship Earth Pavilion. A fourth update of the attraction was planned for the early 2020s but was indefinitely delayed due to the COVID-19 pandemic.

== Structure ==
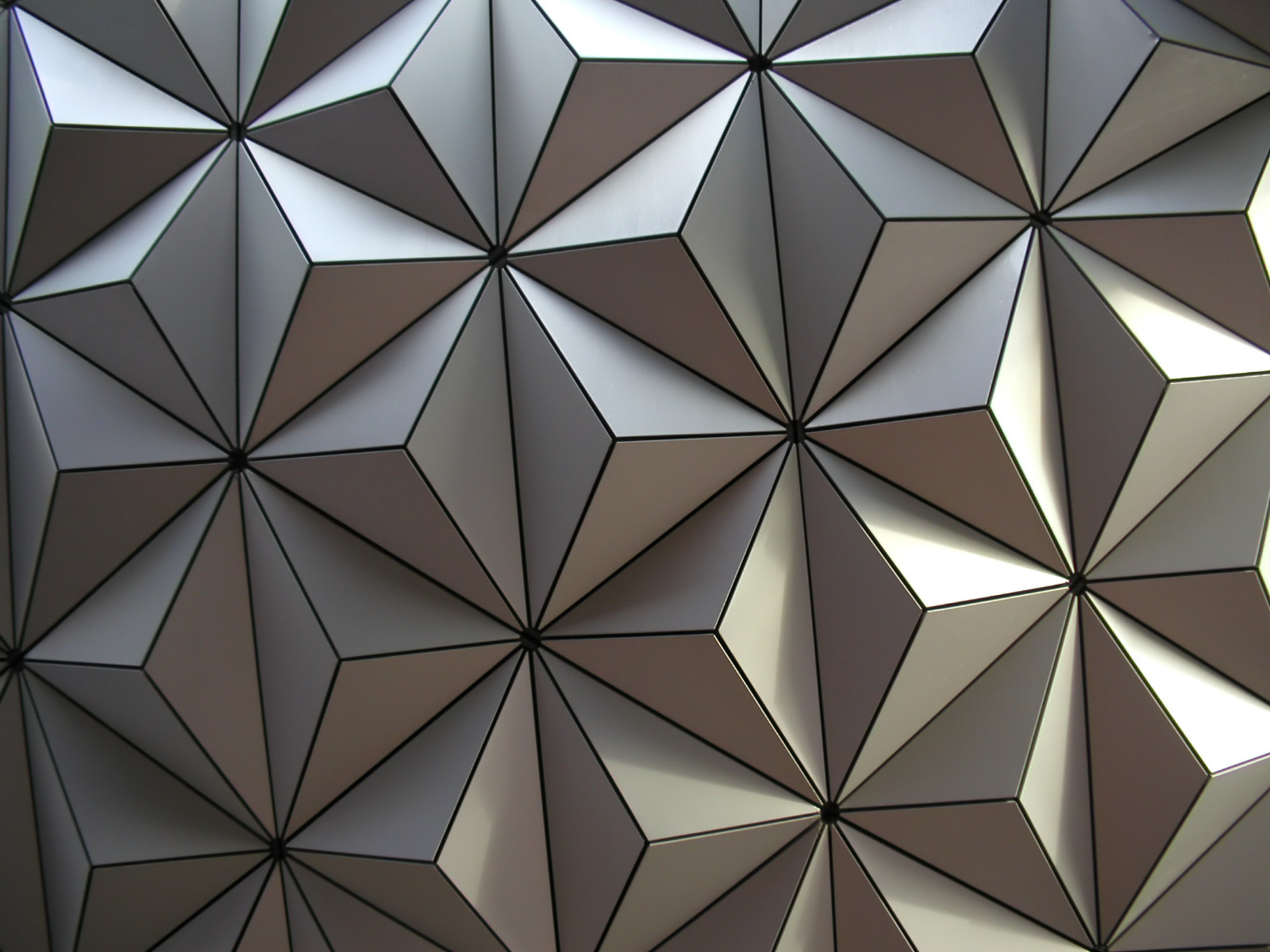
Close-up of Spaceship Earth's Alucobond tiles prior to the installation of the "Beacon of Magic" LED lights in the circular gaps

The structure is similar in texture to the United States pavilion from Expo 67 in Montreal but, unlike that structure, Spaceship Earth is a complete sphere, supported by three pairs of legs. The architectural design was conceived by Wallace Floyd Design Group. The structural designs of both Expo 67 and Spaceship Earth were completed by Simpson Gumpertz & Heger Inc. of Boston, Massachusetts.

Geometrically, Spaceship Earth is derived from the Class 2 geodesic polyhedron with frequency of division equal to 8. Each face of the polyhedron is divided into three isosceles triangles to form each point. In theory, there are 11,520 total isosceles triangles forming 3840 points. In reality, some of those triangles are partially or fully nonexistent due to supports and doors; there are actually only 11,324 silvered facets, with 954 partial or full flat triangular panels.

The appearance of being a monolithic sphere is an architectural goal that was achieved through a structural trick. Spaceship Earth is in fact two structural domes. Six legs are supported on pile groups that are driven up to 160 feet (49 m) into Central Florida's soft earth. Those legs support a steel box-shaped ring at the sphere's perimeter, at about 30 degrees south latitude in earth-terms. The upper structural dome sits on this ring. A grid of trusses inside the ring supports two helical structures of the ride and show system. Below the ring, a second dome is hung from the bottom, completing the spherical shape. The ring and trusses form a table-like structure which separates the upper dome from the lower. Supported by and about three feet off the structural domes is a cladding sphere to which the shiny Alucobond panels and drainage system are mounted.

The cladding was designed so that when it rains, no water pours off the sides onto the ground. All water is collected through one-inch gaps in the facets into a gutter system, and the water is channeled into the World Showcase Lagoon.

== History ==
=== Design and construction ===
The structure was designed with the help of science fiction writer Ray Bradbury, who also helped write the original storyline for the attraction. The term "Spaceship Earth" was popularised by Buckminster Fuller, who also popularized the geodesic dome.

Construction took 26 months. Extending upwards from the table are "quadropod" structures, which support smaller beams which form the shell of the steel skeleton. Pipes stand the aluminum skin panels away from the skeleton and provide space for utilities. A small service car is parked in the interstitial space between the structural and cladding surfaces, and it can carry a prone technician down the sides to access repair locations. The shop fabrication of the steel (done in nearby Tampa, Florida) was an early instance of computer-aided drafting and materials processing.

Spaceship Earth was originally sponsored by the Bell System from 1982 until 1984, when it was broken into smaller companies and its parent company, AT&T, became an independent company. AT&T sponsored Spaceship Earth from 1984 until 2004. From 2005 until 2017, the German company Siemens was the sponsor of Spaceship Earth. As of 2025, the ride currently has no sponsor. The private sponsor lounge, located on the second floor above Project Tomorrow, was repurposed into an adult only lounge called GEO-82, which opened June 4, 2025. Its name is based on the type of structure and the year EPCOT opened.

During Epcot Center's opening ceremony William Ellinghaus, then president of AT&T, dedicated Spaceship Earth and stated: "Now as you will soon see, Spaceship Earth’s theme is communications, civilization and communications from Stone Age to Information Age, and I therefore think it is very fitting that we dedicate Spaceship Earth to all of the people who have advanced communications, arts, and sciences, and in so doing have demonstrated that communications is truly the beginning of understanding."

=== Updates and history ===
The opening day version of the attraction featured narration by actor Vic Perrin. This version featured a network operations center with a data map of the United States in the modern telecommunications section. The top of the sphere featured a large lighted space station with two astronauts working on satellites and a woman sitting in the station operating controls. During the final descent, vehicles passed several monitors showing various events and activities. This version of the ride closed on May 25, 1986.

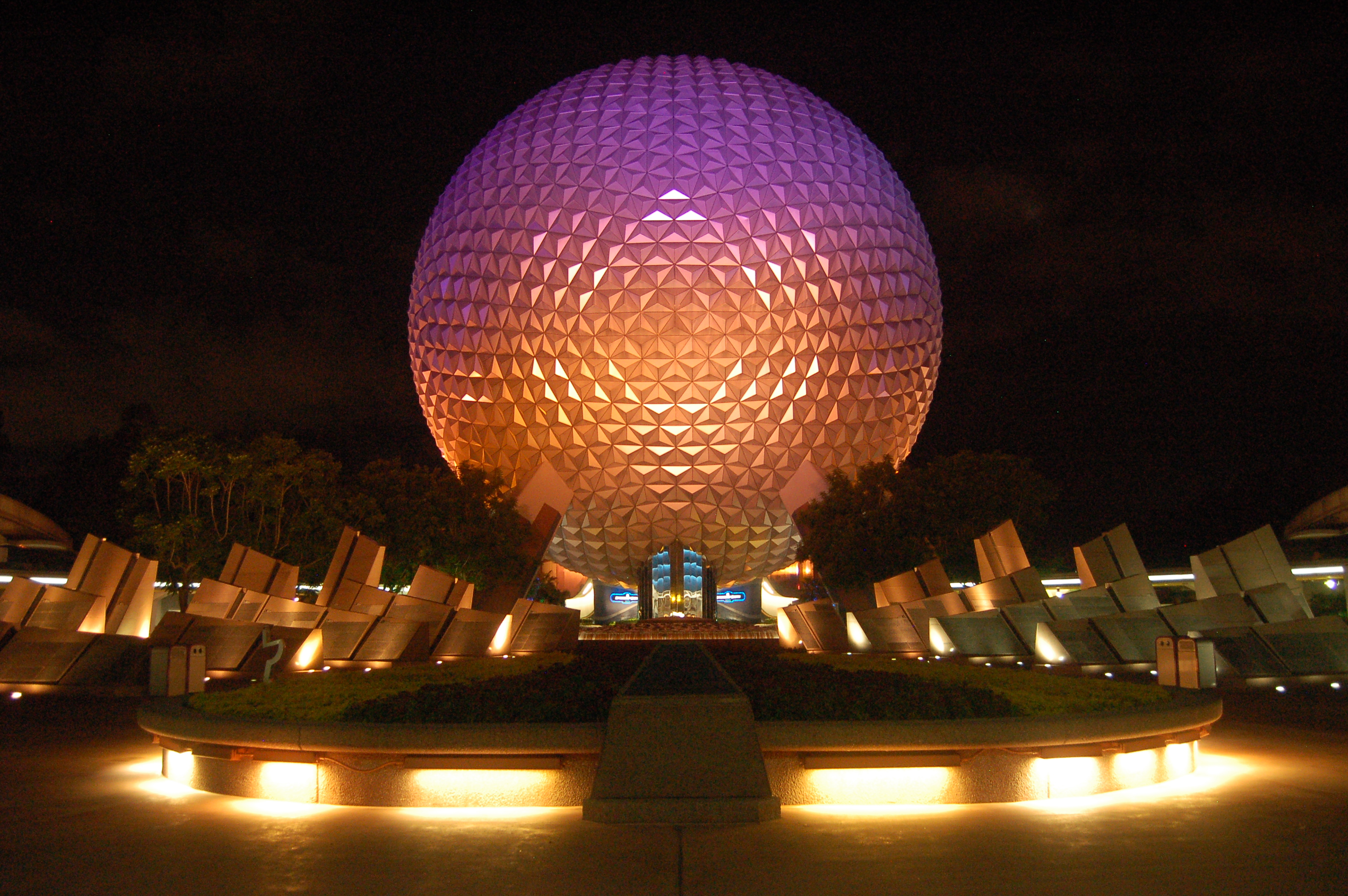
Night view of Spaceship Earth in 2010

Debuting May 29, 1986, the second version of the attraction featured a new narration by news journalist Walter Cronkite, reading from an updated script. This version started off with the tunnel at the beginning of the ride enhanced by twinkling lights. Two new scenes were added before the network operations center, on the left side of the track, featuring a woman working in a “paperless office” and a boy at a computer in his bedroom. A new theme song, "Tomorrow's Child", was added to the ending descent, which was redesigned with projected images of children on screens to fit the theme. This version of the attraction closed on August 15, 1994.

The attraction's third version debuted on November 23, 1994, and featured an updated script narrated by Jeremy Irons and a new orchestral soundtrack, based upon Bach's Sinfonia No. 2 in C Minor for the entire attraction. This version maintained most of the scenes in the first half of the attraction as they were, but removed three scenes towards the end: the boy's bedroom, the paperless office and the network operations center. These scenes were replaced with a single new scene depicting a boy and girl using the Internet to video call between America and Japan. The climax was redone, with the updating of the projected Earth and the removal of the space station and astronauts (the astronauts subsequently turned up in Space Mountain's post-show, where they were used until 2009). The descent was also completely overhauled featuring new scenes depicting communication of the future utilizing Pepper's ghost figures, a fiber optic model of the "City of the Future" and the removal of the "Tomorrow's Child" theme song. This version of the attraction closed on July 9, 2007.

The attraction's fourth and current version debuted with soft openings on December 8, 2007, and officially opened on February 15, 2008, when the ride was re-dedicated. This version features a new narration by Judi Dench reading from a new script, a new musical score by Bruce Broughton and new costumes, lighting, projections, props and audio-animatronic figures. Revised scenes include the former Greek play becoming a mathematics lesson as well as the replacement of the boy and girl's video call with new scenes depicting the creation of mainframe computers and the personal computer. Interactive touch screens were installed in the ride vehicles where riders can choose their vision of the future. This resembles a similar idea to the now-defunct Horizons attraction. At the beginning of the ride, a camera takes riders' pictures (using facial recognition technology) which are then used in an interactive cartoon played during the ride's descent with narration by Cam Clarke (the descent's show scenes were completely removed for this version). Visitors are now also asked where they live; this is used in the post-show area where a map of the world is displayed with the riders' faces.

On June 30, 2017, Siemens, a long-time sponsor, announced they would end their sponsorship of the attraction, as well as the firework show, IllumiNations: Reflections of Earth. The last official day of Siemens sponsorship was on October 10, 2017.

=== Wand ===
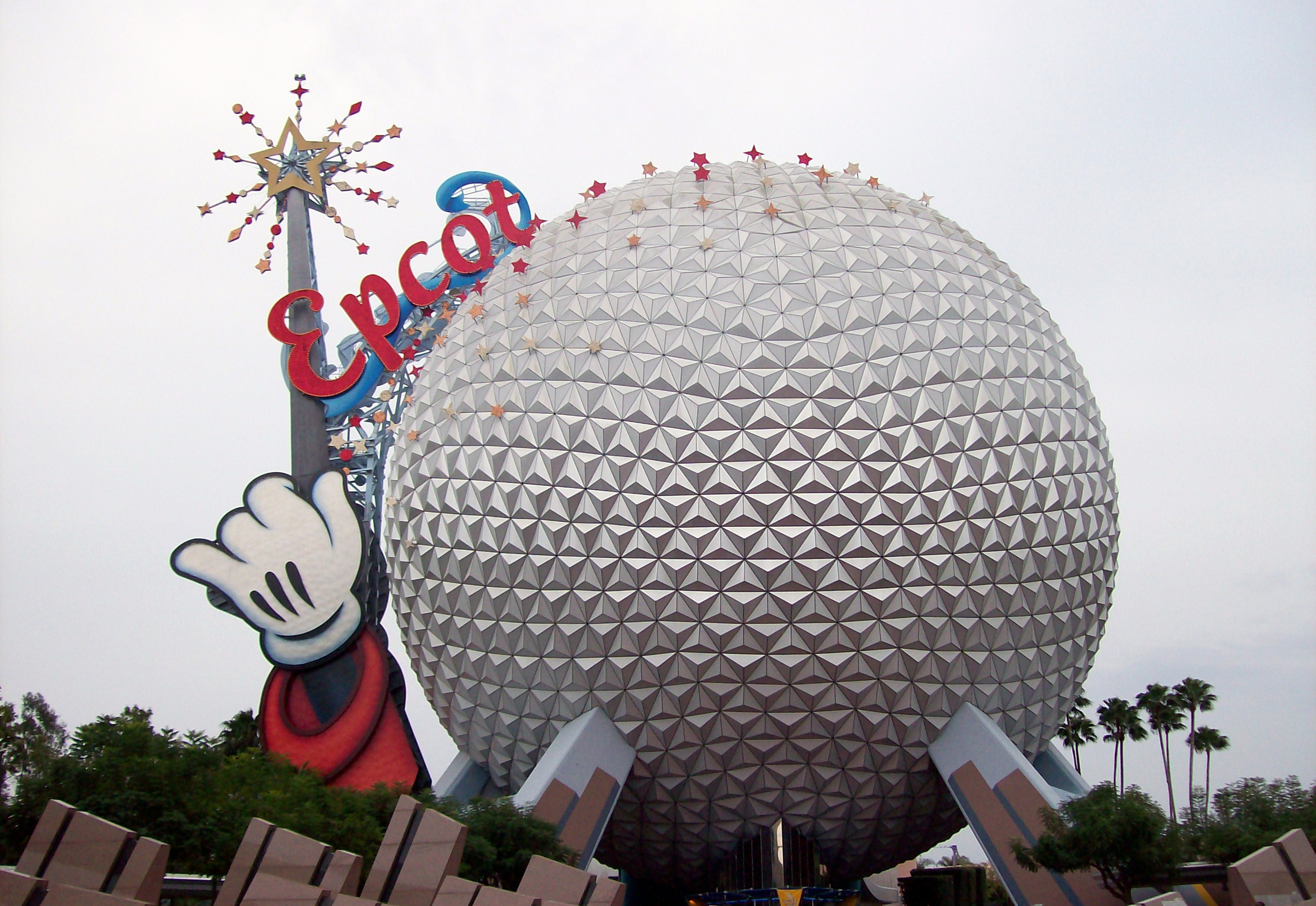
Spaceship Earth with the Mickey Mouse wand, added in 1999 and removed in 2007

In celebration of the year 2000, a 25-story "magic wand" held by a representation of Mickey Mouse's hand was built next to the sphere. Inspiration for it came from the Sorcerer's Apprentice sequence of Fantasia (although Mickey did not actually use a magic wand in that sequence). At the top of the structure was a large cut-out of the number 2000. This structure was constructed to have a lifetime of about 10 years, and it was left standing after the Millennium Celebration ended. In 2001, the number 2000 was replaced with the word "Epcot" in a script font that differed from the park's logotype.

On July 5, 2007, Epcot Vice President Jim MacPhee announced that Spaceship Earth would be restored to its original appearance, and that the "magic wand" structure would be removed in time for the park's 25th anniversary on October 1, 2007. It was rumored that Siemens AG, the new sponsor of Spaceship Earth, requested the wand be removed as it did not fit their corporate image. The attraction was closed on July 9, 2007, and by October 1 the wand structure, the stars and their supports were gone, replaced by palm trees and other plants. Components of the structure were later auctioned on eBay.

=== Postponed 2020s update ===
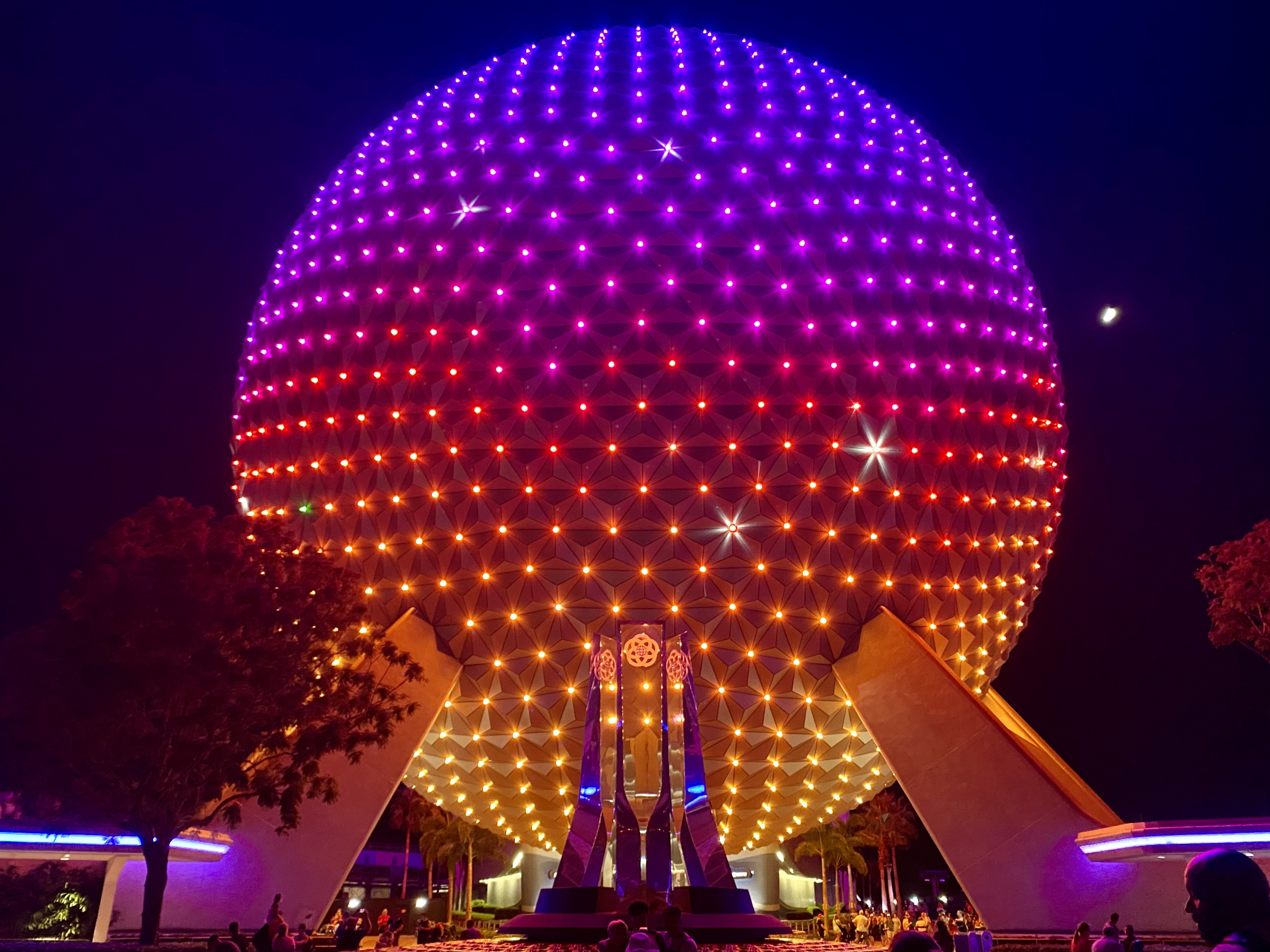
Spaceship Earth's LED lighting design introduced in 2021

On August 25, 2019, it was announced that, as part of a multi-year renovation of Epcot, Spaceship Earth would be updated with a new narrative about the human experience and the art of storytelling under the new name Spaceship Earth: Our Shared Story. An ethereal "story light" would guide guests as they traveled through the attraction. The attraction was initially scheduled to close for this update on May 26, 2020, however this was indefinitely delayed due to the temporary closure of all Walt Disney World parks on March 16 due to the COVID-19 pandemic.

When Epcot officially reopened in July 2020, Disney confirmed that Spaceship Earth's new update had been indefinitely postponed. A spokesperson for Disney said, "As with most businesses during this period, we are further evaluating long-term project plans. The decision was made to postpone development of the 'Mary Poppins'-inspired attraction and Spaceship Earth at this time." However, in 2022, the concept art for the attraction were leaked on reportedly shows the new and reimagined scenes from the attraction.

At D23 2024 on August 10, 2024, it was announced that a new lounge called Geo–82 and Geo–82 Fireworks Experience, would take the place of the former Siemens lounge attached to Spaceship Earth. The lounge opened on June 4, 2025, with reservations opening on May 6, 2025, and is reserved for adults only.

At D23 2026, it was revealed that Spaceship Earth would get an update, which is rather than using the Our Shared Story subtitle, though no official timeline was announced. Disney Imagineering executive Ali Rubenstein stated at the event "Today, Spaceship Earth focuses on the story of human communication. We’re broadening that… our new version of Spaceship Earth will be about human connection...Spaceship Earth will remain classically EPCOT—a journey through time celebrating the progress made possible through human connection."

== Ride experience ==
Unlike an omnimover system, where events are triggered, on Spaceship Earth a narration plays as the show scenes and music run on loop. The script, originally penned by Ray Bradbury, has since been updated to meet contemporary technological trends. The current narrator is Judi Dench, who is accompanied by an orchestral score by Bruce Broughton.

This attraction showcased the first use of the "smellitzer" scent distribution system. It was created by Imagineer Robert 'Bob' McCarthy in 1981 to emulate the faux scent of smoke in the city of Rome scene. The smellitzer was named after the Howitzer cannon as it shoots out puffs of smells. It was patented in 1984 as a Scent-Emitting System and is US patent #US4603030A. This technology was also used on Universe of Energy to create the smell of a volcano and a swamp.

=== Show scenes ===
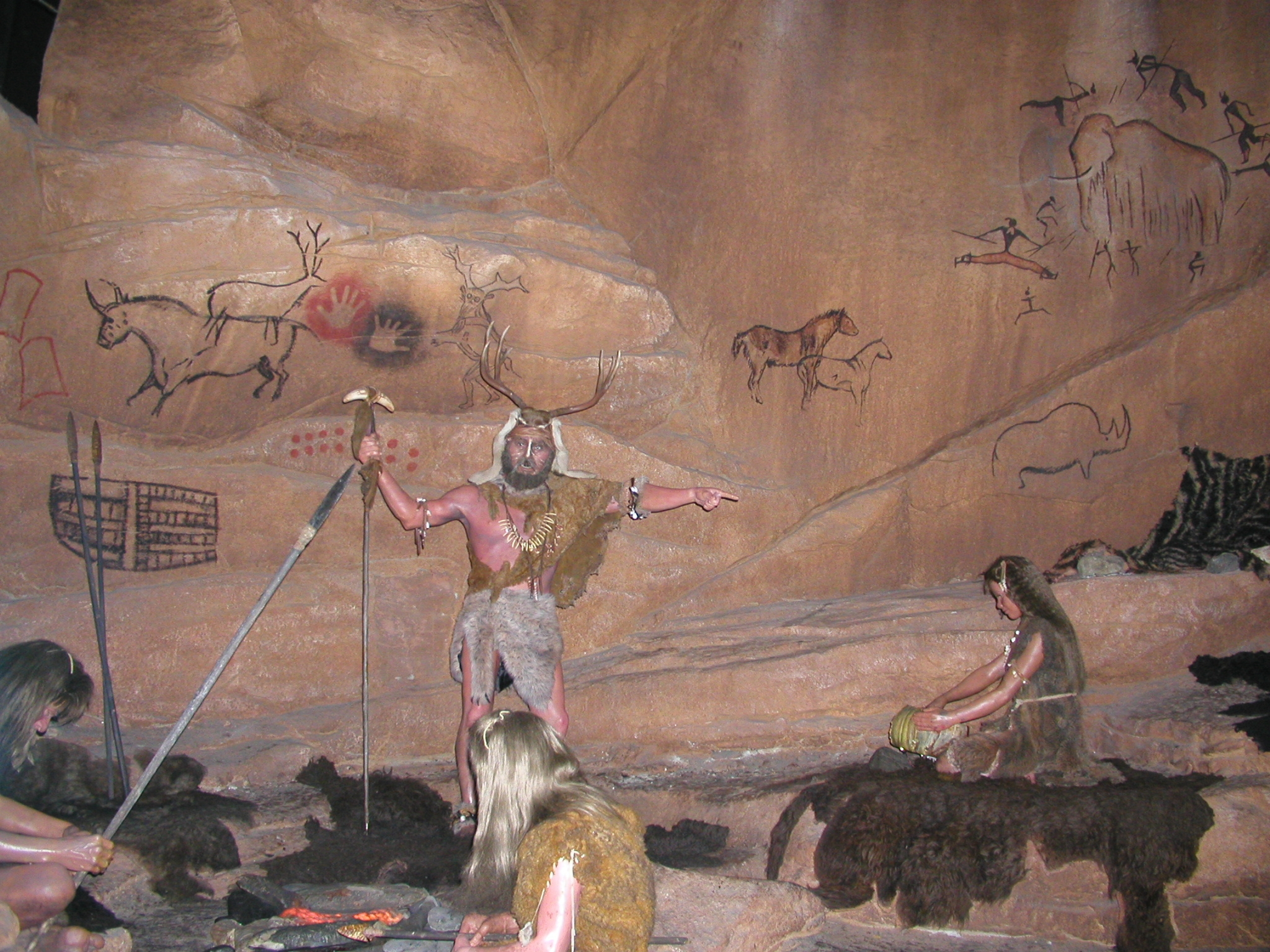
Audio-animatronic cavemen in the first scene of the ride, seen in 2005. The scene has since been updated with new figures and an animated background.

The ride begins with the time-machine vehicles ascending into a dark tunnel with twinkling stars all around. On touchscreens in the vehicle, guests select their language and hometown, and then have their picture taken by a passing camera for later use.

As the vehicle arrives at the first story of the structure, it begins a slow curve. A large film screen is stretched along the inside of the sphere, depicting early humans fighting for survival against a woolly mammoth, triggering development of early communication and language to help them work and survive together. As the screen dims behind them, guests enter a cavern populated by audio animatronic early humans, who represent the development of early writing through cave paintings. The drawings on the walls come to life and begin to dance as the car continues onward.

The next scene depicts Egyptians, who invented a system of portable communication using hieroglyphs recorded on papyrus, as opposed to cave paintings that were unable to be transported as humans migrated.

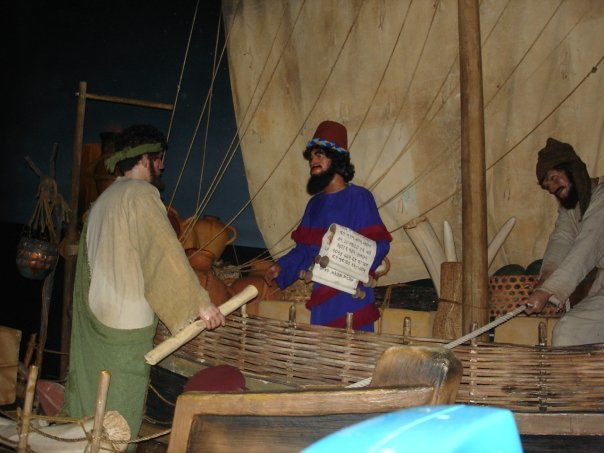
The Phoenicians animatronics in an early scene from the ride discussing how our modern alphabet evolved

Phoenician merchants are seen carrying goods to faraway lands. The narration explains how each civilization is trying to communicate, but cannot understand each other due to language barriers. But the Phoenicians, who trade with all of them, create a simple common alphabet, so that trade and communication becomes easier. Turning a corner, riders see a lesson in mathematics being taught in a piazza in an ancient Greek city, in a sequence that attempts to show how math helped invent the 'birth of a high tech life we enjoy today.' Shifting to ancient Rome, a night scene including a traveler in a chariot delivering news depicts how language is portrayed as a tool for cultural unification with the vast network of roads that stretched across Europe, ultimately all leading to Rome.

Suddenly, the scene takes a dark turn as crashes are heard and the smell of burning wood fills the air. The fall of Rome by invading mercenary armies also brought the destruction of the bulk of the world's recorded knowledge, including the loss of scrolls at the Library of Alexandria. But the narration gives hope as the vehicle reaches the next level, where Jewish and Islamic scholars of the Middle Ages are seen preserving recorded information, and continuing to progress in science.

Winding through exotic fabrics and drapery, guests arrive at a European monastery where biblical manuscripts are being copied by hand. Gutenberg is seen working the first movable-type printing press, allowing information to travel freely across the globe. The European Renaissance is portrayed, with scenes of musicians and artists sculpting a woman and painting a portrait of fruit. The scene ends as the car passes under a scaffold, where Michelangelo is seen painting the ceiling of the Sistine Chapel.

The time machines transition to the United States in a post-Civil War North. Guests witness news reports illuminating the planet of current events with efficiency. Loud, industrial-sized printing presses show the influence of the machine as an advancement in mass communication. Seen next is a romanticized version of the 20th century communications revolution—after passing telegraphs, radio, telephones, and movies, riders see the 1969 television broadcast of Apollo 11 landing on the Moon, featuring Walter Cronkite. Riders hear Neil Armstrong say his most famous quote, "That's one small step for man, one giant leap for mankind." while the vehicles pass by the TV.

Language had progressed to such an extent that it no longer was spoken solely by humans, but by machines as well. Guests turn a corner and find themselves in a large mainframe computer as they ascend up the final hill. Ascending to the top, guests pass through a 1970s garage in California, where an actual 1976 Chevrolet Vega GT sits next to a young man who is seen building one of the first home computers. The car then moves into the cupola of Spaceship Earth and each ride vehicle pivots 90 degrees clockwise. The top of the structure is, in fact, a planetarium studded with stars and a large projection of Earth. Before the vehicles start to move down the long descent to the unloading area, they rotate another 90 degrees clockwise and guests ride the end of the attraction backward, in a semi-reclining position.

The remainder of the ride moves through a tunnel of free-hanging LED string lights and mirrors to give the illusion of a seemingly infinite number of stars, and into a realm of glowing triangles. During this time, the guests are instructed to use the touchscreens in their vehicle to answer questions about preferences to create an animated depiction of their future, which uses the pictures taken at the beginning of the ride. (If fewer than two guests are riding, or the camera is disabled, generic faces are used.)

At the end of the descent, the omnimover vehicles rotate 180 degrees counterclockwise to face forward just before entering the offload station. Guests are then invited to visit the 'Project Tomorrow' post-show as they exit the ride cars.

=== Post-show ===
==== Earth Station ====
The original post show for Spaceship Earth was called Earth Station. It lasted from 1982 until 1994. It was a wide open exhibit space that included:

- Guest Relations
- Seven large rear projector screens mounted on the walls of the exhibit space toward the ceiling that displayed visual previews of various EPCOT Center attractions.
- WorldKey Information: Interactive kiosks that offered previews of various EPCOT Center attractions. Guests could also talk to a live cast member via two-way closed-circuit video, or make a restaurant reservation while in the park.

==== Global Neighborhood ====
When AT&T renewed their sponsorship in 1994, they redesigned the exhibit space for Earth Station into the Global Neighborhood. The original Global Neighborhood lasted from 1994 until 1999. In 1999, the exhibit space was updated to become the New Global Neighborhood for the Millennium Celebration. The exhibit space closed in 2004 after AT&T left as sponsor.

==== Project Tomorrow: Inventing the Wonders of the Future ====
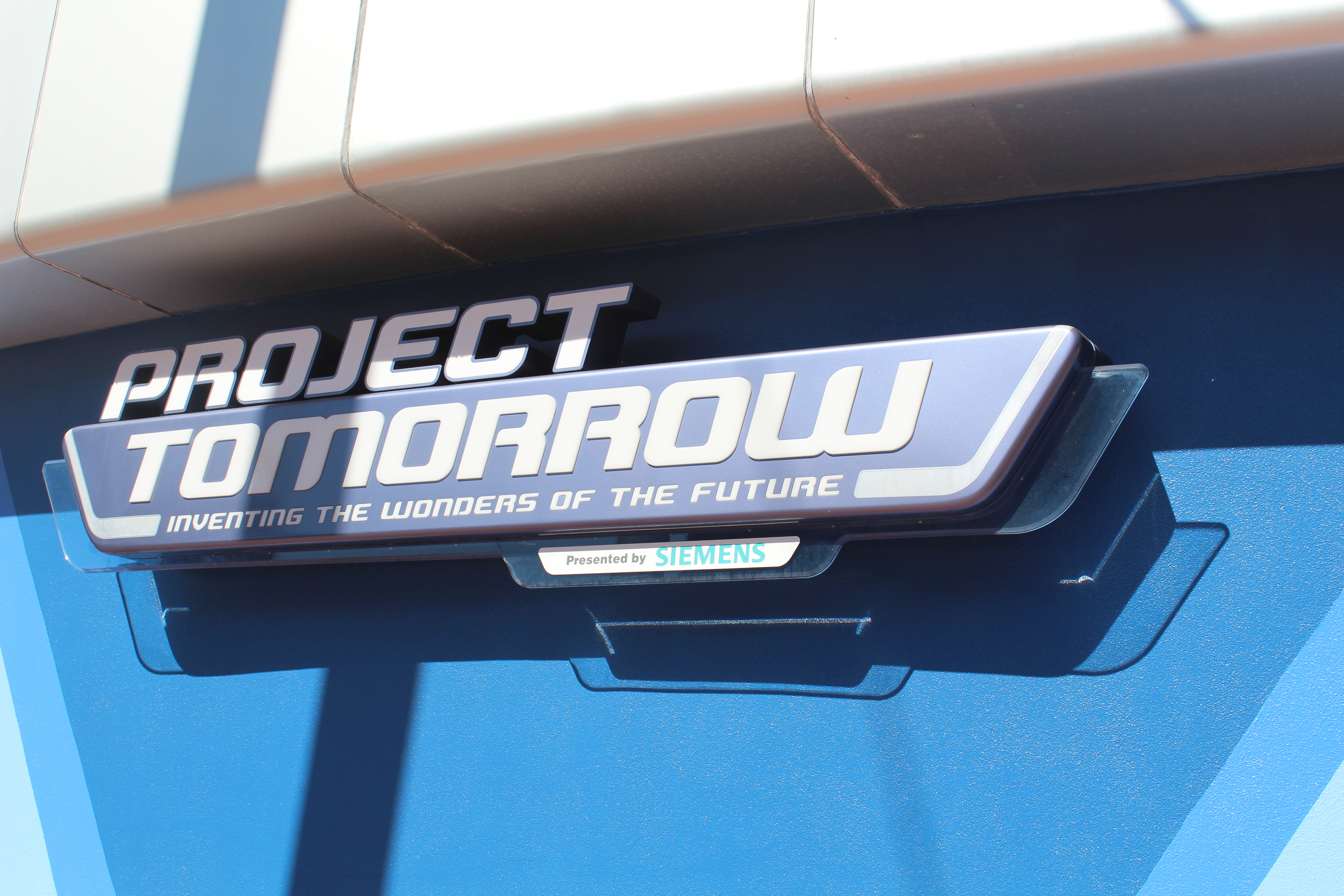
Project Tomorrow remains as the current post-show for Spaceship Earth, however it is no longer sponsored by Siemens.

AT&T's departure as sponsor in 2004 caused the exhibit to close. Siemens AG, the newest sponsor of Spaceship Earth, having signed on in 2005, created a new exhibit space called Project Tomorrow: Inventing the Wonders of the Future. The new exhibit space once again uses the entire exhibit space that only Earth Station had once used. The new exhibit space houses interactive exhibits featuring various Siemens AG technology. These interactive displays and games allow guests to see the future of medicine, transportation and energy management. The space opened with two games, with two new games added in December 2007 and January 2008. After Siemens dropped their sponsorships, all signs mentioning them were removed, however, the name stayed the same.

Project Tomorrow current attractions are:

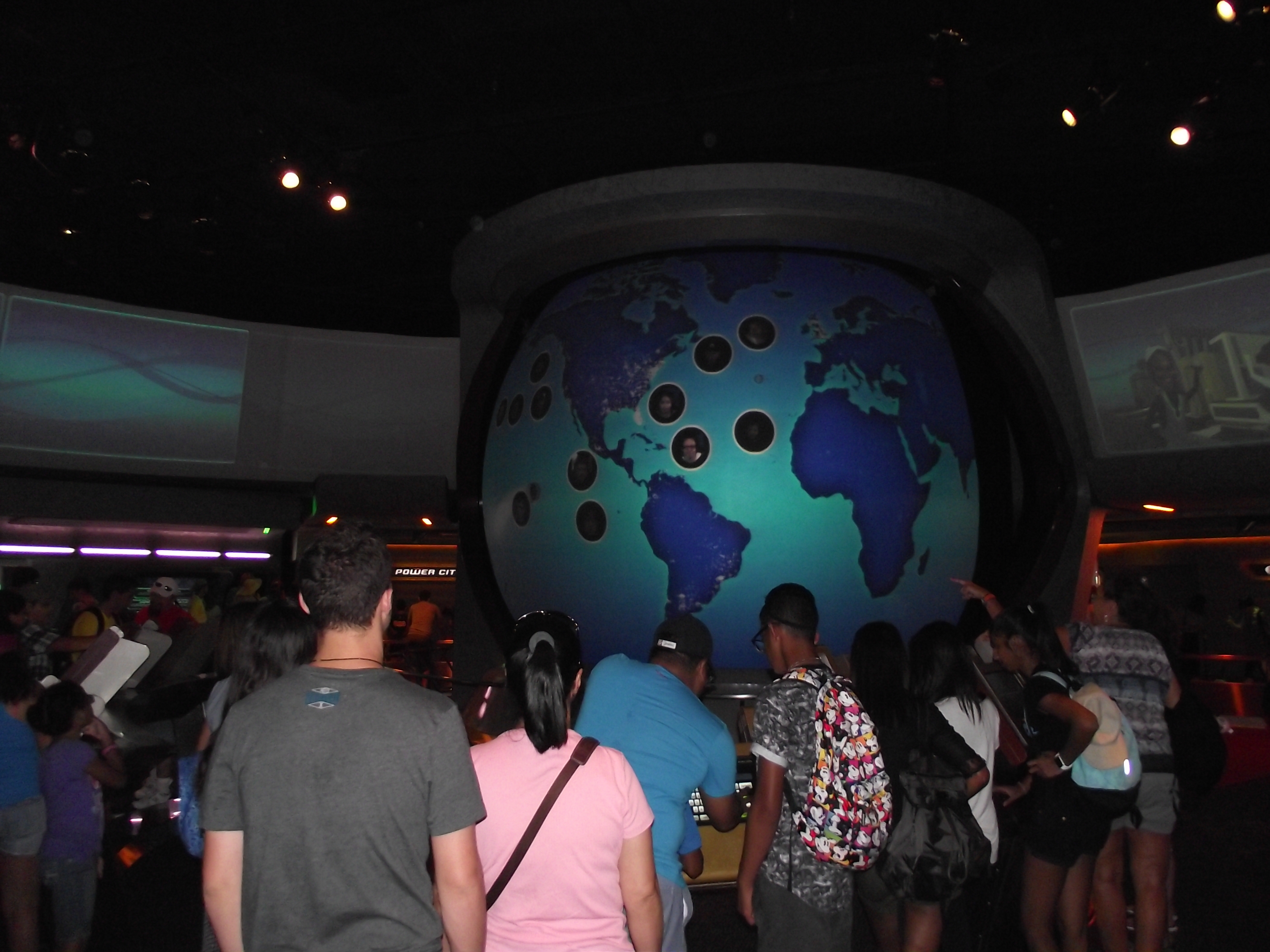
After riders record their hometowns on ride screens, their responses are projected on a large globe upon exiting.

- An illuminated globe that shows the hometown of all Spaceship Earth visitors for the day.
- Body Builder – a 3-D game that challenges guests to reconstruct a human body. Features the voice of Wallace Shawn as Dr. Bones.
- Super Driver – a driving simulation video game featuring vehicle accident and avoidance systems. It simulates what is supposed to be the future of driving. You drive a "smart-car" and try to stop the city from being destroyed.
- Power City – a large, digital "shuffleboard-style" game that has guest racing around the board to power their city.
- InnerVision – a coordination and reaction-time game with elements similar to Simon and Dance Dance Revolution

==== VIP Lounge ====
A VIP lounge, operated by the pavilion sponsor, exists above the post-show area of Spaceship Earth. Employees of the current sponsoring company and their guests can relax in the lounge while visiting Epcot. The sponsor can also hold receptions in the space as well as conduct workshops and business presentations. When Spaceship Earth was without sponsorship from 2004 to 2005, the room was utilized for private events such as weddings and conventions. The layout is small and curved in shape, with one wall consisting of large windows where visitors can look out onto the park.

When Siemens AG took over as sponsor, the lounge was given the name "Base21." In 2012, the name was dropped and it was then known as the "Siemens VIP Center" until Siemens' sponsorship contract ended in 2017.

== Timeline ==
Spaceship Earth's original pavilion logo

Spaceship Earth's second logo, visible at the entrance of the ride since 2007

- October 1, 1982: Spaceship Earth opens with the opening of EPCOT Center, sponsored by the Bell System. The narrator is Vic Perrin.
- 1984: Sponsor changes to AT&T after the breakup of the Bell System.
- May 26, 1986: Attraction reopens from first major renovation. New narration by Walter Cronkite. "Tomorrow's Child" song added to the finale.
- August 15, 1994: Closes for second major renovation. "Home computer", "Office Computer", "Network Operations Center", and "Space Station" scenes removed. New final scenes installed and replace old final scenes. Earth Station closes. "Tomorrow's Child" ending removed.
- November 23, 1994: Attraction reopens. New ride narration by Jeremy Irons. New ride score by Edo Guidotti. The Global Neighborhood replaces Earth Station.
- September 29, 1999: The Mickey Mouse arm holding a wand is dedicated with "2000" over Spaceship Earth.
- November 24, 1999: The Global Neighborhood is replaced with The New Global Neighborhood, a new exhibit space serving as a hands-on playground for Spaceship Earth's post show.
- May 2001: The Mickey Mouse arm holding a wand is changed to say "Epcot" over Spaceship Earth.
- January 1, 2004: AT&T Corporation sponsorship ends.
- April 2004: The New Global Neighborhood is removed, and the area is boarded up. AT&T references removed.
- November 2005: It is announced that Siemens AG will sponsor Spaceship Earth for twelve years.
- April 11, 2007: Major changes coming to Spaceship Earth are announced.
- April 25, 2007: The new exhibit space in Spaceship Earth's post show called Project Tomorrow: Inventing the Wonders of the Future opens.
- July 5, 2007: Epcot Vice President Jim Macphee announces the removal of the wand structure in time for the park's 25th anniversary on October 1, 2007.
- July 9, 2007: Closes for a fourth renovation. Removal of the wand structure begins.
- August 24, 2007: Removal of the wand structure completed.
- December 8, 2007: Guest previews of fourth edition begin.
- February 15, 2008: Fourth edition opens to the general public. New narration by Dame Judi Dench.
- March 4, 2008: Spaceship Earth is rededicated.
- October 1, 2012: Spaceship Earth and Epcot celebrate their 30th anniversary.
- June 30, 2017: Siemens announces the end of their Disney sponsorships, including Spaceship Earth.
- October 1, 2017: Spaceship Earth and Epcot celebrate their 35th anniversary.
- October 10, 2017: Official last day of the Siemens sponsorship.
- August 25, 2019: Fifth renovations coming to Spaceship Earth are announced. New scenes and new narrative about "human experience".
- June 20, 2020: Large-scale refurbishment postponed indefinitely.
- October 1, 2022: Spaceship Earth and Epcot celebrate their 40th anniversary, which is part of Walt Disney World's 50th Anniversary celebration.
- October 2, 2022: Spaceship Earth and Epcot hosted their 40th anniversary after party, which was a huge part of Disney's World's 50th Anniversary celebration.
- June 4, 2025: A new lounge space in Spaceship Earth's post-show called Geo–82 and Geo–82 Fireworks Experience opens.
- August 15, 2026: Fifth renovations coming to Spaceship Earth are re-announced. New scenes about "human connection" and referred to as its "next chapter".

=== Narrators ===
- Vic Perrin: October 1, 1982 – May 25, 1986
- Walter Cronkite: May 29, 1986 – August 15, 1994
- Jeremy Irons: November 23, 1994 – July 9, 2007
- Judi Dench: December 8, 2007 – present

== In other media ==
=== Television adaptation ===
A television series inspired by Spaceship Earth was given a pilot order in August 2026 on Disney+. Jason Fuchs will showrun and co-write the pilot alongside Michael Waldron, with Lee Toland Krieger directing and 20th Television producing.

== See also ==
- Epcot attraction and entertainment history
