= WEDway =

People-mover system

WEDway is a people mover system using linear induction motor (LIM) technology to propel vehicles along a pair of steel rails. It features constantly-moving vehicles, which are passively propelled by drive units in the track, that slow down and ride bumper-to-bumper through the loading station alongside a moving walkway or turntable.

The drive units, in various iterations, have used rubber-tired wheels driven by rotary synchronous and induction motors as well as linear induction motors.

This system was developed by WED Enterprises (now Walt Disney Imagineering) and first deployed in the Ford Magic Skyway attraction at the 1964–65 New York World's Fair. It has since been installed at places such as Disneyland (as the PeopleMover), Walt Disney World Resort's Magic Kingdom (as Tomorrowland Transit Authority PeopleMover), and George Bush Intercontinental Airport (as Subway) in Houston, Texas, United States. The system was originally planned to be the main commuting method in the planned EPCOT city.
