= Sansei Technologies =

Japanese manufacturing firm

Sansei Technologies, Inc.
- Former Sansei Yusoki logo used up until 2014
- Company type: Public KK
- Traded as: TYO: 6357
- Industry: Manufacturing
- Predecessor: Sansei Yusoki
- Founded: February 27, 1951
- Headquarters: Suita, Osaka, Japan
- Area served: Worldwide
- Key people: Makoto Nakagawa (President)
- Production output: Amusement rides, stage equipment, and elevators
- Number of employees: 700 (2013)
- Subsidiaries: Sansei Maintenance; Sansei Facilities; San Ace; Telmic Corp. S&S - Sansei Technologies; Vekoma
- Website: www.sansei-technologies.com/eng/

Sansei Technologies, Inc. (formerly Sansei Yusoki Co., Ltd.) is a Japanese manufacturing firm based in Osaka, Japan. The company specialises in the manufacturing of amusement rides, stage equipment, and elevators.

== History ==
Sansei Yusoki was founded on February 27, 1951. Since then the company has expanded with many subsidiaries including Sansei Maintenance, Sansei Facilities, San Ace, and Telmic Corporation. In 2012, Sansei Yusoki acquired a majority stake in United States–based amusement ride manufacturing firm, S&S Worldwide. As of 2013, the company is led by President Makoto Nakagawa and employs 700 staff. On January 1, 2014, the company began operating as Sansei Technologies, Inc. On March 30, 2018, Sansei fully acquired Vekoma Rides, a Dutch manufacturer of roller coasters and other amusement rides.

== Amusement ride manufacturing ==
The majority of Sansei Technologies' manufacturing is done for Japanese parks. Despite that, Sansei Technologies' biggest clients are Disney and Universal, with many other amusement parks from across the world featuring amusement rides manufactured by the firm.

Amusement rides

Name	Park	Type	Opened	Status
Ant-Man and The Wasp: Nano Battle!	Hong Kong Disneyland	Omnimover	2019	Operating
Na'vi River Journey	(United States) Disney's Animal Kingdom	Darkride	2017	Operating
Observation Tower	Legoland Japan Resort	Gyro tower	2017	Operating
Imagination Celebration	Legoland Japan Resort	teacup ride	2017	Operating
Buzz Lightyear's Space Ranger Spin	(United States) Magic Kingdom	Omnimover	1998	Operating
Buzz Lightyear's Astro Blasters	(Japan) Tokyo Disneyland	Omnimover	2004	Removed
Buzz Lightyear Astro Blasters	(United States) Disneyland	Omnimover	2005	Operating
Buzz Lightyear Astro Blasters	Hong Kong Disneyland	Omnimover	2005	Removed
Buzz Lightyear Laser Blast	(France) Disneyland Paris	Omnimover	2006	Operating
Giant Frisbee	(Japan) Nagashima Spa Land	Frisbee	Unknown	Operating
The Little Mermaid: Ariel's Undersea Adventure	(United States) Disney California Adventure	Omnimover	2011	Operating
Under the Sea: Journey of the Little Mermaid	(United States) Magic Kingdom	Omnimover	2012	Operating
Paratrouper	(Japan) Nagashima Spa Land	Paratrooper	Unknown	Operating
Rock'n'Roll	(Japan) Nagashima Spa Land	Unknown	Unknown	Operating
Skytower	(United States) SeaWorld San Diego	Observation tower	1969	Operating
Telecombat	(Japan) Nagashima Spa Land	Aerial carousel	Unknown	Operating
Top Spin	(Japan) Nagashima Spa Land	Top Spin	Unknown	Operating
Unknown	(Japan) Expoland	Flume Ride	Unknown	Removed
Wreck-It Ralph attraction	(Japan) Tokyo Disneyland	Omnimover	2026	Under construction

== List of roller coasters ==
As of 2019, Sansei Technologies has built 20 roller coasters around the world.

Name	Model	Park	Country	Opened	Status	Ref
Big One	Unknown	Takarazuka Garden Fields	Japan	1987	Removed	
Space Coaster	Unknown	Takarazuka Garden Fields	Japan	Unknown	Removed	
Jungle Mouse	Jungle Mouse	Hamanako Pal Pal	Japan	Unknown	Operating	
Western Loop	Unknown	Hamanako Pal Pal	Japan	Unknown	Removed	
Wave Coaster	Unknown	Takarazuka Garden Fields	Japan	1952	Removed	
Bobsleigh	Unknown	Nara Dreamland	Japan	1961	Removed	
Giant Coaster	Unknown	Fuji-Q Highland	Japan	1966	Removed	
Daidarasaurus	Unknown	Expoland	Japan	1970	Removed	
Jet Coaster	Unknown	Enakyo Wonderland	Japan	1970	Removed	
Jungle Adventure	Unknown	GrinPa	Japan	1973	Removed	
Jet Coaster	Unknown	Everland	South Korea	1976	Removed	
Lady Bird Coaster	Jungle Mouse	New Reoma World	Japan	1991	Operating	
Spaceship 2056	Space Coaster	New Reoma World	Japan	1991	Operating	
Titán; Formerly Cascabel; Formerly Sky Streak; Formerly Thunderbolt	Unknown	Selva Mágica; Boblo Island	Mexico	1994; 1973 to 1993	Operating	
Jungle Mouse	Jungle Mouse	Oyama Yuenchi	Japan	1997	Removed	
Mad Mouse	Unknown	Fuji-Q Highland	Japan	1998	Removed	
Rock 'N Roll Duncan	Unknown	Fuji-Q Highland	Japan	1999	Operating	
Steampunk Coaster Iron Bull; Formerly Bullfight Roller Coaster Matador; Formerly Super Express Iberia	Unknown	Parque Espana-Shima Spain Village	Japan	2003	Operating	
Panic Drive; Formerly Skip Coaster	Unknown	Nasu Highland Park; Takarazuka Garden Fields	Japan	2004; Unknown	Operating	
Twist Coaster Robin	Unknown	Yomiuriland	Japan	2014	Removed	
Bullet Train; Formerly Odin Express	Unknown	Gingko Lake Amusement Park; Kurashiki Tivoli Park	China	2015; Unknown	Operating	
