= Buzz Lightyear's Space Ranger Spin =

Dark ride attraction at Disney parks

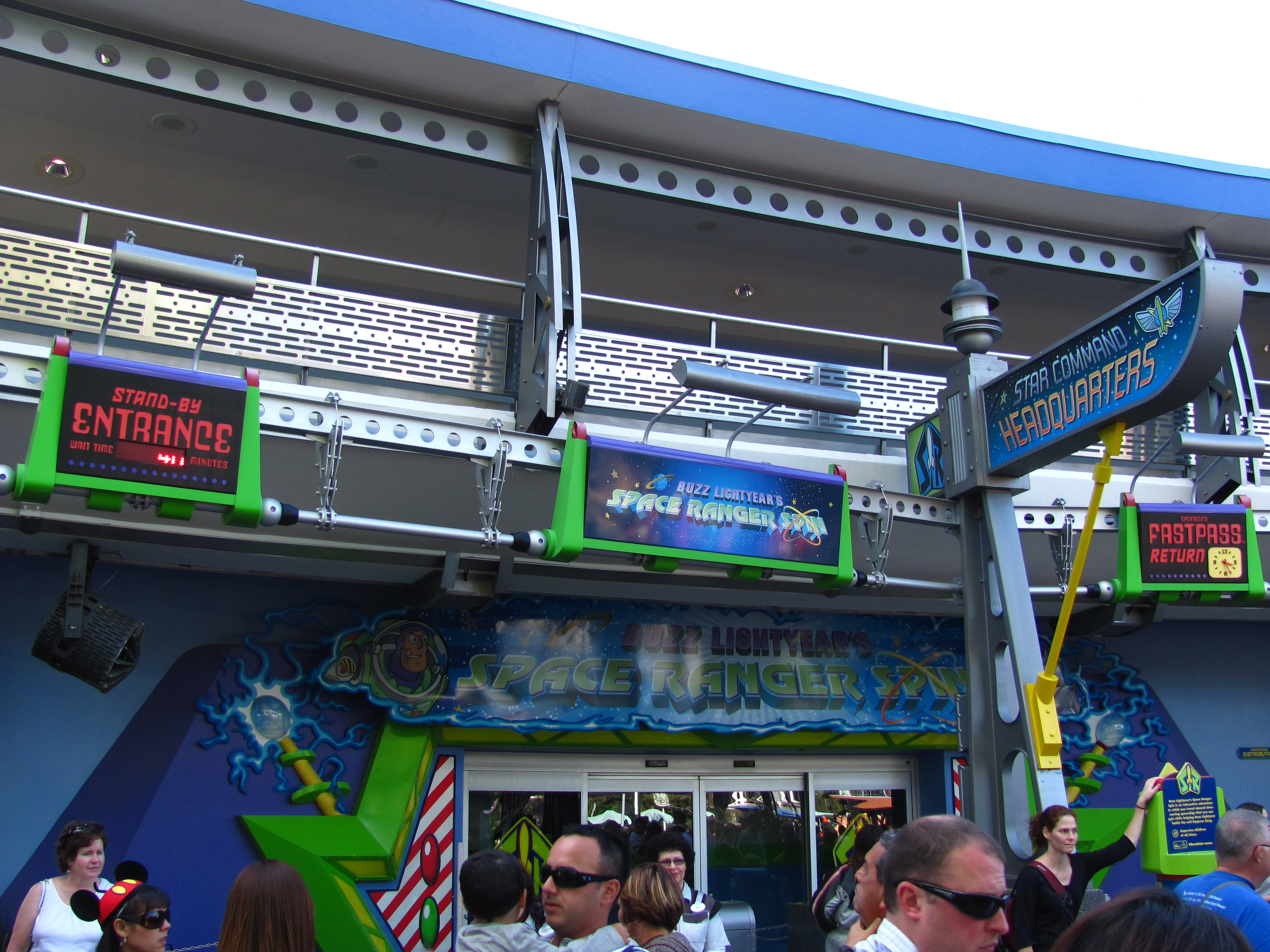
- Attraction entrance at Walt Disney World Resort, before the 2026 refurbishment

Magic Kingdom
- Name: Buzz Lightyear's Space Ranger Spin
- Area: Tomorrowland
- Coordinates: 28.4183°N 81.5798°W
- Status: Operating
- Soft opening date: October 7, 1998 (original); March 30, 2026 (refurbishment)
- Opening date: November 3, 1998 (original); April 8, 2026 (refurbishment)
- Closing date: August 4, 2025 (original)
- Replaced: Delta Dreamflight
- Lightning Lane available

Tokyo Disneyland
- Name: Buzz Lightyear's Astro Blasters
- Area: Tomorrowland
- Coordinates: 35.6328°N 139.8789°E
- Status: Closed
- Opening date: April 15, 2004
- Closing date: October 31, 2024
- Replaced: Visionarium
- Replaced by: Sugar Rush: Sweet Rescue

Disneyland
- Name: Buzz Lightyear Astro Blasters
- Area: Tomorrowland
- Coordinates: 33.8124°N 117.9178°W
- Status: Operating
- Soft opening date: March 10, 2005
- Opening date: March 17, 2005
- Replaced: Rocket Rods (queue)
- Lightning Lane available

Hong Kong Disneyland
- Name: Buzz Lightyear Astro Blasters 巴斯光年星際歷險
- Area: Tomorrowland
- Coordinates: 22.3139°N 114.0425°E
- Status: Closed
- Opening date: September 12, 2005
- Closing date: August 31, 2017
- Replaced by: Ant-Man and The Wasp: Nano Battle!

Disneyland Park (Paris)
- Name: Buzz Lightyear Laser Blast
- Area: Discoveryland
- Coordinates: 48.8735°N 2.7775°E
- Status: Operating
- Opening date: April 8, 2006
- Replaced: Visionarium
- Disney Premier Access available

Shanghai Disneyland
- Name: Buzz Lightyear Planet Rescue 巴斯光年星际营救
- Area: Tomorrowland
- Coordinates: 31.835°N 121.3913°E
- Status: Operating
- Soft opening date: May 7, 2016
- Opening date: June 16, 2016
- Disney Premier Access available

Ride statistics
- Attraction type: Shooting dark ride
- Manufacturers: Arrow Development (Magic Kingdom); Sansei Yusoki (Tokyo)
- Designer: Walt Disney Imagineering
- Theme: Buzz Lightyear (Toy Story)
- Music: Randy Newman
- Vehicle type: Omnimover
- Riders per vehicle: 2-3
- Duration: 4-5 minutes
- Queue host: Buzz Lightyear
- Ride host: Buzz Lightyear
- Sponsor: Mattel (1998–1999; Magic Kingdom)
- Wheelchair accessible

Buzz Lightyear's Space Ranger Spin at Magic Kingdom (also known as Buzz Lightyear Astro Blasters at Disneyland, Buzz Lightyear Laser Blast at Disneyland Park (Paris) and Buzz Lightyear Planet Rescue at Shanghai Disneyland) is an interactive shooting dark ride attraction located in the Tomorrowland area of the Disney theme parks. Designed by Walt Disney Imagineering, this attraction combines a carnival game and a third-generation Omnimover system. It is inspired by Disney/Pixar's Toy Story franchise, and contains several elements loosely based on the cartoon series Buzz Lightyear of Star Command.

The attraction first opened at Magic Kingdom on November 3, 1998. Subsequent versions can be found at Disneyland, Disneyland Park Paris, and Shanghai Disneyland. Although each ride may have a different name, all share the same major plot and characters. The attraction previously operated at Hong Kong Disneyland as Buzz Lightyear Astro Blasters until its closure on August 31, 2017, and at Tokyo Disneyland as Buzz Lightyear’s Astro Blasters until it closed on October 31, 2024.

== Plot ==
The backstory of the ride revolves around the attempts of Evil Emperor Zurg (voiced by Ken Mitchroney in Space Ranger Spin, Tesshō Genda in Astro Blasters at Tokyo Disneyland, Andrew Stanton at Astro Blasters in Disneyland and Hong Kong Disneyland and Laurent Gamelon in Astro Blasters in Disneyland Paris, and an unknown actor in Planet Rescue) to steal the batteries (known as "crystallic fusion cells") used to power the space vehicles of the "Little Green Men" (voiced by Jeff Pidgeon). Participants are "Star Command" raw recruits sent to defeat Zurg. The queue area is awash in the chartreuse, white, and bright blue hues of Buzz Lightyear (voiced by Jeff Bergman in Florida and Pat Fraley in all other English versions of the attraction. Since Buzz Lightyear is a toy, the attraction is scaled to give the illusion that one has been reduced to the size of an action figure, featuring such detail as giant, exposed Philips screw heads and an explanation of the interactive phase of the ride that resembles a toy's instruction sheet, only on a gigantic scale. An Audio-Animatronic Buzz Lightyear figure and giant Etch-a-Sketch (Disneyland) and/or View-Master (Walt Disney World) provide explanation of the "mission" to destroy Zurg's secret weapon with your blasters. While his body is audio-animatronic, Buzz's face is a screen with a projection of computer animation.

== Technical aspects ==
"Astro Blasters" and "Space Ranger Spin" are equal parts shooting gallery and dark ride. Visitors board an Omnimover space vehicle featuring two laser pistols and a joystick. The pistols are used to shoot laser beams at targets of varying point values. Targets that are hit while lit up will produce much higher scores. A digital readout on the dashboard shows the player's score. The joystick allows full 360-degree rotation of the vehicle to assist in aiming. During the ride, if the ride slows down or completely stops (this is a result of either a disabled guest or a ride breakdown), this allows for "bonus points" as the pistols and targets do not turn off. There are 4 different shaped targets which are worth different numbers of points: round (100 points), square (1,000 points), diamond (5,000 points), and triangle (10,000 points).

At the conclusion of the ride, the digital score flashes L1-L7 displaying the ranking or level achieved for the below scores:

- Level 1 Star Cadet: 0 – 1,000
- Level 2 Space Scout: 1,001 – 10,000
- Level 3 Ranger 1st Class: 10,001 – 100,000
- Level 4 Planetary Pilot: 100,001 – 300,000
- Level 5 Space Ace: 300,001 – 600,000
- Level 6 Cosmic Commando: 600,001 – 999,998
- Level 7 Galactic Hero: 999,999+

Some of the rides feature an on-ride photo, which depending on the park may be available as a free electronic postcard via e-mail at the exit, or be available for purchase on the Disney's PhotoPass system. The photos include the player's score. If the score is in the top 100 highest of the day, the player's ranking may be included in the photo. The Top 10 players' scores are shown on the scoreboard at the exit queue. The top person gets their face posted on the screen. The Disneyland version once featured at-home play tied directly to the attraction itself via the Internet, however this is disabled.

The installation at the Magic Kingdom utilizes an existing ride system by Arrow Development, originally constructed in 1972 for If You Had Wings. The ride was designed and manufactured by Sansei Technologies, Inc. with the corporation of Walt Disney Imagineering.

== History ==
=== Magic Kingdom ===
The layout and systems of the ride date back to 1972. This space was originally home to If You Had Wings, an aviation themed ride sponsored by Eastern Airlines. Eastern Airlines dropped sponsorship of the ride for financial reasons in early June 1987. All Eastern themes were removed, and the ride was renamed If You Could Fly. If You Could Fly was closed down in January 1989.

The installation of Space Ranger Spin also impacted the Tomorrowland Transit Authority PeopleMover, which runs through the south show building. The Tomorrowland Transit Authority, or TTA as it is often called for short, had opened in 1975 as the WEDway PeopleMover. At that time, If You Had Wings was the attraction occupying the south show building. Three diorama windows were also positioned on the track: two on the right and one on the left. These allowed the Mexico, Jamaica, and Trinidad scenes to be visible to riders on the Tomorrowland Transit Authority in such a way as to hide all projectors, lights and other show support equipment.

The diorama windows were altered once more when If You Had Wings was transformed into Delta Dreamflight. This was done because the windows no longer correctly lined up with show scenes. The first window was replaced with backlit panels depicting the ride's barnstormer scene. Window two looked into the Parisian Excursion scene, from a viewpoint which heavily distorted the tableau's forced perspective. The third window would have had TTA riders looking directly into an extremely bright light and so was completely obscured with plywood and black fabric.

In October 1997, Disney announced that Buzz Lightyear's Space Ranger Spin would be added to Magic Kingdom. When Delta Dreamflight transitioned yet again into the current attraction in 1998, the first window was refitted with the diorama of the hair salon, and the second left open to look into the new attraction, though concern was expressed over the fact that this view allows TTA riders to look directly into banks of high-powered blacklights. At one point during Space Ranger Spin, it is possible to catch a glimpse of the TTA passing through the building. The ride was briefly sponsored by Mattel from opening day to 1999.

Buzz Lightyear's Space Ranger Spin was named the 2004 Disney Magazine Reader's Choice Award winner for Best Magic Kingdom Park Attraction for Young Kids. On March 26, 2025, Magic Kingdom announced that the original version of the attraction would be temporarily closed on August 4, 2025, for refurbishment, and it reopened on April 8, 2026, with new vehicles, blasters, targets, animatronics, and scenes, and a new robot character named "Buddy".

=== Disneyland ===
Like the Magic Kingdom version at Walt Disney World, it uses infrastructure from previous attractions. Its show building originally housed the Circle-Vision 360° theater. In 1997, as part of a major makeover of Tomorrowland, the Circle-Vision theater was removed and the space became part of the queue for Rocket Rods, which operated from 1998 to 2000. This space was then unused until 2005, when Astro Blasters opened.

== Queue ==
=== Magic Kingdom ===
The queue of the ride shows different pictures of Buzz Lightyear and the Little Green Men. It also shows the battery cells and pipes plugging into Star Command. The rookie Space Rangers then pass Buzz himself, briefing the new recruits on their mission to battle Zurg, as a large wanted poster that declares Zurg public enemy number one is stationed next to the viewmaster. Rookies are directed to leave the briefing room, and report to the flight deck, allowing them to board XP 37 Star Cruiser. Attached to them are ion laser cannons and a joystick to spin the cart, and in the flight deck is a mural featuring Buzz and the Green Squadron battling Zurg's forces (which has since been updated to resemble the ones found at Tokyo Disneyland, Disneyland, Hong Kong Disneyland, and Disneyland Paris).

=== Tokyo Disneyland/Disneyland/Hong Kong Disneyland/Disneyland Paris ===
This ride's queue (as well as the other clones with these blueprints) includes a walkie talkie with Buzz Lightyear on it reading his wrist communication device. The speakers provide the following backstory to the ride: Zurg is attacking Green Planet, home of the Little Green Men, as well as several Space Rangers being attacked and possibly neutralized by Zurg himself and the Giant Robot army in Sector 9. Zurg himself patches in a call declaring his plan, claiming that not even Buzz Lightyear can stop him now. The queue, as well as featuring posters from the Florida attraction, also features a poster depicting Buzz Lightyear shooting a purple, green and orange colored alien, and one depicting Lightyear leading a team of Space Rangers, which includes a character that strikingly resembles Princess Mira Nova from the film and the TV show Buzz Lightyear of Star Command: The Adventure Begins and Buzz Lightyear of Star Command. The rookies enter the briefing room to see Buzz himself, who (much like the Florida attraction) debriefs guests about the mission. The only difference between the two debriefs is that the future versions of the attraction included a line about Zurg's reason for his use of the batteries, which is followed by Buzz firing an Astro Blaster at the Etch a Sketch, which will feature a drawing of Zurg, before disintegrating into nothing. The rookies proceed down a long Corridor seeing the LGMs testing the Blasters, maps of the Galactic Alliance, or the targets. The rookies then board their star cruisers on the flight deck, equipped with Astro Blasters, and (in the case of the California, Hong Kong, and Paris versions of the ride), surrounded by a mural of Buzz, alongside some LGMs, battling Zurg's robot army. Each of the queues are different in each iteration, but all are similar in design and concept.

=== Shanghai Disneyland ===
This queue takes on a more futuristic and grounded approach to fit within the more futuristic Tomorrowland as opposed to the more cartoony and colorful variations found elsewhere. The backstory is also slightly changed, with Zurg being based on his homeworld of Xrgthung, the same planet from the opening Toy Story 2. Zurg plans to utilize a massive laser cannon to destroy the homeworld of the Little Green Men. Buzz Lightyear himself has traveled to the planet in an attempt to stop him, and asks the rookie Space Rangers for help, allowing them to be jetosenned on Star Cruisers equipped with two laser blasters.

== Attraction ==
=== Magic Kingdom ===
The Magic Kingdom's version of the ride, known as Buzz Lightyear's Space Ranger Spin, is the first Buzz Lightyear attraction, and the third Omnimover ride to operate in Tomorrowland's south show building. Prior to 2026, Magic Kingdom's version features laser guns that are stationary. However as of the 2026 refurbishment, they are now handheld like the other versions.

The ride begins when the cart enters a room. Inside the room there is a robot named Buddy who helps train the guests before they enter space to defeat Zurg. Before the 2026 refurbishment, the scene was different and featured the "Astro-Accelerator." The old scene had multiple astronauts shooting canons at a disco ball mounted onto a pole. The ride then enters a robot attack scene. An orange robot called the Box-O-Bot (originally labeled as a Rock 'Em Sock 'Em Robot during the Mattel sponsorship), a blue and purple robot called the Gigantobot, a green robot called the Battery Bot, and a Dog Bot are all present in this scene. The ride then slopes down a short hill into Planet Z. Here guests encounter many aliens including space chickens, space spiders, and others. There is also a volcano that is shooting green goo. The guests then enter Zurg's fortress where they see a battery delivery and Zurg commanding his guards to seize the guests and "their little green friends, too." Zurg is in his spaceship, which he calls his Spiderbot. In the next room the aliens show the guests that Zurg has escaped. The next room is the projection tunnel and in it Zurg is shooting at Buzz Lightyear (Prior to the 2026 refurbishment it was the guests.) However Buzz manages to destroy the Spiderbot. The final room shows Buzz Lightyear fighting with Zurg in the now destroyed Spiderbot. The Little Green Men help Buzz tear it apart. Then the unload area shows Buzz Lightyear thanking the guests while holding Zurg in the claw. Zurg then threatens us that he'll be back. Guests will then exit the ride into Buzz's Star Command where they can purchase a photo of themselves on the ride.

Mattel originally sponsored the Magic Kingdom attraction from its opening to 1999. The Disney World version has been without sponsorship ever since.

=== Disneyland ===
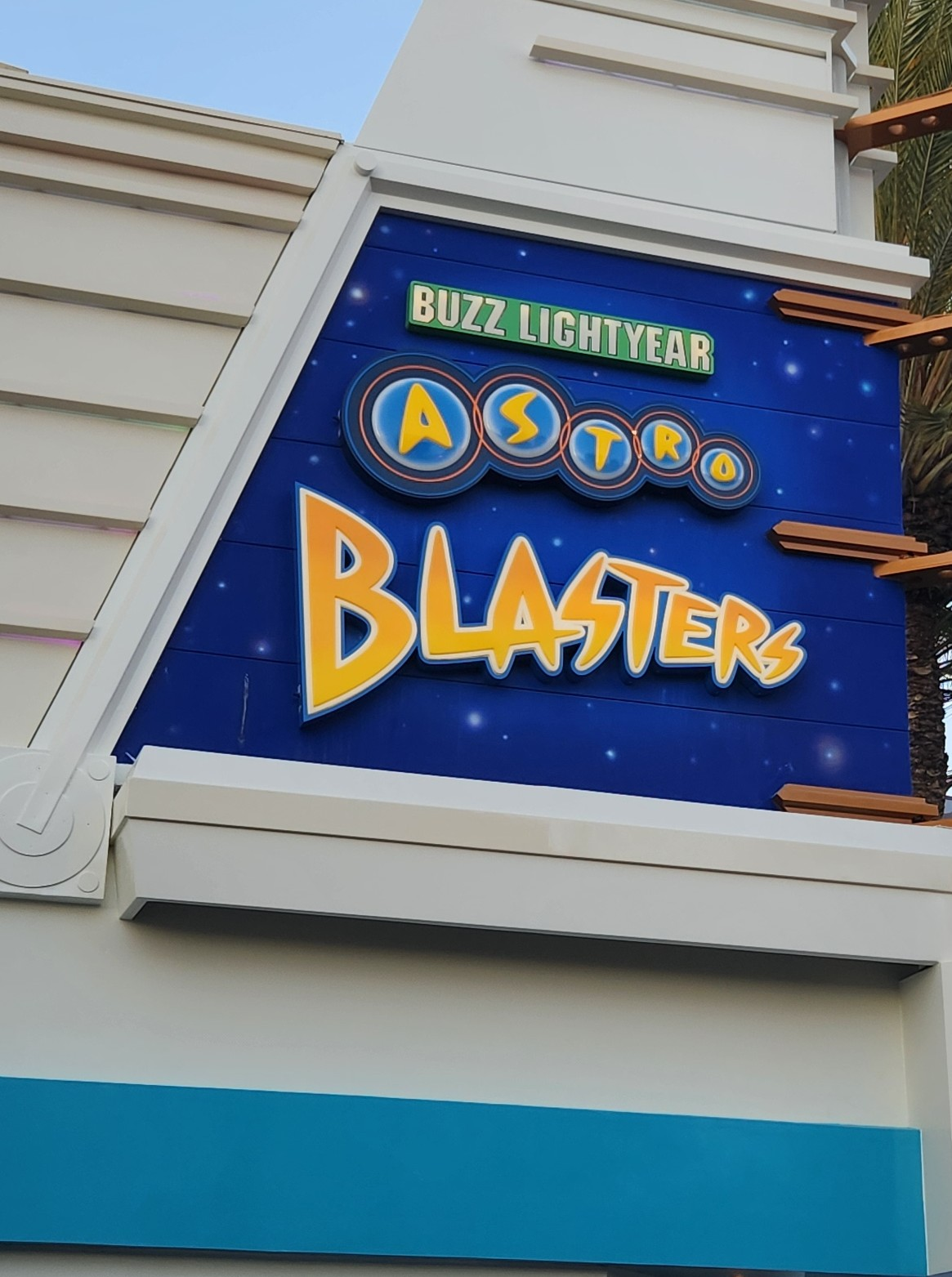
Buzz Lightyear Astro Blasters at Disneyland

Disneyland's version of the ride is called Buzz Lightyear Astro Blasters.

The ride begins as the rookies are jetosenned out into space and encountering Zurg's robot army. Despite repainting and repositioning, the army still consists of the Box-O-Bot, the Gigantobot, the Dogbot, and the Batterybot. The Guests enter Zurg's Dreadnought down a hallway shooting batteries until you reach his laboratory. Zurg himself is seen firing his ion blaster, infuriated of the guests' presence, their aim, their devotion to Star Command, and being knocked out of orbit. As the rookies leave the Dreadnought, a few robots attempt to land it safely, only to be electrocuted by the rookies and the failing equipment of the Dreadnought. The rookies enter Planet Z, encountering the hostile alien lifeforms surrounding the volcano. Before leaving Planet Z, Zurg, in his secret weapon, gloats at the rookies, taunting them of his supposed victory, declaring that Star Command will be his next target after he conquers Green Planet. The rookies re-enter space via a light speed tunnel with Zs around it. Out in space, Buzz Lightyear is using an Astro Blaster working alongside Green Squadron to take down Zurg's Secret Weapon, Zurg distraught and frustrated at his failure. The rookies arrive on Green Planet, where the LGMs signing the receipt to return Zurg to Al's Toy Barn. Zurg promises revenge as the Green Squadron and Buzz Lightyear thank the rookies. Buzz proceeds to remind the guests to put the Blasters in their holsters and to check their final score on the status board. Guests exit the ride to the gift shop, Little Green Men Store Command.

=== Hong Kong Disneyland and Tokyo Disneyland ===
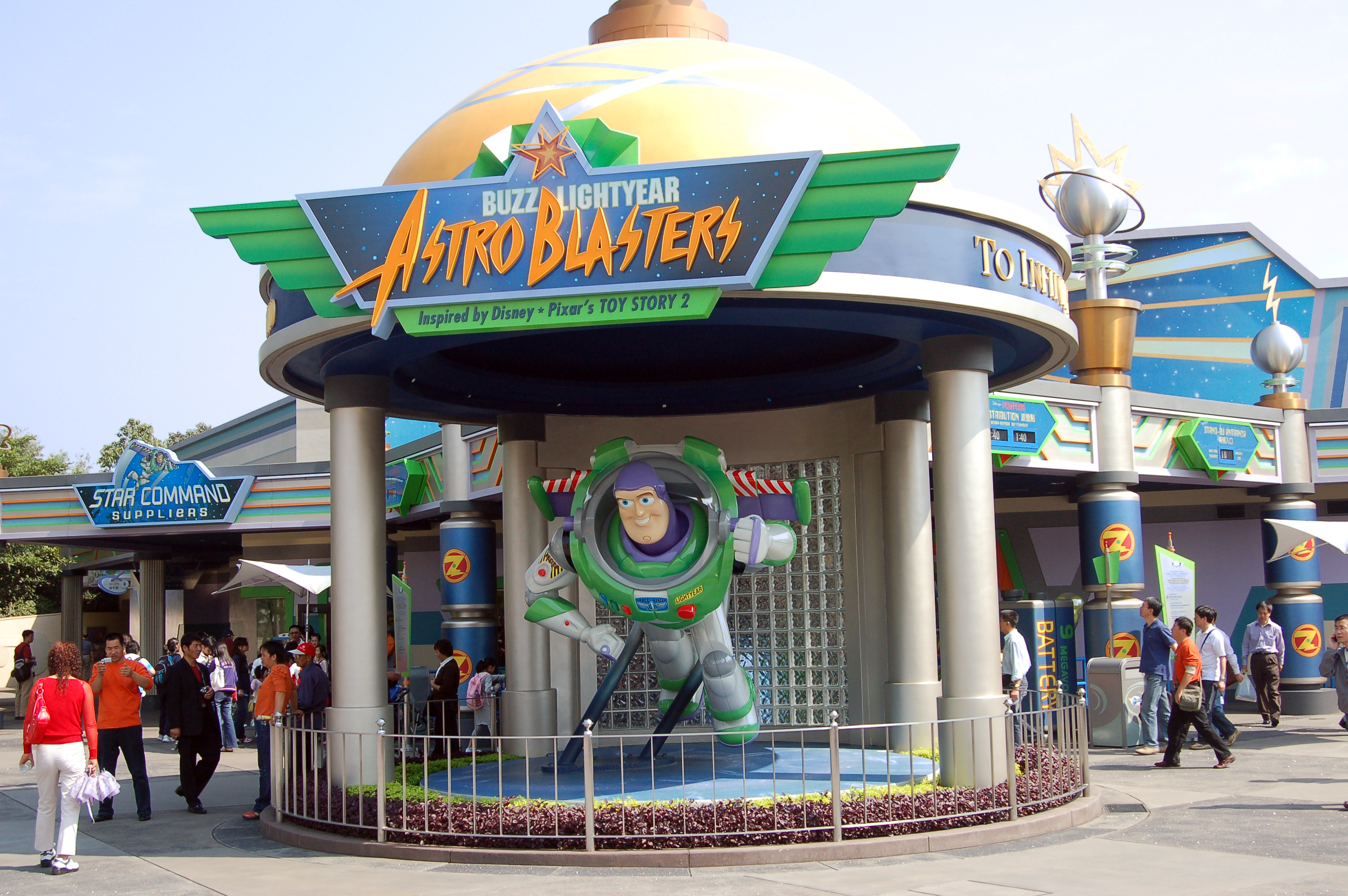
Former site of Buzz Lightyear Astro Blasters at Hong Kong Disneyland

The Tokyo version of the ride was called Buzz Lightyear's Astro Blasters and it was the original version of the second version of the ride and all of the ride's audio is in Japanese. At Hong Kong Disneyland, the ride was called Buzz Lightyear Astro Blasters and a highly identical clone of the Tokyo version with a more elaborate queue, with its entrance Buzz Lightyear statue being taken from the defunct DisneyQuest Chicago's Astro Blasters bumper car attraction. The Hong Kong version was also entirely in English, and only trilingual for safety rules. Those two versions also featured a floating Planet Z outside of the DreadNought. Their version's cruisers are called XP 38. On November 22, 2016, Disney announced that the Hong Kong version of the ride would be closing on August 31, 2017. In its place was the park's second Marvel-themed ride, Ant-Man and The Wasp: Nano Battle!, which became part of a new land, Stark Expo. In April 2024, it was announced that the Tokyo Disneyland version would close in October of that year, to be replaced with an attraction themed to the Wreck-It Ralph franchise, which was originally set to open in 2026, and it was delayed to Spring 2027.

=== Disneyland Park (Paris) ===
At Disneyland Park (Paris), Buzz Lightyear Laser Blast replaced the Circle-Vision 360° production Le Visionarium, which closed in 2004. This version of the ride is much like the Disneyland version, Buzz Lightyear Astro Blasters, except for the presence of a tribute to Le Visionarium in the robot attack scene with a hidden 9-Eye (the Circumvisual Photodroid from Le Visionarium).

In the Paris version of the ride, the dialogue is the same but translated into French as well as English. In the queue, the Buzz Lightyear animatronic speaks English, as well as French. Some areas of the ride provide both dialogues, but in the scene where Zurg's weapon is half-destroyed, it switches from English to French in a 6 dialogue loop as it does in the California version of the ride. This ride's cruiser is called the XP 41 calling back to the California version. This is also the version with the second longest indoor queue.

=== Shanghai Disneyland ===
The most recent version of this attraction is called Buzz Lightyear Planet Rescue. It is based on the opening sequence of Toy Story 2, set on Zurg's home planet of Xrgthung, and featuring the robots with similar designs to those seen in the film.

The rookies are brought onto the surface of the planet, encountering several Zurgbots, all of which are easily neutralized with their laser guns, and with the help of the Little Green Men, and Buzz Lightyear himself. The battle is mainly on the surface before being brought into Zurg's bunker, in which the defense systems are activated to prevent the rookies, Little Green Men, or Buzz himself from stopping the operation. Buzz continues to assist the rookies in destroying the defense systems and robots, and eventually encounter Zurg, having thwarted his plan. The evil Emperor swears vengeance as Buzz and the Little Green Men congratulate the rookies for their assistance to Star Command.

== Other appearances ==
Buzz Lightyear's Astroblaster

DisneyQuest
- Area: Replay Zone
- Status: Removed
- Opening date: June 19, 1998
- Closing date: July 2, 2017

Ride statistics
- Attraction type: Shooting bumper cars
- Designer: Walt Disney Imagineering
- Theme: Toy Story
- Vehicle type: Enclosed bumper cars
- Riders per vehicle: 1–2
- Duration: 5 minutes
- Height restriction: 51 in (130 cm)

In 2005, the Walt Disney Company premiered a home version of the ride in the form of an internet video game that allows users to connect with guests at the parks. The scores of each guest from the dark ride are tallied with the internet gamer and increase the points won.

There was also a bumper car attraction at Walt Disney World's DisneyQuest with the name "Buzz Lightyear's Astroblaster" where players rode and controlled enclosed bumper cars while shooting "asteroids" (black foam soccer balls) at each other. Getting hit by a ball at a specific target caused the cars to spin around and flash lights for a few seconds. However, that attraction was closed when DisneyQuest shut its doors in 2017.

The 2019 video game Kingdom Hearts III features a virtual version of the ride as one of its "Attraction Flow" theme park-inspired attacks, allowing the player to attack enemies with similar mechanics and visual style as the real ride.

== Voice cast ==
=== English version ===
- Pat Fraley (Disneyland) and Jeff Bergman (Magic Kingdom post-2026 refurbishment) as Buzz Lightyear
- Andrew Stanton (Disneyland and Magic Kingdom, post-2026 refurbishment) as Zurg
- Jeff Pidgeon as Green Squadron
- Peter Renaday as Space Ranger #1 (Disneyland versions only)
- B. J. Ward as Space Ranger #3 and Star Command (Disneyland versions only)
- Jeff Fischer as Space Ranger #4 (Disneyland versions only)

=== French Version ===
- Richard Darbois as Buzz Lightyear
- Laurent Gamelon as Zurg
- Christophe Lemoine as Green Squadron

== Gallery ==
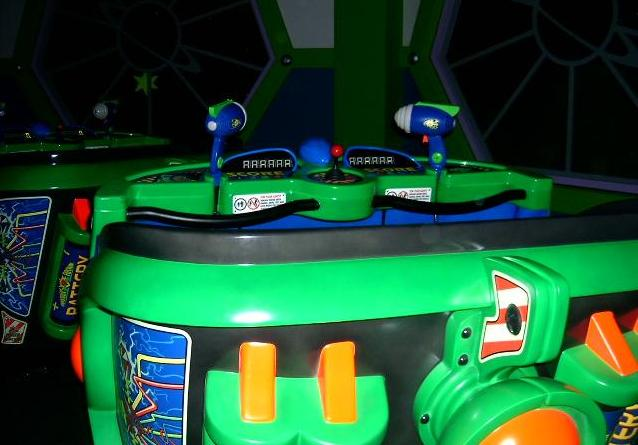
A space cruiser vehicle at Disneyland

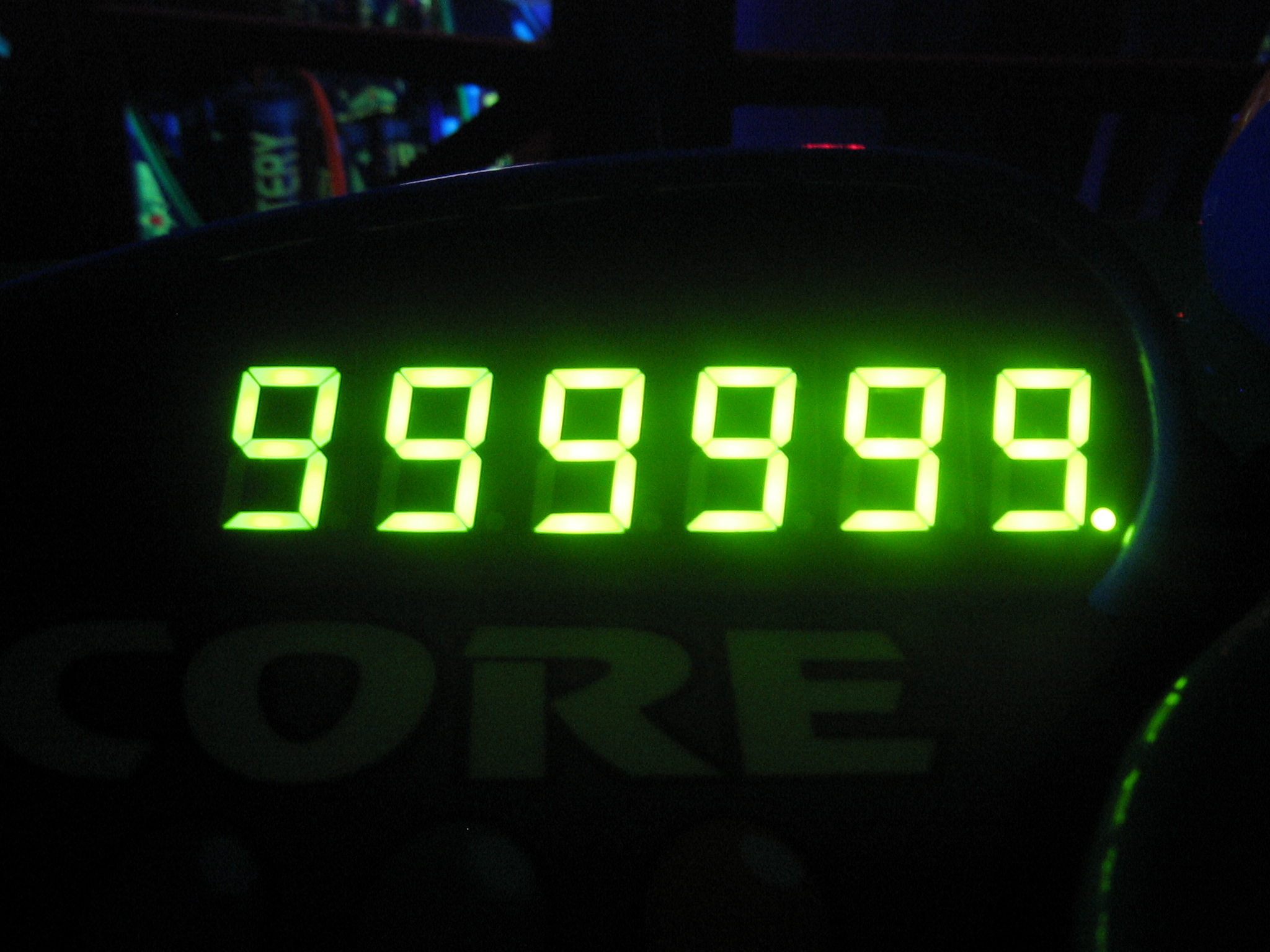
The maximum score of 999,999 on a Disneyland vehicle. The only way to view the actual score after surpassing 999,999 points is by e-mailing the onboard photo.

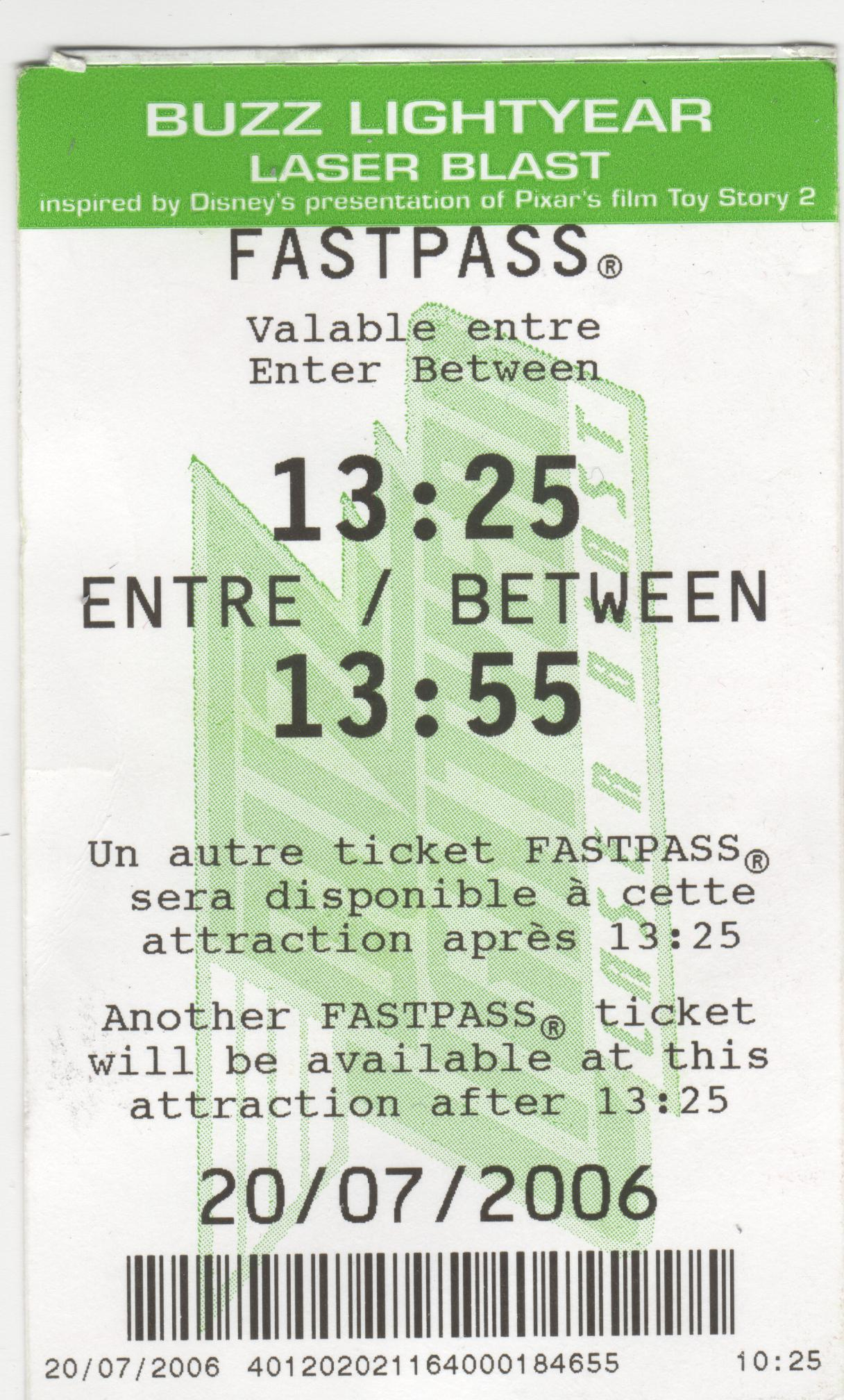
A Fast Pass ticket for the attraction at Disneyland Park Paris.

== See also ==
- Magic Kingdom attraction and entertainment history
- List of current Disneyland attractions
- Tokyo Disneyland attraction and entertainment history
- Toy Story Midway Mania
- Men in Black: Alien Attack, a similar ride at Universal Studios Florida based on the Men in Black film series
