= If You Had Wings =

Former ride at Walt Disney World

Coordinates: 28.418267°N 81.579595°W

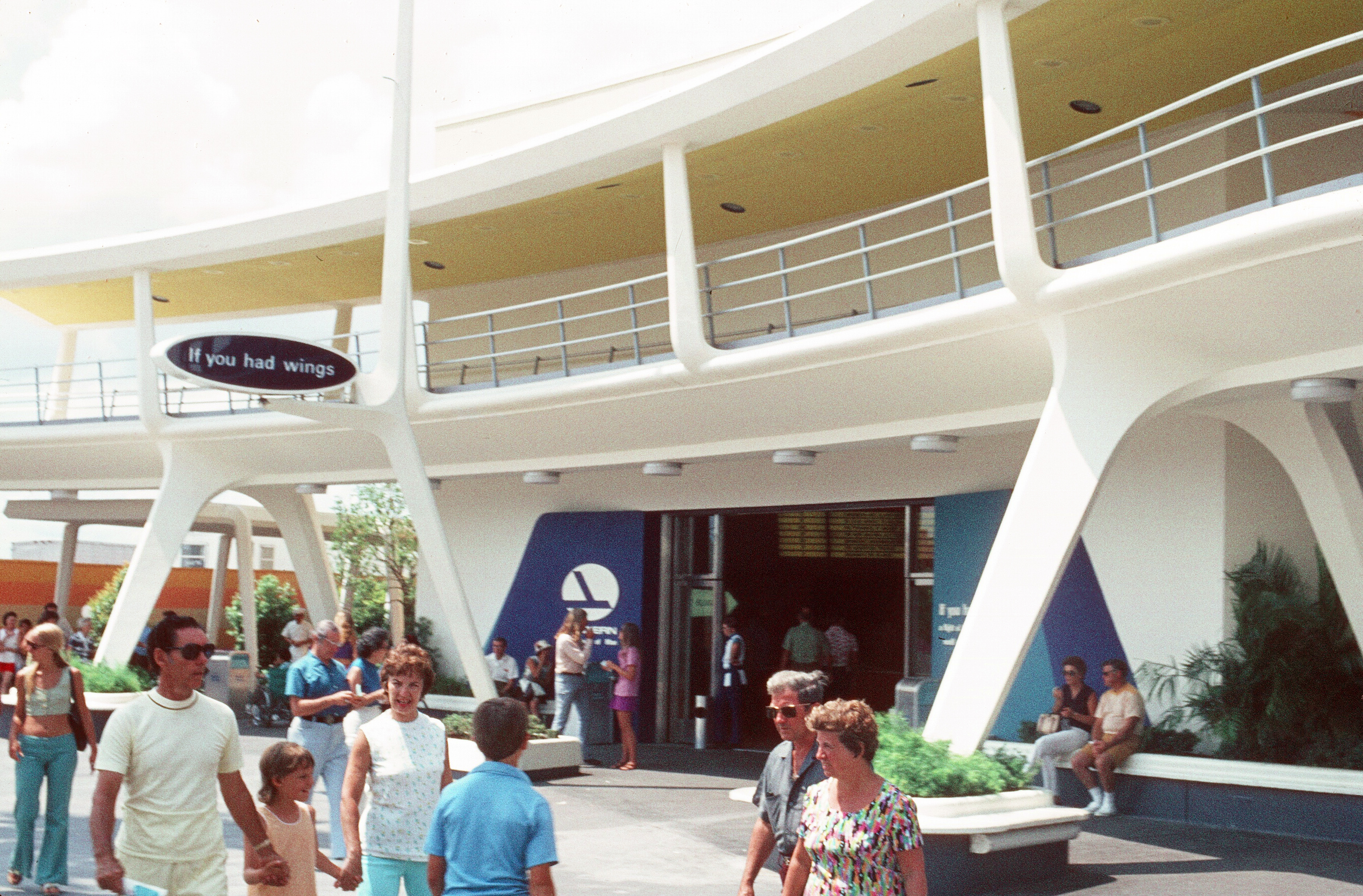

Magic Kingdom
- Area: Tomorrowland
- Status: Removed
- Opening date: June 5, 1972
- Closing date: January 3, 1989
- Replaced by: Delta Dreamflight

Ride statistics
- Attraction type: Dark ride
- Manufacturer: Arrow Development
- Designer: WED Enterprises
- Theme: Flight/Travel
- Music: "If You Had Wings"
- Vehicle type: Omnimover
- Riders per vehicle: 2-3
- Duration: 4:30
- Sponsor: Eastern Air Lines (1972–1987)

If You Had Wings was an attraction at Walt Disney World. It was a two-person Omnimover dark ride in Tomorrowland in the Magic Kingdom, sponsored by Eastern Air Lines. It featured travel destinations throughout the Caribbean and elsewhere, all of which were served by Eastern. It had an eponymous theme song by Buddy Baker.

== Overview ==
Guests passed through a series of colorful theater-like sets with rear-projected short scenes of straw-hat markets, fishermen, limbo dancers, and steel drum bands. Locations featured various Eastern destinations, like Mexico, Bermuda, Puerto Rico, the Bahamas, Jamaica, Trinidad, and New Orleans.

Then, the vehicles reclined into a room with projected snippets of flights taking off on an ovoid-shaped surface. Next, film of snow-covered mountains reflected on floor-to-ceiling mirrors.

As guests disembarked to an area containing an Eastern Air Lines reservation desk, an agent stood ready to assist riders with travel arrangements.

Diorama windows allowed the Mexico, Jamaica, and Trinidad scenes to be visible from the WEDWay PeopleMover.

In 1987, Eastern withdrew its sponsorship and the attraction closed on June 1 of that year. Eastern itself went out of business four years later.

== Successors ==
After the closing of the original attraction, new attractions were created to inhabit the same space.

=== If You Could Fly ===
Disney removed all references to Eastern, changed the name of the ride to If You Could Fly, and re-opened it on June 6, 1987. The sets and films were intact, but the theme music had been replaced. On January 4, 1989, If You Could Fly was permanently closed.

=== Delta Dreamflight ===
Soon after, Delta Air Lines took over sponsorship and made plans to update and remodel the attraction. The replacement was Delta Dreamflight, which made use of the same ride system and floor layout, but all-new scenery and music.

=== Take Flight ===
Delta dropped its sponsorship in June 1996. WDW removed all references to Delta and renamed the attraction Take Flight. The ride lasted two years, closing in January 1998. Unlike the musical change from If You Had Wings to If You Could Fly, Take Flight's music was the same as Dreamflight's except for minor alterations to the lyrics.

=== Buzz Lightyear's Space Ranger Spin ===
Disney now uses the space for the attraction Buzz Lightyear's Space Ranger Spin, where riders can control the rotation of their vehicle via joysticks, and are armed with laser cannons to shoot at targets stationed throughout the attraction. Many of the elements in this attraction are similar to If You Had Wings, including the speed tunnel with the projections on the walls, and the loading and unloading areas. Buzz Lightyear sign above the door is in the shape of a cloud and was painted over after the attraction was renamed.

== See also ==
- Magic Kingdom attraction and entertainment history
