= Omnimover =

Amusement ride system in Disney parks

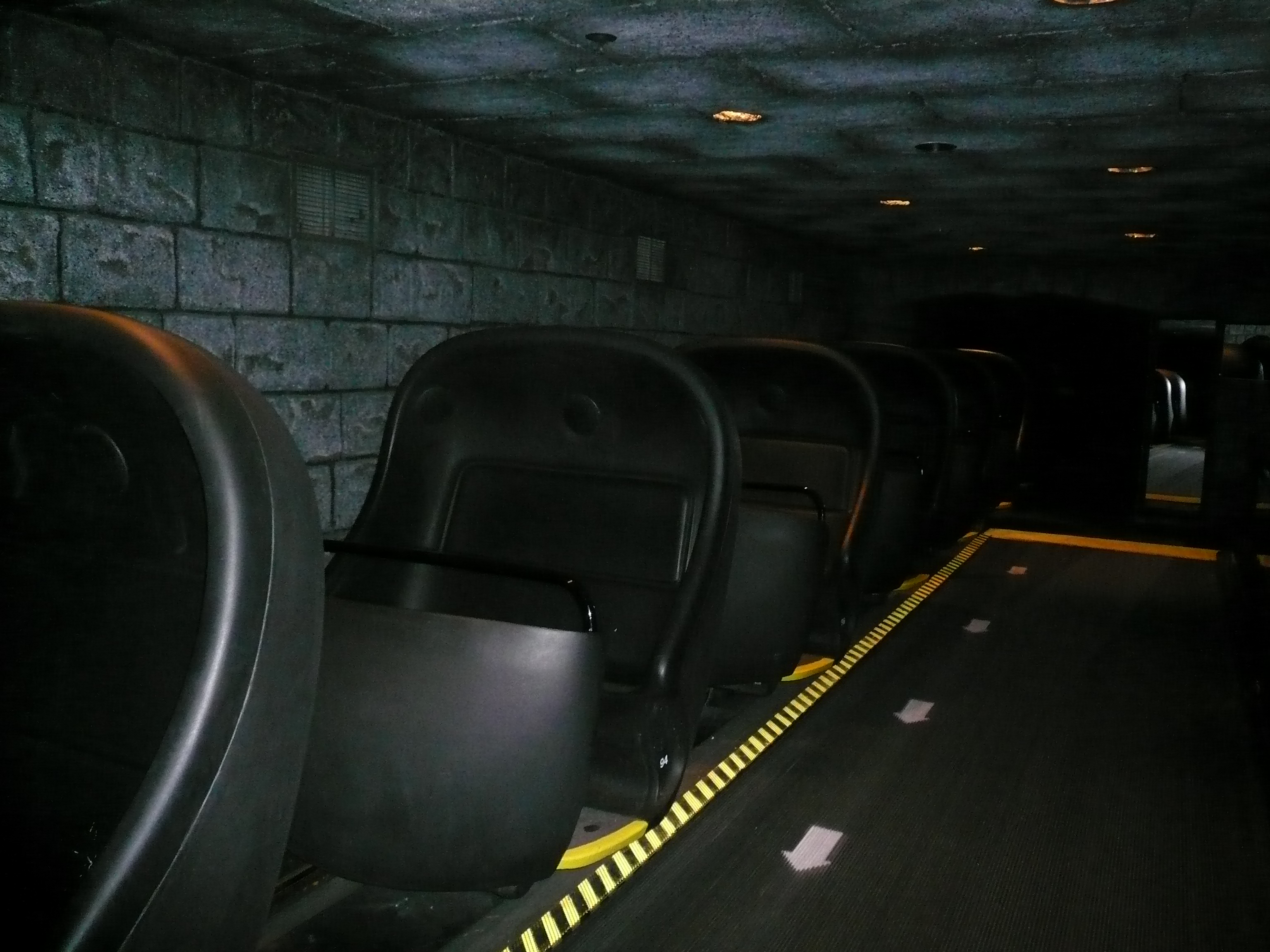

The Omnimover is an amusement ride system used for Disney theme park attractions. Roger Broggie and Bert Brundage developed the system for WED Enterprises, which patented Omnimover in April 1968. The term was coined by Imagineer Bob Gurr. Outside of Disney, it is sometimes known as an Endless Transit System.

The ride system was descended from the PeopleMover ride system developed for Ford's Magic Skyway at the 1964 New York World's Fair. It featured continuously moving ride vehicles like its predecessor, but also had the ability to swivel each car 360 degrees so that riders would see what the ride designers intended them to see.

The first Omnimover was developed for Adventure Thru Inner Space, a Disneyland attraction that opened in 1967.

== Description ==
The Omnimover system was created by Roger E. Broggie and Bert Brundage to provide a ride system capable of providing passengers with a motion-picture-type experience by controlling the line of sight. This concept also allows the designers to be able to place infrastructure elements of the attraction, such as lighting and projectors, behind the vehicles without concern for having the illusions of the attraction revealed to the riders. The system consists of a chain of vehicles operating on a track, usually hidden beneath the floor. The chain of vehicles maintains constant motion at a specific speed (usually about 2 feet or 60 centimeters per second throughout the entire course of the attraction. To facilitate boarding and disembarking from the vehicles, a conveyor belt moving at approximately the same speed as the ride vehicles parallels the track at the loading and unloading areas. Passengers step from the moving belt into the vehicle or vice versa.

One of the features that differentiates this system from other ride systems is the ability of the vehicle to be rotated to a predetermined orientation. Previous ride conveyor systems, such as Futurama at the 1939 New York World's Fair and Ford's Magic Skyway at the 1964 New York World's Fair, were not designed to allow the individual ride vehicles to rotate. In addition to the main ride rails, each vehicle also has two control rails attached to a wheel: one controls swiveling, allowing the vehicle to face in any direction at any point on the track, and the other allows the vehicle to tilt in relation to the inclining and declining portions of the track. Early Omnimovers such as for Adventure Thru Inner Space at Disneyland were manufactured by Arrow Development, with later systems such as the Buzz Lightyear attractions being manufactured by Sansei Yusoki.

Two Omnimover systems have been in continuous use since their debut but have featured different attractions:

- Buzz Lightyear's Space Ranger Spin at Tomorrowland in the Magic Kingdom uses the Omnimover ride system of two former attractions. The first attraction to occupy this space was If You Had Wings, which was sponsored by Eastern Airlines from 1972 to 1987, when they dropped sponsorship. The ride then was known as If You Could Fly until it was closed in January 1989. Six months later, the ride system was reused and transformed into Delta Dreamflight, which was sponsored by Delta Air Lines until 1996. The ride vehicles were reprogrammed in 1989 to alter their viewing direction. In 1996, the ride became known as Take Flight and closed on January 9, 1998. Buzz Lightyear's Space Ranger Spin uses the very same Omnimover ride system of If You Had Wings/Delta Dreamflight, except for having new third-generation vehicles that can be rotated by the riders to any angle to shoot at various targets. This variant and that used for The Little Mermaid: Ariel's Undersea Adventure use electric motors on the individual vehicles to rotate, instead of fixed control rails. Space Ranger Spin also uses two of the speed tunnels from If You Had Wings.
- The Seas with Nemo & Friends used to be home to The Living Seas, which used a different attraction theme and a different Omnimover vehicle design.

Although Journey Into Imagination with Figment in Epcot is now an Omnimover basis track, the original incarnation of the ride was a continuously moving vehicle system.

=== Current attraction series using the Omnimover system ===
- Haunted Mansion Series
  - Disneyland
  - Magic Kingdom at Walt Disney World
  - Tokyo Disneyland
  - Disneyland Park at Disneyland Paris (known as Phantom Manor)
- Buzz Lightyear Astro Blaster Series
  - Disneyland
  - Magic Kingdom at Walt Disney World
  - Disneyland Paris
  - Shanghai Disneyland
- The Little Mermaid: Ariel's Undersea Adventure
  - Disney California Adventure at the Disneyland Resort
  - Magic Kingdom at Walt Disney World

=== Current individual attractions using the Omnimover system ===
- Epcot
  - Spaceship Earth
  - The Seas with Nemo & Friends ^{System recycled from a previous attraction}
- Hong Kong Disneyland
  - Ant-Man and The Wasp: Nano Battle! (originally opened as Buzz Lightyear Astro Blasters)
- Tokyo Disneyland
  - Wreck-It Ralph attraction (Opening in 2026, originally opened as Buzz Lightyear's Astro Blasters)

=== Omnimover attractions no longer in operation ===
This list includes all Omnimover attractions that have been permanently removed and not recycled.

- Disneyland
  - Adventure Thru Inner Space (replaced with Star Tours in 1987)
- Epcot
  - World of Motion (replaced with Test Track in 1999)
  - Horizons (replaced with Mission: SPACE in 2003. Homages to Horizons can be found in both Mission: SPACE and in the Magic Kingdom's Space Mountain.)
  - Journey Into Imagination
- Hong Kong Disneyland
  - Buzz Lightyear Astro Blasters (rethemed into Ant-Man & The Wasp: Nano Battle! in 2019)
- Tokyo Disneyland
  - Buzz Lightyear's Astro Blasters (rethemed into Wreck-It Ralph attraction in 2026)

=== Current attractions using the Endless Transit System ===
- Carnival Festival - Efteling
- Geister Rikscha - Phantasialand
- Batalla del Alcazar "Adelante" - Shima Spain Village - Parque Espana
- Abenteuer Atlantis - Europa-Park
- Geisterschloss - Europa-Park
- Madame Freudenreich Curiosités - Europa-Park
- Hershey’s Chocolate Tour - Hershey's Chocolate World
- Phantom Theater: Opening Nightmare (formerly Boo Blasters on Boo Hill) - Kings Island
- Spirit Of London Ride - Madame Tussauds, London
- Yoshi's Adventure - Universal Studios Japan and Universal Epic Universe
- The Secret Life of Pets: Off the Leash! - Universal Studios Hollywood
- Reset - Mirabilandia

== Variations ==
- Horizons at EPCOT is notable for being the only attraction to utilize an inverted Omnimover. The vehicles did not rotate, but instead traveled sideways during the entire attraction.
- The Living Seas at EPCOT featured a short "sea-cab" trip that traveled through a tunnel into the pavilion's main aquarium. When the attraction was re-themed into The Seas with Nemo and Friends, the opening ride-through portion utilizing "clam-mobiles" was extended. Although visually similar to the Omnimover system, these vehicles do not tilt or rotate away from parallel to the track. This is due to the lack of space below the track for the mechanics and space in the ride area to place anything behind the vehicles for them to turn around to face.
- Buzz Lightyear is the only Omnimover-style ride where riders spin the vehicles manually.
- Journey Into Imagination at EPCOT used multiple individual trains of Omnimover-like cars. While the cars do rotate, they come to a full stop for loading and unloading of guests.
