= Delta Dreamflight =

Attraction at Walt Disney World (1989–1998)

Magic Kingdom
- Area: Tomorrowland
- Coordinates: 28.418267°N 81.579595°W
- Status: Removed
- Opening date: June 23, 1989
- Closing date: January 5, 1998
- Replaced: If You Had Wings/If You Could Fly
- Replaced by: Take Flight; Buzz Lightyear's Space Ranger Spin

Ride statistics
- Attraction type: Dark ride
- Manufacturer: Arrow Development
- Designer: WED Enterprises
- Theme: Flight
- Music: The Dreamflight Song by Edo Guidotti
- Vehicle type: Omnimover
- Riders per vehicle: 2-3

Delta Dreamflight, renamed Dreamflight and later Take Flight during its final two years of operation, was an attraction located in Magic Kingdom's Tomorrowland at the Walt Disney World Resort. It was sponsored by Delta Air Lines. Dreamflight replaced an attraction called If You Could Fly (originally If You Had Wings), sponsored by Eastern Air Lines.

== Overview ==
Dreamflight was a dark ride which showcased the history of flight using simplistic sets, some Audio-Animatronics, and projection effects, utilizing the Omnimover ride system.

Guests entered a queue mimicking an airport terminal. The front of a Delta Boeing 767 replica was situated on the left, giving the illusion that guests were actually boarding a jetliner named "The Spirit of Delta."

Aboard the attraction, guests first encountered a mural depicting the golden era of aviation in America, followed by a hot air balloon and other flying contraptions in the style of a pop-up book. Next, a giant crop field of the American mid-west in the roaring 1920s featured biplanes, stunt planes, and barnstormers, flying above.

Guests would then emerge onto a dock in the San Francisco Bay and into the fuselage of a Boeing 314 Flying Boat, before finding themselves in a garden of Tokyo and then the skyline of Paris. Entering the Jet Age, a spinning light along with fog gave the impression that they were entering the inside of a turbo jet engine.

Footage of a plane taking off simulated their flight's departure to the next area, flying through a canyon over water and through a futuristic city with fireworks. The final room showed giant pop-up book with destinations on the pages.

== Delta sponsorship ==
Delta sponsored the ride from its opening in 1989 through the end of 1995, as being the first renovations. The decision not to renew was made in part due to costs of sponsoring the 1996 Olympics in Atlanta, Georgia. From January 1, 1996, to June 4, 1996, the attraction was renamed simply Dreamflight, as the second renovations. On June 5, 1996, it reopened as Take Flight, as the third and final renovations. All references to Delta were removed, and the attraction's theme songs were rerecorded.

The attraction ultimately closed on January 5, 1998. It was replaced by the interactive dark ride Buzz Lightyear's Space Ranger Spin, inspired by Disney/Pixar's Toy Story films.

== See also ==
- Magic Kingdom attraction and entertainment history
