= Rocket Rods =

Former attraction at Disneyland

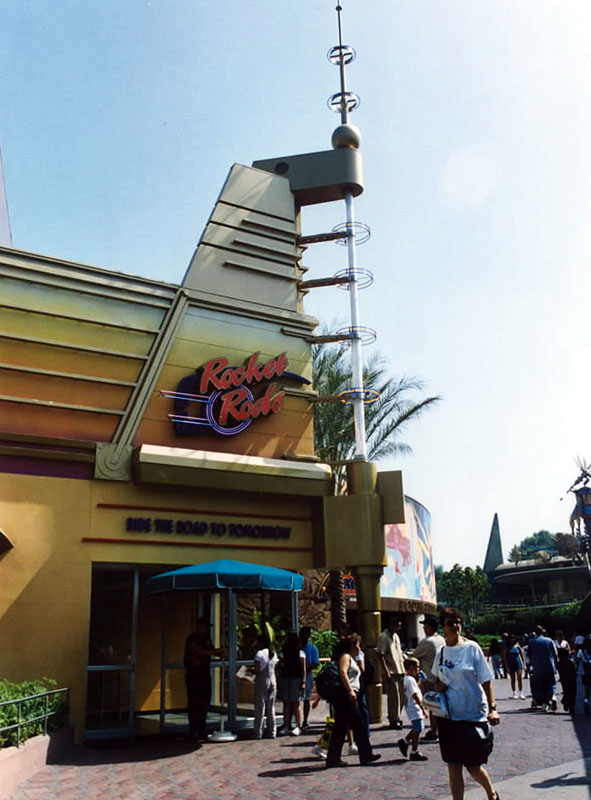
- The entrance to Rocket Rods

Disneyland
- Area: Tomorrowland
- Coordinates: 33°48′44″N 117°55′05″W
- Status: Removed
- Cost: $25,000,000
- Opening date: May 22, 1998
- Closing date: September 25, 2000 (maintenance pre-closure); April 27, 2001 (confirmed closure)
- Replaced: PeopleMover; America the Beautiful (queue)
- Replaced by: Buzz Lightyear Astro Blasters (queue)

Ride statistics
- Attraction type: "Prototype" Rapid Transportation System
- Manufacturer: Walt Disney Imagineering
- Designer: Walt Disney Imagineering
- Theme: Futuristic
- Music: "World of Creativity" - (Magic Highways of Tomorrow) written by the Sherman Brothers (music & lyrics)
- Height: 21 ft (6.4 m)
- Speed: 35 mph (56 km/h)
- Vehicle type: Rocket Rod XPR (Experimental Prototype Rocket)
- Riders per vehicle: 5
- Duration: 3:00
- Height restriction: 46 in (117 cm)
- Single rider line available
- Wheelchair accessible

Rocket Rods was a high-speed thrill attraction located in Tomorrowland at Disneyland, Anaheim, California. The ride was themed around a hypothetical “drag race” of the future, as well as a futuristic rapid transit system. The ride opened in May 1998, utilizing the existing PeopleMover track and infrastructure as part of the New Tomorrowland refurbishment project. The ride experienced frequent technical problems and was shut down indefinitely for renovations in September 2000; ultimately, the ride would not reopen, as confirmed via an official press release in April 2001, after two years of sporadic operations, and would officially remain closed. While Rocket Rods' queue was replaced with Buzz Lightyear Astro Blasters in 2005, the majority of the track infrastructure utilized by both the attraction and its predecessor still exist in Tomorrowland as of 2026.

== History ==
In the 1990s, Disneyland wanted to refurbish the Tomorrowland section as part of the "Disney Decade", started by Michael Eisner. This project was originally called Tomorrowland 2055. Mission to Mars was planned to be replaced by ExtraTERRORestrial Alien Encounter. Also proposed to join Tomorrowland 2055 was The Timekeeper, which was set to take over Circle-Vision 360°; another attraction, Plectu's Fantastic Intergalactic Revue, a musical stage show, was to take place where America Sings was previously located. These plans were cancelled following the underwhelming opening figures—and negative public reception—of Euro Disney (known today as Disneyland Paris). Instead of a complete overhaul, Tomorrowland instead saw some updates to a few of its attractions, and a golden-bronze color scheme was given to the once bright, all-white land. One of the attractions to be shuttered was the PeopleMover, which would close on August 21, 1995.

In early 1996, Disneyland announced that Tomorrowland would be remodeled with a variety of new attractions, including Honey, I Shrunk the Audience, Rocket Rods and Innoventions. Rocket Rods was set to be the area's star attraction. It would take over the former PeopleMover, with construction beginning in 1997.

Rocket Rods opened on May 22, 1998 as part of the New Tomorrowland. The high-speed attraction ran on a renovated PeopleMover track and riders entered the attraction through the former Circle-Vision 360° building at the front of Tomorrowland.

The ride was met with mixed reception from guests, as some enjoyed the thrilling acceleration and speed, but others felt it lacked the thrills of a true thrill ride while going too fast to be enjoyable for sightseeing. Rocket Rods was also operating sporadically due to frequent downtime and mechanical problems. Guests would have to wait in line for over three hours, as there were intermittent closures. Disney could not convince a corporate sponsor to provide funding for a big budget and entertaining pre-show. At that point, the company was still facing financial issues following the "disastrous" grand opening of Disneyland Paris in 1992. To save on costs, Disney chose not to modify the original PeopleMover track with banked turns, which would have aided in higher speeds being possible. Instead, the ride would accelerate on the straight sections of track and abruptly decelerate as the cars approached a tight, flat-grade turn. The original PeopleMover was able to traverse these turns smoothly as it did not travel more than seven miles per hour. However, the ride never performed to designed show standards, due to the decision to reuse the PeopleMover track with its unbanked turns. The vehicle's tires were worn down at a quick rate, resulting in damaged engines. The constant changes of speed in the ride often caused malfunctions. The track and internal structure of the attraction were damaged. In addition, the computer system would shut the attraction down if it was not in the correct position, leading to frequent downtime.

On July 6, 1998, a little over a month after its grand opening, Rocket Rods was closed for a refurbishment to address the issues. It was reported to remain closed for five weeks, but it ended up staying closed for three months before reopening in October 1998.

On August 29, 2000, Disneyland announced that Rocket Rods would close again on September 25 for a refurbishment that was to last until the spring of 2001, but no work was ever seen on the attraction. On April 27, 2001, the Los Angeles Times and The Orange County Register reported that Rocket Rods would never reopen.

The queue building is now used for Buzz Lightyear Astro Blasters. Most of the Rocket Rods vehicles were scrapped after the closure, but it is unknown exactly how many were kept. One vehicle was placed in front of the Hollywood & Dine restaurant at Disney California Adventure where it remained for a few months. It was gone by the spring of 2002. Another vehicle ended up in the collection of Richard Kraft, and was listed for auction in late August 2018.

== Experience ==
=== Queue ===
The queue for Rocket Rods was located in the former CircleVision 360° theater which housed America the Beautiful and Wonders of China. In the first room, large blueprints of old and current Tomorrowland attractions adorned the walls, along with former Tomorrowland attraction vehicles, which were repainted blue with an orange grid to mimic a blueprint appearance. Four PeopleMover cars, two rockets from Rocket Jets, a Space Mountain rocket, and the front of a Mark III Disneyland Monorail were included in the queue of the ride. Near the end of the room was a video screen that displayed Walt Disney animated segments from the 1950s to the 1970s, which featured Walt's ideas of future transportation. All of the segments featured what many consider far-fetched or nearly impossible concepts of future transportation systems, such as fully automated and auto-guided mobile homes and cars using anti-gravity or magnetic devices to scale walls and objects. Each segment concluded with a short narrated segment explaining how these technologies evolved into forms of technology used in 1998, or expected to be used in the future. The short narrations brought insight to the animated segments and explained to guests that "in the world of creativity there's no end to the possibilities" (the theme of the ride itself.)

The next room of the queue was the original nine-screen Circle-Vision 360° theater, where guests watched transportation videos, excerpts from the Circle-Vision 360° films "America the Beautiful" and "The Timekeeper" put between a Walt Disney narrated video, and a video depicting the evolution of General Motors cars. Guests then continued through the "transit tunnel" (formerly a backstage area) where guests passed "proposals" for extending the Rocket Rods system to the nearest commercial airport, John Wayne Airport and other nearby destinations. The Transit Tunnel led to a series of stairs that circled around the inside of the tower that held the Rocket Rods platform and the Observatron (the former location of the Rocket Jets attraction.) The stairs led guests to the elevated Rocket Rods station in the center of Tomorrowland.

In the queue area, near the stairway to the boarding area was a fictional map titled Rocket Rods Proposed System Expansion, showing guests where Rocket Rods was to expand in the future. The map was for fun, and had no actual locations on it (as well as ambiguous ones), including Tomorrowland attractions already bypassed by the Rocket Rods route, such as:

- Star Tours
- Space Mountain
- Innoventions
- Disney California Adventure
- Disneyland Resort Hotels
- Edison International Field
- Arrowhead Pond of Anaheim
- Walt Disney Studios, Burbank
- Los Angeles neighborhood Hollywood
- John Wayne Airport
- The beach
- The mountains

=== Ride ===
Guests boarded an unusual 5-seat Rocket Rod before moving forward to a staging area similar to one used for drag racing. In front of the riders were lights changing from red, to yellow, to green, a charging sound effect was heard and the vehicles would then zoom down a straightaway toward the entrance of Tomorrowland, before quickly decelerating at the curve in the track. When the attraction was first opened, the straightaway was used for a small wheelie as well. During the development phase, Disney was unable to obtain sponsors to aid in the funding of the attraction after Euro Disney's failure; thus, the turns were not banked, requiring sudden deceleration followed by acceleration. The ride traversed the building housing Star Tours. R2-D2's beeping noise could be heard as the ride zoomed through the queue line. Along with Star Tours, guests also went past the Star Trader gift shop and the Starcade, offering views of all three through glass panes in the tunnel. Segments of the tunnel were entirely opaque, and one turn used a mirror to create the effect of nearly colliding with another oncoming ride vehicle. Afterwards, the Rocket Rod took guests into Space Mountain, during which the riders could catch a brief glimpse of the ride. The vehicle then took riders outside again before entering the Carousel Theater, home of Innoventions. Due to the long, slightly curved nature of this stretch of track, the Rocket Rods were able to accelerate to a comparatively high speed here. After leaving the other side of Innoventions, another charging sound effect was heard and the vehicle took riders to the next area. Guests zoomed through a series of turns and dips above Autopia and the Submarine Voyage, which closed only a few months after the opening of Rocket Rods. A variety of street sounds could be heard in this portion, including cars and honking horns. Finally, the vehicle passed next to the Disneyland Monorail station before entering the Rocket Rods queue building, where a strobe light flashed and a blast of air shot out at the riders. The vehicle then traveled along the straightaway from the first leg of the ride back to the station.

Rocket Rods was the first Disneyland attraction to house a Single Rider line due to its long lines and limited capacity.

=== Music ===
The evolution of GM cars video featured an electronic version of the Steppenwolf hit "Born to Be Wild", arranged and recorded by former Oingo Boingo member Steve Bartek.

In addition to the re-arranged version of "Born to Be Wild," the attraction featured its own theme song: "World of Creativity (Magic Highways of Tomorrow)" also arranged and performed by Steve Bartek. The song, originally known as "Detroit" from the 1967 Disney film The Happiest Millionaire, was composed by Robert and Richard Sherman.

== Gallery ==
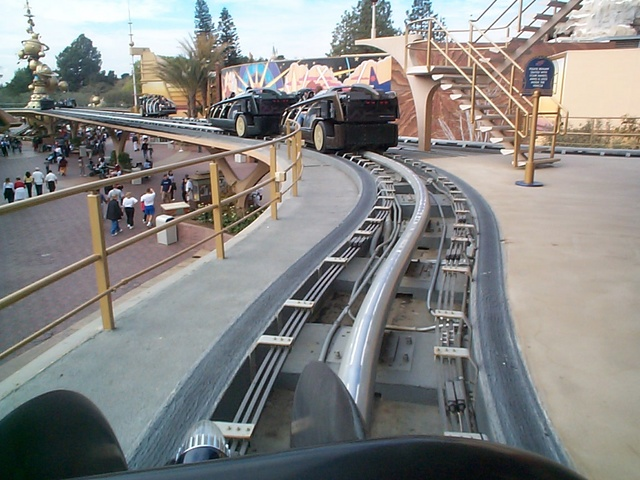
Rocket Rods leaving the loading platform. Vehicles paused before being flung down the track at high velocity and then slowing down to make the sharp corner toward the end.

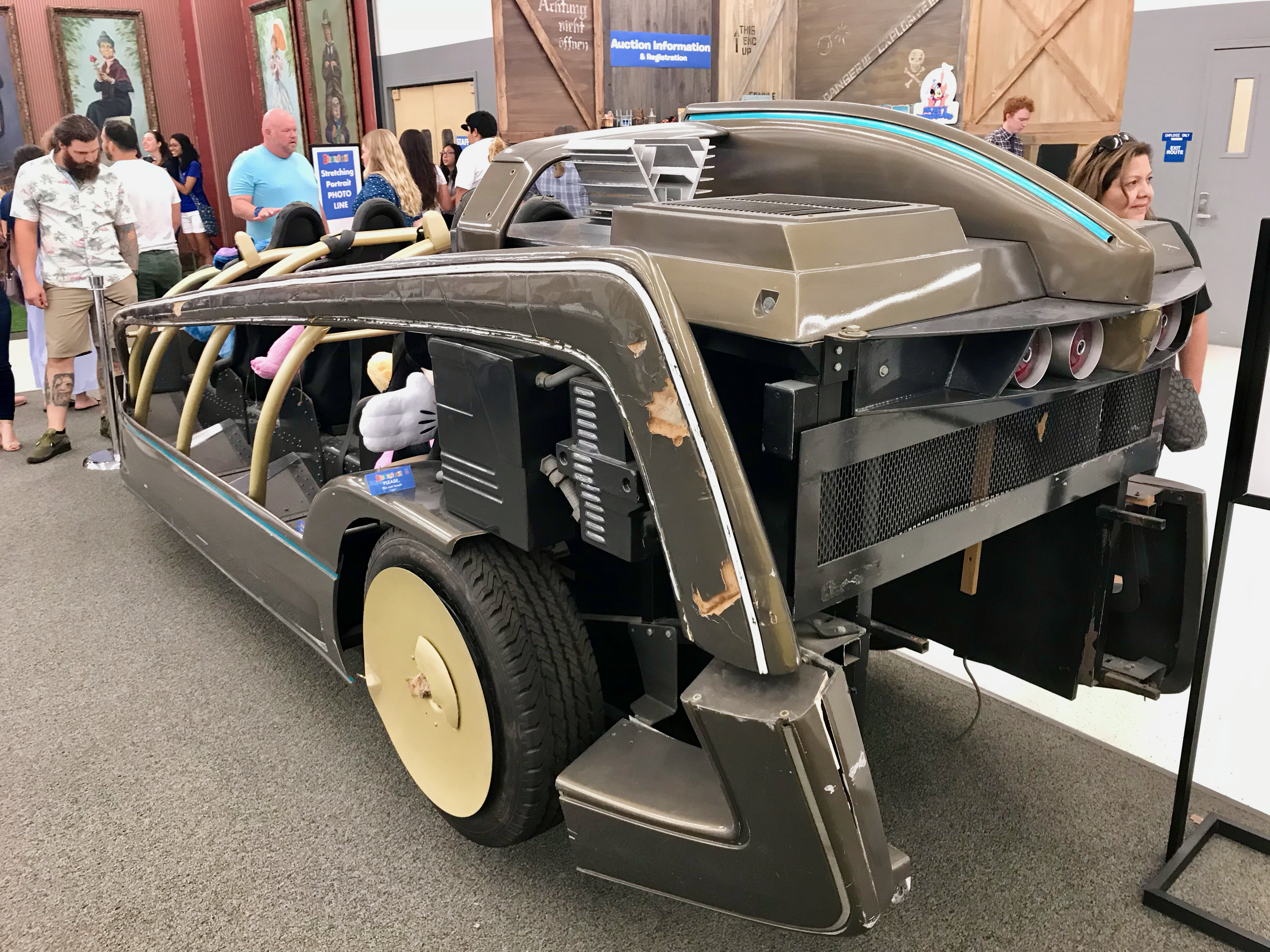
A derelict Rocket Rod on display at the That's from Disneyland! exhibit and auction in Sherman Oaks, California, in 2018
