= Meg Crofton =

American businesswoman

Meg G. Crofton
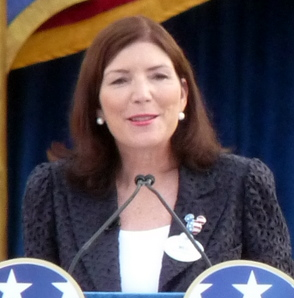
- Crofton at the Magic Kingdom in July 2009
- Born: 1953 (age 72–73); San Diego, California
- Education: Florida State University (B.A., M.B.A.)
- Occupations: President, Walt Disney Parks & Resorts Operations, U.S. and France
- Spouse: Rich Crofton

Meg Gilbert Crofton (born Mary Elizabeth Gilbert in 1953) is an American businesswoman, who served as president of Walt Disney Parks & Resorts in the United States and France. She was named to the position on August 7, 2006, replacing Al Weiss, who had been promoted to president of worldwide operations for Walt Disney Parks and Resorts in November 2005.

Crofton served as a member of the University of Central Florida Board of Trustees, after being appointed by the Florida Board of Governors for a five-year term in 2011. In 2008, The Orlando Sentinel named her among the top 25 most powerful people in Central Florida.

== Early life and education ==
Born in San Diego, California, Crofton moved to Florida with her family as a 6-year-old when her father, Charles "Chuck" Gilbert, was relocated there in his work with the aerospace services division of Pan American, a contractor to NASA. She attended Rollins College before transferring to Florida State University, where she earned a bachelor's degree in marketing and an MBA.

Married to Rich Crofton since 1981, she and her husband have lived in Winter Park, Florida.

== Career ==
Crofton joined Disney in 1977 as a marketing manager with Vista-United Telecommunications, a company subsidiary that provided telecommunication services to the Florida resort. After a brief period away from the organization, she re-joined Vista-United in 1981 as operations manager. In 1984, she became manager of The Golf Resort (later called The Disney Inn), a hotel that is now Shades of Green, a military resort operated by the U.S. Department of Defense at Walt Disney World Resort.

Crofton later became the resort's vice president of human resources and spent five years as senior vice president of human resources and organizational improvement. In 2002 she was promoted to executive vice president of human resources for Walt Disney Parks and Resorts, the division of The Walt Disney Company that operates its theme parks, resort hotels, cruise line and other vacation businesses worldwide.

Crofton was promoted to her last position, which includes oversight of Disneyland and Disneyland Paris, in wake of the retirement of Al Weiss, president of worldwide operations for all of Disney parks and resorts. She is getting part of his duties. Crofton's promotion was announced on July 5 by the Orlando Sentinel. Previously, she was the president of Walt Disney World. She was succeeded by George Kalogridis.

It was announced January 9, 2013, Crofton would be stepping down from her post to become president of Walt Disney Parks and Resorts Operations, U.S. and France.

On December 9, 2014, it was announced that Crofton would be retiring on June 1, 2015.
