= Al Weiss =

American businessman (born 1954)

Allen R. "Al" Weiss
- Born: 1954 (age 71–72); U.S.
- Education: BA, MBA
- Alma mater: Maynard Evans (Orlando, Florida), Valencia College, University of Central Florida, Rollins College.
- Occupations: President of Worldwide Operations, Walt Disney Parks and Resorts

Allen R. "Al" Weiss (born 1954) is an American businessman who served as President of Worldwide Operations for Disney Parks, Experiences and Products, a division of The Walt Disney Company.

== Career at The Walt Disney Company ==
Weiss began his Disney career as an 18-year-old Walt Disney World cast member in 1972. His first job was a "z-runner", a financial analyst who zeroed out cash registers at the end of shifts.

He received an associate degree from Valencia College, a bachelor's degree from the University of Central Florida in 1976, and an MBA from Rollins College in 1981.

After serving in multiple roles, Weiss was named president of the Walt Disney World Resort in Lake Buena Vista, Florida, starting in 1994 a role which he held until 2005. Meg Crofton succeeded Weiss as president of Walt Disney World Resort in 2006.

He was appointed President of Worldwide Operations, Disney Parks, Experiences and Products in November 2005. On June 22, 2011, Al Weiss announced his plans to retire from the Disney company effective November 1, 2011. This ended his 39-year career at The Walt Disney Company. In December 2011, he had a shop window dedicated with his name on Main Street U.S.A. in the Magic Kingdom at Walt Disney World.

== Florida and business interests ==
Weiss served as the 2004–2005 chairman of the Metro Orlando Economic Development Commission, and served as a trustee at both University of Central Florida and Stetson University.

He served on the founding Board of Directors for the Corporation for Travel Promotion starting in 2010, after it was created by the Travel Promotion Act of 2009.

In 2018, as Chairman & General Partner of Global Blockchain Ventures, he launched a $100 million fund to invest in blockchain technology.

== Personal life ==
He is divorced from his ex-wife, Doreen, who lives in Kissimmee, Florida, and is now married to Brea Barnes Weiss. They live in Windermere, Florida. He is also a co-founder of Vision360, an Orlando organization that builds multidenominational Christian churches.
