= America Sings =

Former animatronic attraction at Disneyland

Coordinates: 33°48′43″N 117°55′00″W

- The ride's soundtrack cover

Disneyland
- Area: Tomorrowland
- Status: Removed
- Opening date: June 29, 1974
- Closing date: April 10, 1988
- Replaced: Carousel of Progress
- Replaced by: Innoventions

Ride statistics
- Attraction type: Rotating Theater
- Designer: WED Enterprises
- Model: Carousel Theater
- Theme: American Musical History
- Music: Buddy Baker
- Hosted by: Sam (Burl Ives); Ollie (Sam Edwards)
- Additional Voices: Rex Allen; Sue Allen; Mic Bell; Ray Campi; Peggy Clark; Bill Cole; Mac Curtis; Jewel Hall; Geary Hanley; Bill Lee; Diana Lee; Ray McKinley; Gene Merlino; Tim Morgon; Lloyd Perryman; Cheryl Poole; Jean Ritchie; Scuffy Shew; Betty Taylor; Jerry Whitman; Chill Wills
- Audio-Animatronics: 115
- Sponsor: Del Monte

America Sings was an attraction at Disneyland in Anaheim, California, United States, from 1974 to 1988. It featured a cast of stylized Audio-Animatronics animals singing songs from various periods in the music history of the United States.

== History ==
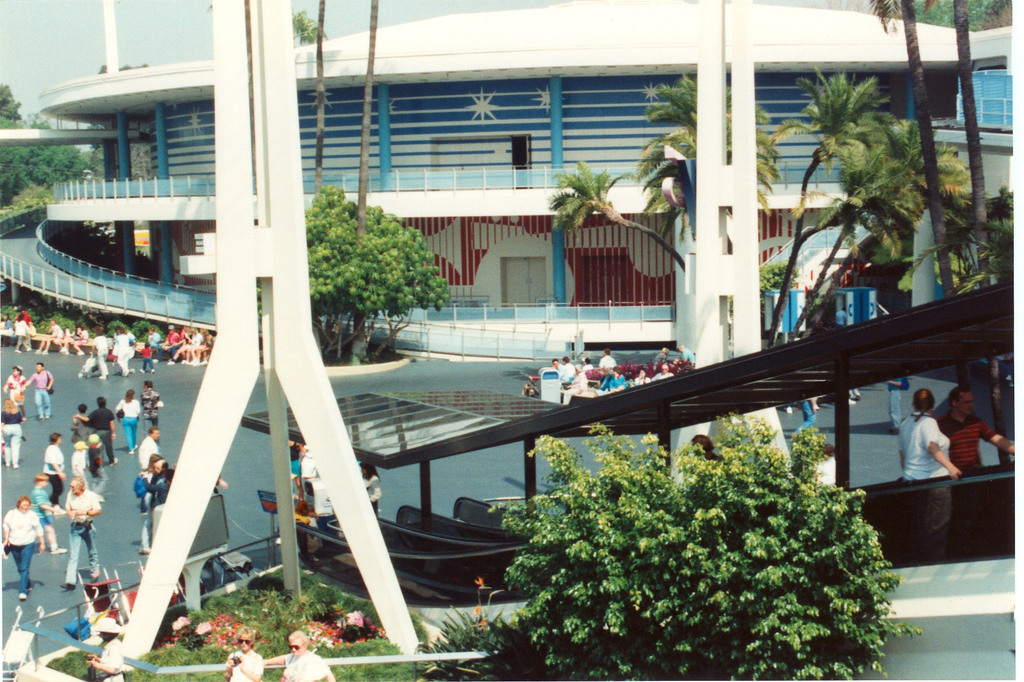
America Sings exterior

America Sings opened at Disneyland on June 29, 1974, replacing the General Electric-sponsored Tomorrowland attraction Carousel of Progress, which had moved to the Magic Kingdom at the Walt Disney World Resort in 1973. America Sings used the same Carousel Theater as its predecessor. The building had an outer ring of six theaters, connected by divider walls, that revolved mechanically about every four minutes around the six fixed stages in the center of the building.

Unlike Carousel of Progress, which rotated clockwise, America Sings rotated in a counterclockwise direction. Also, unlike Carousel of Progress, America Sings only used the lower level of the Carousel Theater. The upper level was eventually used to house the SuperSpeed Tunnel in 1977 (which later became themed to the Game Grid from the 1982 film Tron) that the PeopleMover transportation attraction passed through.

Written primarily by Marc Davis and Al Bertino, America Sings featured a singing cast of Audio-Animatronics animals. The show's Masters of Ceremonies were an American bald eagle named Sam (voiced by Burl Ives) and an owl named Ollie (voiced by Sam Edwards). All of the characters were designed by Davis. Sam is completely separate from the Sam the Olympic Eagle character designed a decade later by C. Robert Moore (also a Disney employee) for the 1984 Summer Olympics.

Like the Carousel of Progress, the first and the last scenes of America Sings involved the loading and unloading of guests, while the other four scenes, or "acts," depicted a particular era. However, the identical load and unload theaters each featured a small curtained gazebo with a backdrop showing a park. The curtains would open to reveal Sam and Ollie standing on a two-level podium, with Sam standing on the higher level, introducing or closing the show.

Between each act, as the theater rotated, the lights blacked out, and the theater illuminated with flashing stars; during the rotations, Sam sang about the next era the audience was about to enter, reprising the chorus of "Yankee Doodle".

Also, at some point in each act, the Weasel would suddenly appear on the scene and say, "Pop, Goes the Weasel!" for a total of five times. At the end of the show he said, "Goodbye, Goes the Weasel!"

The characters in America Sings were patterned after characters from the concept art for an animated movie called Chanticleer that Walt Disney cancelled in the 1960s.

=== Incident ===
On July 8, 1974, nine days after the attraction opened, an 18-year-old hostess named Deborah Gail Stone was accidentally crushed to death between two walls of the building at 10:37 p.m. A narrow channel that provided the show's movement between an inside stage stationary wall and the rotating wall was open and Stone either fell, stepped backwards, or attempted to jump from one stage to the other as the rotating wall began to move (it moved every 2 to 4 minutes, which was how long each act was). Her death was pronounced at 11:00 p.m., when the carousel was being reset for a new cycle. One of the audience members heard Stone's screams and notified park staff. Others thought it was a part of the show. By the time the audience member and the staff got to her, she had already died from her injuries. Stone's parents sued Disneyland for the death of their daughter, which resulted in a small settlement.

Following Stone's death, the attraction was closed down, remaining closed while Disney installed warning lights and had the area where the incident occurred cleaned. Later, the walls in the theater were remodeled so that they would break away in case a similar accident happened. The attraction reopened three days after the incident.

=== Closure ===
America Sings was created out of the company's desire to celebrate the United States Bicentennial. Once the Bicentennial was over, Disney's Imagineering team began developing new ideas for Tomorrowland that included a new show in the carousel theater. Separately, in the summer of 1983, the idea was conceived by Imagineer Tony Baxter for a log flume attraction for Disneyland that would become Splash Mountain, based on the animated sequences of Disney's 1946 film Song of the South. Knowing America Sings was eventually to close, the idea developed to move most of America Sings' Audio-Animatronics figures into Splash Mountain.

Two Audio-Animatronics geese were taken out of America Sings. Their outer "skin" was removed, leaving the robotic skeletons. Their heads were then replaced, and they were used as the G2 droids in the queue of Star Tours, which opened in January 1987. As a result, the geese quartets in Acts 1 and 2 became trios until America Sings closed on April 10, 1988.

Within days of the closure of America Sings, crews began to move most of the Audio-Animatronics figures to Splash Mountain, which opened in July 1989. After the closure of Splash Mountain in May 2023, many of the Audio-Animatronics figures were reportedly preserved by the Walt Disney Archives.

After America Sings' closure, the building's external appearance was unchanged, and the upper level continued to house the Tron tunnel for the PeopleMover until that attraction ceased to operate in 1995. A sign in front of the building read: "Sorry, we're closed to imagineer a brand new attraction" and it was closed to the public for nearly a decade.

From its closure until 1996, the inside of the lower level of the building was used for storage and office space, leaving remnants of sets and backdrops as well as the theater seats. America Sings was replaced in 1998 by Innoventions, a version of the Epcot attraction of the same name, as part of the Tomorrowland update of that year. The building was then redesigned and reopened in 2015 as the Tomorrowland Expo Center, hosting the Star Wars Launch Bay.

== Cast ==
- Burl Ives – Sam
- Sam Edwards – Ollie
- Rex Allen – "Sombrero" Dog
- Sue Allen – Collegiate Quartet Member
- Mic Bell – Alligator, Biker Bird, "Rattle and Roll" Frog, "Rattle and Roll" Stork
- Ray Campi – Swamp Boy
- Peggy Clark – Collegiate Quartet Member
- Bill Cole – Boothill Boy, Collegiate Quartet Member, Tenor Fox, Singing Goose
- Mac Curtis – Swamp Boy
- Jewel Hall – Biker Chick
- Geary Hanley – Swamp Boy
- Bill Lee – Boothill Boy, Collegiate Quartet Member, Singing Goose
- Diana Lee – "The Wandering Boy's" Mother
- Ray McKinley – Piano Pig
- Gene Merlino – Singing Goose
- Tim Morgan – Rock and Roll Stork
- Lloyd Perryman – "Home on the Range" Dog
- Cheryl Poole – Gilded Cage Chicken
- Jean Ritchie – Mother Opossum
- Scuffy Shew – Convict Fox
- Betty Taylor – Bill Bailey Pig
- Jerry Whitman – Blossom-Nose Murphy
- Chill Wills – Saddlesore Swanson

== Songs ==
Norman "Buddy" Baker arranged a selection of songs chosen to represent a panoramic view of American music.

=== Intro ===
- "Yankee Doodle" – Sam
- "Jeanie with the Light Brown Hair" – Sam
- "Pop Goes the Weasel" – Ollie and the weasel

=== Act 1 – The Deep South (1770s) ===
- "Dixie" / "L'il Liza Jane" / "Camptown Races" – The Dixie Quartet (later The Dixie Trio) geese quartet/trio
- "My Old Kentucky Home" – Colonel Houndstoothe (Bloodhound in rocking chair)
- "Polly Wolly Doodle" – The Swamp Boys (gator trio, frogs, and harmonica-playing raccoon)
- "Lord I Wish I Was A Single Girl Again" – Mother Possum with babies
- "Down in the Valley" – a Fox
- "Down by the Riverside" – Hens, Foxes, Swamp Boy Frogs

=== Act 2 – Headin' West (1850s) ===
- "Drill, Ye Tarriers, Drill" / "I've Been Working on the Railroad" / "Fireball Mail" – The Frontier Four (later The Frontier Three) geese quartet/trio, along with a non-singing rabbit and coyote
- "The Old Chisholm Trail" – Saddlesore Swanson (turkey)
- "Who Shot The Hole in My Sombrero?" – Sombrero-wearing dog
- "The End of Billy the Kid" – The Boothill Boys (vulture duo)
- "Home on the Range" – Tex Ranger (dog)

=== Act 3 – The Gay '90s ===
- "She May Be Somebody's Mother" / "The Bowery" / "After the Ball" – The Barber Shop Quartet (geese quartet)
- "Wanderin' Boy" – The Barber Shop Quartet & Mother Rabbit
- "(Won't You Come Home) Bill Bailey" – Showgirl Pig
- "Sweet Adeline" – Blossom-Nose Murphy (goose) & the Barber Shop Quartet
- "The Old Gray Mare" – The Old Gray Mare & the Barber Shop Quartet
- "A Bird in a Gilded Cage" – Bird in a Gilded Cage and Fox
- "Ta-ra-ra Boom-de-ay" – Bird in a Gilded Cage, Fox, Storks, Geese Quartets (male and female), Pig, Sam and Ollie

=== Act 4 – Modern Times (1950s, 1960s and 1970s) ===
- "Ja-Da" / "Darktown Strutters' Ball" / "Singin' in the Rain" – The Beep-Bop Boys (geese quartet)
- "A-Tisket, A-Tasket" / "Boo-Hoo" – College Quartet (male wolf, male fox and two female cats)
- "Beat Me Daddy, Eight to the Bar" – Piano Pig
- "Hound Dog" / "See You Later Alligator" – Rooster, Stork, Porcupine, Hound Dog, and Alligator
- "Shake, Rattle and Roll" – Rooster and Frog
- "Twistin' U.S.A." – Motorcycle storks
- "Joy to the World" – Modern Times cast (except Piano Pig and College Quartet)

=== Epilogue ===
- "Yankee Doodle" (reprise) – Sam
- "Auld Lang Syne" – Sam and Ollie
- Exit music: "Stars and Stripes Forever"
