= PeopleMover (Disneyland) =

Former attraction at Disneyland

- The PeopleMover Poster

Disneyland
- Area: Tomorrowland
- Coordinates: 33°48′44″N 117°55′03″W
- Status: Removed
- Opening date: July 2, 1967
- Closing date: August 21, 1995
- Replaced by: Rocket Rods

Ride statistics
- Attraction type: Transportation
- Manufacturer: Walt Disney Imagineering
- Designer: Walt Disney Imagineering
- Music: Capitol Media Music by Ole Georg (1976–1995)
- Speed: 7 mph (11 km/h)
- Vehicle type: Propulsion
- Vehicles: 62
- Riders per vehicle: 16
- Rows: 2 (Per Car)
- Riders per row: 2
- Duration: Approx 16:00 min
- Propulsion: Motorized wheels embedded in track
- Host: Jack Wagner (1974–1982); B.J. Ward (safety voice) (1982–1995)
- Sponsor: Goodyear Tire and Rubber Company (1967–1981)
- Wheelchair accessible
- Must transfer from wheelchair

The PeopleMover, sometimes referred to as the Goodyear PeopleMover and WEDWay PeopleMover, was a transport attraction that opened on July 2, 1967, in Tomorrowland at Disneyland Resort in Anaheim, California. Guests boarded small trains that ran on elevated tracks for a "grand circle tour" above Tomorrowland. The term people mover, now in wider use to describe many forms of automated public transport, was coined for this attraction. PeopleMover was originally only a working title, but became attached to the project over time. The attraction was initially seen as a serious prototype for intercity public transport. The ride closed on August 21, 1995, but its station and track infrastructure—which it shared with its short-lived successor, Rocket Rods—remain standing as of 2026. A second PeopleMover opened on July 1, 1975 in Tomorrowland at Magic Kingdom in Walt Disney World Resort in Bay Lake, Florida, near Orlando, Florida, and is still operating today.

== Operation ==
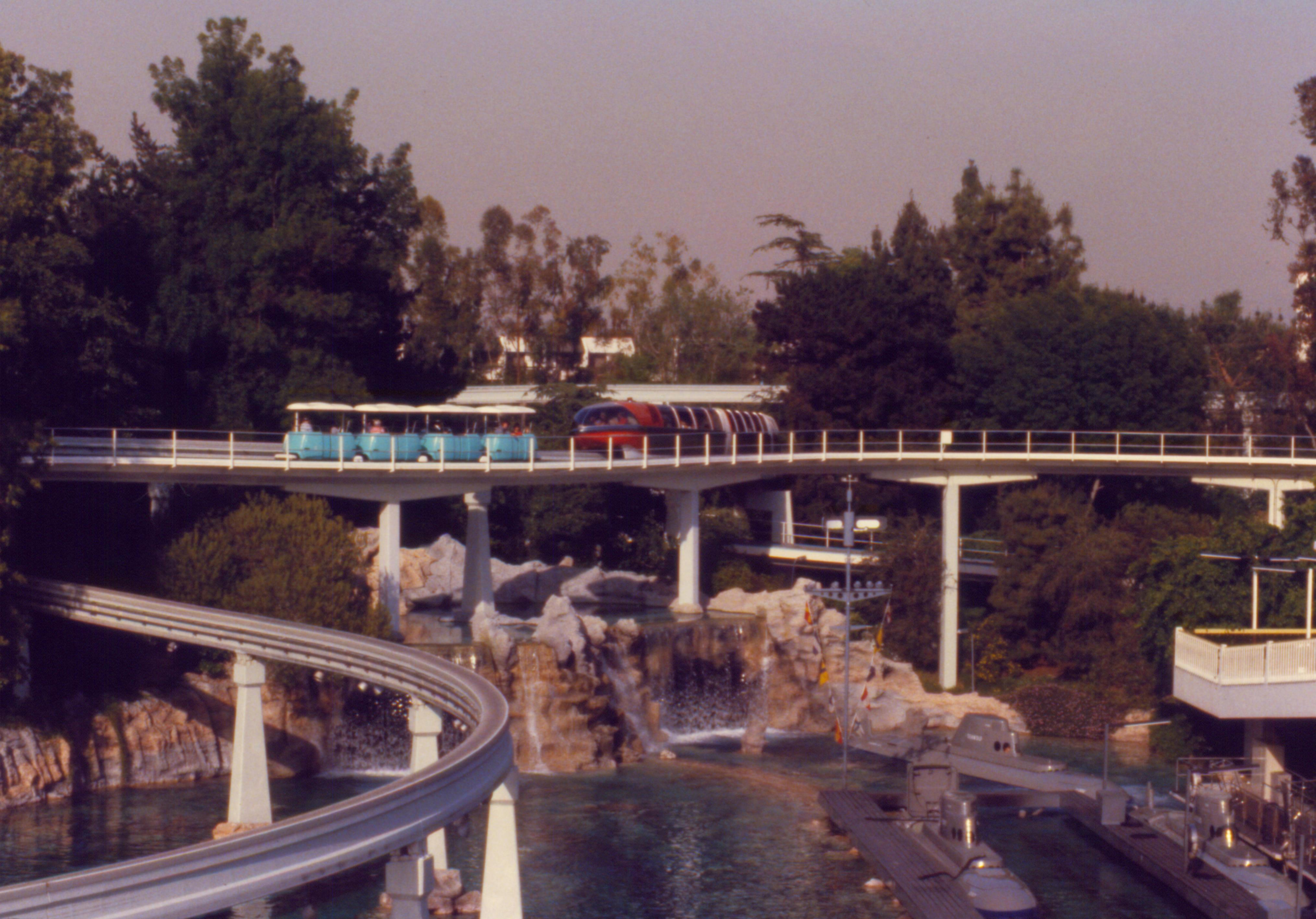
The PeopleMover (blue) and the Disneyland Monorail System (red) in 1979

The attraction ran on the WEDway system, and consisted of short trains of constantly-moving vehicles which were passively propelled by drive units in the track rather than motors within the vehicles themselves. The trains slowed down and rode bumper-to-bumper through the station, where passengers boarded and alighted by a large speed-matched rotating platform. There were 517 drive units embedded in the track, approximately one every 9 feet (2.7 m), ranging from 1/3 horsepower (1/4 kW) to 3 horsepower (2.2 kW) and geared to move the cars at 3.5 to 10 feet per second (1.1 to 3.0 m/s).

The ride had 55 trains and a capacity of between 4,600-4,885 passengers per hour. Each car included its own sound system which broadcast a continuous audio commentary and soundtrack, relative to the train's location. The commentary pointed out Disneyland's attractions along the way as well as announcing promotional items.

The tour departed from an elevated circular station in the center of Tomorrowland. From there, it traveled through most of Tomorrowland's buildings, offering previews of the attractions inside. In the attraction's opening year, the route passed through the queue of Adventure Thru Inner Space, into the Character Shop, then above the Tomorrowland Stage and entrance of Flight to the Moon. It then entered the upper level of the Carousel Theater, which housed the Carousel of Progress. From this level, passengers had a panoramic view of Progress City, a massive 115-foot diameter model of Walt Disney's original concept for the Experimental Prototype Community of Tomorrow (EPCOT), which served as the Carousel of Progress' post-show exhibit. After leaving the Carousel Theater, the route continued outdoors above the Tomorrowland and Fantasyland Autopias, Submarine Voyage, and Motor Boat Cruise. It then ran parallel to the Disneyland-ALWEG Monorail station before entering the Circle-Vision 360° theater of America the Beautiful, before returning back down Tomorrowland's main avenue to the station.

The attraction's onboard soundtrack originally consisted of the Goodyear jingle "Go, Go, Goodyear" and George Bruns' instrumentals "Nation on Wheels" and "The Monorail Song". From 1976 until its closure, the attraction's onboard soundtrack consisted of instrumental pieces composed by Danish composer Ole Georg for Capitol Records' production music library, Capitol Media Music.

=== Sponsorship ===
As the attraction was based in part on the Ford Magic Skyway from the 1964–65 New York World's Fair, Disney asked the Ford Motor Company to continue sponsorship by sponsoring Disneyland's new PeopleMover. They declined, because Ford was reluctant to support technology that appeared to replace the automobile, so Goodyear was then approached to sponsor it, and accepted. The wheels used in the WEDway system were replaced by Goodyear's tires. The PeopleMover's logo was then fashioned after Goodyear's logo, sharing a similar typeface. Goodyear sponsored the PeopleMover from its opening until December 31, 1981. However, Goodyear's instrumental "Go Go Goodyear" advertising jingle still served as part of the attraction's soundtrack until at least 1990.

== History ==
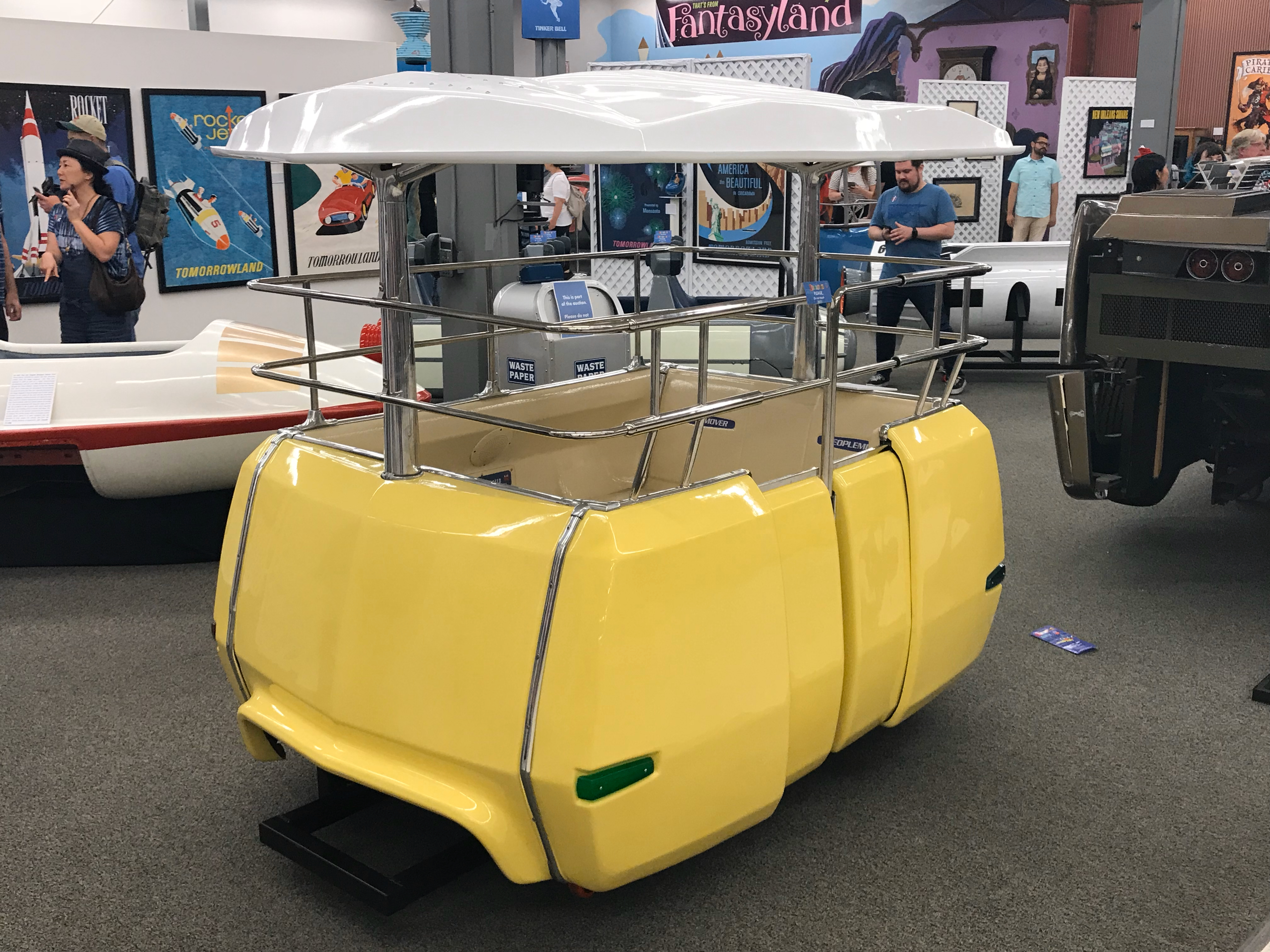
A restored PeopleMover car on display in 2018.

The attraction was developed around the WEDway system that debuted on the Ford Magic Skyway attraction at the 1964–65 New York World's Fair, but was updated to use rotary induction motors instead of rotary synchronous motors. It opened as part of New Tomorrowland in 1967, originally featuring four-car trains colored in either red, blue, yellow or green with white roofs. They were repainted all white with colored stripes in 1987-88, similar to the new Mark V Monorails that began operation around the same time. In 1968, each of the 62 trains were retrofitted with safety rails for each car, to deter guests from climbing out. In 1985, these safety rails were modified to completely wrap around each car, making it even more difficult for possible accidents to occur.

=== Later additions (1977–1995) ===
==== Space Mountain complex (1977) ====
The PeopleMover was temporarily closed on January 5, 1976, to accommodate construction of the Space Mountain complex, through which the PeopleMover track was extended. The attraction reopened on May 27, 1977, providing views of the new attraction's interior, as well as the upper level of the Starcade, a massive new video arcade in the Space Mountain complex.

The attraction's route through the upper level of the Carousel Theater was also altered. In 1973, the Carousel of Progress was closed at Disneyland, and moved to Walt Disney World's Magic Kingdom, where it reopened in 1975. Its post-show exhibit, the Progress City model, was also dismantled, and a portion of the model was incorporated into the Magic Kingdom's WEDway PeopleMover.

The former Progress City sequence was replaced by the SuperSpeed Tunnel, a special effects sequence in which footage of race cars were projected onto surrounding screens to simulate the effect of speed. In 1982, the projections were changed to feature scenes of the Light Cycle race from the newly-released film Tron. After this addition, the attraction's entrance signage was updated, promoting the attraction as PeopleMover Thru the World of Tron.

==== Star Tours (1987) ====
In 1985, Adventure Thru Inner Space closed permanently. In 1987, it was replaced by Star Tours, a motion simulator attraction based on the Star Wars franchise. Star Tours' queue featured an elaborate pre-show themed to an interplanetary spaceport, with Audio-Animatronic versions of C-3PO and R2-D2 working as employees of the fictional Star Tours travel agency. As Star Tours retained the existing queue layout as its predecessor, the PeopleMover passed directly through the new attraction's pre-show. Accordingly, new narration was recorded for the PeopleMover, with C-3PO welcoming passengers to the Star Tours spaceport.

After passing through the Star Tours pre-show, PeopleMover passengers encountered an Imperial Stormtrooper as the tour progressed into the Star Trader shop, before continuing on through the Starcade and Space Mountain.

Also in 1987, the vehicles were repainted all white with colored stripes, similar to the new Mark V monorail trains that began operation around the same time.

=== Closure ===
The PeopleMover closed on August 21, 1995. When Toy Story Funhouse operated as a temporary attraction during the 1996 season, a few character statues from the film sat on the PeopleMover track. It was replaced by the short-lived Rocket Rods in 1998. Due to the failure of Euro Disney, officials kept the PeopleMover track unbanked and original.

A few of the retired PeopleMover cars were used in other parts of the resort after its closing. Three cars from train #45 used to sit outside the Team Disney Anaheim building, but they were removed in 2007. One of the cars from train #45 is now in display at the cast members cafe called the Eat Ticket. Another car from train #45 is now owned by a local resident. Two cars were repainted with a blue and orange grid to resemble a blueprint (along with Rocket Jets vehicles and the front of a Mark III Disneyland-ALWEG monorail train) and placed in the queue display for Rocket Rods, which would later close in 2000. These were later sold on Disney Auctions after Rocket Rods closed.

The checkout counters at the Little Green Men Store Command in Tomorrowland are modified from PeopleMover cars and the store has former Rocket Jets vehicles retrofitted as merchandise shelves. The store also had Skyway buckets hanging from the ceiling when it was the Premiere Shop.

In 2000, almost five years after the attraction's closure, an updated version of the Autopia attraction opened. The old on-board audio music from the PeopleMover served as the background area music in Autopia's queue from 2000 to 2017.

The ride track infrastructure, as well as the loading station, which served both the PeopleMover and Rocket Rods still stands unused in Tomorrowland as of 2026. Portions of the track, however, are still being maintained, as it was repainted in 2005 along with the rest of Tomorrowland, and foliage over the Autopia area was trimmed away or removed from the track. In September 2010 at D23's "Destination D" event, then-president of Disneyland Resort George Kalogridis said that while there may be plans to bring back the ride, the park would not be able to return the attraction to its original form due to stricter regulations. Kalogridis stated "Everyone understands the passion everyone has for it." He additionally stated, "Hang in there."

On August 15, 2026, Disney Experiences chairman Thomas Mazloum announced a "reimagining" of Tomorrowland at the Horizons: A Carousel of Progress Disney Experiences showcase at the company's biannual D23 convention at the Honda Center in Anaheim, California. The announcement, which marks Tomorrowland's first major renovation since 1998, has prompted renewed speculation about the future of the remaining PeopleMover infrastructure and renewed calls from fans for its potential revival. Disney has yet to confirm any specific details of the reimagining.

=== Deaths and incidents ===
In August 1967, a 16-year-old boy from Hawthorne, California, was killed while jumping between two moving PeopleMover cars as the ride was passing through a tunnel. He stumbled and fell onto the track, where an oncoming train of cars crushed him beneath its wheels and dragged his body a few hundred feet before it was stopped by a ride operator. The attraction had only been open for one month at the time.

In 1972, four teenage girls were riding the PeopleMover when one teenager lost her mouse ears cap. She and her cousin jumped onto the track to retrieve them. Realizing they'd have to get on a different PeopleMover car, the first girl successfully got into a car, while the second girl ran through a tunnel and out the exit and then fell into a guard rail and onto the concrete 30 feet below. She broke an arm, hip, and pelvis; she had to be in a body brace and have a pin inserted into her leg. She sued Disney for not having any warnings about the exit.

On June 7, 1980, an 18-year-old male was crushed and killed by the PeopleMover while jumping between moving cars. The accident occurred as the ride entered the SuperSpeed tunnel.

== Popular culture references ==
- A homage to the PeopleMover appears in the 2008 Disney·Pixar film WALL-E, depicting a transportation system with the name "PEOPLEMOVER" and the ride's signature circular boarding station.
- The box and poster art for Mega64's Version 3 DVD parodies the poster designs of the PeopleMover and Matterhorn Bobsleds, as well as Walt Disney's Disneyland opening day speech.
- In the 2010 video game Disney Epic Mickey, the PeopleMover is featured in Tomorrow City, a dystopian version of Tomorrowland.
- George Bruns' instrumental "Nation on Wheels" is featured in the 2025 Marvel Studios film The Fantastic Four: First Steps during a montage sequence.

== See also ==
- List of former Disneyland attractions
- Omnimover, a ride system named after the PeopleMover, developed by Bob Gurr and used in later Disney attractions
- Rail transport in Walt Disney Parks and Resorts
- Subway (George Bush Intercontinental Airport), a people mover at George Bush Intercontinental Airport, built by WED Enterprises
