= Innoventions (Disneyland) =

Former exhibition at Disneyland

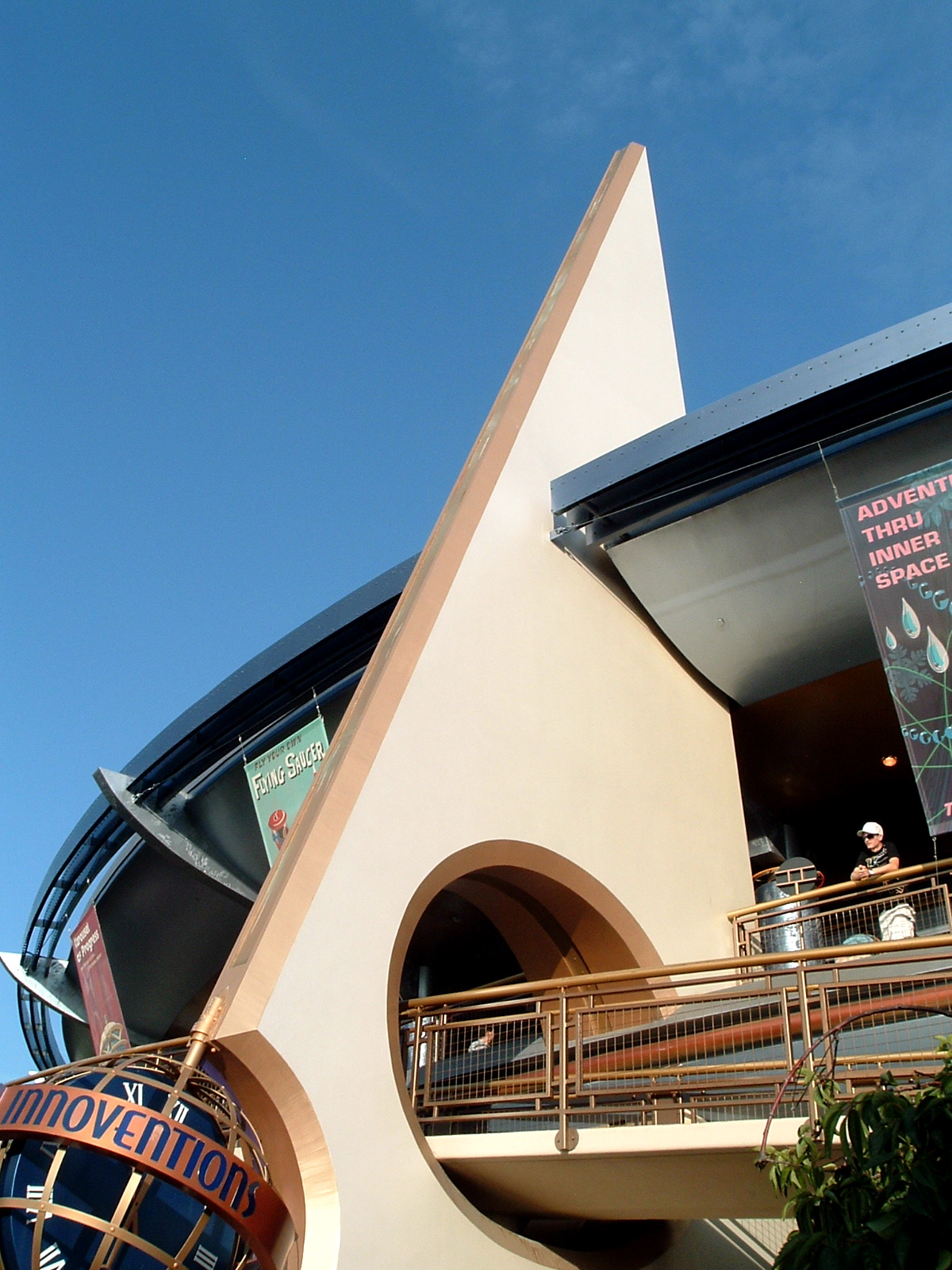
- Entrance to Innoventions before closure

Disneyland
- Area: Tomorrowland
- Coordinates: 33.812°N 117.9165°W
- Status: Removed
- Soft opening date: July 3, 1998
- Opening date: November 10, 1998
- Closing date: March 31, 2015
- Replaced: America Sings
- Replaced by: Tomorrowland Expo Center

Ride statistics
- Attraction type: Interactive exhibits
- Designer: Walt Disney Imagineering
- Music: "There's a Bright New World of Innoventions" written by the Sherman Brothers (music & lyrics)
- Host: Tom Morrow (voiced by Nathan Lane; 1998–2012)
- Wheelchair accessible
- Assistive listening available
- Closed captioning available

Innoventions was a two-story exhibit in Tomorrowland at Disneyland in Anaheim, California. Opening on July 3, 1998 as part of the New Tomorrowland, it featured rotating exhibits focusing on near-futuristic technologies. The attraction operated for nearly 17 years, closing on March 31, 2015. It occupied the Carousel Theater, a round two-story building in which the outer half of the first floor rotates. A similar attraction of the same name existed in Epcot at the Walt Disney World Resort until 2019.

== History ==
From 1967 to 1973, the building housed Walt Disney's Carousel of Progress. This attraction was moved from Disneyland to its current location in Magic Kingdom at the Walt Disney World Resort in 1973, at the request of its sponsor, General Electric. America Sings occupied the building from the following year until 1988. Audio-Animatronics from the show were used in Disneyland's Splash Mountain. The upper level of the building continued to house the Tron SuperSpeed Tunnel segment of the PeopleMover until that attraction eventually closed in 1995. The attraction used the same rotation mechanism built in 1967 for the Carousel of Progress. In the attraction’s early years, the outer portion of the first floor would stop rotating during the evening, but in later years, it stopped rotating altogether and guests enter on the second floor. The attraction closed on March 31, 2015.

== Attraction layout ==
The first floor hosted the Dream Home in alliance with Microsoft, HP, and Taylor Morrison. Keeping with Walt Disney's vision of bringing cutting-edge, inspiring ideas to Tomorrowland, the Innoventions Dream Home introduced Disneyland guests to then-newly available technology from the participating companies that would enhance their lives, while providing them a glimpse of the emerging digital advances they may find in their homes in the future. The attraction provided guests with a "high-tech, high-touch" opportunity to experience technology in an entertaining, low-risk environment showing them how the power of technology could connect them to the people and things they care most about.

Guests who entered the Innoventions building were greeted by Tom Morrow, an Audio-Animatronic voiced by Nathan Lane, who was the fictional mayor of Tomorrowland. He explained Innoventions in a comedic style and performed an updated version of the Sherman Brothers song "There's a Great Big Beautiful Tomorrow" from the original Carousel of Progress. In 2012, the Tom Morrow Audio-Animatronic was removed from display and was no longer part of the attraction. From 2013 until its closure, its focus mainly shifted to character meet-and-greets featuring superheroes from the Marvel Cinematic Universe.

== Replacement ==
The building was redesigned and reopened on November 16, 2015 as the Tomorrowland Expo Center. The first floor of the building hosts Star Wars Launch Bay, a Star Wars exhibit featuring peeks behind the scenes and character meet and greets with Darth Vader, Kylo Ren, Boba Fett, and Chewbacca. Star Wars Launch Bay was closed on March 13, 2020 as a result of the COVID-19 pandemic; it reopened sometime prior to May 2025. The second floor hosted Super Hero HQ, featuring meet and greets with Marvel characters Captain America, Thor, and Spider-Man and The Iron Man Experience exhibit, featuring Iron Man's suits based on the film. Super Hero HQ closed on April 2, 2016.

== Former exhibits and sponsors ==
- 1998–2000: Honeywell–sponsored playground
- 1998–2000: Silicon Graphics-sponsored A Bug's Life exhibit
- 1998–2004: General Motors simulator attraction
- 1998–2007: Hewlett Packard–sponsored computer game arcade
- 2000–2007: AT&T–Hyperlink Hopscotch
- 2000–2007: Pioneer Virtual Resort
- 2000–2013: St. Joseph Hospital's Healthy University, promoting healthy living.
- 2004–2005, 2007–2008: Segway track, where guests could ride a Segway
- 2005–2007: VMK Central
- 2005–2009: Talk to Stitch, an interactive experience in which guests could talk to Stitch from Disney's Lilo & Stitch using technology similar to Turtle Talk with Crush
- 2005–2015: Honda ASIMO theater, a 15-minute presentation on the state-of-the-art ASIMO robot
- 2007–2015: Siemens AG Project Tomorrow, featuring some of the same games as its counterpart at Spaceship Earth. During its run, Project Tomorrow featured:
  - Power City, a large digital "shuffleboard-style" game
  - Body Builder, a 3-D game allowing guests to build a digital human body, featuring the voice of Wallace Shawn as Dr. Bones.
  - Super Driver, a driving simulation video game featuring vehicle accident and avoidance systems.
  - A large glass globe with digitally projected images coming from within it. Below it were consoles that took photographs of guests, asked a series of questions about each guest, and superimposed the automatically cropped images of their faces onto an animated vision of the future.
- 2008–2011: The Neighborhood at Innoventions; guests watched and sometimes participated in live shows about Taylor Morrison homes, Yamaha musical instruments, ABC multi-format programming, Honda, or Southern California Edison.
- 2008–2015: Taylor Morrison / Microsoft Innoventions Dream Home (sponsored by HP, Microsoft, and Taylor Morrison), a house filled with the latest technology that was either on the market or soon to be available, including:
  - Microsoft Surface tables connected in a single dining room table
  - A 100-inch, 1080p rear-projector screen
  - Control4 panels in every room connecting to photo frames, lights, window shades, and speakers
  - A "Magic Mirror" that placed virtual three-dimensional pieces of clothing on a body-mapped subject
  - A bedroom that came to life with the story of Peter Pan
  - A kitchen featuring a countertop voice-activated cookbook, an internet-connected bulletin board, and Siemens appliances
  - Michael Jackson: The Experience and video games in the party tent
- 2013–2016: Thor: Treasures of Asgard, a promotional exhibit to commemorate the release of Marvel's Thor: The Dark World.
- 2013–2016: Iron Man Tech Presented by Stark Industries, a promotional exhibit to commentate the release of Marvel's Iron Man 3. Paul Bettany provides the voice of J.A.R.V.I.S.
- 2014–2015: Captain America: The Living Legend and Symbol of Courage, a promotional exhibit to commemorate the release of Marvel's Captain America: The Winter Soldier.

== Gallery ==
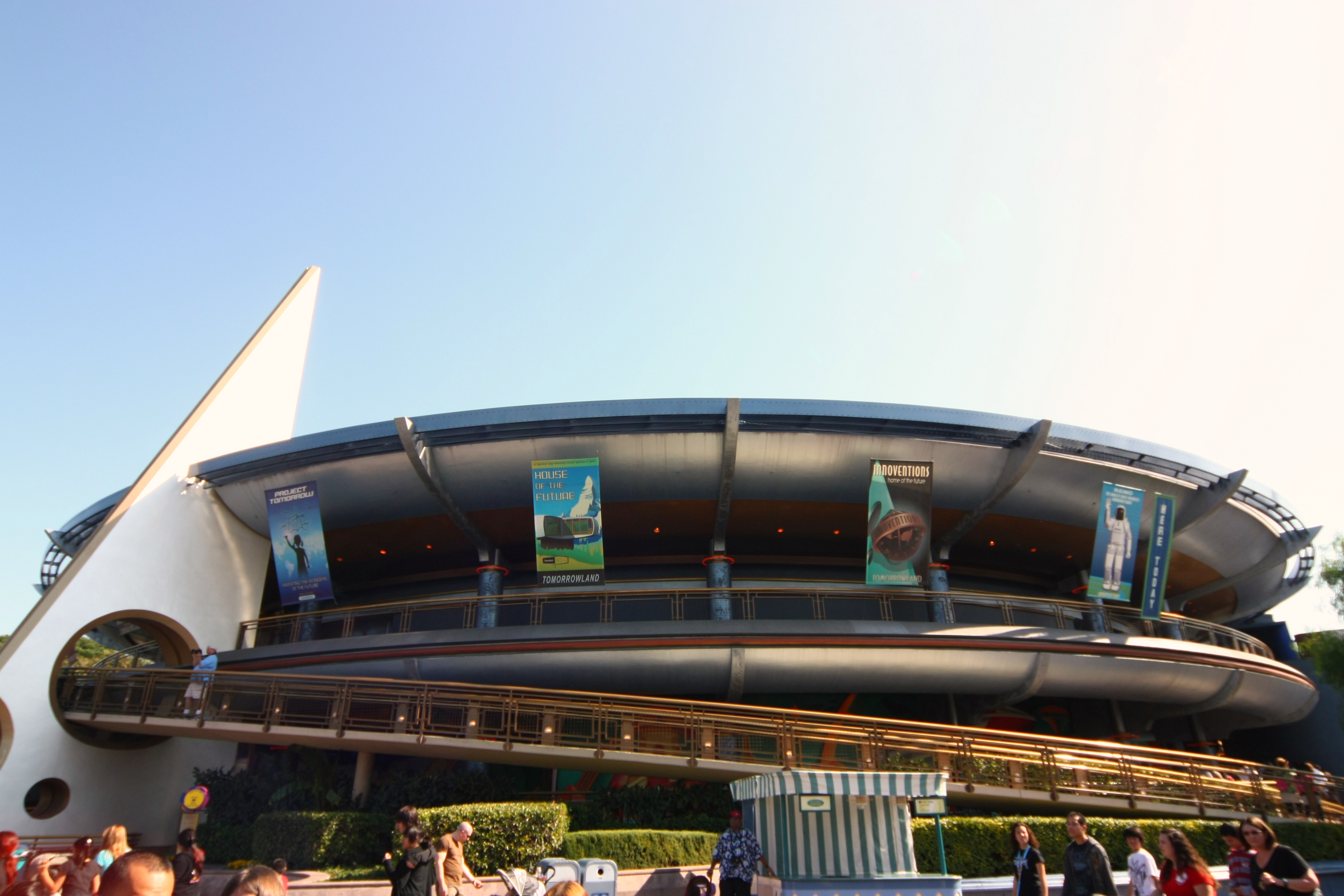
Innoventions

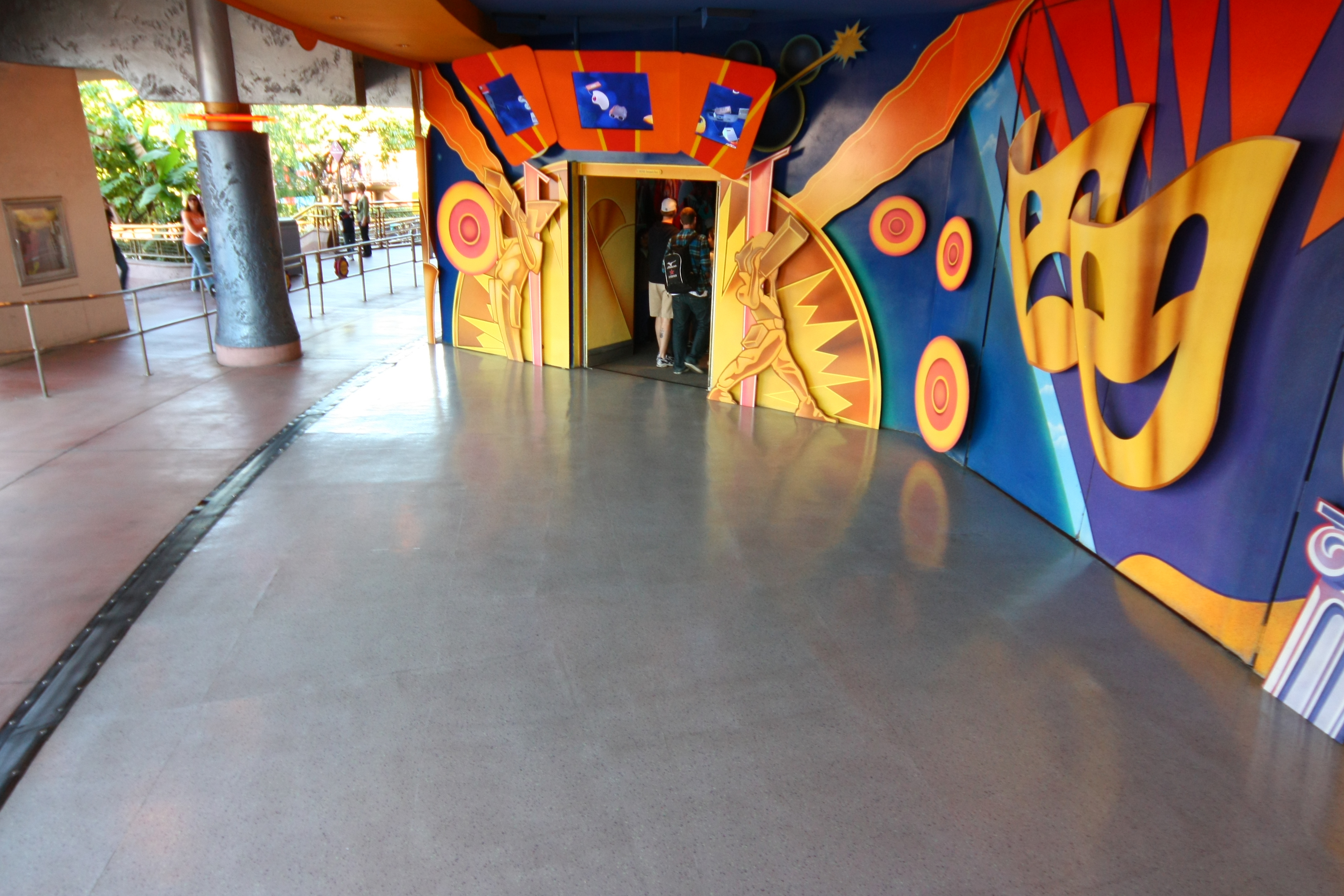
Queuing area

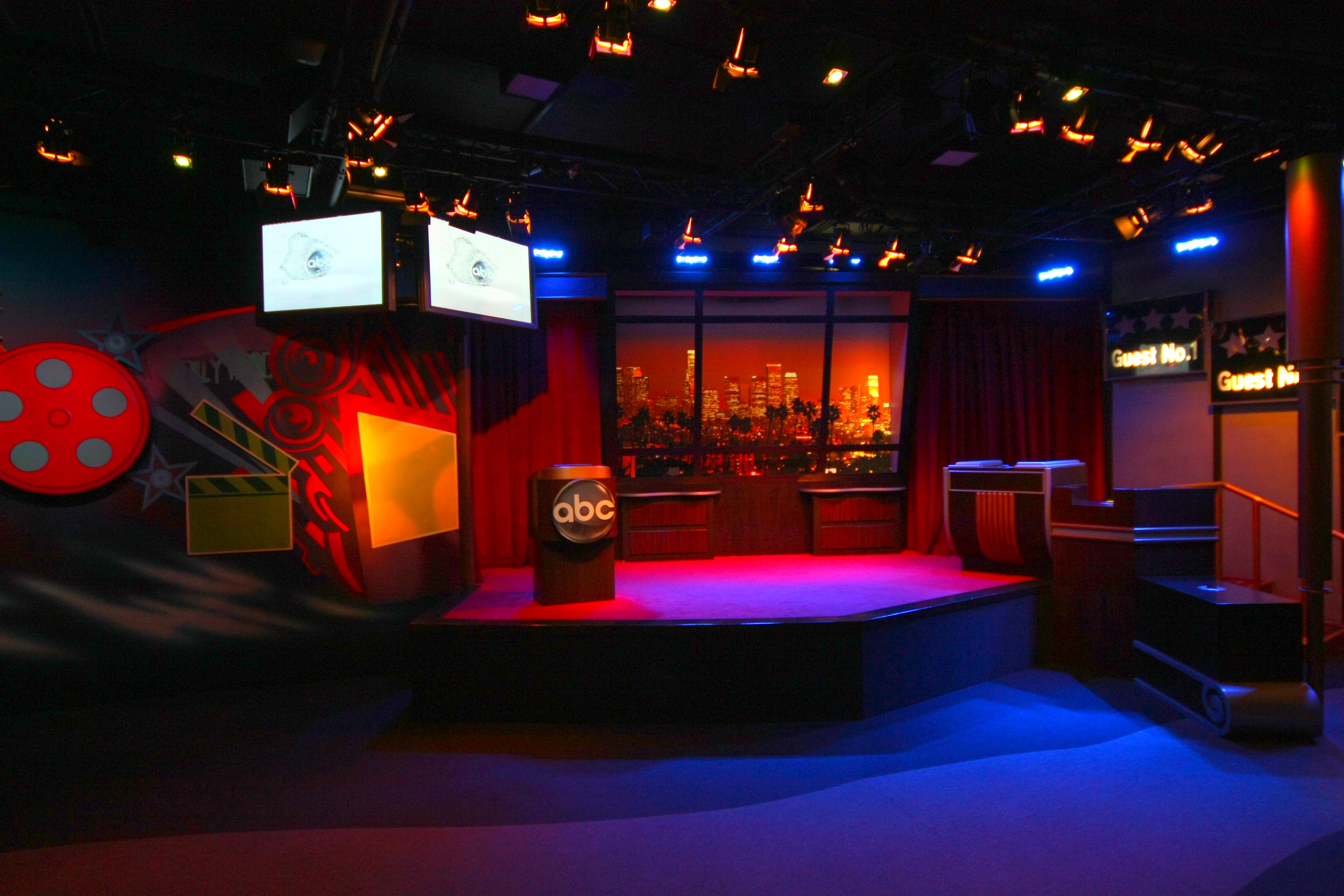
Pre-show area

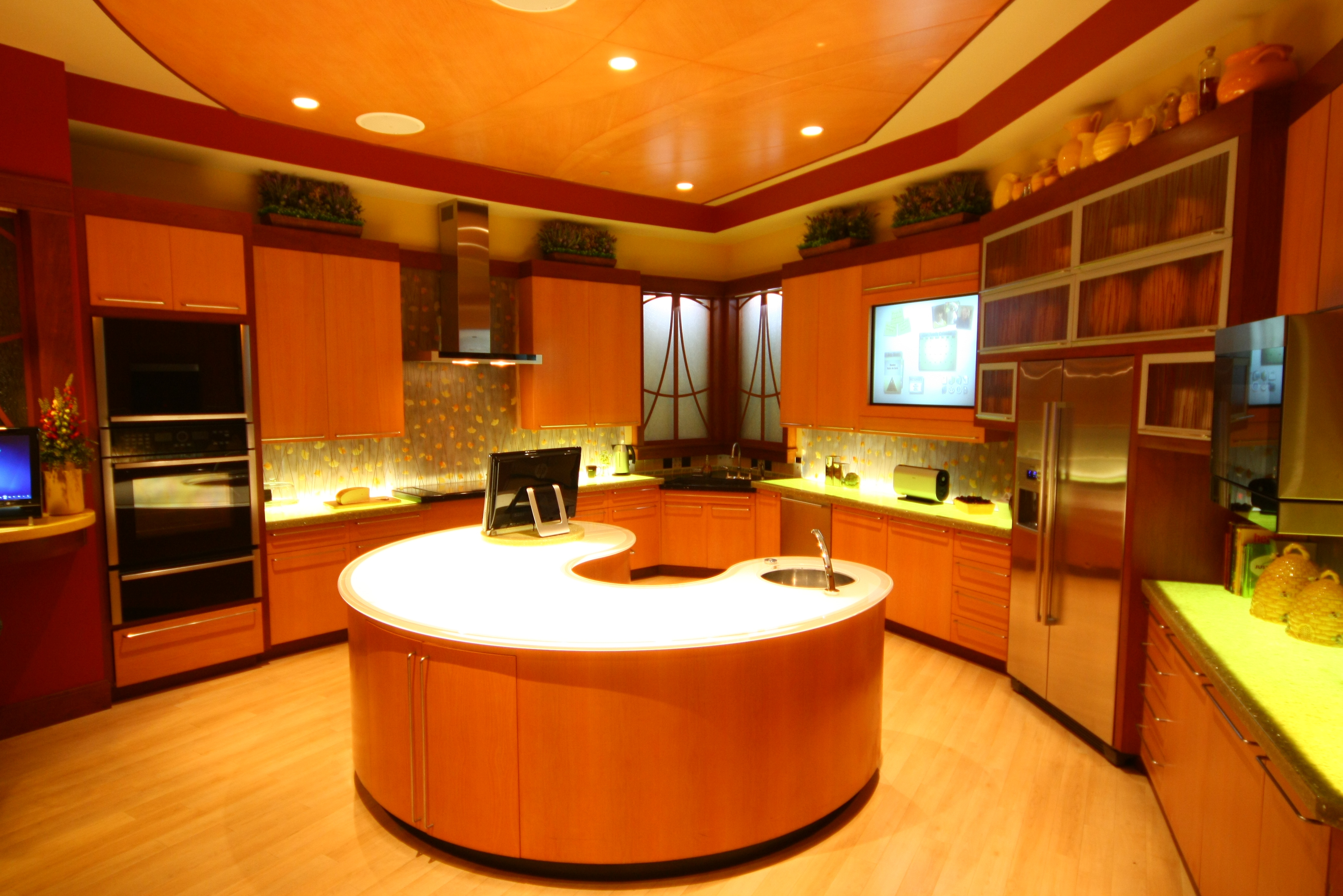
Kitchen of Tomorrow

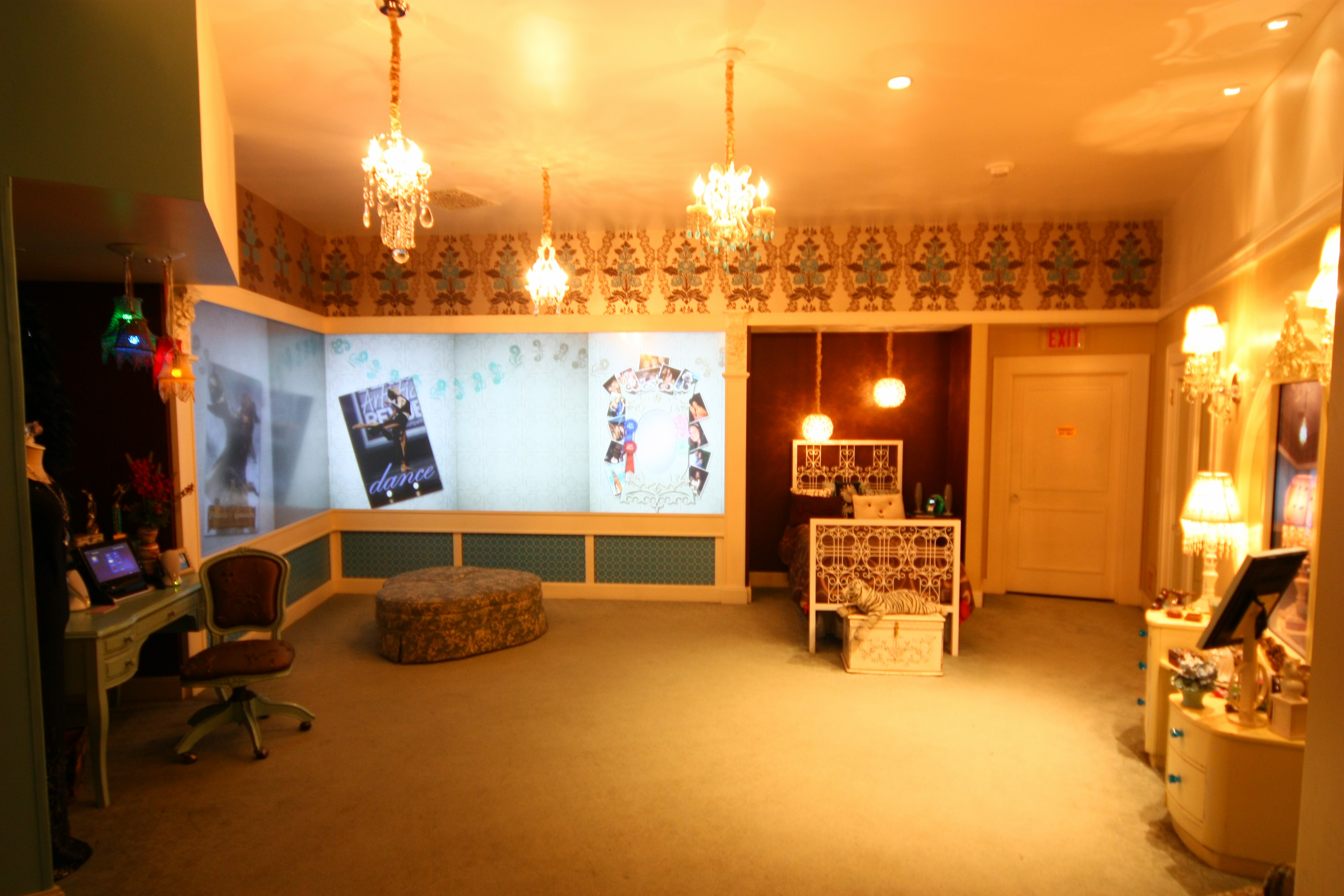
One of the bedrooms

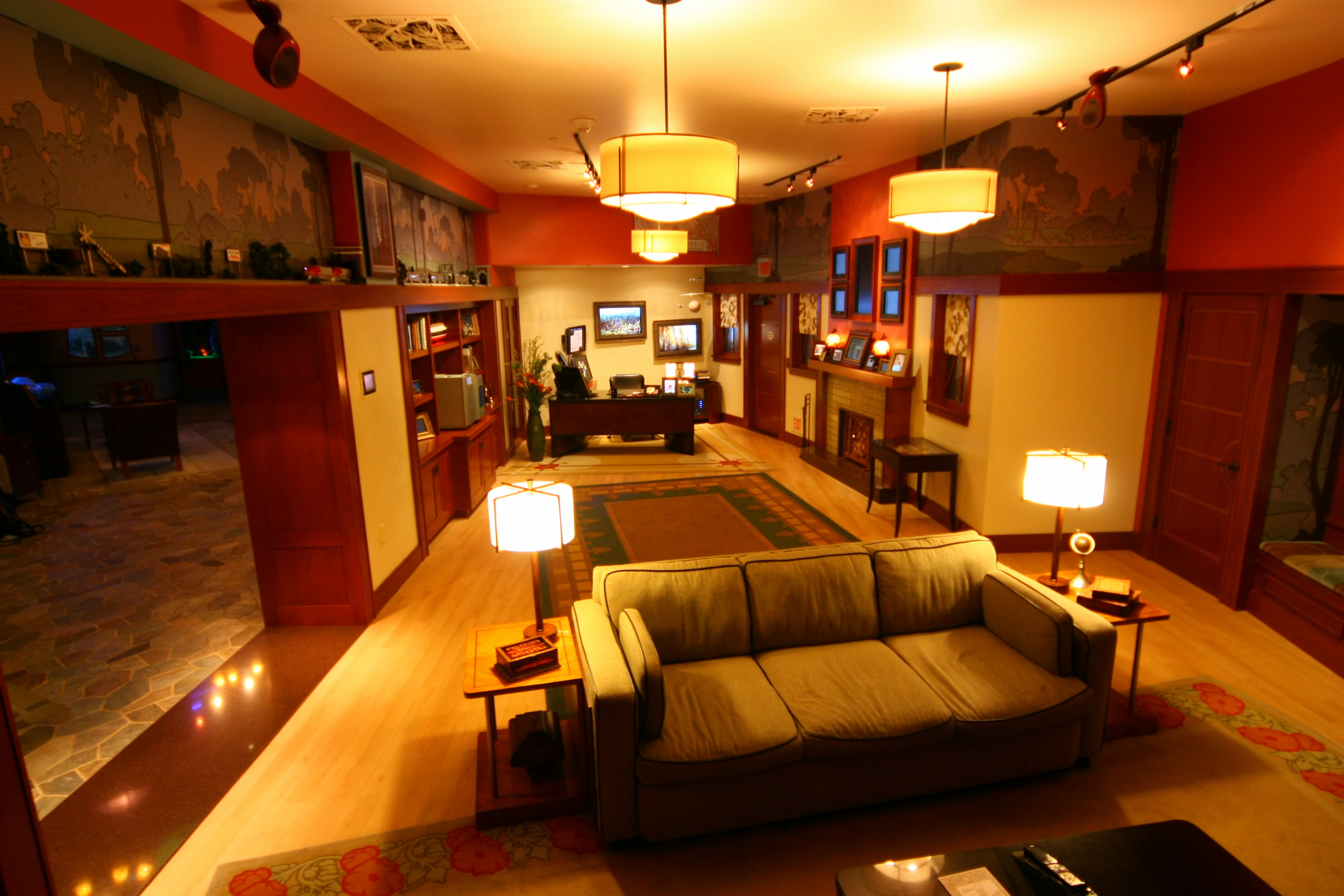
Office of Tomorrow

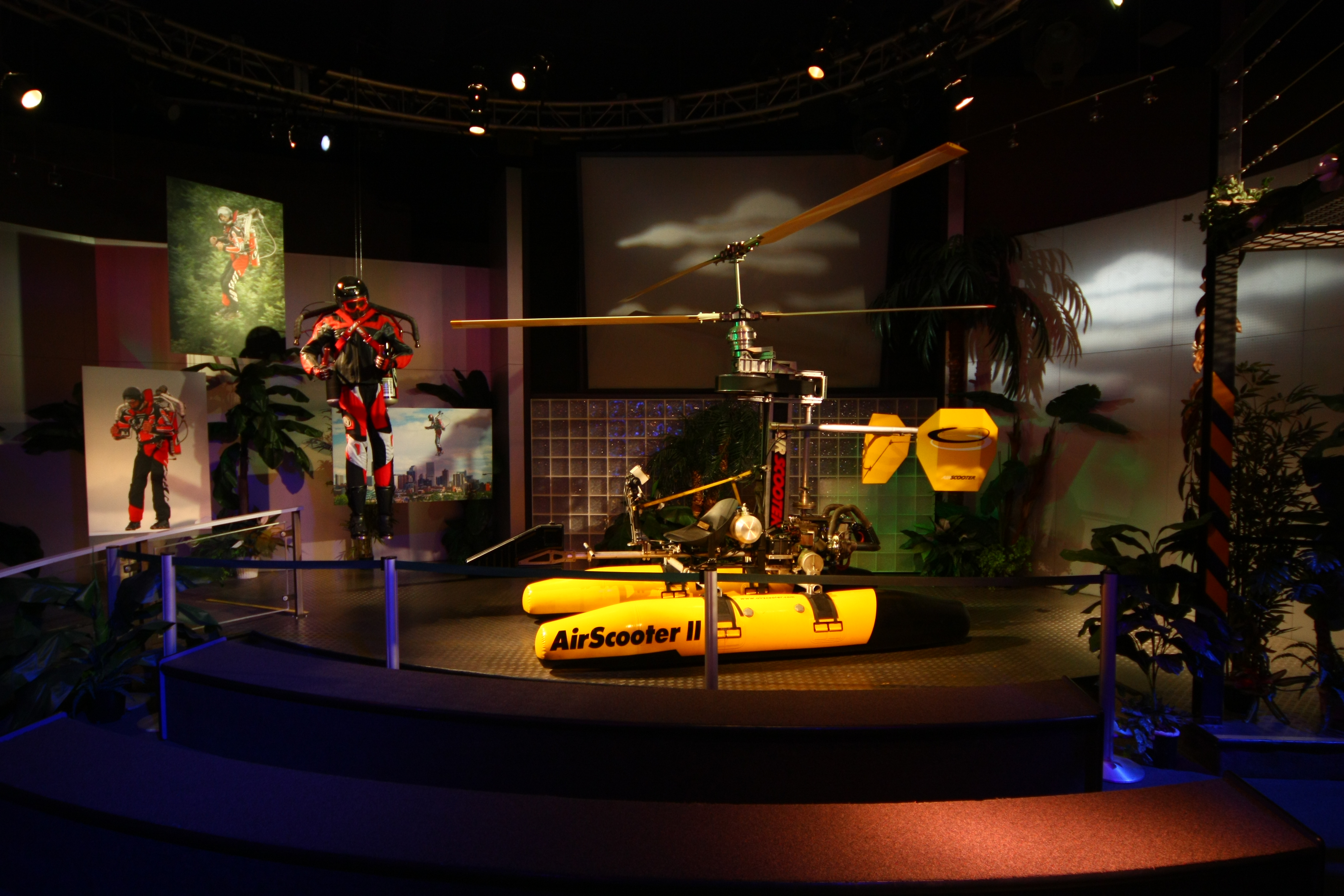
The Air Scooter

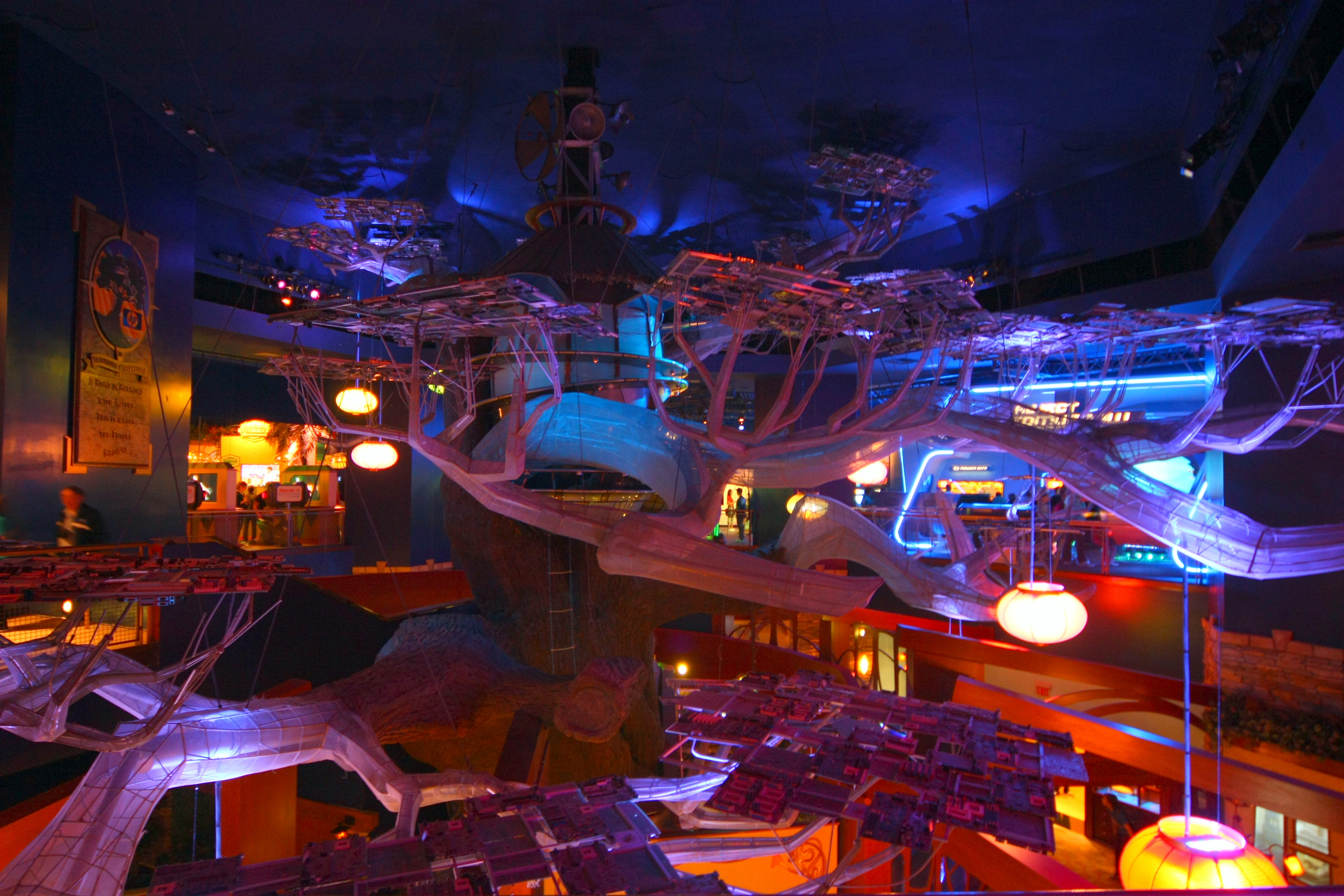
The technology tree

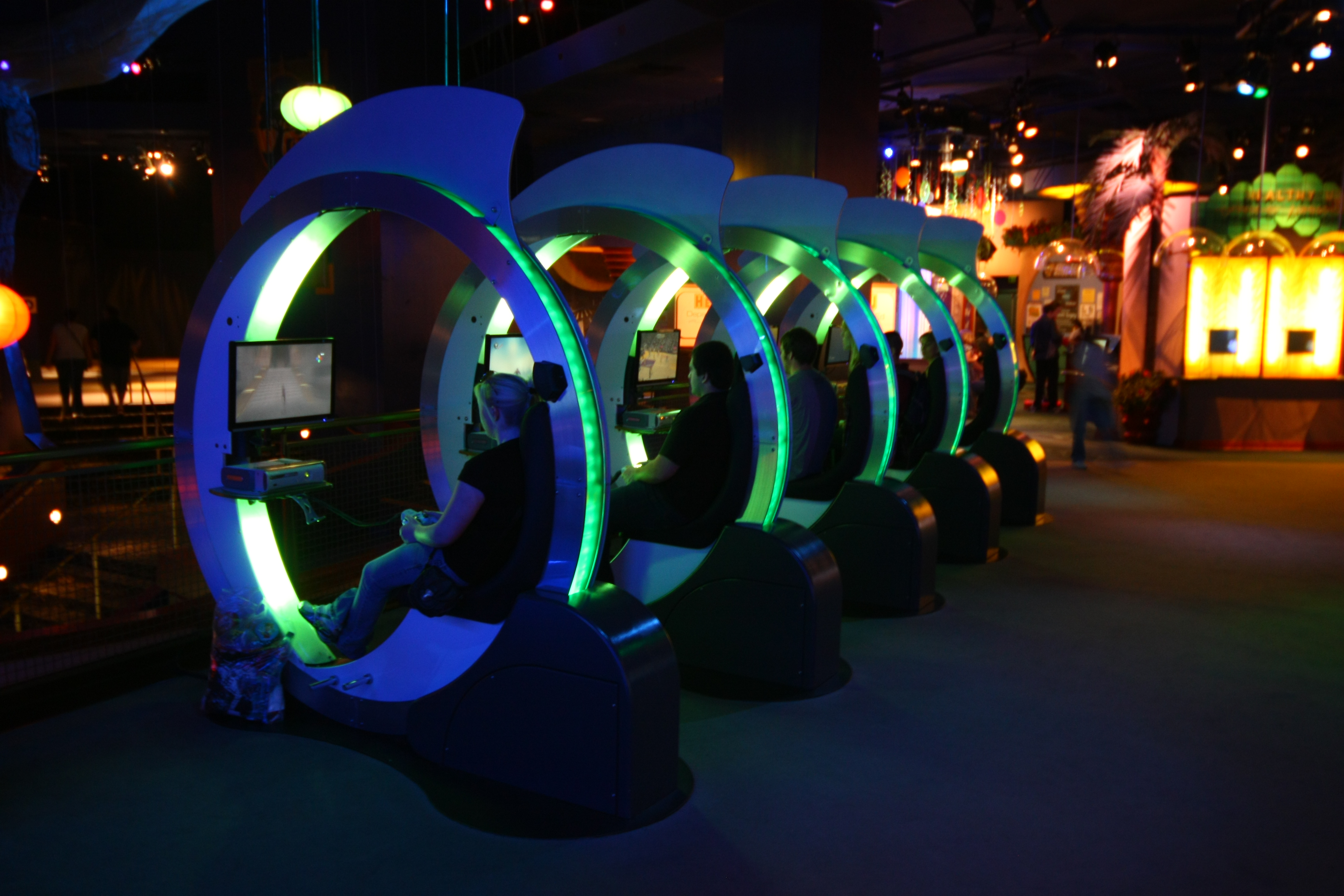
Xbox Row

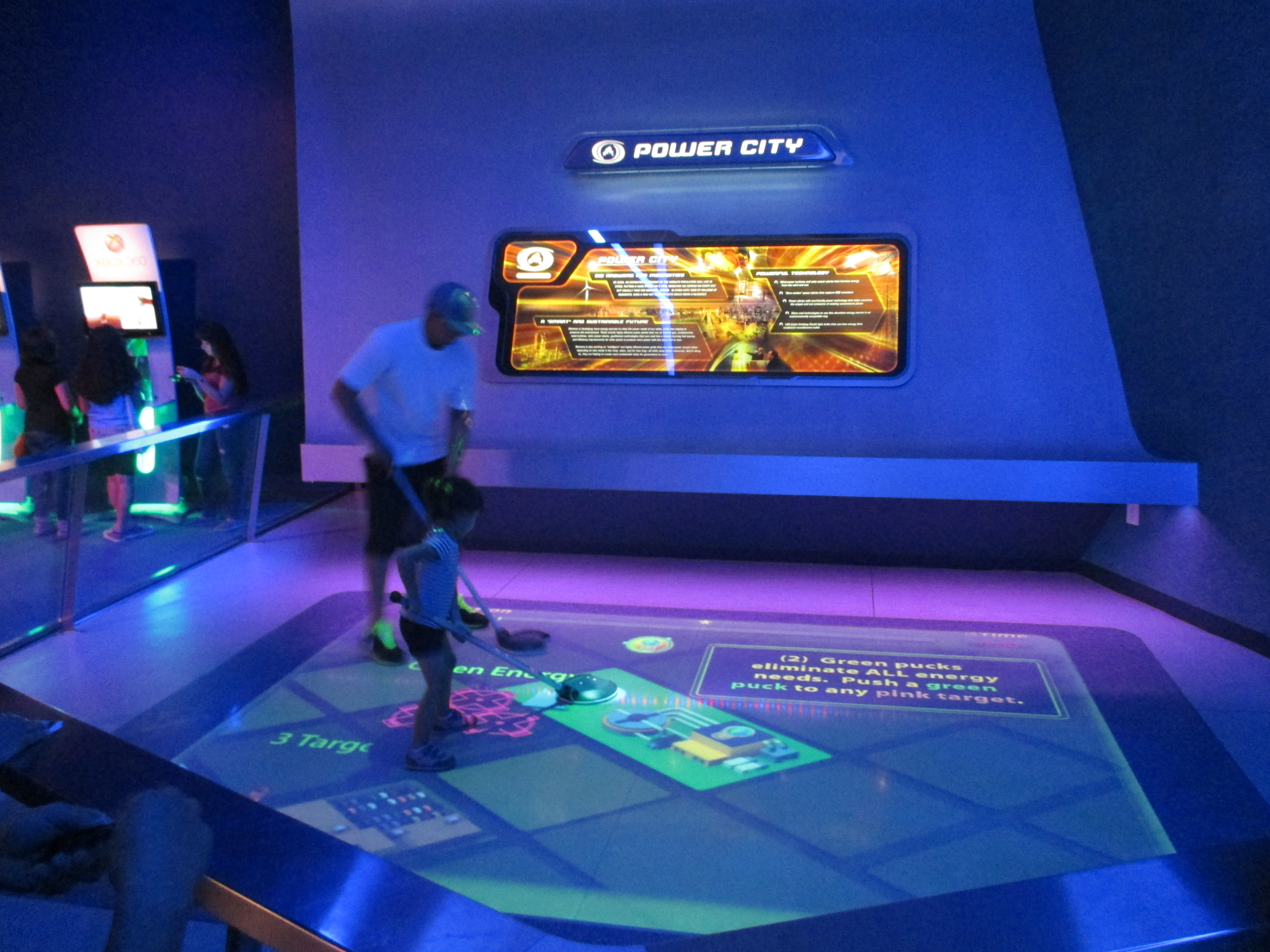
Power City (part of Project Tomorrow)
