= America the Beautiful (1958 film) =

1960 film

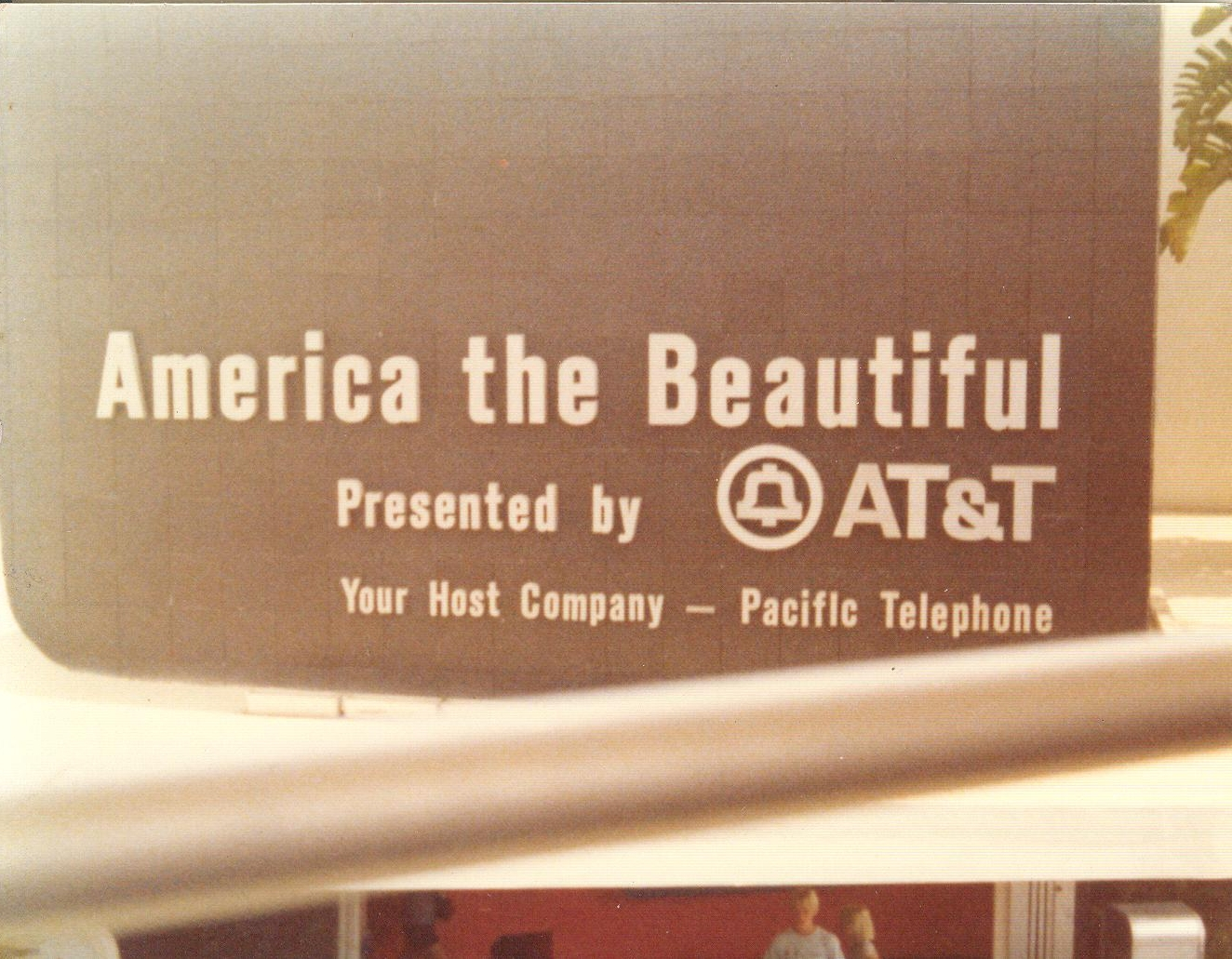

Disneyland
- Area: Tomorrowland
- Status: Removed
- Opening date: 1960 (first tenancy); 1996 (second tenancy)
- Closing date: 1984 (first tenancy); 1997 (second tenancy)
- Replaced: The World Beneath Us
- Replaced by: Wonders of China (post 1960–1984); Rocket Rods (post 1996–1997)

Magic Kingdom
- Area: Tomorrowland
- Status: Removed
- Opening date: 1971
- Closing date: 1979
- Replaced by: Magic Carpet Round The World; American Journeys; The Timekeeper (1994-2006); Monsters, Inc. Laugh Floor (2007-Present)

Ride statistics
- Attraction type: Show

America the Beautiful was a 360° movie attraction in Circarama created by Walt Disney Productions for the American exhibit at the 1958 Brussels World's Fair. The exhibit was sponsored by the Ford Motor Company. After the fair ended, the film was exhibited in 1959 for six weeks, dubbed in Russian, at the American National Exhibition in Moscow, Russia. The film had its American debut at Disneyland in California in 1960, and it was later added to Walt Disney World's Magic Kingdom in Florida in 1971. The Disneyland attraction was housed in the Circle-Vision 360 Theater in Tomorrowland, replacing A Tour of the West, which had played there since Disneyland's opening day, July 17, 1955. The film was subsequently revised several times, eventually closing in 1984, when it was replaced by American Journeys.

Circle-Vision 360 is a film technique that uses multiple cameras arranged in a circle. The viewing image is displayed on a large circular screen. The film's rendition of the title song would later be used in Great Moments with Mr. Lincoln.

The Disney 360 film processes were created and refined by Ub Iwerks and son Don Iwerks in the 1950s and 1960s.

In September 1959, Disneyland Records (now Walt Disney Records) released a vinyl LP album called "America the Beautiful" to tie in with the Russian dub and subsequent Disneyland Park premiere of the Circarama film. Branded as a "Music Mural", the gatefold cover contained a book illustrated with photos. The recording was not a soundtrack of the attraction but instead a collection of twelve American folk and popular songs performed by Disney studio artists.
