= The Timekeeper =

Former attraction at Disney parks

Disneyland Park (Paris)
- Name: Le Visionarium; Un Voyage à Travers le Temps
- Area: Discoveryland
- Status: Removed
- Opening date: April 12, 1992
- Closing date: September 5, 2004
- Replaced by: Buzz Lightyear Laser Blast

Tokyo Disneyland
- Name: Visionarium
- Area: Tomorrowland
- Status: Removed
- Opening date: April 15, 1993
- Closing date: September 1, 2002
- Replaced: American Journeys
- Replaced by: Buzz Lightyear's Astro Blasters

Magic Kingdom
- Area: Tomorrowland
- Status: Removed
- Opening date: November 21, 1994
- Closing date: February 26, 2006
- Replaced: American Journeys
- Replaced by: Monsters, Inc. Laugh Floor

Ride statistics
- Attraction type: Circle-Vision Theater
- Designer: Walt Disney Imagineering
- Theme: Time Travel
- Music: Bruce Broughton
- Host: Timekeeper (Robin Williams) and Nine-Eye (Rhea Perlman)
- Audio-animatronics: 2
- Wheelchair accessible

The Timekeeper (also known as From Time to Time and Un Voyage à Travers le Temps) was a 1992 Circle-Vision 360° film that was presented at three Disney parks around the world. It was the first Circle-Vision show that was arranged and filmed with an actual plot and not just visions of landscapes, and the first to utilize Audio-Animatronics. The film featured a cast of European film actors from France, Italy, Belgium, Russia, and England. The film was shown in highly stylized circular theaters, and featured historic and futuristic details both on the interior and exterior.

The Timekeeper and its original European counterpart Le Visionarium marked the first time that the Circle-Vision film process was used to deliver a narrative story line. This required a concept to explain the unusual visual characteristics of the Theater, hence the character Nine-Eye. Nine-Eye was sent through Time by The Timekeeper, so that she could send back the surrounding images as she recorded them in whichever era she found herself in.

The European attraction was also known by its film name as Un Voyage à Travers le Temps, while the Japanese version was simply named "Visionarium", with the caption From Time to Time on the poster. The American Film Theater was known as "Transportarium" for a period of six months after it debuted, but the name was later dropped in lieu of "Tomorrowland Metropolis Science Center", or formally "The Timekeeper".

== History ==
Le Visionarium (the original title) was the first Circle-Vision 360° film in which Imagineers wanted to tell an immersive story and attempt a light-hearted dialogue, without just switching between scenes of landscapes, as had been done in all of the previous Circle-Vision films.

The original concept for the film had included Jules Verne and the culture of past and present European history and events, and new inventions. Along with the previous elements, the story had to do with the idea of Time Travel with one concept including a child that explored the story of the great European scientists of the past on an intelligent computer. However, to keep the audience focused and use imagination to depict situations and places that do not cater to the average person, the number of visions of the past and extreme situations of the plot kept increasing all the time for the project.

The film first premiered in Discoveryland at Disneyland Paris on April 12, 1992, as Le Visionarium. It was an extravagant attraction, and was touted by then-Disney CEO Michael Eisner as the showcase attraction of the land at the time. However, TIME Magazine derided the film as a "flop" of a "wan drama" in its review of Disneyland Paris. The next year, the third incarnation of the ride opened at Tokyo Disneyland, as part of that park's 10th Anniversary Celebration.

The attraction had long been on the Discoveryland USA proposal for the Magic Kingdom at the Walt Disney World Resort. However, when financial difficulties arose because of the EuroDisney Project, this Discoveryland project was canceled. At one point, the attraction was to be extended into a restaurant featured next door to the attraction. The Plaza Pavilion was to receive a makeover as the "Astronomer's Club", where a stage would have featured actors portraying famed scientists such as Leonardo da Vinci, Isaac Newton, or Galileo, who would appear in the restaurant, and then be called back to the past by either Nine-Eye or Timekeeper.

However, the film was named From Time to Time and opened in the Magic Kingdom's Circle-Vision Theater, rechristened "Transportarium" on November 21, 1994, as part of the New Tomorrowland expansion. Six months later, the attraction underwent some name changes. The Theater was renamed "Tomorrowland Metropolis Science Center", and the film was formally known as The Timekeeper.

In 2001, the attraction was moved to the seasonal list of attractions along with Walt Disney's Carousel of Progress due to the September 11 attacks. In February 2006, the Walt Disney World Resort reported that The Timekeeper was to be closed on February 26, 2006. Walt Disney World's version was the last version of the attraction to be closed. Both the Tokyo Disneyland and Disneyland Paris Visionarium films had closed in 2002 and 2004, respectively.

== Pre-show synopsis ==
=== European pre-show ===
Guests were ushered into a dimly-lit library-like chamber, complete with several artifacts, such as models of Jules Verne's Nautilus from Twenty Thousand Leagues Under the Seas and Albatross from The Clipper of the Clouds, Da Vinci's flying machine, or the first balloon ever created. A short movie about the history of Renault making cars is shown (until this company dropped its sponsorship in 2002). Guests were introduced to Timekeeper, who told them they were about to join him in an experimentation by viewing his last and greatest invention: his extraordinary machine to explore Time. Before he introduced it, he gave a short speech on how his machine would change the world just as the ones that surrounded guests in the pre-show room. He even sang briefly about visionaries. After that, he introduced the crowd to "Nine-Eye", and explained how she would travel through Time first and let guests see this through her eyes. Guests then watched Nine-Eye's training videos, which included a plunge over Niagara Falls, a flight into a barn full of dynamite in Topeka, Kansas, a swirling ride aboard a centrifugator, and lastly, hitching a ride on a space shuttle.

=== Japanese pre-show ===
This pre-show scene was similar to the European version, however with some differences. Instead of the dark circular enclave as in the Paris location, a bright open area was present. The wall that separated the building from the Tomorrowland corridor was a large stained-glass mural featuring 22 famous inventors and visionaries. Also featured was the Timekeeper's study, library, and laboratory. The pre-show area also featured a 20-foot model of Da Vinci's Heliocentric Solar System, the Nautilus from Verne's Twenty Thousand Leagues Under the Seas, the Albatross from Verne's The Clipper of the Clouds, a real 1920s film projector from Walt Disney Pictures, and an actual copy of Verne's novel, Twenty Thousand Leagues Under the Seas. This location's film focused on Verne and H.G. Wells, explaining how their work changed history. Then, Nine-Eye was introduced to guests.

=== American pre-show ===
Before the actual show, guests were introduced to the invention of the show, "Circumvisual PhotoDroid", more frequently referred to as "Nine-Eye". The nine eyes she had represented the nine cameras used in filming the show in the round, thus showing the view from one of her "eyes" on each of the nine movie screens. She was the latest development by The Timekeeper, the inventor of the Time Machine. Guests were invited to be witnesses of the first use ever of the newly invented Machine. Guests also watched Nine-Eye's training videos, which included a plunge over Niagara Falls, a flight into a barn full of dynamite in Topeka, Kansas, and lastly, hitching a ride on a Space Shuttle.

== Attraction synopsis ==
=== The film ===
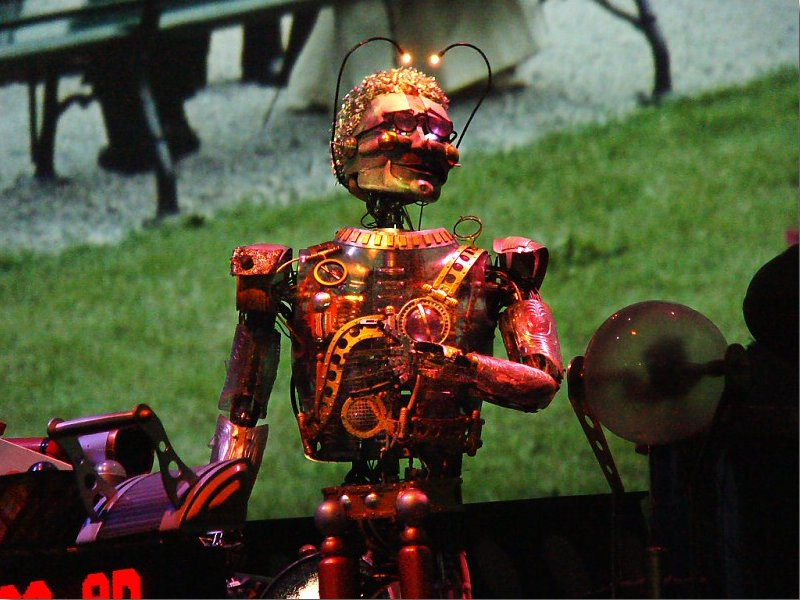
The Timekeeper animatronic at Disneyland Paris.

After guests entered the Theatre, Timekeeper (voiced by Robin Williams) came to life and had Nine-Eye prepared for the journey through Time. Timekeeper then turned on the Machine for its first use, then watched from his control panel as Nine-Eye was thrust back to the Jurassic age period in Earth's history. She narrowly escaped a hungry Allosaurus as Timekeeper sent her to the last great ice age about 12,000 years ago. As she started freezing up, Timekeeper sent her to 1450, for what should have been a demonstration of Johannes Gutenberg's Printing Press.

However, Timekeeper messed up and sent her to a Scottish battlefield in which one warrior came after her. Finally once the kinks of the Time Machine got worked out, Timekeeper sent Nine-Eye to the year 1503, at the height of the Renaissance. The Machine was placed right in the middle of Leonardo da Vinci's workshop, where he was painting the Mona Lisa and working on a model of his Flying Machine. Nine-Eye, being curious, picked up an item close to her, and was quickly noticed by Leonardo, who became fascinated by the strange machine, and started drawing it on paper.

However, the meeting between Nine-Eye and Da Vinci was cut short. Her next stop in Time was 1763 in a French castle, where a child named Wolfgang Amadeus Mozart gave a musical performance to a crowd, which included King Louis XV and Madame de Pompadour. The meeting was once again cut short as she was noticed by the people, who started chasing her through various hallways. Timekeeper then decided to send her to the 1878 Exposition Universelle, but the Machine was stuck on fast forward, so she witnessed a Paris skyline in such a motion that the progress of the Eiffel Tower, the symbol of the 1889 Exposition Universelle, was shown in the background. Finally Timekeeper had the Machine stopped in 1900, just in time for the 1900 Exposition Universelle.

Timekeeper announced that guests were just in time for a meeting between H. G. Wells and Jules Verne. Nine-Eye hid from the fair-goers but not so that Verne and Wells were hidden. After a brief conversation about their conflicting visions of the Future, Wells walked away, leaving Verne with a model of his Time Machine, which Verne had just criticized as impossible. After a sarcastic comment about time travel from Verne, Nine-Eye rebutted his claim and appeared to the author. Jules Verne decided to take a closer look at her and tried to grab her. Timekeeper, seeing this, tried to bring her back to the present, but accidentally took Verne as well.

Timekeeper and Nine-Eye, realizing their mistake, tried to send him back, but he refused after discovering he had finally arrived in the future he had always dreamed of. He begged for them to show him the world of the present in 10 minutes or less, so he could return to 1900 and deliver his speech at the Exhibition (which made Timekeeper ironically reply that he did it in 80 days). They agreed, and Timekeeper set the Machine for the present date. He sent Verne and Nine-Eye to a dark tunnel, which Verne believed to be a "dark future". They were unaware they were standing in a railroad tunnel. The next thing to happen was a collision between Jules Verne and a French TGV train, with Verne becoming a new hood ornament.

From the train, Jules Verne and Nine-Eye explored the modern streets of Paris (with Verne walking among the traffic, nearly causing an accident), which led Verne, curious, to try driving. As such, Timekeeper put him in the front seat of a race car, and Verne took off, albeit in the wrong direction. Verne then enjoyed a bobsled run. After this bobsled run, Timekeeper sent Verne and Nine-Eye to the bottom of the sea to show Verne how his 1870 novel Twenty Thousand Leagues Under the Seas came to life.

The scene then changed, going from being underwater to flying. Jules Verne now stood in a balloon soaring over Red Square in Moscow, sharing it with a Russian couple on their honeymoon. Since Verne's presence was inconvenient, Timekeeper sent him to Roissy Airport near Paris. The two Russian lovers were accidentally taken to Paris as well, where they could start their honeymoon. As Verne witnessed planes (the "flying wagons" as he called them), he begged for Timekeeper to let him fly. An employee soon arrived, discovered Nine-Eye, and started talking to her. However, Verne, who ventured far from there, was arrested by policemen. With the help of the employee and Timekeeper's grip on time, Verne was freed (these two scenes were not part of Orlando's version).

The screen then showed a flight through the air above various European countrysides featuring castles and mountains. Verne was shown in a helicopter, sitting dangerously close to its open door. After flying over Mont Saint-Michel, Neuschwanstein Castle, various scenes of the English countryside, and New York City's skyline (only in Orlando's version), Verne requested to go even higher. They took him to space, in order to show that another dream of his, space travel, had come true from his book From the Earth to the Moon.

Time began to run out, so Timekeeper and Nine-Eye returned Verne to the site of the Grand Palais of the 1900 Exposition Universelle. However, Timekeeper made one mistake in the wrong year; Verne being in the right place, but at the wrong time, in the 1990s (the present day when the attraction opened). When they finally returned Verne to 1900, H.G. Wells happened to go back to the site of his discussion with Verne, and therefore saw all that went on with the Timekeeper. Wells was flabbergasted, and Verne and Nine-Eye exchanged goodbyes as Wells struggled to understand what just happened. Nine-Eye returned to the present time, and now that guests had witnessed a "flawless" demonstration of his Time Machine, Timekeeper decided to send Nine-Eye into the future along with a few guests that volunteered to travel with her.

Timekeeper then sent Nine-Eye and selected guests to 2189, 300 years after the Exposition Universelle of 1889 and the completion of the Eiffel Tower (both evidenced by the Timekeeper's clock and by the appearance of the number "300" on the Eiffel Tower). As they explored a futuristic Paris aboard a flying car named Reinastella, they saw Jules Verne and H.G. Wells appearing in what looked like Wells' Time Machine from 1900. A stunned Nine-Eye questioned how they got there, to which Verne replied, "In the future, anything is possible!". The show ended as they jetted off, and Timekeeper wished everyone well. As guests left, Timekeeper made plans to see other important events in history and in the future with his Machine and Nine-Eye.

=== Voice cast ===
| Character | Voice actor (American) | Voice actor (French) | Voice actor (Japanese) |
|---|---|---|---|
| Timekeeper | Robin Williams | Michel Leeb | George Tokoro |
| Nine-Eye | Rhea Perlman | Myriam Boyer | Yuki Saito |

=== Film cast ===
| Character | Actor |
|---|---|
| Jules Verne | Michel Piccoli |
| H.G. Wells | Jeremy Irons |
| Leonardo da Vinci | Franco Nero |
| Mona Lisa | Anna Pernicci |
| Louis XV | Jean Rochefort |
| Madame de Pompadour | Nathalie Baye |
| Roissy Employee | Gérard Depardieu |
| Mr. Verne's Translator | Patrick Bauchau |

== Filming locations ==
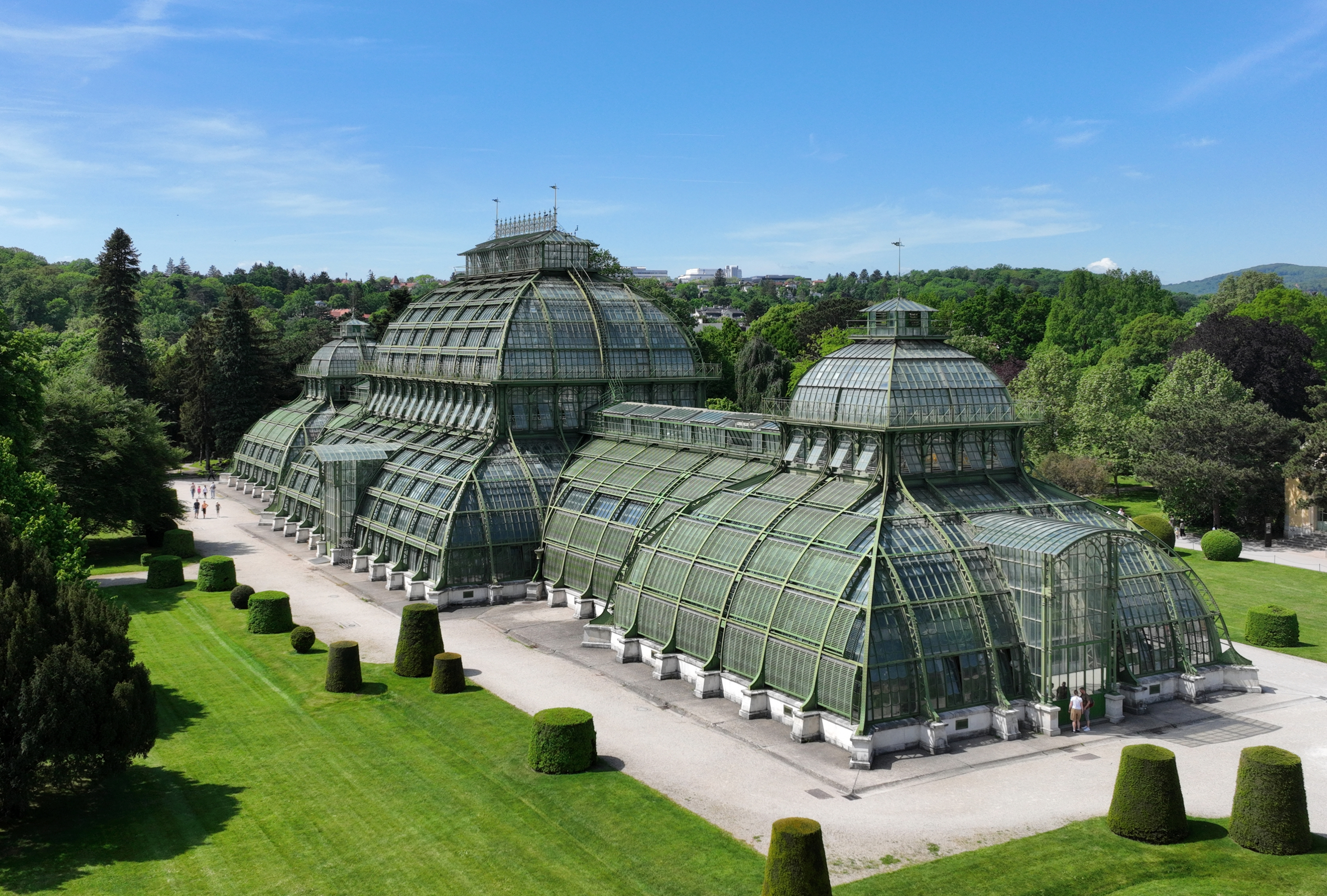
Palm Pavilion in Schönbrunn Palace, where Nine-Eye meets Jules Verne

- Alnwick Castle, Northumberland, England, United Kingdom
  - Site of Scottish Battle scene
- Castello Orsini-Odescalchi, Bracciano, Italy
  - Set of Leonardo da Vinci's workshop
- Château de Chantilly, Chantilly, Oise, France
  - Site of Mozart's performance before Louis XV
- Palm Pavilion, Schloss Schönbrunn, Hietzing, Vienna, Austria
  - Site for exterior shots for the Exposition Universelle of 1900
- Rouffach, Haut-Rhin, Alsace, France
  - Location of the scene featuring the TGV
- Paris, Île-de-France, Val-d'Oise, France
  - Site for the location of Parisian traffic jam scene
- Knittelfeld, Steiermark, Austria
  - The Renault Grand Prix Scene took place at the Österreichring
- Olympic Bobsleigh Run, Innsbruck, Tyrol, Austria
  - Site for shots for the Bobsleigh Run
- Lyford Cay, New Providence Island, Commonwealth of the Bahamas, West Indies
  - Site of deep-sea dive scene
- Red Square, Central Federal District, Moscow, Soviet Union
  - Location of hot air balloon from the European and Japanese versions
- Roissy-en-France, Île-de-France, Val-d'Oise, France
  - Location of Charles de Gaulle Airport scene from the European and Japanese versions
- Mont Saint-Michel, Normandy, Manche, France
  - Fly over Mont Saint-Michel
- Neuschwanstein Castle, Bavaria, Germany
  - Fly over Neuschwanstein Castle
- Calais, Pas-de-Calais, France
  - Fly over the European coastline
- New York City, New York, United States of America
  - Fly over New York City from the American version

== Film variations ==
The original European version of the film was different from the American version. A certain number of scenes were cut including the hot air balloon scene, some European coastline scenes, and a dialogue between Jules Verne and an employee of Paris' Charles de Gaulle Airport. The only addition in the American version was a New York City skyline scene. The hot air balloon scene was filmed over Red Square in Moscow, and as such taken under intense conditions by Walt Disney Productions in the then-Soviet Union.

| European and Japanese scene order | American scene order |
|---|---|
| Jurassic Period | Same |
| Ice Age | Same |
| The Anglo-Scottish Wars | Same |
| Da Vinci's Workshop | Same |
| Mozart's Concert in 1763 | Same |
| The Construction of the Eiffel Tower | Same |
| Exposition Universelle of 1900 | Same |
| Jules Verne in the present day | Same |
| Verne's Collision with TGV | Same |
| Traffic scene near Arc de Triumph | Same |
| Bobsled Run | Same |
| Deep-sea exploration scene | Same |
| Up in the air from Red Square | Omitted |
| Charles De Gaulle Airport | Omitted |
| Flying over European countrysides | Same, although the Walt Disney World version goes from underwater to flying |
| Omitted | New York city skyline |
| Outer Space | Same |
| Return to Paris, today | Same |
| Return to Paris in 1900 | Same |
| Paris in 2189 | Same |
| End | Same |

== Aftermath and the Effects of September 11, 2001 ==
After being placed on a seasonal schedule in April 2001, The Timekeeper at Walt Disney World was open on a sporadic schedule during the busy seasons. Some attribute it to the following criticisms, which the overseas versions of the attraction had not been faced with:

- Guests may have found it hard to stand or strainful on the eyes
- The lack of familiar Disney characters
- The building's entrance was very inconspicuous and did not feature a large rotating globe icon or full title.

After the events of September 11, 2001 in the United States, the attraction faced even harder times, due in part to a general decline in tourism due to the terrorist acts. The fact the film featured a scene of New York that still included the now-destroyed World Trade Center prompted a change that saw the Timekeeper's clock in this segment register the "current year" as 2000, removing any mentions of the towers from the attraction.

However, the attraction lasted five more years. During the time when construction was occurring on Stitch's Great Escape!, it was open more frequently along with Walt Disney's Carousel of Progress. On days when the show was not opened, the queue was a meet-and-greet for Disney characters such as Stitch and Pixar characters Buzz Lightyear, and Mr. Incredible, Elastigirl, and Frozone from The Incredibles.

Until February 2006, The Timekeeper in Walt Disney World Resort was the last Timekeeper still operating, as the Tokyo Disneyland version closed in 2002 and was replaced with Buzz Lightyear's Astro Blasters in 2004, and the Disneyland Paris version closed in 2004 and was replaced by Buzz Lightyear Laser Blast in 2006, although the Disneyland Paris version closed mainly because it lost its sponsor, Renault.

In early 2007, the former location of The Timekeeper became home to Monsters, Inc. Laugh Floor. The attraction building still retains most of the elements of the previous tenant, including the water columns in the queue and the basic Circle-Vision theater. However, the Theater floor has been modified to include seating and several of the screens are now covered by other elements.

== Failed proposal for the Disneyland Resort ==
During the early 1990s, then Disney-Executive, Michael Eisner released ambitious plans for changes to the parks. "Tomorrowland 2055" was planned for a remake of Tomorrowland and the Disneyland Resort in California. The Timekeeper was to be a showcase attraction, along with ExtraTERRORestrial Alien Encounter and Plectu's Fantastic Intergalactic Revue. One promotional brochure had Delta Air Lines sponsoring the film. These plans were later scrapped due to financial difficulties within the Parks & Resorts division, most stemming from the billion dollar losses incurred with the EuroDisney project. However, some clips of The Timekeeper could be seen in the queue for Rocket Rods, which utilized the Circle-Vision 360° Theater.

Other information placed Visionarium as an opening-day attraction at the unbuilt park next to Disneyland, WestCOT. The show would have been housed in a European Renaissance building in a European section of the WestCOT version of World Showcase. However, like the "Tomorrowland 2055" plan, this did not occur either.

== Technical aspects ==
- Film negative format (mm/video inches)
  - 9 x 35 mm
- Cinematographic process
  - Circle-Vision 360
- Printed film format
  - 9 x 35 mm
- Aspect ratio
  - 12.00 : 1

== Soundtrack notes ==
=== Audio dialogue ===
The three versions of the attraction featured a soundtrack of dialogue in each park's country's native tongue (French, Japanese, and English).

Both the Tokyo Disneyland and Disneyland Paris versions featured guest-selectable translations on headset, which included :

- For Paris :
  - English
  - German
  - Spanish
  - Italian
  - Dutch
- For Tokyo :
  - English
  - Mandarin Chinese

Since both the European and Japanese versions opened before Orlando's version was created, the voicecast and dialogue are completely different. The American-style dialogue was not present in these versions, and it was a close translation of the French dialog.

=== Featured music ===
- While the American version received a different soundtrack from the other versions, they were both scored by Bruce Broughton.
- During the scene of the conversation between Verne and Wells at the Exposition Universelle, the song heard in the background is called Estudiantina, or Band of Students Waltz. It was composed in 1883 by Émile Waldteufel.
- When Verne returns to the Exhibition building in the 1990s, "Motownphilly" by Boyz II Men can be heard in the background. It was meant to represent popular music at the time of filming. The song can be found on their 1991 debut album Cooleyhighharmony.

== Foreign language titles ==
- French: Le Visionarium
- Japanese: ビジョナリアム – Visionarium

== Renault's involvement with the film ==
The French automobile company Renault is heavily featured throughout the attraction, since it sponsored it in Europe between 1992 and 2002.

- In the film :
  - In the scene where Jules Verne steps off the curb into a busy street in front of the Arc de Triomphe, the car that almost hits him is a five-door hatchback, Renault Clio, at the time of filming the newest model in Renault's fleet of cars.
  - In the Formula 1 scene, where Jules Verne drives a race car, he is seated and drives the Renault F1 vehicle.
  - The flying car carrying a family in the scene of Paris in the future was imagined by Renault and is called a "Reinastella".
- In front of the building in Paris :
  - A Reinastella model was displayed near the entrance, but it was removed in 2002, when Renault dropped sponsorship. However it remained in the final scene of the film. The prototype car was then seen around Europe in auto shows, most recently on display at Renault's showroom on the Champs-Élysées.
  - When the prop sat outside the theater, a plaque beneath it read :

Blast into the Future by checking out the Renault Reinastella! The Reinastella's futuristic design features a vocal command system that makes steering wheels and accelerators a thing of the past. With a cruising height that ranges from 15 centimetres (5.9 in) to 150 metres (490 ft) above surfaces, the Reinastella flies up to 300 kilometres per hour (190 mph). The next time you're traveling through time, stop into the 24th century and test drive a Renault Reinastella!
