= Vista-United Telecommunications =

- Industry: Telecommunications
- Founded: Orlando, Florida, USA
- Founder: The Walt Disney Company
- Headquarters: Orlando, Florida, USA
- Products: Telecommunications, Internet

Vista-United Telecommunications was the telecommunications company created to service all Disney resorts in Florida and Disney-planned communities such as Celebration, Florida and the Disney Vacation Clubs in Hilton Head Island, South Carolina and Vero Beach, Florida.

The company was created to manage the new telephone and data communications for Walt Disney World. Vista-United was the first company to use underground cabling, the first to use fiber optic cable to provide service to customers, and the first company in Florida to activate 9-1-1 emergency dialing.

Vista-United was, in fact, an independent telephone company for Walt Disney World, however the company was created through a partnership between Vista Communications, Inc., an indirect wholly owned subsidiary of The Walt Disney Company and United Telephone Company of Florida, which later became a part of Sprint.

In 2001, telephone company Smart City Telecom purchased Vista-United, and created an agreement with Disney to ensure telecommunications service for the resort over a long period of time.
