= George Kalogridis =

American businessman (born 1953)

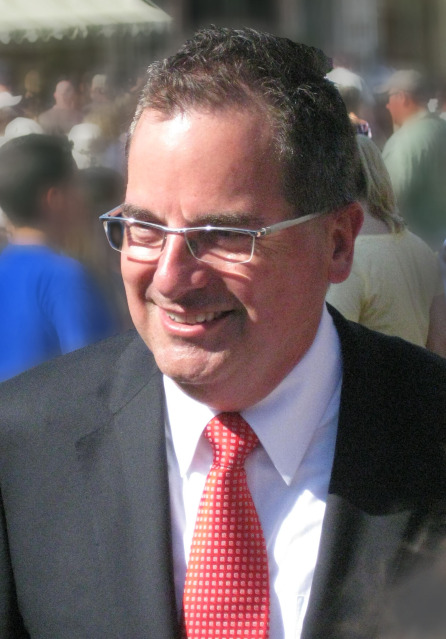
- Kalogridis at the Disneyland Resort 55th Anniversary celebration
- Born: George Anthony Kalogridis; November 19, 1953 (age 71); Winter Haven, Florida
- Education: Sociology
- Alma mater: University of Central Florida
- Occupation(s): President, Disney Segment Development and Enrichment
- Partner: Andy Hardy

George Anthony Kalogridis (born November 19, 1953) is an American corporate executive. Kalogridis is the former president of the Walt Disney World Resort in Lake Buena Vista, Florida. Kalogridis became president of Disney Segment Development and Enrichment for Disney Parks, Experiences and Products in November 2019.

== Early life and education ==
Kalogridis was raised in Winter Haven, and is of Greek ancestry; the Greek spelling of his name is Γιώργος Καλογρίδης. He attended the University of Central Florida and graduated with a degree in sociology in 1976.

== Career ==
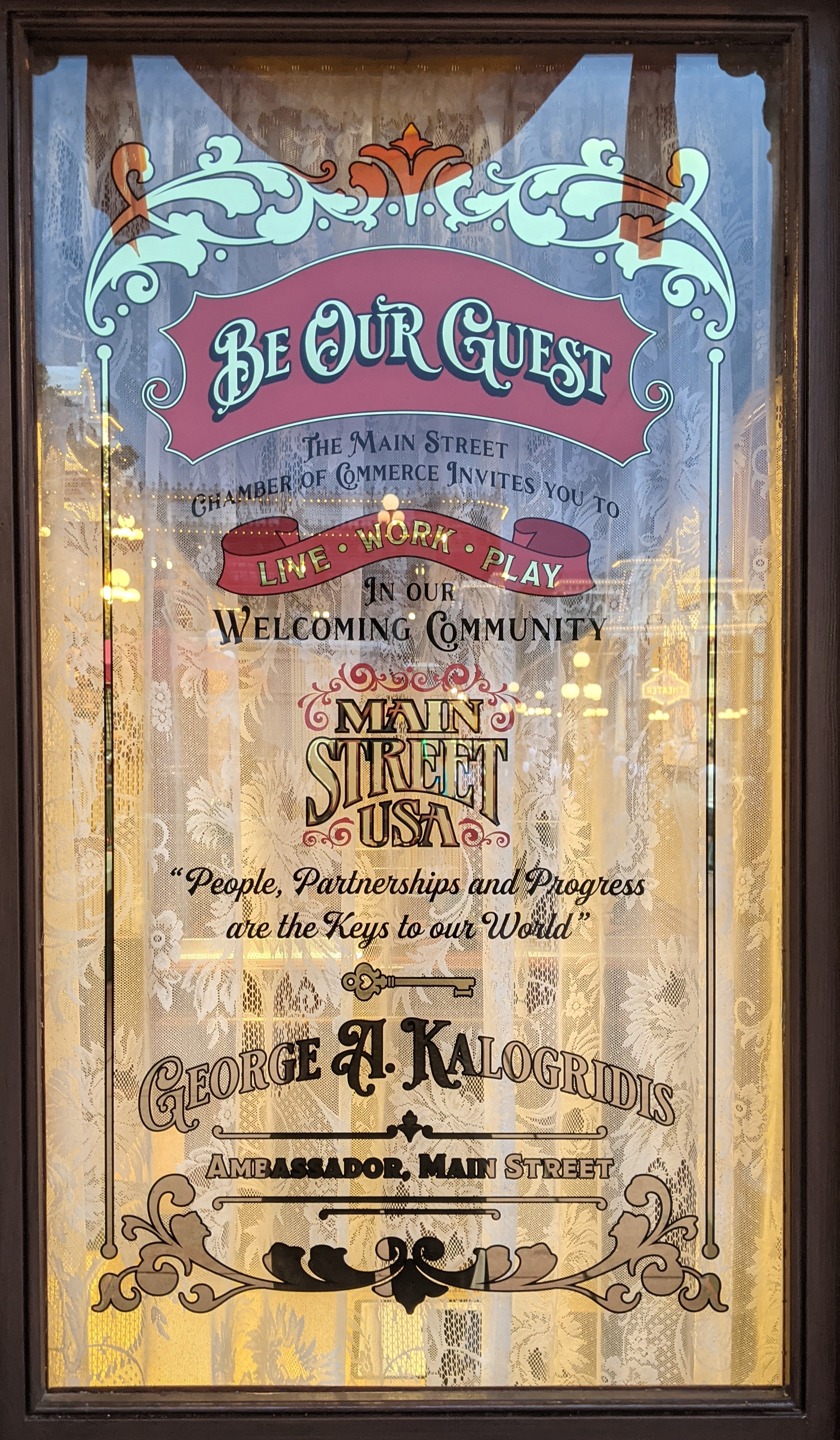
Kalogridis' window at the Main Street, U.S.A. Chamber of Commerce at the Magic Kingdom

Kalogridis has a long history with The Walt Disney Company. He has worked with the company almost exclusively for 40 years. Kalogridis first started working for Disney while he was in college. He bussed tables at Disney's Contemporary Resort when the Walt Disney World Resort first opened in 1971.

Kalogridis quickly moved up the ladder in The Walt Disney Company, becoming vice president of operations at Epcot, senior vice president at the Disneyland Resort from 2000 to 2002, vice president at the Disney Reservation Center in Orlando from 2002 to 2006, chief operating officer (COO) at Disneyland Paris from 2006 to 2009, and president of the Disneyland Resort from 2009 to 2013.

Kalogridis was named president of The Walt Disney World Resort on January 9, 2013.

In 2019, he was promoted to president, Disney Segment Development and Enrichment. He was responsible for developing strategic and operational business initiatives while developing and scaling best practices across sites and lines of business. He also lead the Disney Institute, and served as strategic advisor to park operators. He retired in May 2022.

In September of 2021, Kalogridis was honored with a window on Main Street, U.S.A. at the Magic Kingdom, one of the top honors for Disney Parks cast members.

== Reception ==
In 1999, a customer wrote a letter to Kalogridis, then vice president of Epcot, voicing his dissatisfaction with a rehab of a ride. Kalogridis personally called him at home. "I was floored," the customer said. "He must have been hearing from hundreds of people. For him to make the rounds, I was really impressed by that."

While working as the manager of Disney's Grand Floridian Resort & Spa, a hostess stated that she wished that the grass was dry, since the hotel was going to host a convention on the lawn soon. Kalogridis took some employees and towels with him and dried the lawn off with towels. "That’s the attention to detail – and how he’ll do everything possible for guests – that George is famous for," Meg Crofton, then president of Walt Disney Parks & Resorts, said.

== Personal life ==
Kalogridis lives with his partner Andy Hardy who also works at Disney.

His favorite character is Eeyore, and his favorite movie is Mary Poppins.
