= Metro Orlando Economic Development Commission =

The Orlando Economic Development Commission (EDC) is a not-for-profit, private/public partnership. The EDC serves Orange, Seminole, Lake and Osceola counties and the City of Orlando in Florida.

Since its start in 1977, the Orlando Economic Development Commission, with the support of its community partners, has assisted thousands of companies relocate, expand and grow in the four-county Metro Orlando (Florida) region. This has led to the creation of more than 164,000 jobs; over $8.85 billion in capital investment; and almost 77,000,000 square feet (7,200,000 m^{2}) of office and industrial space leased or constructed.

Companies the EDC has worked with include:

- Darden Restaurants
- Sanford-Burnham Medical Research Institute
- Tupperware Brands Corporation
- Lockheed Martin
- Siemens Energy
- Electronic Arts Tiburon
- JetBlue University
- University of Central Florida
- Rollins College
- Seminole State College of Florida
- Valencia Community College

Rick L. Weddle serves as the President & CEO of the Metro Orlando Economic Development Commission.

The Orlando EDC is also home to the Orlando Film Commission.
