= Expo 67 pavilions =

Exposition buildings in Montreal, Quebec

Coordinates: 45.523°N 73.535°W

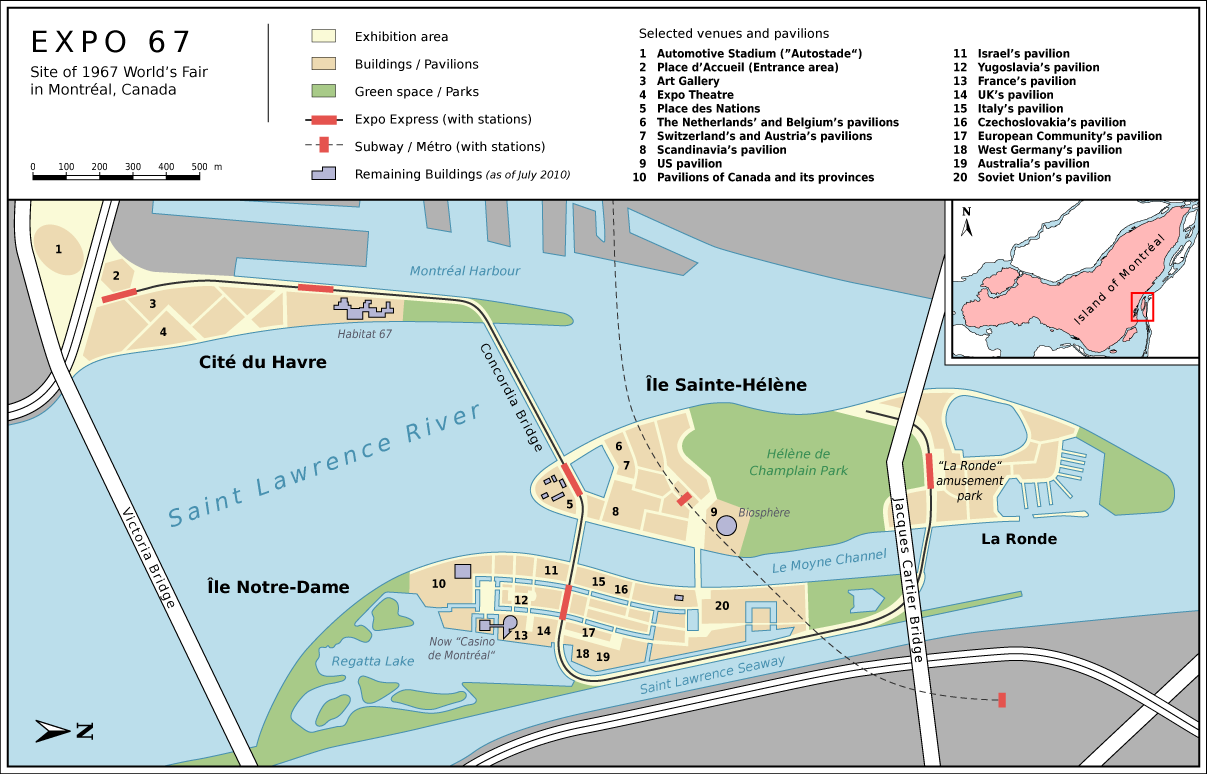
Areamap of Expo 67

Expo 67, a International and Universal Exposition hosted in Montreal in 1967, featured 90 pavilions representing Man and His World, on a theme derived from Terre des Hommes, written by the famous French pilot Antoine de Saint-Exupéry.

The exposition displayed many nations, corporations, industries, technologies, social themes, religions, and designs, including the US pavilion, a geodesic dome designed by Buckminster Fuller. Expo 67 also featured Habitat 67, an urban modular housing complex designed by architect Moshe Safdie, whose units were purchased by private Montrealers after the fair was concluded and is still occupied today.

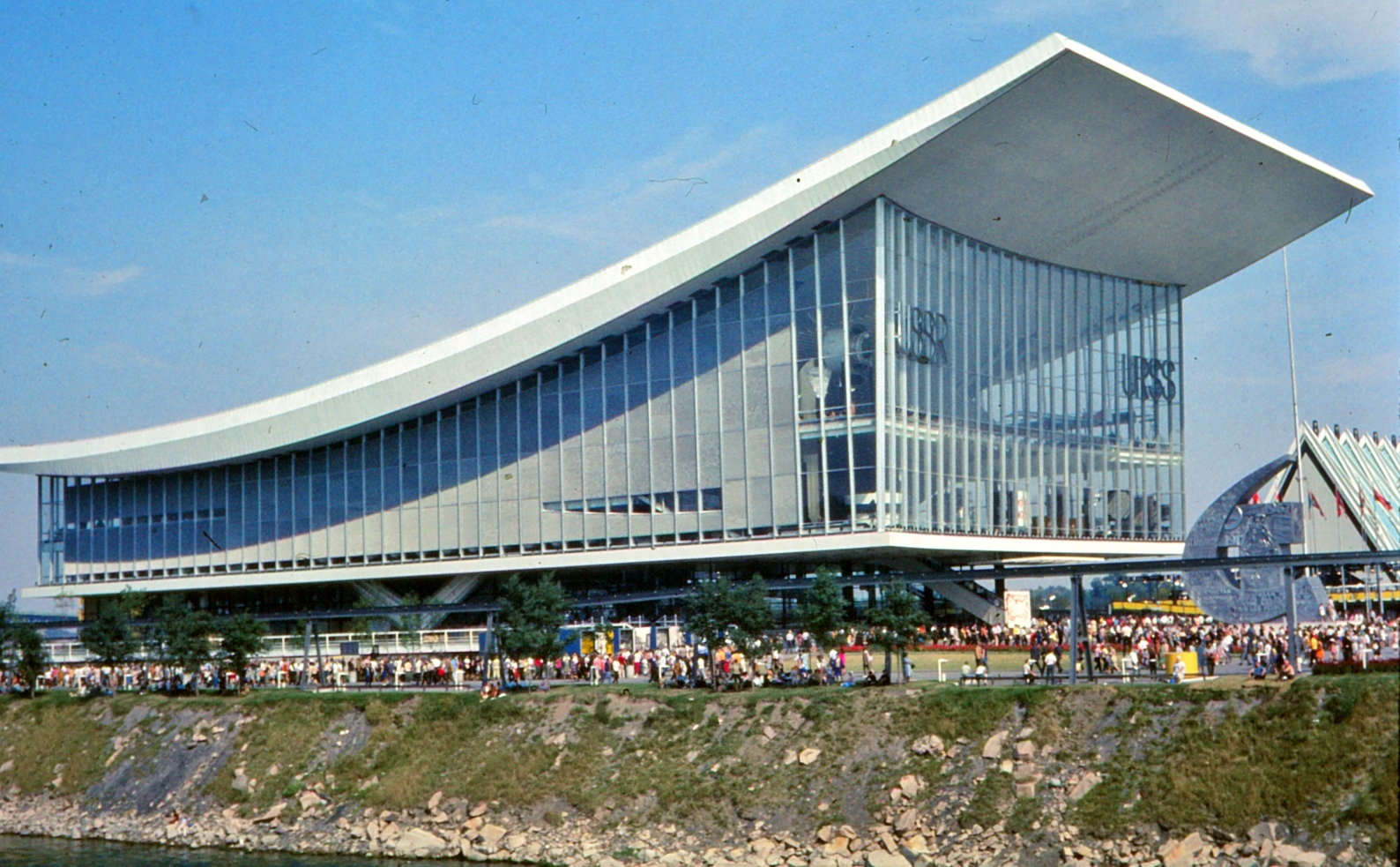
Most visited: USSR Pavilion

The most popular display of the exposition was the soaring Soviet Union pavilion, which attracted about 13 million visitors. Rounding out the top five pavilions (by attendance) were: Canada (11 million visitors), the United States (9 million), France (8.5 million), and Czechoslovakia (8 million).

The participating countries were:

- Africa: Algeria, Cameroon, Chad, Congo, Ivory Coast, Ethiopia, Gabon, Ghana, Kenya, Madagascar, Morocco, Mauritius, Niger, Rwanda, Senegal, Tanzania, Togo, Tunisia, Uganda, and Upper Volta;
- Asia: Burma, Ceylon, Republic of China (Taiwan), Republic of Korea, India, Iran, Israel, Japan, Thailand and the United Arab Republic;
- Australia;
- Europe: Austria, Belgium, Czechoslovakia, Denmark, Finland, France, Federal Republic of Germany, Greece, Iceland, Italy, Monaco, the Netherlands, Norway, Sweden, Switzerland, United Kingdom, the USSR, and Yugoslavia;
- South America & Caribbean: Barbados, Cuba, Grenada, Guyana, Haiti, Jamaica, Trinidad and Tobago, and Venezuela;
- North America: Canada, Mexico, and the United States.

Absent countries included the People's Republic of China, Spain, South Africa (banned from BIE-sanctioned events due to its apartheid policy), and many countries of South America.

== National pavilions ==
(From the Official Guide of Expo 67)

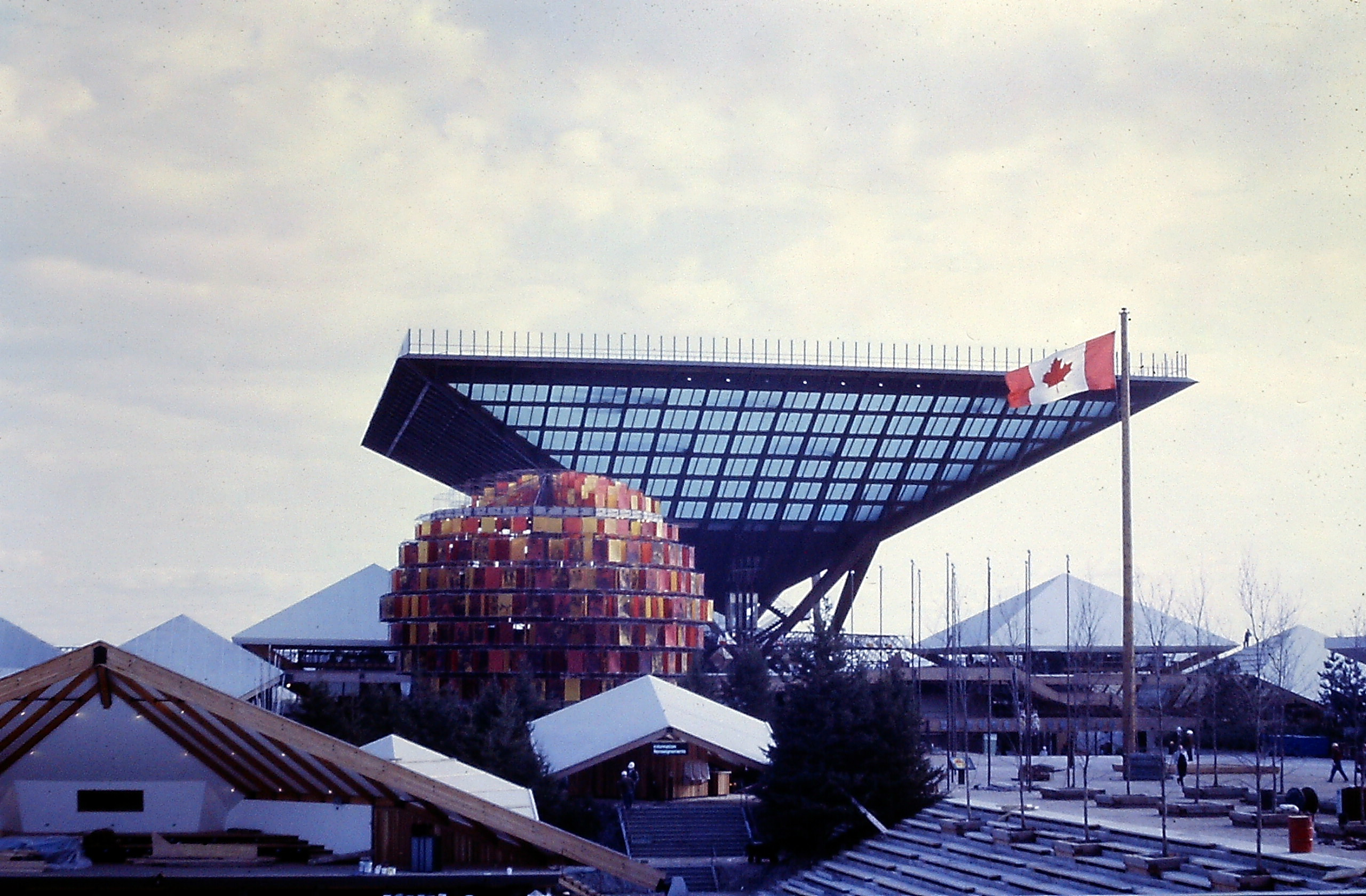
2nd most visited: Canadian Pavilion

- Canadian Pavilion - The distinctive building in the form of a large inverted pyramid called the Katimavik, which is the Inuit word for "Gathering Place". The pavilion was located on a 30,285 sq metre lot and designed by Roderick Robbie, Colin Vaughan, Paul Schoeler and Matt Stankiewicz, with consulting architects Evans St. Gelais and Arthur Erickson. The major attractions in the building included a rotating cinema.
- Africa Place- Countries represented: Cameroon; Chad; Democratic Republic of Congo; Gabon; Ghana; Ivory Coast; Kenya; Madagascar; Niger; Rwanda; Senegal; Tanzania;Uganda.
- Arab Countries - Countries represented: Algeria; Kuwait; Morocco; United Arab Republic (Egypt).
- Australia - Australia's Pavilion featured a large lounge area with prominent Australian oil paintings and seat-activated audio chairs that gave commentary in either French or English on a variety of Australian topics. There was also a static tropical coral display representing the Great Barrier Reef, and a kangaroo enclosure.
- Belgium
- Britain
- Burma
- Ceylon
- Republic of China
- Cuba

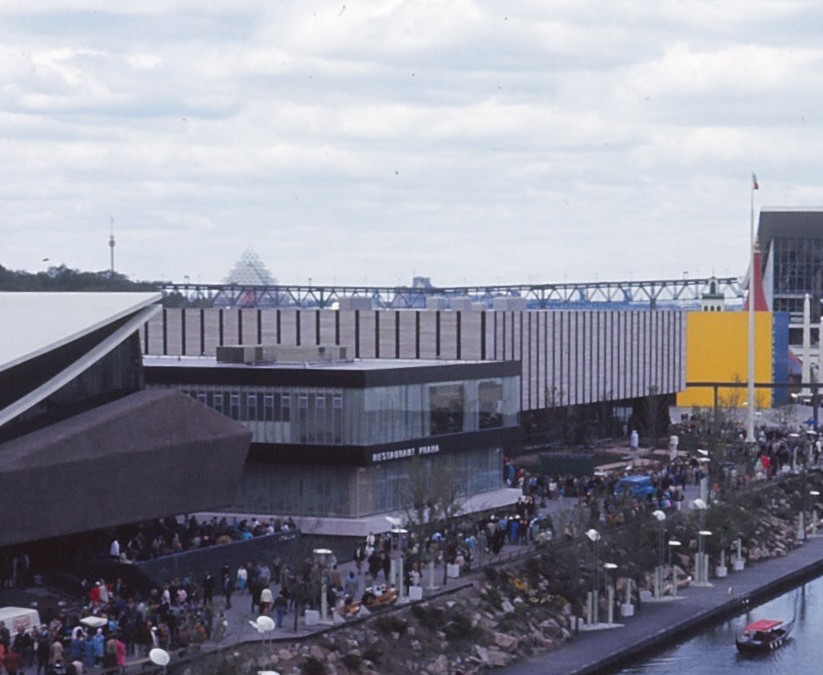
5th most visited: Czechoslovakia pavillon

- Czechoslovakia - featuring the world's first interactive movie, Kinoautomat, directed by Radúz Činčera, as well as an extensive collection of Bohemian glassware.
- Ethiopia
- European Community

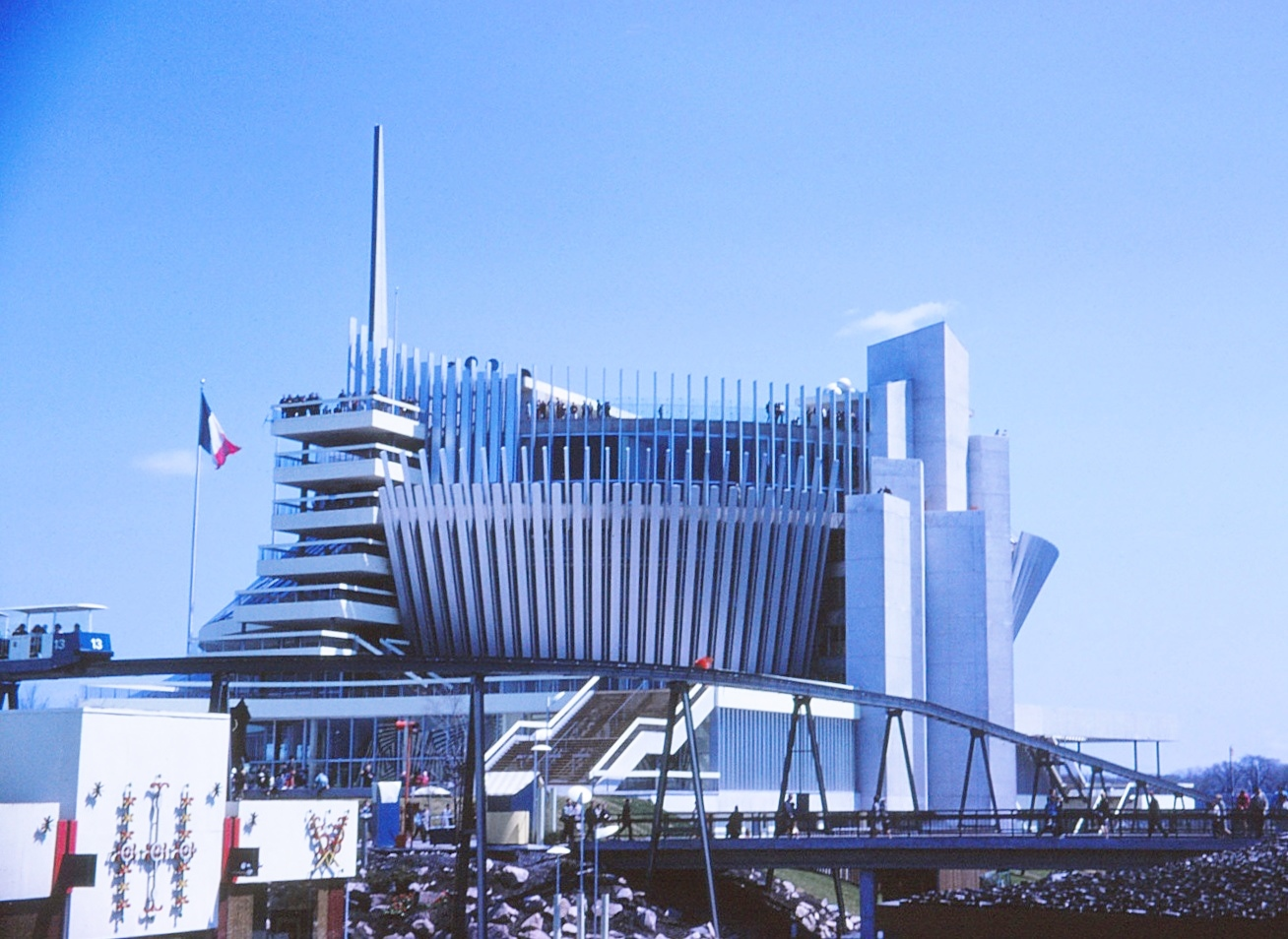
4th most visited: Pavillon de la France

- France
- Greece
- Guyane - Barbados
- Haiti
- India
- Iran
- Israel by Arieh Sharon
- Italy
- Japan
- Republic of Korea
- Mauritius
- Mexico
- Monaco
- Netherlands
- Scandinavia – countries represented: Denmark; Finland; Iceland; Norway; Sweden.
- Switzerland
- Thailand
- Trinidad & Tobago and Grenada
- Tunisia
- Union of Soviet Socialist Republics Pavilion (USSR)

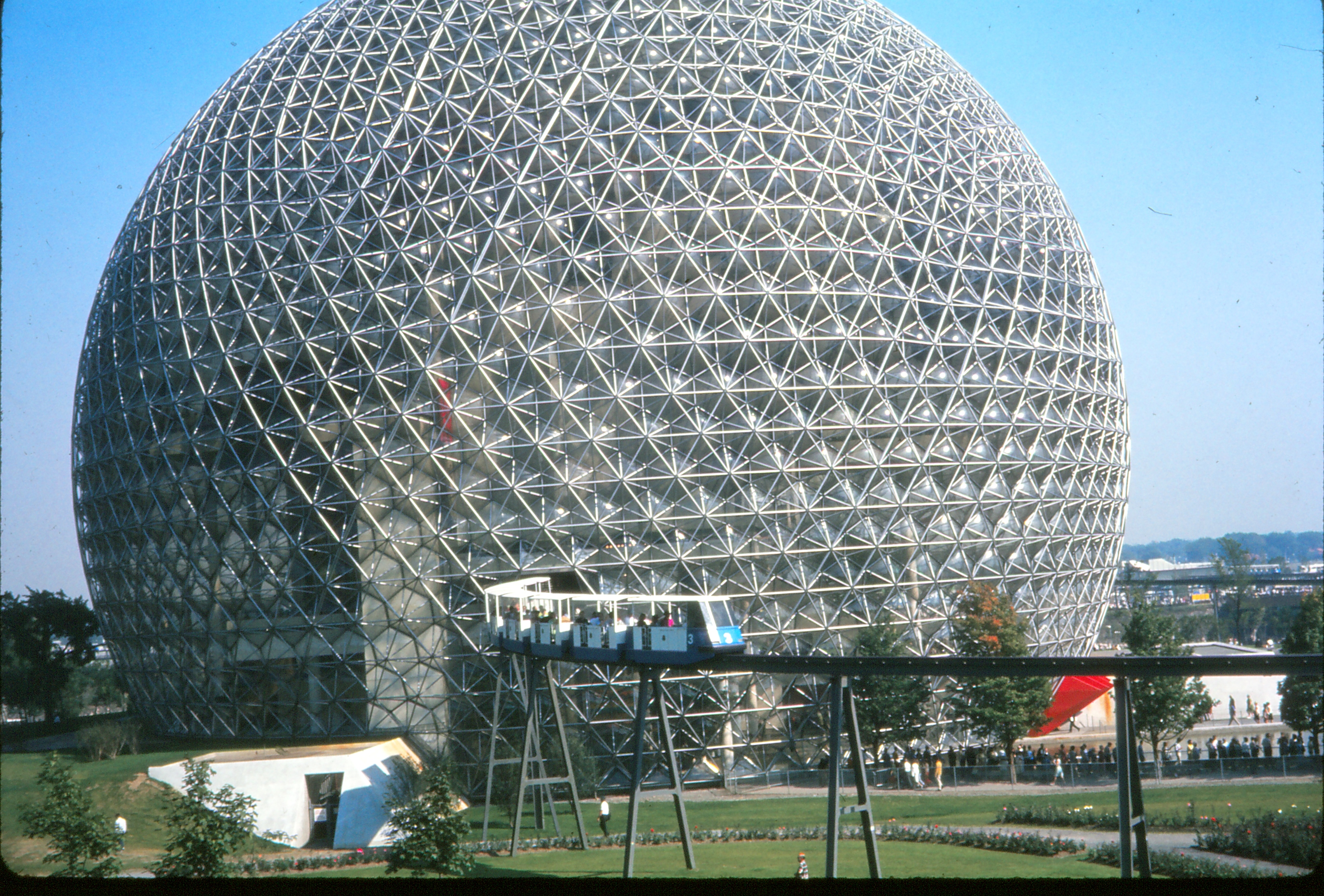
3rd most visited: USA Pavilion (with minirail)

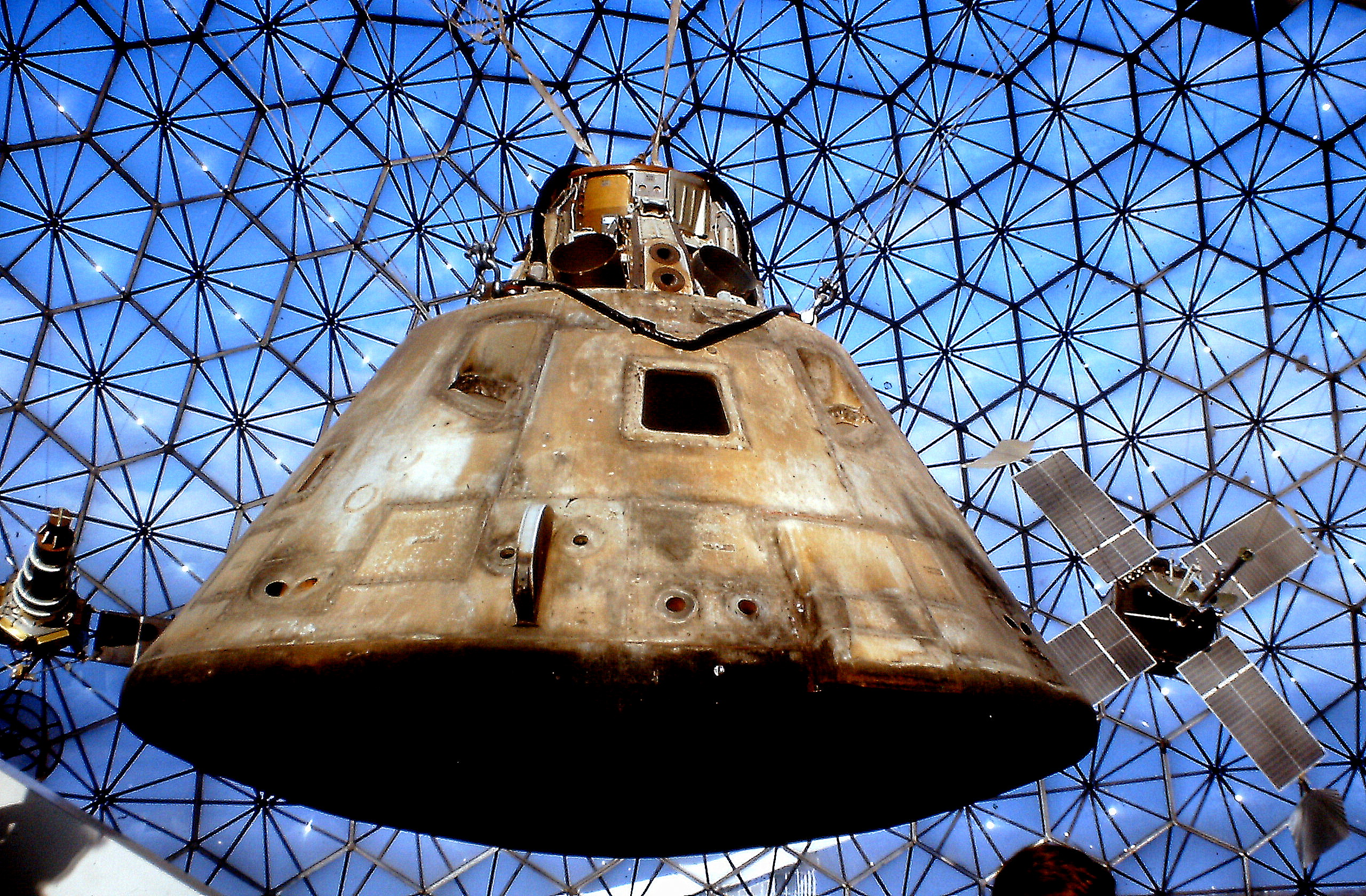
Apollo Command Module, inside USA Pavilion

- United States of America Pavilion - designed by Buckminster Fuller, the pavilion was the third most popular, with over 9 million visits. The building was distinguished by its large 20-story geodesic dome with an acrylic skin (which would catch fire and melt away in 1976). The Expo 67 minirail train passed through the building. Designed by Cambridge Seven Associates, the six levels of exhibits, connected by escalators, were based on the theme of: "Creative America - the positive use of creative energy". The exhibits included everything from American Folk Art and Elvis Presley's guitar to NASA’s Apollo Command Module and Lunar Excursion Module. But not everyone liked the pavilion, including US President Lyndon B. Johnson, who (after a brief visit) was alleged to have said "the homosexuals have had carte blanche!" in reference to the design and content of the displays. After Expo 67, the geodesic dome was repurposed to house the Biosphère.
- Venezuela
- West Germany (FRG) - Designed by Frei Otto, who later worked on the design of the Japanese Pavilion at Expo 2000
- Yugoslavia

== Theme pavilions ==
(From the Official Guide of Expo 67)

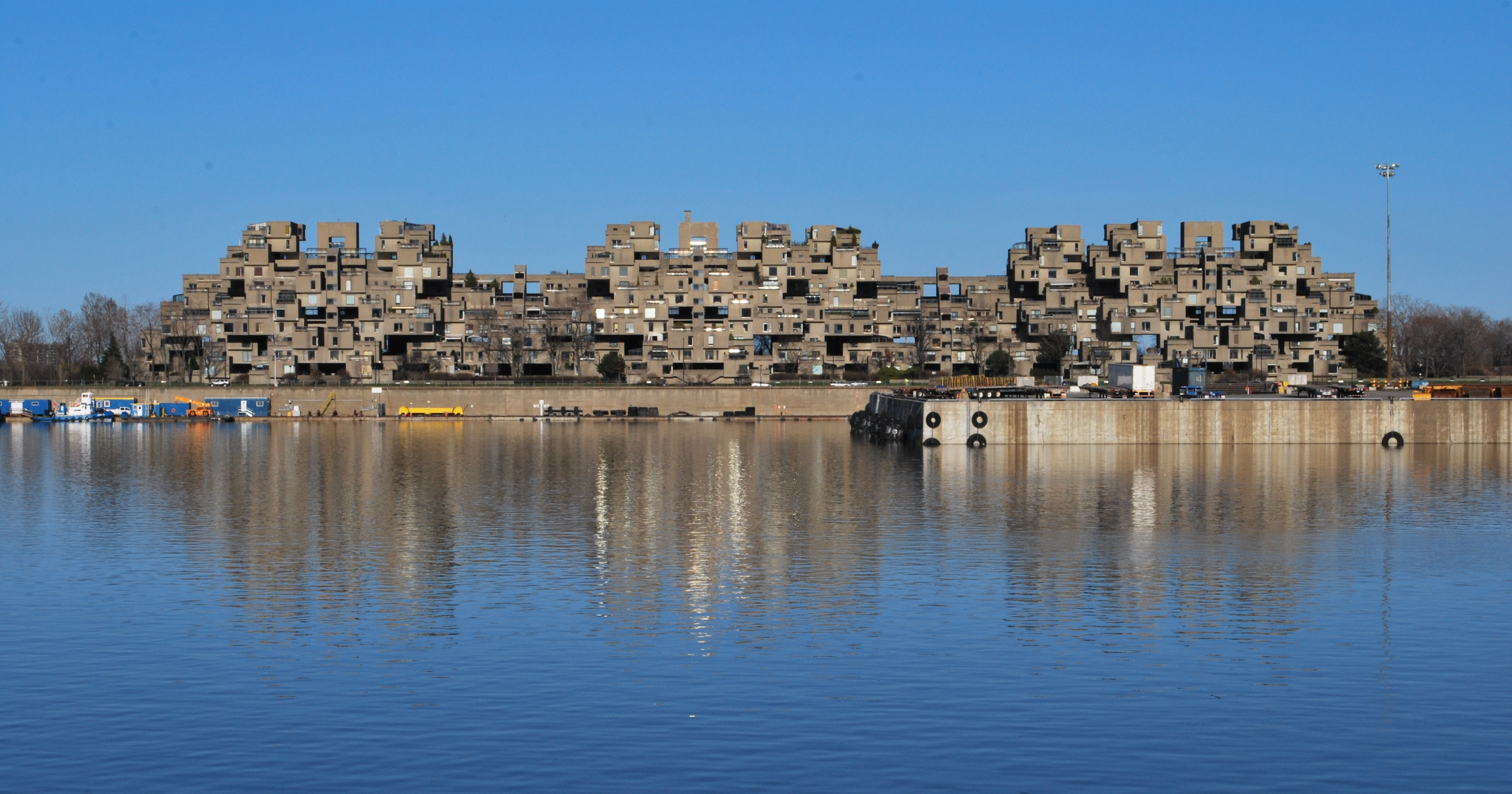
Habitat 67 one of the theme pavilions at Expo 67.

- Man the Explorer - Man and Life; Man his Planet and Space; Man and the Oceans; man and the Polar Regions; Man and his Health.
- Man the Producer - Resources for Man; Man in Control.
- Man the Creator - The Gallery of Fine Arts; Contemporary Sculpture; Industrial Design; Photography.
- Man in the Community - Seven displays relating Man to the urban life and his interdependence on others.
- Man the Provider - Agriculture.
- Labyrinth - A pavilion of functional architecture designed for the presentation of the multi-screen film In the Labyrinth.
- Habitat 67 - A novel construction project related to Man's housing needs.

== Privately-sponsored pavilions ==
- Air Canada
- Alcan Aquarium
- Bell Telephone Pavilion, also known as the "Telephone Pavilion". The pavilion's feature attraction was the exciting Walt Disney Imagineering Circle-Vision 360° documentary film Canada '67. From the Expo '67 Guide Book: "You're on centre stage for the RCMP Musical Ride... on centre ice for hockey... on the track at the Stampede! CIRCLE-VISION 360° surrounds you with all the fun and excitement of Canada's most thrilling events and its scenic beauty. And then, take your children to the Enchanted Forest... see exciting new communication services for the future... all in the Telephone Pavilion!" The pavilion also offered many of the public their first look at AT&T's state-of-the-art videophone called the Picturephone, the product of US$500 Million of research and development.
- Boy Scouts Pavilion
- Brewers Pavilion
- Canadian National Railway Pavilion
- Canadian Pacific - Cominco Pavilion
- Canadian Pulp and Paper Pavilion - 44 stylized tree tops created the unique roof, the tallest tree reaching 8 stories. Out front, guests were greeted by a stylized sculpture of a roll of paper being unwound. The sculpture had the attached meaning of: "(paper) the principal tool Man uses to record his thoughts". The trees were constructed with tongue and groove Douglas fir plywood (19 mm) over a steel frame. All of the trees had the same 4.9m^{2} base, but the height varied from 5 to 18 m. The plywood was coated with various shades of green epoxy paints. Over 9,300 m^{2} of plywood was used to build the roof.
- Chatelaine Magazine House
- Economic Progress Pavilion
- Christian Pavilion
- European Community Pavilion
- Hospitality Pavilion

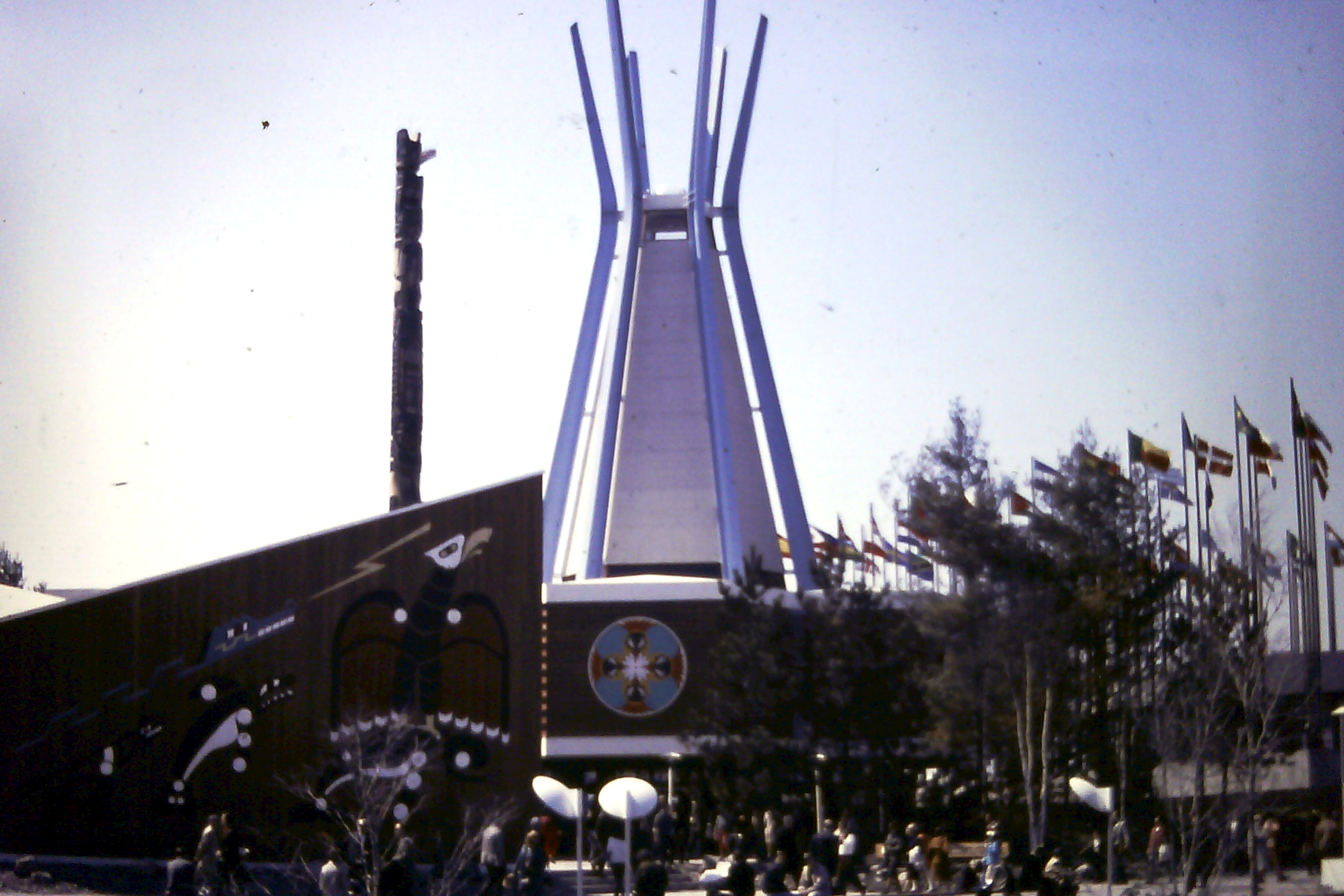
Indians of Canada pavilion.

- Indians of Canada - A pavilion devoted to the Indigenous people of Canada. It was one of the most controversial buildings as it included photos and works of art that depicted the difficulties faced by Indigenous people in Canada (such as on reserves, and issues raised with the use of Residential schools). It showcased the plight of Indigenous people before and after the arrival of European settlers, and explained at length how those European settlers needed the aid of Indigenous people in order to survive the harsh winters in Canada.
- Judaism Pavilion
- Kaleidoscope Pavilion
- Kodak Pavilion
- OEDC Pavilion
- Olympic House
- Place des Nations
- Polymer Pavilion
- Sermons from Science Pavilion
- United Nations Pavilion

== Provincial and state pavilions ==
- Atlantic Provinces: New Brunswick, Newfoundland, Nova Scotia, and Prince Edward Island shared the same pavilion building.
- Maine
- New York State

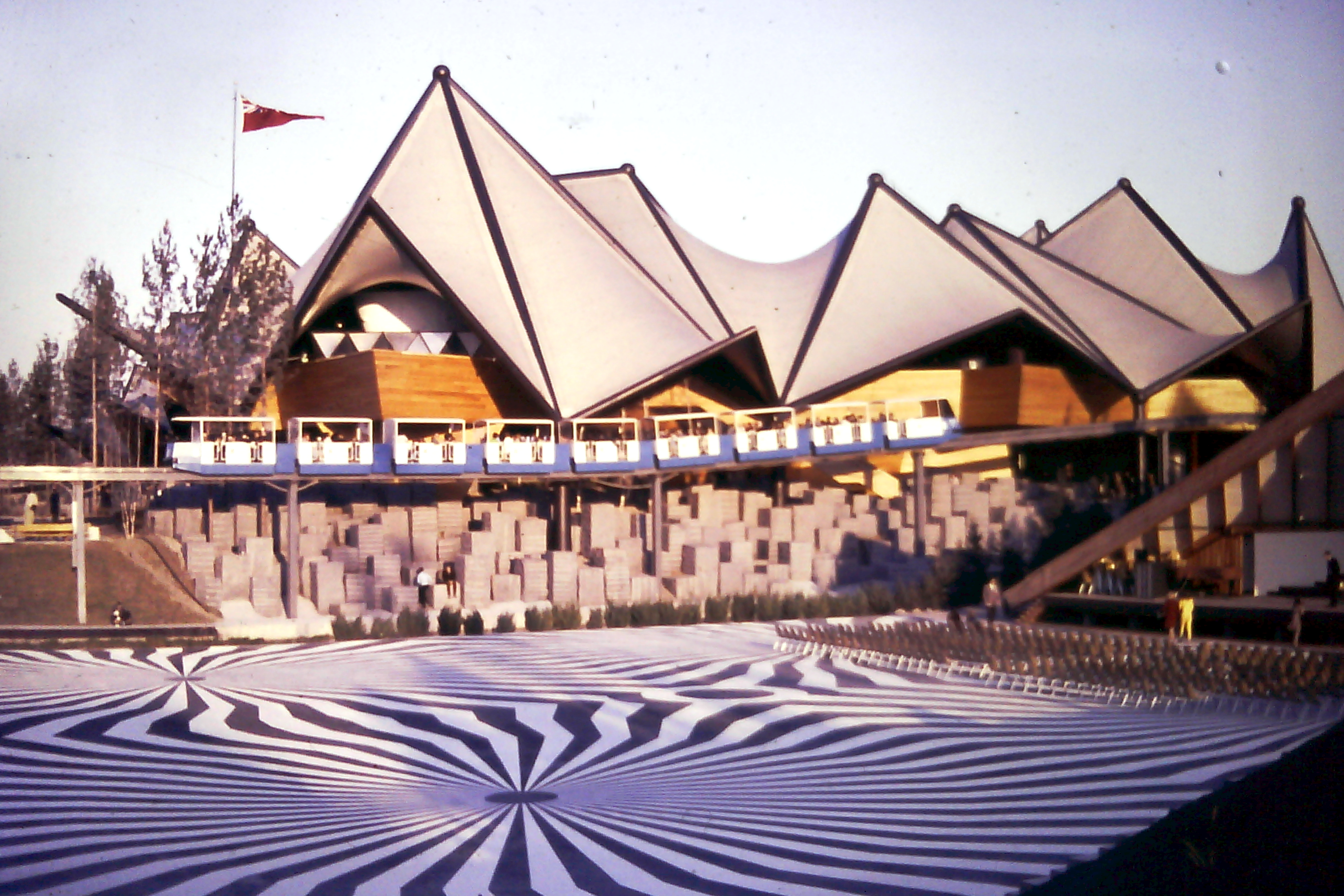
The Expo 67 Ontario pavilion

- Ontario: The fabric-roofed pavilion contained 16 bilingual exhibits, a 570-seat circular theatre with a 66 by 30 feet (20.1 m × 9.1 m) screen which played the 17-minute film A Place to Stand, which premiered the highly influential multi-dynamic image technique, and a large restaurant complex. The movie included the song "A Place to Stand, A Place to Grow", which became the unofficial theme song for the province. It was designed by Macy DuBois, who also worked with landscape architect Dick Strong on pavilion landscaping, featuring massive granite blocks.
- Quebec, designed by Papineau, Gérin-Lajoie, Le Blanc and Durand, architectes.
- Vermont
- Western Provinces: Alberta, British Columbia, Manitoba, and Saskatchewan all shared the same building space.

== Extant pavilions ==
Most of the pavilions were demolished in the years following Expo 67. The following are still extant in situ:

Pavilion	Current use
United States	Montreal Biosphere
Canada	Office of the Société du parc Jean-Drapeau, event space
France	Montreal Casino
Quebec	Montreal Casino
Jamaica	event space
Korea	vacant
Tunisia	vacant
Place des Nations	vacant
Habitat 67 (theme pavilion)	Habitat 67 condominium complex
Alcan	La Ronde; Marine Circus: vacant (previously Nintendo Mégadôme); Main Aquarium: mostly demolished; remnant used as Route 67 group space
Man the Creator (theme pavilion)	owned by Loto-Québec
Administration and Press Pavilion	Port of Montreal headquarters
Expo-théâtre	MELS Cinema Studios

The following pavilions were removed and reassembled elsewhere:

- The USSR pavilion was moved to Moscow and exists today as the Moscow Pavilion at the All-Russia Exhibition Centre.
- The Czechoslovak government donated its pavilion to the government of the province of Newfoundland as a gesture of gratitude for rescue efforts following the crash of ČSA Flight 523 at Gander International Airport on September 5, 1967, during Expo. The pavilion was moved to Grand Falls-Windsor, Newfoundland, where it remains in use as the Gordon Pinsent Centre for the Arts.
- The Yugoslavian pavilion was purchased for $1 and moved to Grand Bank, Newfoundland and Labrador, where it was reopened in 1971 as the Provincial Seamen's Museum.
- The Jeunesses Musicales du Canada pavilion was moved to Orford, Quebec, where it stands on the Orford Musique campus.

== See also ==
- Expo 67 (opening week)
- List of world's fairs
- Expo Express, a mass transit rail system built exclusively to service Expo 67, running from Place d'Accueil on Cité du Havre to Île Notre-Dame.
- A Place to Stand, A Place to Grow
- A Centennial Song
- 1967 in Canada
- 1976 Summer Olympics, also held in Montreal, using part of the Expo 67 site.
- Expo '86, held in Vancouver
- Ontario Place, a Toronto park created in the 1970s to mimic Expo 67.
- Canadian National Exhibition and the Pacific National Exhibition, held annually
