= O Canada! (film) =

Attraction at Canada Pavilion at Epcot

O' Canada!
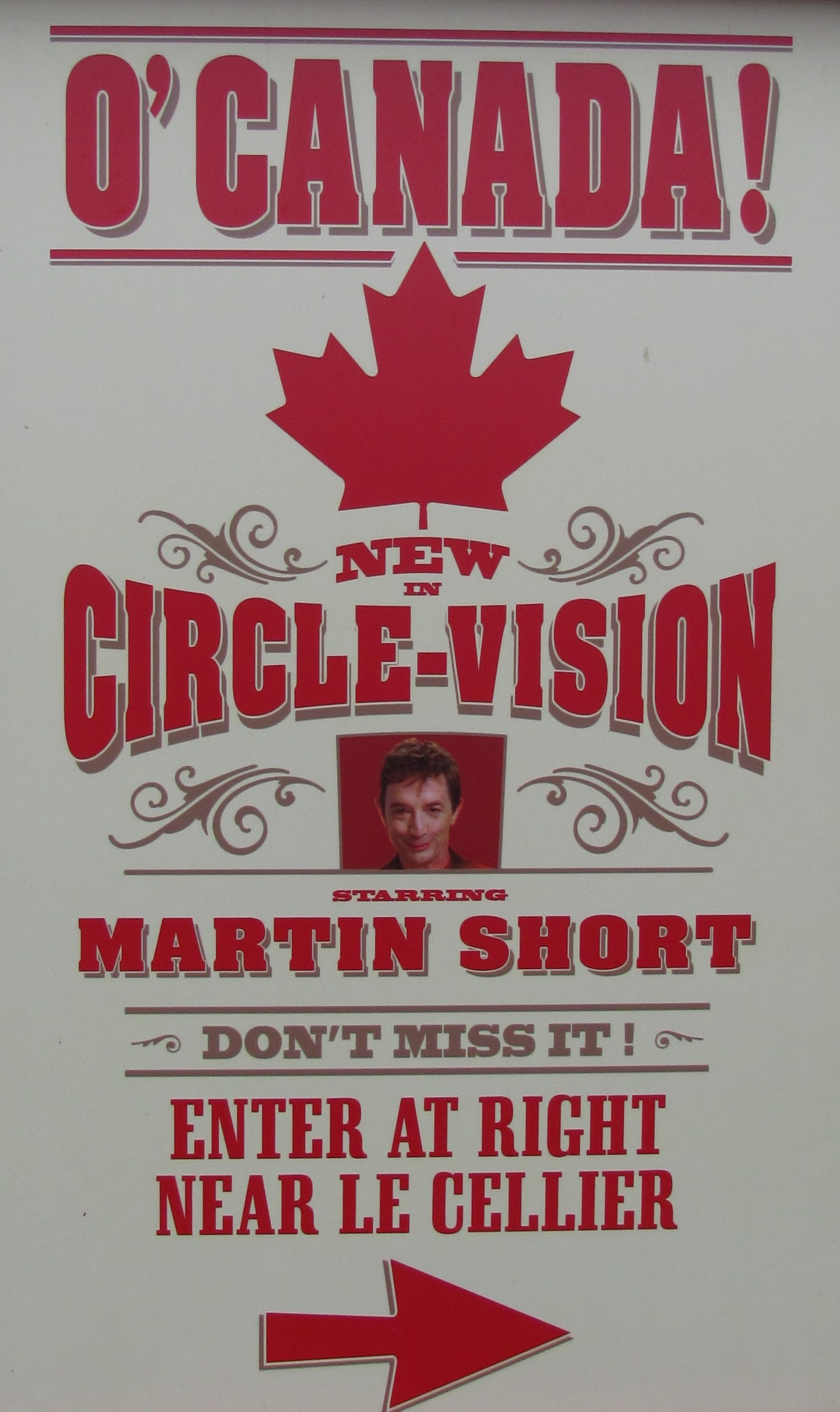

Epcot
- Area: Canada Pavilion (World Showcase)
- Status: Removed
- Opening date: October 1, 1982 (original); September 1, 2007 (updated)
- Closing date: August 6, 2007 (original); August 1, 2019 (updated)
- Replaced by: Canada Far and Wide

Ride statistics
- Attraction type: Circle-Vision 360° film
- Designer: WED Enterprises
- Model: 360° theatre
- Theme: Canadian sights
- Music: Bruce Broughton (score; 2007–2019) "Canada (You're a Lifetime Journey)", performed by Eva Avila (2007–2019)
- Audience capacity: 610 per show
- Duration: 13:53
- Host: Corey Burton (1982–2007); Martin Short (2007–2019)
- Wheelchair accessible
- Assistive listening available

O Canada! was a Circle-Vision 360° film attraction at the Canada Pavilion, within Epcot's World Showcase at the Walt Disney World Resort in Florida. Its name derives from Canada's national anthem. It showcases many images of Canada's cities and sights, including Quebec, Ontario, the Royal Canadian Mounted Police's Musical Ride, the Calgary Stampede, Vancouver and Vancouver Harbour, the Ottawa River, and more.

The movie was filmed mostly during 1981 and has been in continuous exhibition since that time, with an updated version released in 2007. It closed on August 1, 2019, and was later replaced by a new Canadian Circle-Vision film titled Canada Far and Wide.

== History ==
The attraction was inspired by the popular Circle-Vision 360° documentary film Canada '67, shown at the Telephone pavilion during Expo 67, created by Canadian film director Robert Barclay. The Disney version was described by Barclay as "a superficial, glib look at the country".

The following excerpt shows the similarities between the two films: the official Expo '67 Guide Book described some of the Canada '67 documentary film's many scenes: "You're on centre stage for the RCMP Musical Ride... on centre ice for hockey... on the track at the Stampede! CIRCLE-VISION 360° surrounds you with all the fun and excitement of Canada's most thrilling events and its scenic beauty".

Footage for the RCMP Musical Ride was shot in Rockcliffe Park, located between the Rockcliffe Parkway and Hillsdale Road in the village of Rockcliffe Park and not at the RCMP stables located close by on Sandridge Rd.

The Canada '67 film also presented a bobsled hurtling down a steep ice track at the Quebec Winter Carnival, along with many other events and scenes iconic to the country. Viewers in the audience occasionally experienced vertigo after one particularly dramatic sequence filmed over Niagara Falls.

=== Scenes (original version) ===
1. People of the Maritime Provinces
2. People of Québec
3. People of Ontario
4. People of Manitoba and Saskatchewan
5. People of the west and far north
6. Royal Canadian Mounted Police at Rockcliffe Park, Ottawa
7. Gulf Island, British Columbia
8. Rose Blanche-Harbor le Cou, Newfoundland
9. River in Saint Martins, New Brunswick
10. Bluenose II in Lunenberg, Nova Scotia
11. Bluenose II deck
12. Bluenose II in the Bay of Fundy
13. Birdseye view of Montréal
14. Place Jacques Cartier in Old Town Montréal
15. Inside of Notre Dame Cathedral, Montréal
16. Algonquin Provincial Park
17. Canadian wildlife
18. Reindeer on Tuktoyaktuk Peninsula, Northwest Territories
19. Calgary Stampede
20. Bridge over Kananaskis River, Alberta
21. Bow River, Alberta
22. Banff Springs Hôtel
23. Bow River Rapids
24. Kananaskis Valley, Alberta
25. Skiers in Bugaboo Provincial Park, British Columbia
26. Quebec City in winter, Plains of Abraham, Citadel and Chateau Frontenac
27. Toboggan run near Chateau Frontenac, Quebec City
28. Ice sports in Ottawa, Ontario
29. Rideau Canal, Ottawa
30. Canadian National Tower, Toronto
31. Vancouver, British Columbia
32. Harbor at Victoria, British Columbia
33. Ottawa River; Rideau Canal
34. Changing of the Guard in front of Parliament
35. Bagpipe bands at Canadian National Exhibition
36. Ukrainian dancers
37. Fifes and drums at Old Fort Henry, Ontario
38. Royal Canadian Air Force Snowbirds squadron
39. Kaskawulsh Glacier, Yukon Territory
40. Kananaskis Valley
41. Wheat field in Saskatchewan
42. Farmland of Prince Edward Island
43. Thousands Islands Bridge over St. Lawrence River
44. Aerial shot over Alberta Prairie
45. Salmon fisherman near Campbell River, British Columbia
46. Sunset over Mackenzie River Delta, Northwest Territories
47. Snow geese on lake
48. St. Lawrence River in Quebec City
49. Night skiing at Mont Tremblant
50. Rapids of Ottawa River
51. Stanley Park, British Columbia
52. Vancouver Harbor
53. Butchart Gardens, British Columbia
54. Snowy peaks in Kananaskis Valley, British Columbia
55. Victoria, British Columbia
56. Giant firs at Cathedral Grove, British Columbia
57. Mackenzie River Delta, Northwest territories

=== 2007 update ===
On August 6, 2007, the original exhibition of O' Canada! closed. Month later, on September 1, the new Circle-Vision 360 film debuted at the Canada Pavilion, made in part in response to a seven-year campaign by the Canadian Tourism Commission due to a steady stream of complaints over the years about the dated representation of Canada. O' Canada is primarily narrated by Martin Short, after he makes the original narrator (Corey Burton) angry enough to quit during an argument over the latter's inaccurate portrayal of Canada.

The newer version of O' Canada! includes updated footage of Canada's cities and natural features, including Niagara Falls and a new orchestral score by Bruce Broughton. The song "Canada (You're a Lifetime Journey)" has been re-recorded by Eva Avila, the winner of the fourth season of Canadian Idol.

This version of the attraction closed on August 1, 2019, for a new updated film.

== See also ==
- O Canada: the national anthem of Canada.
- Canada '67 (film)
- Bell Canada Pavilion (Expo 67)
- Circle-Vision 360°
