= Flight 523 =

Flight 523 may refer to:

- ČSA Flight 523, crashed on 5 September 1967
- Caribbean Airlines Flight 523 crashed on 30 July 2011
- Delta Air Lines Flight 523, attempted hijacking and assassination on 22 February 1974
