= Canada Pavilion at Epcot =

Pavilion of World Showcase in Epcot

Coordinates: 28.3715°N 81.5513°W

Canada (EPCOT)

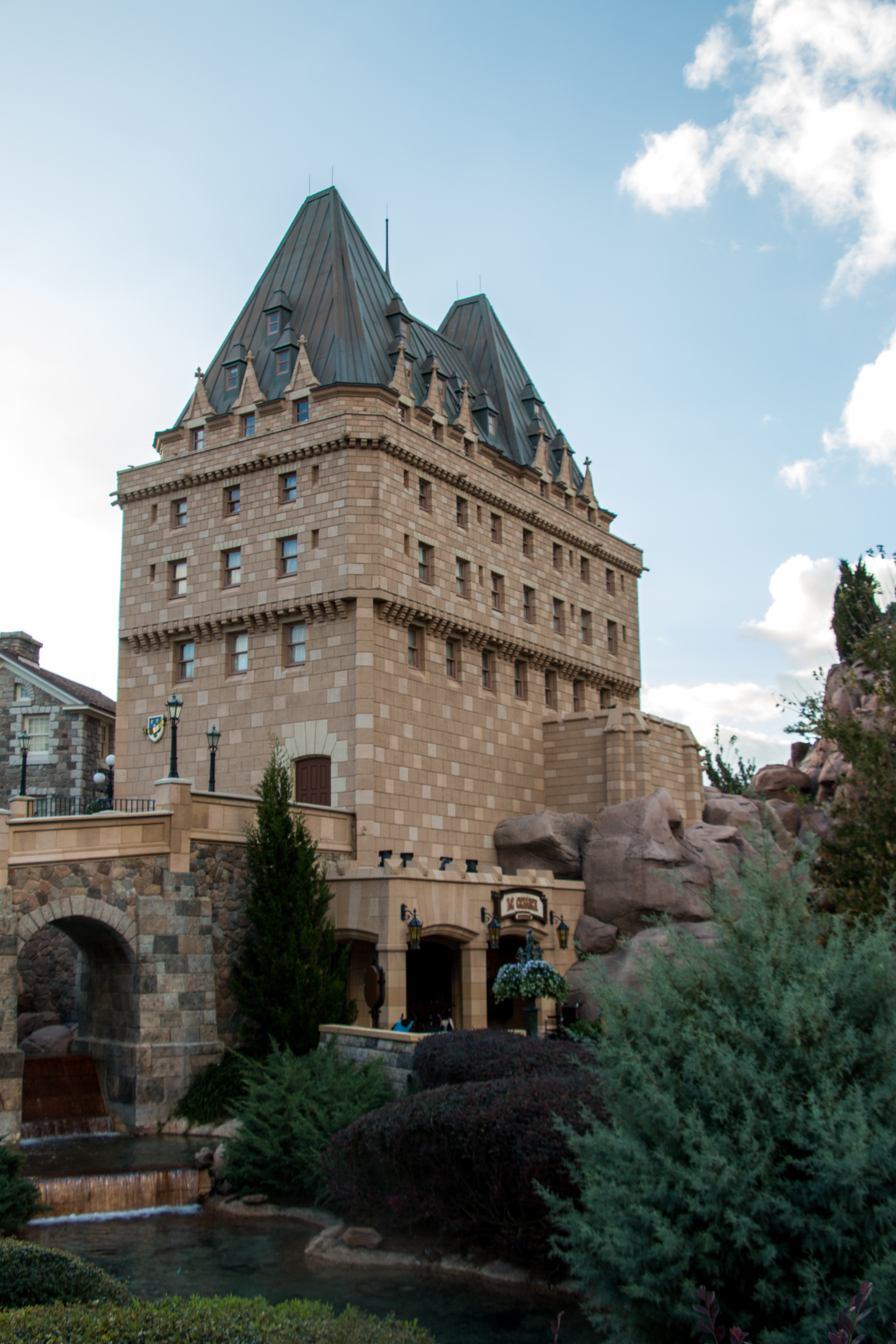

EPCOT
- Area: World Showcase
- Status: Operating
- Opening date: October 1, 1982

Ride statistics
- Attraction type: Themed pavilion
- Theme: Canadian countryside

Canada is a cultural pavilion representing the country of the same name as part of the World Showcase area of EPCOT at the Walt Disney World Resort near Orlando, Florida. It is located next to the United Kingdom pavilion at the northern end of World Showcase Lagoon.

== Layout ==
The Canada Pavilion is designed to remind guests of Canada's natural beauty. It includes a canyon, a waterfall, gardens, a pool with fountains, and totem poles. Further in to the pavilion, beyond the rustic log cabins, a small thoroughfare is designed to represent the British and French influences and heritage through its buildings; the Hotel du Canada dominates the skyline to the right whilst English cottages adorn the left. An iconic Gilbert-Scott telephone box stands to the side, and often there is a direct connection on this phone to the boxes in the United Kingdom pavilion nearby.

The main attraction is O Canada, a Circle-Vision 360° movie of Canada's cities, scenery, and people. The pavilion also includes Le Cellier Steakhouse and the former home of the Celtic rock band Off Kilter. North American animal characters from Brother Bear (Kenai and Koda) and Pocahontas (Meeko and Percy) used to make the occasional appearances to patrons, but have been absent from the pavilion for a few years.

== Attraction history ==
Prior to the construction of the pavilion, the Walt Disney Company sought financial support for the attraction from the Canadian government. The company wanted the federal government to fund the cost of building the attraction; in return the government would have input into the design and layout. The Canadian government was concerned about the stereotype of Canada that Disney wanted (i.e., lumberjacks). Funding was refused, and Disney threatened to pull the exhibit, but ultimately did not.

At one time during the planning, the entire pavilion was to have been divided by a main street of shops and restaurants, with one side representing French Canada and the other English Canada. Today this is somewhat evident as a small thoroughfare.

At the opening in 1982, the original musical talent for the Canadian pavilion was a trio called the "Caledonian Pipe Band", consisting of two pipers and one drummer. The performers were Robert (Bob) Proctor (lead, drummer), Kenneth Mauchin (piper) and Robert Mauchin (piper). They were recruited by Ron Rodriguez (talent co-ordinator for Walt Disney World) from the Rosie O'Grady's Pipe Band of Orlando. Because all three had ties to Scotland, they also performed in the British pavilion at various times.

In 2007, Disney updated the movie O Canada!, filmed in 1979. For several years, the Canadian Tourism Commission lobbied to have the movie updated, partly to remove outdated stereotypes of Canadian life. On August 31, 2007, the updated edition opened with a new host, Canadian actor Martin Short, and Canadian Idol winner Eva Avila reprising the original film's theme song, "Canada (You're a Lifetime Journey)".

The attraction closed in late 2019 to make adjustments for the new update; Canada Far and Wide, which opened in 2020. On March 25, 2025, following the announcement, since Hotel du Canada as the old space was permanently closed, Disney Vacation Club announced that the opening of the first in-park Welcome Home Center, called Château de Voyage, as the new space, in the Canada pavilion, which was opened on April 20, 2025. This new space serves as a Disney Vacation Club Welcome Home Center, where guests can learn about DVC memberships and tour a model room of the Island Tower at Disney's Polynesian Villas & Bungalows. In June 2026, since Refreshment Port in EPCOT's World Showcase, are now permanently closed on January 12, 2026, it was announced that a new dining space called La Poutinerie, sponsored by Air Canada, which will be open on July 1, 2026 in Canada Pavilion at EPCOT, in the time for Canada Day, and the menu have been revealed.

== Attractions and services ==
=== Attraction ===
- Canada: Far and Wide Circle-Vision film (under seasonal operation)

=== Dining ===
- Le Cellier Steakhouse provides sit down restaurant service. The interior is to give the impression of a wine cellar as its name suggests. Food offerings include seafood and steaks, along with popular Canadian wines and beer. It is located in the main building of the pavilion, Hotel du Canada modeled after the Château Laurier hotel in Ottawa. The building is presented (with the aid of forced perspective) to look as if it is six stories in height, but is really three. The restaurant was originally a cafeteria-style dining hall. It actually is a cellar, located underneath the chateau; it was designed to appear as a wine cellar, with simulated stone arches and dark ambient lighting.
- Popcorn Cart sells popcorn, soda, Moosehead Lager, La Fin Du Monde on draft and Labatt's Blue and Blue Light in bottle pour.
- La Poutinerie (Opening on July 1, 2026)

=== Shopping ===
- Northwest Mercantile sells wilderness themed Christmas ornaments, a variety of animal plush, maple syrup, and a selection of Canadian wines and ice wines. It is located in the trading post building, which is designed to look like a traditional West coast native longhouse.
- The Wood Cart (located on the promenade) sells a variety of animal plush, flags and other assorted goods. The Cart also features an engraving stand, where guests can have their names engraved onto genuine leather bracelets, cuffs, and Disney character keychains.

=== Entertainment ===
- Canadian Holiday Voyagers Began December 1, 2015
- Alberta Bound is a performance of Canadian country, folk and popular music which began May 1, 2016.

=== Totem poles ===
The pavilion opened with two North west coast Indigenous totem poles totem poles, up to 30' (9 metres) in height constructed of fibreglass. Designed by Disney Imagineering, the icons used did not represent any specific nation but rather tried to capture the spirit of the Indigenous peoples of Canada's west coast.

In 1998, the park decided to add a third on, this time using wood so as to be more "authentic". It was carved by the Alaskan artist David A. Boxley in front of guests over a two-month period and was officially put on display in April 1998. The third totem pole depicts three stories of the Raven tricking the Sky Chief into the release of sun, moon and stars from a chest. Then, in 2017, Disney commissioned Boxley to create two more poles to replace the original fibreglass ones.

=== Gardens ===
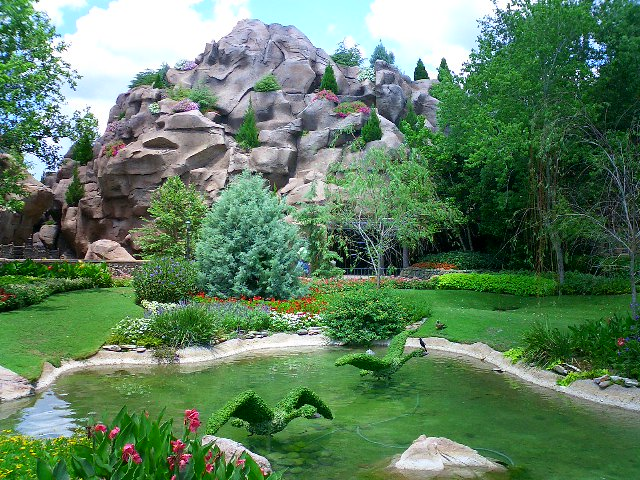
Gardens at the Canada Pavilion

The Victoria Gardens which are adjacent to the Hotel du Canada are inspired by the Butchart Gardens near Victoria, British Columbia. The gardens are the largest (and most labour-intensive) of all the national pavilions.

=== Hidden Mickeys ===
The Canada Pavilion contains two Hidden Mickeys:

1. Just outside Northwest Mercantile, there is the largest totem pole in the Canada Pavilion. The Mickey is just underneath the elbow of a set of arms near the top of the pole.
2. Just inside Le Cellier steakhouse there is the counter where one would check in for their meal. Behind that counter is a small wine storage room. In the very top center of the rack are three bottles of wine, a large one with two small ones on top of it forming a familiar shape.

The Hidden Mickey that was on the fish in the Mercantile was created by cast members in 2002 and removed in 2019. An updated fish created by an artist from Dieppe, New Brunswick received approval by Disney Imagineering and was placed in 2023.

== Former attractions and services ==
=== Dining ===
- Le Cellier Cafeteria (became Le Cellier Steakhouse)
- La Boutique des Provinces (located in Hotel du Canada) sells Anne of Green Gables gifts, Blue Mountain pottery, along with various handcrafted souvenirs.
- Beaver Tails kiosk cart, which sold BeaverTails goods. (Closed in 2005 and cart removed in late 2006).

=== Films ===
- Portraits of Canada / Images du Canada – played for a short period after its debut at the Telecom Canada pavilion at Expo 86 in Vancouver.
- Canada 67
- O Canada!

=== Entertainment ===
- Off Kilter is a Celtic rock band which debuted at the Canada Pavilion July 1, 1997, and closed in 2014.
- Canadian Lumberjacks debuted in Fall 2014 – Ended November 30, 2015
