= Canada '67 =

1967 film by Robert Barclay

- Directed by: Robert Barclay
- Production company: Walt Disney Productions
- Release date: 1967
- Running time: 22 minutes
- Country: Canada

Canada '67 is a Circle-Vision 360° documentary film by Canadian film director Robert Barclay, which was presented at the Telephone Pavilion (formally named the Telephone Association of Canada Pavilion), part of Expo 67, an International World's Fair held in Montreal, Quebec, Canada in 1967 to mark the centenary of the Confederation of Canada.

The telephone pavilion was created to promote telephone companies and their services, but its main feature was the Canada '67 film produced by Walt Disney Productions and presented in a large, completely circular movie theatre.

== Description ==
The official Expo '67 Guide Book described some of the documentary's many scenes: "You're on centre stage for the RCMP Musical Ride... on centre ice for hockey... on the track at the Stampede! CIRCLE-VISION 360° surrounds you with all the fun and excitement of Canada's most thrilling events and its scenic beauty".

Directed by Canadian filmmaker Robert Barclay, the film also presented a bobsled hurtling down a steep ice track at the Quebec Winter Carnival, along with many other events and scenes iconic to the country. Viewers in the audience occasionally experienced vertigo after one particularly dramatic sequence filmed over Niagara Falls.

== Production and exhibition ==
The film was commissioned by the Telephone Association of Canada and produced by Walt Disney Productions. A converted B-25 bomber rebuilt by Paul Mantz's Tallmantz Aviation film unit was used to capture the aerial shots. The film was one of the rarest Circle-Vision movies ever exhibited; it has not been exhibited since the conclusion of the World's Fair in 1967, except for a brief appearance in January 1974 at Disney's Magic Kingdom during its Salute to Canada. The film also served as the inspiration for the subsequent O Canada! movie that has played at Disney's Epcot Center since 1982.

The film cameras, nine of them arranged in a circle to record a 360° view, were assembled in a uniquely designed 400 pounds (180 kg) frame to allow for precise filming while the multiple movie camera rig was suspended from a converted B-25 bomber plus various boats and vehicles. A four-person production team shot about 60 miles (97 km) of 35 mm colour film over a 10-month period.

The finished film showed 80 separate scenes, presented to audiences of about 1,200–1,500 viewers per showing, every 30 minutes. In typical Disney World theme park style, one set of doors permitted the audience to enter the theatre's viewing area which was divided into narrow 'strips' and which had no seating – viewers stood for the entire performance or could lean on the solid guide rails positioned between the strips. When each film showing was complete the audience would keep walking straight forward to exit via a second set of doors on the opposite side of the theatre entrance. The continuous flow-through design allowed for the maximum of viewers with only minimal delays between showings.

The 360° wrap-around theatre used nine 35mm Simplex X-L projectors, one for each of the film cameras, with each one projecting a 40° wide image onto a completely circular screen in order to produce a 360° view. The screens were 23 feet (7.0 m) in height, with a 273 feet (83 m) circumference, positioned 7 feet (2.1 m) above floor level.

Twelve powerful stereo speakers were suspended above the top of the screens, and which played the English and French commentary, sound effects and a specially composed musical score. The audio tracks were recorded on two separate six-channel 35mm magnetic tape media.

== Data ==
- Runtime & film stock: 18 minutes (22 minutes with credits), 35mm, color
- Grand opening: April 28, 1967
- Closed: October 29, 1967
- Designer: Walt Disney Imagineering
- Location: Telephone Pavilion, Expo 67, Montreal
- Formal Name of Attraction: "Canada '67"
- Film negative format (mm/video inches): 9 x 35 mm
- Cinematographic process: Circle-Vision 360°
- Printed film format: 9 x 35 mm
- Aspect ratio: 12.00 : 1 (sic)

== See also ==
- List of American films of 1967
- O Canada! (film)
- Expo 67
- Circle-Vision 360°
- Canada: Far and Wide
