= Kaleidoscope (Expo 67) =

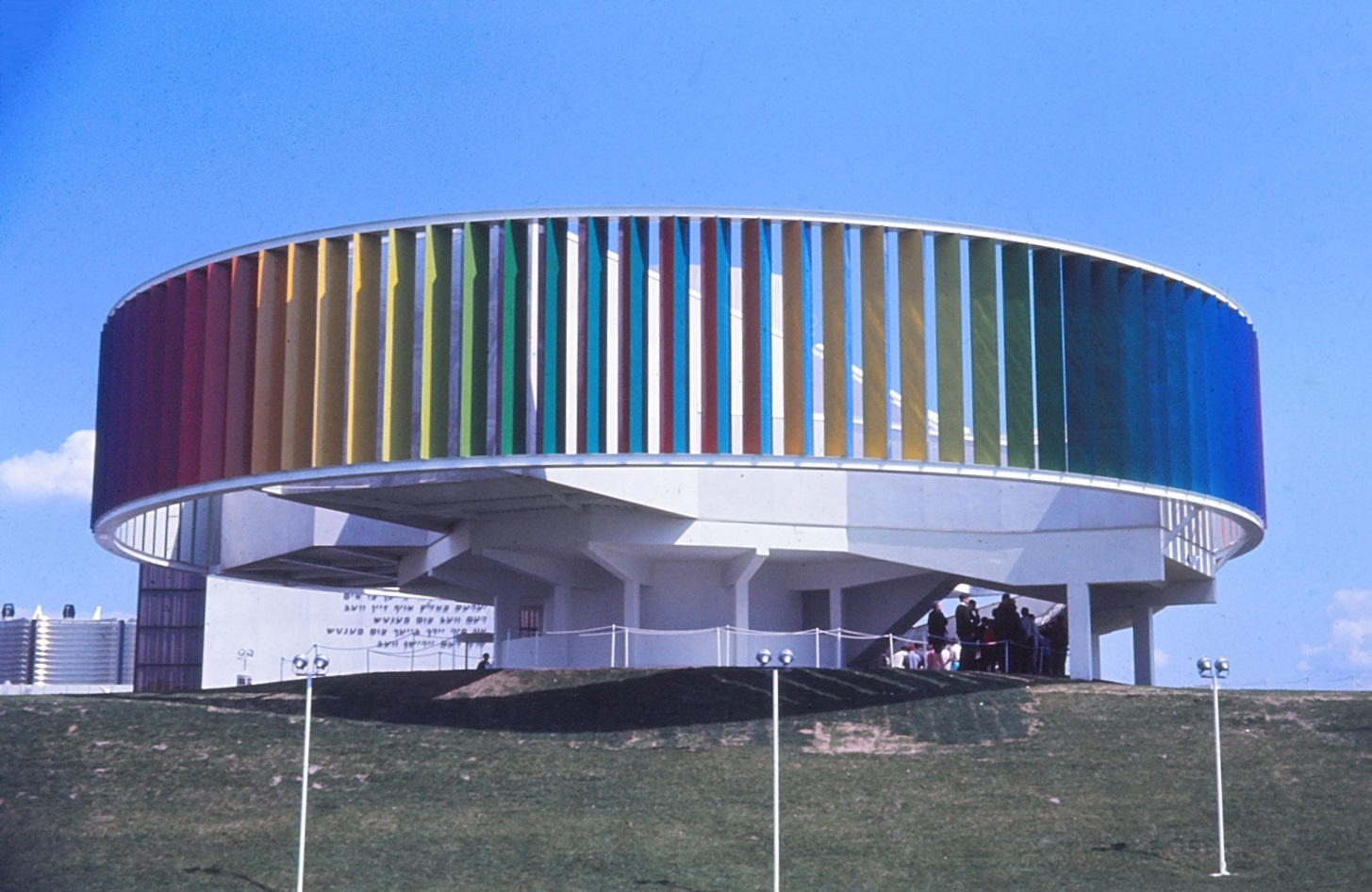
Kaleidoscope Pavilion

The Kaleidoscope Pavilion was a sponsored pavilion at Expo 67, the International World's Fair held in Montreal, Quebec, Canada in 1967.

== Theme ==
Designed to reflect a color-based theme, the pavilion acted as an oversized, three-dimensional color wheel. Built in the shape of a carousel, it featured 112 colored fins that created the illusion the structure was moving as spectators moved across the Expo grounds. The interior of the pavilion consisted of a 12-minute film titled Man and Color that was projected on oversized screens. Shown over the course of three differently designed rooms, mirrors were used to create an abstract, reflection-driven experience of color. Music for the exhibit was composed by R. Murray Schafer.

== Creators ==
Sponsored by six Canadian chemical companies, the pavilion was designed by members of the University of Waterloo’s Institute of Design and Morley Markson and Associates, a Toronto-based industrial design firm. The project director was University of Waterloo professor Vir Handa.
