= ČSA Flight 523 =

1967 aviation accident in Newfoundland and Labrador, Canada

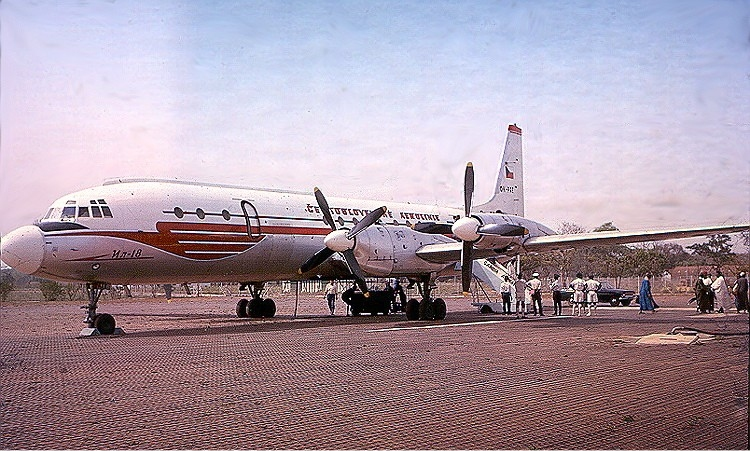
- A ČSA Il-18V similar to the accident aircraft

Accident
- Date: 5 September 1967
- Summary: Failure to climb for undetermined reason, striking obstructions and impacting the ground
- Site: Gander Airport, Gander, Newfoundland and Labrador, Canada; 48°56′32.45″N 54°32′2.03″W

Aircraft
- Aircraft type: Ilyushin Il-18D
- Operator: ČSA (Československé Státní Aerolinie)
- Registration: OK-WAI
- Flight origin: Praha-Ruzyne International Airport (PRG/LKPR), Czechoslovakia
- 1st stopover: Shannon Airport (SNN/EINN), Ireland
- Last stopover: Gander Airport (YQX/CYQX), Gander, Canada
- Destination: Havana-José Martí International Airport (HAV/MUHA), Cuba
- Occupants: 69
- Passengers: 61
- Crew: 8
- Fatalities: 35
- Survivors: 34

ČSA Flight 523, operated by an Ilyushin Il-18D, was a scheduled flight from Prague Ruzyně International Airport (PRG/LKPR), Czechoslovakia to Havana via Shannon Airport and Gander International Airport, with 69 people on board, on 5 September 1967 it crashed on climb-out from Gander.

== Crash ==
On 5 September 1967, ČSA Flight 523 crashed on climb-out from Gander International Airport, after being re-fuelled for the final leg of the flight. The aircraft took off from runway 14 climbing at an abnormally shallow angle. The aircraft struck a supporting wire of a mast, climbed to 40 m (130 ft), then started to dive, hitting the ground at a speed of approximately 360 km/h (220 mph; 190 kn), hit a railway embankment 4,000 ft (1,200 m) past the end of the runway, caught fire and broke into pieces. Four crewmen and 33 passengers were killed. The aircraft was new, manufactured in April 1967, having flown only 766 hours. The crew, replaced by a fresh one in Gander, consisted of a captain with over 17,000 hours experience (over 5,000 on the Il-18), familiar with the airport as he had been flying there since 1962, and a co-pilot with over 10,000 hours experience.

== Investigation ==
The investigation of the incident started immediately; Czechoslovak and Soviet experts, including Genrikh Novozhilov from Ilyushin and the Czech World War II fighter pilot František Fajtl, also took part in it. Several possibilities were discussed but the cause of the accident was never determined.

== Memorials ==
As the accident occurred during Expo 67 in Montreal, the Czechoslovak government afterwards donated its Expo pavilion to the government of Newfoundland as a gesture of gratitude for rescue efforts following the crash. The pavilion was moved to Grand Falls-Windsor, Newfoundland, where it was opened in 1971. It remains in use as the Gordon Pinsent Centre for the Arts.

In 2015 a memorial plaque was unveiled in Gander to honour the crash victims.
