= Telephone Pavilion (Expo 67) =

Building in Montreal, Quebec

Coordinates: 45.51090°N 73.53336°W

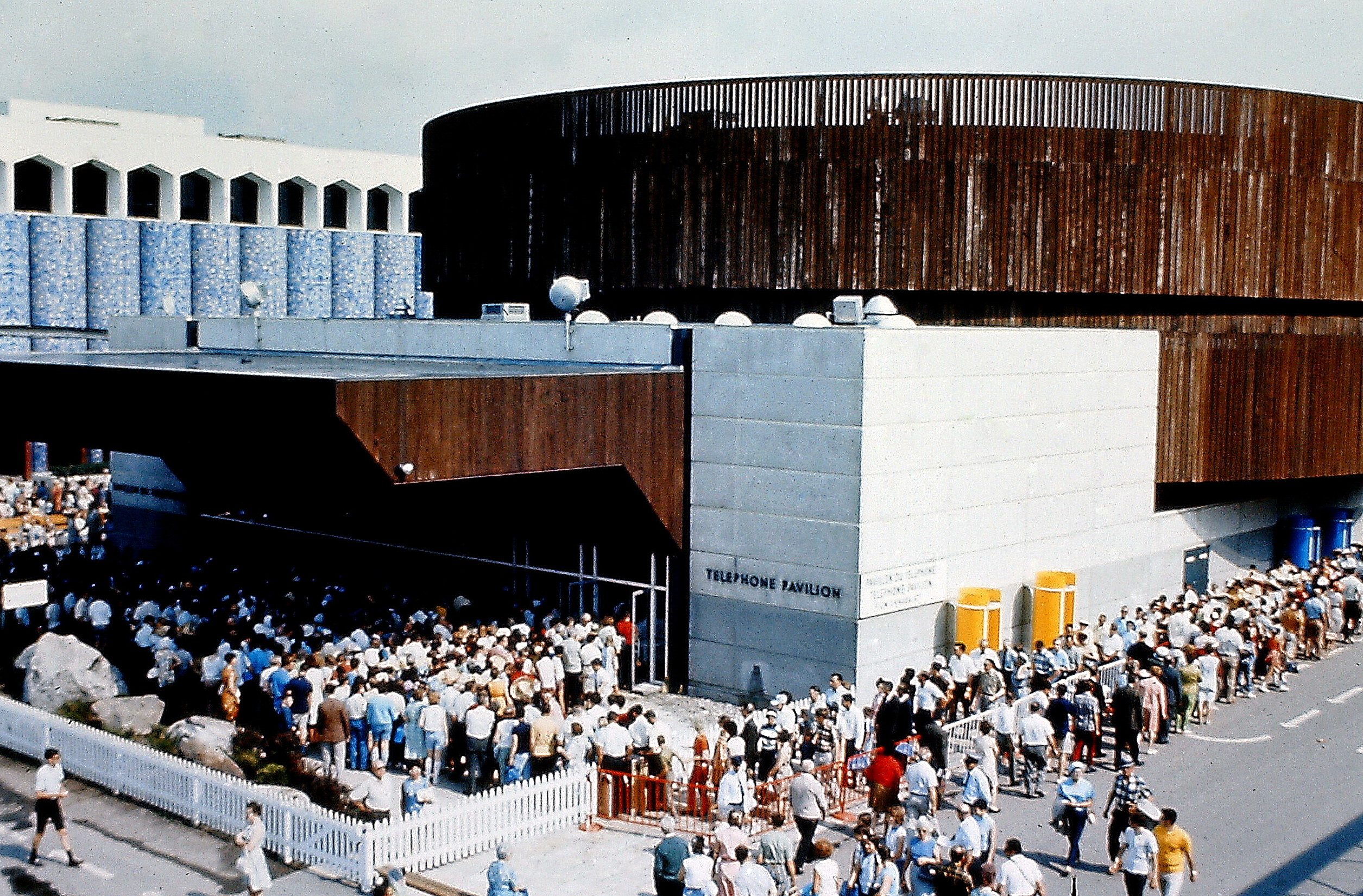
The Telephone Pavilion

The Telephone Pavilion, also known as the Bell Telephone Pavilion and formally named the Telephone Association of Canada Pavilion, was a part of Expo 67, an International World's Fair held in Montreal, Quebec, Canada in 1967 to mark the centenary of the Confederation of Canada. The pavilion was built to promote Canadian telephone companies and their services. The pavilion's feature attraction was Canada '67, a documentary film directed by Robert Barclay for Walt Disney Productions. The movie was presented in Circle-Vision 360° to audiences of 1,200–1,500 people every 30 minutes.

AT&T Picturephone videophone demonstrations were also featured at the pavilion. The demonstration units were available in the pavilion for the public to test, with fair-goers permitted to make videophone calls to volunteer recipients in other cities.

The Telephone Pavilion additionally featured an 'Enchanted Forest' for families to see the planned new communication services of the future. As part of the display, smartly dressed pavilion hostesses performed live stage demonstrations of new telecommunication technologies, including telephone banking.

Preceded by Century 21 Exposition	World Expositions; 1967	Succeeded by HemisFair '68
