= Off Kilter (band) =

Celtic rock band

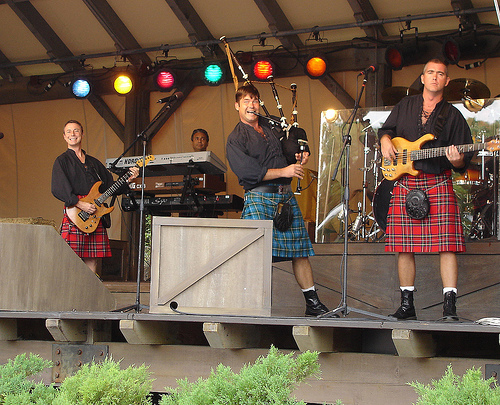
- Off Kilter performing live

Background information
- Origin: Florida, United States
- Genres: Celtic rock
- Years active: 1997-2021
- Members: Jamie Holton; Mark Weldon; Scott Zymowski; Randy Holbrook; Billy Varnes; Colin Farrell
- Past members: Tony Escapa

Off Kilter was a Celtic rock band. Off Kilter was formed in 1997, and performed regularly at Epcot from their inception in 1997 through September 27, 2014. Their first album, Off Kilter, included some traditional songs like "Dirty Old Town" and "Fields of Athenry" as well as covers of popular rock songs generally from Canadian artists such as "Takin' Care of Business" and "Summer of '69." They have also produced covers of the Battlefield Band's "The Rovin' Dies Hard". It was announced on August 28, 2014, that Off Kilter's final performance at Epcot would be September 27, 2014. They were replaced with a lumberjack-inspired show at the Canada pavilion, which was canceled November, 2015. Off Kilter announced their disbanding on December 11, 2021.

== Lineup ==
The band consisted of Jamie Holton who is from Ormond Beach, Florida on bagpipes, penny whistle and vocals; Mark Weldon from Cork, Ireland on bass and vocals; Randy Holbrook from Richmond, Kentucky on guitar and vocals; and Scott Zymowski from Ft. Lauderdale, Florida on drums and vocals.

Jamie Holton: Piper, singer, co-founder of Off Kilter. Began playing bagpipes at age 11. Winner of several piping competitions. Formerly worked at Rosie O'Grady's in downtown Orlando. Began working for Disney at age 20.

Mark Weldon: Bass player, singer, and co-founder of Off Kilter. Native of Cork, Ireland. Toured with many bands in Ireland.

Scott Zymowski: Drummer. Native Floridian. Began playing for pay at age 13.

Randy Holbrook: Lead guitar. Began playing guitar at age 9. Played in "Liberty and Justice" in 1995, and at Disney's Pleasure Island in a group called "Frankie and The West End Boys".

Former member

Tony Escapa: Keyboards. Born and raised in Mayagüez, Puerto Rico. Studied at Inter-American University and Berklee College of Music in Boston. Headed his own band called "EscapeFM" which toured Europe before his work at Disney.

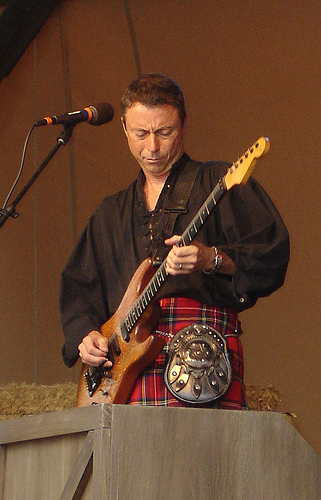
Randy Holbrook

== Discography ==
- Off Kilter (1998)
- Etched in Stone (2001)
- Celtic Armadillo (2003)
- The Live Tracks (2004)
- Kick It! (2005)
- One More Time (2016)
