= Circle-Vision 360° =

Theater-in-the-round attraction

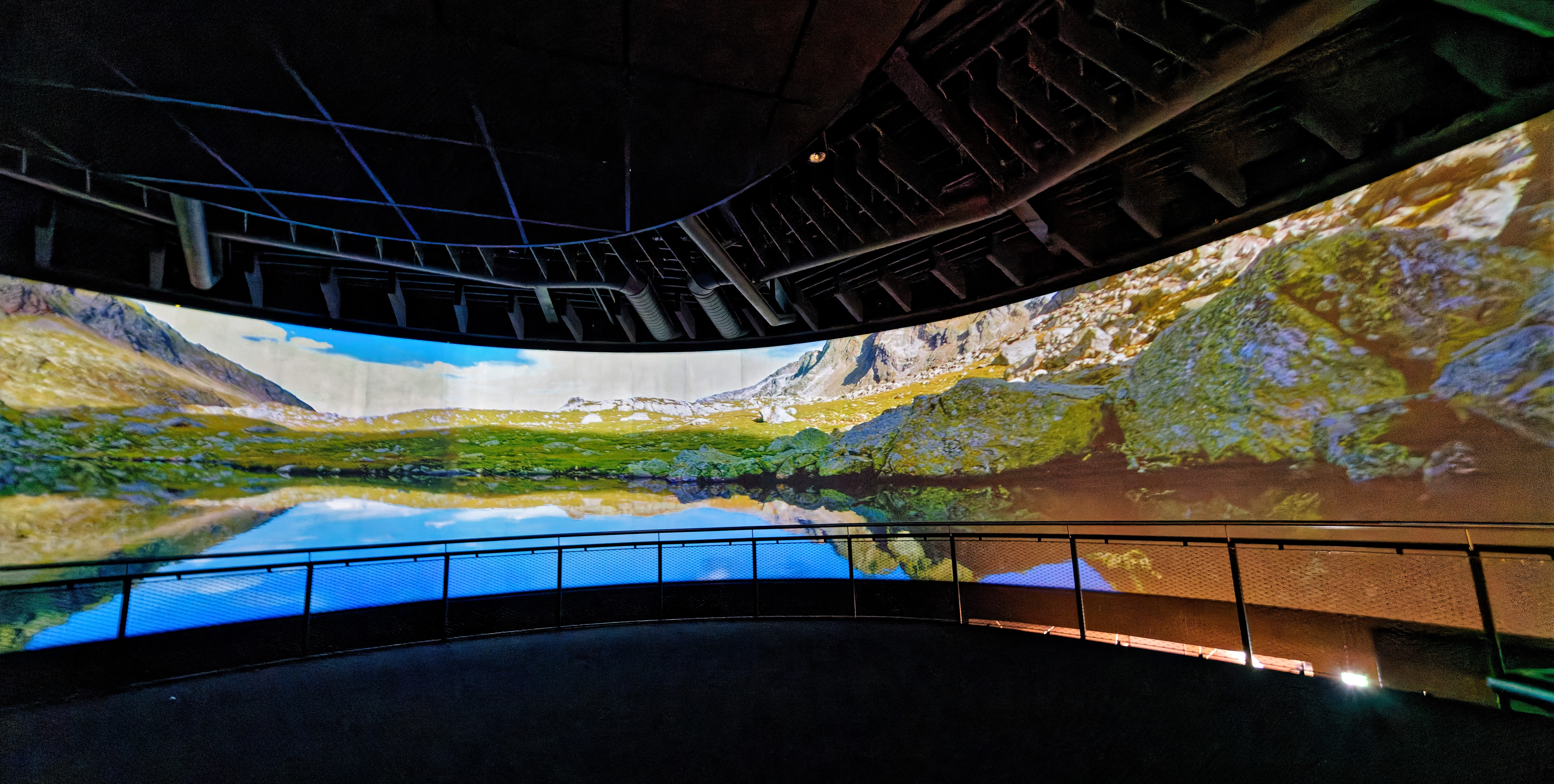
View of the 360-degree cinema (Mittersill, Austria)

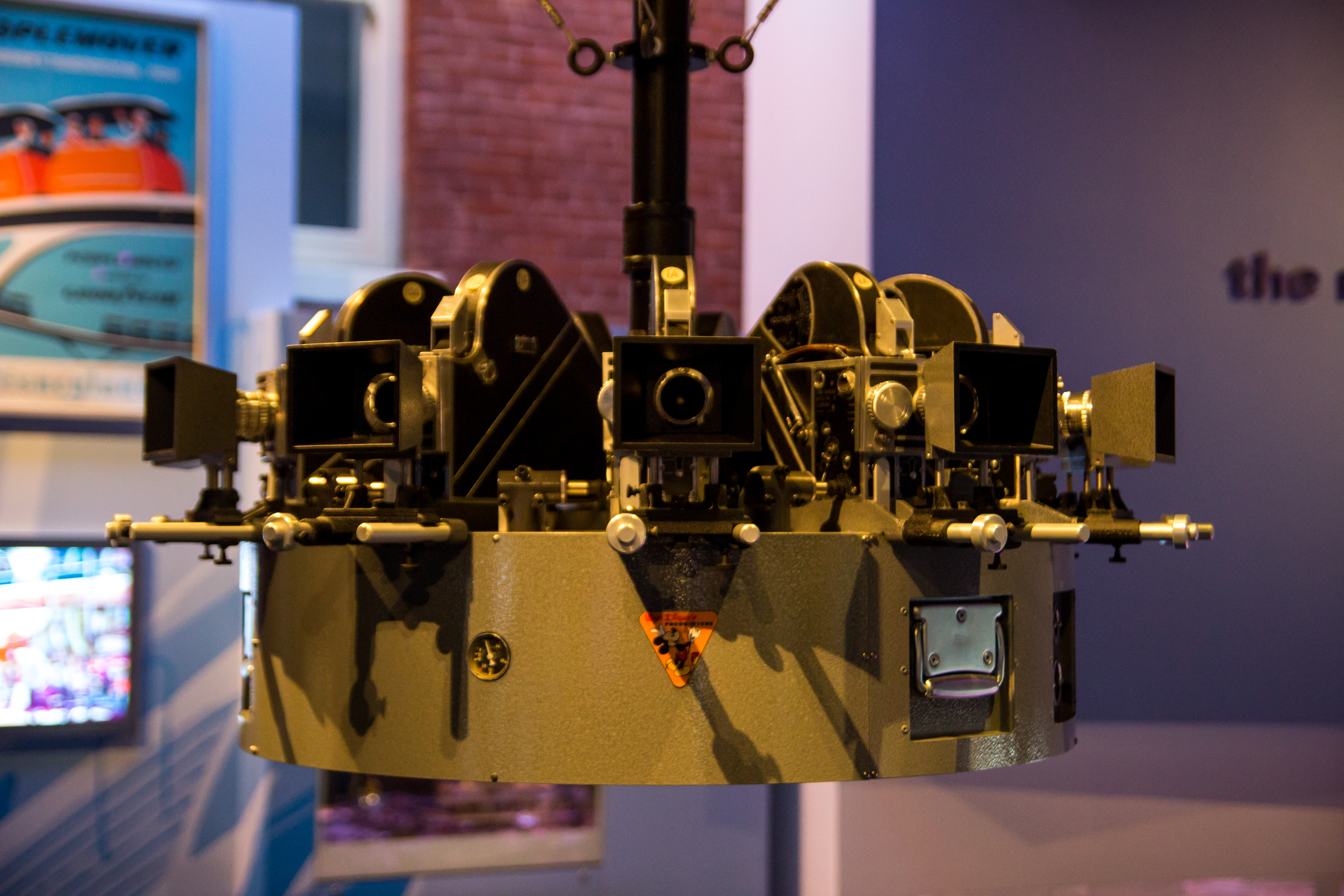
A Circarama 360° camera rig, using 16 mm cameras, displayed at the Walt Disney Family Museum

Circle-Vision 360° is a film format developed by The Walt Disney Company that uses projection screens which encircle the audience.

Circle-Vision 360° developed from the Circarama format, which uses eleven 16 mm projectors. The first Circarama film was A Tour of the West (1955). For the film Italia '61, the number of cameras was reduced to nine, and the 16 mm film was shown using 35 mm projectors. In 1965, Circle-Vision 360° made its official debut, in a nine-camera, 35 mm format. At least one reason for the renaming from Circarama was objections by the owners of Cinerama to the similarity between the two names.

In both the Circarama and Circle-Vision 360° formats, the screens are arranged in a circle around the audience, with small gaps between the screens. The number of screens (eleven or nine) being odd results in a gap being opposite of each screen in the circle. The projectors are placed in these gaps, above the heads of the viewers. Railings are sometimes provided to steady the audience members while viewing the film. The cameras and projection systems for both Circarama and Circle-Vision 360° were designed by longtime Disney animator and visual effects pioneer Ub Iwerks. Circle-Vision 360° cameras have been mounted on top of automobiles for travelog scenes. For The Timekeeper (1992), static cameras and CGI effects were used.

At one time, every one of the Disney Resorts then open had at least one Circle-Vision 360° theater. The Epcot theme park has the only two still operating as of 2025. (Note: A third theater at Epcot shows Impressions de France (1982), which was shot using five cameras, and is projected on screens comprising 200° of a circle.) Circarama and Circle-Vision 360° films have also been featured at various world's fairs.

== Circarama and Circle-Vision 360° films ==
A Tour of the West and the original 1958 version of America the Beautiful were shot in Circarama. Italia '61 was filmed in 16 mm and billed as a Circarama film, but was shown using nine 35 mm projectors. All other films in the table were shot in Circle-Vision 360°.

Title	Year	Premiere location	Length (minutes)	Contributors	Sponsor	Notes
A Tour of the West	1955	Disneyland	12		American Motors	Aka Circarama U.S.A.
America the Beautiful	1958	Expo 58	16 or 18	Producer: James Algar; Writer: James Algar	Ford	
Italia '61	1961	Expo 61		Executive producer: Roberto de Leonardis; Director: Elio Piccon	Fiat	Don Iwerks, son of Ub Iwerks, trained the crew, and stayed on to assist throughout the filming.
Magic of the Rails	1964 (Note: Year of release is sometimes given as 1965.)	Expo 64		Designer: Ernst A. Heiniger	Swiss Federal Railways	Aka Magie du rail and Zauber de Schiene.
America the Beautiful	1967	Disneyland	18		AT&T	Reshot and expanded version of the 1958 film.
Canada '67	1967	Expo 67	18	Director: Robert Barclay	Telephone Association of Canada	
Magic Carpet 'Round the World	1974	Magic Kingdom	21		Monsanto	
America the Beautiful	1975	Magic Kingdom			Monsanto	Version of the 1958 film revised for the United States Bicentennial.
O Canada!	1982	Epcot Center	18	Narrator: Corey Burton		
Wonders of China	1982	Epcot Center		Director: Jeff Blyth; Narrator: Keye Luke		
Magic Carpet 'Round the World	1983	Tokyo Disneyland				Revised version of the 1974 film.
American Journeys	1984	Disneyland			Pacific Southwest Airlines	
Portraits of Canada	1986	Expo 86			Telecom Canada	Aka Images du Canada.
Le Visionarium	1992	Disneyland Paris	18	Director: Jeff Blyth; Actors include Gérard Depardieu	Renault	Aka Un voyage à travers le temps and From Time to Time.
The Timekeeper	1994	Magic Kingdom	18	Director: Jeff Blyth; Voice actors: Robin Williams, Rhea Perlman; Other actors include Jeremy Irons	Renault	English version of Le Visionarium. Incorporates parts of Magic Carpet 'Round the World.
Reflections of China	2003	Epcot	12	Director: Jeff Blyth		
O Canada!	2007	Epcot		Narrator: Martin Short; Musical score: Bruce Broughton, featuring Eva Avila		Revised and updated version of the 1982 film.
Canada Far and Wide	2020	Epcot	12	Narrators: Catherine O'Hara, Eugene Levy; Musical score: Andrew Lockington		
Wondrous China	TBA	Epcot				

== Circarama and Circle-Vision 360° theaters ==
The theaters at Expo 58 and Disneyland were built as Circarama theaters. The latter would be upgraded to the Circle-Vision 360° system. Although the theater at Expo 61 predated the use of the Circle-Vision 360° name, it used nine 35 mm projectors. All other theaters in the tables were built as Circle-Vision 360° theaters.

=== Disney theme parks ===
Years in parentheses after a film title indicate the versions of the movie shown at the theater.

Park	Location in park	Formal names	Opened	Closed	Films shown	Sponsors	Replaced by
Disneyland	Tomorrowland	Circarama; Circle-Vision 360° World Premiere Circle-Vision	July 17, 1955	September 25, 2000 (Note: From 1997 to 2000, the theater was part of the Rocket Rods attraction.)	A Tour of the West; America the Beautiful (1958, 1967, 1975); American Journeys; Wonders of China	American Motors; AT&T/Bell System; Pacific Southwest Airlines; Delta Air Lines	Buzz Lightyear Astro Blasters
Magic Kingdom	Tomorrowland	Circle-Vision 360° Metropolis Science Center	November 25, 1971	February 26, 2006	America the Beautiful (1967, 1975); Magic Carpet 'Round the World (1974); American Journeys; The Timekeeper	Monsanto; Black & Decker	Monsters, Inc. Laugh Floor
Epcot	World Showcase (Canada Pavilion)		October 1, 1982	n/a	O Canada! (1982, 2007); Canada Far and Wide		n/a
Epcot	World Showcase (China Pavilion)		October 1, 1982	n/a	Wonders of China; Reflections of China; Wondrous China (Note: Upcoming.)		n/a
Tokyo Disneyland	Tomorrowland	Circle-Vision 360° Visionarium	April 15, 1983	September 1, 2002	Magic Carpet 'Round the World (1983); American Journeys; From Time to Time	Fujifilm	Buzz Lightyear Astro Blasters
Disneyland Paris	Discoveryland	Le Visionarium	April 12, 1992	September 6, 2004	Le Visionarium	Renault	Buzz Lightyear Laser Blast

=== Expos ===
Expo	City	Location at Expo	Opened	Closed	Film	Sponsor
Expo 58	Brussels, Belgium	United States Pavilion	April 17, 1958	October 19, 1958	America the Beautiful	Ford
Expo 61	Turin, Italy	Fiat Circarama Pavilion	May 1, 1961	October 31, 1961	Italia '61	Fiat
Expo 64	Lausanne, Switzerland	Transportation Pavilion	April 30, 1964	October 25, 1964	Magic of the Rails	Swiss Federal Railways
Expo 67	Montreal, Canada	Telephone Pavilion	April 28, 1967	October 29, 1967 (Note: America the Beautiful was shown at the extant theater in 1970.)	Canada '67	Telephone Association of Canada
Expo 86	Vancouver, Canada	Telecom Canada Pavilion	May 2, 1986	October 13, 1986	Portraits of Canada	Telecom Canada

== See also ==
- List of film formats
- Cinéorama
- Bell Canada Pavilion (Expo 67)
