= Canada Far and Wide =

Circle-Vision 360° film attraction

- Attraction logo Attraction film poster

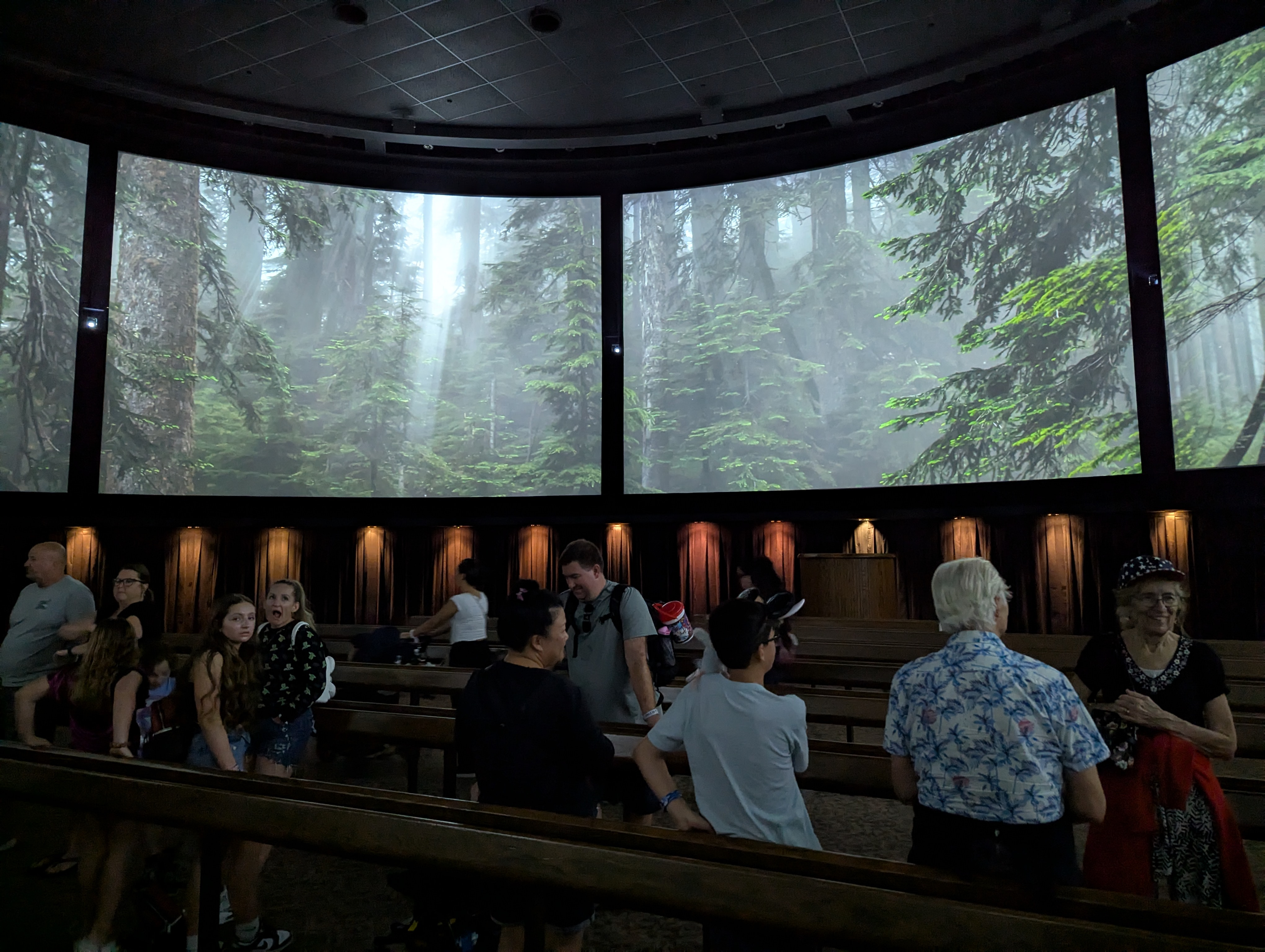
- Interior of show building with multiple screens.

Epcot
- Area: Canada Pavilion (World Showcase)
- Status: Operating
- Opening date: January 17, 2020
- Replaced: O Canada!

Ride statistics
- Attraction type: Circle-Vision 360° film
- Designer: Walt Disney Imagineering
- Model: 360° theatre
- Theme: Canadian sights
- Music: Andrew Lockington (score)
- Narrators: Catherine O'Hara; Eugene Levy
- Wheelchair accessible
- Assistive listening available

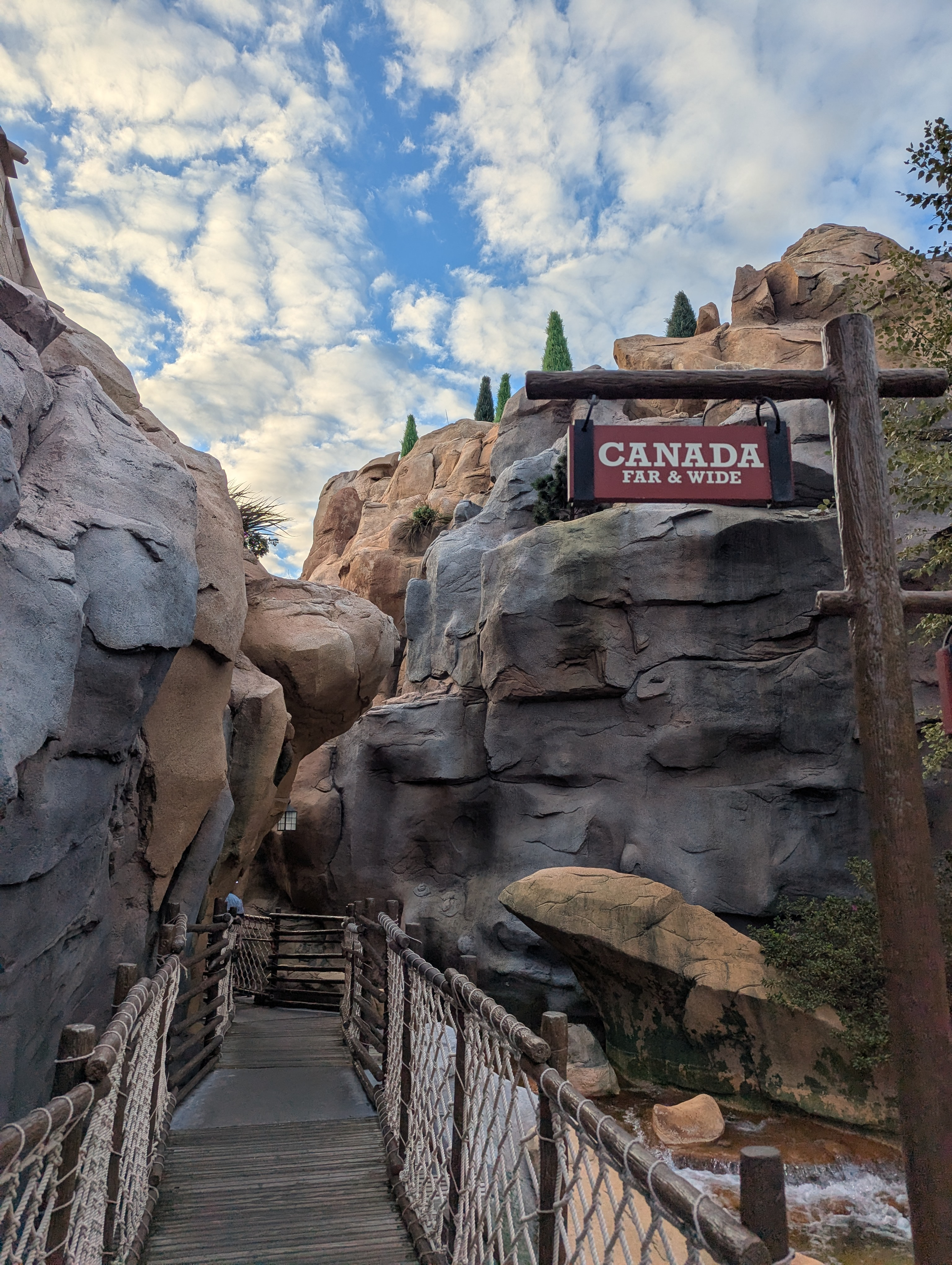
Queue for the attraction.

Canada Far and Wide is a Circle-Vision 360° documentary attraction for World Showcase at Epcot that started operation on January 17, 2020.

== Show summary ==
Replacing O Canada!, Canada Far and Wide is a feature with updated sequences, a new musical score by Canadian composer Andrew Lockington, and narration by Canadian actors Catherine O'Hara and Eugene Levy.
