= Walt Disney and the 1964 World's Fair =

Box set
- Released: March 24, 2009

Professional ratings
Review scores
Source	Rating
Allmusic	4/5 stars

Walt Disney and the 1964 World's Fair is a 2009 five-CD box set compiling music and audio from Disney's attractions at the 1964 New York World's Fair:

- General Electric's Progressland, featuring the Carousel of Progress
- Great Moments with Mr. Lincoln, presented by the State of Illinois
- "it's a small world", presented by Pepsi
- Ford's Magic Skyway

The set includes a 24-page booklet about the 1964 World's Fair researched and written by Stacia Martin, laid out by Bruce Gordon.

== Critical reception ==
J. Scott McClintock of AllMusic gave the set four out of five stars, commenting, "the recordings, along with the lavishly illustrated 24-page booklet, paint an inspiring picture of the creativity and knack for innovation that the Disney 'imagineers' brought to these beloved attractions."

Film critic and historian Leonard Maltin called the set "impressive" and "a treat for Disneyphiles everywhere," also noting, "[t]he audio quality is astonishing, from start to finish: you’d swear you were in the room with the actors and musicians.

== Track listing ==
=== Disc one: Progressland ===
"There's a Great Big Beautiful Tomorrow" music and lyrics by Richard M. Sherman and Robert B. Sherman

1. There's a Great Big Beautiful Tomorrow - 4:44
  - Instrumental entrance and exit version
2. Welcome - 0:20
  - Excerpt from recording session with Rex Allen
3. Walt Disney and the Sherman Brothers - 2:33
  - Excerpt from film produced for General Electric
4. Carousel of Progress (Early Script Reading) - 3:07
  - Featuring Imagineers James Algar, Marty Sklar, and John Hench
5. Carousel of Progress - 19:29
6. The Skydome Spectacular - 7:59
7. The Toucan and Parrot Electric Utility Show - 8:46
  - Voices of Paul Frees, Wally Boag, and Dick Wesson
8. Music to Buy Toasters By (Medallion City) - 10:02
  - Instrumental bossa nova version of "There's a Great Big Beautiful Tomorrow"
9. Mirror Maze - 5:09

There's a Great Big Beautiful Tomorrow (isolated instrumental pieces from the final show)

10. Kaleidophonic° Overture - 3:18
11. 1890s Variation - 0:46
12. Dixieland Variation - 1:46
13. 1920s Variation - 0:46
14. 1930s Variation - 0:48
15. Swing Variation - 1:05
16. 1960s Variation - 0:48
17. Horizons Variation (Epcot) - 1:09
  - Version from Epcot's Horizons pavilion

=== Bonus disc ===
1. Carousel of Progress (Alternate Universe Version) - 27:10
  - A fully scored, full-length version of Carousel of Progress with an alternate script

=== Disc two: Great Moments with Mr. Lincoln ===
1. Walt Disney introduction - :58
  - Promotional message by Walt Disney
2. Pre-show: The Illinois Story - 6:02
3. Main show: Great Moments with Mr. Lincoln - 9:11
  - Voice of Royal Dano as Abraham Lincoln
4. Pre-show score - 10:18
5. Main show score - 8:13
  - Scores by Buddy Baker
6. Dialog recording session - 5:33
  - With show writer James Algar and Royal Dano
7. Chorus - 1:37
  - Finale: "The Battle Hymn of the Republic"

=== Disc three: "It's a Small World" ===
"It's a Small World" music and lyrics by Richard M. Sherman and Robert B. Sherman

1. Queue/entrance music - 3:07
  - Arranged by Bobby Hammack
2. First demo recording - 1:06
3. Walt Disney welcome - 9:16
4. Vocals (isolated) - 2:16
5. The Ultimate MegaMix - 20:56
  - Every segment, presented in order of recording
6. Exit music - 2:40
7. Disneyland Paris variation I - 2:07
8. Disneyland Paris variation II - 1:29
  - Disneyland Paris variations arranged by John Debney
9. Chorus - :24
10. "it's a small world" - 21:21
  - The final version of the attraction

=== Disc four: Magic Skyway ===
1. World of Tomorrow - 3:01
  - Composed by George Bruns
2. The Magic Skyway - 10:55
  - Narrated by Walt Disney

International Gardens

- Pavilion atmosphere music

3. The South American Way - 2:47
4. Flubber Waltz (alt. NYWF title: Viennese) - 4:41
  - Originally composed by George Bruns for the film The Absent-Minded Professor
5. Serengeti Serenade - 4:05
  - Later used in the opening titles for The Jungle Book
6. Moonlight Time in Old Hawaii - 3:04
7. Nation on Wheels - 1:44
  - Originally composed by George Bruns for the television episode "Magic Highway U.S.A."
8. Flyin' Ford - 2:56
  - Originally composed by George Bruns for the film The Absent-Minded Professor
9. La Gaviota [The Seagull] - 3:13
  - Originally composed by George Bruns for Zorro TV series
10. Disneyland° - 3:09
  - Originally composed by George Bruns with lyrics by Larry Morey for the Disneyland TV series

11. Auto Parts Harmonic - 8:58
12. Dialog recording session - 8:28
  - Walt Disney's recording session
13. Get the Feel of the Wheel (Ford March) - 6:13
  - Composed by Richard M. Sherman and Robert B. Sherman

(° Written erroneously in booklet CD track listing, corrected here.)
