= The Best Time of Your Life =

Disney theme parks song

"The Best Time of Your Life" (often mistakenly "Now Is the Time", the first lyric) is a song written by Richard M. Sherman and Robert B. Sherman in 1974 as a new theme song for Walt Disney's Carousel of Progress. The attraction was being moved from Disneyland to Walt Disney World, and a replacement was sought for the original song, "There's a Great Big Beautiful Tomorrow" (also by the Sherman Brothers).

"There's a Great Big Beautiful Tomorrow" was reintroduced to the revamped pavilion in 1994 during Tomorrowland's transition into "The Future that Never Was." An instrumental version of "The Best Time of Your Life" is currently part of the background music loop for Tomorrowland at Disneyland, the Magic Kingdom, and Tokyo Disneyland.

== History ==
The song was written by Richard and Robert Sherman for the Carousel of Progress, one of four attractions Walt Disney and his Imagineers developed for the 1964 New York World's Fair. "There's a Great Big Beautiful Tomorrow" premiered with the show. The attraction moved to Disneyland after the fair. In 1973, the Carousel of Progress closed and moved to the Magic Kingdom at Walt Disney World.

The attraction was given a new show during the move, to update an increasingly outdated view of the future. General Electric, the sponsor of the Carousel of Progress, commissioned a new theme song, one to focus more on the here-and-now than on tomorrow, and the Sherman Brothers penned "The Best Time of Your Life". It was sung by Andrew Duggan, who also narrated and voiced the main character in the show. The song stayed with the show through another update in 1981, and General Electric's dropping of sponsorship in 1986.

In 1994, the Carousel was refurbished, along with the rest of Tomorrowland, to give a retrospective look at historical visions of and predictions about the future. In a tribute to the show's long history as part of the Disney company heritage, the attraction name was extended to "Walt Disney's Carousel of Progress". The show was rewritten to mimic its original, non-commercial message more closely, and the original song was restored.

The Sherman Brothers write in their joint autobiography regarding the history of the pavilion:

Three years after Walt Disney World opened, the Carousel of Progress moved east from Disneyland to Florida, and we were invited to write a brand new theme song: "The Best Time Of Your Life". In 1994, as a special tribute to the dreams of Walt Disney the Carousel of Progress was "updated" back to its original show, featuring our original theme song, "There's A Great Big Beautiful Tomorrow."

As recently as February 2025, an instrumental, electronic version of "The Best Time of Your Life" can be heard around Tomorrowland in the Magic Kingdom in Florida. A version can also be heard in the instrumental background music in Disneyland's Tomorrowland, even though the song was never used in Disneyland.
