= Space 220 Restaurant =

Restaurant at Epcot

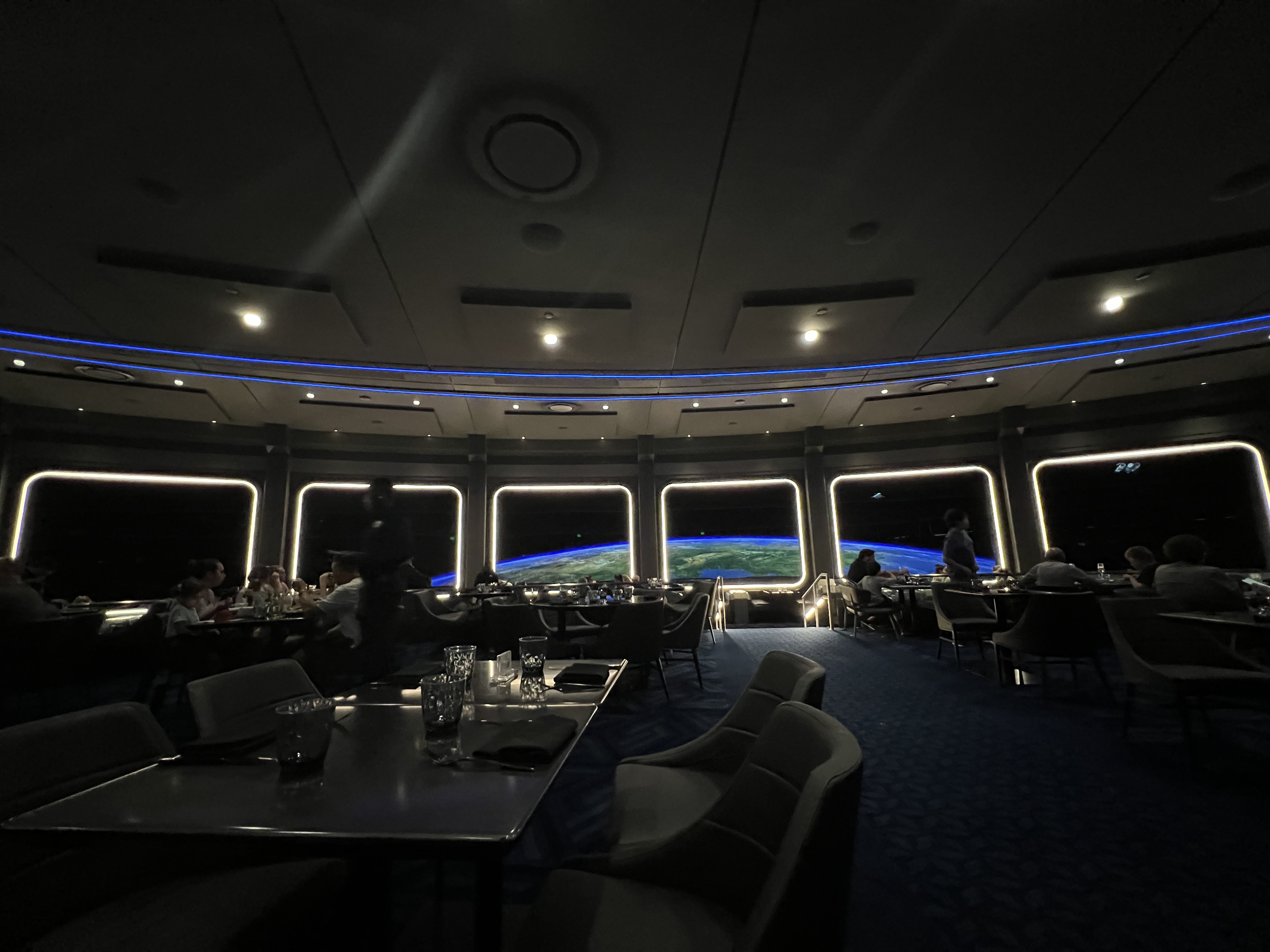
- Interactive map of Space 220 Restaurant

Restaurant information
- Established: September 20, 2021
- Owner: Patina Restaurant Group
- Head chef: Marc Kusche
- Food type: Modern cuisine of the United States
- Location: Bay Lake, Orange County, Florida, United States
- Coordinates: 28.3738°N 81.5470°W
- Seating capacity: Over 350
- Reservations: Recommended
- Location: World Discovery, Epcot; Walt Disney World
- Website: Official website

Space 220 Restaurant is a theme restaurant at Epcot, one of the four main parks at Walt Disney World in Bay Lake, Florida, United States. Run by the Patina Restaurant Group, it was established on September 20, 2021, as a space-themed restaurant. It is modeled after a space elevators habitable portion at the top, and has simulated daytime and nighttime views of the Earth inside the dining area. Guests are brought into the dining area through a simulated journey 220 miles (355 km) up to Centauri Space Station using a space elevator known as the Stellarvator.

The table-service restaurant serves modern American cuisine. The dishes served have themed names such as Space Greens (salad), Starry Calamari, and Neptune Tartare (yellowfin tuna). The restaurant serves Atmospheric Spirits, alcoholic beverages with names such as Celestial Cosmopolitan (vodka), Stargarita (margarita), and Jupiter Fizz (gin).

The restaurant has received generally positive reviews from critics. Most have applauded the experience, view, elevator, and theming, but some have criticized the food and price.

== History ==
Space 220 is in World Discovery adjacent to the attraction Mission: Space. The restaurant was announced at the 2017 D23 Expo to be opening in late 2019 as a part of the new Epcot expansion, but the opening was delayed because construction on the restaurant stopped because of the COVID-19 pandemic. Before creating the Stellarvator, a simulated elevator taking guests into space, planners consulted with NASA engineers on the design of such a space elevator.

Originally, Disney hired Theo Schoenegger to be the restaurant's executive chef; he was currently also the executive chef of other Disney restaurants such as Maria & Enzo's Ristorante and Enzo's Hideaway Tunnel Bar. After Schoenegger left Florida, Disney had to find a new chef within months of the original opening date. Before the postponed opening, Disney hired Marc Kusche as the restaurant's executive chef.

After construction in the park resumed on August 18, 2020, Space 220 would later open on September 20, 2021, for Walt Disney World's 50th anniversary. Reservations for Space 220 were not accepted until after the first week of the restaurant's opening, and queuing patrons faced wait times of five hours or longer during the first week, a longer wait than those of the park's attractions. Walt Disney World implemented a virtual line queue similar to that of the old virtual queue for the attraction Star Wars: Rise of the Resistance so that guests could walk around the park while waiting. The restaurant's food director later said that Space 220 would change its menu twice per year.

== Theme ==
Space 220 is based on a space station. Before entering, guests are handed boarding passes and later enter the restaurant through a simulated journey 220 miles (355 km) up to the Centauri Space Station through a space elevator called the Stellarvator. The elevator features a circular viewing screen in the middle of the floor and ceiling. Though it does not actually leave the ground, the elevator allows guests to look through the viewing screens to see themselves lift off from Epcot in the bottom screen and into the space station on the top screen. After exiting the elevator, guests walk into a long neon hallway with a circular rotating vegetable garden called the Growth Zone, which contains items from the menu. It is based on the vegetable-production systems found in real space stations.

The hallway leads guests into the dining area with several floor-to-ceiling windows lined up across the exterior wall of the dining room. Daytime and nighttime simulated views of the Earth can be seen through the windows alongside floating astronauts, flying dogs, other space stations, an X-wing, a lightsaber fight between two astronauts, the ride vehicle for Guardians of the Galaxy: Cosmic Rewind, and spacecraft, including the space shuttle from Mission: SPACE. The restaurant contains more than 350 seats, and the chairs, tables, and booths are colored a utilitarian gray, with the table settings as black.

Disney Imagineers designed a realistic simulated view of the Earth based on the Florida weather. The bathroom signs are marked with figures in space suits, and other signs warn of the danger of the loss of gravity. Atmospheric background music plays while guests are dining. Guests exit the restaurant through the same path by which they entered, but while exiting, they instead see themselves descend from the space station back to Epcot. Rich Pope of the Orlando Sentinel said, "Epcot Space 220 is futuristic with a hint of retro, sticks to its outer space theming at every turn and tosses in educational matter just for fun."

== Food ==
The restaurant is operated by the Patina Restaurant Group, which operates several other Disney restaurants such as The Edison and the Maria & Enzo's Ristorante at Disney Springs. The restaurant opens at 11:30 a.m. and serves lunch until 3:55 p.m. Dinner begins at 4:00 p.m., and the restaurant closes along with the park at 9:00 p.m. Space 220 trading cards, which come with space artwork and trivia on them, are included with the purchase of non-alcoholic beverages and kids' meals.

Created by executive chef Marc Kusche, the food at Space 220 is modern American cuisine. Lunch at the restaurant includes one Lift-off (hors d'oeuvre) and one Star Course (entrée). Dinner comes with the same menu, but with different Star Courses. The dishes have space-themed names such as the Big Bang Burrata, Starry Calamari, Neptuna Tartare (yellowfin tuna), Space Greens (salad), Centauri Burger, and Terra-Bolognese.

Desserts at the restaurant are called Supernova Sweets and include carrot cake, chocolate cheesecake, lemon mousse, toffee pudding cake, and gelato and sorbet. Side dishes, named Satellite Sides, are the same for lunch and dinner, including roasted fingerling potatoes, fried potato wedges, brussels sprouts, and broccolini. The restaurant's Space Station Supplements, which is an option of one additional entrée for an extra charge, feature lobster and ribeye steak dishes.

Alcoholic beverages are called Atmospheric Spirits and also come with space-themed names, including Celestial Cosmopolitan (vodka), Stargarita, The Nebula, Planetary Punch, Jupiter Fizz, The Big Tang, Red Star, and Atmospritz. Non-alcoholic beverages called Zero-Proof Cocktails include The Milky Way, Moon Rocks, and Lightyear Lemonade. Other alcoholic beverages include cocktails, craft beer, and fine wines.

== Reception ==
Space 220 has generally received positive reviews from critics. Robert Pearlman, writer at Space.com, said that the restaurant has "redefined what it means to dine with a view". He also said that the subtle details "enhance the feeling that guests are aboard a space station". Carly Caramanna of Insider said that the restaurant is "probably only worth it if you have kids". She also said that the theming, elevator, view, and beverages were her favorite things, but said that the food were "all misses". Space 220 made Mashed.com's list of the 18 best restaurants at Epcot at 16, calling it "out of this world", but said "come here for the views, not the food".

Insider's Kari Becky stated, "It's definitely a hefty price tag for lunch, but the combination of the atmosphere, food, and experience, made it well worth it to try at least once." Calling Space 220 "the happiest place in space", as a pun off Walt Disney World's slogan "the most magical place on Earth", Josh Elliot of Narcity stated that guests can "Eat better than an astronaut and get a great view of space without ever leaving Earth!" Travel Weekly writer Tom Stieghorst said that while it was "not an E ticket attraction... For space tourism on the cheap, it can't be beat."

A writer at NBC-2.com said that Space 220 is the "most inspired new restaurant since Be Our Guest”. They positively compared it to Coral Reef Restaurant and called the food "light and tasty". Margarida Bastos of Collider stated that the restaurant is "yet another milestone to add to the continuous transformation of this otherworldly park". A writer at CollectSPACE applauded the restaurant, declaring the effect "engaging" and commenting that it gives guests a feel for what it would be like in space "just with better food".
