= Whole-body vibration =

Type of mechanotherapy

Whole body vibration (WBV) is a generic term used when vibrations (mechanical oscillations) of any frequency are transferred to the human body. Humans are exposed to vibration through a contact surface that is in a mechanical vibrating state. Humans are generally exposed to many different forms of vibration in their daily lives. This could be through a driver's seat, a moving train platform, a power tool, a training platform, or any one of countless other devices. It is a potential form of occupational hazard, particularly after years of exposure.

When high frequency vibrations (above 50 Hz) enter through the hands, occupational safety concerns may arise. For example, working with a jackhammer has been known to develop vibration white finger. Exposures and limits have been estimated in the ISO 5349-1 for hand-transmitted vibration.

A 2018 meta-analysis said that whole body vibration can improve bone mineral density in the lumbar spine of postmenopausal women as well as the femoral neck density of postmenopausal women younger than 65.

== As a hazard ==
Humans are sensitive to mechanical oscillations ranging in frequency from well below 1 Hz up to 100 kHz. Lower frequencies of vibration lead to human motion sickness while higher frequencies can lead to general annoyance and discomfort. The minimization of discomfort due to vehicle vibration is important in the automotive industry where ride quality is important. Discomfort and even pain may be extremely prevalent in situations where medically injured patients are transported. The discomfort due to vibration can be estimated in various environments.

=== Workplace exposure ===
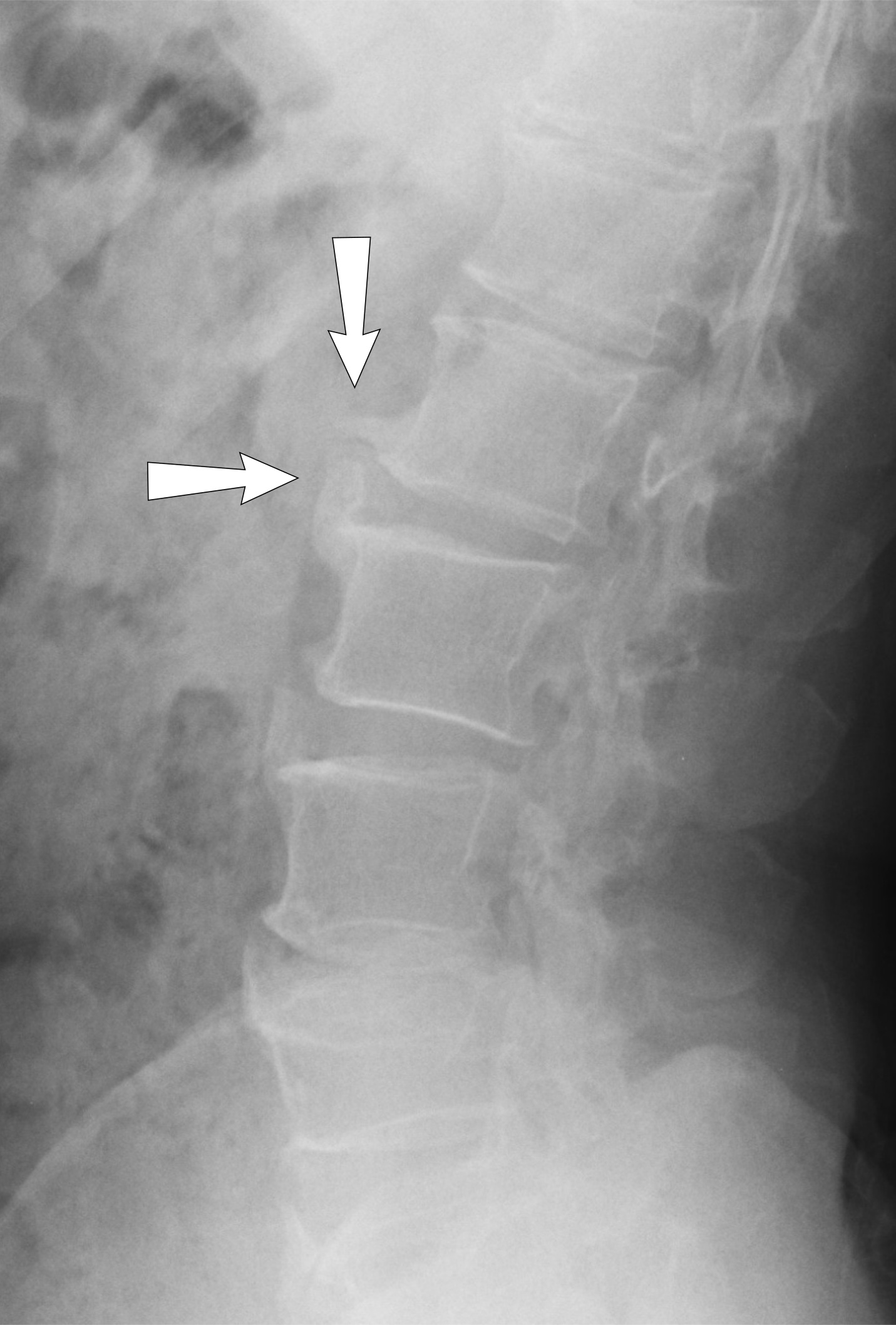
X-ray of spondylosis of the lumbar spine

Workplace exposures to whole-body vibrations for long durations can lead to musculoskeletal problems of many kinds. Problems of the neck and lower back in particular can be common for operators of heavy equipment including construction, forestry, agriculture, and trucking. Other occupations where whole-body vibrations may be present include aircraft operators, sea vessel workers, drivers of public transportation like trains and buses.

Farmers with long-term exposure to whole body vibration and mechanical shocks have a higher prevalence of back pain (compared to those not exposed to vibration), and the prevalence increases with vibration dose. Long-term exposure affecting the whole body leads to spinal degeneration (spondylosis) and increased risk of low back pain.

Factors that affect the occupational exposure to whole-body vibration include the frequency of vibrations, the magnitude of vibrations, the daily exposure to vibrations, the standing or seating posture of the operator, the direction of the vibration, and how tightly coupled the human is to the source of the vibration. Exposure limits and estimates have been characterized in the ISO 2631-1 for whole-body vibration. Measurements of vibration exposure are usually taken at the human/vibration interface.

=== Patient transport ===
Injured patients can be exposed to shocks and vibrations during transport which can worsen patient conditions due to involuntary motions of the body. Many forms of immobilization devices are used to limit this motion with varying degrees of success. Common modes of patient transport include hand carried stretcher (litter), ground ambulance, and air medical services which all contain multiple forms of shocks and whole-body vibrations.

=== Measurement ===
Measurements are taken with accelerometers to estimate the amount of vibration exposure to the human body. These measurements are taken at the human body or at the vibration source or surface. Measurements of different directions are taken to relate the motion direction with the response of the human body. Specifically, transfer functions can be used to determine the human response to the vibration. Measurement techniques for estimating exposures to whole body vibrations and hand-arm vibration have been developed in International Standards.

== Vibration training ==
Vibration training is the deliberate exposure to the body of varying frequencies/amplitudes/forces using certain joint angles for any limited time (approximately 1 minute sets). It is also known as vibration therapy, vibrotherapy, biomechanical stimulation, mechanostimulation and biomechanical oscillation. It employs low amplitude, low frequency mechanical stimulation. It can be pivotal/oscillating (vibrating from side to side) or lineal (vibrating up and down).

=== History ===
The immediate predecessor of modern vibration training is Rhythmic Neuromuscular Stimulation (RNS). In then East Germany, Biermann was experimenting with the use of cyclic massage and its effects on trunk flexion as early as the 1960s.

The technique has been tested on turkeys in the hope of finding a benefit that could be used for astronauts. Engineering issues came into play when an attempt was made to upgrade the test machine to support the weight of a human being. Once the vibration intensity grew strong enough to lift over 40 kg, fractures appeared in the steel. The first bed-rest study using a vibration training device for humans was done by the European Space Agency (ESA) in 2003 in Berlin (Berlin Bedrest Study, BBR). The same technology was then used in several parabolic flight campaigns of the DLR (German Aerospace Agency) starting in 2006 where the feasibility of use of a lightweight vibration training device under microgravity conditions was demonstrated and in 2009 and 2010 where basic research on influence of microgravity on vibration training effects was investigated.

=== Training effects ===
A 2018 meta-analysis concluded that whole body vibration improved lumbar spine bone mineral density (BMD) in postmenopausal women, and enhanced femoral neck BMD in postmenopausal women younger than 65 years.

A review in 2014 concluded that there is little and inconsistent evidence that acute or chronic whole body vibration could improve the performance of competitive or elite athletes.

Cochrane reviews have concluded that there is insufficient evidence of effect of whole body vibration training on functional performance of people with neurodegenerative disease, or in disease-related problems in people with fibromyalgia.

Some research supports benefits for arthritis and knee pain.

=== Vibrating platform types ===
Vibrating platforms fall into different, distinct categories. The type of platform used is a moderator of the effect and result of the training or therapy performed. Main categories of machine types are:

1. High energy linear, found mostly in commercial vibration training studios and gyms. The vibration direction is lineal/upward
2. Premium speed pivotal, (teeter-totter movement) used for physiotherapy work at lower speeds and exercise workouts at "premium" speed, up to 30 Hz. Both commercial and home units are available.
3. Medium energy lineal, the majority of lineal platforms produced. These are usually made of plastic; some have 3-D vibration which is low quality.
4. Low speed pivotal units.
5. Low magnitude mechanical stimulation. They are platforms that use energy levels less than 1 g and typically move in the z-axis.

Other machine types are low energy/low amplitude lineal and low energy/high amplitude lineal.

Concerning the z-movements, two main types of system can be distinguished:

- Side alternating (pivotal) systems, operating like a see-saw and hence mimicking the human gait where one foot is always moving upwards and the other one downwards, and
- Linear systems where the whole platform is mainly doing the same motion, respectively: both feet are moved upwards or downwards at the same time.

Systems with side alternation usually have a larger amplitude of oscillation and a frequency range of about 5 Hz to 40 Hz. Linear/upright systems have lower amplitudes but higher frequencies in the range of 20 Hz to 50 Hz. Despite the larger amplitudes of side-alternating systems, the vibration (acceleration) transmitted to the head is significantly smaller than in non-side-alternating systems while at the same time muscle activation even at identical vibration parameters are increased in pivotal systems. However, standing with both heels on one side of a side-alternating machine facing side-ways results in significant acceleration transmitted to the head and center of gravity of the upper body. At least one such whole body vibration owner's manual suggest this variation calling it "Stand-a-side Pose". At the outer edge of the plate the amplitude is typically about 10 mm, which is more than the 3 mm maximum of a linear vibrator and not practical. The amplitude and impact can be reduced by centering, e.g., a gardener's knee pad, ~ 16"x 8" x 3/4", on the plate and standing with the heels toward the outer edge of the pad. While this is useful it does not replace a machine whose entire plate moves up and down in a linear fashion allowing for a variety of positions and activities.

Mechanical stimulation generates acceleration forces acting on the body. These forces cause the muscles to lengthen, and this signal is received by the muscle spindle, a small organ in the muscle. This spindle transmits the signal through the central nervous system to the muscles involved.

=== Belts ===
A vibrating belt machine (also Mueller belt machine, belt massager, or jiggler machine) is an exercise machine that uses a vibrating belt, to be used around the waist or buttocks.

== See also ==
- Hand-arm vibration
- Noise, vibration, and harshness
