= Mission: Space =

Space simulator attraction at Epcot

- The pavilion logo introduced in 2019 The original and primary attraction logo used since 2003

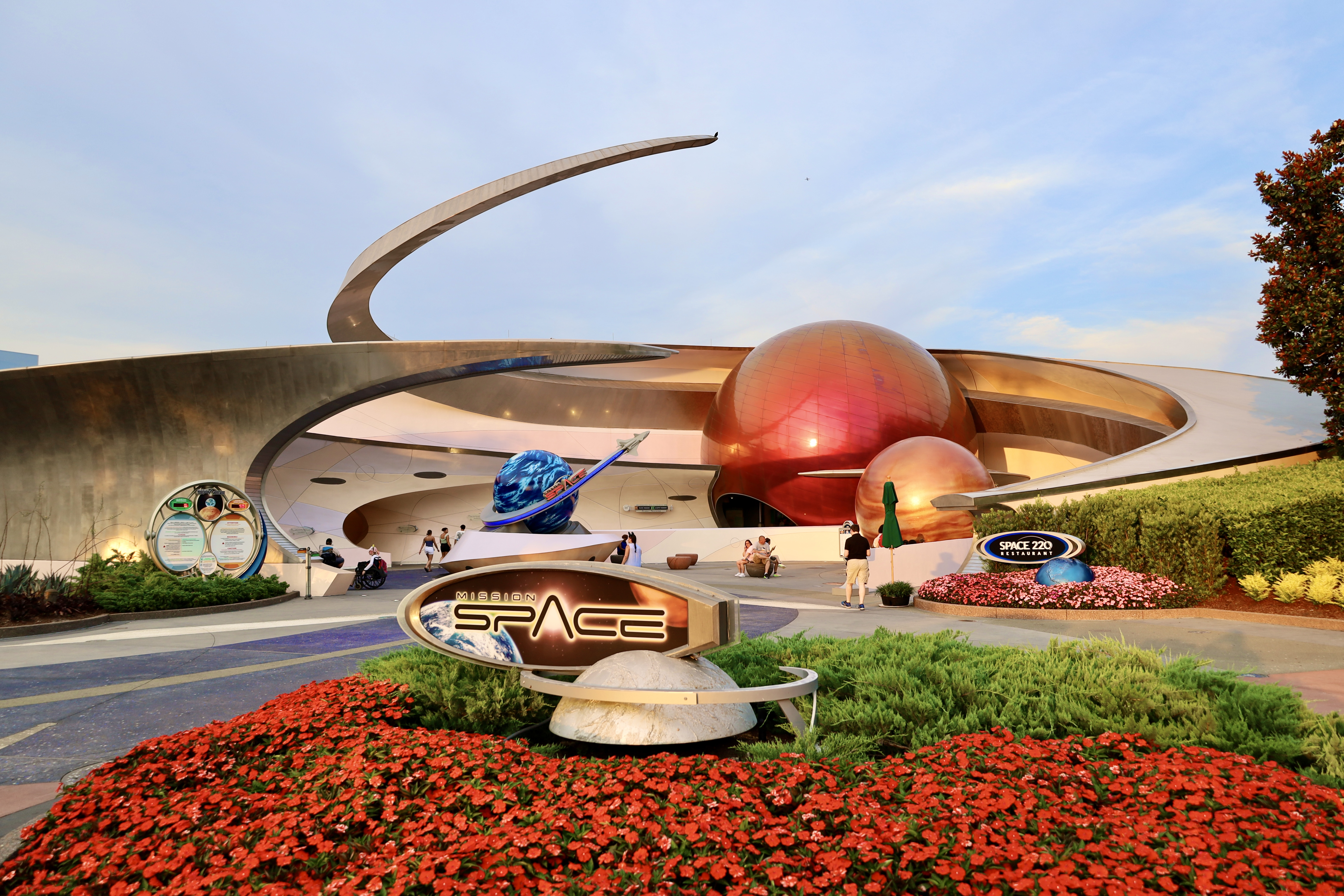
- Pavilion exterior in 2022

Epcot
- Area: Future World (2003–2021); World Discovery (2021–present)
- Coordinates: 28°22′26″N 81°32′48″W
- Status: Operating
- Cost: US$100 million
- Opening date: August 15, 2003
- Replaced: Horizons (Future World)

Ride statistics
- Attraction type: Space simulator
- Designer: Walt Disney Imagineering
- Theme: Mission to Mars
- Music: "Destiny" by Cliff Masterson
- G-force: 2.5
- Capacity: 1,600 riders per hour
- Vehicle type: X-2 Deep Space Shuttle
- Vehicles: 40 (between 4 centrifuges)
- Riders per vehicle: 4
- Rows: 1
- Riders per row: 4
- Duration: 5:38
- Height restriction: 40 in (102 cm)
- Pre-show host: Capcom (portrayed by Gary Sinise, 2003–2017; Gina Torres, 2017–present)
- Attraction host: Capcom
- Sponsor: Hewlett-Packard (2003–2015)
- Lightning Lane available
- Must transfer from wheelchair
- Assistive listening available
- Closed captioning available

Mission: Space (stylized as Mission: SPACE) is a space exploration-themed pavilion and attached centrifugal motion simulator attraction located in the World Discovery section of Epcot at Walt Disney World in Bay Lake, Florida. The attraction replaced Horizons, and simulates what an astronaut might experience aboard a spacecraft on a mission to Mars, from the higher g-force of liftoff, to the speculative hypersleep. The pavilion also includes the Mission Space: Cargo Bay gift shop, the Advanced Training Lab interactive play area and Space 220 Restaurant.

== History ==
The attraction opened to the public in a "soft opening" mode in June 2003, and celebrated its grand opening on October 9 with a ceremony attended by Disney CEO Michael Eisner, HP CEO Carly Fiorina and NASA Administrator Sean O'Keefe, as well as several NASA astronauts from its many phases of human space exploration (Mercury, Gemini, Apollo, the Space Shuttle program and two crew members aboard the International Space Station). The attraction was built on the former site of Horizons, a dark ride that offered optimistic visions of what life might be like in the future. Horizons closed permanently in 1999 after a few years of sporadic operation; construction began on Mission: Space shortly thereafter. Industry estimates put the cost of developing the new attraction at US$100 million. The pavilion, like others at Epcot, used to feature a VIP lounge for HP employees called The Red Planet Room.

Mission: Space was sponsored by Compaq, which began working with Disney Imagineers on the design in April 2000. Hewlett-Packard assumed the sponsorship upon its merger with Compaq in 2002. The simulator hardware used in Mission: Space was designed and built by Environmental Tectonics Corporation of Pennsylvania with a nearly $30 million contract awarded in February 2000. Environmental Tectonics sued Disney in 2003 seeking over $15 million alleging failure to pay the full amount of the contract and sharing proprietary design details with competitors. The companies settled in January 2009. HP later declined to renew its sponsorship, and the company's branding was removed in 2015.

The attraction was completely closed for a refurbishment on June 5, 2017. During the D23 Expo 2017, it was confirmed that the Green Mission would be given a new video simulating a flight around the Earth, and the Orange Mission would keep the Mars mission, but with updated graphics. The attraction reopened on August 13, 2017 with the Earth Mission (or Green Mission), where the centrifuge does not spin, thus eliminating the forces of lateral acceleration for riders who choose the more tame experience. The cabs themselves still pitch and pivot, providing some motion. The attraction's opening day experience was renamed the Mars Mission (or Orange Mission).

== Ride experience ==
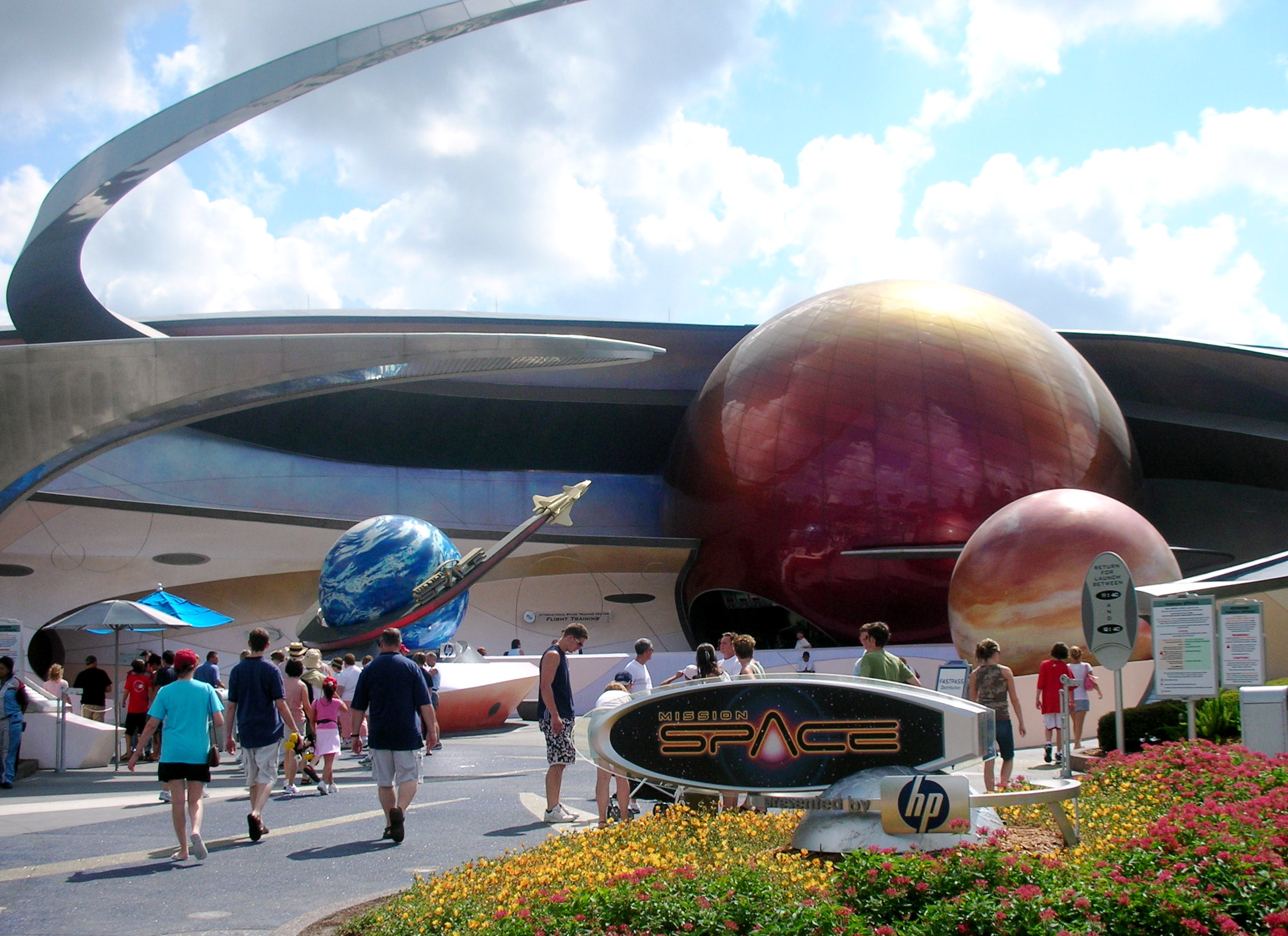
Mission: Space, pictured in 2006, then-sponsored by Hewlett-Packard

Mission: Space is meant to simulate astronaut training for the first crewed mission to Mars aboard the fictional X-2 Deep Space Shuttle in the year 2036, right after the seventy-fifth anniversary of Yuri Gagarin becoming the first human to enter space. The attraction queue contains several items and commemorative plaques from past, present, and fictional future space missions. Among the items on display are props from the 2000 film Mission to Mars, including the rotating "gravity wheel" from the predecessor X-1 spacecraft, a model of which hangs from the ceiling, and a replica of a NASA moon rover from the Apollo program.

=== Pre-show ===
Riders enter the fictional International Space Training Center (ISTC), where they are arranged into crews of four before watching an introductory video by the ISTC's Capsule communicator (or Capcom). Actor Gary Sinise, who starred in the space films Apollo 13 and Mission to Mars, portrayed the Capcom from the attraction's opening day until 2017, after which, actress Gina Torres replaced him in the role. The female flight director was replaced by a male one, played by Bayardo De Murguia.

Before boarding, each rider is assigned an on-board role (navigator, pilot, commander, or engineer) and given two tasks to perform during the mission, by pressing a specific button when prompted. The spacecraft's on-board self-automated pilot will perform each task if the rider does not respond to their prompt from Mission Control or if there is no one to perform the task. Also featured are various labeled buttons and switches which the rider may interact with but have no function.

=== Attraction ===
For both missions, riders board the futuristic X-2 vehicle, a three-stage rocket which is said to use several technologies in development today, including aerospike engines, solid hydrogen fuel, an aerobrake, and carbon nanotubes. Mission: Space is divided in two missions:

- The Mars Mission (intense or Orange Mission) includes a liftoff from the ISTC, a slingshot around the moon for a gravity-assisted boost, followed by a brief period of simulated hypersleep (to pass the lengthy time required to reach Mars), and a descent for landing on the Martian surface, where riders manually control the vehicle with a joystick.
- The Earth Mission (less intense or Green Mission) includes a liftoff from the ISTC, an orbiting tour of the Earth, and a descent back to the ISTC that involves riders having to manually navigate through a thunderstorm over the landing runway using their joystick.

Upon conclusion of the training exercise, guests exit through the Advanced Training Lab interactive play area, and Mission Space: Cargo Bay gift shop.

== Mechanics ==
The attraction is a multiple-arm centrifuge that achieves the illusion of acceleration by spinning and tilting sealed capsules during the four-minute "mission". Fans blow air gently at riders to help avoid motion sickness, and a magnified display in front of each rider simulates a window to space with high-resolution computer-generated imagery. Mission: Space comprises four separate centrifuges, each with 10 capsules holding four riders. The attraction exposes riders to forces up to 2.5G, more than twice the force of gravity at the Earth's surface (effectively multiplying a rider's weight by 2.5). A few months after the ride's opening, motion sickness bags were added within easy reach of riders.
