= Walt Disney's Carousel of Progress =

Stage show at Magic Kingdom

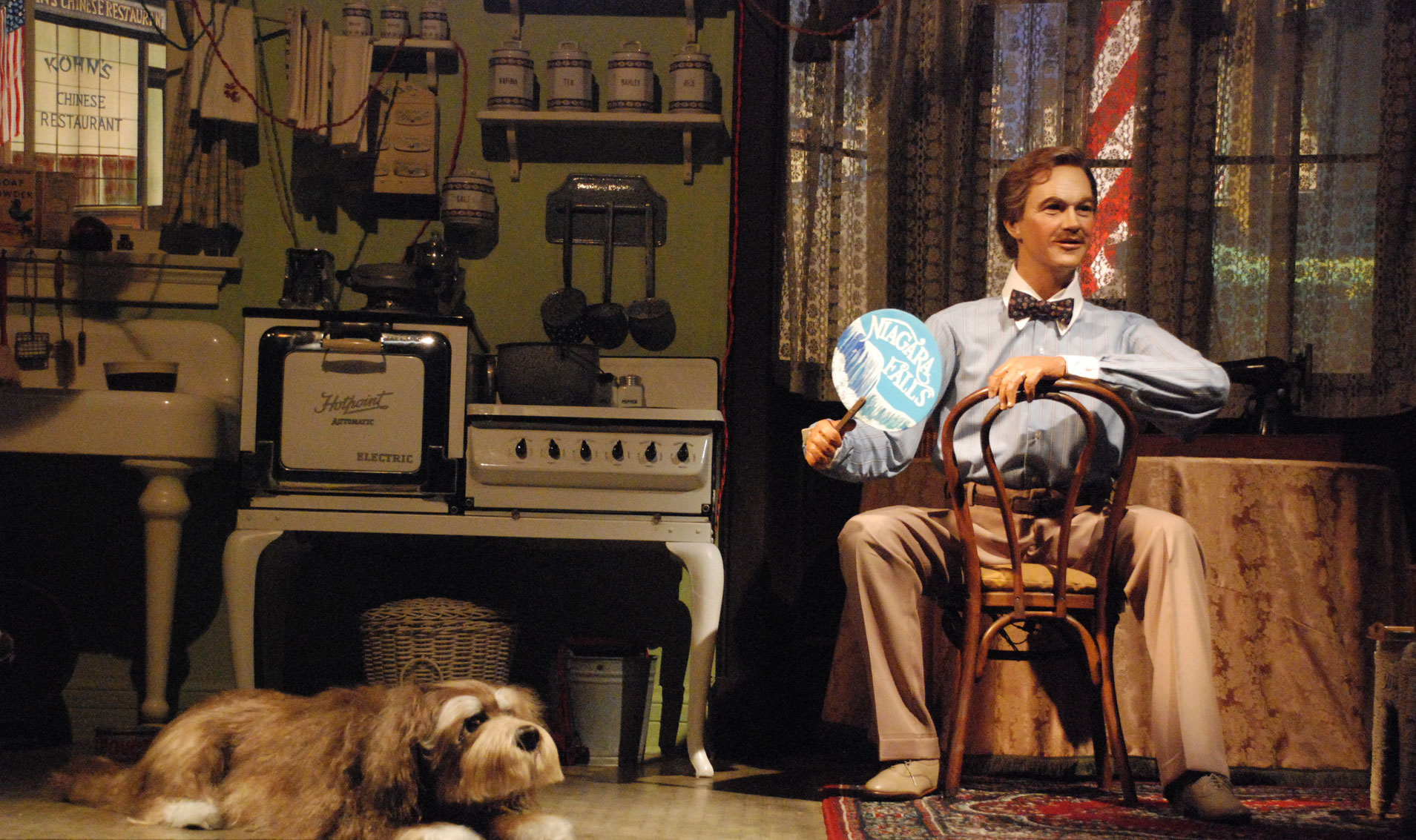
- Act 2 of the Magic Kingdom version

Magic Kingdom
- Area: Tomorrowland
- Coordinates: 28.417764°N 81.578794°W
- Status: Under construction
- Opening date: January 15, 1975

Disneyland
- Area: Tomorrowland
- Coordinates: 33.812006°N 117.916559°W
- Status: Removed
- Opening date: July 2, 1967
- Closing date: September 9, 1973
- Replaced by: America Sings

1964 New York World's Fair
- Area: General Electric's Progressland
- Coordinates: 40.747423°N 73.838220°W
- Status: Removed
- Cost: $15,000,000
- Opening date: April 22, 1964
- Closing date: October 17, 1965

Ride statistics
- Designer: WED Enterprises
- Model: Rotating theater
- Theme: Advancement of technology in the 20th century
- Music: "There's a Great Big Beautiful Tomorrow" by the Sherman Brothers (music & lyrics)
- Audience capacity: 240 per show
- Duration: 21:00
- Sponsor: General Electric: 1964–1965 New York World's Fair (1964–1965); Disneyland (1967–1973); Walt Disney World (1975–1985); None: (1985–present) (Reopening in 2027)
- Wheelchair accessible
- Assistive listening available
- Closed captioning available

Walt Disney's Carousel of Progress is a rotating theater Audio-Animatronics stage show attraction in Tomorrowland at the Magic Kingdom theme park at Walt Disney World Resort in Bay Lake, Florida, just outside Orlando. Created by Walt Disney and WED Enterprises as the prime feature of the General Electric (GE) Pavilion for the 1964 New York World's Fair, the attraction was moved to Tomorrowland at Disneyland in Anaheim, California, as Carousel of Progress, and remained there from 1967 until 1973. It was replaced in Disneyland by America Sings in 1974, and reopened in its present home in the Magic Kingdom in 1975.

Steeped in both nostalgia and futurism, the attraction's premise is an exploration of the joys of living through the advent of electricity and other technological advances during the 20th century via a "typical" American family. To keep it current with the times, the attraction has been updated five times (in 1967, 1975, 1981, 1985, and 1994), and has had two theme songs, both written by the Sherman Brothers, Disney's Academy Award-winning songwriting team.

The Carousel of Progress holds the record as the longest-running stage show in the history of American theater. It is one of the oldest attractions in the Walt Disney World Resort. It is also the oldest attraction at Walt Disney World to have been worked on by Walt Disney.

== Summary ==
=== Intro ===
The attraction begins with a brief introduction about Walt Disney's idea for the attraction's debut at the 1964-1965 New York World's Fair and how he always had a passion for progress. Regarded as the longest-running stage show in American theater history, the theater then begins to rotate for each act to the theme song "There's a Great Big Beautiful Tomorrow" by the Sherman Brothers.

=== Act 1: Turn of the Century (1900s) ===
The first act is set on Valentine's Day, "right around the turn of the century". The father of the family, John, is sitting on a wooden rocking chair in his home, his dog, Rover, lying on the floor. He mentions that two brothers in North Carolina are working on a "flying contraption" but comments it will never work, followed by mentions of the new inventions and technological achievements of the day. After he shows off the new technology, he calls to his wife, Sarah, who is ironing in the room to John's right. The two discuss how Thomas Edison is working on an idea for "snap-on electric lights", to which Sarah comments "no more kerosene, no more gas" will be needed to illuminate rooms.

She also shows her new "wash-day marvel" that helps her do laundry in five hours, instead of two days, and she needs to get the laundry off the line before it starts raining. John initially denies that it is about to rain as his lumbago hasn't acted up, but is immediately proven wrong. Shortly after, the family's son, James, begins to talk from the right room and is scolded for using his father's Stereoscope without permission. James is watching Little Egypt dancing the "Hootchie-Cootchie". John comments that she is going to be the star of the upcoming World's Fair, and that James better put the Stereoscope away before his mother finds it. As John and James finish talking, John tells talks about owning "one of those new talking machines", after which, the family's grandmother appears on the left room, having fallen asleep while listening to the phonograph. John's attention is then drawn to a room on the right, where his daughter, Patricia, is getting ready to go to a Valentine's Day dance on the other side of town. John explains that she will be taking one of the new "horseless trolleys", before telling her that she better be home by 9 o'clock. He then mentions he's going to take one of the said trolleys downtown to have a root beer, which he explains is just a sarsaparilla with a new name.

=== Act 2: 1920s ===
The second act is set in the "Roarin' Twenties". John is once again sitting in his kitchen, this time on a smaller kitchen chair on Independence Day. Wires and new electric machines are all over the room. He says things have changed a lot in the last twenty years. He proceeds to tell guests the new accomplishments of the era, such as Charles Lindbergh about to fly over the Atlantic Ocean, sports stadiums being built all over the United States, regarding Babe Ruth as the country's best baseball player, advertisements for a film, where Al Jolson will talk and sing, electric starters replacing cranks in automobiles, and travel time from New York to California in three days.

John then tells guests that Thomas Edison has brought electricity to his home, after which, the electrical appliances all turn on at the same time, blowing a fuse, shutting the power in the house and the neighborhood. John then tells his son, Jimmy, to go put in a new fuse and power is restored. John's wife, Sarah, who is sitting on the front porch, is sewing a George Washington costume for John to wear to the town's Independence Day celebration, as her Ladies Club is in charge of the festivities. John tells the guests that the whole family will be performing in their presentation, with John and Sarah going as George and Martha Washington. Sarah is happy electric lights can be installed on the porch. Sarah tells John that Jimmy has volunteered to pick the music for the celebration. Jimmy then appears with his grandfather in the left room, dressed in a colonial outfit and standing next to a radio, which is playing patriotic music.

John tells guests that they can now get news and entertainment on their radio from all over the country. The radio programming announces crowds have begun gathering downtown for the 4th of July. After hearing this, John rushes his daughter, Patricia, to get ready. Patricia is sitting in a room on the right, wearing a Statue of Liberty costume, worrying her new boyfriend will be scared away if he sees her in her costume. John then mentions the house now has indoor plumbing which is great for cold days, especially for Uncle Orville, who is shown sitting in a bathtub on the left side of the stage. John informs guests that he has set up an air cooling system next to the bathtub, with a fan sitting in front of a block of ice, blowing on him.

=== Act 3: 1940s ===
The third act is set on Halloween during the "Fabulous Forties". John is wearing a sweater while sitting at a circular booth-style kitchen table. New kitchen technologies include a refrigerator that holds more quantity of food and ice cubes and an automatic dishwasher. John mentions he is now part of the "rat race" and they now have television, when it works, and that John Cameron Swayze brings the news every night.

The grandparents then appear on the right room, where the grandfather is sleeping and the grandmother changes the television channel to boxing. A now teenage Jim calls from his room and asks for his father's opinion on the Jack-O-Lantern he carved, to which John says it's scary; Jim remarks he used his "beautiful sister Patty" as a model. Patty is seen on the right room using an old exercise machine that was "all the rage in the twenties", while talking on the phone about her date for that night. After this, John tells the audience that he is caught up in the "do-it-yourself" craze as they are redoing their basement and making it into a rumpus room. On the left room, Sarah is putting up wallpaper using a "paint mixer" that John says he made for her, using Sarah's food mixer. As John admires his handiwork, the paint mixer goes haywire and shoots paint everywhere.

=== Act 4: 21st century ===
The fourth and final act is set during Christmas in the 21st century, with the family gathered in the living room and kitchen. John is standing in the kitchen, where he is working on Christmas dinner while Sarah is working on her computer nearby. A now-young-adult Jim and his grandmother are playing a virtual reality game while a 20-something Trish and her grandfather sit around the Christmas tree. Sarah tells John that she has programmed the oven to recognize his voice. John comments that all of the household items are now voice-automated, and Sarah demonstrates this by requesting that the Christmas tree lights be brightened. She then asks John to try the voice-activated oven, which he does with no problem as it confirms John's temperature command.

The grandmother has reached a score of 550 points in the virtual reality game, impressing both John and James, who repeat the score in awe. Upon hearing John say 550 aloud, the oven increases its temperature, although nobody seems to notice. The grandfather then remarks that he cannot believe the new gadgets that people have today. Between Trish and her grandfather, new technologies have arisen such as car phones, laser discs, high-def TVs, and automated plumbing. When the grandmother gets a high score of 975, John repeats the number out loud in front of the oven, unintentionally causing it to overheat and begin to smoke and blare warning noises before opening the door to show a severely burned and blackened turkey. John jokes that maybe in the new century, ovens will learn to read minds.

== History ==
=== Edison Square concept ===
In the late 1950s, after Disneyland's initial success, Walt Disney planned to expand the Main Street, U.S.A. area with two districts, International Street and Edison Square. In Edison Square, guests would see a show called "Harnessing the Lighting". Hosted by an "electro-mechanical" man named Wilbur K. Watt, it would chronicle the evolution of electricity in the home from the late 19th century to the present and beyond, and show how much electrical appliances—specifically, GE appliances—had benefited American life. After each time period, or "act", was over, the audience would get up and walk to the next one. The idea was eventually scrapped.

The Main Street expansion idea fell by the wayside. One reason was that technology was not yet available to achieve what Disney wanted. However, the idea stayed in Disney's mind for the next few years. GE still wanted to work with Disney, but a better outlet was needed.

=== 1964 New York World's Fair ===
General Electric approached Walt Disney to develop a show for the company's pavilion at the 1964–1965 New York World's Fair. Disney leapt at the chance to rekindle his relationship with GE, who would fund the project and the new technology necessary to bring it to life. Reaching back to the Edison Square concept, he again pitched the idea of an electrical progress show to GE executives, who loved it.

During the planning phase, Disney's Imagineers perfected the Audio-Animatronics (AA) technology necessary to operate the "performers" in the show, using technologies similar to those in Walt Disney's Enchanted Tiki Room and Great Moments with Mr. Lincoln, another attraction designed by Disney for the 1964–1965 New York World's Fair. The Imagineers, led by Disney engineers Roger E. Broggie and Bob Gurr, also devised a "carousel theater", so that the audience could stay seated and ride around a stationary set of stages, instead of getting up and walking from stage to stage. This allowed the audience to remain comfortably in place during scene changes, avoiding time-consuming disruptions between acts.

Singing cowboy Rex Allen was tapped to voice Father, the host and narrator that replaced the original "Wilbur K. Watt" character. Allen later commented that he did not know exactly what he was getting into.

Walt Disney asked songwriters Richard M. Sherman and Robert B. Sherman to create a song to bridge the "acts" in the show. When he explained what the show was about, they decided to write a song based on Disney's enthusiasm, titled "There's a Great Big Beautiful Tomorrow". The brothers later said that they considered it Walt's "theme song," because he was so optimistic and excited about the future and technology itself.

The show opened at the Fair as Progressland, and was one of its most popular pavilions. Though more than 200 people entered and exited the attraction every four minutes, it was not uncommon to wait over an hour in line. For the Fair's 1965 season, a massive covered queue was constructed next to the pavilion on an empty lot to protect visitors from New York's hot summer sun. The Carousel was also the first Disney ride with a sign that dynamically displayed wait times.

At the end of the Carousel show, fairgoers were invited to walk up to the second floor of the pavilion and see the General Electric "Skydome Spectacular". The "Skydome Spectacular" projected images of nature and energy into the domed roof of the GE pavilion, similar to a planetarium. The show demonstrated the many ways that GE was harnessing electricity and the power of the sun for the benefit of its customers. At the end of the Spectacular, in the first demonstration of controlled thermonuclear fusion to be witnessed by a large general audience, a magnetic field squeezed a plasma of deuterium gas for a few millionths of a second at a temperature of 20 million degrees Fahrenheit. There was a vivid flash and a loud report as atoms collided, creating free energy that was evidenced on instruments. The temperature listed in the 1964 guidebook was 20 million degrees F; in the 1965 guide the temperature was up to 50 million degrees F.

=== Disneyland ===
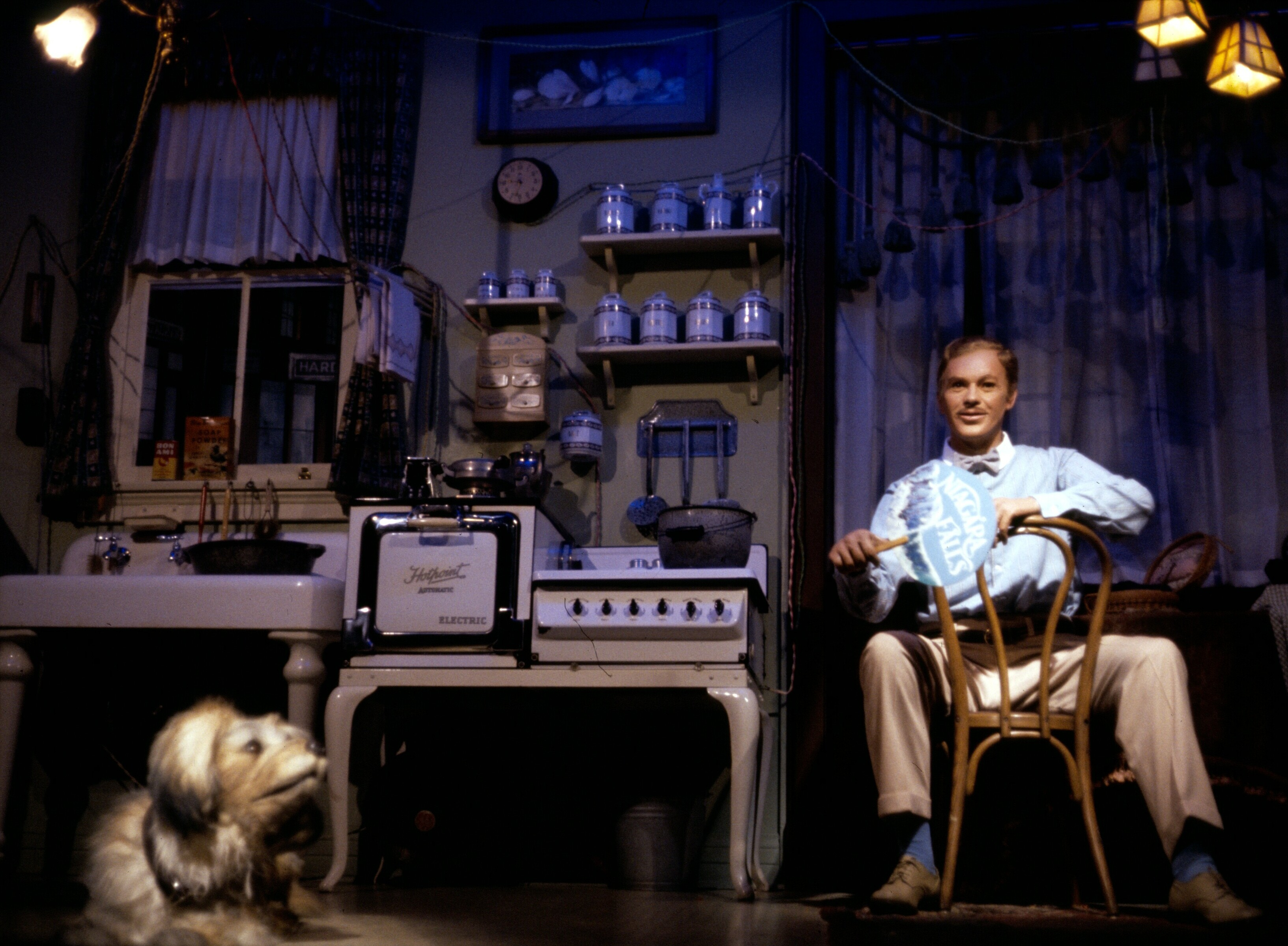
Act 2 of the 1972 Disneyland version

The Carousel of Progress reopened at Disneyland Park on July 2, 1967, with small differences from the World's Fair version. It opened nearly seven months after Walt Disney's death, as part of the New Tomorrowland. Due to the success of the attractions Disney created for the Fair, General Electric agreed to sponsor the Carousel of Progress at Disneyland as well. However, the Carousel of Progress was to be a permanent fixture at Disneyland. It is unknown how many years GE would have sponsored it had it stayed there, although it is presumed the sponsorship would have lasted 10–12 years, as many other sponsors throughout Disneyland Park had.

The actual attraction was located on ground level and a new, nearly identical theater system was constructed. The sets and Audio-Animatronic figures all came right from the Fair exhibit and remained in nearly their original states. A new voice was recorded for Mother; "Christmas in the Home of the 1960s" was slightly updated in set design and technology; all references to General Electric's passé "Medallion Home" campaign were dropped; and Father from "The Home of the 1940s" now sat on a bar stool rather than on the kitchen nook bench.

After the show, guests boarded an inclined moving walkway to the building's second level, where a 4-minute post-show, narrated by Mother and Father (with a few barks and growls from their dog) coincided with a view of an enormous animated model of Progress City, based on Walt Disney's original concept for Experimental Prototype Community of Tomorrow (EPCOT) and the Walt Disney World property.

By the 1970s, the Carousel of Progress saw dwindling audiences. GE felt that they were not getting the most for their advertising dollars, surmising that 80% of the people that saw the attraction were Californians who had seen it many times. GE asked Disney to move the show to their new Magic Kingdom at Walt Disney World. The Disneyland show closed on September 9, 1973, and was packed up for Magic Kingdom in Florida. The Progress City model was disassembled and portions of the center of it were reassembled in Florida.

In 1974 the building and its theater system were used for a new show called America Sings, a salute to American music, to celebrate America's Bicentennial. America Sings closed in 1988, and the building was closed to the public for ten years. Innoventions, a version of the Epcot attraction of the same name, opened there with the New Tomorrowland in 1998, using a stylized rendition of "There's a Great Big Beautiful Tomorrow" as its theme song. The building was then redesigned and reopened in 2015 as the Tomorrowland Expo Center, hosting the Star Wars Launch Bay.

=== Magic Kingdom ===
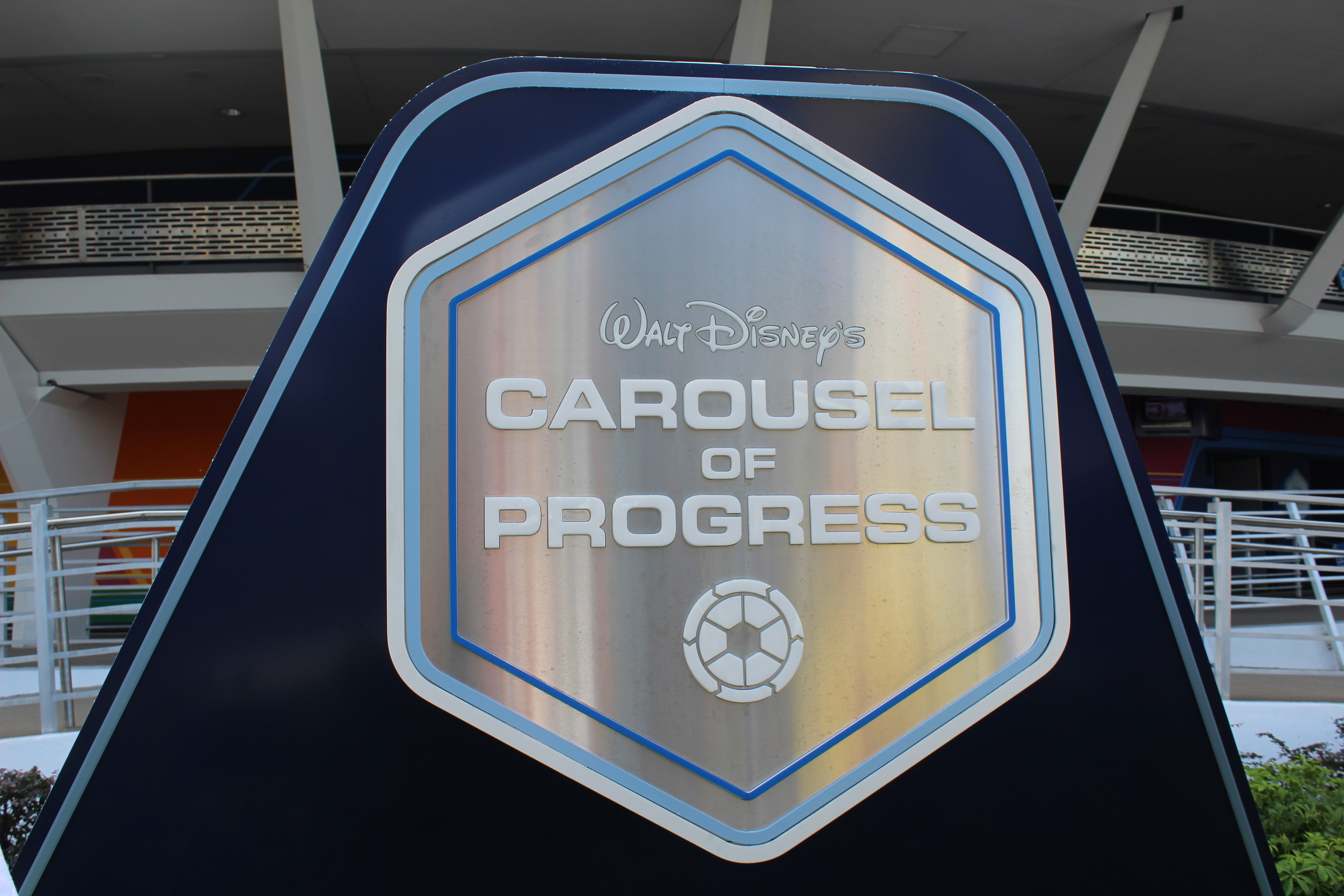
Entrance to Carousel of Progress at Magic Kingdom

Carousel of Progress opened in the Magic Kingdom's Tomorrowland on January 15, 1975, alongside Space Mountain, under a 10-year sponsorship contract with General Electric. Unlike the small changes that occurred when the show moved from the 1964–1965 New York World's Fair to Disneyland, extensive changes were made.

A new carousel theater building was designed to house the attraction: a one-story pavilion, with a loft above it used by the Tomorrowland Transit Authority PeopleMover track, wrapping around the building's north side. The interior and exterior of the building received new color schemes, with blue and white stripes that grew smaller and larger as the building turned. The theater also now rotated counterclockwise, rather than clockwise like the two former theater systems.

The load and unload theaters no longer featured the stunning "Kaleidophonic Screens" that had dazzled guests as they boarded and exited their respective theater. The old screens had stretched from one wall to the other, with the giant GE logo in the center, and lit up in various colors and patterns like a kaleidoscope as the orchestral version of "There's a Great Big Beautiful Tomorrow" played. Various problems plagued the screens after 1973, so a set of generic silver curtains with colored lights shining on the GE logo took their place in both the load and unload theaters.

The Florida version was planned so that guests loaded and unloaded on the first floor, without a post-show. The Progress City/EPCOT model was significantly downsized to fit in a window display that could be seen while riding PeopleMover. This display is located on the left side of the PeopleMover track inside the north show building which formerly housed Stitch's Great Escape!

GE wanted the attraction to have a new theme song, as they did not want their customers to wait for a "great big beautiful tomorrow", but to buy appliances today. So the Sherman Brothers created a new song, "The Best Time Of Your Life". Although it was a positive song, the brothers later said that they felt that "There's a Great Big Beautiful Tomorrow" was a better fit.

A new cast of voices and audio-animatronic "performers" were prepared for the 1975 version, including actor Andrew Duggan as Father. The first three acts had some cosmetic and set-design changes. The finale was changed to "New Year's Eve in the Home of the 1970s," and the breed of the family's dog was also changed.

In 1981, a new final act was created to showcase "New Year's Eve in the Home of the 1980s"; the rest of the show remained the same. The attraction closed briefly for the change to be implemented.

=== Post–GE years ===
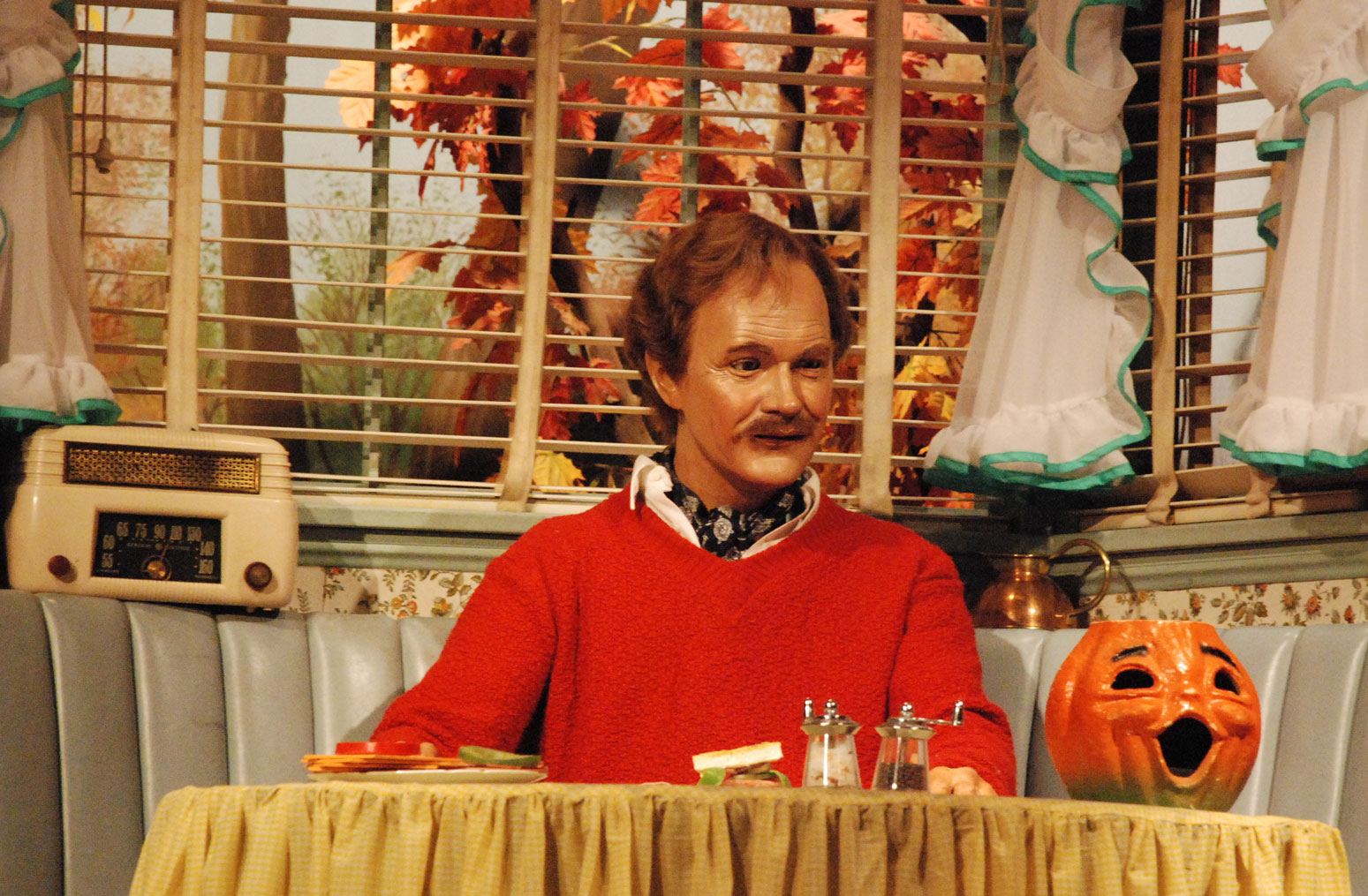
Act 3 of the Magic Kingdom version

Act 4 of the Magic Kingdom version

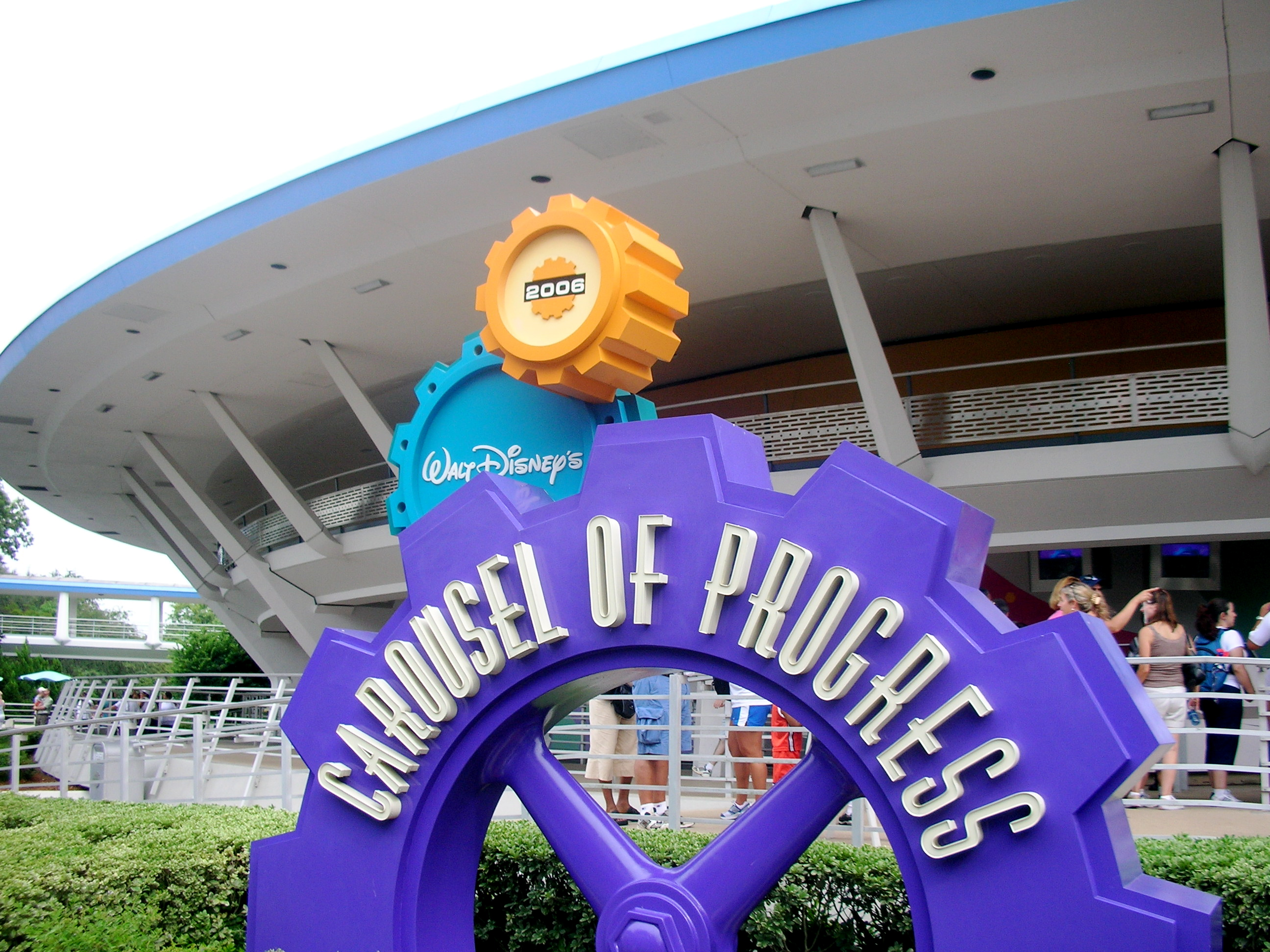
The entrance sign to the attraction prior to its 2016 refresh

On March 10, 1985, General Electric's contract expired and the company chose not to renew. The attraction closed shortly thereafter so that all GE references could be removed. The external GE logo was replaced with a design of a blueprint of the six carousel theaters surrounding the six fixed stages. The GE logo on the silver curtain was covered with a round sign with the blueprint logo and the name "Carousel of Progress". The GE logo still exists on several household appliances throughout the attraction, such as the refrigerator in Act 3.

On August 16, 1993, the attraction closed and many blueprints at the time showed a new "Flying Saucers" ride inside the show building. It was eventually decided to update the Carousel of Progress to better reflect the theme of the New Tomorrowland: "The Future that Never Was." Gears and other mechanical symbols were prominently featured throughout New Tomorrowland, so the Carousel of Progress theater was redesigned to feature them. The attraction and show were renamed Walt Disney's Carousel of Progress. A giant cog-design sign, "Walt Disney's Carousel of Progress", replaced the blueprint sign in the load and unload theaters, and the final scene was updated to "Christmas in the House of 2000" as it was envisioned in 1994. A new voice cast was hired, with American writer, raconteur and radio personality Jean Shepherd as John, the family's father, as well as the ride's narrator. Additionally, Rex Allen, the voice of the father at the original Disneyland attraction, played Grandfather in Act 4. A four-minute pre-show about the attraction's creation played on monitors while guests waited in line. A contemporary version of "There's a Great Big Beautiful Tomorrow" returned as the attraction's theme song. The attraction reopened on November 23, 1994, and was the first updated attraction for the New Tomorrowland, which was unveiled in phases. Since then, it has undergone many slight mechanical and cosmetic changes.

Due to a decrease in attendance following the September 11 attacks, Walt Disney's Carousel of Progress closed in October 2001. It reopened soon afterwards on a seasonal basis, but has remained open nearly every day of the Magic Kingdom's regular operations since 2003.

The Sherman Brothers write in their joint autobiography regarding the history of the pavilion:

Three years after Walt Disney World opened, the Carousel of Progress moved east from Disneyland to Florida, and we were invited to write a brand new theme song: "The Best Time Of Your Life". In 1994, as a special tribute to the dreams of Walt Disney the Carousel of Progress was "updated" back to its original show, featuring our original theme song, "There's A Great Big Beautiful Tomorrow".

On July 22, 2016, the gears-and-cogs paint scheme was replaced by futuristic "strikes" of various different colors. The attraction's name is now painted on the rotating part of the building.

In 2022, the animatronics in the final act got an updated wardrobe, with a few Easter eggs. For example, Patricia, the daughter now wore a collegiate sweater for "Progress Tech School of Urban Planning", in reference to Progress City, the model city that Walt Disney had in mind for Epcot. Both Trish and Jim wore slippers with designs of the reindeer characters from the Disney Christmas parade. James, the son, wore a ski hoodie with a logo for the Mineral King Ski Resort, an abandoned idea that Walt Disney had planned before his death, emblazoned on it. And John, the father, now wore a green apron that reads "My Food Rocks", in reference to the Epcot attraction Food Rocks (1994–2004). The dialogue, however, remained unchanged.

In August 2025 at Destination D23, it was announced that the ride will be getting an update. This will include a new introductory scene featuring an Audio-Animatronics figure of Walt Disney. In May 2026, it was announced that the ride would close on July 6, 2026 to install the update, and that it is expected to reopen in late Spring 2027, with new scenes and a timeline shift. At the D23 fan event in August 2026, it was announced that the attraction will feature the voices of Jamie Lee Curtis and Bryan Cranston as Sarah and John respectively. In October 2026, it was announced that Debi Derryberry, who voiced Patricia, the daughter, in the 1994 incarnation, would be returning as the Grandmother.

== Cast (1994 version) ==
Character	Voice actor
John, the father	Jean Shepherd
John's Singing Voice	Jess Harnell
Sarah, the mother	B.J. Ward
Patricia, the daughter	Debi Derryberry
James, the son (young)	Peter Nelson
James, the son (teenager)	Paul Osterhout
Grandfather	Rex Allen
Grandmother	Mary Cervantes
Grandmother (Act 4)	Janet Waldo
Uncle Orville/Parrot	Mel Blanc
Radio Personality	Noel Blanc
Talking Machine Singer	Larry Cedar
Unload Female Vocalist	Gloria Kaye
Unload Male Vocalist	Joe Pizzulo

== Soundtrack ==
The entire soundtrack for the Disneyland version (1967–1973) can be heard on A Musical History of Disneyland (2005). The soundtrack was also released as part of the 5-disc CD set Walt Disney and the 1964 World's Fair released on March 24, 2009, which includes instrumental versions of "There's a Great Big Beautiful Tomorrow" representing different eras of progress, and an early "Alternate Universe" version of the complete show. The complete 1975 "Now is the Time" version was found on Walt Disney World Forever. The 1994 theme song of the show, "There's A Great Big Beautiful Tomorrow", was previously available on the 2008 "Four Parks – One World: Walt Disney World" album and is currently available on the two-disc "Walt Disney World Resort Official Album" from 2013, along with other hard-to-find songs from the Walt Disney World parks.

The theme song "There's a Great Big Beautiful Tomorrow" was found on a few official theme park albums over the years, including:

- Walt Disney World Resort: The Official Album (1999) (Magic Kingdom 1994 version)
- Walt Disney World Resort: Official Album (2000) (Magic Kingdom 1994 version)
- The Official Album of the Disneyland Resort (2005) (Happiest Homecoming on Earth for 50th anniversary)
- Walt Disney World Resort: The Official Album

== List of inventions mentioned and/or presented in the show ==
=== Act 1: Turn of the Century (1900s) ===
- 20-story skyscraper
- Automobile
- Transcontinental railroad
- 1903 Wright Flyer
- Gas lamps
- Telephone
- Cast iron stoves
- Icebox
- Electric lights
- Washing machine
- Stereoscope
- Phonograph
- Cinema

=== Act 2: 1920s ===
- Transatlantic flight
- Sports Stadium
- Talking Movie
- Radio
- Indoor plumbing
- Electric fan
- Electric starter
- Fuse box

=== Act 3: 1940s ===
- Dishwasher
- Commuting
- Television
- Food mixer

=== Act 4: 21st century ===
- Virtual reality video games
- Voice activated oven and lights and voice recognition
- Carphone
- High-definition television
- Flat panel display
- LaserDisc

== In popular culture ==
- Horizons (Epcot) was a "sequel" to The Carousel of Progress, featuring a family in the future and showcasing speculative technology. The attraction officially closed in January 1999.
- Mike Judge's 2006 film Idiocracy features the "Time Masheen", a poorly maintained amusement park ride which presents apocryphal American history in a format similar to the Carousel.
- Disney Animation's 2007 film Meet the Robinsons features a cover of There's a Great Big Beautiful Tomorrow by They Might Be Giants.
- In the film Iron Man 2, Tony Stark promotes the "Stark Expo", a fictional version of the World's Fair. The original Carousel of Progress building can be seen on the map of the Stark Expo 2010 website as the Kodak Pavilion. The Ford Magic Skyway pavilion can also be seen nearby, north of the Fountain of Planets, incorporated as the Royal Purple Synthetic Oil Pavilion. In addition, Richard Sherman wrote the Stark Expo's theme song, "Make Way for Tomorrow Today."
- In the "Breakfast Food Killer" episode of the adult animated series Drawn Together, the characters sing "The Best Time of Your Life" three times to help them teleport from one place to another.
- The ride plays a central role in Cory Doctorow's 2011 novella The Great Big Beautiful Tomorrow, where it is preserved by the protagonist in a post-apocalyptic wasteland.
- The game Epic Mickey features the ride under the name "Great Big Tomorrow" as a segment of its Tomorrow City world, hosted by a Goof named after Rover. How Mickey defeats a miniboss inside the theater results in a different future of Tomorrow City being shown on the rotating stage.
- In the 2015 Walt Disney film Tomorrowland, during the opening scene showing the New York City World's Fair, the song "There's a Great Big Beautiful Tomorrow" can be heard.
- In the 2019 live-action version of 1941's animated Dumbo (set in 1919), characters visit an amusement park's Carousel of Progress-type attraction featuring 1930s/1940s-style "futuristic" appliances.
