= There's a Great Big Beautiful Tomorrow =

Song by Rex Allen (original Disneyland version), and Jess Harnell (current)

from the album The Music of Disney: A Legacy in Song
- Published: 1964
- Genre: Show tune
- Label: Walt Disney
- Songwriters: Richard M. Sherman, Robert B. Sherman (Sherman Brothers)

"There's a Great Big Beautiful Tomorrow" is the theme song to two Disney attractions, Walt Disney's Carousel of Progress at the Magic Kingdom of Walt Disney World (formerly at Disneyland) and Innoventions at Disneyland. It was also used in one scene of the Epcot attraction Horizons.

== History ==
The song was written by Richard and Robert Sherman for the Carousel of Progress, one of four attractions Walt Disney and his Imagineers developed for the 1964 New York World's Fair. The lead vocals were by Rex Allen, a frequent Disney narrator who also provided the speaking voice for the Audio-Animatronic host of the attraction. When the Carousel of Progress moved to Disneyland after the fair and opened in 1967, the song came with it. In 1973, the Carousel of Progress closed and moved to the Magic Kingdom at Walt Disney World in 1975.

During the move, in 1974, General Electric—the sponsor of the show—commissioned a new theme song known as "The Best Time Of Your Life", also written by the Sherman Brothers. In 1982, GE commissioned a third song from the Sherman Brothers called "New Horizons", but in the end, opted not to use it and GE's CEO wrote a song instead, which disappointed many fans of the attraction. When General Electric dropped sponsorship of Carousel of Progress in 1985, the newer song initially remained. But in 1993, Disney brought back the original theme, "There's a Great Big Beautiful Tomorrow," and renamed the attraction Walt Disney's Carousel of Progress. At that time, the song was rerecorded to feature the current voice cast, including Jean Shepherd (Speaking) and Jess Harnell (Singing) as the Father character, as can be heard on the theme park's web site. The song was also used in one scene of Horizons, the former Epcot "sequel" attraction to the Carousel of Progress.

At Disneyland, the attraction that had replaced the Carousel of Progress, America Sings, closed in 1988. The building, known as the "Carousel Theater," sat empty for ten years, until the new Tomorrowland opened on May 22, 1998. The new occupant of the Carousel Theater building, Innoventions, paid tribute to the older attraction by reviving the 1964 song until it closed in 2015. Tom Morrow (the audio-animatronic host of Innoventions) sang it at the beginning, end, and during transitions of sets. This version of the song featured new lyrics written by the Sherman Brothers in 1998, and was sung by Nathan Lane. The attraction was updated periodically to include newer elements, but still uses the original theme song between each transition. However, the different Tom Morrow scenes are not directly linked in a continuous show as the old attraction was. The original Rex Allen recording was the exit music for the ASIMO show inside Innoventions as well.

== Legacy ==
Richard Sherman was once quoted saying, "The theme song, 'Great Big Beautiful Tomorrow,' had a wonderful positiveness about it. In a way, it was Walt's theme song, because he was very positive about the future. He really felt that there was a great big beautiful tomorrow shining at the end of every day."

In an interview, Marty Sklar, the former ambassador for Walt Disney Imagineering, said: "Walt Disney was the eternal optimist, and he really believed that things could be better. And Bob and Dick Sherman wrote that song as a personal ode to Walt. They really meant it... That was Walt's anthem, and they recognized that."

== Other uses ==
Walt Disney and the Sherman Brothers sang "There's a Great Big Beautiful Tomorrow" together in a short promotional film sent to General Electric before the New York World's Fair. This can be seen in its entirety in an Easter egg on the Walt Disney Treasures Tomorrow Land DVD set. The same DVD also contains Walt Disney's filmed introduction to his original 1966 plans for EPCOT, made to convince Florida legislators, industry and the public of the value of the project. An instrumental version of "There's a Great Big Beautiful Tomorrow" is heard during much of this short film.

The band They Might Be Giants recorded a cover of the song which appears as a bonus track on the soundtrack album for the Disney film Meet the Robinsons.

In 2015, ESPN used the song for a commercial featuring the NCAA Football Signing Day. The commercial was for the ESPN-U channel and featured baseball caps of major college football programs.

It makes an appearance at the end of the short Fun with Mr. Future, sung by the titular character himself. It was also featured in the 2015 Disney movie Tomorrowland during the scene where young Frank is at the 1964 New York World's Fair.

It is featured as the closing theme for every episode of the PRX radio program The Goober Hour.

In the animated series The Wonderful World of Mickey Mouse, Mickey sings the song briefly in the episode "House of Tomorrow".

In 2025, the song was used in the final episode of The Studio.
