= Horizons (Epcot) =

Former attraction at Walt Disney World

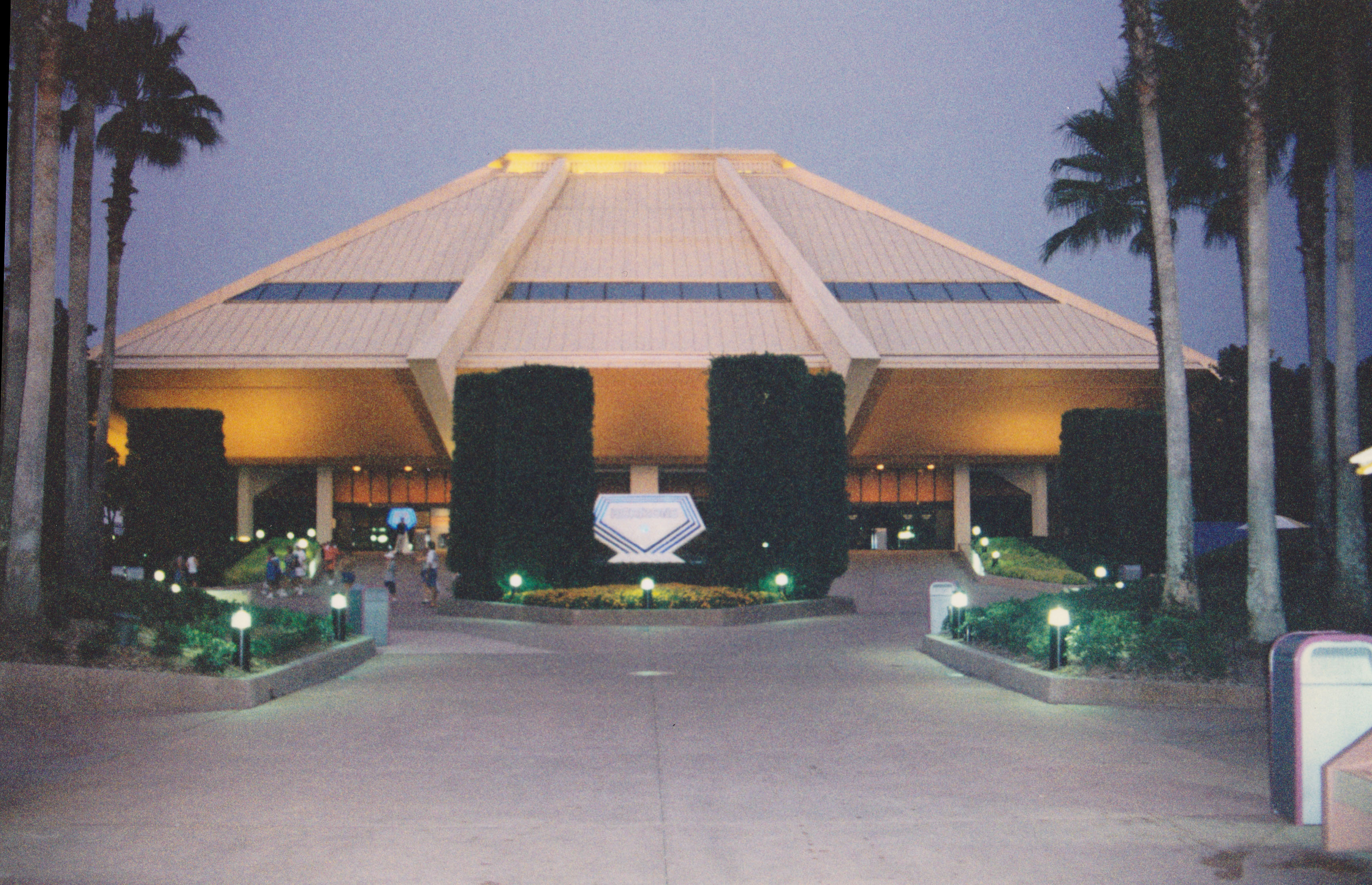
- Horizon's exterior, pictured in 1998

Epcot
- Area: Future World East
- Coordinates: 28°22′26″N 81°32′48″W
- Status: Removed
- Cost: USD $60 million
- Opening date: October 1, 1983
- Closing date: January 9, 1999
- Replaced by: Mission: SPACE (World Discovery)

Ride statistics
- Attraction type: Dark ride
- Designer: George McGinnis; Walt Disney Imagineering
- Theme: Future life
- Music: "New Horizons" by George Wilkins
- Length: 1,346 ft (410 m)
- Speed: 1.04 mph (1.67 km/h)
- Site area: 136,835 sq ft (12,712.4 m^{2})
- Vehicle type: Omnimover
- Vehicles: 175
- Riders per vehicle: 3–4
- Duration: 14:45
- Hosts: Grandfather (Bob Holt); Grandmother (Dena Dietrich)
- Sponsor: General Electric (1983–1993); None (1993–1999)
- Must transfer from wheelchair

Horizons was a suspended omnimover dark ride attraction at Epcot (then known as EPCOT Center), a theme park at Walt Disney World in Bay Lake, Florida. Located on the eastern side of the Future World (now World Discovery) section of Epcot. The attraction depicted scenes from the then yet to come 21st century showing the possible future of life on land, under the sea, and in outer space. It is believed to be a spiritual successor to Walt Disney's Carousel of Progress, an attraction in Tomorrowland at the Magic Kingdom. Horizons was the only attraction in Future World to showcase all of Epcot's "Future World" elements: communication, energy, transportation, anatomy, along with mankind's relationship with the sea and the land.

The attraction officially opened on October 1, 1983, as part of Phase II of EPCOT Center. Horizons originally closed on December 25, 1994, a little more than a year after General Electric had ended its sponsorship of the attraction. Horizons re-opened on December 24, 1995 due to the closure of two other attractions that were down for refurbishment in Future World, Universe of Energy and World of Motion. The attraction permanently closed on January 9, 1999, after which the attraction was dismantled and its structure demolished to make room for Mission: Space, a motion simulator thrill ride that opened on October 9, 2003.

== History ==
Horizons, in its concept phase, was named Century 3 (or Century III), to recognize the third century of American existence (1976–2076). The name was changed to Futureprobe to help appeal the attraction toward international guests who wouldn't understand or appreciate Century 3. In the end, the Futureprobe name was scrapped due to the medical connotation of the word "probe". After much debate, GE and Disney officials settled on the name Horizons. Prior to the start of construction, the project's budget was slashed by $10 million (USD). The building size was reduced and the length of the ride was shrunk by 35%, shortening the ride length by 600 feet (180 m).

Horizons opened exactly one year after Epcot opened and was located between World of Motion and the Universe of Energy. The Wonders of Life pavilion became Horizons' new neighbor in 1989, and World of Motion closed in 1996. Horizons remained operational until World of Motion's successor, Test Track, was ready to open to the public in early 1999.

It was proposed that Horizons would be the sequel to the Carousel of Progress (located in Tomorrowland at Magic Kingdom), Disney's ride from the General Electric Pavilion at the 1964 New York World's Fair. As the Carousel of Progress followed the changes in lifestyle that faced a family as they lived through the 20th century, Horizons continued their story, showing how they might live in the 21st century. The Carousel's theme song "There's a Great Big Beautiful Tomorrow" was part of the Looking Back at Tomorrow portion of Horizons. The version of "There's a Great Big Beautiful Tomorrow" that could be heard in Horizons coming from a television (sung by Larry Cedar) in the Art Deco scene is the exact version that was heard on a radio during the first act of the 1993-2026 version of Carousel of Progress.

The original ride concept came from Reginald Jones (then-CEO of General Electric) and Jack Welch (future CEO of General Electric). The concept was to focus on Thomas Edison and his body of work along with the origin of GE; it was changed to focus on the future of America, a theme that changed yet again to respect that EPCOT Center was to appeal to a global audience. The building which housed Horizons was designed to resemble a spaceship, while accentuating the third dimension and giving the impression of an infinite horizon.

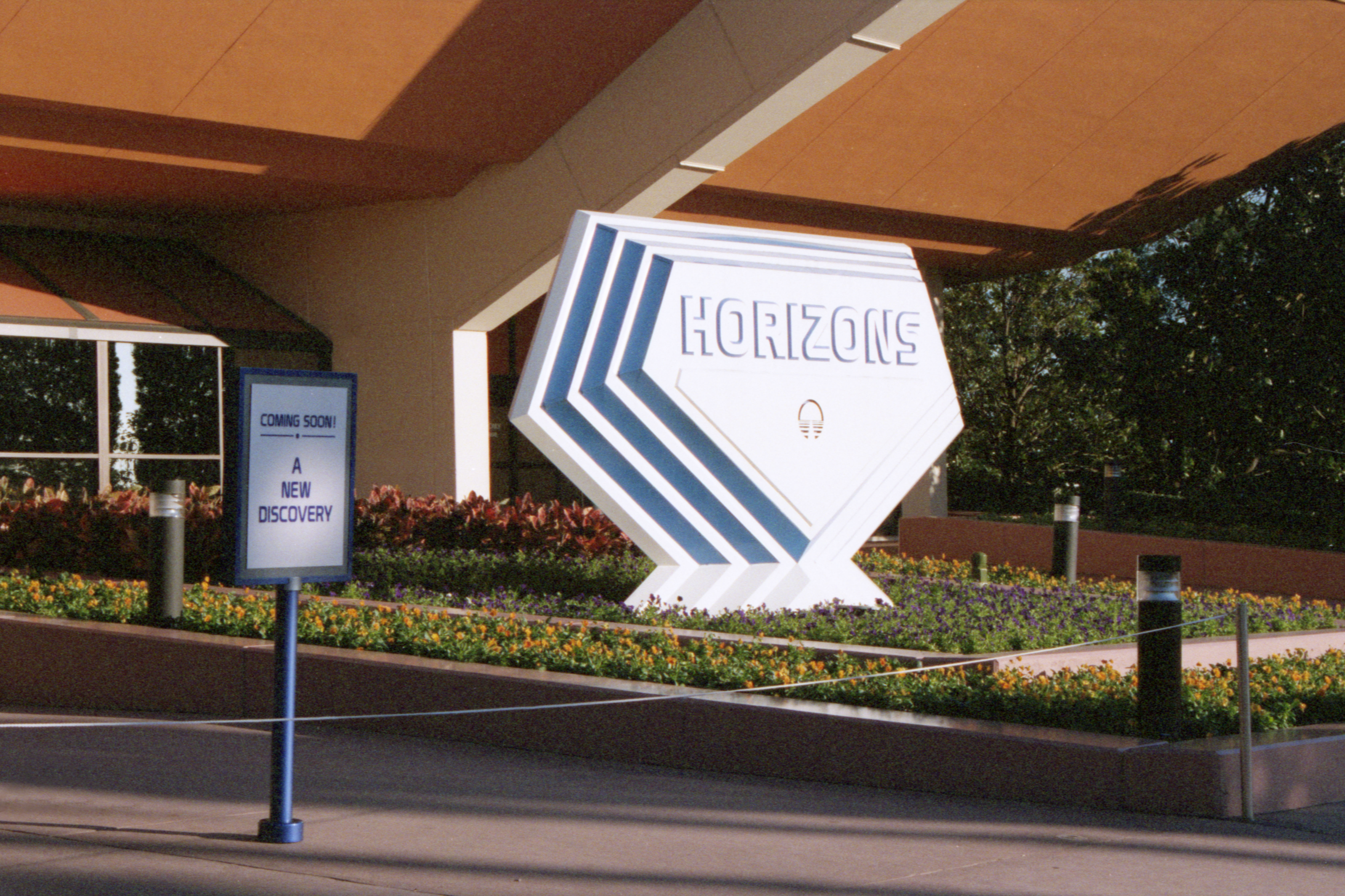
Horizons after its final closure in 1999

On June 24, 1993, it was announced that GE would not renew sponsorship of Horizons. The sponsorship's expiration occurred on September 30. Following this, all references to the company were removed. Without a sponsor, Horizons would begin to have technical issues as time went on. Several animatronics were deteriorating and the ride would frequently break down. Ideas were tossed around about the pavilion being turned into a space-themed pavilion. The building would have been upgraded and rethemed. The ride system would be changed drastically, in which the guest would be in an individual space harness while viewing space stations and space in general and would control the pitch and yaw of the vehicle. The attraction would close on Christmas Day, 1994, with no reasoning given. The attraction was left dormant for slightly under a year, before its reopening on Christmas Eve, 1995. This was due to World of Motion closing the following month for its conversion into Test Track, and Universe of Energy's refurbishment into Ellen's Energy Adventure, leaving no other attractions outside of Wonders of Life open in the east half of Future World. The attraction would operate until January 9, 1999, when it would close permanently.

No reason was publicly given, but the lack of corporate sponsorship, which happened around the same time of the financial disaster of Euro Disneyland is widely accepted as having played the largest part in the decision. Also widely speculated as a reason for the attraction closing was major structural problems, along with rumored problems with the roof.

The building stood unoccupied for well over a year as Disney decided between either relaunching the attraction (which would have required a new storyline and major building renovation and upgrades) or demolishing the building and creating a new attraction in its place. It was decided to build a new cutting-edge outer space-themed attraction, so the Horizons building was gradually torn down in July of 2000. The demolition of the building marked the first time in Disney history that an entire ride building had to be demolished in preparation for a new attraction. Construction on Mission: SPACE began in late 2000 and the new attraction opened on August 15, 2003.

Various props from Horizons used to be displayed around Walt Disney World and formerly in Walt Disney Studios Park at Disneyland Resort Paris. A display that featured the butler robot animatronic was set up in EPCOT: Creating the World of Tomorrow for Epcot's 25th anniversary. At Disney's Hollywood Studios, a few props were found in the warehouse of The Studio Tour. The mould for the desert hovercraft can be found hanging from the ceiling of a restaurant. At Walt Disney Studios Park, the desert hovercraft prop and sub pod were on display on the Backlot Tour. However, that attraction has since been replaced and the props are now missing. The McCall mural, The Prologue and the Promise, painted on canvas, was removed prior to demolition and its current whereabouts are unknown. Some artifacts from the attraction are in private collections.

== Attraction ==
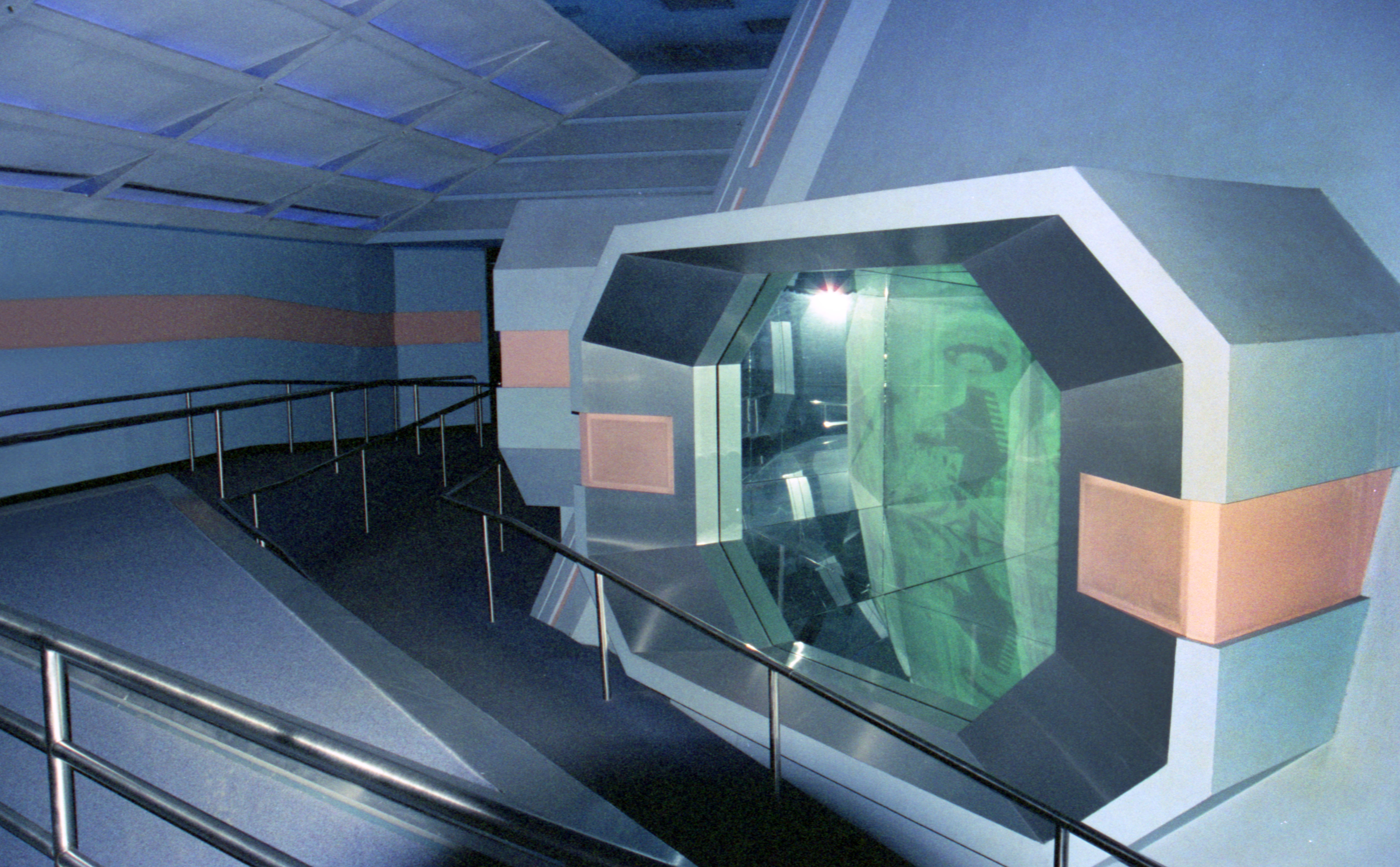
The queue in 1998

Horizons began with a section entitled "Looking Back at Tomorrow," showcasing visions of the future as perceived from the era of Jules Verne and Albert Robida through the 1950s. The ride then moved past two immense OMNIMAX screens (groundbreaking technology at the time the ride was built), showing modern technologies and ideas that could be used to build the world of tomorrow.

Afterward came the main part of the ride: visions of futuristic life in a section entitled "Tomorrow's Windows". The grandmother and grandfather live in an apartment in the city of Nova Cite. Their daughter supervises irrigation robots at the desert farm of Mesa Verde (depicting arid-zone agriculture). She then talks with her boyfriend over video chat, who is a marine biologist at the Sea Castle research base (depicting ocean colonization). At the space station Brava Centauri (depicting space colonization), everyone sings "Happy Birthday" to the narrators' grandson through holographic teleconferencing.

The only Disney attraction at the time with multiple endings, Horizons then allowed riders to select which path they wanted to take back to the FuturePort: from Brava Centauri, from Mesa Verde, or from the Sea Castle. As the final part of the ride, guests in their "omnimover" would push a button to select among the three choices and would be presented with a 31-second video sequence. A film would then be displayed to riders in each individual car. The videos showed a simulated flyover of an outdoor scene. To create the effect, scale models were built and a camera swept across the futuristic terrain. The models were some of the largest ever created at the time.

The model for the desert sequence, for example, was 32 by 75 feet (9.8 by 22.9 m) long. The visual effects were filmed in a hangar at the Burbank airport. Produced in 1983 by 30 model makers, it took over a year to build and shoot the three segments. The exit corridor of the ride originally featured the mural The Prologue and the Promise by renowned space artist Robert T. McCall.

== Voice cast ==
- Corey Burton – Futureport 'Brava Centauri' Announcer
- Henry Corden – Neon City: Screen 1 voice
- B. J. Ward – Mesa Verde Announcer, Tommy's Mother, Undersea Classroom teacher and Horizons 1 Boarding Announcer
- Dena Dietrich – Grandmother
- Tom Fitzgerald – Tom II ('Beach Boy')
- Corine Cook – Tom's Girlfriend
- Bob Holt – Grandfather

== Tributes in other attractions ==
=== Disneyland ===
Some of the attraction's robots appeared in the entry mural of Innoventions in Tomorrowland.

=== Walt Disney World Resort ===
==== Mission: SPACE ====
A number of tributes to Horizons can be found throughout its successor attraction, Mission: SPACE. The center of the gravity wheel in the queue has the attraction logo, and a stylized version also appears on the front of the checkout counter in the Cargo Bay gift shop at the exit to the attraction. Also, following the 2017 refurbishment, a new mural added to the entrance features the space station Brava Centauri orbiting the Earth.

The concrete planter west of the current attraction is a physical remnant of the previous installation where the main sign for Horizons once stood, and reflects the distinctive shape of the original ride building.

==== Space Mountain ====
Space Mountain includes a number of tributes to Horizons in its post-show:

- One of the bags in the post-show for the ride (located on guests' left at the start of the exit walkway) features the words "Mesa Verde" written on it.
- The undersea post-show scene after the desert scene is reminiscent of a scene in Horizons. This scene is the only post-show scene to be completely new in refurbishing Space Mountain. The flatscreen display in the new scene describes it as "20,000 Light Years under the Sea," a pun on "20,000 Leagues Under the Sea," which is a reference to the defunct Magic Kingdom attraction 20,000 Leagues Under the Sea: Submarine Voyage.
- The robot butler and futuristic city skyline, which is the last post-show diorama, are similar to a scene in Horizons.

==== Walt Disney: One Man's Dream ====
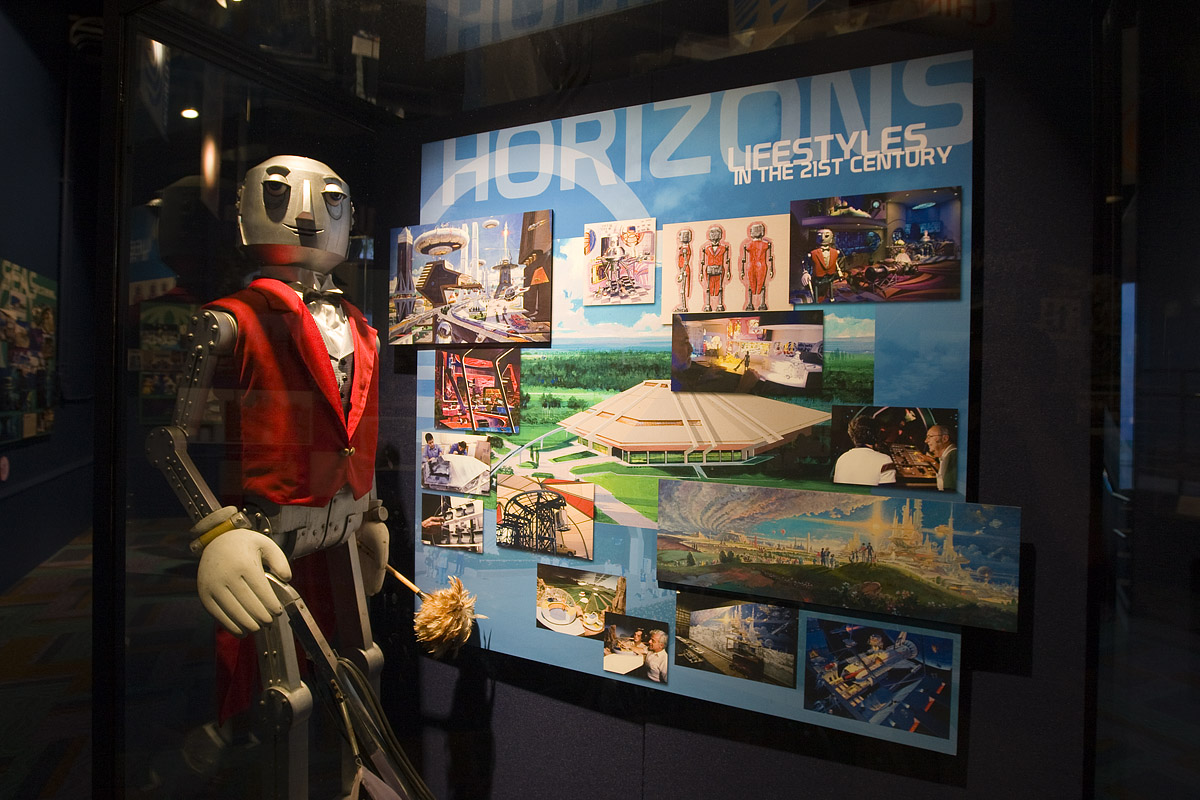
Horizons glass cased display at Walt Disney Presents at Hollywood Studios

Some of the props used in Horizons were once on display in the exhibition gallery before the short film presented at Disney's Hollywood Studios, including the famous robot butler.

==== Guardians of the Galaxy: Cosmic Rewind ====
During a portion of the queue of Guardians of the Galaxy: Cosmic Rewind, Peter Quill discusses how he visited EPCOT Center as a child and is excited to ride Horizons again (along with other former Epcot attractions), unaware it has closed, as he had not been to Earth since 1987.

=== Tokyo Disneyland ===
==== Star Tours – The Adventures Continue ====
Located at the exit of Star Tours - The Adventures Continue at Tokyo Disneyland is a kiosk featuring video of 3 other Star Tours excursions. Each different "Tour" advertised is the full 31-second sequence from the Horizons finale. The Mesa Verde, Brava Centauri Space Colony, and Sea Castle (said to be located on planet "Praya" for the purposes of tying it into the Star Wars universe) ending sequences are unedited and played in their entirety.

== Timeline ==
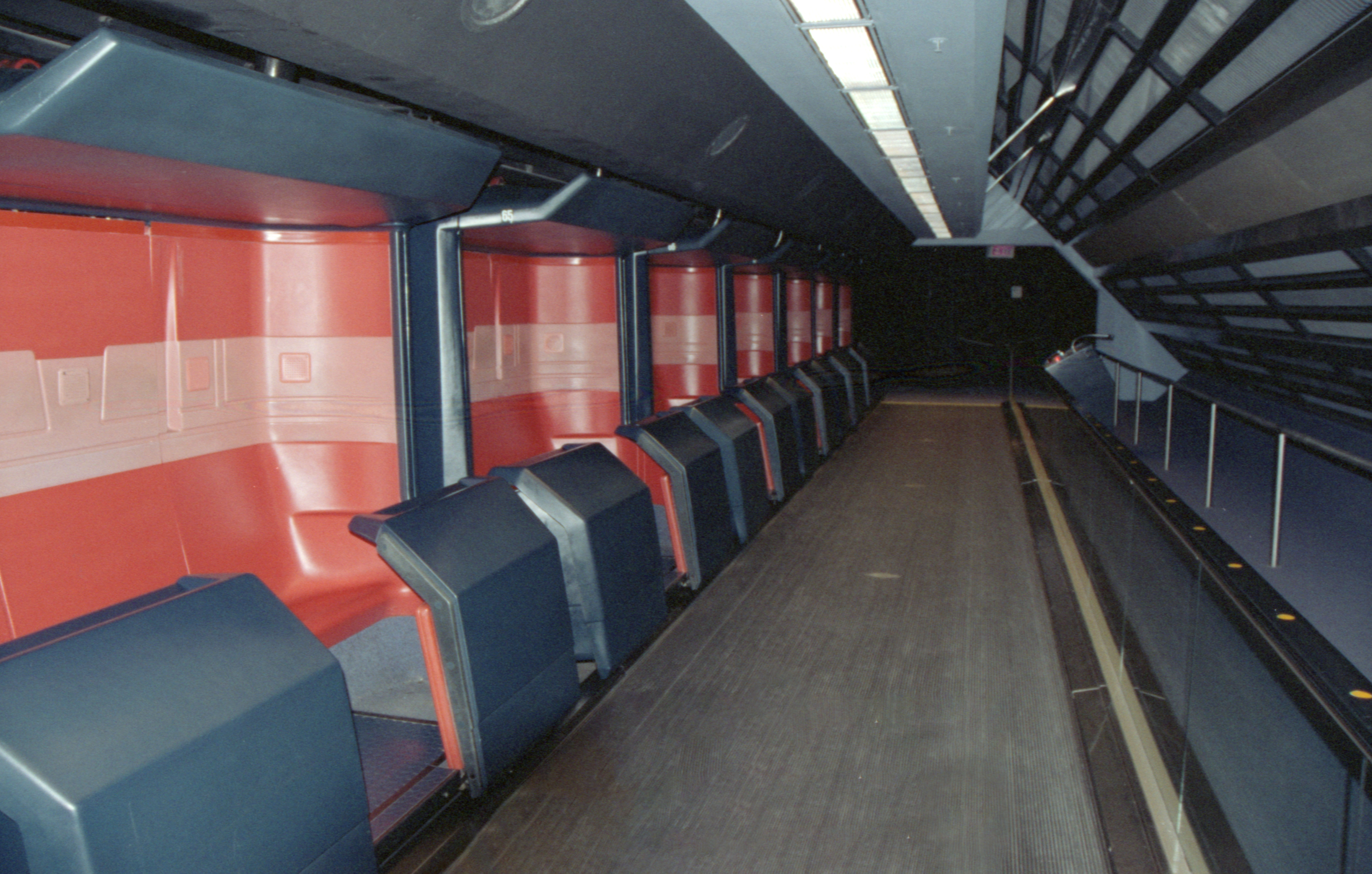
Loading area of Horizons in 1999

- 1979: early concepts were presented by the show designer George McGinnis
- August 5, 1981: site work begins
- January 1982: construction of the pavilion begins
- October 1, 1983: Horizons opens as part of EPCOT Center's 1st Anniversary celebration.
- June 24, 1993: General Electric declines to renew sponsorship.
- September 30, 1993: General Electric's sponsorship ends after expiration of 10-year contract.
- December 25, 1994: Horizons closes indefinitely. Disney officials give no timetable for reopening.
- December 24, 1995: Horizons re-opens while Universe of Energy and World of Motion are being refurbished (both these attractions remained open until January 21 and January 2, 1996 respectively).
- December 31, 1998: Disney's internal staff newsletter, Eyes and Ears, announces the permanent closure of Horizons.
- January 9, 1999: Horizons closes permanently.
- September 23, 1999: all signage for Horizons is removed.
- September 30, 1999: Horizons briefly reopens, but only for press groups.
- April 26, 2000: demolition of the Horizons building commences.
- July 25, 2000: demolition is completed.
