= Vibrating belt machine =

Exercise machine

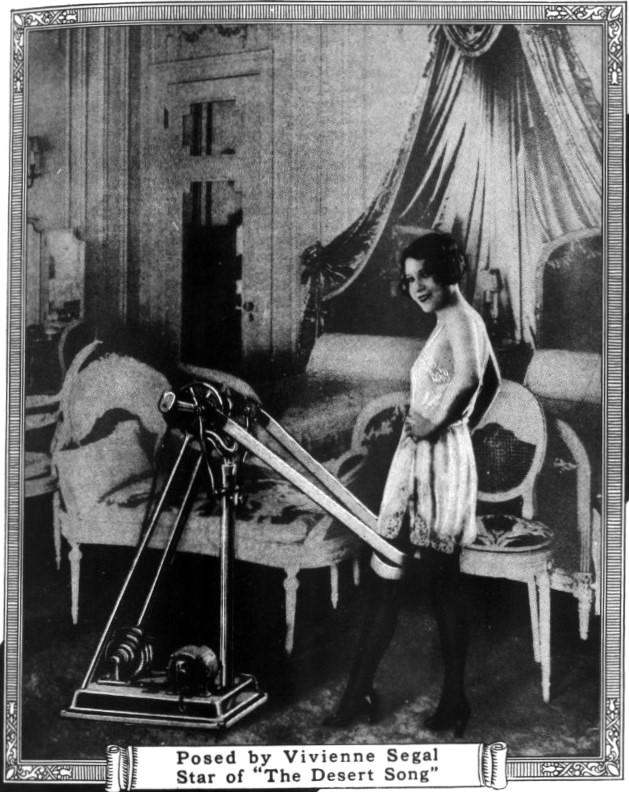
Actress Vivienne Segal using a "Battle Creek Health Builder" from an advertisement in the November 1, 1927 Vogue

A vibrating belt machine is a device that was promoted to passively reduce body fat through the use of an oscillating or vibrating belt around the exercise subject's waist, without active exercise by the user. The device was widely promoted in the 1950s and 1960s as a way to break up abdominal fat through vibration.

Early versions were devised by Swedish physician and inventor Gustav Zander in the late 19th century. Zander's machines were intended as a means of massage. Another version was promoted beginning in 1927 by John Harvey Kellogg at his Battle Creek Sanitarium, as the "Battle Creek Health Builder," with claims of additional health benefits. By the 1950s, similar devices were marketed to passively reduce fat. The devices became a common comedic element in television shows, seen in I Love Lucy and The Flintstones. They remained popular through the 1960s, but fell out of fashion by the 1980s, when it had become clear that they had no fat-reducing benefits. However, since then, portable vibrating belts started being marketed on TV infomercials even to this day (e.g. Vibro Shape).

The devices usually consisted of a platform on which the subject could stand, with a post extending upward to waist level, mounting an electric motor. One or two wide fabric belts were attached to the motor. Leaning away from the motor, a subject could "exercise" the desired portion of their body.

== See also ==
- Whole-body vibration
