= Woody's Roundup Village =

Disneyland Paris meet and greet area

Coordinates: 48°52′14″N 2°46′20″E

Disneyland Park (Paris)
- Area: Frontierland
- Status: Removed
- Opening date: 2007
- Closing date: 2011

Ride statistics
- Attraction type: Meet and Greet attraction
- Designer: Walt Disney Imagineering
- Theme: Toy Story 2
- Originally named: Critter Corral
- Wheelchair accessible

Woody's Roundup Village was a meet and greet area located in Frontierland in Disneyland Paris. It is based on the Disney·Pixar film series Toy Story. At the entrance of the farm stands a wooden house known as Woodcarver's Workshop. Originally, it was home to craftspeople carving guests' portraits on wood plaques. Although it closed in the early years of the park, it reopened with Woody's Village as a snack-delivering service. Repeatedly, projects of opening the ride Splash Mountain beside this attraction have been made, but none ever came true.

== History ==
=== Critter Corral (1992–2007) ===
In 1992, at the opening of the park, the site was home to Critter Corral, a farm part of the Cottonwood Creek Ranch, which is the farming ranch outside the mining town of Thunder Mesa. There, guests could encounter pet animals.

=== Woody's Roundup Village (2007–2011) ===
In 2007, for the Park's 15th Anniversary, the attraction was renamed Woody's Roundup Village and rethemed to the Toy Story character Woody. Animals were relocated elsewhere, and props were brought in. Guests can now encounter characters such as Sheriff Woody, Jessie or Stinky Pete. The area is also ornamented according to holidays.

In 2011, the attraction was closed to become the temporary site of Meet Mickey Mouse, as of 2013, it became unused.
