= Big Grizzly Mountain Runaway Mine Cars =

Roller coaster at Hong Kong Disneyland

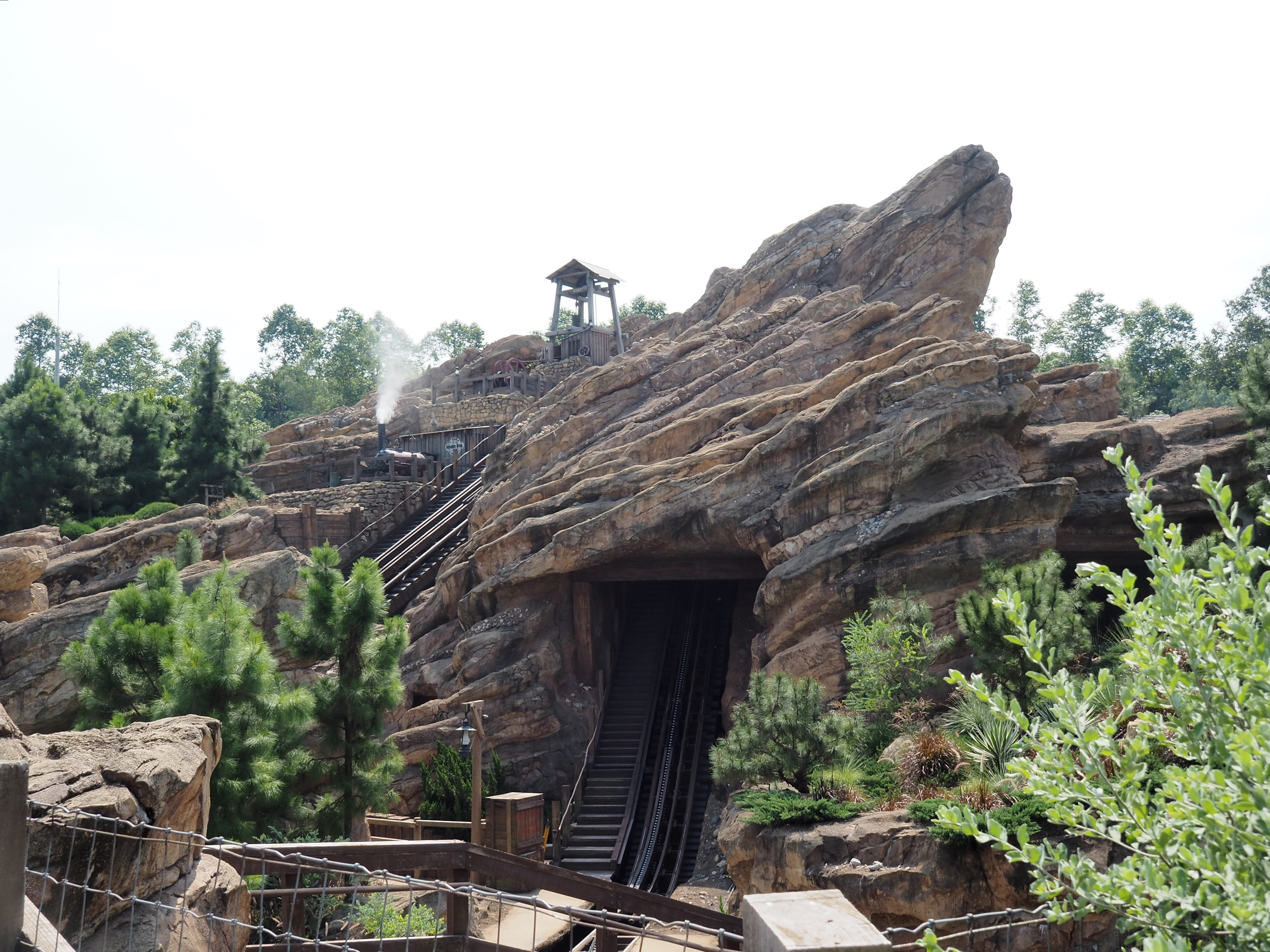

Hong Kong Disneyland
- Location: Hong Kong Disneyland
- Park section: Grizzly Gulch
- Coordinates: 22.31019°N 114.042528°E
- Status: Operating
- Opening date: 14 July 2012

General statistics
- Type: Steel – Launched
- Manufacturer: Vekoma
- Designer: Walt Disney Imagineering
- Lift/launch system: Chain Lift and Linear Induction Motor
- Length: 1,100 m (3,600 ft)
- Speed: 72 km/h (45 mph)
- Inversions: 0
- Duration: 3:14
- Capacity: 1,728 riders per hour
- Height restriction: 112 cm (3 ft 8 in)
- Trains: 6 (Usually 5 for operations) trains with 4 cars. Riders are arranged 2 across in 3 rows for a total of 24 riders per train.
- Must transfer from wheelchair
- Big Grizzly Mountain Runaway Mine Cars at RCDB

Big Grizzly Mountain Runaway Mine Cars (Traditional Chinese: 灰熊山極速礦車) is a steel roller coaster in the Grizzly Gulch section of Hong Kong Disneyland. The attraction features Audio-Animatronic bears as well as a backwards section. Big Grizzly Mountain is the second mountain and third roller coaster attraction at Hong Kong Disneyland.

== History ==
=== Planning ===
In early 2009, Hong Kong Disneyland proposed a financial arrangement to the Legislative Council of Hong Kong with the aim of expanding the park by adding three new themed areas. This plan was approved in July 2009. On 13 December 2009, the official groundbreaking ceremony took place.

=== Construction ===
The mountain, the centrepiece of the themed area, is 88 feet (27 m) tall and was constructed with 30 sculptors and 20 painters working on it for eight hours a day over a period of 14 months. The team visited California's Sierra Nevada Mountains and Yellowstone National Park before starting work. A town from the gold rush days of the 1840s and 1850s has been built around the mountain. Rocks on the mountain seem rough and eroded, but none of them are real. Instead, 3,850 tonnes of cement were used to create them. Even the bricks and "wooden" logs at the site are made from cement. The team used a special, relatively soft cement to shape the mountain's features. It is also structurally safer: the cement used to make the mountain is as strong as any cement used to build houses. To make the mountain look realistic, designers went through several exhaustive stages, including sketching, model-making, three-dimensional computer scans and adding authentic finishing touches. Two hundred people were hired in May 2012 to run Grizzly Gulch.

=== Opening ===
In June 2012, Big Grizzly Mountain Runaway Mine Cars began soft openings. On 14 July 2012, the ride was officially opened to the public.

== Ride ==
=== Overview ===
Big Grizzly Mountain Runaway Mine Cars is the centrepiece attraction in the Grizzly Gulch section of Hong Kong Disneyland. It is a Vekoma Mine train roller coaster with 1,100 metres (3,600 ft) of track.

The ride is the second Disney roller coaster to have a backwards section on it – the first being Expedition Everest in Disney's Animal Kingdom at Walt Disney World. The roller coaster also bears several similarities to the Big Thunder Mountain Railroad attractions at many Disney theme parks, with the mountain itself resembling Grizzly Peak at Disney California Adventure.

=== Experience ===
The ride begins in the Big Grizzly Mountain Mining Company building. This is home to the mining company's sawmill and one of the mining shafts, where the sounds of a snoring bear can be heard. Signage reports on recent sightings of the mountain's resident family of bears, which lead one of the original prospectors to discover the mountain's gold and the bears to be seen as a lucky charm. Upon boarding the 24 seat trains, guests are sent out of the station into tunnel 8. An animatronic grizzly bear, named Rocky, accidentally sends passengers down tunnel 4 while scratching himself on a track switch. In Chinese tradition, the number 8 signifies good luck and the number 4 signifies death, as the numbers are homonyms for characters representing luck and death, respectively.

Entering tunnel 4, the train begins to climb a lift hill in the style of a traditional roller coaster. Once the train nears the top of the mountain the lift cable appears to break (next to Shaft 44, in reality the lift cable ends) causing the riders to go back down the hill in reverse and along a different track before entering another mine. Two animatronic bears, a mother and cub named Mother Lode and Nugget, are located inside the mine and the cub sets off some TNT while reaching for a hanging catch of fish left behind by one of the miners, causing the train to launch out of the mine on yet another track. The train then goes through a variety of twists and turns before arriving at the terminal brake run and returning to the station, passing by a damaged minecar containing Mother Lode, Nugget and the fish.

== See also ==
- Hong Kong Disneyland attraction and entertainment history
- 2012 in amusement parks
- Big Thunder Mountain Railroad
- Expedition Everest
