= Frontierland =

Themed part of Disney park

- Theme: 19th Century American Frontier, American History, North America and Mexico

Disneyland
- Status: Operating
- Opened: July 17, 1955

Magic Kingdom
- Status: Operating
- Opened: October 1, 1971

Tokyo Disneyland (As Westernland)
- Status: Operating
- Opened: April 15, 1983

Disneyland Paris
- Status: Operating
- Opened: April 12, 1992

Hong Kong Disneyland (As Grizzly Gulch)
- Status: Operating
- Opened: July 14, 2012

Frontierland is one of the "themed lands" at the many Disneyland-style parks run by Disney around the world. Themed to the American frontier of the 19th century, Frontierlands are home to cowboys and pioneers, saloons, red rock buttes, and gold rushes, along with influence from American history, North America in general and a small amount of Mexican culture. It is named Westernland at Tokyo Disneyland and Grizzly Gulch at Hong Kong Disneyland.

To build an accurate depiction of an old-West town, Walt Disney sent a camera crew to Frontier Town, in North Hudson, New York, to film a movie that was used as the inspiration for Frontierland, as revealed in the book Frontier Town Then And Now.

== Disneyland ==
Original dedication

Frontierland. It is here that we experience the story of our country's past. The color, romance and drama of frontier America as it developed from wilderness trails to roads, riverboats, railroads and civilization. A tribute to the faith, courage and ingenuity of our hearty pioneers who blaze the trails and made this progress possible.

— Walter E. Disney, July 17, 1955

=== History ===
Frontierland first appeared in Disneyland as one of five original themed lands. Walt Disney envisioned the land to be a romanticized depiction of an average town during the westward expansion of America, a topic that enthralled him for his entire life. In the beginning, the land contained few attractions, but centered on open expanses of wilderness which guests traveled through by stagecoach, pack mules, Conestoga wagon, and walking trails. The Mine Train Through Nature's Wonderland opened in 1960, consisting of a sedate train ride around various western landscape dioramas. The Mine Train closed in 1977 to make way for a new attraction; the Big Thunder Mountain Railroad, which opened in 1979.

Disneyland's Frontierland gateway is constructed of ponderosa pine logs. The land's long shoreline along the Rivers of America is the viewing area for the nighttime Fantasmic! show. The docks to both the Mark Twain Riverboat and the Sailing Ship Columbia, (a replica of American explorer Robert Gray's 18th century ship that circumnavigated the globe) are located here, and Tom Sawyer Island in the river's center is also considered a property of Frontierland

On the roof of the Westward Ho Trading Co., there are elk or deer antlers. Elk antlers were commonly placed on general stores in the old west so cowboys coming into town immediately knew where to get supplies. Also in Frontierland is a building that has a large sign that says "Laod Bhang Co. Fireworks Factory". Plus, at the storefront marked "Crockett and Russel Hat Co.", there is a window honoring Fess Parker, who played Davy Crockett in Walt Disney's Davy Crockett. Frontierland borders Fantasyland (via the Big Thunder Trail), New Orleans Square and Adventureland, and connects to the Central Plaza through an iconic set of fort-style gates.

=== Attractions and entertainment ===
- Big Thunder Mountain Railroad (1979–present)
- Frontierland Shootin' Arcade (1955-present)
- Rivers of America
  - Mark Twain Riverboat (1955–present)
  - Pirate's Lair on Tom Sawyer Island (1956–present)
  - Sailing Ship Columbia (1958–present)
- Fantasmic! (1992–present)

=== Former attractions and entertainment ===
- American Rifle Exhibit & Frontier Gun Shop (1956–1986)
- Big Thunder Ranch (1986–1996, 2005–2016)
- Burning Settler's Cabin (1956–2003)
- Ceremonial Dance Circle (1955–1971)
- Conestoga Wagons (1955–1959)
- Davy Crockett Arcade (1955–1987)
- Davy Crockett Frontier Museum (1955)
- Dixieland Band Stand (1955–1961)
- El Zocalo (1958–1963)
- Festival of Fools (1996–1998)
- Fort Wilderness (1956–2003)
- Indian Village (1955–1971)
- Little Patch of Heaven Petting Farm (2004–2005)
- Marshal's Office (1955–1956)
- Mexican Village (1957–1964)
- Rivers of America
  - Mike Fink Keel Boats (1955–1997)
  - The Heartbeat of New Orleans — A Living Mural (2023–2024)
- Mineral Hall (1956–1962)
- Miniature Horse Corral (1955–1957)
- Nature's Wonderland (1960–1977)
- Painted Desert (1955–1959)
- Rainbow Caverns Mine Train (1956–1960)
- Rainbow Ridge Pack Mules (1955–1973)
- Santa's Reindeer Round-Up (2005–2007) Seasonal
- Stagecoach Ride (1955–1959)
- Woody's Roundup (1999–2000)

=== Restaurants and refreshments ===
- Golden Horseshoe Saloon
- Stage Door Cafe
- Rancho del Zocalo Restaurante
- River Belle Terrace

=== Former restaurants and refreshments ===
- Aunt Jemima's Kitchen (1962–1970)
- Aunt Jemima's Pancake House (1955–1962)
- Casa de Fritos (1955–1982)
- Casa Mexicana (1982–2001)
- Chicken Plantation (1955–1962)
- Magnolia Tree Terrace (1970–1971)
- McDonald's Conestoga Fries (1998–2007)
- New Orleans Barbecue (1956–1957)
- Oaks Tavern (1956–1978)
- Silver Banjo Barbecue (1957–1961)

=== Shops ===
- Bonanza Outfitters
- Westward Ho Trading Company
- Pioneer Mercantile
- Silver Spur

=== Former shops ===
- Frontier Trading Post (1955–1987)
- Pendleton Woolen Mills Dry Goods Store (1955–1990)
- Malt Shop & Cone Shop (1958–1970)
- Quasimodo's Attic (1996–1997)

== Magic Kingdom ==
Frontierland at Magic Kingdom debuted with three attractions: the Walt Disney World Railroad station, Davy Crockett's Explorer Canoes (which operated until 1994) and the world debut of the Country Bear Jamboree (which was permanently closed in 2024 to make way for Country Bear Musical Jamboree). Tom Sawyer Island opened in 1973. The northwestern end of the park was supposed to receive a pavilion-style "E ticket" attraction, which was never built. The area sat empty until Big Thunder Mountain Railroad premiered in 1980.

Few changes would be made until 1991, when Splash Mountain, based on the animated sequences from Disney's 1946 film Song of the South, was built on the vacant land between Big Thunder Mountain Railroad and the Walt Disney World Railroad station and parade access road, necessitating the relocation of the railroad's station. Splash Mountain and a new two-story railroad station opened on October 2, 1992. Frontierland borders Adventureland on the south, Liberty Square on the east, and formerly the Rivers of America on the north.

In June 2020, Disney announced that they would be reworking Splash Mountain into a new ride, based on Disney Animation's 2009 film, The Princess and the Frog. Splash Mountain closed on January 23, 2023. Tiana's Bayou Adventure officially opened on June 28, 2024.

On June 13, 2024, Disney announced that Magic Kingdom version of Frontierland Shootin' Arcade would permanently close on June 23, 2024 to make way for a new Disney Vacation Club Member lounge, McKim's Mile House, which would be open on March 18, 2025.

In August 2024, it was announced that an area themed to the American wilderness from Pixar's Cars franchise would be added to Frontierland, which will replace Tom Sawyer Island and the Rivers of America. In June 2025, it was announced that Tom Sawyer Island and the Rivers of America would close on July 7, 2025, to make way for Piston Peak National Park. During that time, the Walt Disney World Railroad will be temporarily run in Shuttle Mode with some reserved seats and Frontierland Station will be closed due to the construction. In August 2026, it was revealed that the attractions in the Cars area will include Miss Fritter's Daredevil Spin-Along and Cars Ridge Run Rally.

=== Attractions and entertainment ===
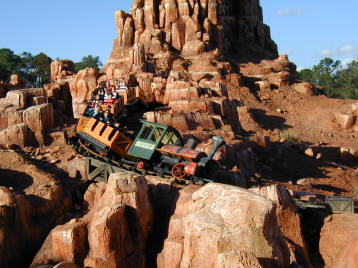
Big Thunder Mountain at Magic Kingdom

- Big Thunder Mountain Railroad (1980—present)
- Tiana's Bayou Adventure (2024—present)
- Country Bear Musical Jamboree (2024–present)
- Disney Vacation Club lounge (2025—present)
- The Diamond Horseshoe
  - Jessie's Roundup: A Rip-Roarin' Revue (2026–present; seasonals)

==== Upcoming attractions and entertainment ====
- Piston Peak National Park
  - Miss Fritter's Daredevil Spin-Along
  - Cars Ridge Run Rally

=== Former attractions and entertainment ===
- Country Bear Jamboree (1971–1986, 1992–2012, 2012–2024)
  - Country Bear Christmas Special (1984—2005; seasonals)
  - Country Bear Vacation Hoedown (1986—1992: seasonals)
- Rivers of America
  - Davy Crockett's Explorer Canoes (1971—1994)
  - Tom Sawyer Island (1973—2025)
- The Diamond Horseshoe
  - Diamond Horseshoe Revue (1971–1986)
  - Diamond Horseshoe Jamboree (1986–2003)
  - Goofy's Country Dancing Jamboree (2003–2005)
- Splash Mountain (1992—2023)
- Frontierland Shootin' Arcade (1971–2024)

=== Restaurants and refreshments ===
- Pecos Bills Tall Tale Inn
- The Diamond Horseshoe
- Golden Oak Outpost

=== Former restaurants and refreshments ===
- The Long Mile Bar
- Aunt Polly's
- Westward Ho

=== Shops ===
- Frontierland Mercantile
- Critter Co-Op
- Tiana’s Bayou General
- Prairie Outpost and Supply

=== Former shops ===
- Briar Patch
- Splashdown Photos
- Frontierland Woodcarving Shop (replaced with DVC Kiosk)
- Trail Creek Traders Hat Shop
- Big Al's

== Tokyo Disneyland ==
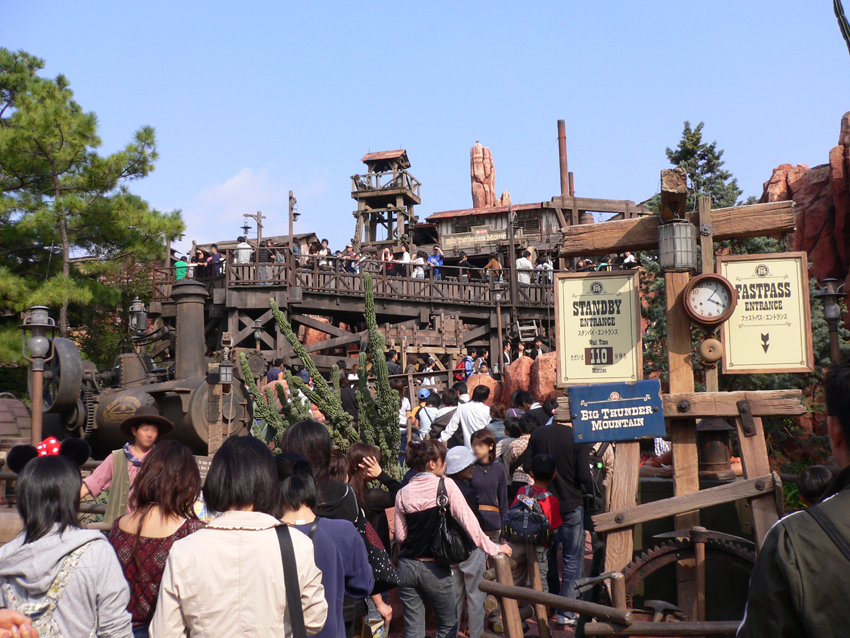
Big Thunder Mountain at Tokyo Disneyland

Tokyo Disneyland's area is known as Westernland, as "frontier" does not adequately translate into the Japanese language. The Mark Twain sails this park's Rivers of America. Other than differences in placement, and minor variations in color, theming and name, the land is similar to the Frontierland and Liberty Square areas of the Magic Kingdom.

=== Attractions and entertainment ===
- Big Thunder Mountain (1987–present)
- Country Bear Theater (1983–present)
  - Jingle Bell Jamboree (1988–present; seasonals)
  - Vacation Jamboree (1994–present; seasonals)
- Horseshoe Roundup
- Rivers of America
  - Mark Twain Riverboat (1983–present)
  - Tom Sawyer Island Rafts (1983–present)
- The Diamond Variety Muster
- Westernland Shootin' Gallery

=== Former attractions and entertainment ===
- Rivers of America
  - Davy Crockett Explorer Canoes (1983-1992)
- Plaza Pavilion Bandstand
  - Swing & Sing (1984-1998)
  - Plaza Stomp (1989-1990)
  - Plaza Playtime (1991-1995)
  - Funderful Wonderful Friends (1995-1998)
  - Jazz Magic Bandstand (daytime show) (1997)
  - Moonlight Memory (nighttime show) (1997)
  - Super-Duper Jumpin' Time (2005-2018)
- Lucky Nugget Stage (1987-2015)
  - Lucky Nugget Stampede (1991-1993)
  - Kickin' Country (1997-2000)
  - Goldtown Follies (2000-2001)
  - Happy Halloween Amigos! (2014)
- Pecos Goofy's Frontier Revue
- The Diamond Horseshoe
  - The Diamond Horseshoe Presents "Mickey & Company"
- Wild West Chance (2016-2018)
- Roundup and Play (2016-2018)

=== Restaurants and refreshments ===
- Cowboy Cookhouse
- Camp Woodchuck Kitchen
- Hungry Bear Restaurant
- Plaza Pavilion Restaurant
- Pecos Bill Cafe
- The Diamond Horseshoe

=== Former Restaurants and refreshments ===
- The Canteen (-2019)
- Chuck Wagon (-2019)

=== Shops ===
- Frontier Woodcraft
- Western Wear
- General Store
- Westernland Picture Parlour
- Trading Post
- Country Bear Bandwagon
- Happy Camper Supplies

== Disneyland Park (Paris) ==
Frontierland in Disneyland Park, Paris

Located in the area that is traditionally occupied by Adventureland, Frontierland at Disneyland Park opened with Euro Disneyland in 1992. Unlike all of the other instances, this instance has an elaborate backstory concerning the town of Thunder Mesa, founded by Henry Ravenswood to support the mining of Big Thunder Mountain. This backstory also serves as the foundation for several of the attractions, such as Phantom Manor, a version of the popular Haunted Mansion attraction that can be found at some of the other parks featuring a Western theme and a darker tone to fit in with the rest of Frontierland. The land is the largest of all of the Frontierlands thus far, containing the entire Rivers of the Far West within its borders.

Two riverboats circle the river here, the Molly Brown and the Mark Twain and can be boarded at the Thunder Mesa Riverboat Landing. Critter Corral was an old area of the land converted into Woody Roundup, a meet and greet area with Woody from Toy Story along with Jessie and Bullseye from Toy Story 2. On the shores of the Rivers of the Far West is Frontierland Playground (formerly named Pocahontas Indian Village), a children’s playground themed to resemble a traditional Native American village. The land is converted into 'Halloweenland' in October, with many pumpkins and other scary characters lurking around every corner. Frontierland borders Adventureland and the Central Plaza of Main Street, U.S.A. via Fort Comstock.

In October 2008, Jack Skellington and Sally from the 1993 film The Nightmare Before Christmas made appearances as meet and greet characters in Halloween and Christmas overlay. They are situated outside Phantom Manor.

=== Attractions and entertainment ===
- Rivers of America
  - Big Thunder Mountain (1992–present)
  - Thunder Mesa Riverboat Landing (1992–present)
- Disneyland Railroad - Frontierland Depot (1992–present)
- Legends of the Wild West (1993–present)
- Phantom Manor (1992-2018 and 2019–present)
- Frontierland Playground (formerly Pocahontas Indian Village)
- Rustler Roundup Shootin' Gallery
- The Lucky Nugget Orchestra

=== Former attractions and entertainment ===
- Critter Corral (1992–2006)
- The Chaparral Theater
  - Pocahontas le Spectacle
  - Tarzan: The Encounter
  - Mickey's Winter Wonderland
  - Goofy Summer Camp
  - "La Forêt de l'Enchantement: Une aventure musicale Disney"
  - "Frozen Sing-Along”
- Woodcarver's Workshop
- Frontierland Theater
  - The Lion King: Rhythms of the Pride Lands
- Rivers of America
  - Indian Canoes
- Woody's Roundup Village
- Meet Mickey Mouse (Temporary)
  - River Keel Boats

=== Restaurants and refreshments ===
- The Lucky Nugget Saloon
- Last Chance Café
- Sleepy Hollow Refreshments
- Silver Spur Steakhouse
- Casa de Coco - Restaurante de Familia
- Cowboy Cookout Barbecue

=== Shops ===
- Thunder Mesa Mercantile Building
  - Tobias Norton & Sons
  - Bonanza Outfitters
  - Eureka Mining Supplies
- Big Thunder Photographer
- Pueblo Trading Post

== Hong Kong Disneyland ==
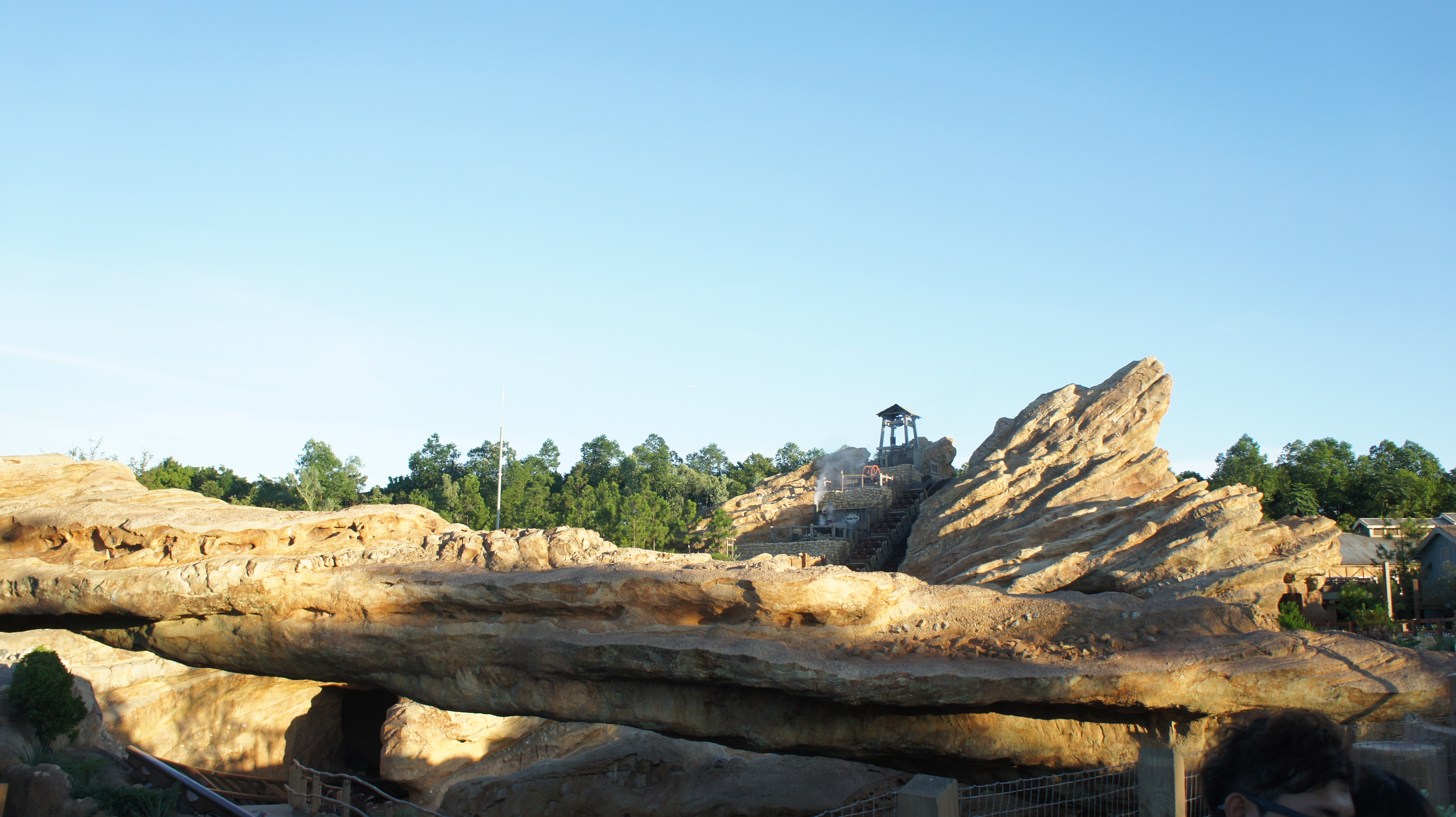
Big Grizzly Mountain at Hong Kong Disneyland

In 2012, Grizzly Gulch (Cantonese: 灰熊山谷) opened as the park's equivalent to Frontierland. Grizzly Gulch is much smaller compared to the "Frontierlands" of other Disney Parks, featuring only one ride, Big Grizzly Mountain Runaway Mine Cars. This roller coaster attraction provides a cross between the Big Thunder Mountain Railroads of the classic Frontierlands with elements from Expedition Everest, featuring special ride elements unique to this attraction, including backwards portions, and a high speed launch section.

Grizzly Gulch is themed as a Northern California mining town established on August 8, 1888, a founding date chosen as "the luckiest day of the luckiest month of the luckiest year". Though geyser fields disrupted the initial settlements, the town eventually found success when a family of bears lead one of the prospectors to a bountiful gold find, resulting in the establishment of the Big Grizzly Mountain Mining Company. The bears were declared as being a lucky charm for the town and were given protected status, despite their activity occasionally disrupting work in the mines.

=== Attractions and entertainment ===
- Big Grizzly Mountain Runaway Mine Cars (2012–present)
- Geyser Gulch
- Hong Kong Disneyland Railroad - Grizzly Gulch Station
- Welcome Wagon Show
- Wild West Photo Fun

=== Restaurants and refreshments ===
- Lucky Nugget Saloon

=== Shops ===
- Bear Necessities
