= Big Thunder Mountain Railroad =

Roller coaster at Disney parks

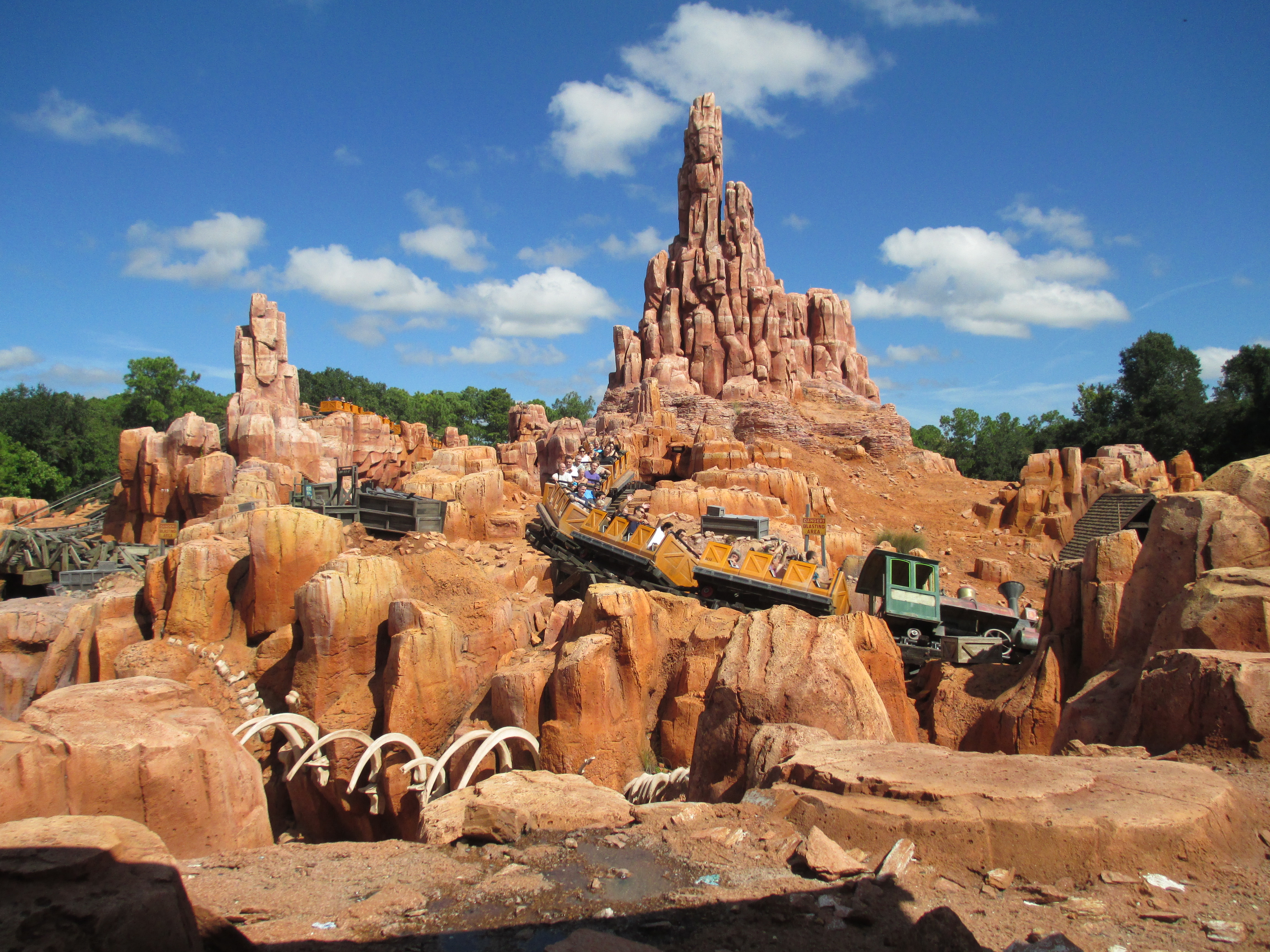
- Big Thunder Mountain Railroad at Walt Disney World

Disneyland
- Park section: Frontierland
- Coordinates: 33.8130°N 117.9204°W
- Status: Operating
- Opening date: September 2, 1979; 47 years ago
- Replaced: Mine Train Through Nature's Wonderland
- Height restriction: 40 in (102 cm)
- Lightning Lane available
- Big Thunder Mountain Railroad at Disneyland at RCDB

Magic Kingdom
- Park section: Frontierland
- Coordinates: 28.4205°N 81.5848°W
- Status: Operating
- Opening date: November 15, 1980; 46 years ago
- Height restriction: 38 in (97 cm)
- Lightning Lane available
- Big Thunder Mountain Railroad at Magic Kingdom at RCDB

Tokyo Disneyland
- Park section: Westernland
- Coordinates: 35.6326°N 139.8839°E
- Status: Operating
- Opening date: July 4, 1987; 39 years ago
- Height restriction: 102 cm (3 ft 4 in)
- Big Thunder Mountain Railroad at Tokyo Disneyland at RCDB

Disneyland Park (Paris)
- Park section: Frontierland
- Coordinates: 48.8707°N 2.7756°E
- Status: Operating
- Opening date: April 12, 1992; 34 years ago
- Height restriction: 102 cm (3 ft 4 in)
- Disney Premier Access available
- Big Thunder Mountain Railroad at Disneyland Park (Paris) at RCDB

General statistics
- Type: Steel – Mine train
- Designer: Walt Disney Imagineering
- Model: Mine train
- Track layout: Custom
- Lift/launch system: Chain lift hill
- Height: 104 ft (32 m)
- Speed: 35 mph (56 km/h)
- Inversions: 0
- Duration: ~3:00
- Trains: 5 trains with 5 cars; riders arranged 2 across in 3 rows for a total of 30 riders per train
- Manufacturer: Arrow Development (Original versions in California and Florida); Dynamic Structures (2014 California rebuild); Vekoma (2026 Florida rebuild, Paris, Tokyo)
- Restraints: Single lap bar
- Sponsor: Dai-ichi Life (Tokyo Disneyland)
- Single rider line not available
- Must transfer from wheelchair

Big Thunder Mountain Railroad is a mine train roller coaster located at four Disney theme parks. Designed by Walt Disney Imagineering, led by Imagineer Tony Baxter, the first two installations were constructed by Arrow Development, which opened at Disneyland and Walt Disney World in 1979 and 1980, respectively. The ride was later added to Tokyo Disneyland in 1987 and Disneyland Park at Disneyland Paris in 1992, both of which were built by Vekoma and named Big Thunder Mountain.

The origin design from Baxter was developed to replace Mine Train Through Nature's Wonderland, a railroad attraction that operated in Frontierland at Disneyland from 1956 through 1977. The installation at each location has several unique characteristics, although the ride layout at Magic Kingdom in Disney World is nearly identical to the one at Disneyland. Its theme centers on the American Southwest and a fictional rail line used to transport gold to a small mining town.

== Theme ==
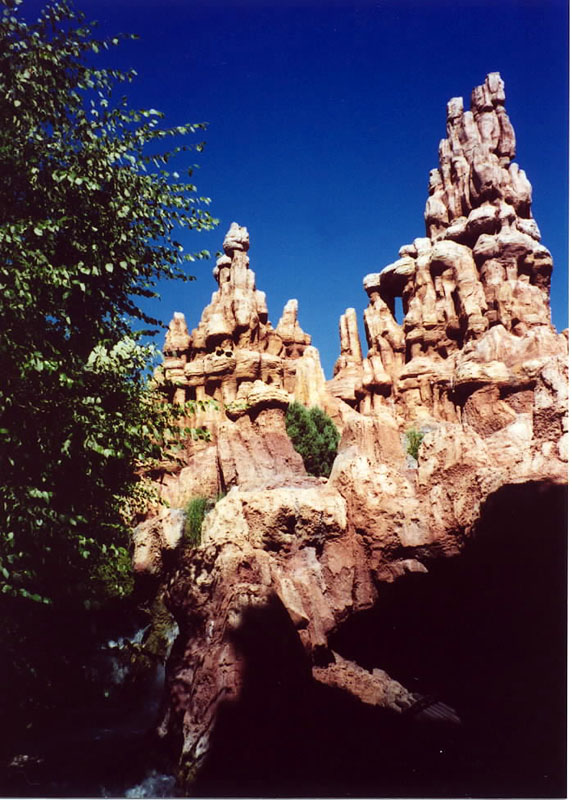
Inspired by real-life Bryce Canyon, the Hoodoos of Big Thunder in Disneyland as seen from the Big Thunder Trail that passes behind the ride.

Although the details of the backstory vary from park to park, all follow the same general story arc. Sometime in the late 1800s, gold was discovered on Big Thunder Mountain in the American Southwest. Overnight, a small mining town became a thriving one (Rainbow Ridge in Disneyland; Tumbleweed in Magic Kingdom; Thunder Mesa in Disneyland Park Paris) under the thumb of the greedy mining company owner (Barnabas T. Bullion in the American versions, Henry Ravenswood in Disneyland Park Paris). Mining was prosperous, and an extensive line of mine trains was set up to transport the ore. Unknown to the settlers, the mountain was a sacred spot to local Native Americans and was cursed.

Before long, the settlers' desecration of the mountain caused a great tragedy, which, depending on the park, is usually depicted to be an earthquake (Disneyland and Disneyland Park Paris), a tsunami (Tokyo Disneyland), or a flash flood (Magic Kingdom), which befell the mines and town, and the town was abandoned. Some time later, the locomotives were found to be racing around the mountain on their own, without engineers or a crew. The Big Thunder Mountain Railroad was founded in the old mining camp to allow wanderers to take rides on the possessed trains.

The detailed backstory, while present in park literature and training materials, is not communicated to park guests directly. The station buildings on all four versions of the ride are themed to the appearance of a mining company office from the mid to late 19th century. In the Disneyland park, there is music and laughing in one of the saloons of Rainbow Ridge, and a typewriter is heard from a newspaper office. The mountains themselves are themed to the red rock formations of the American Southwest. The rock work designs in the Disneyland version are based on the hoodoos of Bryce Canyon National Park in Utah. In the Magic Kingdom, Tokyo and Paris versions of the ride, the rockwork designs are based on the rising buttes that are located in Arizona and at Monument Valley in Utah. The attraction was designed to make it appear that the rocks were there originally, and the track was built around the rocks, unlike a number of earlier mine rides, which were built the other way around (by sculpting the rocks around the tracks). There is also a dinosaur skeleton that the train passes by in all versions of the ride except the Paris version. A cracked eggshell is nearby, and there is a lake with water that is shot up while the train passes on the warmer days. Sound effects of a typical locomotive operation are piped into the surrounding scenery to add realism to guests viewing the ride from observation platforms, including the steam whistle sounding.

== History ==
Big Thunder Mountain Railroad was designed by Imagineer Tony Baxter and ride design engineer Bill Watkins. The concept came from Baxter's work on fellow Imagineer Marc Davis's concept for the Western River Expedition, a western-themed pavilion at the Magic Kingdom, designed to look like an enormous plateau and contain many rides, including a runaway mine train roller coaster. However, because the pavilion as a whole was deemed too expensive in light of the construction and 1973 opening of Pirates of the Caribbean, Baxter proposed severing the mine train and building it as a separate attraction.

The Big Thunder Mountain Railroad project was put on hold again in 1974 as resources and personnel were being diverted to work on constructing Space Mountain in Tomorrowland, but this delay may have ultimately produced a smoother ride as the use of computers in attraction design was just beginning when the project was resumed. Big Thunder Mountain Railroad was one of the first Disney rides to utilize computer-aided design. Four of Disney's parks feature the attraction. It first opened at Disneyland in 1979, and then a larger version debuted at Magic Kingdom in Florida in 1980. Tokyo Disneyland's version opened in 1987. Disneyland Paris opened with its version in 1992, of which its layout and structure is primarily based on the Florida version of the ride. The Disneyland Paris installation is also the only Big Thunder Mountain to have been an opening-day attraction at its park.

In August 2018, the Paris location got a single rider line. Guests take the normal line and a cast member directs them either towards the single rider entrance or the normal pathway at the level of the panel located a little before the covered line. Less than two years later, a single rider line was also added to the Tokyo location in January 2020. In 2024, the Walt Disney Company announced that the Magic Kingdom location was planned to close for a year-long renovation beginning on January 6, 2025.

=== Tributes to predecessor ===
At Disneyland, Big Thunder Mountain Railroad was built on the land the Mine Train Through Nature's Wonderland used to occupy. Several tributes to the former attraction are present in the Disneyland version. A scaled-down Western town sits adjacent to the queuing lines and tracks near the station. A Western saloon, hotel, assayer's office and mercantile appear among the buildings. This is the village of Rainbow Ridge, which used to overlook the loading platform of the sedate Mine Train through Nature's Wonderland. Many of the animal animatronics throughout the attraction were reused from the previous attraction. Other allusions to the Mine Train through Nature's Wonderland include the Rainbow Caverns (glowing pools of water by the first lift hill) and precariously balanced rocks in the third lift hill tunnel.

The name of the ride itself, "Big Thunder", was originally the name of a large waterfall the old mine train passed on its tour. "Little Thunder" was located nearby.

=== Name ===
At the Magic Kingdom and at Disneyland, the ride is known by its full name of "Big Thunder Mountain Railroad". The Tokyo and Paris versions drop the word "Railroad", although the full name is still present on the trains.

=== Kidney stones ===
In the October 2016 Journal of the American Osteopathic Association, a paper entitled "Validation of a Functional Pyelocalyceal Renal Model for the Evaluation of Renal Calculi Passage While Riding a Roller Coaster" was published. The paper's author, Dr. Wartinger, found that patients of his had passed kidney stones after riding Big Thunder Mountain Railroad at Walt Disney World on vacation, including one who passed three stones on three separate occasions. The doctor then tested this result, with the permission of Disney, with a 3D model of a kidney by riding the ride over 20 times. The study found nearly 70% of the time, the kidney stone was passed, with results varying depending on which row they were seated. The study also found that Space Mountain and Rock 'n' Roller Coaster Starring Aerosmith failed to cause this result.

== Ride variations ==
=== Disneyland ===
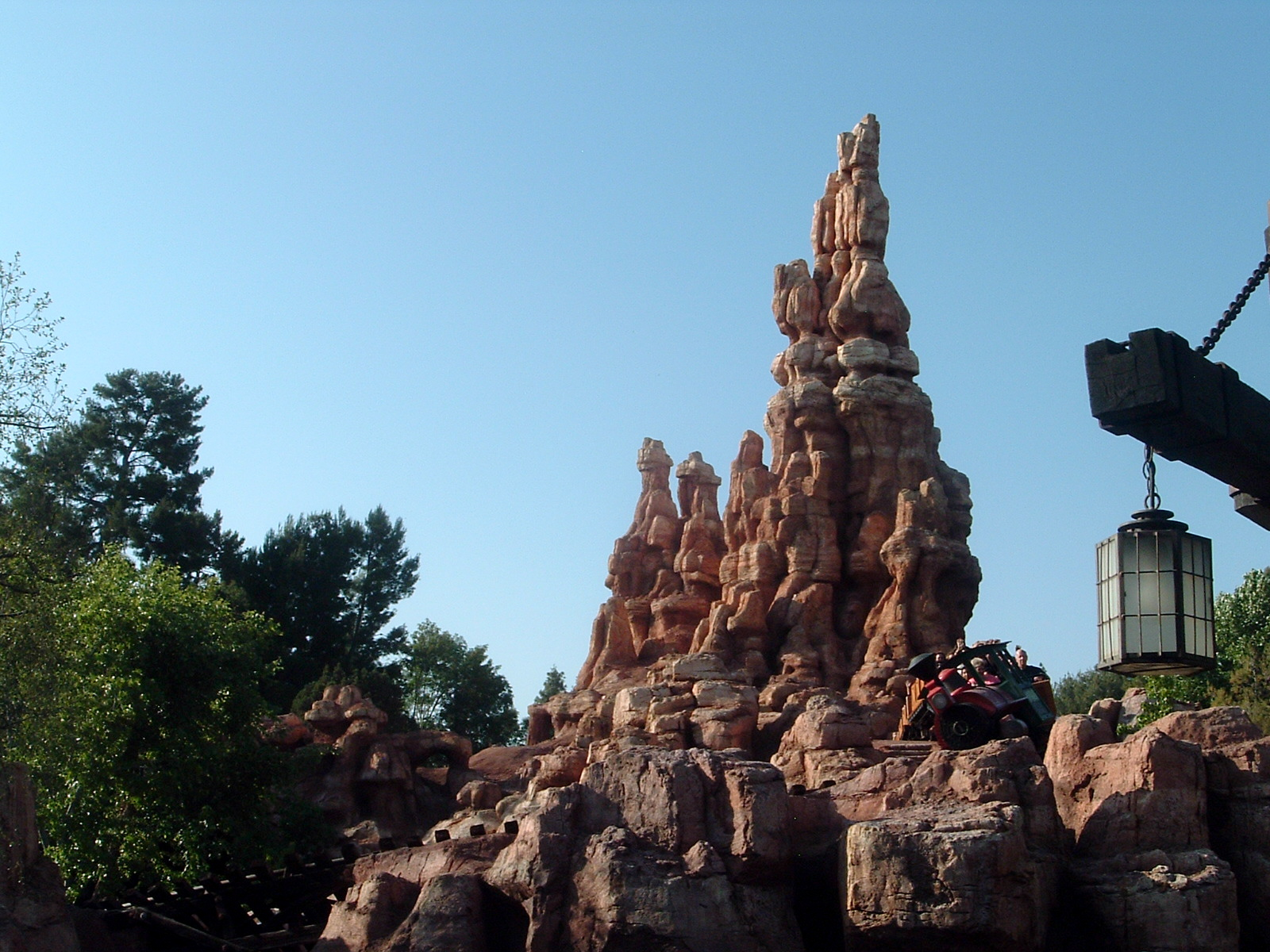
Big Thunder Mountain Railroad at Disneyland

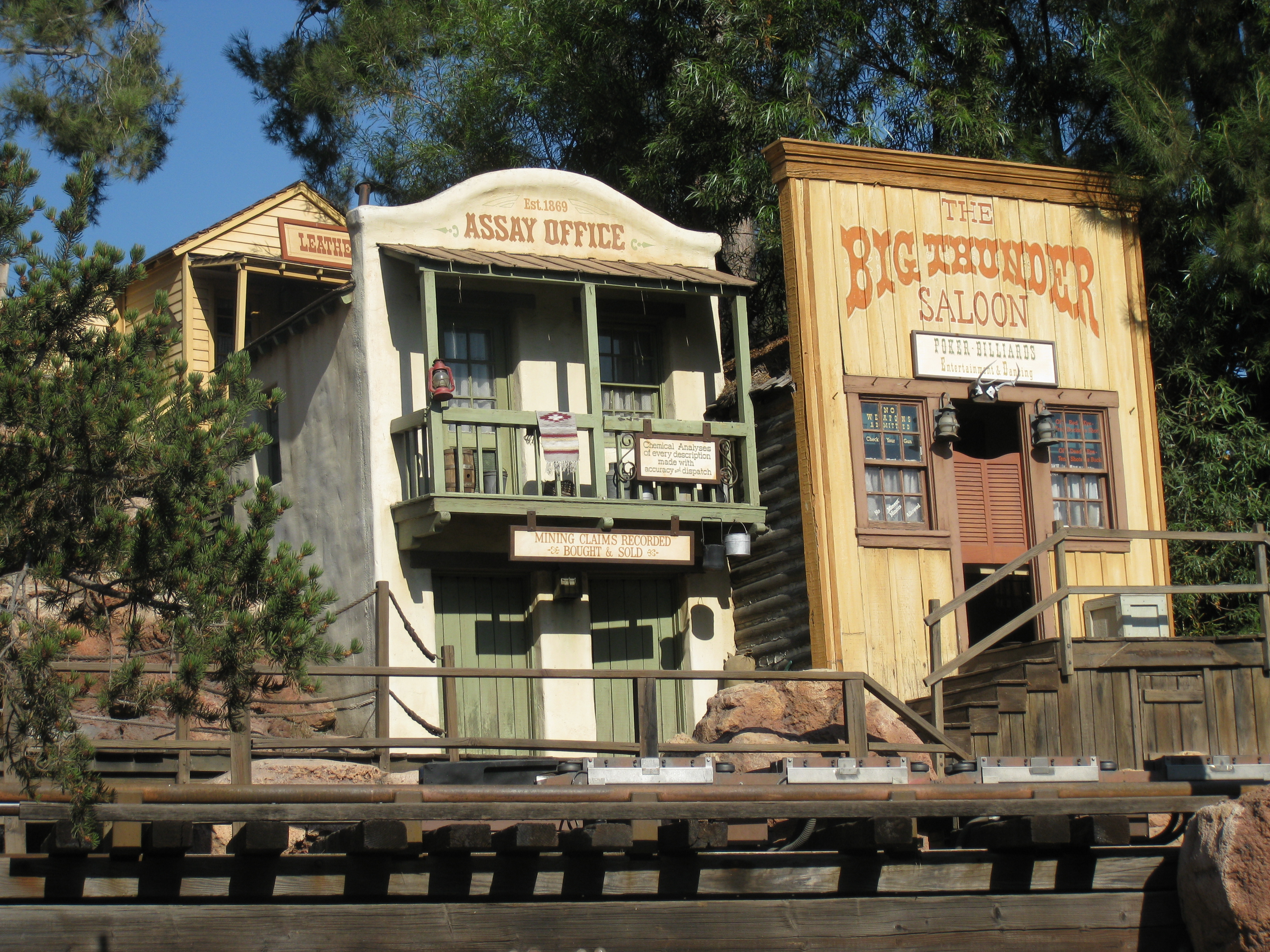
Rainbow Ridge used as the loading area and a tribute to Rainbow Caverns exists within the attraction Mine Train Through Nature's Wonderland

While the design of the Walt Disney World version of the ride was done first, Disneyland's version was the first one to open. The track layout was mirrored, placing the attraction to the right of the Rivers of America, if viewed from the central hub. (In Magic Kingdom, the attraction was located to the left of the Rivers of America, which closed at that park in 2025.) To better fit with the adjacent Fantasyland areas of the theme park, the original Walt Disney World design had to be replaced with something more appropriate for Disneyland. The Florida, Tokyo and Paris versions of the ride use sharp-edged mountains and the vibrant colors of Monument Valley, Arizona, while Disneyland's version was developed with more rounded features and muted colors resembling the Bryce Canyon hoodoos in Utah.

Upon entering the attraction, the queue winds through a narrow rock wall and passing by the tracks. The surrounding walls were originally created from 100 tons of gold ore from Rosamond.

Riders board the trains at an outdoor station located near Rainbow Ridge. This is the only version of the ride to feature an outdoor station, as the other versions feature an indoor station instead. Leaving the station, trains enter a bat-infested tunnel, make a right hand turn, then a left hand turn before climbing the first lift hill, which takes trains through a cavern full of stalactites. Leaving the lift hill, the train drops away to the right, then levels out and makes a left hand turn. The track then crosses under the second lift hill drop before making a right hand turn. The sounds of coyotes can be heard howling at the train as it dives into a cave. The train then rises uphill and hits a trim brake, makes a right turn out of the tunnel, and climbs the second lift hill. At the top of the lift, an animatronic goat with a stick of dynamite in its mouth bleats at passing guests as the train drops away to the right, crosses under the lift hill, and rises up into a downward spiraling clockwise helix. Leaving the helix, the train shoots through a small canyon, then drops down into a mining camp, where it hits another trim brake. The train then makes a left hand turn, enters another tunnel, and climbs the third lift hill. As the train climbs the lift, the tunnel is dynamited, and artificial smoke is blasted in guests' faces as the train crests the lift and exits the tunnel. The train then drops to the right, towards the river, then makes a right hand turn and passes through a short tunnel. After crossing over the drop, the trains make a left hand turn as they pass through the ribcage of a T-rex skeleton, hit a trim brake, then make a right hand turn into the final brakes. The train then travels past the buildings of Rainbow Ridge and returns to the station.

On January 7, 2013, the ride was closed for an extensive refurbishment that included a new track, trains, scenery, and new effects on the third lift hill. The attraction reopened on March 17, 2014. The new track was fabricated by Dynamic Structures, the company that had previously rehauled the coaster track in Space Mountain.

=== Magic Kingdom ===
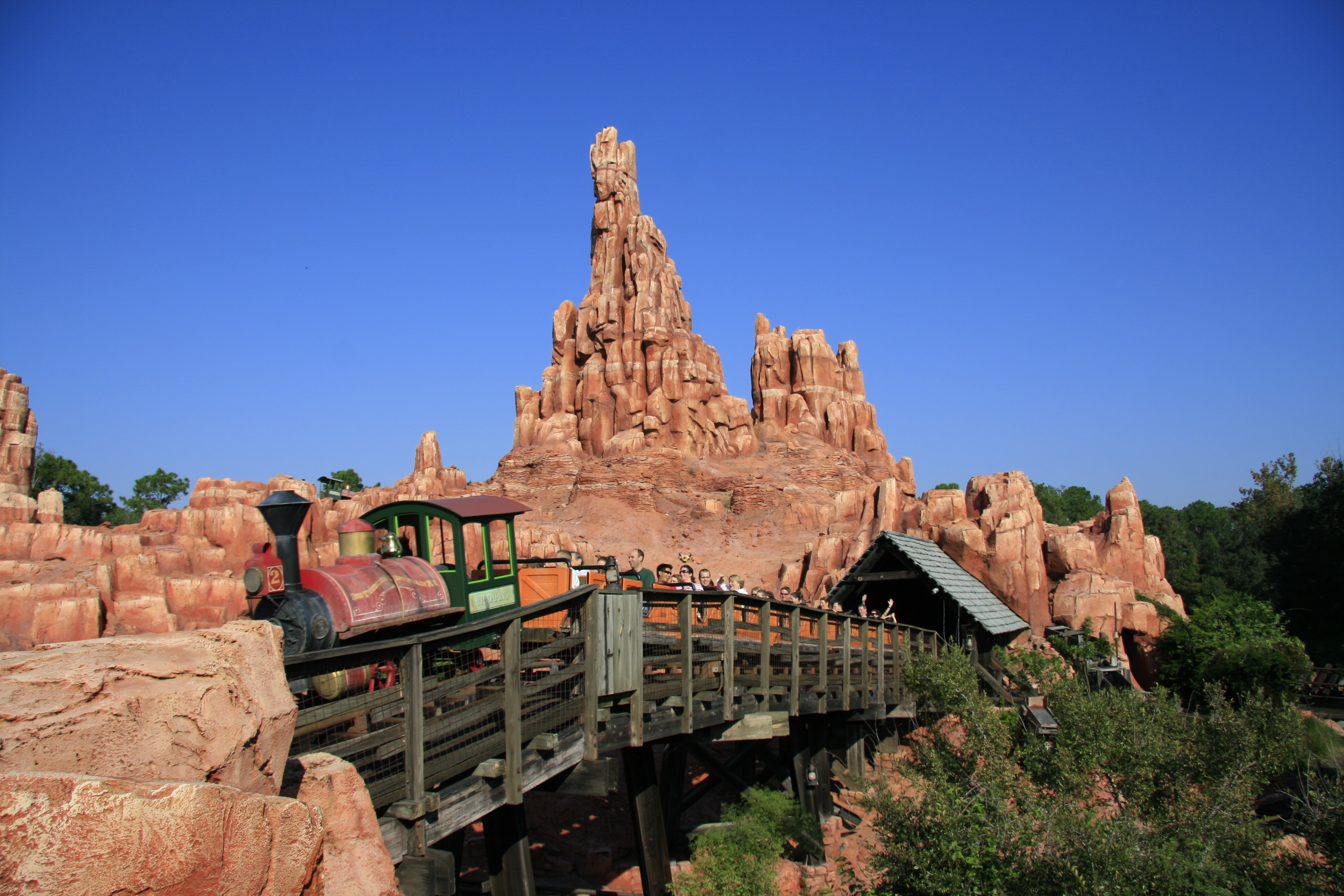
Big Thunder Mountain Railroad at Magic Kingdom

The track layout of the Magic Kingdom's version is nearly an identical mirrored layout of the Disneyland attraction.

Riders board the trains in an enclosed loading station on a hillside. Leaving the station, trains make a left hand turn into a bat-infested tunnel, make a slight right turn, and climb the first lift hill through a cavern lit up by several rainbow colored pools of water. As the train crests the lift hill, the water in the pools turn a bright red, accompanied by a low rumble. Upon leaving the lift hill, trains pass under a waterfall and drop to the left. This is followed by a right hand turn, after which the track crosses under the second lift hill and drop. After crossing under the second lift hill drop, the track goes through a 270 degree clockwise spiral and passes through a short tunnel. Trains emerge from the tunnel and pass through the flooded town of Tumbleweed, running parallel to the Walt Disney World Railroad. The train passes over a decaying trestle (where the track is slightly banked from side to side), before entering Davy Jones Mine, where it hits a trim brake. Trains then make a left hand turn and climb the second lift hill.

At the top of the second lift hill, trains drop to the left and cross under the lift hill, before rising into a 540 degree downhill counterclockwise helix, passing over a broken trestle. Leaving the helix, trains shoot up across a small hill, make a slight right turn, then drop through another tunnel and hit a trim brake. The trains then make a right hand turn into a tunnel and climb the third lift hill. As the train climbs the lift, it passes by several veins of gold that illuminate the tunnel; the mother lode of gold can be seen at the top of the lift hill. Leaving the lift, trains emerge from the tunnel, crest a small rise, and drop to the left towards the future location of Piston Peak. After traveling along a short section of straight track, the ride then makes a left hand turn through a short tunnel and crosses a short bridge. The train then makes a right hand turn, and passes through the ribcage of a T-Rex skeleton as it hits the final trim brake, makes a left hand turn past some geysers and hot springs, and rises into the final brakes. The train then makes a left turn back into the station.

The Florida version was allocated more space in the park, and so the Monument Valley-inspired ride structure assumes 2.5 acres, 25 percent larger than the Disneyland version. Due to the ride being surrounded by the former Rivers of America on the east and the Walt Disney World Railroad on the west, the maintenance facility for the trains is on the opposite side of the Railroad's track from the ride, with a swing bridge being used where the transfer track crosses the Railroad, just past the Frontierland station.

In January 2025, the Magic Kingdom version of the ride was temporarily closed for a complete refurbishment and installation of new track, with the ride reopening on May 3, 2026, since the ride has been updated for three times –in 1980, 2012 and 2016. The opening scene was updated and the ride includes a refreshed Rainbow Caverns, new audio-animatronics and gold props. Additionally, the height limit for the ride was lowered from 40 in (1.02 m) to 38 in (0.97 m) and the original maintenance shed was removed to accommodate Miss Fritter's Daredevil Spin-Along, Cars Ridge Run Rally and Villains Land.

=== Tokyo Disneyland ===
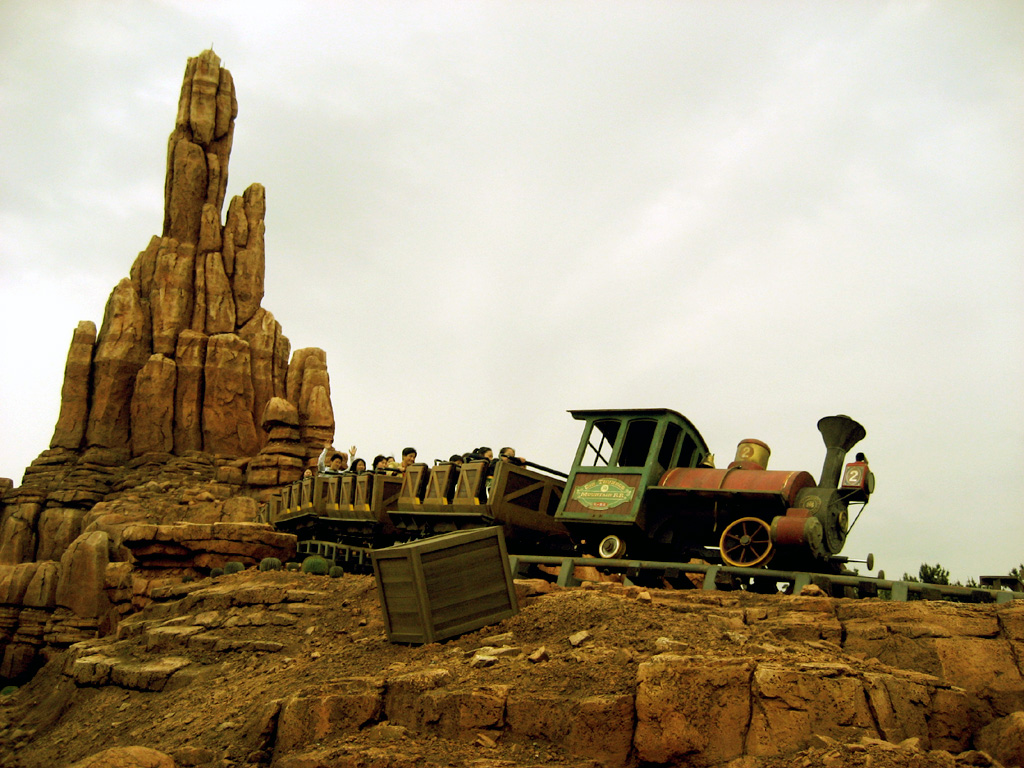
Big Thunder Mountain at Tokyo Disneyland

Big Thunder Mountain at Tokyo Disneyland is similar to the Magic Kingdom version, but there are some differences in the ride layout. Instead of Tumbleweed, the track makes a left turn and dives into a cave, nearly mirroring the California version of the ride. More significantly, the final segment of the ride is different. Instead of crossing back over the drop from the third lift hill, the track makes a 180 degree turn to the right before dropping out of a tunnel, through the Boneyard/geyser scene, into a short tunnel. The track then makes a right hand turn into the final brakes. The trains pass in front of the station building, and then turn back into the loading area.

=== Disneyland Paris ===
Big Thunder Mountain at Disneyland Paris

Disneyland Paris's version of the ride features a washed out trestle right before the second lift hill.

The Paris version of the ride is unique as it is situated on an island in the middle of the Rivers of the Far West, where Tom Sawyer's Island would normally sit. It is also the only version of the ride to be an opening day attraction and the largest installment at any Disney park. Its ride experience is similar to the Magic Kingdom version.

Guests board the trains at a station on the mainland. Unlike the other versions, the trains at the Paris version are painted to look weathered and aged. Immediately upon leaving the station, trains dive into a tunnel that transports them under the Rivers of the Far West to the island where the ride is located. The train makes a right hand turn, and makes a quick steep rise before starting up the first lift hill. As trains climb out of the darkness of the underwater tunnel, stalactites and stalagmites can be seen growing next to the track, along with several rainbow colored pools of water. The sounds of bats swooping up above can also be heard. During warmer months, a waterfall parts around the track at the top of the hill. Trains pop out of the tunnel, leave the lift hill, and drop around a left hand turn, pass through a small cave, then make a swooping right turn. If the trains are being dispatched timely, when the train goes through this curve, it will appear to make a near miss with a train in the 540 degree helix.

After this turn, the trains pass under the second lift hill and its drop, making a slight hop, before making a left hand turn onto a trestle. The trains run along the Rivers of the Far West, across the water from Phantom Manor (Disneyland Paris' version of The Haunted Mansion), then make a slight right hand turn and suddenly fall through a washed out section of the trestle. The trestle drop also contains an on-ride camera. After dropping down to the water level (with water jets on the sides of the track simulating a splashdown), the trains go around a left turn, enter a mill camp, and begin climbing the second lift hill.

As trains start up the lift hill, two tied down donkeys can be seen to the right side of the track, braying at passing trains, with an empty watering pail in front of them. A goat can be seen pulling on a shirt hanging on a clothesline to the riders' left, as the trains pass a parked steamroller and mine elevator, and travel under a water tower. At the top of the lift, the trains drop to the left and cross back under the lift hill. Coming out of the drop, the trains go over another rise, hitting a magnetic trim brake, and enter a 540 degree counterclockwise helix, passing over a broken trestle. Exiting the helix, the trains pass through a short cave and go over a quick airtime hill as they shoot down a canyon. As the trains drop through the tunnel and pass over a trim brake, a loud gust of wind is heard. Trains then make a right hand turn on another trestle, enter a tunnel with signs warning of blasting over the portal, and climb the third lift hill.

As the train starts up the third hill, the tunnel is dynamited, and artificial smoke is blasted in guests' faces as the train crests the lift and exits the tunnel. The train crests a small hill, then drops to the left onto a straightaway alongside the river, speeding up as it enters the return tunnel. The train encounters a swarm of bats in the tunnel as it makes another sharp counter-clockwise turnaround and goes down a steep drop to cross under the water. The trains continue to accelerate through the dark until it pops out of the exit portal on the mainland. An additional chain lift is located here to assist the train in leaving the tunnel. The train then coasts past the station, through the loading dock, and then makes a left turn to reenter the station.

The Paris version underwent a year long refurbishment from November 2015 to December 2016. As part of the renovation, the brakes were overhauled, some of the scenery was repainted, and a few elements from the California version were added (rainbow pools of water on the first lift hill cave, new sound effects for the mine elevator on the second lift hill, new mapping effects for the blasting scene on the third lift hill). Interactive games were also installed in the queue.

== In other media ==
=== In film ===
The sounds of Disneyland's Big Thunder Mountain Railroad trains were recorded and used as sound effects for the mine cart chase sequence in Steven Spielberg and George Lucas' 1984 film, Indiana Jones and the Temple of Doom. Disneyland would later get its own Indiana Jones attraction in 1995, and the Walt Disney Company would go on to acquire the Indiana Jones franchise with its purchase of Lucasfilm in 2012.

In 2022, Disney Television Animation short series Chibi Tiny Tales featured a crossover short with The Proud Family: Louder and Prouder characters visiting the ride.

In August 2022, it was announced that a film adaptation of the ride was in development. Amber Templemore-Finlayson and Katie Ellwood, collectively known as "Bert & Bertie", will serve as co-directors after the pair impressed studio executives with their pitched approach to the property. The script is being co-written by Michele and Kieran Mulroney. The project will be a joint-venture production between LuckyChap Entertainment, and Scott Free Productions.

=== In television ===
In January 2013, ABC ordered a pilot based on the ride titled Big Thunder Mountain, but the idea was scrapped sometime after.

In the Modern Family episode "Disneyland", Phil (Ty Burrell) and his son Luke (Nolan Gould) ride Big Thunder Mountain Railroad together during a family trip to Disneyland in Anaheim. Phil, who self-proclaims to be king of the roller coasters, begins to feel even more queasy when riding Big Thunder, after he and Luke had exited Indiana Jones Adventure prior.

=== Print media ===
In October 2014, Marvel Comics announced a five-issue series based on the attraction, which eventually debuted in early 2015. Part of Marvel's "Disney Kingdoms" line, the series elaborated on the story behind the attraction and featured input from Walt Disney Imagineering, including numerous nods to elements of the ride. The story would focus around Abigail Bullion, the spirited daughter of Big Thunder Mining Company founder Barnabas T. Bullion. She falls in with a group of bandits seeking to undermine the authority of Barnabas and his corrupt foreman Willikers and put stolen wealth from the mountain to good use helping the townspeople of Rainbow Ridge.

== Incidents ==
- March 10, 1998, Disneyland: A 5-year-old boy was seriously injured when his foot became wedged between the passenger car's running board and the edge of the exterior platform after the train temporarily paused before pulling into the unloading area. All of the toes on his left foot required amputation. This led to improvements to the ride, although the family maintains the park would not acknowledge this injury as the reason.
- September 5, 2003, Disneyland: A 22-year-old man died after suffering severe blunt trauma to the chest and extensive internal bleeding in a derailment that also injured 10 other riders. The cause of the accident was determined to be improper maintenance. Investigation reports and discovery by the victim's attorney confirmed the fatal injuries occurred when the first passenger car collided with the underside of the locomotive. The derailment was the result of a mechanical failure which occurred due to omissions during a maintenance procedure. Fasteners on the left side upstop/guide wheel on the floating axle of the locomotive were not tightened and safetied in accordance with specifications. As the train entered a tunnel, the axle came loose and jammed against a brake section, causing the locomotive to become airborne and hit the ceiling of the tunnel. The locomotive then fell on top of the first passenger car, crushing the victim. After the investigation to this incident was complete, the ride was reopened on March 11, 2004.
- April 25, 2011, Disneyland Park Paris: Five guests were injured when a piece of scenery fell onto a passing train. One guest, a 38-year-old man, was seriously injured and transported to a Paris hospital, while the other four were treated at the scene.
- October 27, 2011, Disneyland Paris: Two cars derailed as one of the ride's trains passed slowly over a flat section of track. Two guests were slightly injured, and the ride was subsequently closed for inspections.
- February 2017, Magic Kingdom: a 54-year-old man died after riding the attraction. The cause of his death is believed to be from natural causes due to a pre-existing medical condition. A Disney spokesperson said the ride was operating as normal.

== See also ==
- List of Disneyland attractions
- List of Magic Kingdom attractions
- List of Tokyo Disneyland attractions
- List of Disneyland Park (Paris) attractions
