= Expedition Everest =

Steel roller coaster built by Vekoma

Expedition Everest – Legend of the Forbidden Mountain

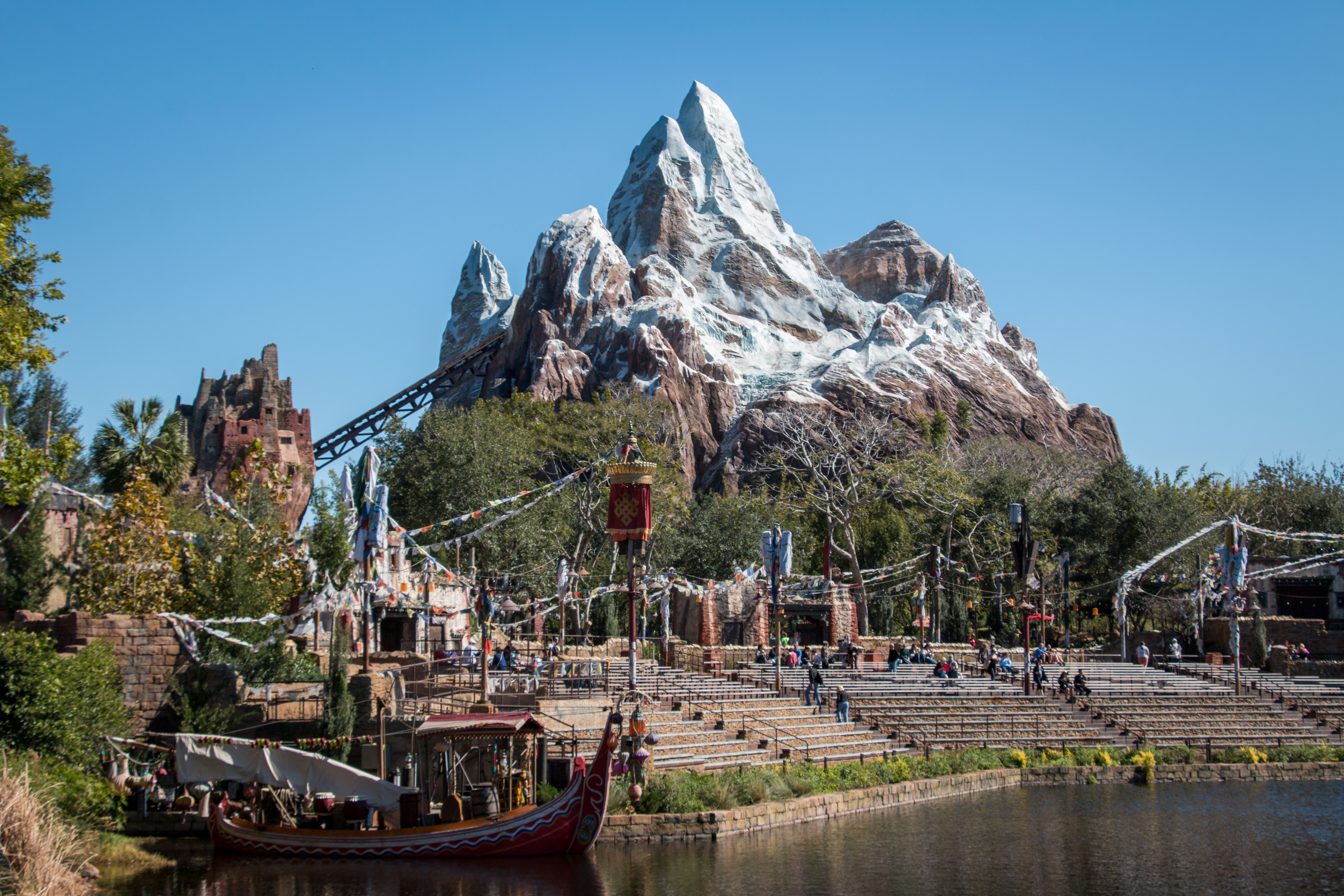
- Expedition Everest

Disney's Animal Kingdom
- Location: Disney's Animal Kingdom
- Park section: Asia
- Coordinates: 28.3582°N 81.5863°W
- Status: Operating
- Soft opening date: January 26, 2006
- Opening date: April 7, 2006
- Cost: US $100,000,000

General statistics
- Manufacturer: Vekoma
- Designer: Walt Disney Imagineering
- Model: Custom
- Track layout: Custom
- Lift/launch system: Chain lift hill
- Height: 118 ft (36 m)
- Drop: 80 ft (24 m)
- Length: 4,112 ft (1,253 m)
- Speed: 50 mph (80 km/h)
- Inversions: 0
- Duration: 2:50
- Capacity: 2,050 riders per hour
- G-force: 3.0
- Height restriction: 44 in (112 cm)
- Trains: 6 (max. 5 in operation) trains with 6 cars. Riders are arranged 2 across in 3 rows with the exception of the last car which has only 2 rows for a total of 34 riders per train.
- Restraints: Individual Lap-bars
- Audio-animatronics: Yes (Non-functional)
- Lightning Lane available
- Must transfer from wheelchair
- Expedition Everest – Legend of the Forbidden Mountain at RCDB

Expedition Everest – Legend of the Forbidden Mountain, also known as Expedition Everest, is a steel roller coaster built by Vekoma at Disney's Animal Kingdom at the Walt Disney World Resort in Bay Lake, Florida. The ride is themed around the Yeti protecting the Forbidden Mountain next to Mount Everest. It is the only roller coaster at Disney's Animal Kingdom, and the tallest roller coaster at any Disney theme park.

The 2011 edition of Guinness World Records lists Expedition Everest as the most expensive roller coaster in the world, a record the ride held until 2019 when Hagrid's Magical Creatures Motorbike Adventure at Universal Islands of Adventure opened. Including sets and extras, its total cost was reported to be US$100 million for six years of planning and construction. It is the tallest artificial mountain in all of the Walt Disney parks, and Disney's 18th mountain-themed attraction. It is also the most recently opened attraction at Walt Disney World not based on a pre-existing intellectual property.

== History ==
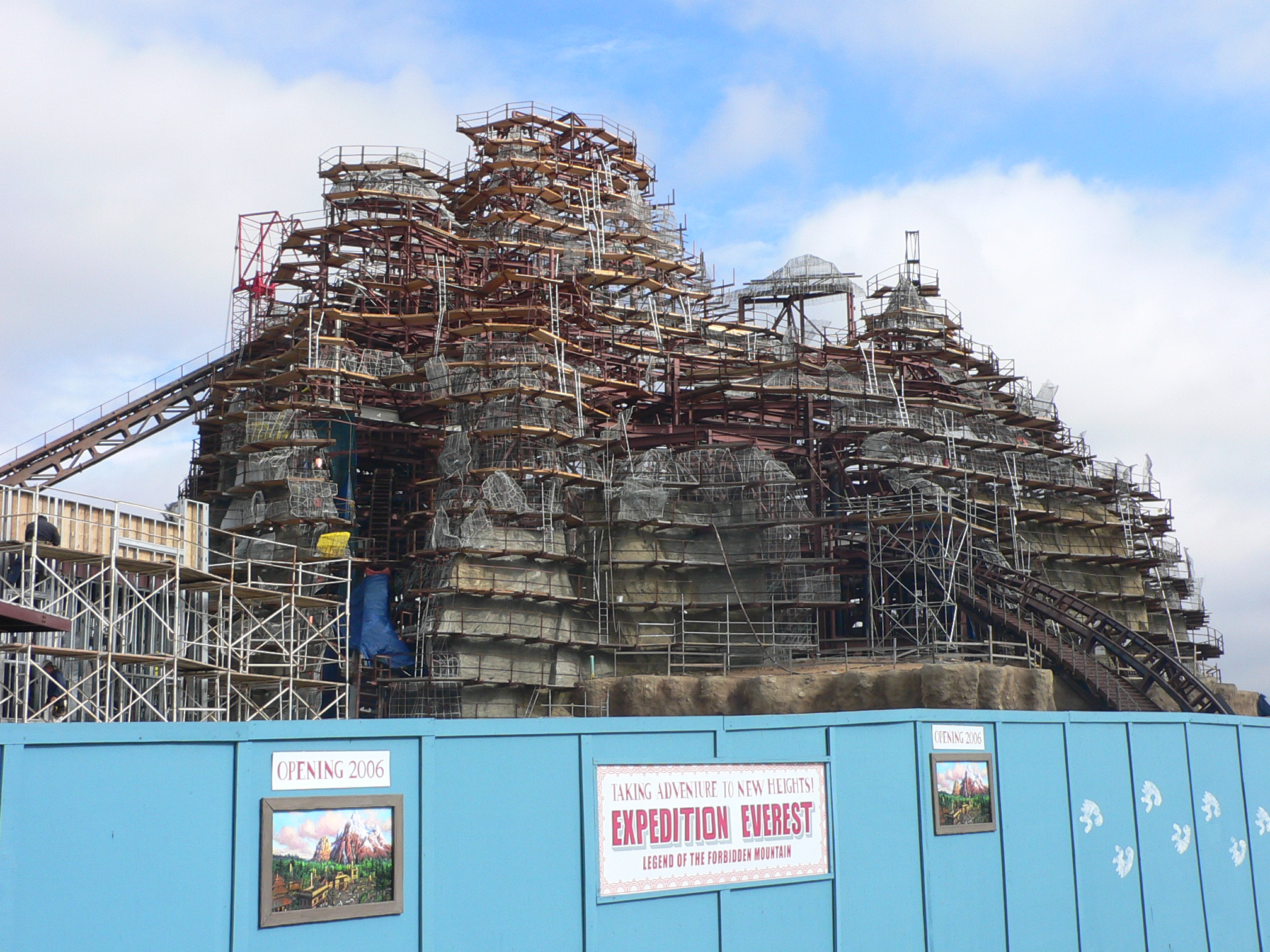
Expedition Everest under construction in 2005

The attraction was announced publicly on April 22, 2003, during an event to celebrate the fifth anniversary of Disney's Animal Kingdom. Construction of the new attraction began a month before the announcement in March 2003. It took three years and required more than 38 miles (61 km) of rebar; 5,000 tons of structural steel; and 10,000 tons of concrete. Expedition Everest opened for previews on January 26, 2006, and had its grand opening on April 7, 2006, in ceremonies led by Disney CEO Bob Iger and theme parks chairman Jay Rasulo. At 199.5 feet (60.8 m), it is the tallest attraction at Walt Disney World, beating The Twilight Zone Tower of Terror at Disney's Hollywood Studios by 6 inches (15 cm). Disney keeps all of its attraction buildings under 200 feet (61 m) because aviation laws require structures of that height and taller to have a blinking red light beacon for low-flying aircraft, which would take away from the theming of their attraction.

== Ride experience ==
=== Queue ===
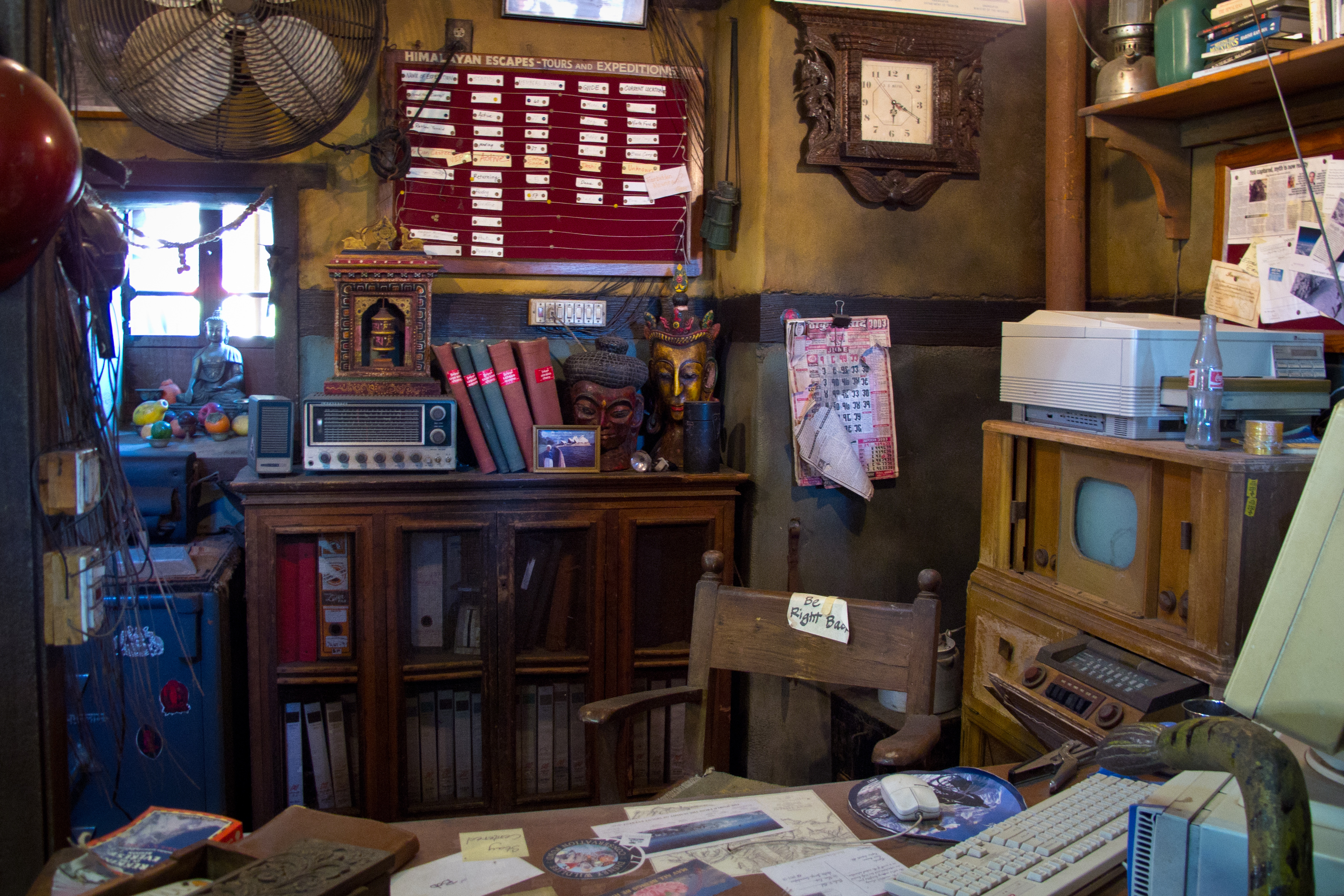
Office in queue

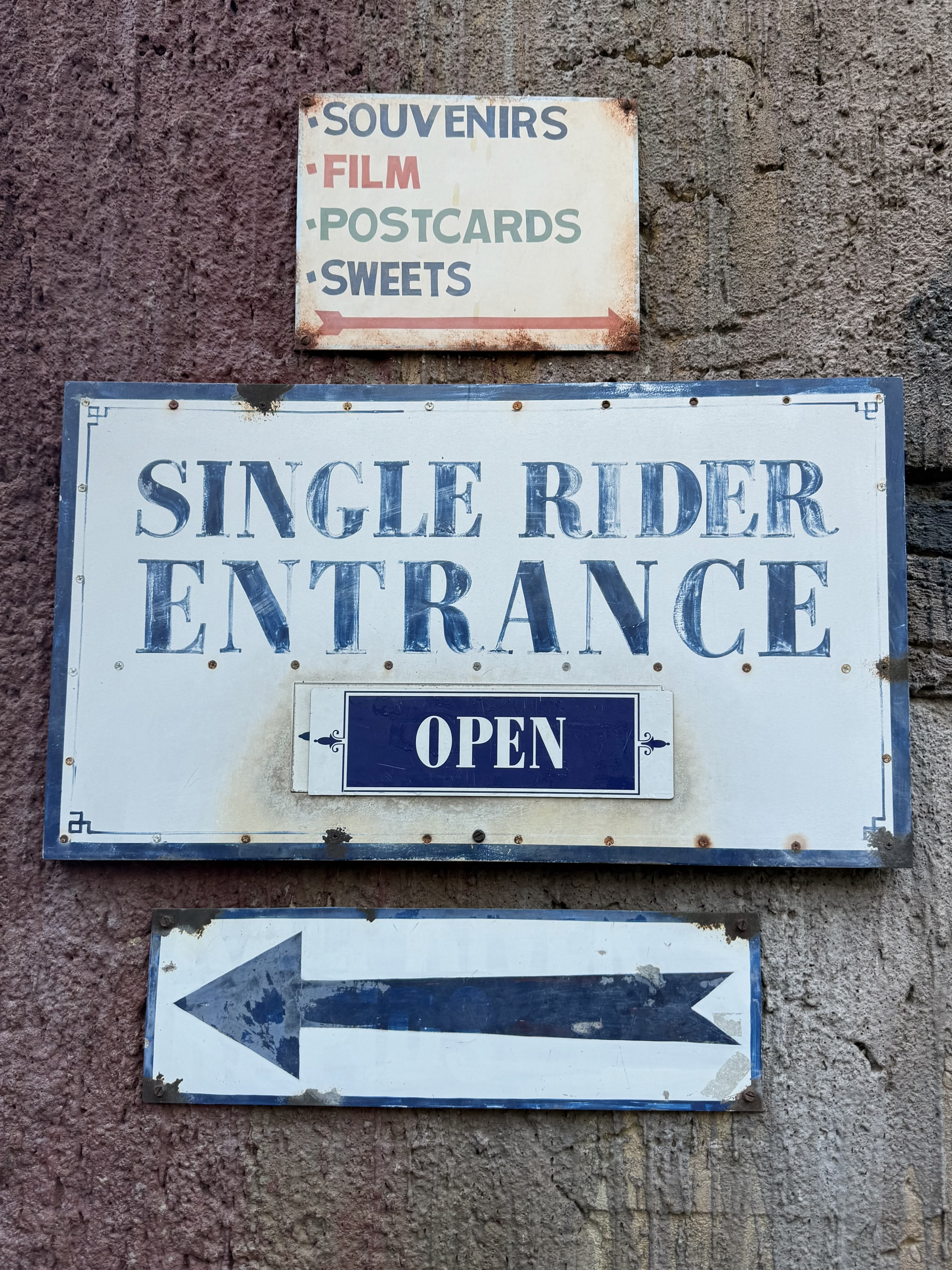
Expedition Everest was the only ride at Animal Kingdom to utilize a single rider line.

The attraction features a stand-by and Lightning Lane line. Expedition Everest also had a Single rider that ceased operation on September 21, 2026. The queue starts at the office of the fictional "Himalayan Escapes" travel agency, progressing to a replica temple with little holy figures. Visitors next enter a tea garden, followed by a room with equipment from a successful expedition, and then the "Yeti Museum", which contains information on the Yeti and a moulding of a Yeti footprint. There are also about 8,000 artifacts brought from the Nepal trip in the museum. The single-rider line skips all of the exhibits.

=== Ride ===
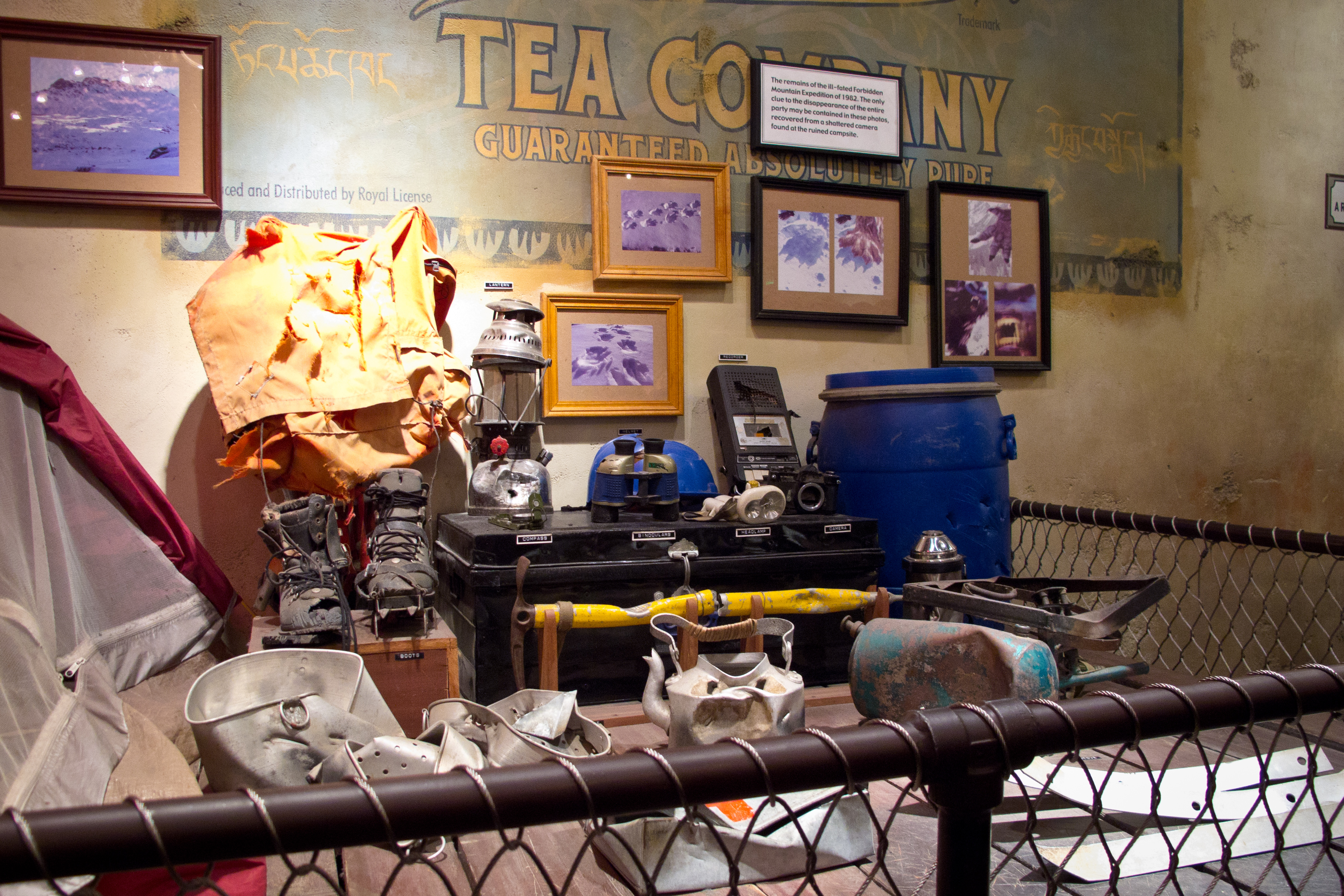
Artifacts from the "lost expedition"

Riders board the roller coaster in the model village of Serka Zong, to begin a speedy route through the Himalayas to the base of Mount Everest.

The train blows its whistle and departs the station to the right and climbs a small lift leading to a short drop, then circles around to the 118-foot (36 m) lift hill, carrying the riders into the mountain. On the way up, it passes through a ransacked temple with murals of the yeti, warning the riders that the mountain is its territory. A noise can also be heard during this lift hill, foreshadowing the yeti. At the top of the mountain, the train curves around the main peak and goes through a cave. When it emerges from the other side, the train quickly stops at the top of a hill blocked off by a shredded track. Large footprints are seen in the snow followed by a loud roar, presuming the Yeti tore up the track. To the left of the broken tracks is a secret bird animatronic, a bearded vulture, sitting on a stick. The train itself is held in place by a series of rubber tires while an automatic switch rotates the piece of track directly behind the train. The train then rolls backwards along a new route that spirals down through the mountain by track switches. It eventually comes to a stop in a large cave, where riders see the yeti's shadow on the wall as it tears up more track. This effect distracts riders from noticing another automatic track switch in front of them. As the shadow moves away, the train rolls forward out of the mountain, going past the on-ride camera and plunging down the main 80-foot (24 m) drop. It enters a 250° turn and speeds back up through another cave in the mountain, where the roars of the yeti are heard once more. The train exits from the rear of the mountain and enters a large helix before being lifted back into the mountain a final time. The train drops through a cave, where an audio animatronic of the yeti is reaching down toward it. On reaching the bottom of this drop, riders return to the unloading dock and depart into a gift shop. The ride lasts 2 minutes and 50 seconds.

=== Trains ===
Expedition Everest has six steam-like trains, each with six cars. Each train has 17 rows seating two abreast, for a total of 34 riders per train. The trains are themed as the "Anandapur Rail Service" and are made to look old and rusty. Riders must be at least 44 inches (110 cm) tall and are secured by a lap bar. The "locomotive" itself is designed to resemble a vertical boiler configuration and is placed at the rear of the train rather than the front, so not to obstruct the riders' view. Up to five trains usually operate at once, but fewer can be used if guest demand is low. To create the illusion of a "steam powered" train, engineers placed vents under the station. When a train comes into the station, steam comes up through the vents and enters the loading platform.

=== Track ===
The steel track is 4,112 feet (1,253 m) long and the lift is about 118 feet (36 m) high. Expedition Everest uses a track system by Dutch manufacturer Vekoma, where the rails are mounted on the outer surface of the ties, rather than on the inner surface. This was the first large-scale installation of such a system.

== Design ==
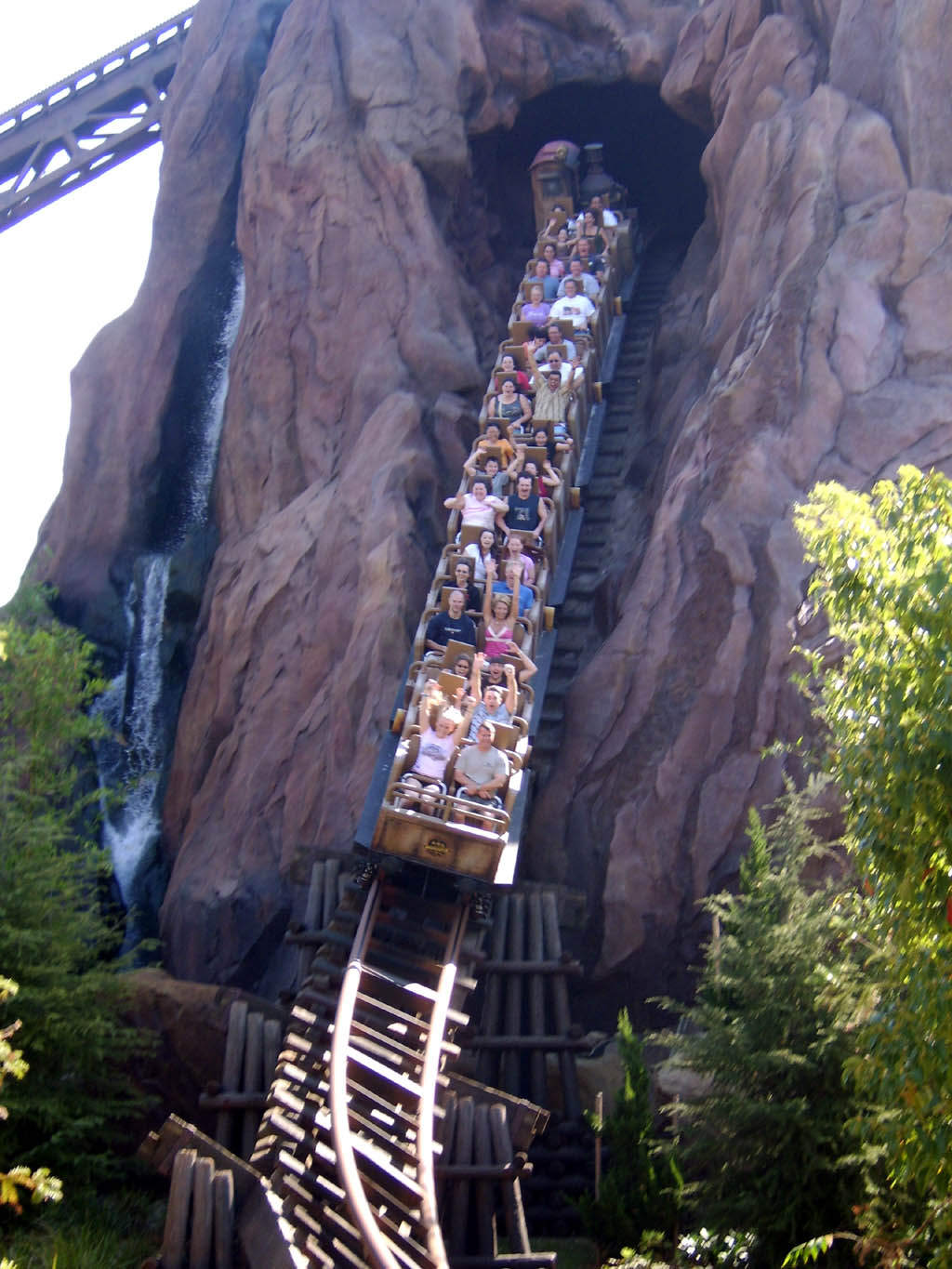
A close up of one of the trains on the main drop

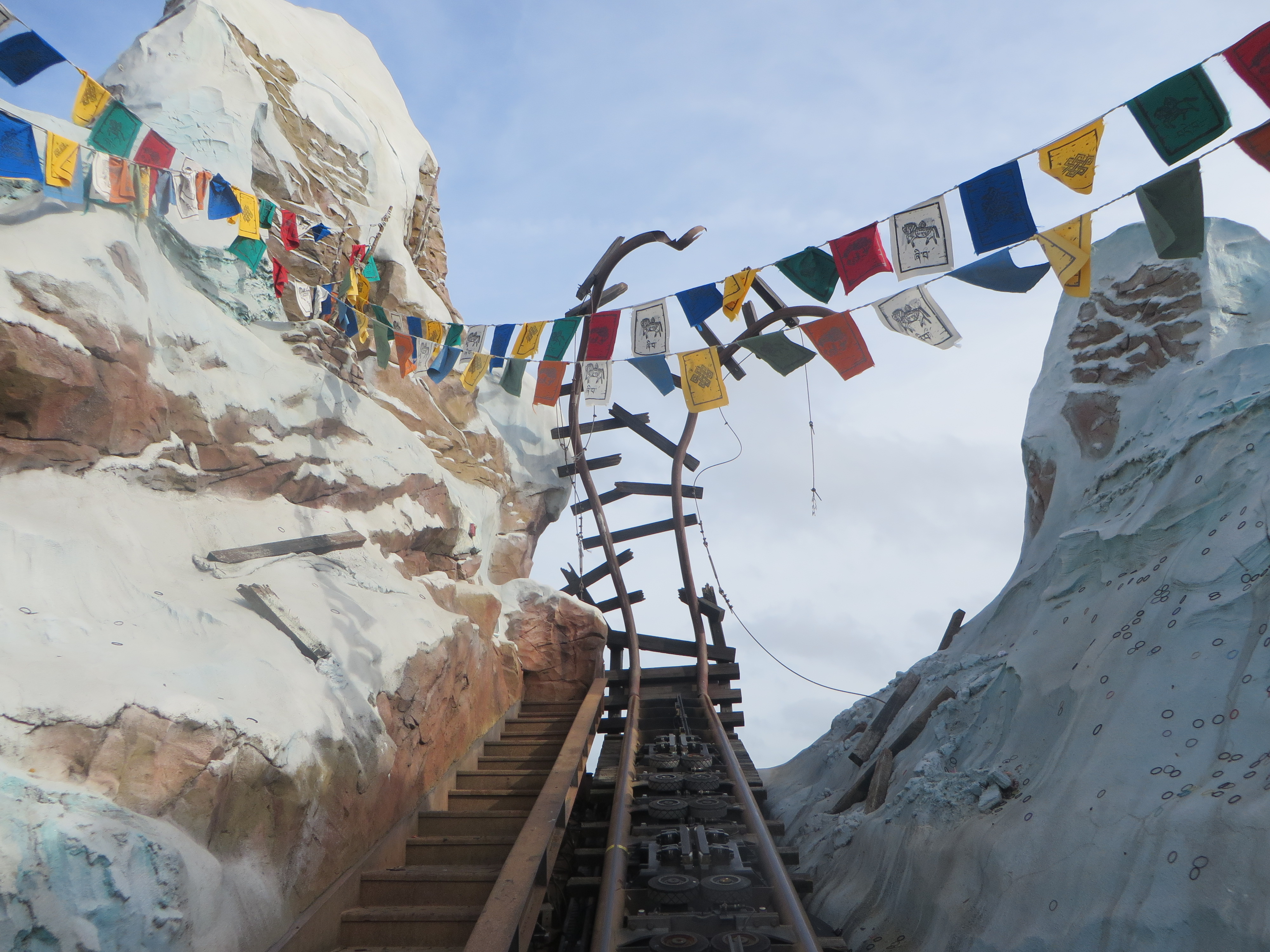
The shredded track at the top of the ride

Although moderate in height and length by contemporary standards, Expedition Everest was the first ride for Disney to have its trains travel both forward and backward. This is accomplished through two sets of track switches, one before the rear segment and one after. This was the second Disney roller coaster to run backwards, the first being Indiana Jones et le Temple du Péril: Backwards! at Disneyland Resort Paris (2000–2004). Expedition Everest, however, was the first Disney roller coaster to switch between forward and backward sections during the same ride.

The mountain façade, the Yeti audio-animatronic, and the roller coaster are three independent structures. Each structure reaches the ground-level and does not touch the other two structures. This was achieved via a 4-D scheduling software that provided the exact details on how to construct it.

=== The Mountain ===
Expedition Everest is often compared to the 1959 Matterhorn Bobsleds roller coaster at Disneyland, which also features a snowy mountain setting and an "abominable snowman" figure throughout the ride. Expedition Everest's mountain is made from 1,800 tons of steel and painted with 2,000 gallons of paint. At 199.5 feet (60.8 meters), to avoid the Floridian legal requirement to place a light atop structures 200 feet or taller to alert planes, it is the tallest artificial mountain in the world, but not, as occasionally cited, the tallest point in Florida. It was the 18th mountain-themed attraction built on Disney property.

The artificial mountain is not a model of Mount Everest, but rather of the fictional "forbidden mountain" guarded by the yeti in the story created for the attraction by Walt Disney Imagineering. Everest is represented by the barren background peak on the far right, which is made to seem far in the distance (an example of forced perspective). Moreover, there is a small shrine on the ground level in the Asia area of the park which has been designed to perfectly overlap with the view of the distant attraction.

=== The Yeti ===
The Yeti was the largest and most complex audio-animatronic figure ever built by Walt Disney Imagineering at the time of its construction. It is 25 feet (7.6 m) tall. Its "skin" measures 1,000 square feet (93 m^{2}), and is held in place by 1,000 snaps and 250 zippers. Its movement is controlled by 19 actuators when functioning in "A-mode", its full mode of operation. In "A-mode," it can move 5 ft (1.5 m) horizontally and 18 in (46 cm) vertically.

A few months after the ride opened in 2006, the Yeti figure's framing split, threatening catastrophic malfunction if it were to be operated further in "A-mode". Since then, it has been operated only in the alternative "B-mode", in which a strobe-light effect is used to give the appearance of movement, earning it the nickname "Disco Yeti" from some fans. For years it was speculated that the problem was caused by damage to the Yeti's concrete base structure, which is unlikely to be repaired until a major refurbishment in the distant future, because the design limits access to the animatronic without major disassembly of the superstructure. The problem with the concrete is rumored to have occurred due to a glitch in the 4-D scheduling software that prevented adequate curing of a portion of the Yeti's foundation before the fabrication of mountain elements and roller coaster track. The prevailing theory is that the damage is to the animatronic itself, and not to the concrete base structure.

Joe Rohde, the Imagineer in charge of building the attraction and Animal Kingdom, was asked about the Yeti animatronic at the 2013 D23 Expo. Rohde responded,

You have to understand, it's a giant complicated machine sitting on top of, like, a 46-foot tall tower in the middle of a finished building. So, it's really hard to fix, but we are working on it. And we continue to work on it. We have tried several 'things', none of them quite get to the key-turning of the 40-foot tower inside of a finished building, but we are working on it.

During the D23 Fan Event in August 2026, it was announced that Disney will be "bringing the Yeti back to life" and new concept art was shown.

== Promotions ==
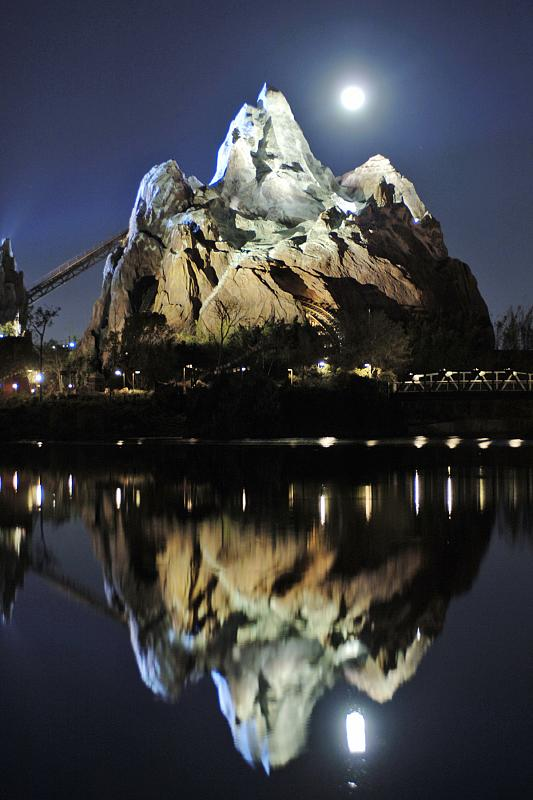
Expedition Everest at night

=== Discovery Networks ===
In 2005, Disney, Discovery Networks (now Warner Bros. Discovery), and Conservation International conducted expeditions to Nepal as part of the promotion for Expedition Everest. The purpose was to conduct scientific and cultural research in remote areas of the Himalayas, the location of the yeti legend. Participants included Joe Rohde from Walt Disney Imagineering and scientists from Conservation International and Disney's Animal Kingdom.

The expeditions and the making of the attraction were chronicled in three documentaries broadcast on Discovery's cable television channels in April 2006. The first was Expedition Everest: Journey to Sacred Lands, broadcast on the Travel Channel on April 9 to coincide with the attraction's grand opening. The second, Building A Thrill Ride: Expedition Everest, was aired on April 10 on the Science Channel and on April 12 on the Discovery Channel. It detailed the planning and construction of the ride, along with some of the ideas that made it possible. (During construction, for example, instead of traditional scaffolding the Imagineers used interior poles that poked through the outside of the mountain and were connected by wooden platforms.) This documentary also featured survival tips from Les Stroud. The third, Corwin's Quest: Realm of the Yeti, was broadcast on Animal Planet in April and featured American animal and nature conservationist Jeff Corwin.

=== Everest in the City ===
On February 15, 2006, Disney staged an elaborate publicity stunt called "Everest in the City" in New York City's Times Square. They draped large billboards over the sides of several buildings, depicting Everest with a coaster car careening down the mountainside and the yeti looking on from another peak, its eyes glowing red and flashing when the text message "Disney" was sent to "4Yeti" as provided by Disney.

== Incidents ==
- On December 18, 2007, a 44-year-old guest was found unconscious after the train returned to the station. He was taken to a hospital, where he was pronounced dead. A preliminary autopsy by the Orange County medical examiner's office concluded that the victim had died of dilated cardiomyopathy.
- On May 19, 2018, a 26-year-old man suffered a seizure after riding the attraction.
- On July 5, 2019, a 41-year-old woman suffered a seizure after riding the attraction.

== Awards and records ==
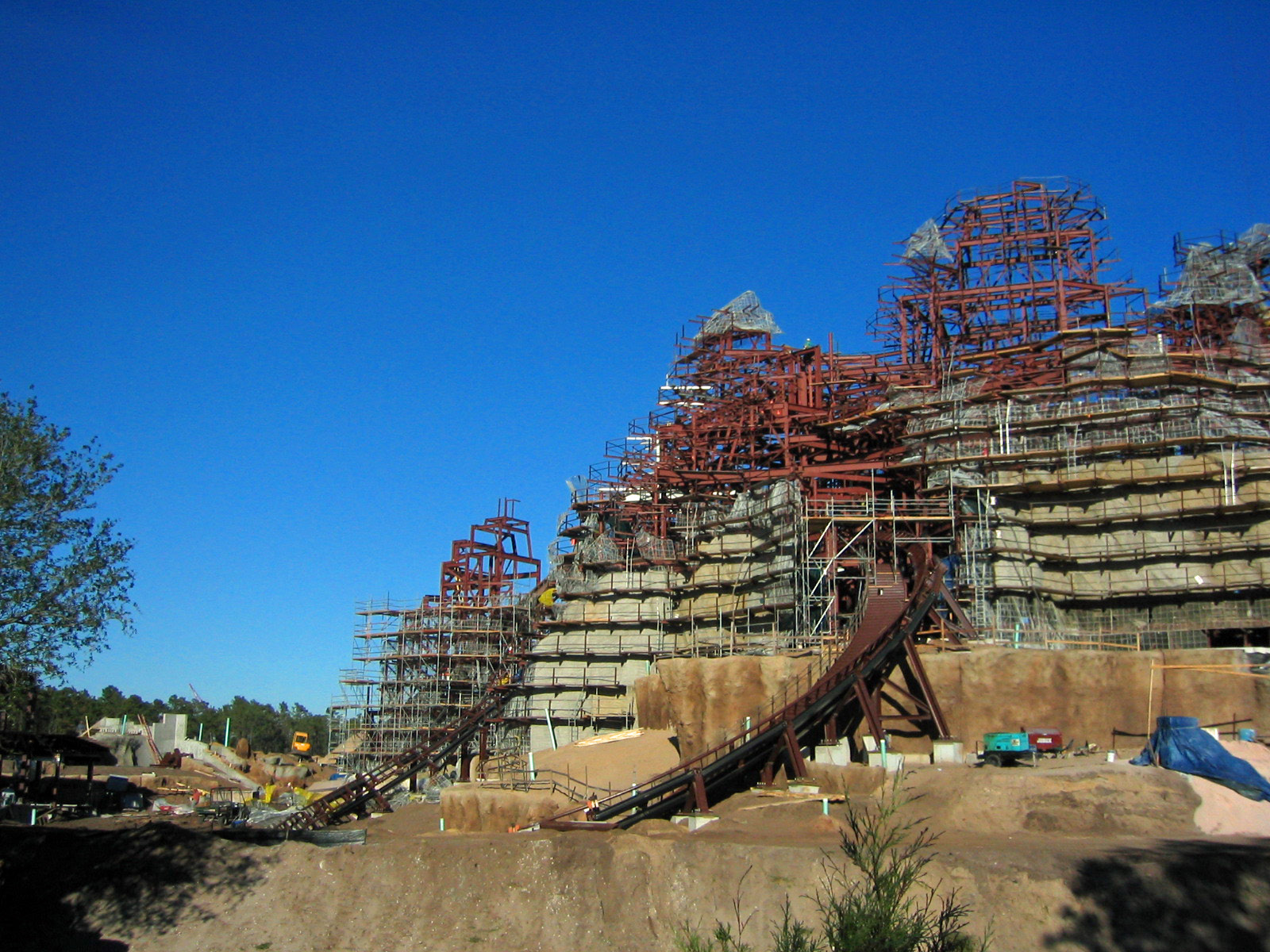
Expedition Everest under construction in 2004.

The 2011 book of Guinness World Records lists Expedition Everest as the most expensive roller coaster in the world. Including sets and extras, the total cost of the ride was reported to be US$100 million over six years of planning and construction. In 2019, this record was surpassed by Hagrid's Magical Creatures Motorbike Adventure at The Wizarding World of Harry Potter, which cost US$300 million.

Expedition Everest won the 2006 Theme Park Insider Award for the "World's Best New Theme Park Attraction". It has also been ranked in the Golden Ticket Awards and the Best Roller Coaster Poll. It was ranked second for "Best New Ride For 2006" in the Golden Ticket Awards.

Golden Ticket Awards: Top steel Roller Coasters
Year									1998	1999
Ranking									–	–
Year	2000	2001	2002	2003	2004	2005	2006	2007	2008	2009
Ranking	–	–	–	–	–	–	–	32 (tied)	35	36
Year	2010	2011	2012	2013	2014	2015	2016	2017	2018	2019
Ranking	36	47	–	42 (tied)	–	47	49 (tied)	49	46	–
Year	2020	2021	2022	2023	2024	2025	2026			
Ranking	N/A	–	–	–	–	–	–			

== See also ==
- Matterhorn Bobsleds
- Big Grizzly Mountain Runaway Mine Cars
