= Legends of the Wild West =

Attraction at Disneyland Paris

Coordinates: 48°52′19″N 2°46′35″E

Disneyland Park (Paris)
- Area: Frontierland
- Status: Operating
- Opening date: 1993

Ride statistics
- Attraction type: Walkthrough attraction
- Designer: Walt Disney Imagineering
- Theme: American Far-West

Legends of the Wild West is a walkthrough attraction located in Frontierland in Disneyland Paris. It opened in 1993, and features wax characters from the American Far-West, and even famous "Legends".

== Summary ==
The attraction takes place in a Civil War-inspired fort, known as Fort Comstock, located at the entrance of Thunder Mesa (the fictional city portrayed in Frontierland). Guests are led to the upper floor, where the following wax figures are visible:

- The Forty-Niner, who has just found golden nuggets during the Gold Rush.
- The Thug, snoring in prison, waiting for a jailbreak.
- The Sheriff in his office, full of Wanted posters. He is getting ready for his next shootout.
- Davy Crockett, here seen shooting another man.
- Buffalo Bill in his home, preparing his Wild West Show with two other men.
- Originally, the walkthrough ended in a remote area featuring Indian tepees. There, guests could meet cast Native Americans. Later, this part was closed, but it is still visible.
