= Frontierland Shootin' Arcade =

Attraction at Disney theme parks

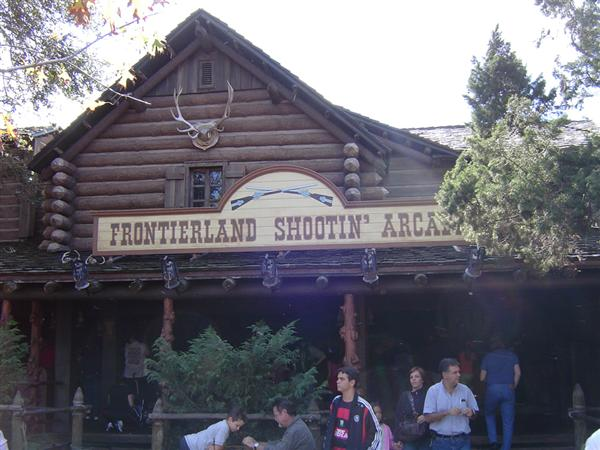
- Arcade at Magic Kingdom, 2006.

Disneyland
- Name: Frontierland Shootin' Exposition
- Area: Frontierland
- Status: Operating
- Opening date: July 17, 1955; 71 years ago

Magic Kingdom
- Area: Frontierland
- Status: Removed
- Opening date: October 1, 1971; 54 years ago
- Closing date: June 23, 2024
- Replaced by: Disney Vacation Club Member Lounge – McKim's Mile House

Tokyo Disneyland
- Name: Westernland Shootin' Gallery
- Area: Westernland
- Status: Operating
- Opening date: April 15, 1983; 43 years ago

Disneyland Park (Paris)
- Name: Rustler Roundup Shootin' Gallery
- Area: Frontierland
- Status: Operating
- Opening date: April 12, 1992; 34 years ago

Ride statistics
- Attraction type: Shooter game
- Theme: American frontier

Frontierland Shootin' Arcade was an attraction in Walt Disney World which simulates a shootout in Tombstone, Arizona, over Boot Hill in 1850. The gallery included a jail, hotel, bank, and cemetery with a total of 97 targets which are animated when shot. After over 50 years of operation, it was closed in 2024.

There are similar versions at Disneyland in Anaheim, California under the name Frontierland Shootin' Exposition, Tokyo Disneyland under the name Westernland Shootin' Gallery, and Disneyland Park (Paris) under the name Rustler Roundup Shootin' Gallery.

== History ==
Originally, the guns shot lead pellets, but were replaced with infra-red light rifles during the summer of 1982, due to the maintenance costs of repainting the targets almost every night. This would use 2,000 gallons of paint a year.

Before September 2021, it was an upcharge attraction and was only free during the park's Halloween festivities. Guests would previously have to pay US$1 for 35 shots. From September 2021 to its closure in 2024, it was free with admission for all park guests at no additional cost.

On June 13, 2024, Walt Disney World Resort announced that Magic Kingdom version of Frontierland Shootin' Arcade attraction would permanently close on June 23, 2024 to make way for a new Disney Vacation Club Member lounge, McKim's Mile House, which will be inspired by exploration and adventure, which would be open on March 18, 2025 at Magic Kingdom.
