= Disneyland Park (Paris) =

Theme park within Disneyland Paris

- Previously known as Euro Disneyland Park (1992-1994)

- Sleeping Beauty Castle, icon of Disneyland Park, in 2002
- Interactive map of Disneyland Park
- Location: Disneyland Paris, Marne-la-Vallée, France
- Coordinates: 48°52′21″N 2°46′36″E
- Status: Operating
- Opened: 12 April 1992; 34 years ago
- Owner: Disney Experiences (The Walt Disney Company)
- Operated by: Euro Disneyland Participations S.A.S.
- Theme: Fairy tales and Disney characters
- Operating season: Year-round
- Website: Official website

Disneyland Park (French: Parc Disneyland), originally Euro Disneyland Park, is a theme park found at Disneyland Paris in Marne-la-Vallée, France. The park opened on 12 April 1992, as the first of the two parks built at the resort. Designed and built by Walt Disney Imagineering, its layout is similar to Disneyland Park at Disneyland Resort in California and Magic Kingdom Park at Walt Disney World in Florida. Spanning 56.656 ha (140 acres)—the second largest Disney park based on the original, after Shanghai Disneyland—it is dedicated to fairy tales and Disney characters.

The park is represented by Le Château de la Belle au Bois Dormant (Sleeping Beauty Castle), a replica of the fairy tale castle seen in Disney Animation's 1959 film Sleeping Beauty. In 2024 the park hosted 10.2 million visitors, making it the tenth-most visited theme park in the world and the most-visited theme park in Europe.

== History ==
In order to make things more distinct and not be a mere copy of the original, modifications were made to the park's concepts and designs. Among the changes was the change of Tomorrowland to Discoveryland, giving the area a retrofuturistic theme. Other altered elements include the Haunted Mansion, which was redesigned as Phantom Manor and a retro, more intense version of Space Mountain (now Hyperspace Mountain). The park's location brought forth its own challenges. Sleeping Beauty Castle (Le Château de la Belle au Bois Dormant) is said by its designers to have been necessarily reevaluated for a continent on which authentic castles stand. Modifications to the park were made to protect against changes in weather in the Parisian climate. Covered walkways referred to as "arcades" were added, and Michael Eisner ordered the installation of 35 fireplaces in hotels and restaurants.

The park, as well as its surrounding complex, initially failed to meet financial expectations, resulting in an image change in which the word "Euro" was phased out of several names, including Euro Disney. The park was known as Euro Disney until May 1994, Euro Disneyland Paris until September 1994, Disneyland Paris until February 2002, and Disneyland Park (English) and Parc Disneyland (French) since March 2002.

Michael Eisner noted, "As Americans, the word 'Euro' is believed to mean glamorous or exciting. For Europeans it turned out to be a term they associated with business, currency, and commerce. Renaming the park 'Disneyland Paris' was a way of identifying it with one of the most romantic and exciting cities in the world."

On 14 March 2020, Disneyland Park, alongside the Walt Disney Studios Park, was temporarily closed due to the ongoing COVID-19 pandemic. Both parks remained closed for four months, resuming operations on 15 July with strict rules such as limited guest attendance, social distancing, and mandatory wearing of face masks. The park closed again on 29 October 2020 following a second nationwide lockdown. The park reopened on 17 June 2021.

== Park layout and attractions ==
Disneyland Park is divided into five themed "lands", which house 49 attractions. Designed like a wheel with the hub on Central Plaza before Sleeping Beauty Castle, pathways spoke out across the 140 acres (57 ha) of the park and lead to the lands. The 3 ft (914 mm) narrow gauge Disneyland Railroad runs along the perimeter of the park and stops in Main Street, U.S.A., Frontierland, Fantasyland and Discoveryland.

Themed Land	Picture	Notes
Main Street, USA		Main Street USA serves as the main entrance boulevard into the park and is themed after early-20th-century small-town America, inspired by Walt Disney's hometown of Marceline, Missouri, complete with a train station and Victorian architecture. The street terminates at the central hub of the park with Sleeping Beauty Castle.
Frontierland		Frontierland is themed after the 19th century American Old West mining town of Thunder Mesa. Features include desert and wilderness landscaping, large rock formations, a river, and frontier architecture.
Adventureland		Adventureland is themed to recreate the feel of the Caribbean, the Middle East, Africa and India. Lush landscaping is abundant throughout the land to give visitors the impression of being in a remote jungle.
Fantasyland		Sleeping Beauty Castle serves as the main entrance to Fantasyland, which is themed after a storybook village taking many architectural traits from various European villages.
Discoveryland		Discoveryland is themed after the visions of famed European thinkers and explorers such as Leonardo da Vinci, HG Wells, or Jules Verne.

=== Main Street, U.S.A. ===
- Liberty Arcade (covered walkway)
- Discovery Arcade (covered walkway)
- Horse Drawn Streetcars (3 ft (914 mm) narrow gauge tramway)
- Main Street Vehicles
- Disneyland Railroad - Main Street Station

=== Frontierland ===
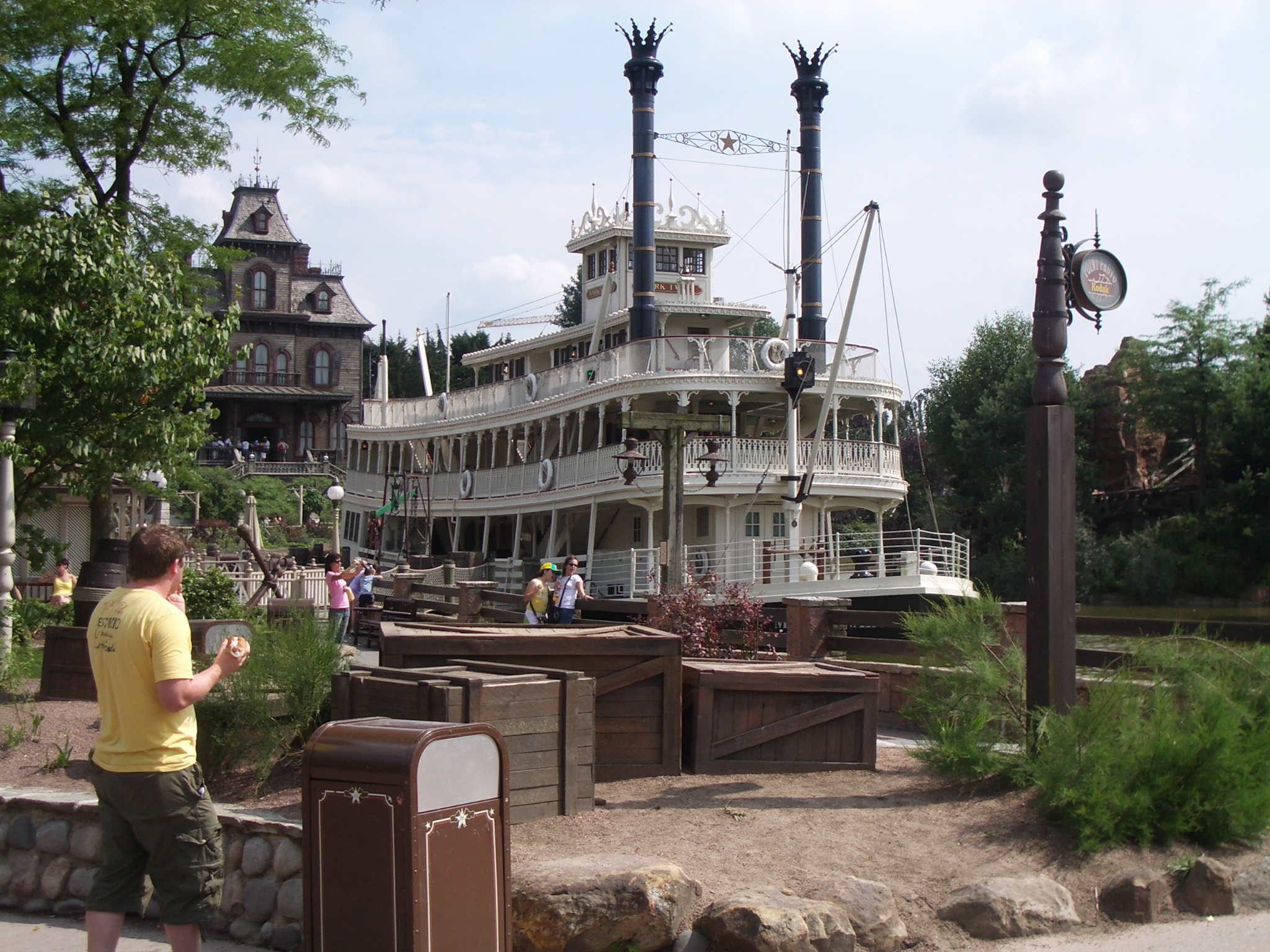
Thunder Mesa Riverboat Landing

- Legends of the Wild West
- Big Thunder Mountain
- Phantom Manor
- Thunder Mesa Riverboat Landing
- Rustler Roundup Shootin' Gallery
- Frontierland Playground
- Disneyland Railroad – Frontierland Depot

=== Adventureland ===
Entrance to Adventureland

- Aladdin's Enchanted Passage
- Adventure Isle
- Swiss Family Treehouse
- Pirates Beach
- Pirates of the Caribbean
- Pirate Galleon
- Indiana Jones and the Temple of Peril

=== Fantasyland ===
- Sleeping Beauty Castle
- The Dragon's Lair
- Lancelot's Carousel
- Snow White and the Seven Dwarfs
- Pinocchio's Daring Journey
- Dumbo the Flying Elephant
- Peter Pan's Flight
- Alice's Curious Labyrinth
- Mad Hatter's Tea Cups
- It's a Small World
- Storybook Land Canal Boats
- Casey Jr. Circus Train
- Meet Mickey Mouse
- Princess Pavilion
- Disneyland Paris Railroad – Fantasyland Station

=== Discoveryland ===
- Buzz Lightyear Laser Blast
- Orbitron
- Autopia
- The Mysteries of the Nautilus
- Hyperspace Mountain
- Star Tours – The Adventures Continue
- Discoveryland Theatre
  - Mickey's PhilharMagic
- Disneyland Railroad – Discoveryland Station

== Attendance ==
- 2008 – 12,688,000
- 2009 – 12,740,000
- 2010 – 10,500,000
- 2011 – 10,990,000
- 2012 – 11,500,000
- 2013 – 10,430,000
- 2014 – 9,940,000
- 2015 – 10,360,000
- 2016 – 8,400,000
- 2017 – 9,660,000
- 2018 – 9,843,000
- 2019 – 9,745,000
- 2020 – 2,620,000
- 2021 – 3,500,000
- 2022 – 9,930,000
- 2023 – 10,400,000
- 2024 – 10,214,000

=== Top 4 amusement parks in Europe by annual attendance (in millions) ===
Disneyland Paris (Parc Disneyland)
Europa-Park
Efteling
Disney Adventure World (Walt Disney Studios Park)

== Shows and parades ==
Disneyland Park hosts a range of daytime and nighttime entertainment throughout the year.

=== Current ===
*As of 6th July 2026

Main parade:
- Disney Stars on Parade: 2017–present

Daytime shows:
- Rhythms of the Pride Lands: 2019–2020, 2022–present
- Sleeping Beauty’s Royal Waltz: 1st July 2026 - Present

Nighttime shows:
- Disney Tales of Magic: 10 January 2025 – present
- Mickey's Goodnight Kiss: 2017–2018, 2021–present *Real life confirmation required

Special or seasonal events, shows, or parades:
- Early season (January – March 2027)
  - No specific season name announced.
  - The 2026 season included:
    - A Million Splashes of Colour: February – September 2024, February – 6th September 2026

- Spring season (April – May 2027)
  - No specific season name announced.
  - The 2026 season included:
    - A Million Splashes of Colour: February – September 2024, February – 6th September 2026

- Summer season (June – September 2026)
  - No specific season name announced.
    - A Million Splashes of Colour: February – September 2024, February – 6th September 2026

- Halloween season [Disney Halloween Festival] (26th September – 1st November 2026)
    - Mickey's Halloween Celebration: 2013–2016, 2018–present

- Christmas season [Disney Enchanted Christmas] (7th November 2026 – 6th January 2027)
    - Mickey's Dazzling Christmas Parade: 2021–present
    - Let's Sing Christmas!: 2018–present
    - (Not Currently Fully Confirmed) Christmas Tree Lighting Ceremony: 1992–2012, 2025 – present

- Seasonal parties
  - Halloween Party:
    - Now part of main season (2023–present).

  - New Years Eve Party:
    - Now part of main season (2023–present).
    - Sparkling New Year's Eve Fireworks: 1992–present

- Anniversaries
  - No current park specific or Disney wide anniversaries open or announced. The next scheduled anniversary (if announced) should be Disneyland Paris' 35th anniversary in 2027.

=== Retired ===
Parades
- Disney Classics Parade (1992–1997)
- Main Street Electrical Parade (Nighttime Parade 1992–2003)
- The Hunchback of Notre Dame Carnival (1997–1998)
- The Wonderful World of Disney Parade (1998–1999 and 2001–2007)
- Disney ImagiNations Parade (1999–2001)
- Disney's Fantillusion (Nighttime Parade 2003–2012)
- Disney's Once Upon a Dream Parade (2007–2012)
- Disney Magic on Parade (2012–2017)

Daytime shows
- Beauty and the Beast (1992–1996)
- Mulan, la Légende (1999–2002)
- Winnie the Pooh and Friends, too (1998–2005, 2006–2011)
- Tarzan: The Encounter (2000–2008, 2011–2012)
- Chantons La Reine des Neiges – Frozen Sing-Along (2015–2018)
- Jedi Training Academy (2015–2017)
- The Forest of enchantment: A Disney Musical Adventure (February – May 2016 & July – September 2017)

Nighttime shows
- Fantasy in the Sky (1992–2005)
- Wishes (2005–2007)
- The Enchanted Fireworks (2008–2012)
- Disney Dreams! (2012–2017, 2023–2024)
  - Disney Dreams! of Christmas (2013–2017, 2022; seasonals)
- Disney Illuminations: (2017–2023, 2024–2025)
- Disney Electrical Sky Parade: (2024–2025)
  - Halloween Scene addition to Disney Electrical Sky Parade: (2024; seasonals)
  - Christamas scene addition to Disney Electrical Sky Parade: (2024; seasonals)

Train parades
- Disney Characters Express (2007–2009)
- Minnie's Party Train (2009–2010)
- Disney All Stars Express (2010–2011)
- Disney Dance Express (2011–2012)
- Disney's 20th Anniversary Celebration Train (2012–2013)
- Minnie's Little Spring Train (2015–2016)

Events & seasonal shows (Most recently retired)
- Early season
  - Disney Symphony of Colours (Early & Spring seasons 2024)
- Spring season
  - Disney Music Festival (April – September 2025)
- Summer season
  - The Lion King & Jungle Festival (2019–2020)
    - Jungle Book Jive (2019–2020)
- Halloween season
  - Are You Brave Enough? (2019)
  - The Disney Villains Halloween Parade (2017–2019)
- Christmas season
  - Disney Princesses Holiday Season Celebration: a magical waltz (2025)
  - Mickey's Magical Christmas Lights (2015–2020)
  - Disney's Christmas Parade (2012–2019)
  - Ready for the Night (2022/23 New Year Parade)

Anniversary specific celebrations & events
- 25th anniversary (2017–2018)
  - The Starlit Princess Waltz (2017–2018)
  - Mickey Presents Happy Anniversary Disneyland Paris (2017–2018)
- 30th anniversary & 30th anniversary Grand Finale (2022 – September 2023)
  - Dream... and shine brighter (2022–2023)
  - Disney D-light (v1.0: 2022 – 11 April 2023, v2.0: 12 April – 29 September 2023, 'Final day' version 30 September 2023 only)

== Gallery ==
Thunder Mesa Riverboat Landing in Frontierland

At night

Horse tram

Old-time vehicle in Main Street, U.S.A.

== See also ==
- Rail transport in Walt Disney Parks and Resorts
