= Single rider =

Opportunity at various theme parks

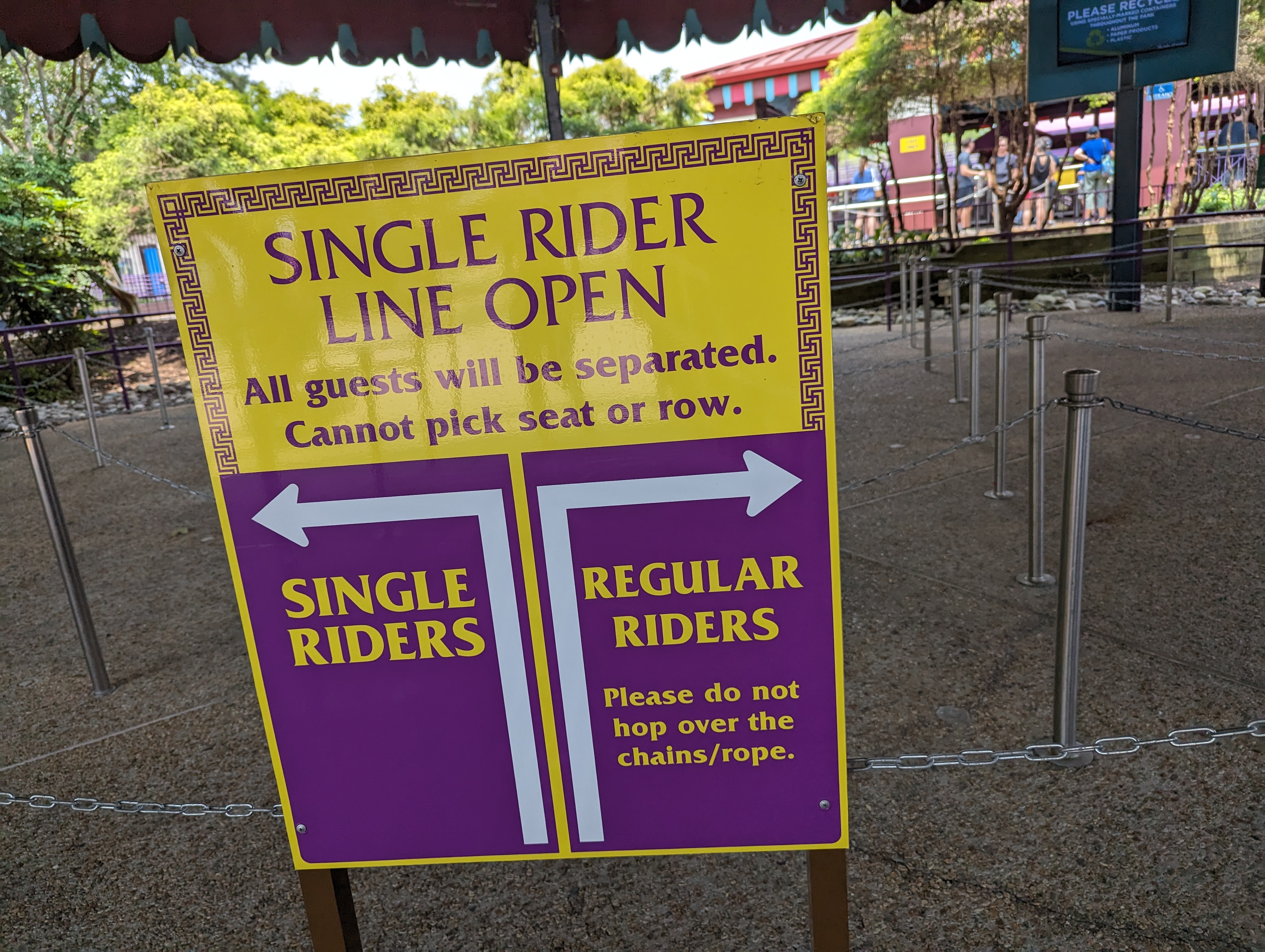
Single rider entrance on Apollo's Chariot at Busch Gardens Williamsburg

Single rider is a type of queue at theme park attractions for people riding by themselves, reducing the amount of time spent waiting in line for an attraction. When a single-rider line is in use, empty seats on the ride vehicles are filled using individuals from the line, thus ensuring that every vehicle is carrying the maximum number of occupants possible thus improving ride efficiency, ride capacity, and ride throughput. A park using a single-rider line offers guests a chance to wait for a significantly shorter length of time in exchange for not necessarily being able to experience the attraction with others in their party or from a desired seat (e.g., the front row of a roller coaster).

== Origin ==
In a memo dated July 31, 1958, Walt Disney directed the Disneyland Operations Committee to "Establish a special line for single riders, with the request that they double up."

== Operations ==
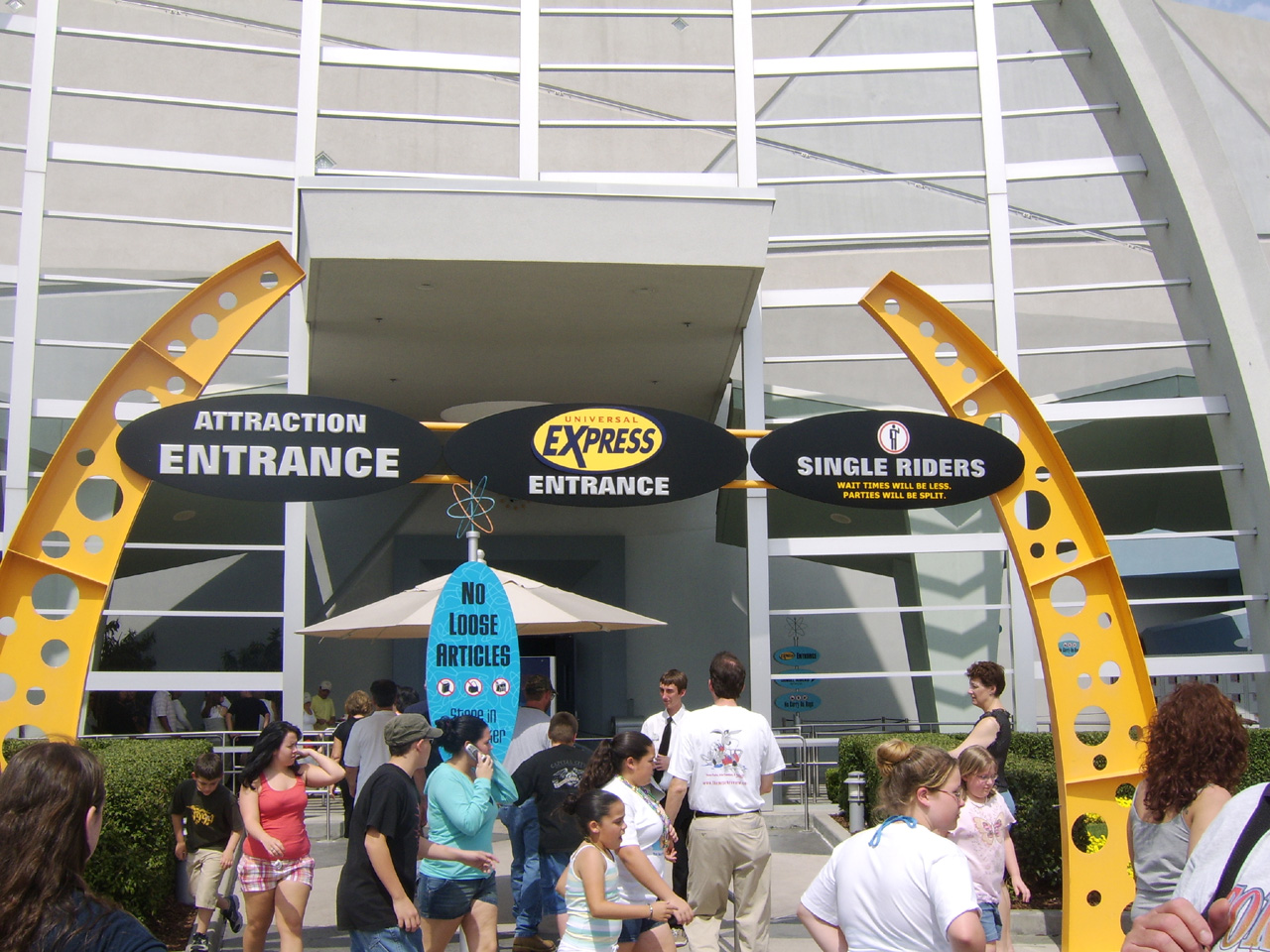
Single rider entrance on Men in Black: Alien Attack at Universal Studios Florida

In practice, a single-rider line is available adjacent to the main entrance of the attraction. It is often staffed by a park employee who will remind guests of any important policies. The line may bypass pre-show elements of the attraction; again, this is a trade-off that allows a much shorter wait in line. Typically, the line ends at the loading platform, where another employee is stationed. This employee will sort out the arriving guests from the main line and direct them to the ride vehicles. When an empty seat becomes available, the employee will direct the person at the front of the single-rider line to take the empty seat.

The actual movement of the line is subject to many variables, including the loading speed of the attraction and, sometimes, the park's management style for dealing with such lines. Some parks will use single riders to fill odd-numbered seating configurations every time, while others will actively attempt to balance out the ride vehicle with guests in the main line, even inviting guests from further back in the main line to come forward and board. Generally, single rider lines are used for rides which have vehicles of four to eight people and are popular. Single rider lines can reduce wait times by 80% or more. Some rides may seat three individuals across, and due to the number of couples that visit theme parks, the third individual is needed to fill the row. Because single rider lines are normally used to fill up otherwise empty seats, they have no direct, negative impact on the main queue. This is different from paid priority queues, in which visitors are allowed to jump the main queue for an upcharge, taking away available rides.

In most cases, a guest using a single-rider line must meet the normal rider requirements for the attraction and must be able to ride in any empty seat presented. Therefore, a number of park guests are generally discouraged from using these lines, such as:

- Younger guests, who may not meet the height requirement for the attraction but would otherwise be able to ride if a parent or guardian was present (a responsibility the park will not impose on a stranger)
- Handicapped guests, who might require special wheelchair seating or need assistance from a member of their party to board the attraction
- Guests with larger frames (some muscular or obese guests), who would require a specific seat (one modified for larger guests) to experience the attraction

Single-rider lines may be discontinued at the discretion of the park at any time, usually when there is no perceivable benefit to using the line. This can occur during off-peak operating days when the regular wait is very short already. Similarly, it may be temporarily discontinued when the single-rider line length creates waits that are longer than those for the regular line.

Some parks provide provisions for visitors who are alone, regardless of whether a "single-rider line" is designated.

Although not specifically a single-rider plan, some parks provide provisions for parents of children who are too small or young for an attraction. One party waits with the non-riders, until a responsible adult returns, then the waiting party enters the front of the single-rider line or another line.

== See also ==
- Disney's Fastpass
