= The Muppets Present...Great Moments in American History =

Live show at the Magic Kingdom

Coordinates: 28.4193°N 81.5824°W

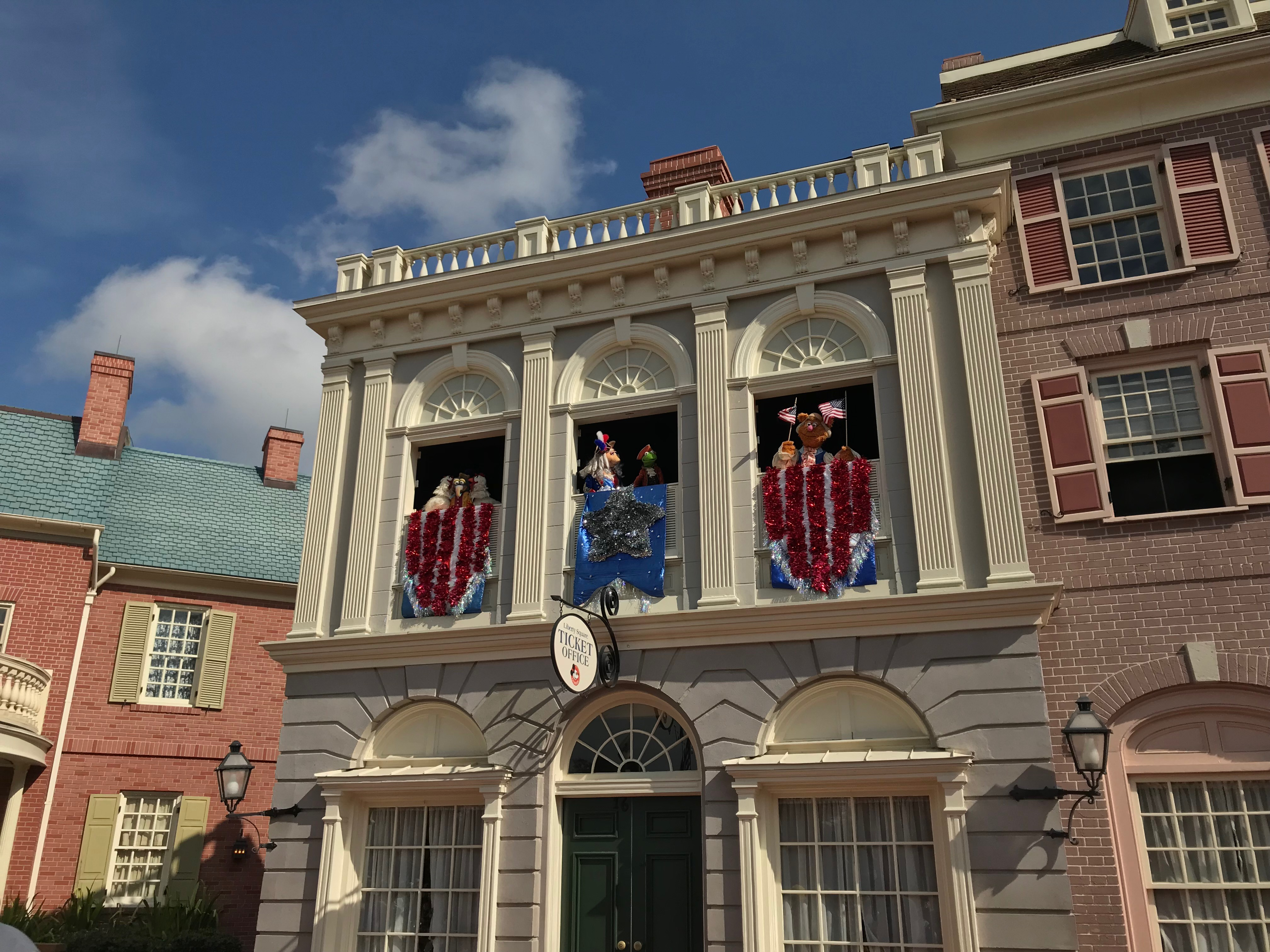

Magic Kingdom
- Area: Liberty Square
- Status: Removed
- Opening date: October 2, 2016
- Closing date: February 17, 2020

Ride statistics
- Attraction type: Puppet show
- Designer: Disney Live Entertainment
- Theme: The Muppets, American history
- Music: Valerie Vigoda and Brendan Milburn
- Duration: 7–11 minutes
- Wheelchair accessible

The Muppets Present ... Great Moments in American History was a live show located in the Liberty Square area at the Magic Kingdom, performed daily and featured the Muppets presenting abridged accounts of notable milestones from the Colonial era of American history and its majority unfolded from the second-story windows of the Heritage House, adjacent to the Hall of Presidents attraction. The show premiered on October 2, 2016 and went on a brief hiatus on October 5, 2019, before temporarily returning three months later for a brief holiday run from December 23 to 31, 2019 before closing on February 17, 2020 due to the COVID-19 pandemic closure. This was the last Muppets production to feature Steve Whitmire before his dismissal from the role of Kermit and other characters sometime in the same month of October 2016.

The Muppets are physically performed live in the show by the park's in-house puppeteers in synchronization to a pre-recorded dialogue track. The Muppets Studio and Muppet performers Steve Whitmire, Eric Jacobson, and Dave Goelz provided consultation, as well as recording the voices for their respective characters.

== Show ==
Kermit the Frog, Miss Piggy, Fozzie Bear, Gonzo, and Sam Eagle are featured in the show. A live cast member portrays James "J.J." Jefferson, the town crier who engages the audience in the "Declaration of Independence" sketch.

Each show performance features one of the following sketches:

- Declaration of Independence — Sam and J.J. narrate the events that unfolded during the 1776 Second Continental Congress in Philadelphia, and the eventual drafting of the Declaration of Independence. The historical figures included here are Thomas Jefferson (portrayed by Kermit), John Adams (portrayed by Gonzo), and Benjamin Franklin (portrayed by Fozzie). Miss Piggy portrays the dual gender role reversal of George Washington and King George III.
- Midnight Ride of Paul Revere — Sam retells Henry Wadsworth Longfellow's 1860 poem, "Paul Revere's Ride", depicting the subject of Paul Revere's (portrayed by Kermit) historical "Midnight Ride".

=== Voice cast ===
- Steve Whitmire as Kermit the Frog
- Eric Jacobson as Miss Piggy, Fozzie Bear, and Sam Eagle
- Dave Goelz as Gonzo

== Development ==
The show's development started in the spring of 2014, following the release of Muppets Most Wanted. Originally, the show was only going to feature Sam Eagle interacting with guests and telling them about American history. However, it was later decided that, to make the show more entertaining, Kermit, Miss Piggy, Fozzie Bear, and Gonzo would be added in. Jim Lewis was asked to provide consultation on the show's scripts. Due to the distance between guests and the Muppet characters, the puppets are made 5% larger than the size traditionally used for film and television.
