= Admiral Joe Fowler Riverboat =

Riverboat attraction at Walt Disney World

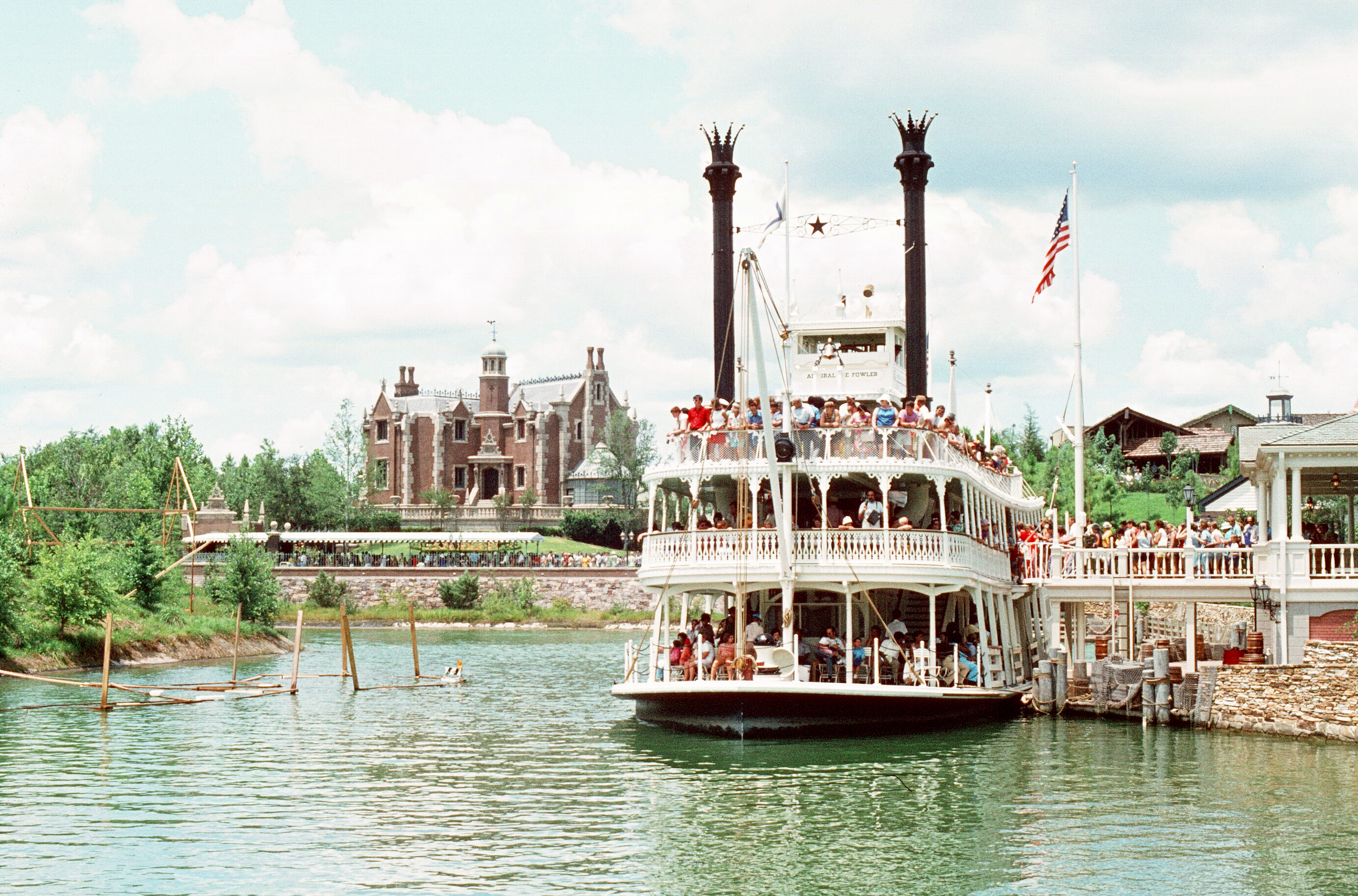
- The Admiral Joe Fowler Riverboat in 1972

Magic Kingdom
- Area: Liberty Square
- Status: Closed
- Opening date: October 2, 1971
- Closing date: 1980
- Replaced by: Miss Fritter's Daredevil Spin-Along, Cars Ridge Run Rally & Villains Land

Ride statistics
- Ticket: D
- Wheelchair accessible

The Admiral Joe Fowler was a Disney riverboat ride vehicle. The riverboat was named after Park Construction Administrator Joe Fowler, a former US Navy rear admiral who was in charge of the construction of both Disneyland and Walt Disney World. In 1980, it was completely destroyed after being dropped by a crane attempting to lift the riverboat into the dry dock area.

== History ==
The Admiral Joe Fowler riverboat was built at the Tampa Ship Repair & Dry Dock Inc. in Tampa, Florida, the same place where the Walt Disney World Railroad's four steam locomotives were refurbished. The riverboat entered service a day after the Magic Kingdom park opened on October 1, 1971. On May 20, 1973, a second riverboat named the Richard F. Irvine, which would later be renamed as the Liberty Belle in 1996, entered service.

But in late 1980, the Admiral Joe Fowler riverboat was accidentally dropped from a crane while being lifted into the dry dock area for a routine overhaul, and its hull was completely destroyed beyond repair. The damaged riverboat was taken to a boneyard for a while before being broken up for scrap as it was decided that the Magic Kingdom park no longer needed two riverboats in the Rivers of America. The riverboat's steam engine machinery was being shipped to Tokyo Disneyland to be used as part of the Mark Twain riverboat.

In 1997, the Magic Kingdom I ferry, which crosses the Seven Seas Lagoon taking guests between the Transportation and Ticket Center and the Magic Kingdom park, was renamed to Admiral Joe Fowler. The Magic Kingdom II ferry was renamed to Richard F. Irvine.

== See also ==
- Disney riverboats
