= Liberty Square (Magic Kingdom) =

Area in Disney World in Florida, U.S.

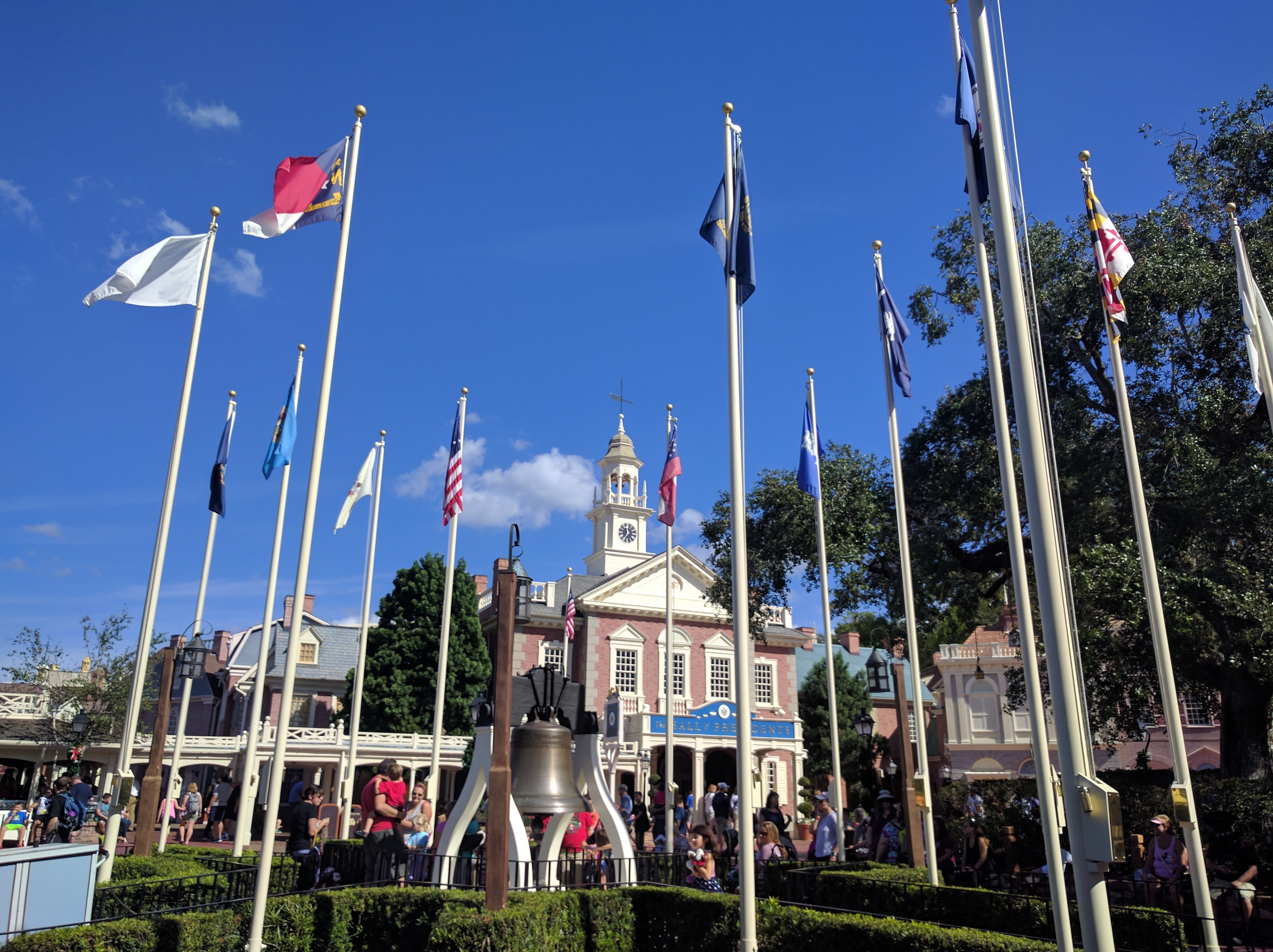
- Replica Liberty Bell at Liberty Square, Magic Kingdom
- Interactive map of Liberty Square
- Coordinates: 28.4194°N 81.5825°W
- Theme: Colonial America

Magic Kingdom
- Status: Operating
- Opened: October 1, 1971

Liberty Square is one of six "themed lands" and is exclusive to the Magic Kingdom, a theme park at the Walt Disney World Resort in Bay Lake, Florida. Themed after colonial America, Liberty Square contains replicas of both the Liberty Bell and Liberty Tree. One of the most popular attractions in the Magic Kingdom, the Haunted Mansion, is located in this land. Presiding over the square is the Hall of Presidents, an American history show featuring an Audio-Animatronics figure of all 45 Presidents of the United States.

== History ==
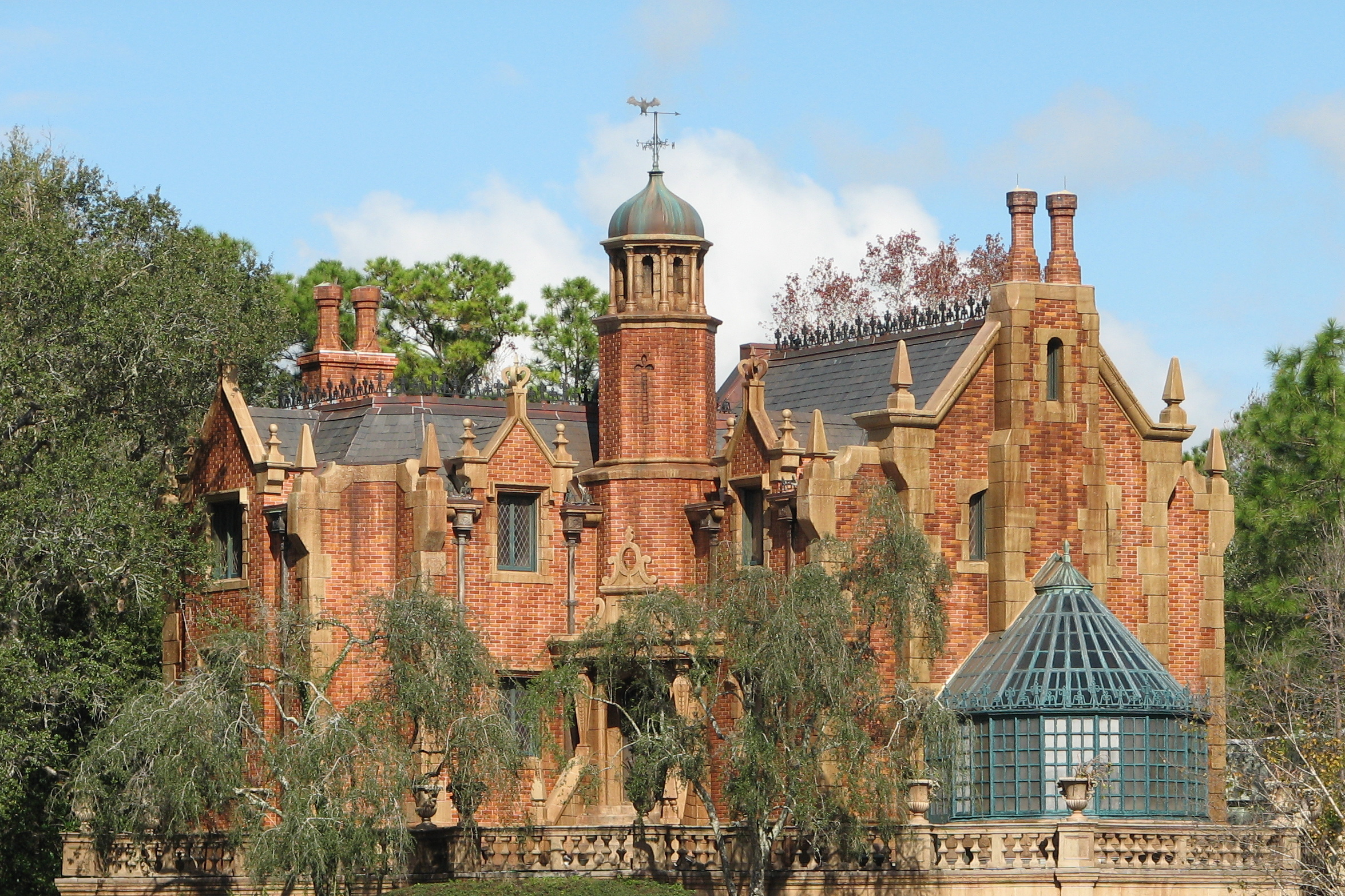
The Haunted Mansion

Originally conceived as an annex to Main Street USA for Disneyland in Anaheim named Liberty Street, the idea was revisited when the Magic Kingdom was being designed in the late 1960s. The need arose for an area analogous to, but distinct from New Orleans Square at Disneyland. Walt Disney Imagineering decided on an early American, eighteenth century theme, with special concentration on the American Revolutionary War, as the Bicentennial would occur soon in 1976.

Liberty Square opened as part of the Magic Kingdom and Walt Disney World's grand opening on October 1, 1971, as one of the original six themed lands. It is located in the northwest corner, bordering Fantasyland and Frontierland. The Square also has bridges to the park's central hub, as well as Adventureland. Forming its western border was the Rivers of America until its closure in July 2025, on which the Liberty Belle riverboat traveled. It is also the smallest land by guest area in the Magic Kingdom.

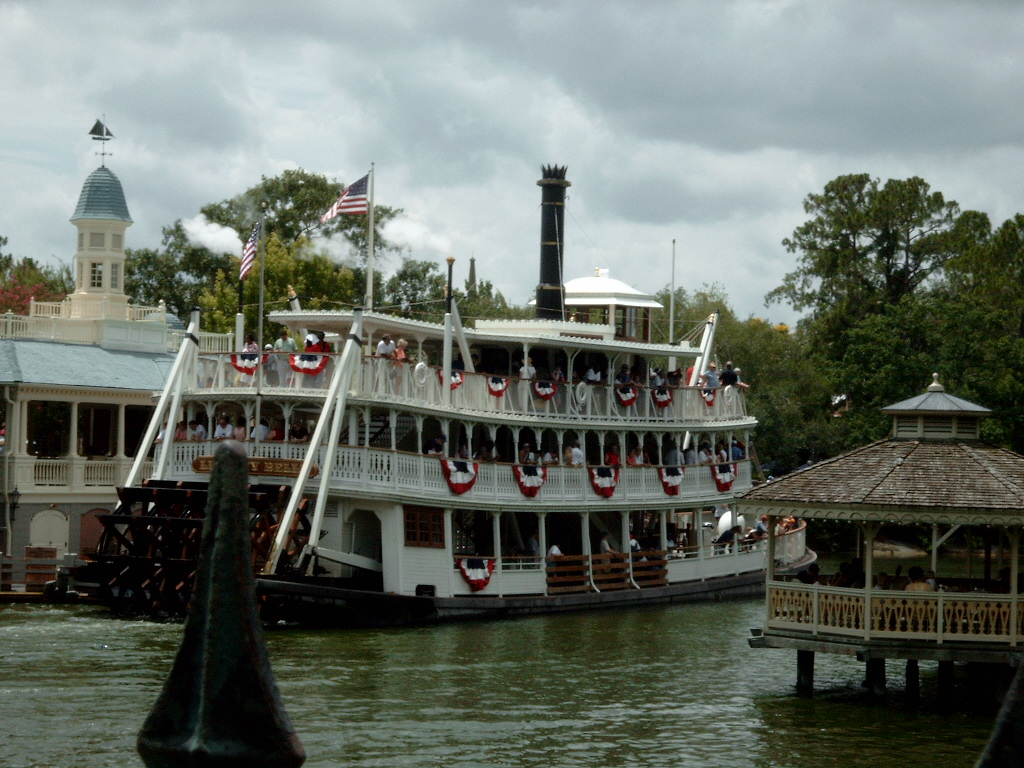
The former Liberty Belle Riverboat at its mooring

The theming in the Square is comprehensive and accurate to the time period, from major architectural and engineering homages to the small antiques and artifacts peppered throughout the many attractions and dining locations.

On July 28, 2016, it was announced that a new live show, The Muppets Present…Great Moments in American History starring the Muppets, would be coming to the area outside the Hall of Presidents in October 2016. The show took place throughout the day, with the Muppets sharing their own take on American history and a new song. The show was discontinued in 2019.

At D23 Expo in August 2024, it was announced that a section of Frontierland will be redeveloped into Miss Fritter's Daredevil Spin-Along & Cars Ridge Run Rally, 2 attractions themed to the American wilderness from Pixar's Cars franchise and Villains Land which will replace Tom Sawyer Island, Rivers of America and Liberty Belle Riverboat. In June 2025, it was announced that Tom Sawyer Island, Rivers of America and Liberty Belle Riverboat would close on July 7, 2025.

== Design ==
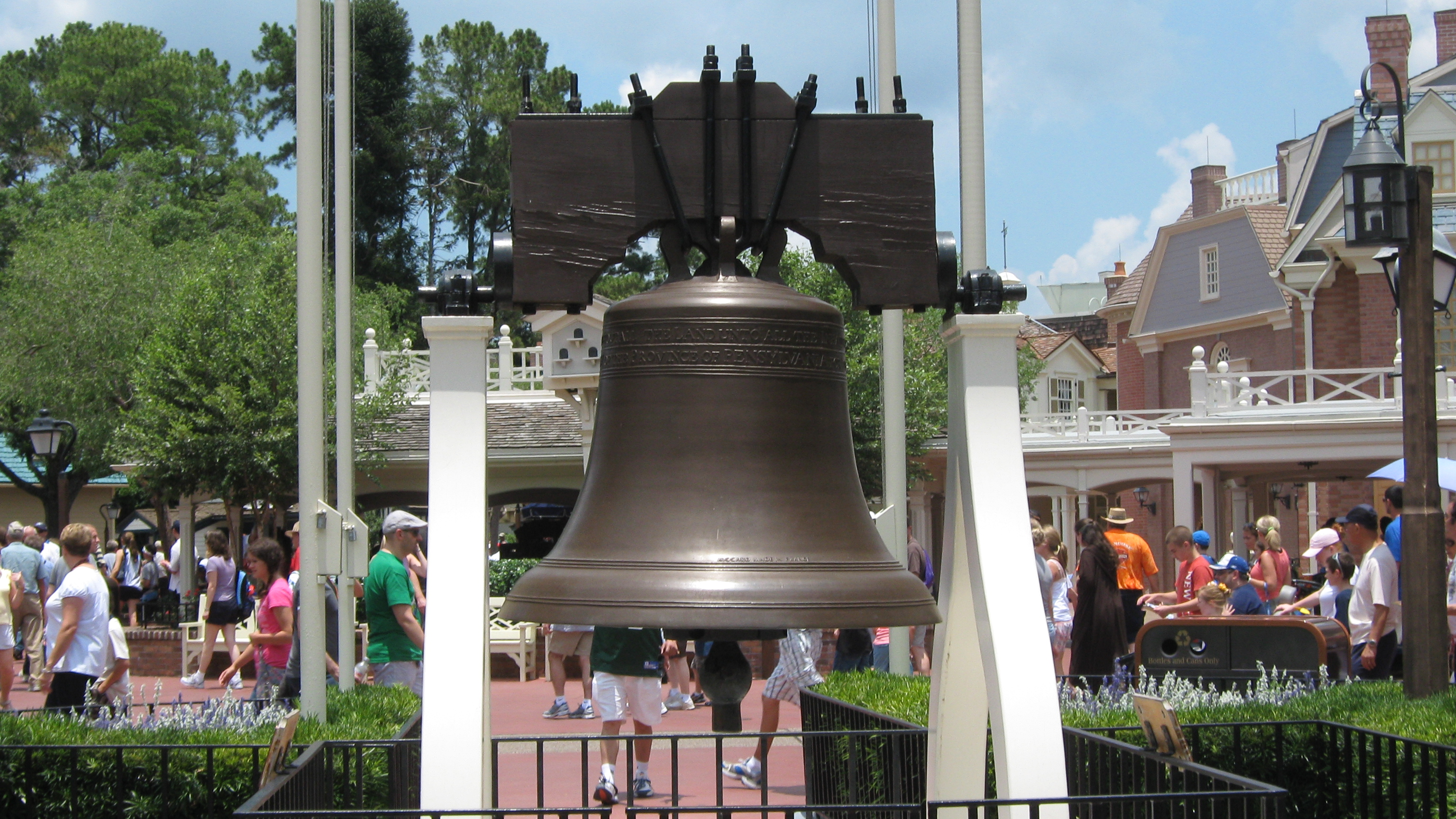
Liberty Square's Liberty Bell Replica

- Liberty Square begins an architectural progression through history and geographically across the United States. This progression begins with the Haunted Mansion (1770s or '80s, upstate New York) and traveled clockwise around the former Rivers of America into Frontierland terminating at Big Thunder Mountain Railroad (1880s, southern California).
- A replica of the House of Burgesses features Paul Revere's lanterns signifying "two if by sea" in an upstairs window.
- The Liberty Tree is an actual 100-year-old oak found on the property and transplanted, with a younger oak grafted into the base.
- The Liberty Bell replica was cast from the mold of the actual Liberty Bell in 1989. An urban legend falsely claims that it is one of two bells ever cast from this mold, however there are many others also cast from it. Yet another urban legend claims that this bell is the one that was cast for Pennsylvania, as one of the 50 cast for states in 1976. According to the legend, Pennsylvania gave it to Walt Disney World since they already had the original. However, Pennsylvania's replica is located in Allentown.
- There are architectural representations of each of the original Thirteen Colonies.
- The state flags of each of the original 13 states, as well as the American flag, fly in a plaza in the center of Liberty Square.

== Land details ==
Note: ▲ = Genie Plus / Lightning Lane available

Table-Service Restaurants

- Liberty Tree Tavern – Americana colonial themed restaurant.

Quick-Service Food

- Columbia Harbour House – a nautical-themed two-story quick service location.
- Sleepy Hollow Refreshments – named after The Legend of Sleepy Hollow that was adapted into the 1949 Disney film The Adventures of Ichabod and Mr. Toad.
- Liberty Square Market – an outdoor farmers market, the main location for turkey legs.

Attractions

- The Hall of Presidents

Rides

- The Haunted Mansion ▲

Points of Interest

- The Enchanted Glade Gazebo – located behind the Christmas Shoppe, primarily used for Character greetings.
- Heritage House – formerly a gift shop, it now serves as a Guest Relations desk.
- Replicas of the Liberty Tree and Liberty Bell are found in the center of Liberty Square.
- Historic artifacts from various presidents and first ladies are on display in the lobby of the Hall of Presidents.

Merchandise

- Memento Mori – specializes in Haunted Manson merchandise.
- Ye Old Christmas Shoppe – a year-round Disney Christmas store. The store features a personalized ornament station.
- Liberty Square Parasol Cart – features specialty and custom parasols.
- Liberty Square Caricature & Cameo Cart

=== Former ===
- Rivers of America
  - Admiral Joe Fowler Riverboat (1971–1980)
  - Mike Fink Keel Boats (1971–2001)
  - Liberty Belle Riverboat (1973–2025)
- The Muppets Present...Great Moments in American History (2016–2020)
