= Peter Renaday =

American actor (1935–2024)

- Born: Pierre Laurent Renoudet; June 9, 1935; New Iberia, Louisiana, U.S.
- Died: September 8, 2024 (aged 89); Burbank, California, U.S.
- Occupation: Actor
- Years active: 1965–2019
- Spouse: Florence June Renoudet (nee Daniel) (m. 1979; died 2011)

Peter Renaday (born Pierre Laurent Renoudet; June 9, 1935 – September 8, 2024) was an American actor. During a career spanning some six decades, Renaday worked in television, film, voice work, theme parks, radio, and theatre. He is best known for providing the voice of Splinter in the original Teenage Mutant Ninja Turtles animated television series, as well as voicing Abraham Lincoln in The Hall of Presidents, The Grim Adventures of Billy & Mandy, and Evil Con Carne, Henry and Max in Country Bear Jamboree at Magic Kingdom in Walt Disney World, and Easy Pete in Fallout: New Vegas.

== Early life ==
Renaday was born in New Iberia, Louisiana, on June 9, 1935.

== Career ==
He made his acting debut in 1965 in television series Combat!, and in the 1980s, Renaday was cast in Teenage Mutant Ninja Turtles as Splinter, a large mutant rat, who serves as the sensei (mentor) and ninjitsu and martial arts trainer of the eponymous turtles from 1987 until the show's finale in 1996. Renaday would also reprise the role of Splinter during the non-musical spoken portions of the live action TMNT: Coming Out of Their Shells concert event during the inaugural show held and recorded at Radio City Music Hall in 1990.

Renaday voiced Abraham Lincoln in the Magic Kingdom attraction The Hall of Presidents. In addition, he voiced caricatures of Lincoln in Evil Con Carne, The Grim Adventures of Billy & Mandy and Batman: The Brave and the Bold. In 2011, Renaday voiced Sir George in the third season of Ben 10: Ultimate Alien.

== Personal life ==
Renaday was married to Florence "Flo" June Daniel from 1979 until her death on February 18, 2011. Daniel worked as a secretary in the music department of the Walt Disney Studios for 35 years, including as executive secretary to two heads of the department. A coloratura soprano, Daniel was also featured as a vocalist on "The Sounds of Christmas" produced by Disneyland Records in 1973, alongside Renaday.

== Death ==
Renaday died at his home in Burbank, California, on September 8, 2024, at the age of 89 from natural causes.

== Filmography ==
=== Film ===
Year	Title	Role	Notes	Source
1966	Lt. Robin Crusoe, U.S.N.	Pilot		
1968	The One and Only, Genuine, Original Family Band	Dakota Townsman	Uncredited	
1968	The Love Bug	Policeman on Bridge		
1969	The Computer Wore Tennis Shoes	Lt. Hannah		
1970	The Aristocats	French Milkman, La Petit Cafe cook, Truck Mover (voice)	Uncredited	
1971	The Barefoot Executive	Policeman #1		
1971	The Million Dollar Duck	Mr. Beckert		
1972	Michael O'Hara the Fourth	Stan	Television film	
1973	The Mystery in Dracula's Castle	Detective	Television film	
1974	The Whiz Kid and the Mystery at Riverton	Reporter	Television film	
1975	The Strongest Man in the World	Reporter		
1976	The Shaggy D.A.	Roller Derby Ticket Taker	Uncredited	
1977	The Rescuers	American Delegate (voice)	Uncredited	
1978	The Cat from Outer Space	Bailiff		
1979	The Apple Dumpling Gang Rides Again	Fort Jailer		
1980	The Last Flight of Noah's Ark	Irate Pilot		
1981	The Devil and Max Devlin	Studio Engineer		
1981	Murder in Texas	Funeral Director	Television film	
1984	The River Rat	Cajun Doctor		
1985	The Black Cauldron	Horned King's Henchman (voice)		
1987	Ultraman: The Adventure Begins	Cajun, Paramedic (voice)	Television film	
1992	Bebe's Kids	Announcer, Abraham Lincoln, Impericon, Tommy Toad (voice)		
1993	T'was the Day Before Christmas	Lester (voice)	Television film; uncredited	
1997	Cats Don't Dance	Narrator (voice)		
1998	Antz	Soldier Ants (voice)		
1998	The Odd Couple II	Justice of the Peace		
1998	Mulan	Hun Army (voice)		
1999	Scooby-Doo! and the Witch's Ghost	Mr. McKnight (voice)	Direct-to-video	
2005	Tugger: The Jeep 4x4 Who Wanted to Fly	Pa Pump (voice)		

=== Television ===
Year	Title	Role	Notes	Source
1965	Combat!	Louis	Episode: "The Tree of Moray"	
1983	Dallas	Rigsby	Episode: "Barbecue Four"	
1984–1985	Kidd Video	Master Blaster (voice)		
1985	G.I. Joe: A Real American Hero	Dr. Marsh, Amen-Ra (voice)	Episode: "The Gods Below"	
1985–1986	The Transformers	Grapple, Lord Chumley (voice)	8 episodes 1 episode	
1986	Defenders of the Earth	Mandrake the Magician (voice)	Main role	
1987–1996	Teenage Mutant Ninja Turtles	Splinter/Hamato Yoshi, Vernon Fenwick (season 2-8), General Traag, Chrome Dome, Don Turtelli, Pinky McFingers, Big Louie, Leatherhead (in "Night of the Rogues"), Various other roles (voice)	Main role	
1990	TaleSpin	William Stansbury (voice)	Episode: "Her Chance to Dream"	
1991	Darkwing Duck	Derek Blunt (voice)	Episode: "In Like Blunt"	
1992	Batman: The Animated Series	Second Longshoreman (voice)	Episode: "Terror in the Sky"	
1993	Animaniacs	Abraham Lincoln, Bailiff (voice)	2 episodes	
1994	Aladdin	Man (voice)	Episode: "Getting the Bugs Out"	
1994	Gargoyles	Subway Facility Commander, Fortress Captain, Father	3 episodes	
1995	Phantom 2040	The Spectacular Steele (voice)	Episode: "The Magician"	
1995	Iron Man	Howard Stark (voice)	Episode: "Not Far from the Tree"	
1995–1999	The Sylvester & Tweety Mysteries	Louie Z, Anna, Auctioneer, Announcer (voice)	3 episodes	
1996	The Real Adventures of Jonny Quest	Kane, High Lama (voice)	2 episodes	
1997	Nothing Sacred	Director	Episode: "Spirit and Substance"	
1997–1998	Superman: The Animated Series	Captain, Clerk, News Anchor (voice)	4 episodes	
1998	The New Batman Adventures	Auctioneer (voice)	Episode: "The Demon Within"	
2001	Godzilla: The Series	Georges (voice)	Episode: "The Ballad of Gens Du Marais"	
2001–2005	The Grim Adventures of Billy & Mandy	Abraham Lincoln, various voices (voice)	9 episodes	
2002	Samurai Jack	Priest, Tan Zang (voice)	2 episodes	
2003	Angel	The Beast's Master	2 episodes	
2003–2004	Evil Con Carne	Abraham Lincoln (voice)	3 episodes	
2010–2011	Batman: The Brave and the Bold	Uncle Sam, Abraham Lincoln (voice)	2 episodes	
2011	Ben 10: Ultimate Alien	Sir George (voice)	5 episodes	

=== Video games ===
Year	Title	Role	Notes
1997	Outlaws	Chief Two Feathers, Cowboy #1	
1999	Revenant	Lord Tendrik	
2001	Metal Gear Solid 2: Sons of Liberty	Richard Ames	
2004	Viewtiful Joe 2	Dr. Cranken	
2005	Shadow of Rome	Cicero	
2005	From Russia with Love	M	
2005	The Matrix: Path of Neo	Key Maker, Architect, Police	
2006	Dead Rising	Sean Keanan	
2006	Marvel: Ultimate Alliance	Odin, Namor	
2007	Jeanne d'Arc	Richard	
2007	Assassin's Creed	Al-Mualim	
2008	Lost Odyssey	King Gohtza	
2008	Ninja Gaiden II	Dagra Dai	
2009	Dragon Age: Origins	Duncan	
2010	Fallout: New Vegas	Easy Pete	
2011	Gears of War 3	Adam Fenix	
2011	Assassin's Creed Revelations	Al-Mualim	

=== Audio drama ===
- Star Wars: Tales of the Jedi: Dark Lords of the Sith – Exar Kun
- Adventures in Odyssey – numerous characters (1994–2015)

=== Theme park attractions ===
- The Hall of Presidents – Abraham Lincoln
- Country Bear Jamboree – Henry the M.C., Max the Deer
- 20,000 Leagues Under the Sea: Submarine Voyage – Captain Nemo
- The Many Adventures of Winnie the Pooh – The Narrator (Magic Kingdom, Disneyland and Hong Kong Disneyland versions)
- Tomorrowland Transit Authority PeopleMover – Narrator (1994 to 2009)
- Buzz Lightyear Astro Blasters – Space Ranger #1 (Disneyland versions only)

=== Albums ===
- Mickey Mouse Splashdance – Mickey Mouse
- Yankee Doodle Mickey – Mickey Mouse
- The Story and Song of the Haunted Mansion – The Ghost Host (original voice, but replaced by Paul Frees in The Haunted Mansion attraction)

=== Toys ===
- The Talking Mickey Mouse – Mickey Mouse

=== Shorts ===
- A Distant Thunder – Harold Shenson
- Cellar Doors – Frank
- Dad... Can I Borrow the Car? – Actor
- Obliteration – Doctor
- The Visitant – Narrator

=== Video ===
- Terrifying Tales – Additional voices
