= Joe Fowler =

Rear admiral of the United States Navy

- Born: July 9, 1894; Lewiston, Maine, U.S.
- Died: December 6, 1993 (aged 99); Orlando, Florida, U.S.
- Military career
- Allegiance: United States
- Branch: United States Navy
- Service years: 1917–1948
- Rank: Rear Admiral
- Conflicts: World War I World War II

Joe Fowler (July 9, 1894 – December 6, 1993) was a rear admiral of the United States Navy, who after his retirement had an important role in overseeing the construction of Disneyland and Walt Disney World. Joe Fowler attended the United States Naval Academy and later earned a master's degree from the Massachusetts Institute of Technology in Naval Architecture. He retired from the Navy in 1948 though he was recalled briefly during the Korean War. In 1952 he was appointed by President Truman to reduce wasteful military spending.

== Disney career ==
In 1954 Walt Disney was looking for a naval expert to help with the building of the paddle steamer Mark Twain, for the then under-construction Disneyland. Through C. V. Wood, he found the retired admiral supervising the construction of tract homes in the San Francisco Bay Area. Fowler was hired by Walt as the construction boss for the entire Disneyland project, not just a paddle steamer. After Disneyland was completed, Fowler stayed on as General Manager of the park for its first 10 years, and assisted with the construction of Walt Disney World.

"At one point during the Florida project, Joe held three posts, simultaneously: senior vice president, engineering and construction, for Walt Disney Productions; chairman of the board of WED Enterprises, now known as Walt Disney Imagineering; and director of construction for Disney’s Buena Vista Construction Company." He retired from The Walt Disney Company in 1978, though he continued to work for the company as a consultant. In 1990, Fowler was honored as a Disney Legend.

The dock for the two large ships in Disneyland's Rivers of America, located across from The Haunted Mansion is named Fowler's Harbor. In 1999, one of the ferries that crosses the Seven Seas Lagoon taking guests from the Ticket and Transportation Center to the Magic Kingdom was renamed Admiral Joe Fowler in his honor; it was originally known as the Magic Kingdom I.
