= Sundown (1941 film) =

1941 film

- Theatrical release poster
- Directed by: Henry Hathaway
- Written by: Charles G. Booth; Barré Lyndon
- Produced by: Jack Moss; Walter Wanger
- Starring: Gene Tierney; Bruce Cabot; George Sanders
- Cinematography: Charles Lang
- Edited by: Dorothy Spencer
- Music by: Miklós Rózsa
- Color process: Black-and-white
- Production company: Walter Wanger Productions
- Distributed by: United Artists
- Release date: October 16, 1941
- Running time: 90 minutes
- Country: United States
- Language: English
- Budget: $1.2 million
- Box office: $873,808

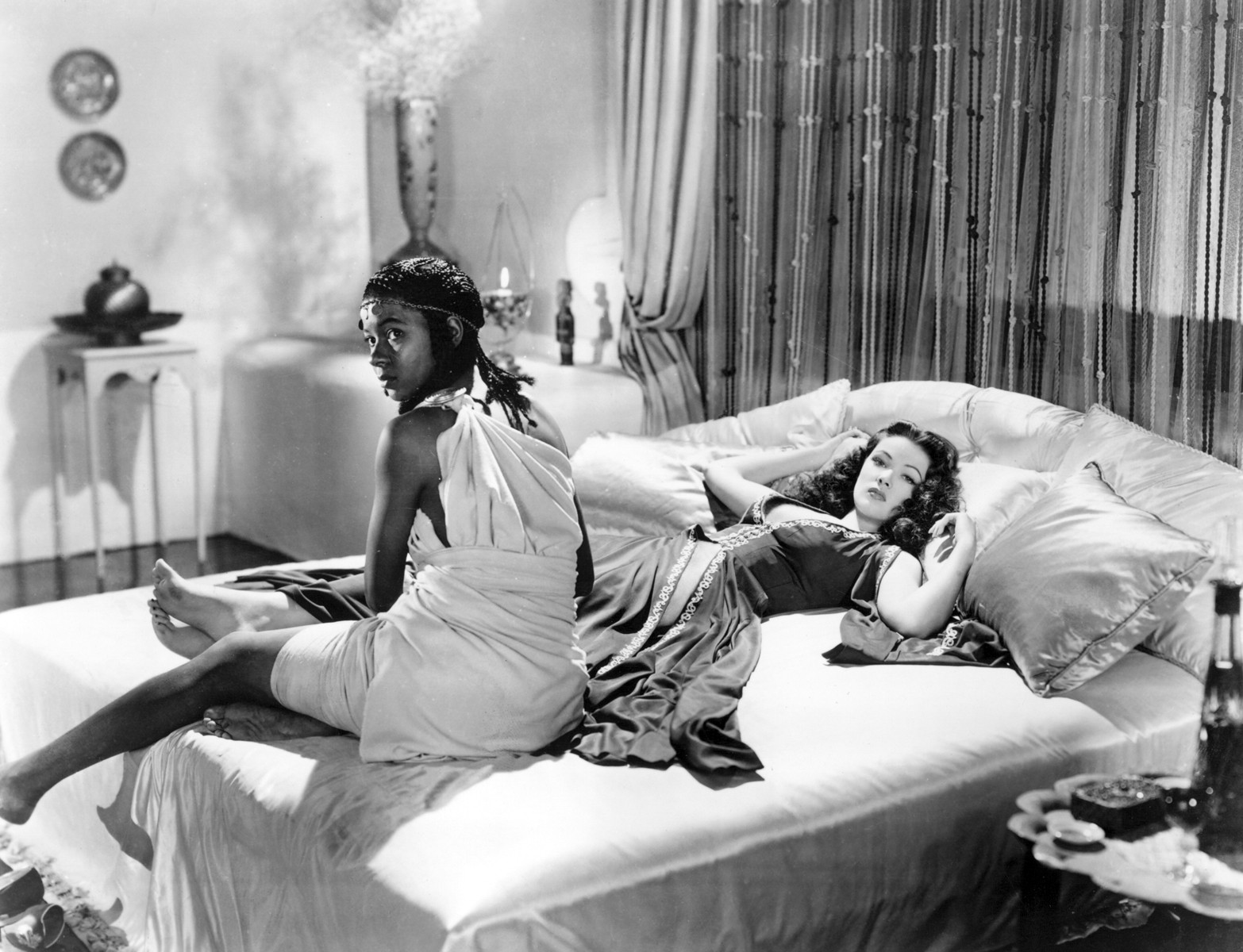
Jeni Le Gon and Gene Tierney in Sundown (1941)

Sundown is a 1941 American war drama film directed by Henry Hathaway and starring Gene Tierney, Bruce Cabot and George Sanders. It was produced by Jack Moss and Walter Wanger, written by Charles G. Booth and Barré Lyndon, and released by United Artists. Set in British East Africa, the film's adventure story was well received by critics, earning three Academy Award nominations, but it was a failure at the box office.

== Plot ==
An aircraft lands in Kenya near Rhino Rock, and Zia (Gene Tierney) disembarks and is met by a caravan she owns. In Manieka, British East Africa, Bill Crawford (Bruce Cabot), District Commissioner, contacts the governor at Nairobi, requesting a month-long furlough to study the Senshi, a local tribe. His colleague, Lt. Roddy Turner (Reginald Gardiner), sends a message to the governor to cancel the furlough as the Senshi are becoming hostile.

Two aircraft land at Manieka, bringing both rifles and Major Coombes (George Sanders), the Governor's agent. Coombes tells Crawford that he is taking control of the outpost. When he finds Pallini (Joseph Calleia), officially an Italian prisoner of war, but unofficially the chef, Coombes wants Pallini put into restraints. He then asks Crawford why he wants a furlough, saying that someone is smuggling rifles to the Senshi.

Dutch engineer Jan Kuypens (Carl Esmond), hired by the Italian government, is making a mineral survey of the area. Coombes suggests that Kuypens instead file his report with the British; he agrees.

A local trader named Abdi Hammud (Marc Lawrence) sets up an ambush of the British troops, but Crawford and his men are able to stop the attack. Zia, daughter of the late Abu Kalli, who now runs the family network of trading posts in East Africa, arrives at the outpost.

Pallini has known Zia for many years, and on Pallini's birthday, the outpost decides to throw him a party. The men make sure they invite Zia, but when she arrives, she must sit at a segregated table because by native custom she is considered a half-breed. Crawford sits with her and discovers that she is African.

The locals believe that one of the six white men will die that night. But there are only five of them at the party. When the white hunter, Dewey (Harry Carey), arrives, everyone else suddenly disappears. Two locals shoot at Crawford, but they miss, while Zia is grazed by a bullet. One of the attackers is killed and turns out to be the trader Hammud, responsible for the earlier ambush.

The suspicious Coombes orders Zia to leave the outpost, despite her slight wound. Kuypens confronts Zia in her quarters, who quickly recognizes his German accent. Kuypens is a Nazi agent who is bringing in rifles to arm the Senshi. She agrees to go with him, but passes a warning message to Pallini to give to Crawford. Before Pallini is able to deliver it, Kuypens kills him. Pallini becomes the one (of the six) fated to die that night.

The men find his body and Crawford decides to pursue Kuypens. Crawford confers with Dewey on where Kuypens will go. His rock samples, being volcanic, lead Crawford and Dewey to a geographic area they know. Their armed reinforcements follow shortly behind.

Zia is taken to a large cave complex where the rifles are being prepared. Crawford and Dewey find one of the arms stores and manage to blow up some rifles and ammunition. They also find the large cave complex; Dewey goes back to bring up their reinforcements.

Kuypens informs Zia that he knows that she is actually the daughter of Graham Fletcher, who, along with her mother, died when Zia was just two years old. Abu Kalli adopted her and raised her as an Arab.

Crawford is captured, and is placed in a large cell with Zia, who tells him that the Senshi will attack Marieka the following day. Crawford suspects that she is working with Kuypens, but she finally convinces him that he is wrong. The two escape by tricking their guards, but a shoot-out between them, Kuypens, and the guards ends with Zia being captured. Crawford plays dead, then overpowers the guard sent to finish him off.

Coombes and Dewey arrive with the British reinforcements, foiling the attack on Marieka. During the battle, Coombes is able to shoot Kuypens, but not before the Nazi agent fatally wounds him. Later in London, Zia and Crawford are married before attending a large memorial service for Major Coombes. Afterward, they make their plans to return to Africa.

== Cast ==
- Gene Tierney as Zia
- Bruce Cabot as Captain William Crawford
- George Sanders as Major A.L. Coombes
- Harry Carey as Dewey
- Joseph Calleia as Pallini
- Reginald Gardiner as Lt. Roddy Turner
- Carl Esmond as Jan Kuypens
- Marc Lawrence as Abdi Hammud
- Sir Cedric Hardwicke as Bishop Coombes
- Gilbert Emery as Ashburton
- Jeni Le Gon as Miriami
- Emmett Smith as Kipsang
- Dorothy Dandridge as Kipsang's Bride
- Prince Modupe as Miriami's Sweetheart
- John Pickard as Pilot
- Blue Washington as Askari Veteran
- William R. Dunn as Kipsang's Victim
- Woody Strode as Tribal Policeman

== Production ==
Producer Walter Wanger worked out some deals with other studios to assemble an impressive cast and crew for Sundown. The 21-year-old star Gene Tierney was on loan from 20th-Century Fox "on the condition that she was given sole top billing in all advertising". (Note: Film critic and historian Leonard Maltin described Tierney as "better known for her beauty than her talent".) Wanger also borrowed Henry Hathaway from Paramount Pictures to direct the epic.

Barre Lyndon wrote the screenplay based on his novel, which had been successfully serialized in The Saturday Evening Post early in 1941. Although the setting was to be in Kenya and the eastern deserts of Africa, location shooting took place in "Hollywood's oft-used Bronson Caverns" in Hollywood Hills, California's Mojave Desert, and, at Hathaway's suggestion, the high desert plains in the Shiprock area of New Mexico, site of ancient Pueblo settlements. (Note: During production of Sundown, several of the camels became dehydrated and drank too much water too quickly, causing them to become intoxicated. The camels had to be run in the heat until they regained their composure.)

== Reception ==
Film historian Leslie Halliwell described Sundown in Leslie Halliwell's Film Guide (1989) as "artificial looking romantic actioneer with (a) good cast".

Film reviewer Hal Erickson, wrote in AllMovie.com that Sundown was "... impressively photographed (by Charles Lang) and directed (by Henry Hathaway), 'Sundown' just misses being as profound as it obviously wants to be".

According to Variety, Sundown earned theatrical receipts in the US of $1,050,000. The film was a financial failure, losing $658,824.

=== Award nominations ===
The following were nominated for Academy Awards:

- Charles Lang for Best Cinematography
- Miklós Rózsa for Original Score
- Alexander Golitzen and Richard Irvine for Best Art Direction

== Release ==
The film premiered in Los Angeles, California, on October 16, 1941. It went into wide theatrical release on October 31 of that year. It was re-released theatrically by Masterpiece Productions in 1948.

=== Television ===
The film had its television premiere on a television station in Chicago, Illinois, on April 24, 1950, syndicated by Masterpiece Productions. Eventually, Time-Life Films acquired Trans-Beacon Corporation, who owned the rights to this and several other Masterpiece Productions titles, such as Stagecoach, Slightly Honorable, Foreign Correspondent, and Trade Winds, and placed those films into the Time-Life Television syndication package.

=== Home media ===
As Vestron Video never had the complete rights to this film, alongside Slightly Honorable and The Woman of the Town, other companies, including United American Video Corporation (UAV Corp.), Alpha Video, Madacy Entertainment Group, Inc. and VCI Entertainment, have been able to release home video versions of Sundown for the past decades, with the quality of the prints used varying by distributor. Its first video release occurred in 1980, when Time-Life Video issued it on the VHS and Betamax videocassette formats, and on August 24, 2010, Turner Classic Movies released a restored version of the film on the DVD-R format.
