= Slightly Honorable =

- Poster
- Directed by: Tay Garnett; Charles Kerr (assistant)
- Written by: Ken Englund (screenplay); John Hunter Lay (screenplay); Robert Tallman (screenplay)
- Based on: Send Another Coffin by F.G. Presnell
- Produced by: Walter Wanger; Tay Garnett
- Starring: Pat O'Brien; Edward Arnold; Broderick Crawford
- Cinematography: Merritt B. Gerstad
- Edited by: Otho Lovering; Dorothy Spencer
- Music by: Werner Janssen
- Production company: Walter Wanger Productions
- Distributed by: United Artists
- Release date: 22 December 1939
- Running time: 85 minutes
- Country: United States
- Language: English
- Budget: $434,874
- Box office: $386,116

Slightly Honorable is a 1939 American mystery film directed by Tay Garnett and starring Pat O'Brien, Edward Arnold, and Broderick Crawford. The film was based on the 1939 novel Send Another Coffin by Frank Gilmore Presnell, Jr. (1906–1967).

== Cast ==
- Pat O'Brien as John Webb
- Edward Arnold as Vincent Cushing
- Broderick Crawford as Russ Sampson
- Ruth Terry as Ann Seymour
- Alan Dinehart as District Attorney Joyce
- Claire Dodd as Alma Brehmer
- Phyllis Brooks as Sarilla Cushing
- Eve Arden as Miss Ater
- Douglass Dumbrille as George Taylor
- Bernard Nedell as Pete Godena
- Douglas Fowley as Madder
- Ernest Truex as P. Hemingway Collins
- Janet Beecher as Mrs. Cushing
- Evelyn Keyes as Miss Vlissingen
- John Sheehan as Mike Daley
- Addison Richards as Inspector Fromm
- Cliff Clark as Captain Graves

== Reception ==
The film recorded a loss of $107,709.

== Home media ==
As Vestron Video never owned the complete rights to this film, alongside Sundown and The Woman of the Town, other companies such as Video Treasures and Alpha Video have been able to release home video versions of Slightly Honorable for the past decades, with the quality of the prints used varying by distributor. The first home video release was in 1980, when Time-Life Video released it on the Betamax and VHS formats, and on April 17, 2012, Mill Creek Entertainment released a digitally restored version of the film on DVD as part of their Dark Crimes: 50 Movie Set DVD box set.
