= Liberty Belle Riverboat =

Former riverboat attraction at Magic Kingdom

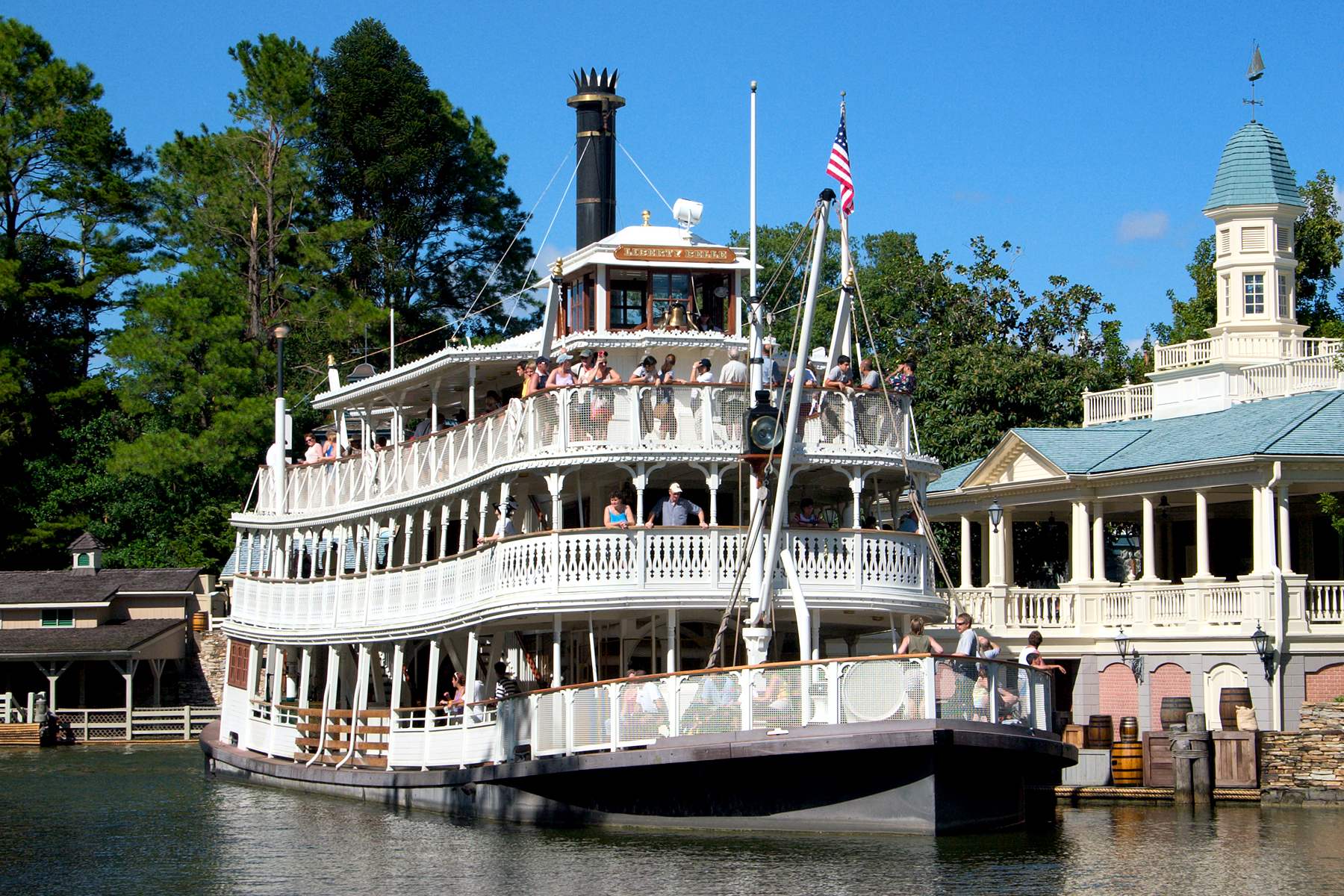
- The Liberty Belle Riverboat in October 2005

Magic Kingdom
- Area: Liberty Square
- Coordinates: 28.4196°N 81.5829°W
- Status: Closed
- Opening date: May 20, 1973
- Closing date: July 7, 2025

Ride statistics
- Vehicle type: Sternwheeler
- Riders per vehicle: 450 riders
- Duration: About 20:00
- Ticket: D (formerly)
- Wheelchair accessible

The Liberty Belle (formerly Richard F. Irvine) was a steam-powered riverboat ride vehicle at Rivers of America in Magic Kingdom. A steam-powered sternwheeler replica, it was the second boat ride vehicle to be introduced in this attraction and originally named after the late Disney executive Richard F. Irvine.

== History ==
The Richard F. Irvine was the second riverboat to enter into service on May 20, 1973, in the Rivers of America at the Magic Kingdom park. Its other riverboat colleague, the Admiral Joe Fowler, served from October 2, 1971, through fall 1980 when it was destroyed in a dry dock accident. The Richard F. Irvine was completely refurbished and returned to service in 1996 as the Liberty Belle. Everything except for the hull, boiler, and engines was stripped off, and an all-new superstructure was constructed from aluminum and vinyl. The Richard F. Irvine name would later be reintroduced on one of the ferry boats that travel between the Magic Kingdom and the Transportation and Ticket Center, having been renamed from Magic Kingdom II in 1997.

The Liberty Belle underwent an extensive rehab from September 2005 to September 2006 and returned as an attraction ride vehicle. Between late October 2009 and early January 2010, the Liberty Belle was used for a live show called Tiana's Showboat Jubilee to promote Disney Animation's 2009 film The Princess and the Frog. In 2018, the Liberty Belle was completely overhauled with a new boiler.

In August 2024, Disney announced that the Magic Kingdom version of Rivers of America would be closed to make way for an area themed to the American wilderness from Pixar's Cars franchise and Villains Land. The Liberty Belle closed on July 7, 2025 for that expansion, with its final sailings being held on July 6. As of August 2025, the Liberty Belle riverboat is docked at a backstage marina in the Walt Disney World Resort area.

== See also ==
- Disney riverboats
