= Richard Irvine =

American art director

- Born: April 5, 1910; Salt Lake City, Utah, U.S.
- Died: March 30, 1976 (aged 65); Los Angeles, California, U.S.
- Occupation: Art director
- Years active: 1939-1953

Richard "Dick" Irvine (April 5, 1910 – March 30, 1976) was an American art director. He is best known for his Academy Award nomination in the category Best Art Direction for the 1941 black and white film Sundown. Over his long career, he worked as an art director in 31 films between 1939 and 1953.

In the early 1950s, Walt Disney asked Irvine to help Construct Disneyland. He moved from 20th Century Fox to the Walt Disney Studio in 1952 and became a senior figure at Walt Disney Imagineering (WDI). Until his retirement in 1973, he headed design and planning for all Disneyland attractions including the Haunted Mansion and Pirates of the Caribbean. Irvine became executive vice president and chief operations officer at WDI in 1967.

== Personal life ==
Irvine was born in Salt Lake City, Utah, on April 5, 1910, the son of a prominent ophthalmologist in Los Angeles, California. Following his graduation in Stanford University and the University of Southern California, he attended the Chouinard Art Institute.

Irvine died on March 30, 1976, in Los Angeles, California, after suffering an illness that prevented him from visiting the complete Walt Disney World Resort, which opened in 1971. In his honor, one of the original Walt Disney World riverboats was named after him (See Richard F. Irvine Riverboat). However, it was renamed the Liberty Belle in 1996, following which one of the Magic Kingdom ferries was named in his honor.

He was named a Disney Legend in 1990.

== Selected filmography ==
- Sundown (1941)
- The Three Caballeros (1944)
- Miracle on 34th Street (1947)
