= The Hall of Presidents =

Attraction at the Magic Kingdom

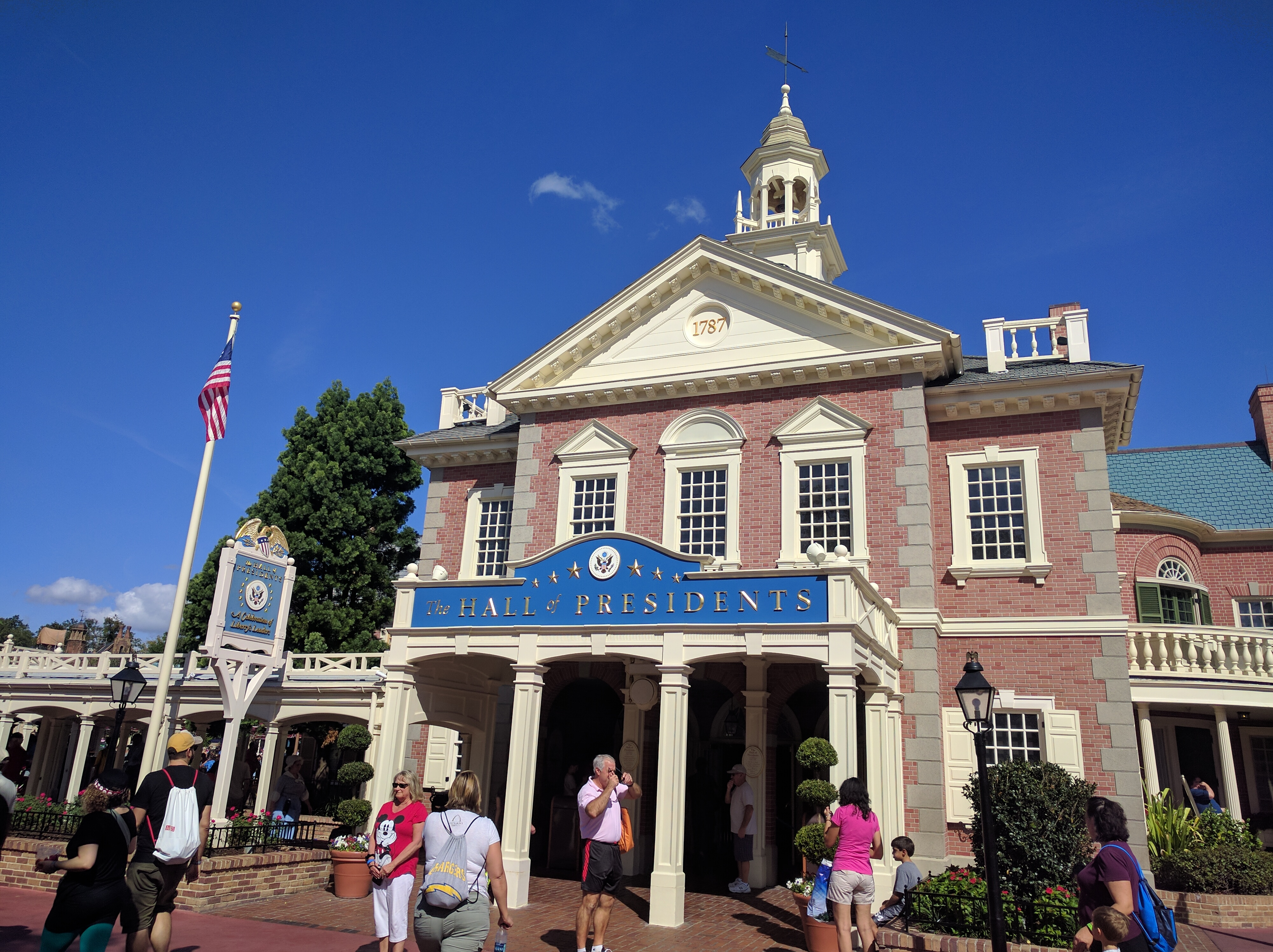

Magic Kingdom
- Area: Liberty Square
- Status: Operating
- Opening date: October 1, 1971

Ride statistics
- Attraction type: Multimedia and Audio-Animatronic show
- Model: Theater
- Theme: The American presidency
- Audience capacity: 700 per show
- Duration: 25 minutes
- Audio-Animatronics: Yes
- Wheelchair accessible
- Assistive listening available
- Closed captioning available

The Hall of Presidents is a theater attraction located in Liberty Square in the Magic Kingdom Park at the Walt Disney World Resort. The attraction is a multimedia presentation featuring Audio-Animatronic figures of all 45 individuals who have served as president of the United States. (Note: As of 2026. While there have been 47 presidencies, only 45 individuals have served as president. Grover Cleveland and Donald Trump each served two presidencies.) Originally conceived by Walt Disney as an attraction for Disneyland Park in California, the show opened on October 1, 1971, along with the rest of the Magic Kingdom.

== History ==
=== Disneyland and Liberty Street ===
In 1957, as Disneyland in Anaheim, California, became more successful, Walt Disney proposed an expansion of the park's Main Street, U.S.A. area that celebrated America's colonial era. Called Liberty Street, it would have been a representation of Colonial Boston on the eve of the American Revolution (which coincided with Disney's film adaptation of Johnny Tremain).

The new Liberty Street area would have hosted two attractions. The first was "The Hall of the Declaration of Independence," a stage show featuring a re-creation of the signing of the Declaration of Independence with lifelike figures of Benjamin Franklin, Thomas Jefferson, and the like. The second attraction was another stage show—"The Hall of the Presidents of the United States," featuring an immersive film presentation and figures of every U.S. president.

The Disneyland Liberty Street concept was eventually abandoned, but work continued on the "Hall of Presidents" concept for many years. Disney asked director James Algar to work on the show concept and story. Algar would eventually become the show's lead director and producer.

Originally conceived as wax figures, Disney became more ambitious and wanted the president figures to move and talk. But technical limitations of the time made it impossible without a huge amount of funding for research and development. Disney, Algar, and the rest of the team prepared an extensive presentation to entice corporate sponsors to back the project.

=== Great Moments with Mr. Lincoln ===
In 1961, Walt Disney saw potential in having the "Hall of Presidents" as a centerpiece attraction in a pavilion at the 1964-1965 New York World's Fair and retitled the concept "One Nation Under God." Disney was already producing several attractions for the fair. However, every corporation Disney pitched the show to turned them down—either for financial or content reasons (companies thought the show didn't convey their own message).

Disney thought a tangible example of the potential of the show was necessary and asked his Imagineers to work on a mock-up figure of one president. They concentrated their efforts on Disney's favorite: Abraham Lincoln. The Lincoln figure's face was created by Disney animator turned sculptor Blaine Gibson using a copy of a life mask of Lincoln made by Leonard Volk in Chicago in 1860.

In early 1962, Robert Moses, president of the 1964-1965 New York World's Fair Corporation, visited the Walt Disney Studio to see how Disney's two (at the time) fair projects were coming along. Moses saw the Lincoln mock-up, and the Imagineers got the figure to stand and extend its hand to Moses. Moses told Disney that he had to have the presidents show at the fair. Despite knowing that the figure was years from completion, Disney told Moses it would be ready—but only with Lincoln.

The show opened as Great Moments with Mr. Lincoln at the world's fair in 1964 and was among the most popular attractions at the fair. A version of Great Moments with Mr. Lincoln opened at Disneyland in July of 1965.

=== Magic Kingdom ===
Walt Disney died on December 15, 1966, and plans moved ahead for the Walt Disney World Resort near Orlando, Florida. Part of the plans included another Disneyland-style theme park, known as the Magic Kingdom. Imagineers resurrected the plans for The Hall of Presidents to provide the park a new experience. After deliberating about where to put the attraction, Imagineers reviewed and revised the old designs and concepts for the Disneyland Liberty Street, which became Liberty Square. This worked out because Florida's close proximity to the real New Orleans in Louisiana, made a New Orleans Square in the Magic Kingdom a bit superfluous.

Because the attraction had been in development for over a decade, a great deal of research had already been done—including referencing thousands of paintings, photographs, periodicals, and books. Imagineers also visited Washington, D.C., and Colonial Willamsburg for more research material.

The film media portion of the attraction was supervised by longtime film art director John DeCuir Sr., who led a team of a dozen Imagineering artists to create 85 paintings—each one done in the style of the time it was depicting. Disney Legend Ub Iwerks developed a special camera process to capture the paintings on film, which measured 40 feet wide, for the theater's five-panel widescreen. This was Iwerks' last project for Disney before he died in 1971.

The Audio-Animatronic figures of the presidents (numbering 36 at that time) were sculpted by Blaine Gibson, who had sculpted the original Lincoln figure for the world's fair. All of the figures were finished and costumed to make them appear as authentic as possible—down to the stitching of the costumes. The figures were placed on the stage based on their stature (because of his relatively small height, James Madison was seated). The wigs were made in Guatemala and painstakingly detailed and cut for accuracy.

The Hall of Presidents opened with the Magic Kingdom on October 1, 1971, to great acclaim. The attraction was featured during the Grand Opening of Walt Disney World television special, which aired on October 29, 1971. It was introduced on the show by country music star Glen Campbell.

As new presidents were inaugurated in the years following the attraction's 1971 opening, Blaine Gibson returned to sculpt each new figure added to The Hall of Presidents. Gibson stated that his intent with each figure was to "render the uniqueness of an individual"—pulling out details that reflect each president's personality. Gibson's final contribution to the attraction was the sculpt of George W. Bush in 2001. Abraham Lincoln and George Washington are A-100 model Audio-Animatronic figures, a line of the most advanced, lifelike, and expressive human figures that Walt Disney Imagineering has ever built.

== The attraction ==
Though the content has changed over the decades, the presentation of The Hall of Presidents has changed very little. All versions of the attraction begin with a film presentation, followed by a lifting of a curtain to reveal all of the presidents on stage.

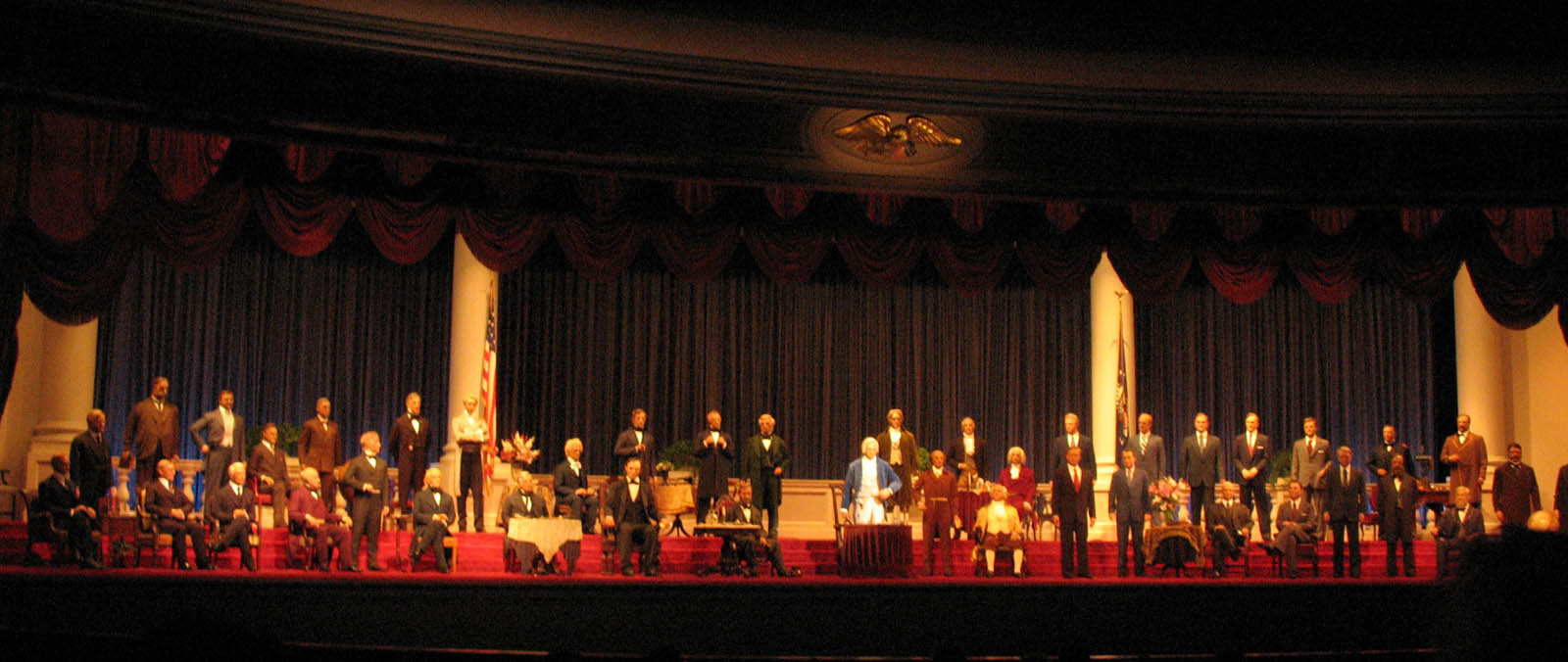
The 2001–09 version of The Hall of Presidents (pictured in April 2007), featuring a speech by George W. Bush

=== Original version (1971–1993) ===
"If a free world is to endure, then the principles of self-government must be perpetuated. The Constitution is the rock. And the leaders of tomorrow must be as dedicated to its preservation as were the leaders of yesterday, as are the leaders of today."

The original version of The Hall of Presidents, narrated by actor Lawrence Dobkin, was focused on the Constitution of the United States—its formation, role in preserving liberty, and the tests it has endured throughout American history.

After a recitation of the preamble to the Constitution the film portion began at the Constitutional Convention in 1787. After much debate and discussion, both George Washington and Benjamin Franklin make speeches to the delegates in favor of ratification of the Constitution.

After the ratification of the Constitution and the election of Washington as the first president, the first test of the new republic came with the Whiskey Rebellion of 1791. With Washington being willing to "ensure domestic tranquility" and personally lead the federal militia to engage the rioters, the rebellion was quelled.

Decades later in 1832, President Andrew Jackson dealt with the nullification crisis, which included threats of secession by the Southern states led by John C. Calhoun. Jackson's strength and force of character helped reach a compromise.

But talk of secession would emerge again in the time of Abraham Lincoln. The film then segued to a re-creation of the Lincoln-Douglas debates in 1858—with Lincoln (voiced again by Royal Dano from Great Moments with Mr. Lincoln) invoking the truths of the Declaration of Independence. But the divide over slavery widens and two years later, Lincoln is elected president and the Southern states secede, leading to the American Civil War. A montage of paintings show the devastation of the conflict. But the Constitution survived, making America a truly unified nation.

After the Civil War ends, an era of progress and expansion occurs—with the film highlighting milestone events like the transcontinental railroad, the Wright brothers' flight, Thomas Edison's light bulb, and more. All the while, the Constitution remained the fundamental rock of the country upon which all the freedom was based.

The film then turned toward the future, saying that the leaders of tomorrow have to be committed to the Constitution and its principles if human liberty is to survive. A Saturn V rocket took off in the center screen, and all the screens lifted to reveal the stage.

After the curtain lifted, the Audio-Animatronic figures of all of the presidents of the United States were revealed on stage. As their names are called in chronological order and a spotlight focuses on each one, they respond with a nod, bow, or other sign of acknowledgment. During the stage presentation, the presidents seem to fidget, talk to each other, and look around—enhancing the illusion of life.

Abraham Lincoln then stood and took center stage. His speech shared a lot of lines and characteristics to the one the Lincoln figure gave in Great Moments with Mr. Lincoln:

"This government must be preserved in spite of the acts of any man or set of men. Nowhere in the world is presented a government of so much liberty and equality. To the humblest and poorest among us are held the highest privileges and positions.

What constitutes the bulwark of our liberty and independence? It is not the frowning battlements, or bristling seacoast, our army and navy. These are not our reliance against tyranny. Our reliance is in the love of liberty which God has planted in us. Our defense is in the spirit which prizes liberty as the heritage of all men, in all lands everywhere. Destroy this spirit and you have planted the seeds of despotism at your own doors.

At what point shall we expect the approach of danger? By what means shall we fortify against it? Shall we expect some transatlantic giant to step the ocean and crush us at a blow? Never.

All the armies of Europe, Asia, and Africa combined could not, by force, take a drink from the Ohio or make a track on the Blue Ridge. At what point, then, is the approach of danger to be expected?

I answer, if it ever reach us, it must spring up among us. It cannot come from abroad. If destruction be our lot, we ourselves, must be its author and its finisher. As a nation of free men, we must live through all time or die by suicide. Surely God would not have created such a being as man, with an ability to grasp the infinite to exist only for a day. No, no. Man was made for immortality."

After Lincoln's speech, the show concluded with a rendition of "The Battle Hymn of the Republic," the same rendition used in Great Moments with Mr. Lincoln.

This version of the show remained virtually unchanged from 1971 until 1993. Additional Audio-Animatronic figures of Gerald R. Ford, Jimmy Carter, Ronald Reagan, and George H. W. Bush were added when each entered office. Lawrence Dobkin continued to be the narrator, and re-recorded the roll call for each new addition.

=== Clinton administration (1993–2001) ===
The show closed in early September 1993 and was then completely renovated and re-opened in October 1993, after Bill Clinton had been elected to office. The changes to the show, which in some form remained until early 2017, are credited to Eric Foner, a history professor at Columbia University. He persuaded various Disney executives, most notably then-Disney CEO Michael Eisner, that a new adaptation of the show was needed. Foner is responsible for completely rewriting and changing the script of the show in order to focus more on slavery and other ethical and civil related issues in the United States of America. He is also responsible for rewriting Lincoln's speech, which was originally nearly identical to that which Lincoln gave in the original version of Great Moments with Mr. Lincoln. Clinton also became the first president to provide his voice to recite a speech for his audio-animatronic figure; every president after him has followed the same as they have entered office, with the exception of Joe Biden, who did not record remarks. Every president since Barack Obama has also provided their voice to recite the presidential oath of office.

While the format of the show remained in the sense of the photos, films, and other features used in the film and elsewhere in the presentation, the speed at which the films played, and what was shown on them was redone to fit the changed script. A new music score was also introduced.

Also, prominent members of The Walt Disney Company would no longer narrate parts of the film. Instead, Maya Angelou narrated the revised script and gave the roll-call of the presidents. New amateur actors gave the voices of the characters in the film. Another feature that was added in 1993 was a speech given by the incumbent president. Foner is responsible for writing the speech which President Clinton himself recorded at the White House. Followed by the incumbent president's speech, Abraham Lincoln would give the completely revised speech written by Foner. The Lincoln Audio-Animatronic figure was also given eyeglasses, and held a piece of paper to glance to and from his speech. Some objected to this, saying that it dumbed down the depiction of Lincoln as a prominent and iconic figure. During the 1993 refurbishment of the attraction, Royal Dano, who was the original voice of Lincoln for The Hall of Presidents and Great Moments with Mr. Lincoln at the World's Fair and early versions of the attraction at Disneyland, had become ill and was not able to record Lincoln's revised speech. Instead, voice actor Peter Renaday was tasked to voice Abraham Lincoln. Renaday also served as a narrator on The Walt Disney Story version of Great Moments with Mr. Lincoln and provided the narration for the Magic Kingdom's Tomorrowland Transit Authority PeopleMover from 1994 to 2009.

=== Bush administration (2001–2009) ===
For the 2001 update to the show, adding President George W. Bush and his speech, actor J. D. Hall replaced Angelou as the narrator, but he read from the same script as the 1993 version. The Audio-Animatronic figure created for President Bill Clinton in 1993 was recycled and used for President George W. Bush.

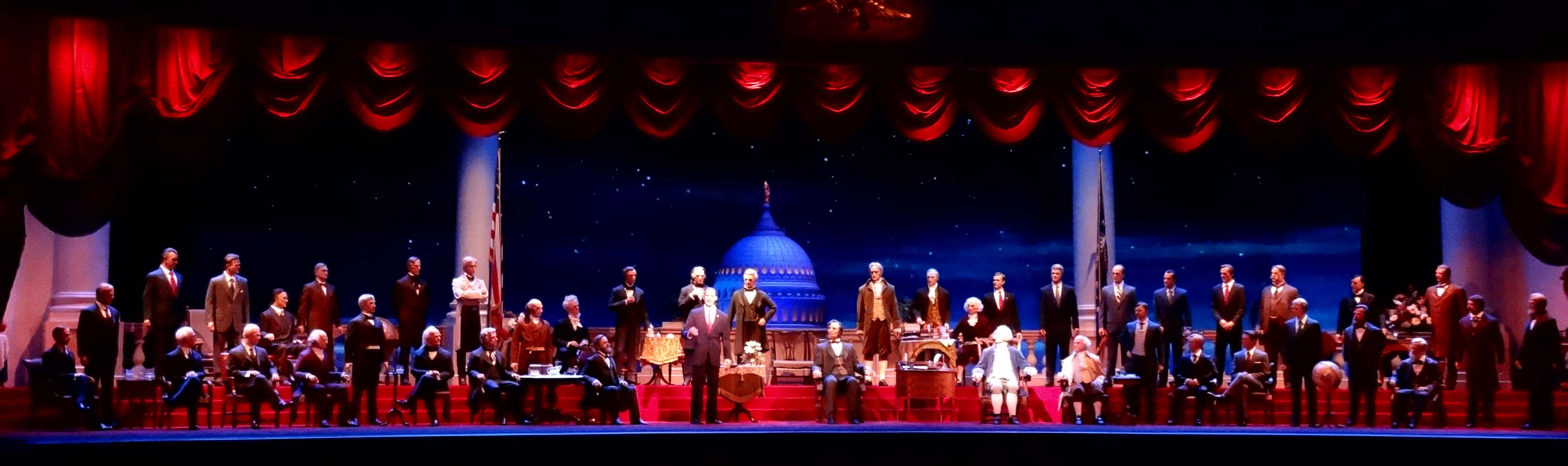
The 2009–17 version of The Hall of Presidents (pictured in June 2011), featuring a speech by Barack Obama

=== Obama administration (2009–2017) ===
Walt Disney Imagineering visited the White House on March 9, 2009 to record President Obama's speech for the attraction, in a video released by the White House.

The Hall of Presidents closed October 31, 2008, prior to the general elections, to undergo an extensive renovation to upgrade its audio and visual effects and systems as well as the addition of the next president, while the attraction was renamed The Hall of Presidents: A Celebration of Liberty’s Leaders. After the election and inauguration of President Barack Obama, Walt Disney Imagineering was invited to the White House Map Room on March 4, 2009 to record his speech for the attraction and as well as to recite once again the oath of office of the president of the United States. Imagineering also recorded Obama's facial expressions and body movement to serve as reference for the creation and animation of the audio-animatronic. According to Pam Fisher, senior show writer for Imagineering, "it is quite an experience to arrive in the White House and actually be present when the president records his speech for the Hall of Presidents." The Obama version of the attraction opened on July 4, 2009, on the 233rd anniversary of the independence of the United States. After Blaine Gibson's retirement, his apprentice, Valerie Edwards, sculpted Obama's audio-animatronic. Morgan Freeman replaced Hall as narrator for the 2009 revised show, Royal Dano's performance as Abraham Lincoln was restored, and George Washington was added as a third speaking president. The clip of the Saturn V launch was replaced with footage showing the first launch of the Space Shuttle Columbia. This footage had been recycled from the original version of Universe of Energy at Epcot.

=== First Trump administration (2017–2021) ===
The attraction closed on January 17, 2017, for refurbishment and the addition of an audio-animatronic figure of President Donald Trump; it reopened on December 19, 2017, after many delays.

There was an unconfirmed rumor that because Disney predicted that Hillary Clinton would win the 2016 United States presidential election, Disney Imagineers had initially begun work on an Audio-Animatronic of Clinton which had to be modified to resemble Trump after his victory. According to Business Insider, an anonymous source who previously worked at Disney said "I think the reason he looks so awful is because the Imagineers made a mold with generic head shapes so they wouldn't have to make a whole new mold each time".

A new film, The Idea of a President, was shown, depicting a historical account of several American presidencies, notably George Washington, Andrew Jackson, Abraham Lincoln, Theodore Roosevelt, Franklin D. Roosevelt and John F. Kennedy. After the roll call of all past presidents, Washington gives a short speech, followed by Trump reciting the oath of office and a short speech.

=== Biden administration (2021–2025) ===
On January 19, 2021, it was announced that the Hall of Presidents had closed for refurbishment, with many media outlets pointing to the addition of President Joe Biden to the attraction. On July 19, 2021, Disney announced that Biden would be added to the Hall of Presidents, which reopened on August 3, 2021. The film The Idea of a President, which precedes the roll call of the presidents, was kept for the Biden incarnation. Biden provides his own voice to recite the oath of office following George Washington's speech; however, unlike past versions, Biden delivers no follow-up speech or remarks.

=== Second Trump administration (2025–present) ===
The attraction closed for refurbishment on January 20, 2025, following the second inauguration of Donald Trump, and reopened on June 29 of the same year. Unlike with previous revisions, due to the increasingly polarizing political climate that had been forming since its last overhaul with Biden, the updates were made quietly without any press releases or social media posts highlighting the changes. The second Trump incarnation of the attraction is virtually a complete reinstatement of the first, including the film The Idea of a President, which originally premiered with the first Trump incarnation and was used during the Biden incarnation. This version was the first to feature a previous president returning to center stage. The attraction reutilizes the original 2017 recording of Trump reciting the presidential oath, however the short speech that originally followed the oath was excised, akin to the previous Biden version; the roll call skips from Obama to Biden.

== Production ==
=== Cast ===
Role	1971–1993	1993–2001	2001–2009	2009–2017	2017–2021	2021–2025	2025–present
Narrator	Lawrence Dobkin	Maya Angelou	J. D. Hall	Morgan Freeman	Joy Vandervort-Cobb	Joy Vandervort-Cobb	Joy Vandervort-Cobb
George Washington	Paul Frees	—	—	David Morse	David Morse	David Morse	David Morse
John Adams	Lawrence Dobkin	—	—	—	—	—	—
Thomas Jefferson	Paul Frees	—	—	—	—	—	—
Andrew Jackson	Dallas McKennon	—	—	—	—	—	—
Martin Van Buren	Paul Frees	—	—	—	—	—	—
Abraham Lincoln	Royal Dano	Peter Renaday	Peter Renaday	Royal Dano (Note: Archival recording.)	J. V. Martin	J. V. Martin	J. V. Martin
Incumbent President	-	Bill Clinton	George W. Bush	Barack Obama	Donald Trump	Joe Biden	Donald Trump

=== Transcripts ===
Bill Clinton, George W. Bush, Barack Obama, and Donald Trump (first term only) recorded their own remarks for The Hall of Presidents.

== In popular culture ==
The Hall of Presidents is briefly parodied in the segment "FLOTUS, FLOTUS, What Do You Know About Us?" of Season 1 Episode 13 of the 2020 reboot of Animaniacs, where Dot Warner attempts to sing about the First Ladies of the United States, from Martha Washington to Melania Trump, and their accomplishments in under two minutes.

The attraction is also one of various featured in the Disney+ docu-series Behind the Attraction, produced by Dwayne Johnson. The episode dedicated to the attraction was released on August 25, 2021.

== See also ==
- List of Magic Kingdom attractions
- The American Adventure
