= Villains Land =

Upcoming Disney theme park

- Interactive map of Villains Land
- Coordinates: 28°25′19″N 81°35′4″W
- Theme: Disney Villains

Magic Kingdom
- Status: Under construction
- Replaced: Tom Sawyer Island; Rivers of America; Liberty Belle riverboat

Villains Land is an upcoming theme park land located in Magic Kingdom at Walt Disney World in Lake Buena Vista, Florida. Themed after the Disney Villains, the land will feature a roller coaster themed to Maleficent and a dark ride featuring Cruella de Vil, Dr. Facilier, Scar, and the Magic Mirror.

== History ==
In August 2024, it was announced that a seventh themed land focused on the Disney Villains will be built at the Magic Kingdom, at Walt Disney World. The land is described as the home of the Disney Villains from Walt Disney Animation Studios films. In November 2024 at D23 Brazil, it was announced that the land will be feature the Queen of Hearts, Jafar, the Evil Queen (and her witch form), Lady Tremaine, Yzma, Cruella de Vil, Captain Hook, Maleficent (and her dragon form), Gaston, Mother Gothel, Ursula, Hades, and Chernabog, and the backstory for the land was revealed. In August 2025 at Destination D23, it was announced that the land will feature conjuring architecture inspiration.

At the D23 fan event in August 2026, the land's name was announced as well as two attractions; a Maleficent roller coaster and Magic Mirror dark ride.

== Future attractions ==
- Unnamed Maleficent attraction
- Unnamed Magic Mirror attraction
- Walt Disney World Railroad
  - Villains Land Station
