= Magic Kingdom =

Theme park at Walt Disney World

Magic Kingdom Park

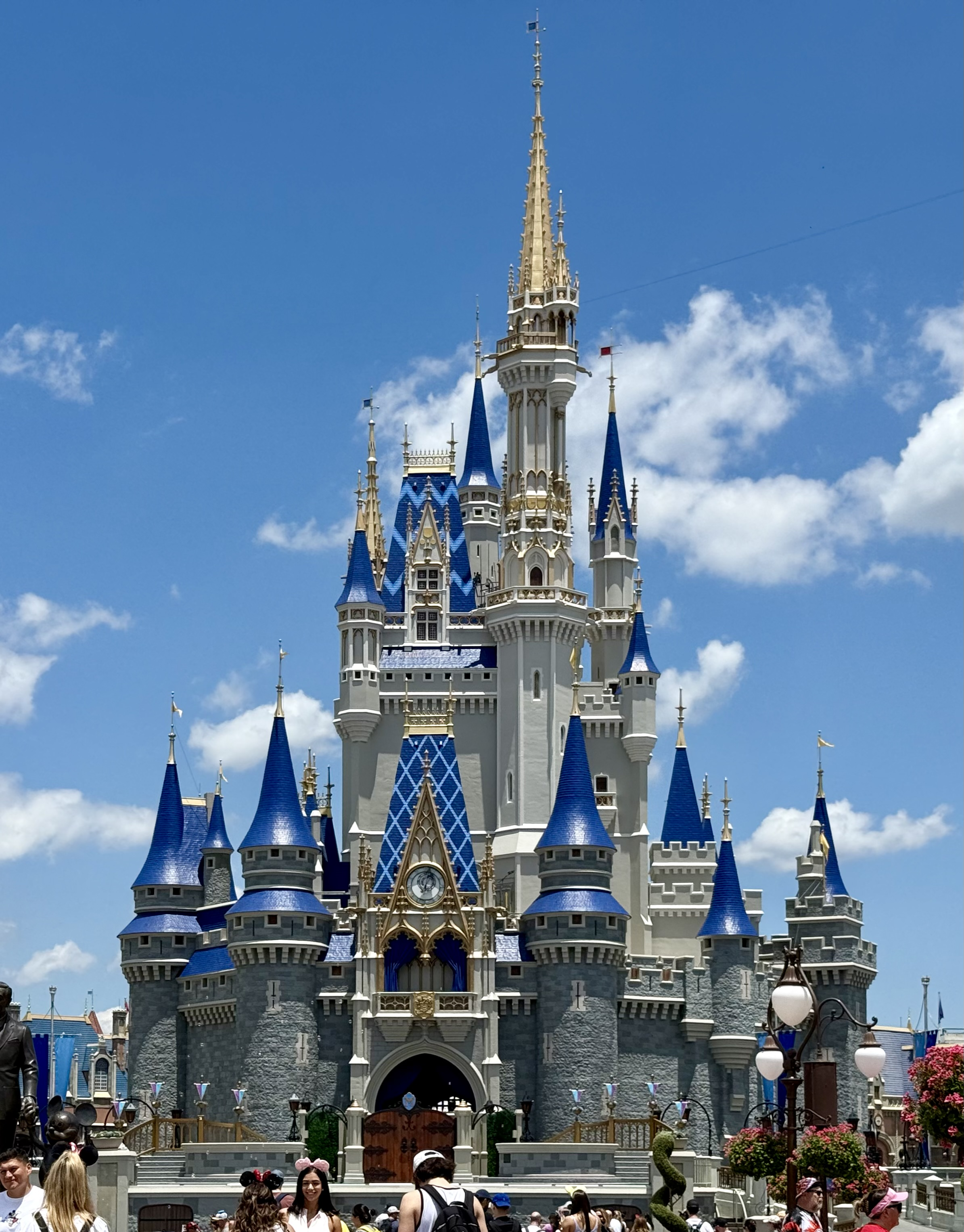
- Cinderella Castle, the icon of Magic Kingdom
- Interactive map of Magic Kingdom Park
- Location: Walt Disney World, Bay Lake, Florida, United States
- Coordinates: 28°25′07″N 81°34′52″W
- Status: Operating
- Opened: October 1, 1971 (55 years ago)
- Owner: Disney Experiences (The Walt Disney Company)
- Operated by: Walt Disney World; Key people: Sarah Riles (VP); Perry Crawley (GM, Operations)
- Theme: Americana, Disney characters and fairy tales
- Slogan: The Most Magical Place On Earth
- Operating season: Year-round
- Website: Magic Kingdom
Preceding station	Walt Disney World Monorail System	Following station
Disney's Grand Floridian Resort & Spa One-way operation	Resort Line	Disney's Contemporary Resort Next clockwise
Transportation and Ticket Center Next counter-clockwise	Express Line	Transportation and Ticket Center One-way operation

Magic Kingdom Park, or simply Magic Kingdom, is a theme park at Walt Disney World Resort in Bay Lake, Florida, near Orlando. It opened on October 1, 1971, and is owned and operated by the Walt Disney Company through its Experiences division. The park was initiated by Walt Disney and designed by WED Enterprises, modeled after Disneyland in Anaheim, California.

The park icon is Cinderella Castle, inspired by the fairy-tale castle featured in the 1950 animated film. In 2025, the park hosted 17.8 million visitors, making it the most visited theme park in the world for the nineteenth consecutive year and the most visited theme park in North America for at least the past 25 years. The park has become a cultural touchstone and symbol of American pop culture.

== History ==
=== Conception ===
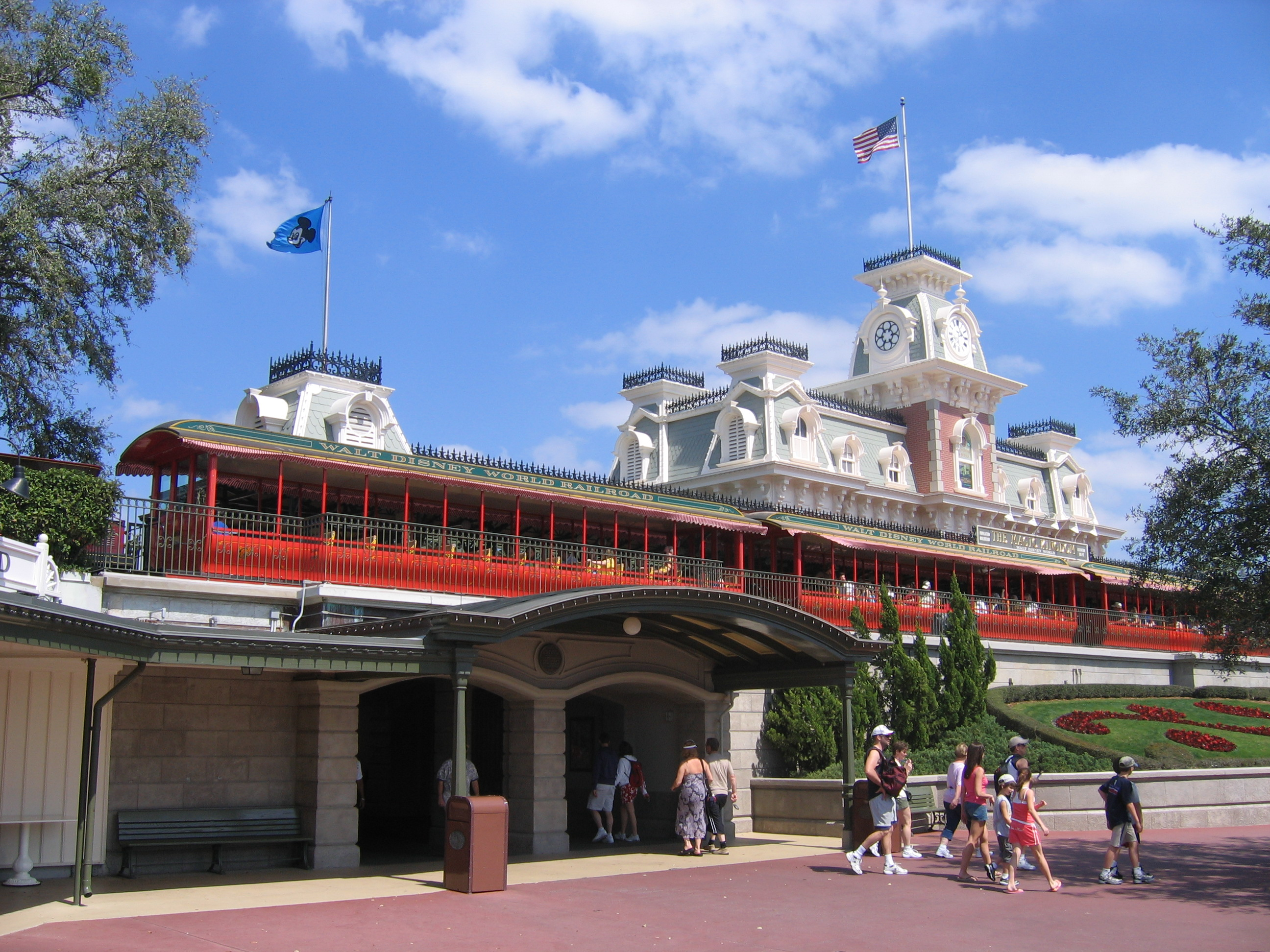
Magic Kingdom entrance

Walt Disney was highly involved in planning the Walt Disney World resort complex and park, coming to Florida in person to survey the land, meeting with local officials and announcing the project to the media but not being able to see the project completed due to his death in 1966. After Walt's death, his brother Roy Disney took over the project. Walt Disney Productions began construction on Magic Kingdom and the entire resort in 1967. The park was built as a larger version of Disneyland in California.

Magic Kingdom was built over a series of tunnels called utilidors, a portmanteau of utility and corridor, allowing employees (called "cast members") or VIP guests to move through the park out of sight.

Because of Florida's high water table, the tunnels could not be put underground, so they were built at the existing grade, meaning the park is built on the second story, giving Magic Kingdom an elevation of 108 feet (33 m). The area around the utilidor was filled in with dirt removed from Seven Seas Lagoon, which was being constructed at the same time. The utilidors were built in the initial construction and were not extended as the park expanded. The tunnels were intended to be designed into all subsequent Walt Disney World parks but were set aside mostly because of financial constraints.

=== Opening and operation ===
Dedication

Walt Disney World is a tribute to the philosophy and life of Walter Elias Disney... and to the talents, the dedication, and the loyalty of the entire Disney organization that made Walt Disney's dream come true. May Walt Disney World bring Joy and Inspiration and New Knowledge to all who come to this happy place ... a Magic Kingdom where the young at heart of all ages can laugh and play and learn together.

— Roy O. Disney, October 25, 1971

Magic Kingdom opened as the first part of the Walt Disney World Resort on October 1, 1971, commencing concurrently with Disney's Contemporary Resort and Disney's Polynesian Village Resort. Admission prices were $3.50 for adults, $2.50 for juniors under age 18, and $1 for children under twelve. Rides were charged for individually, using a graduated price ticketing system; tickets could be purchased individually or in books.

Magic Kingdom opened with twenty-three attractions, three unique to the park and twenty replicas of attractions at Disneyland, split into six themed lands; five copies of those at Disneyland (Main Street, U.S.A., Adventureland, Frontierland, Fantasyland, and Tomorrowland), and Liberty Square, exclusive to Magic Kingdom (rather than the New Orleans Square at Disneyland). While there is no individual dedication to Magic Kingdom, the dedication by Roy O. Disney for the entire resort was placed within its gates.

The only land added to the original roster of lands in the park was Mickey's Toontown Fair. The land originally opened in 1988 as Mickey's Birthdayland to celebrate Mickey Mouse's 60th birthday. Later the land was renovated as Mickey's Starland, then Mickey's Toyland, and eventually to Mickey's Toontown Fair in the summer of 1996. The land was home to attractions such as Mickey's Country House, Minnie's Country House, The Barnstormer at Goofy's Wiseacre Farm, and Donald's Boat.

Mickey's Toontown Fair closed on February 11, 2011, as part of a major expansion of Fantasyland (dubbed New Fantasyland). The Walt Disney World Railroad station in Mickey's Toontown Fair, which opened with Mickey's Birthdayland in 1988, was closed for the duration of the construction. The space reopened in March 2012 as Storybook Circus, a subsection of Fantasyland, where an updated Dumbo the Flying Elephant attraction was relocated and a rethemed Barnstormer attraction reopened. The New Fantasyland project was completed on May 28, 2014, with the opening of the Seven Dwarfs Mine Train attraction.

Early in 2024, a Disney executive confirmed that the park will expand with the addition of a 12-to-14-acre (4.9 to 5.7 ha) land located "beyond Big Thunder." In August 2024, it was announced that the park will receive two attractions inspired by Pixar's Cars franchise in a redeveloped section of Frontierland, with construction scheduled to start in 2025. In addition, it was announced that the park will receive a land themed to Disney Villains. On July 6, 2025, the park's Rivers of America section of Frontierland—including Tom Sawyer Island and the Liberty Belle Riverboat—permanently closed to guests to make way for construction.

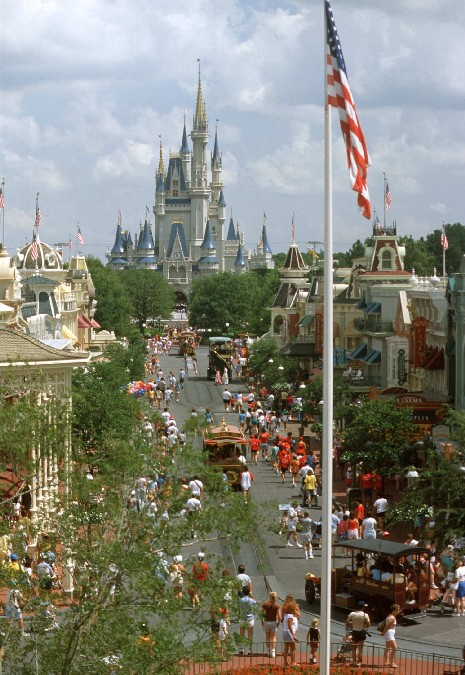
Main Street, U.S.A., with Cinderella Castle in the far distance, pre-2000

Since opening day, Magic Kingdom has been closed temporarily because of nine hurricanes: Floyd, Charley, Frances, Jeanne, Wilma, Matthew, Irma, Ian, and Milton. The first non-hurricane related day the park has closed is on September 11, 2001, due to the terrorist attacks that day. Magic Kingdom and the remainder of the Walt Disney World Resort was closed from March 15, 2020, to July 11, 2020, due to the COVID-19 pandemic. In addition, there are four "phases" of park closure when Magic Kingdom exceeds capacity, ranging from restricted access for most guests (Phase 1) to full closure for everyone, even cast-members (Phase 4).

"Magic Kingdom" was often used as an unofficial nickname for Disneyland before Walt Disney World was built. The official tagline for Disneyland is "The Happiest Place On Earth", while the tagline for Magic Kingdom is "The Most Magical Place On Earth". Until the early 1990s, Magic Kingdom was officially known as Walt Disney World Magic Kingdom, and was never printed without the Walt Disney World prefix. This purpose was to differentiate between the park and Disneyland in California. In 1994, to differentiate it from Disneyland, the park was officially renamed Magic Kingdom Park.

Alcoholic beverages had been prohibited from the park since its opening, but this policy has gradually changed. In 2012, Be Our Guest Restaurant opened selling wine and beer for the first time. This was the only place in the park where alcohol was permitted until December 2014 when four additional restaurants began selling beer and wine including Cinderella's Royal Table, Liberty Tree Tavern, Tony's Town Square Restaurant, and Jungle Navigation Co. Ltd. Skipper Canteen. The park officially became the second Magic Kingdom-style park to serve alcohol at all table service restaurants in 2018, after Disneyland Paris in 1993.

== Park layout and attractions ==
Magic Kingdom layout Main Street, U.S.A. Adventureland Liberty Square Frontierland Fantasyland Tomorrowland

Magic Kingdom is divided into six themed "lands." The center of the park in front of Cinderella Castle is designed like a wheel with a hub and spoke design. Pathways spoke out from the hub across the 107 acres (43 ha) of the park and lead to these six lands. The Walt Disney World Railroad circles around the 1.5-mile (2.4 km) perimeter of the park.

=== Main Street, U.S.A. ===
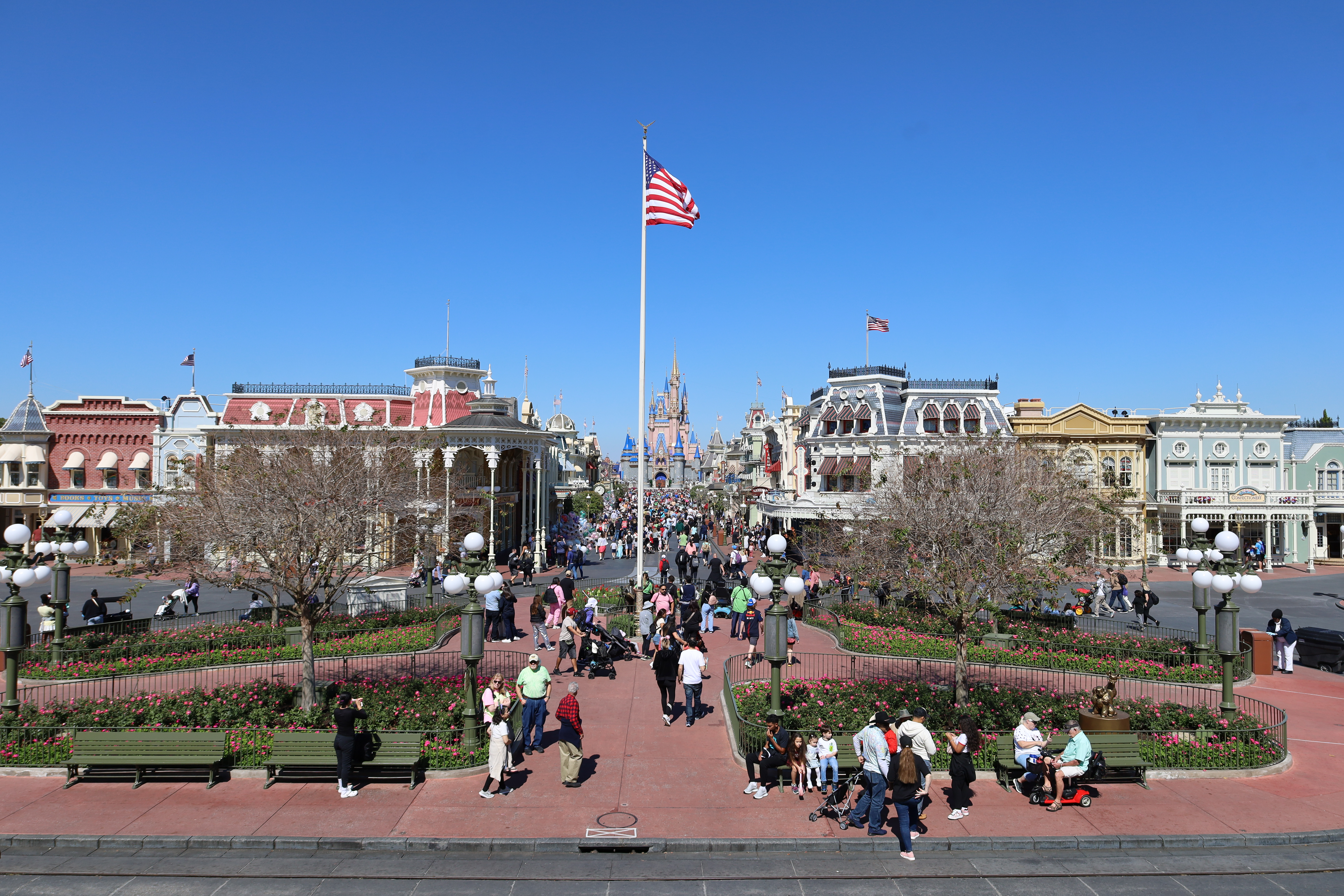
Main Street, U.S.A., as viewed from the Walt Disney World Railroad station in 2024

Main Street, U.S.A. is modeled after an idealized early-20th century American town, inspired by Walt Disney's hometown of Marceline, Missouri. Main Street features a train station, town square, movie theater, city hall, firehouse, restaurants, emporium, shops, arcades, and several varieties of horse-drawn and motor-powered vehicles. Guests enter the park underneath the main station of the Walt Disney World Railroad and into the town square. At the far end of Main Street is the park's hub, anchored by Cinderella Castle and the Partners statue.

Symbolically, Main Street represents the park's "opening credits", where guests pass under the train station (the opening curtain) at left or right, then view the names of key personnel along the windows of the buildings' upper floors. Many windows bear the name of a fictional business, such as "Seven Summits Expeditions, Frank G. Wells President", with each representing a tribute to significant people connected to the Disney company and the development of the Walt Disney World Resort. It features stylistic influences from around the country. Taking its inspiration from New England to Missouri, this design is most noticeable in the four corners in the middle of Main Street, where each of the four corner buildings represents a different architectural style. The second and third stories of all the buildings along Main Street are designed with forced perspective, and are actually shorter than the first stories. The musical soundtrack played at the entrance includes musical selections from the 1943 Broadway musical Oklahoma! and the 1957 Broadway musical The Music Man. The Dapper Dans, a men's a cappella singing group, typically perform throughout Main Street.

=== Adventureland ===
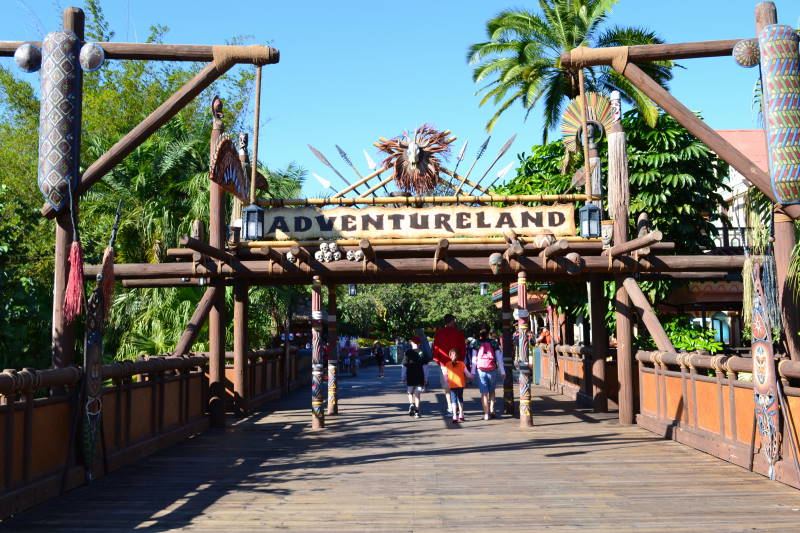
The main entrance to Adventureland from Main Street, U.S.A.

Adventureland represents the mystery of exploring exotic lands and features several attractions themed to resemble the remote landscapes of Africa, Asia, the Middle East, South America, the Caribbean, and the South Pacific. Jungle Cruise is a comedic riverboat cruise attraction that travels along wild waterways from around the world. Pirates of the Caribbean is a dark ride depicting the exploits and plundering of a pirate siege on a Caribbean island town featuring several characters from the subsequent eponymous film series. Walt Disney's Enchanted Tiki Room is a Polynesian musical Audio-Animatronic show drawing from American tiki culture in the Sunshine pavilion. Swiss Family Treehouse is an interactive walk-through treehouse attraction based on the 1960 film, Swiss Family Robinson. The Magic Carpets of Aladdin is an aerial carousel-style ride based on Disney Animation's 1992 film, Aladdin.

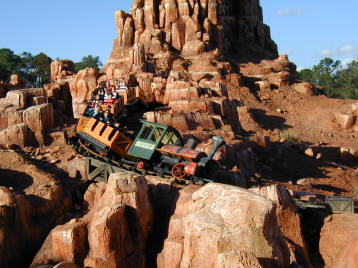
Big Thunder Mountain Railroad

=== Frontierland ===
Frontierland is a romanticized portrayal of the American frontier, including cowboys, Native Americans and Western saloons. Big Thunder Mountain Railroad is a mine train roller coaster featuring a runaway mine train through mine shafts and canyons of the American Southwest. Tiana's Bayou Adventure is a log flume ride inspired by Disney Animation's 2009 film, The Princess and the Frog. Other attractions include the Country Bear Musical Jamboree.

=== Liberty Square ===
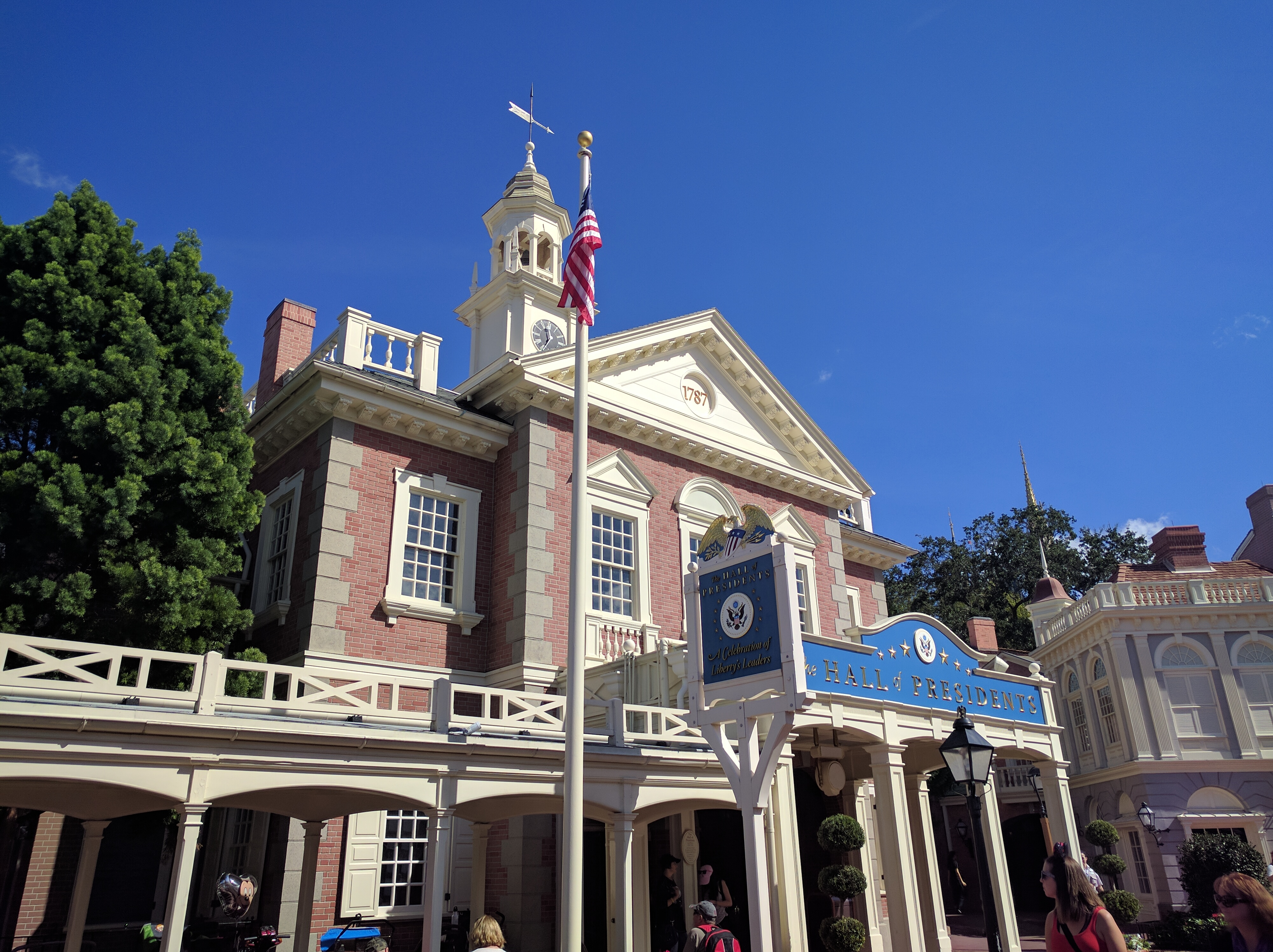
The entrance to The Hall of Presidents

Liberty Square is inspired by a colonial American town set during the American Revolutionary War. The land contains recreations and replicas of real historical sites found in Philadelphia and Boston such as Independence Hall, the Liberty Tree, and the Liberty Bell. The Hall of Presidents is a film presentation and stage show themed to the American presidency and featuring Audio-Animatronics figures of all 45 individual American presidents. Tucked away in a corner of Liberty Square is The Haunted Mansion, a dark ride omnimover attraction themed to a haunted New England manor.

=== Fantasyland ===
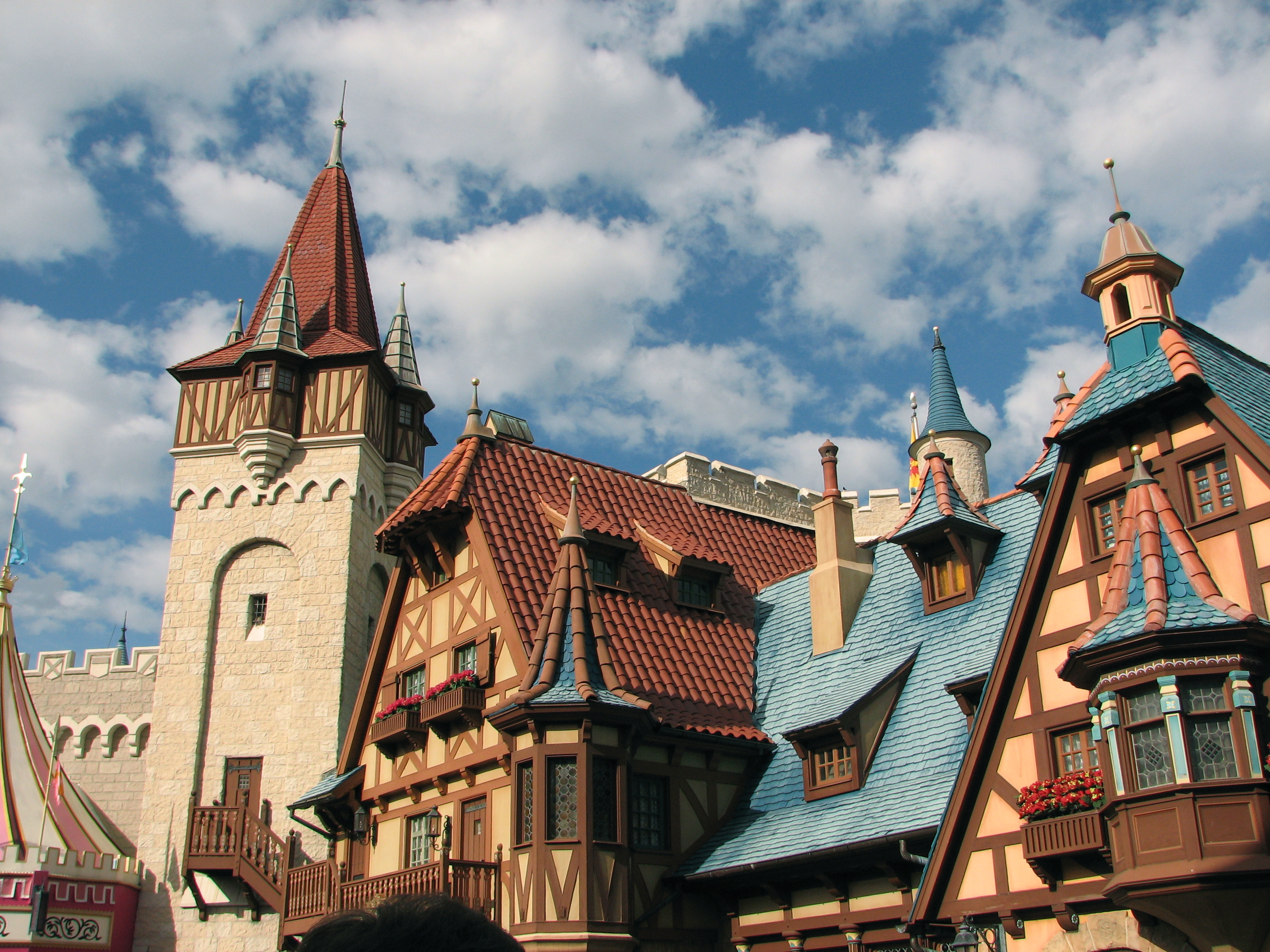
Buildings located in the Fantasyland Forest section of Fantasyland. Note the Bavarian-style architecture.

Fantasyland is themed to Disney's animated fairy tale feature films. Depicted in a medieval-faire style, Fantasyland features multiple attractions featuring various Disney characters and stories, including Peter Pan's Flight, It's a Small World, Mickey's PhilharMagic in Fantasyland Theatre, Mad Tea Party, The Many Adventures of Winnie the Pooh, and Prince Charming Regal Carrousel.

Outside of the castle courtyard is Fantasyland Forest, featuring attractions based on other Disney princesses and heroines: Seven Dwarfs Mine Train, is a mine cart roller coaster based on Snow White and the Seven Dwarfs; The Little Mermaid: Ariel's Undersea Adventure is a dark ride omnimover attraction based on The Little Mermaid; Be Our Guest Restaurant is a themed restaurant with character dining themed to Beast's castle from Disney Animation's 1991 film Beauty and the Beast; Enchanted Tales with Belle, and Ariel's Grotto.

==== Storybook Circus ====
Storybook Circus is a subsection of Fantasyland, themed to a traveling circus stopped along a railroad route just outside of Fantasyland Forest. The land's marquee attractions include Dumbo the Flying Elephant, an aerial carousel-style ride based on the 1941 film Dumbo; The Barnstormer, a family roller coaster featuring Goofy as a daredevil stuntman; and Casey Jr. Splash 'n' Soak Station. Pete's Silly Sideshow is a character meet-and-greet featuring Goofy as a stuntman, Daisy Duck as a fortune-teller, Donald Duck as a snake-charmer, Minnie Mouse as a magician, and Pluto as a special performer.

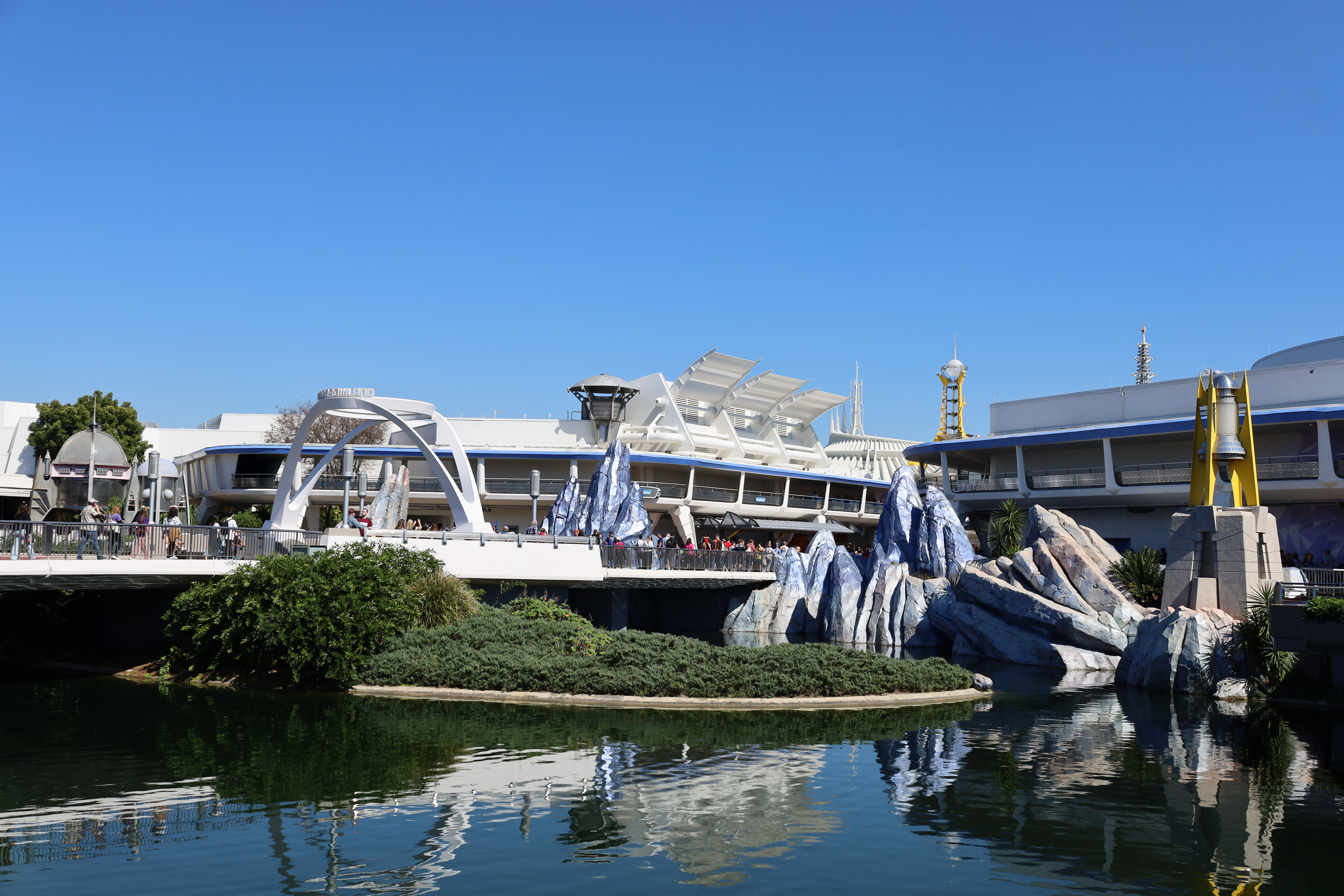
Tomorrowland, as seen from the Cinderella Castle fireworks viewing area

=== Tomorrowland ===
Tomorrowland is themed to the concept of the future inspired by the optimism and scientific advancements of the Space Age and Atomic Age. Several attractions include Astro Orbiter, Buzz Lightyear's Space Ranger Spin, Monsters, Inc. Laugh Floor, Tomorrowland Speedway, the PeopleMover, and Walt Disney's Carousel of Progress. A pair of thrill ride roller coasters are located on the western edge of Tomorrowland: Space Mountain, themed to space exploration; and TRON Lightcycle / Run, based on the digital software world of the Grid from Tron.

=== Villains Land ===
Villains Land is upcoming land starring the classic Disney Villains

== Transportation and Ticket Center ==
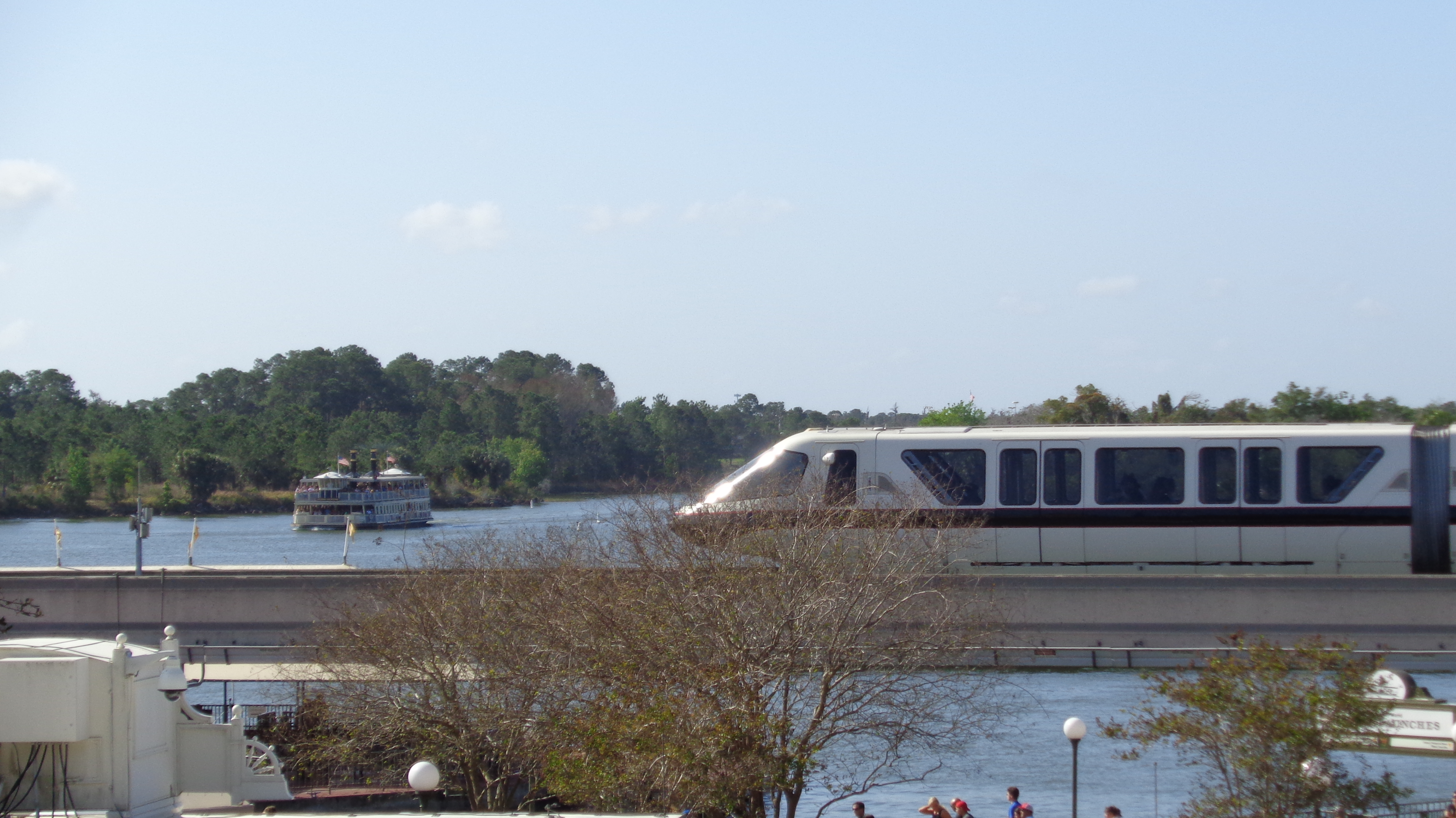
The resort's monorail system and ferryboats transport guests to and from Magic Kingdom.

Magic Kingdom lies more than a mile away from its parking lot, on the opposite side of the man-made Seven Seas Lagoon; this was a deliberate choice by Imagineers who wanted to visually separate the "backstage" parking lot from the park itself. Upon arrival, guests are taken by parking lot trams to the Transportation and Ticket Center (TTC), which sells admission into the parks and provides transportation connections throughout the resort complex. Guests using city buses, non-Disney hotel shuttles, or ridesharing services are also dropped off at the TTC.

To travel between the TTC and Magic Kingdom, guests have their choice of taking a ferry boat or the Walt Disney World Monorail System. The three ferries are clad in different trim colors and are named for past Disney executives: the General Joe Potter (blue), the Richard F. Irvine (red) and the Admiral Joe Fowler (green). The main monorail loop has two tracks. The outer track is used by the Express Line with direct service between the TTC and Magic Kingdom, while the inner track is the Resort Line with additional stops at the Contemporary, Grand Floridian and Polynesian Village resorts. Epcot is also accessible from the TTC via a spur monorail line that was added upon that park's opening in 1982.

The hotels in the Magic Kingdom Resort Area are connected to the park by walking paths, ferry boats, or the Walt Disney World Monorail System. Disney-owned hotels in other resort areas have Disney Transport buses to Magic Kingdom, but these do not serve the TTC. Instead, they operate from three bus loops located directly adjacent to the park's main gate.

== Attendance ==
Year	Attendance	Rank	Ref.
2000	15,400,000	1st	
2001	14,700,000	1st	
2002	14,000,000	1st	
2003	14,040,000	1st	
2004	15,100,000	1st	
2005	16,100,000	1st	
2006	16,640,000	1st	
2007	17,060,000	1st	
2008	17,063,000	1st	
2009	17,233,000	1st	
2010	16,972,000	1st	
2011	17,142,000	1st	
2012	17,536,000	1st	
2013	18,588,000	1st	
2014	19,332,000	1st	
2015	20,492,000	1st	
2016	20,395,000	1st	
2017	20,450,000	1st	
2018	20,859,000	1st	
2019	20,963,000	1st	
2020	6,941,000	1st	
2021	12,691,000	1st	
2022	17,133,000	1st	
2023	17,720,000	1st	
2024	17,836,000	1st	
2025	17,800,000	1st	

== In popular culture ==
Magic Kingdom has appeared in various forms of media, including in novels, film, and in video games:

- Adventures in the Magic Kingdom, a 1990 video game for the Nintendo Entertainment System
- Down and Out in the Magic Kingdom, a 2003 science fiction novel by Cory Doctorow
- The Kingdom Keepers, a 2005 children's novel by Ridley Pearson
- Escape from Tomorrow, a 2013 horror film directed by Randy Moore
- The Florida Project, a 2017 drama film directed by Sean Baker

=== Television adaptation ===
In 2012, Jon Favreau announced he was planning a film called Magic Kingdom. The film was described as "Night at the Museum at Disneyland," meaning that the film would tell a story where all the characters at Disney come to life at night. Marc Abraham and Eric Newman of Strike Entertainment were scheduled to produce the film. Writer-producer Ronald D. Moore had previously written an original script for the project, which the studio eventually declined to use, stating that Favreau and a new screenwriter would develop a new script.

In 2021, it was announced as a new project, now developed as a television series for Disney+. Moore was brought back to develop the series which will see that the various lands in Magic Kingdom are actually gateways to alternate worlds, thus setting up a shared universe. The first in the series will be The Society of Explorers and Adventurers (SEA).

== See also ==
- Mickey's Not-So-Scary Halloween Party
- Mickey's Very Merry Christmas Party
- Rail transport in Walt Disney Parks and Resorts
- List of Magic Kingdom attractions
- List of Walt Disney World Resort attractions

Preceding station	Walt Disney World Monorail System	Following station
Disney's Grand Floridian Resort & Spa One-way operation	Resort Line	Disney's Contemporary Resort Next clockwise
Transportation and Ticket Center Next counter-clockwise	Express Line	Transportation and Ticket Center One-way operation
