= Mike Fink Keel Boats =

Former attraction at Disney theme parks

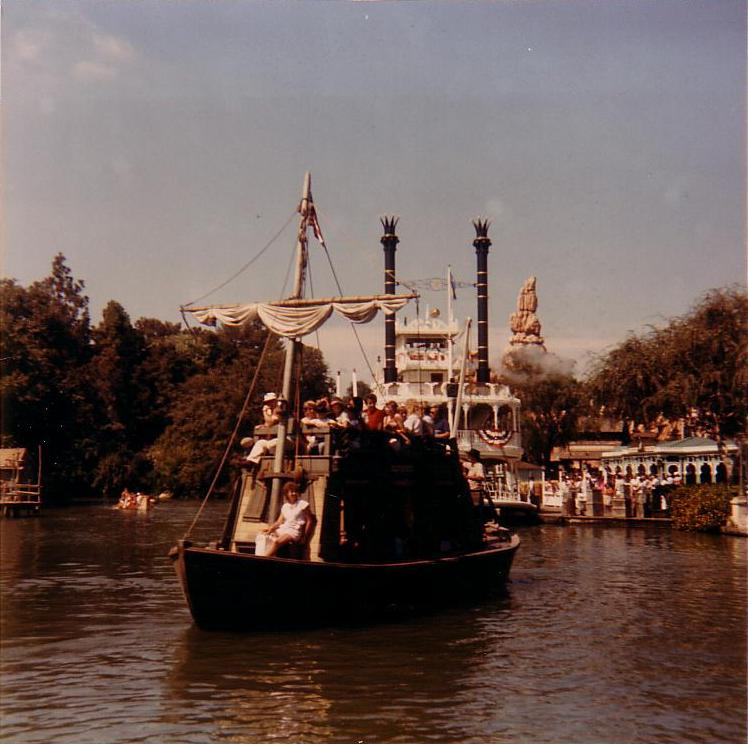
- Mike Fink Keel Boat in 1985

Disneyland
- Area: Frontierland
- Status: Removed
- Opening date: December 25, 1955
- Closing date: May 17, 1997

Magic Kingdom
- Area: Liberty Square
- Status: Removed
- Opening date: October 1, 1971
- Closing date: April 29, 2001
- Replaced by: Miss Fritter's Daredevil Spin-Along, Cars Ridge Run Rally & Villains Land

Disneyland Park (Paris)
- Area: Frontierland
- Status: Removed
- Opening date: April 12, 1992
- Closing date: Summer 2010

Ride statistics
- Vehicle names: Disneyland: Gullywhumper, Bertha Mae; Magic Kingdom: Gullywhumper, Bertha Mae; Disneyland Park (Paris): Raccoon, Coyote

Mike Fink Keel Boats (or River Rogue Keel Boats) were small boats that navigated the Rivers of America in Disneyland, the Magic Kingdom in Walt Disney World Resort, and Disneyland Park in Disneyland Paris.

== History ==
The Mike Fink Keel Boats were based on two episodes of the Davy Crockett miniseries which aired on the Disneyland TV show in 1955—"Davy Crockett's Keel Boat Race" (November 16) and "Davy Crockett and the River Pirates" (December 14). The ride was named after Mike Fink, the "King of the River" who lost the keel boat race. The two 38-foot boats, the Gullywhumper and the Bertha Mae, were the actual props that had been used in making the TV shows a few months earlier.

The boats were free-floating and traveled around Tom Sawyer Island. Riders would sit on benches either inside the cabin or on the roof of the cabin.

The keelboats at Disneyland closed at the end of the summer on September 6, 1994 and remained closed for nearly a year and a half until coming back in early March 1996. The Magic Kingdom's keel boats ran continuously until they closed in April 2001.

The Magic Kingdom location's dock was reused as an extended queue line for The Haunted Mansion.

== Closing ==
At about 5:30 p.m. on May 17, 1997, the Disneyland Gullywhumper boat began to rock side to side. It capsized, dumping a full boatload of passengers into the Rivers of America, leaving several with minor injuries. The boat was removed from the waters for inspection and neither the Gullywhumper nor the Bertha Mae returned for the next operating season. The Bertha Mae was put up on Disney's eBay auction site and was sold for $15,000 to Richard Kraft, and was later featured in a scene from Kraft's documentary Finding Kraftland. It was billed as an unseaworthy craft.

The Gullywhumper returned to Disneyland's Rivers of America as a prop and was moored on Tom Sawyer Island where passengers on the Davy Crockett's Explorer Canoes, the Sailing Ship Columbia, and the Mark Twain Riverboat could see it while passing. Eventually, hull damage caused the boat to flood and sink, and it was finally removed from public view in April 2009.

A former Mike Fink Keel Boat from the Magic Kingdom's version of the attraction previously sat as a non-functional prop on the banks of Tom Sawyer Island until the island's closure in 2025.

Regarding its status at Disneyland Paris, the attraction does not appear anymore on the Park Guides or Maps. After a short opening during the summer 2010, the attraction is currently closed and hidden from the view of visitors with "Danger: Bear Cave" signs surrounding it. The reasons for its closure or lack of operation are not clear, but some may suggest the following: small capacity (only two boats) generating great waiting lines, required extensive training to operating Cast Members (first aid, navigation procedures, etc.), and the extremely poor and dirty condition of the Rivers of the Farwest Lake make the Riverboats a non-suitable attraction for Disneyland Paris.

== See also ==
- List of former Disneyland attractions
- List of Magic Kingdom attractions
