= Davy Crockett's Explorer Canoes =

Attraction at Disney theme parks

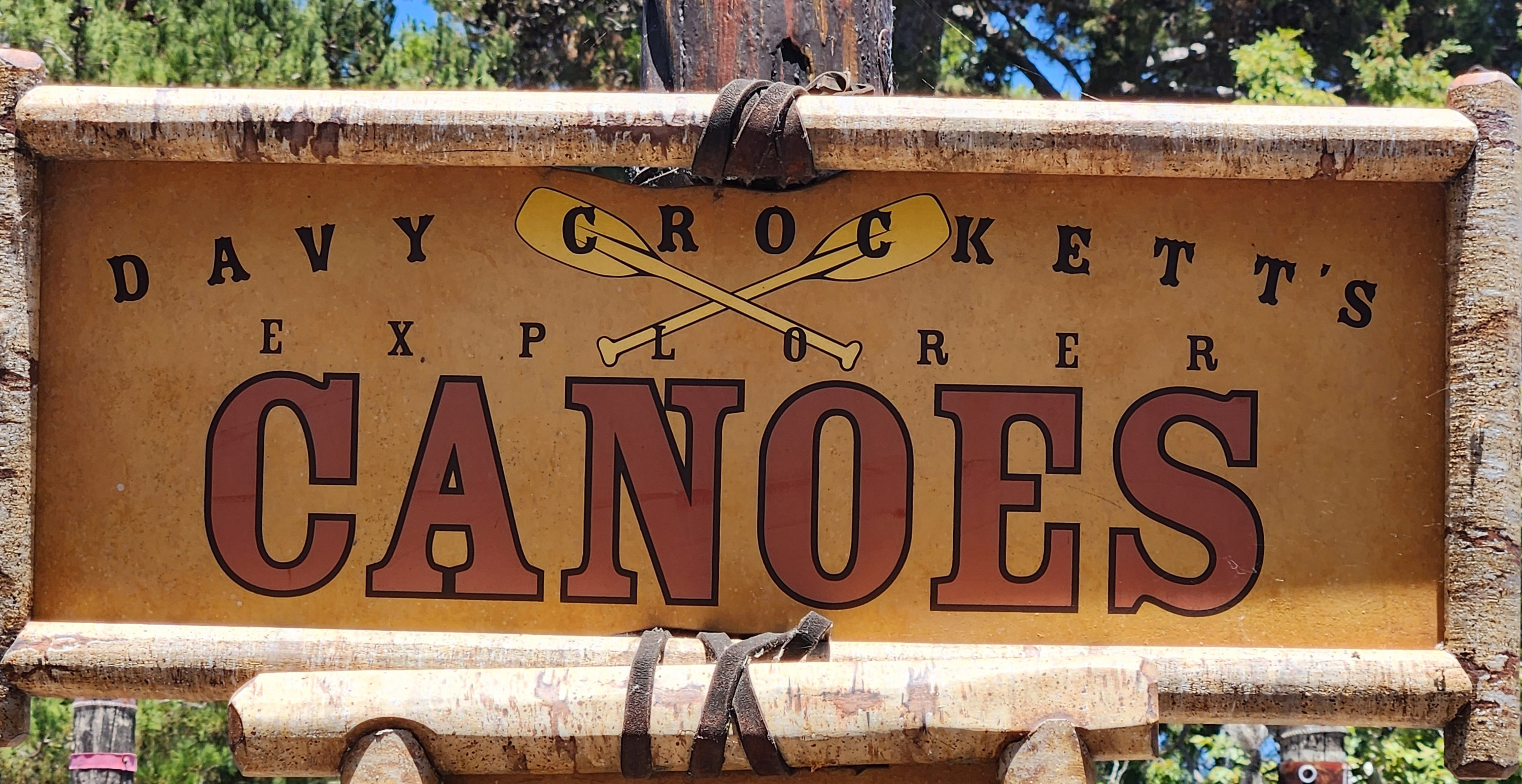

Disneyland
- Area: Frontierland (1956–1972); Bear Country (1972–1988); Critter Country (1988–2024); Bayou Country (2024–present)
- Status: Operating
- Opening date: July 4, 1956

Magic Kingdom
- Area: Frontierland
- Status: Closed
- Opening date: October 1, 1971
- Closing date: 1994

Tokyo Disneyland
- Name: Beaver Brothers Explorer Canoes
- Area: Critter Country
- Status: Operating
- Opening date: April 15, 1983

Disneyland Park (Paris)
- Area: Frontierland
- Status: Closed
- Opening date: April 12, 1992
- Closing date: 1994

Shanghai Disneyland
- Name: Explorer Canoes 探险家独木舟
- Area: Treasure Cove
- Status: Operating
- Soft opening date: May 7, 2016
- Opening date: June 16, 2016

Ride statistics
- Attraction type: Free-floating canoe
- Vehicle type: Canoe
- Must transfer from wheelchair

Davy Crockett's Explorer Canoes is a free-floating canoe experience at several Disney theme parks. The oldest of the rides is located at the Disneyland park in Anaheim, California. Boarding from the park's Bayou Country section, up to twenty visitors paddle a canoe around the Rivers of America, accompanied by two guides. This is the only Disneyland attraction that is powered by park visitors.

The attraction originally opened as Indian War Canoes on July 4, 1956 as part of Frontierland’s Indian Village expansion. It also operates under the name of Beaver Brother's Explorer Canoes at Tokyo Disneyland and operated at the Magic Kingdom in Walt Disney World and at Disneyland Park in Disneyland Paris. At Shanghai Disneyland, the ride is simply named Explorer Canoes.

== Ride Description ==
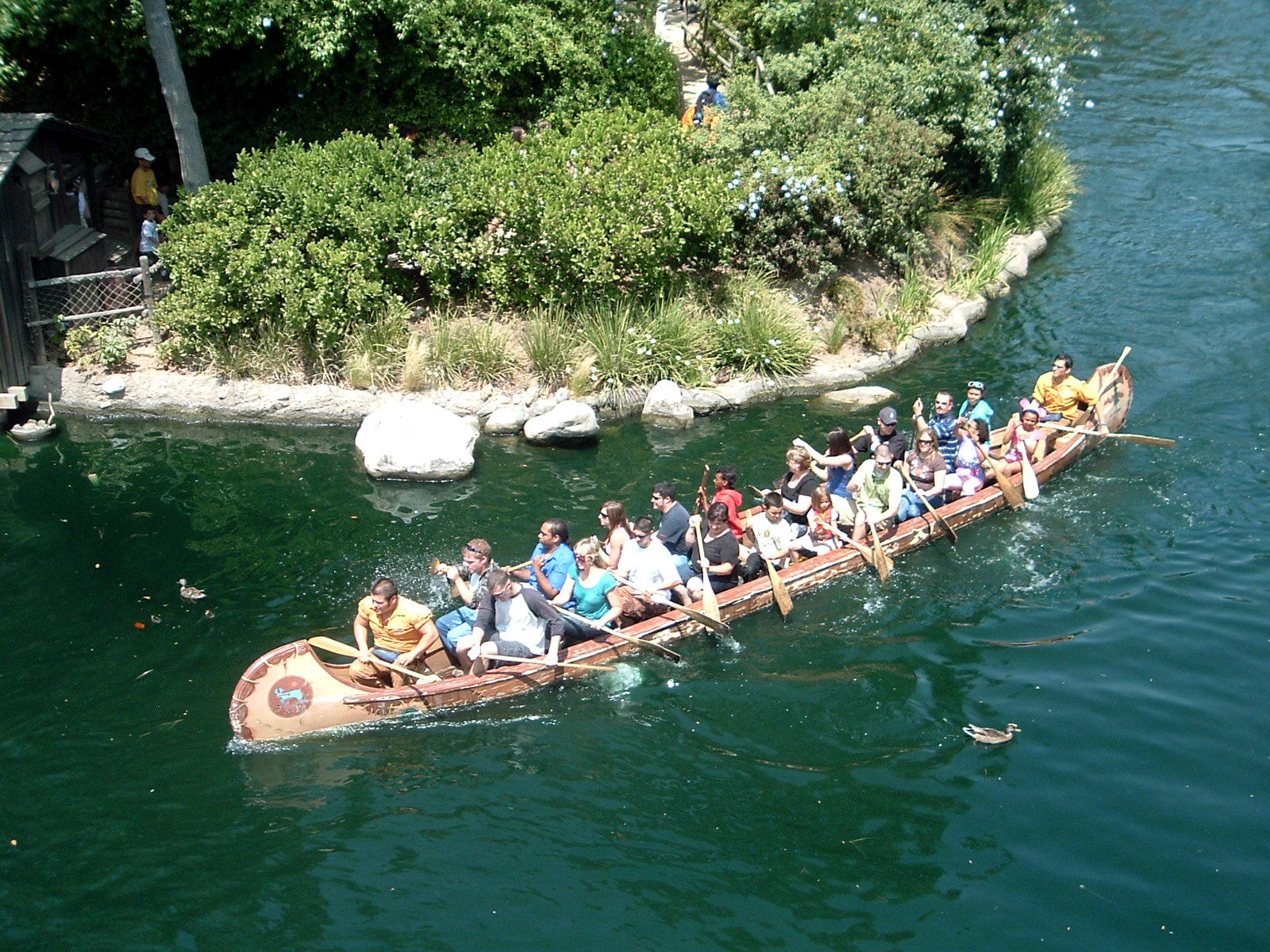
Canoe cruising around the Rivers of America

At the original Disneyland version of the attraction, riders embark and disembark from a small boat dock next to the Hungry Bear Barbecue Jamboree restaurant in the Bayou Country section of the park. Each 35-foot-long (11 m) fiberglass canoe holds twenty guests, two per row. Each canoe has two guides dressed as frontierspeople at the bow and stern. These guides are referred to as the helmsman, bowman, and sternman.

Riders/rowers are given a short lesson on how to paddle the canoe to power the boat properly after leaving the dock. Small children are required to wear life jackets. Life jackets are also available for adults who cannot swim in the event the boat ever capsizes. As the canoe travels 2,400 feet (730 m) around Tom Sawyer Island, located in the center of the man-made river, the guides point out the sights along the way, such as a settler's cabin and the Indian chief on horseback. The ride's length depends upon how fast the paddlers are and how much other traffic is on the river.

Lacking tracks or a predetermined path to follow, the average ride duration is much shorter than the large boats, like the Mark Twain Riverboat and the Sailing Ship Columbia which ride along submerged tracks and return by the last bend of Tiana's Bayou Adventure. The attraction operates year-round on weekends and includes weekdays during the park's peak seasons. The canoes generally close at dusk as to prepare the Rivers of America for any night water shows such as Fantasmic!.

== History ==
It is one of only two attractions in Disneyland to be in four different lands without ever being moved. Originally called Indian War Canoes, the attraction opened on July 4, 1956, as part of Frontierland's Indian Village expansion, with real American Indian guides aboard every canoe. Guests used a "D ticket" to ride the attraction. The Indian War Canoes closed with Indian Village in 1971 but reopened on May 19 as Davy Crockett’s Explorer Canoes, inspired by the Davy Crockett miniseries, with the guides now wearing coonskin caps.

In 1972 it became a part of Bear Country, home of Country Bear Jamboree (1972–2001). The area was later renamed Critter Country in 1988.

In addition to the Explorer Canoes, Disneyland and the Magic Kingdom's Liberty Square operated the Mike Fink Keel Boats until 1997. This attraction was based on the miniseries episode "Davy Crockett's Keelboat Race".

On January 11, 2016, the Davy Crockett Explorer Canoes, along with the other attractions and shows along the Rivers of America, temporarily closed for the construction of Star Wars: Galaxy's Edge. The attraction reopened on July 29, 2017.

In November 2024, Critter Country was renamed Bayou Country.

== Other parks ==
=== Magic Kingdom ===
Davy Crockett Explorer Canoes debuted in Frontierland on opening day at Magic Kingdom. A C ticket was required for guests to board the 35-foot (11 m) long canoes from a dock located to the north of the Tom Sawyer Island raft launch and travel along the same path as other watercraft on the Rivers of America. The attraction closed in 1994.

=== Tokyo Disneyland ===
A canoe attraction opened in Tokyo Disneyland under the name of Davey Crockett Explorer Canoes along the Rivers of America in the theme park's Westernland. It was renamed Beaver Brothers Explorer Canoes in 1992 with the opening of Critter Country.

=== Disneyland Park Paris ===
An Indian Canoes canoe ride opened with Euro Disneyland on April 12, 1992. It also closed in 1994.

=== Shanghai Disneyland ===
This attraction is known as Bilge Rat Bill's Explorer Canoes. Departing from Dead Man's Landing, the canoes travel through Treasure Cove's lagoon and Adventure Isle's Q'olari River.

== See also ==
- List of Disneyland attractions
- List of Tokyo Disneyland attractions
- List of Shanghai Disneyland Park attractions
