= List of Disneyland attractions =

Former Disneyland sign near the original entrance

Disneyland is a theme park, conceived by Walt Disney, within the Disneyland Resort in Anaheim, California. As of June 2023, Disneyland has 52 attractions with 49 rides (The term "attractions" is used by Disney as a catch-all term for rides, shows, and exhibits.)

Below is an incomplete list of the current attractions found in Disneyland, arranged by "land". These are only attractions from the Disneyland Park itself, not from Disney California Adventure, or other parts of the Disneyland Resort. Character meets and greets are not listed in this article.

== Main Street, USA ==
- Disneyland Railroad
- The Disney Gallery
- Main Street Vehicles
- Main Street Opera House
  - Walt Disney – A Magical Life
  - Great Moments with Mr. Lincoln
- Main Street Cinema

== Adventureland ==
- Walt Disney's Enchanted Tiki Room
- Jungle Cruise
- Indiana Jones Adventure: Temple of the Forbidden Eye
- Adventureland Treehouse

== Frontierland ==
- Big Thunder Mountain Railroad
- Rivers of America
  - Mark Twain Riverboat
  - Pirate's Lair on Tom Sawyer Island
  - Sailing Ship Columbia
- Frontierland Shootin' Exposition

== Fantasyland ==
- Fantasyland Theatre
- It's a Small World
- Mr. Toad's Wild Ride
- Peter Pan's Flight
- Pinocchio's Daring Journey
- Pixie Hollow
- Snow White's Enchanted Wish
- Storybook Land Canal Boats
- Dumbo the Flying Elephant
- Casey Jr. Circus Train
- Alice in Wonderland
- Matterhorn Bobsleds
- King Arthur Carrousel
- Mad Tea Party
- Sleeping Beauty Castle Walkthrough

== Tomorrowland ==
- Astro Orbiter
- Autopia
- Star Tours – The Adventures Continue
- Buzz Lightyear Astro Blasters
- Space Mountain
- Disneyland Monorail
- Disneyland Railroad
- Finding Nemo Submarine Voyage

== New Orleans Square ==
- Pirates of the Caribbean
- The Haunted Mansion
- Disneyland Railroad

== Bayou Country ==
- Rivers of America
  - Davy Crockett's Explorer Canoes
- The Many Adventures of Winnie the Pooh
- Tiana's Bayou Adventure

== Mickey's Toontown ==
- Mickey & Minnie's Runaway Railway
- Disneyland Railroad
- Mickey's House and Meet Mickey
- Minnie's House
- Roger Rabbit's Car Toon Spin
- Chip 'n' Dale's Gadgetcoaster
- CenTOONial Park
- Goofy's How-To-Play Yard
- Donald's Duck Pond

== Star Wars: Galaxy's Edge ==
- Millennium Falcon: Smuggler's Run
- Star Wars: Rise of the Resistance

== Entertainment ==
=== Parades ===
- Magic Happens (2020; 2023–2024) (Reopening in Summer 2027)

==== Seasonal Parades ====
- A Christmas Fantasy Parade

=== Projections ===
- Shadows of Memory: A Skywalker Saga (2025–present)

=== Fireworks ===
- Fantasmic! (1992–2016; 2017–2020; 2022–2023; 2024–present)
- Fire of the Rising Moons (2024–present)

==== Seasonal Fireworks ====
- Believe... In Holiday Magic
- Disney's Celebrate America
- Halloween Screams
- Fantasy in the Sky: Special New Year's Eve Countdown
- Remember... Dreams Come True (2005–2009, 2010–2014, 2017–2018, 2018–2019) (Returning in February 2027)

== See also ==
- List of former Disneyland attractions
- List of Disney California Adventure attractions
- List of former Disney California Adventure attractions
