= List of Shanghai Disneyland Park attractions =

Shanghai Disneyland is a theme park at the Shanghai Disney Resort in Pudong, Shanghai with many attractions.

== Gardens of Imagination ==
=== Current attractions ===
- Dumbo the Flying Elephant presented by China Eastern Airlines
- Fantasia Carousel
- Garden of the Twelve Friends presented by ICBC
- The Heart of Magic
- Marvel Comic Academy
- Marvel Universe
- Meet Mickey at the Gardens of Imagination

== Fantasyland ==
=== Current attractions ===
- Alice in Wonderland Maze
- Evergreen Playhouse
  - Frozen: A Sing-Along Celebration
- Hunny Pot Spin
- "Once Upon a Time" Adventure
- Peter Pan's Flight
- Seven Dwarfs Mine Train
- The Many Adventures of Winnie the Pooh
- Voyage to the Crystal Grotto

== Treasure Cove ==
=== Current attractions ===
- Explorer Canoes
- Eye of the Storm: Captain Jack’s Stunt Spectacular
- Pirates of the Caribbean: Battle for the Sunken Treasure presented by TMall
- Shipwreck Shore
- Siren's Revenge

== Adventure Isle ==
=== Current attractions ===
- Camp Discovery
- Roaring Rapids
- Soaring Over the Horizon presented by UnionPay
- Storyhouse Stage

=== Former attractions ===
- Tarzan: Call of the Jungle

== Tomorrowland ==
=== Current attractions ===
- Buzz Lightyear Planet Rescue
- Club Destin-E at Tomorrowland
- Jet Packs
- Stitch Space Base
  - Space Chat With Stitch
- TRON Lightcycle Power Run presented by Chevrolet
- Tomorrowland Pavilion
  - Pixar Adventurous Journey: Life Through Stories

=== Former attractions ===
- Tomorrowland Pavilion
  - Star Wars Launch Bay
  - Avatar: Explore Pandora
- Stitch Encounter

== Toy Story Land ==
=== Current attractions ===
- Slinky Dog Spin
- Rex's Racer
- Woody's Round-Up

== Zootopia ==
=== Current attractions ===
- Zootopia: Hot Pursuit

== Parades ==
=== Day parades ===
- Mickey's Storybook Express or Mickey and Friends Express
