= Rivers of America (Disney) =

Artificial waterway inside Disney parks

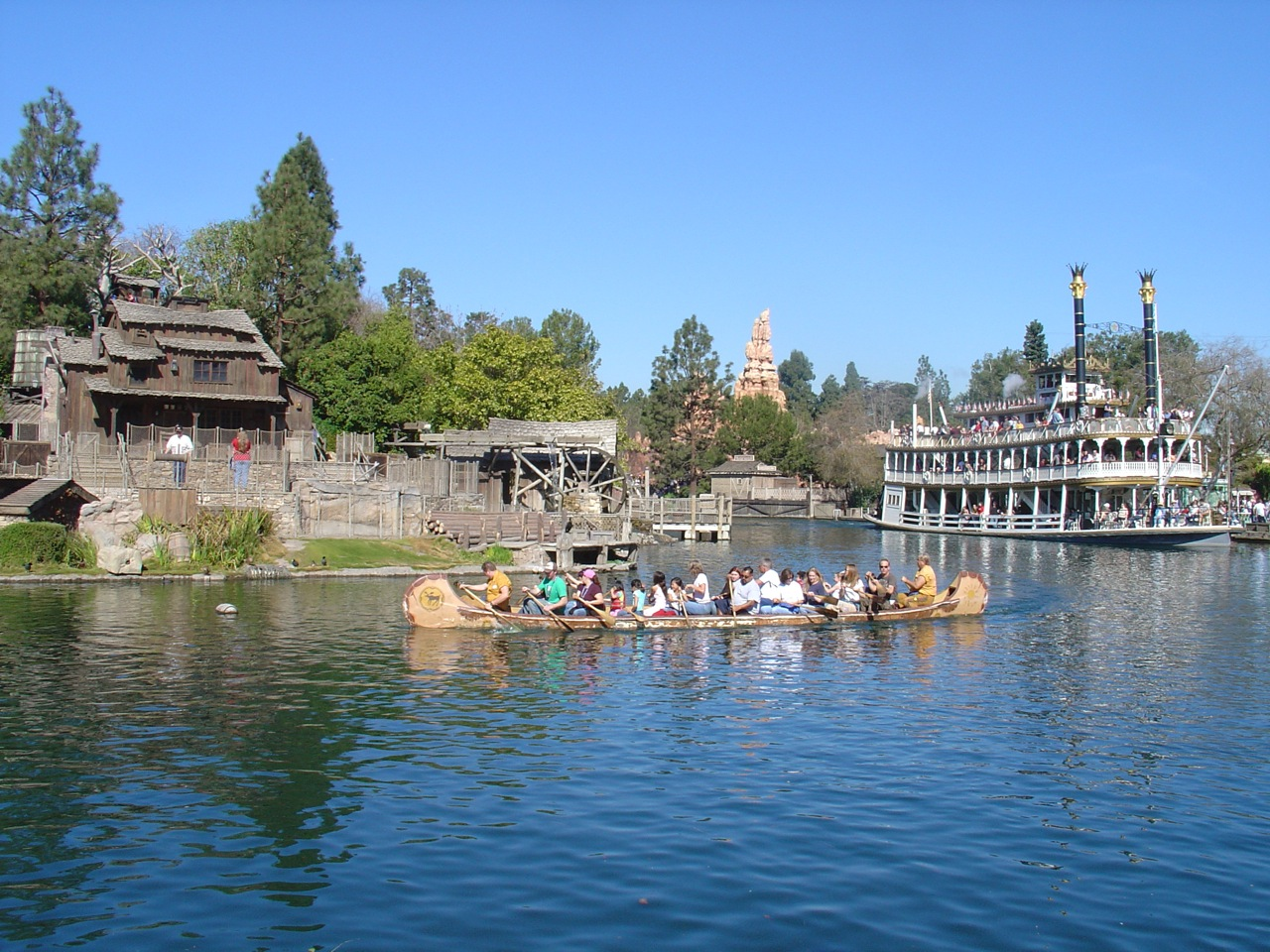
The Rivers of America and its various watercraft in Disneyland, 2007

Rivers of America is the artificial river located in Disneyland and Tokyo Disneyland. It was formerly located in Magic Kingdom. Other rivers with different names also exist in Disneyland Park Paris and Hong Kong Disneyland. The first river was built in Disneyland when the park opened in 1955. It surrounds Tom Sawyer Island, which guests reach by raft from Frontierland. Additionally, there are other water-based vehicles on the river. The various sights along the Rivers include a Native American tribe and Audio-Animatronic wildlife.

At Disneyland Park Paris, Rivers of the Far West is home to Big Thunder Mountain, and at Hong Kong Disneyland, there is no Frontierland, so the Imagineers merged Rivers of America with the Adventureland Jungle Cruise attraction. Jungle river rafts travel around Rivers of Adventure, encountering similar situations as in the Jungle Cruise attraction. In the middle of the Rivers sits Tarzan's Treehouse, which can be reached by River Rafts.

Different steamboat and ship replicas sail on the rivers:

- Disneyland – the Mark Twain Riverboat and the Sailing Ship Columbia
- Tokyo Disneyland – the Mark Twain Riverboat
- Disneyland Park Paris – the Molly Brown Riverboat

== Disneyland ==
At Disneyland Park in Anaheim, the river passes through Frontierland, New Orleans Square, and Bayou Country.

=== History ===
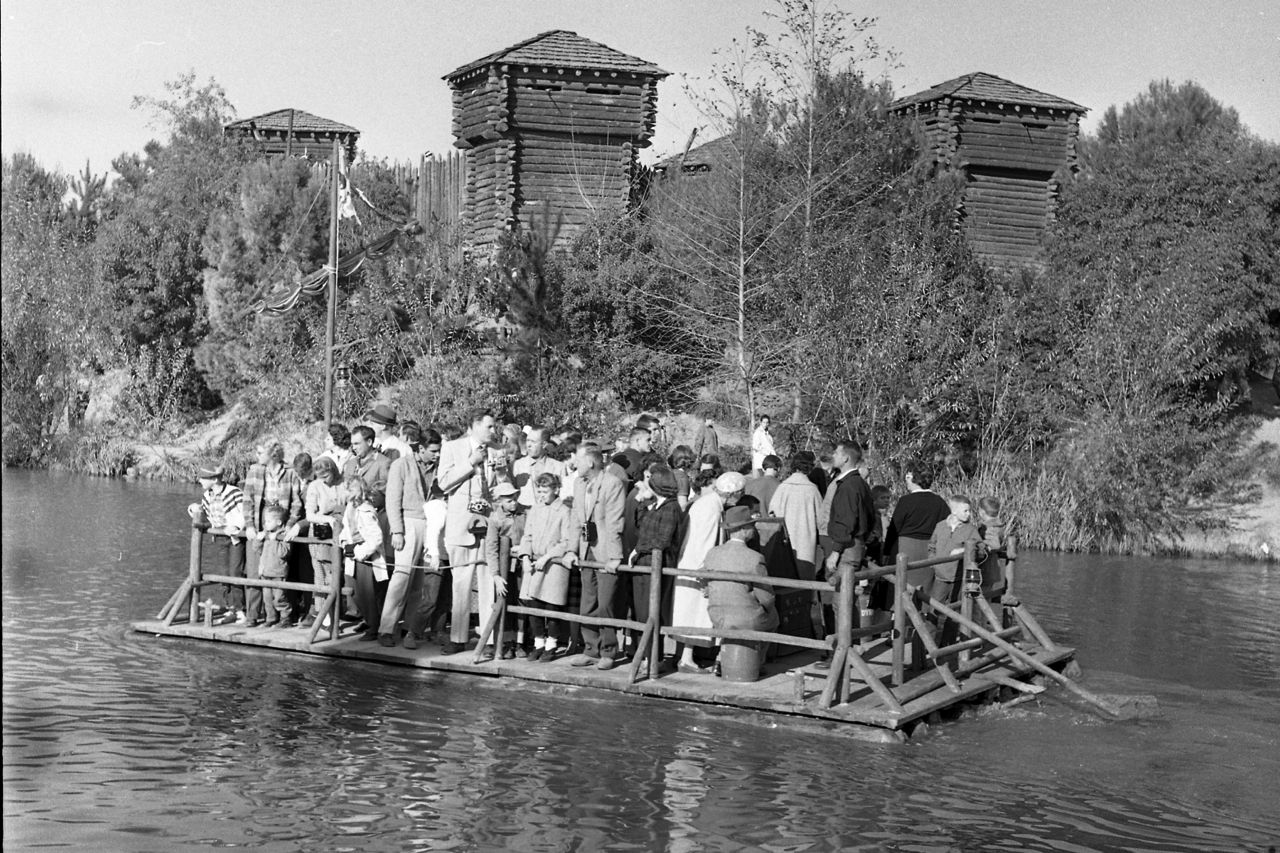
Disneyland guests take a raft to Tom Sawyer Island, about 1960

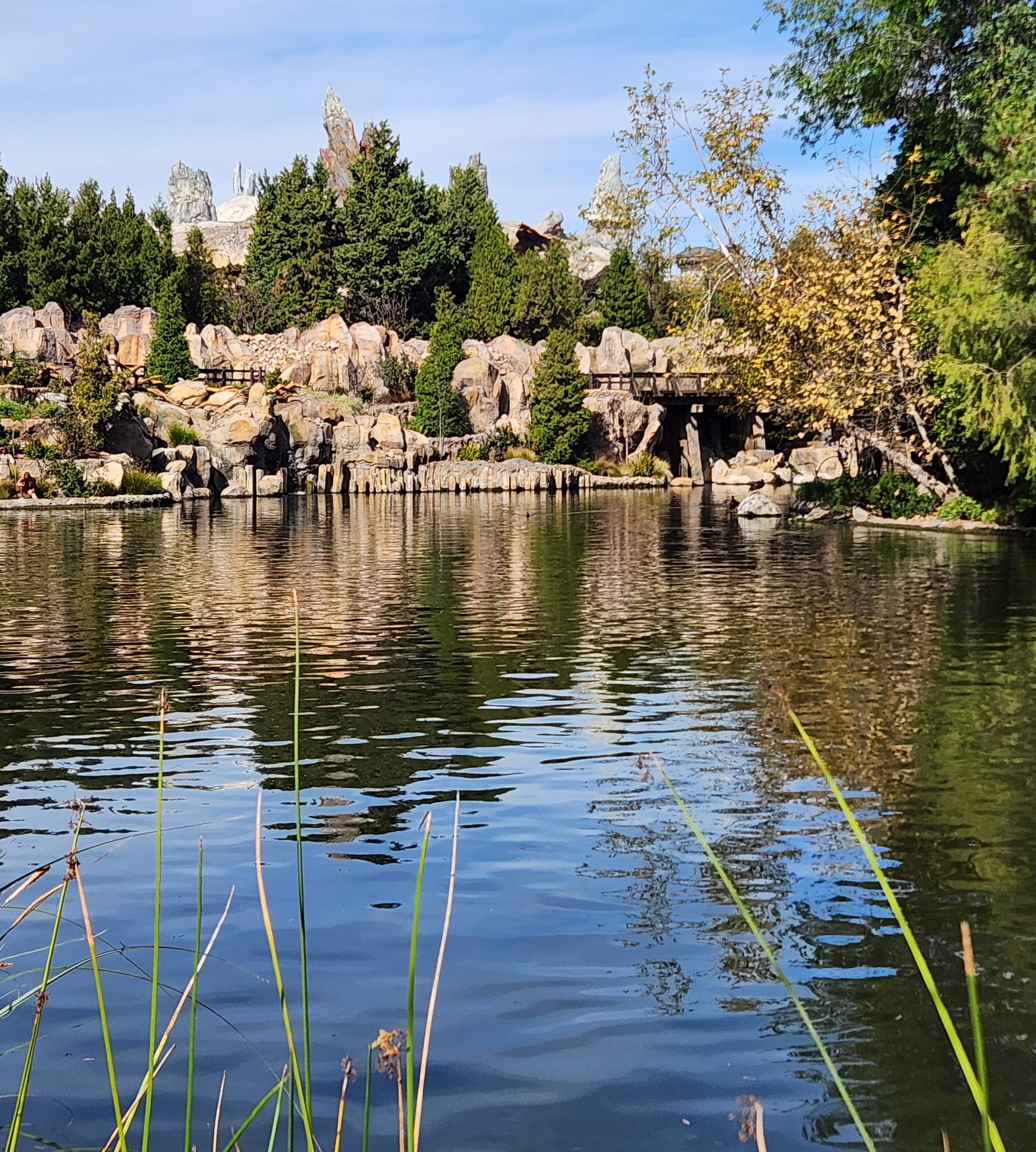
Rivers of America as seen from the pathway from Bayou Country to Star Wars: Galaxy's Edge

Rivers of America existed since the opening of Disneyland on July 17, 1955, beginning with the Mark Twain Riverboat. However, the island that the river surrounds was bare. The Mike Fink Keel Boats opened in December of that year. A dry dock area for refurbishments has also been included since opening day.

In 1956, Indian War Canoes (now Davy Crockett's Explorer Canoes), as well as the Tom Sawyer Island area on the center island that is accessible by raft, were opened. The Sailing Ship Columbia was introduced in 1958. The nighttime show Fantasmic! began showing on the river on May 13, 1992. The Mike Fink Keel Boats closed in 1997.

In September 2015, Disneyland Resort announced that Rivers of America and its attractions would temporarily close starting January 11, 2016, to prepare for Star Wars: Galaxy's Edge. An official Disneyland Twitter account confirmed that Rivers of America would have a new route when it reopened from construction. Rivers of America and its attractions reopened in July 2017.

=== Ecology ===
At Disneyland, the Rivers of America is dyed for show purposes to obscure underwater infrastructure; maintenance crews add green or brown dye periodically, and the river is generally 4–8 ft (1.2–2.4 m) deep. When the river is drained for major projects, Disneyland diverts the water for treatment and reuse rather than discharging it to the ocean. In 2010 the park worked with the Orange County Water District to purify and bank roughly six million gallons for groundwater recharge, and during the 2016–17 rerouting for Star Wars: Galaxy's Edge officials said the water would be diverted, treated, stored and ultimately returned to the river.

Mosquito abatement at and around the resort is coordinated with the Orange County Mosquito and Vector Control District, which uses an integrated program that includes biological controls such as stocking mosquitofish in suitable, closed water bodies; the District limits their use to sources that do not connect to natural waterways.

=== Upkeep ===
Disneyland operates the Rivers of America as part of a larger, connected “dark water” system. As designed in 1955, roughly two-thirds of the resort’s storm drains route to linked waterways—including the Rivers of America, Storybook Land canals, the castle moat, Carnation Creek, and the Jungle Cruise—where flows are detained and receive natural biological treatment before recirculation.

When the river was first filled in 1955, water seeped through Anaheim’s sandy soil; the basin was subsequently lined with clay to retain water. For major maintenance, Disneyland has partnered with the Orange County Water District to drain, treat, and bank millions of gallons from the river for groundwater recharge rather than sending it to the ocean.

To maintain the desired appearance and obscure underwater infrastructure, maintenance crews periodically add small amounts of green or brown dye to the river.

=== Attractions ===
==== Current attractions ====
- Mark Twain Riverboat
- Sailing Ship Columbia
- Davy Crockett's Explorer Canoes
- Pirate's Lair on Tom Sawyer Island

==== Former attractions ====
- Mike Fink Keel Boats

=== Entertainment ===
==== Current entertainment ====
- Fantasmic!

==== Seasonal ====
- Halloween Screams
- Believe... In Holiday Magic
- Disney's Celebrate America
- Remember... Dreams Come True (Returning in February 2027)

==== Former seasonal ====
- Disneyland Forever
- Together Forever
- Wondrous Journeys

=== Other uses of the river ===
Fantasmic!, which opened on May 13, 1992, takes place on both the River and continuing onto Tom Sawyer Island.

In 2003, the motion picture Pirates of the Caribbean: The Curse of the Black Pearl had its world premiere on the Rivers at Disneyland, with hundreds of celebrities and movie stars viewing the film on a purpose-built 90-foot-tall (27 m) projection screen.

In 2006, the film's sequel, Pirates of the Caribbean: Dead Man's Chest, premiered on June 24 on the Rivers as well, two days before the Pirates of the Caribbean attraction re-opened after a lengthy refurbishment on the Rivers in New Orleans Square. In 2007, it hosted the gala for the premiere of the third installment of the film series, Pirates of the Caribbean: At World's End.

The world premiere of Pirates of the Caribbean: On Stranger Tides was on May 7, 2011, at a premium ticket screening at Disneyland in Anaheim, California, home of the original Pirates of the Caribbean ride that inspired the film series. Many of the film's stars were in attendance. The screening took place on the river with a temporary outdoor theater constructed along with a massive movie screen and sound system installed on the stage on Tom Sawyer's Island. The Sailing Ship Columbia was decorated like 'The Black Pearl' from the movie franchise and moved forward in proximity to the theater seating.

Since the opening of the Davy Crockett Explorer canoes, Disneyland Cast Members have hosted an annual event called "The Canoe Races" which takes place before the park opening. Cast Members form teams and race in a canoe. The race is watched from the Frontierland/New Orleans Square area by many Cast Members who cheer on their friends and teammates.

=== Deaths ===
On two separate occasions, park guests have drowned while trying to swim to shore:

- On June 20, 1973, an 18-year-old male drowned while attempting to swim across the Rivers of America. He and his 10-year-old brother stayed on Tom Sawyer's Island past closing time by hiding in an area that is off-limits to guests. When they wanted to leave the island, they decided to swim across the river even though the younger brother did not know how to swim. The victim attempted to carry his younger brother on his back but drowned halfway across. The teenager's body was found the next morning. The younger brother was able to stay afloat by "dog paddling" until a ride operator rescued him.
- On June 4, 1983, another 18-year-old male drowned in the Rivers of America while trying to pilot a rubber emergency boat from Tom Sawyer's Island that he and a friend had stolen from a "cast members only" area of the island.

== Magic Kingdom ==
At Magic Kingdom, the river passed through Frontierland and Liberty Square. The Magic Kingdom river also hosted a cast member canoe race, similar to Disneyland's, called Canoe Races of the World.

In August 2024, Disney announced that the Magic Kingdom version of Rivers of America would be removed to make way for an expansion of Frontierland themed to the American wilderness from Pixar's Cars franchise. The Liberty Belle Riverboat and Tom Sawyer Island ultimately closed on July 7, 2025 to make way for this expansion.

=== Former attractions ===
- Davy Crockett Explorer Canoes
- Mike Fink Keel Boats
- Tom Sawyer Island
- Liberty Belle Riverboat
- Admiral Joe Fowler Riverboat

== Tokyo Disneyland ==
At Tokyo Disneyland, the river passes through Westernland and Critter Country.

=== Attractions ===
- Mark Twain Riverboat
- Beaver Brothers Explorer Canoes
- Tom Sawyer Island

== Disneyland Park Paris ==
At Disneyland Park Paris, the river is known as the Rivers of the Far West, and is part of Frontierland. Big Thunder Mountain takes the place of Tom Sawyer Island.

In December 2025, it was announced that the two new scenes will be added to the Rivers of the Far West, which will be debut by summer 2026, and inspired by original drawings by Marc Davis.

=== Attractions ===
==== Current attractions ====
- Big Thunder Mountain
- Thunder Mesa Riverboat Landing

==== Former attractions ====
- Indian Canoes
- River Rogue Keel Boats
