= Disney riverboats =

Watercraft ride vehicles at Disney parks

Mark Twain Riverboat
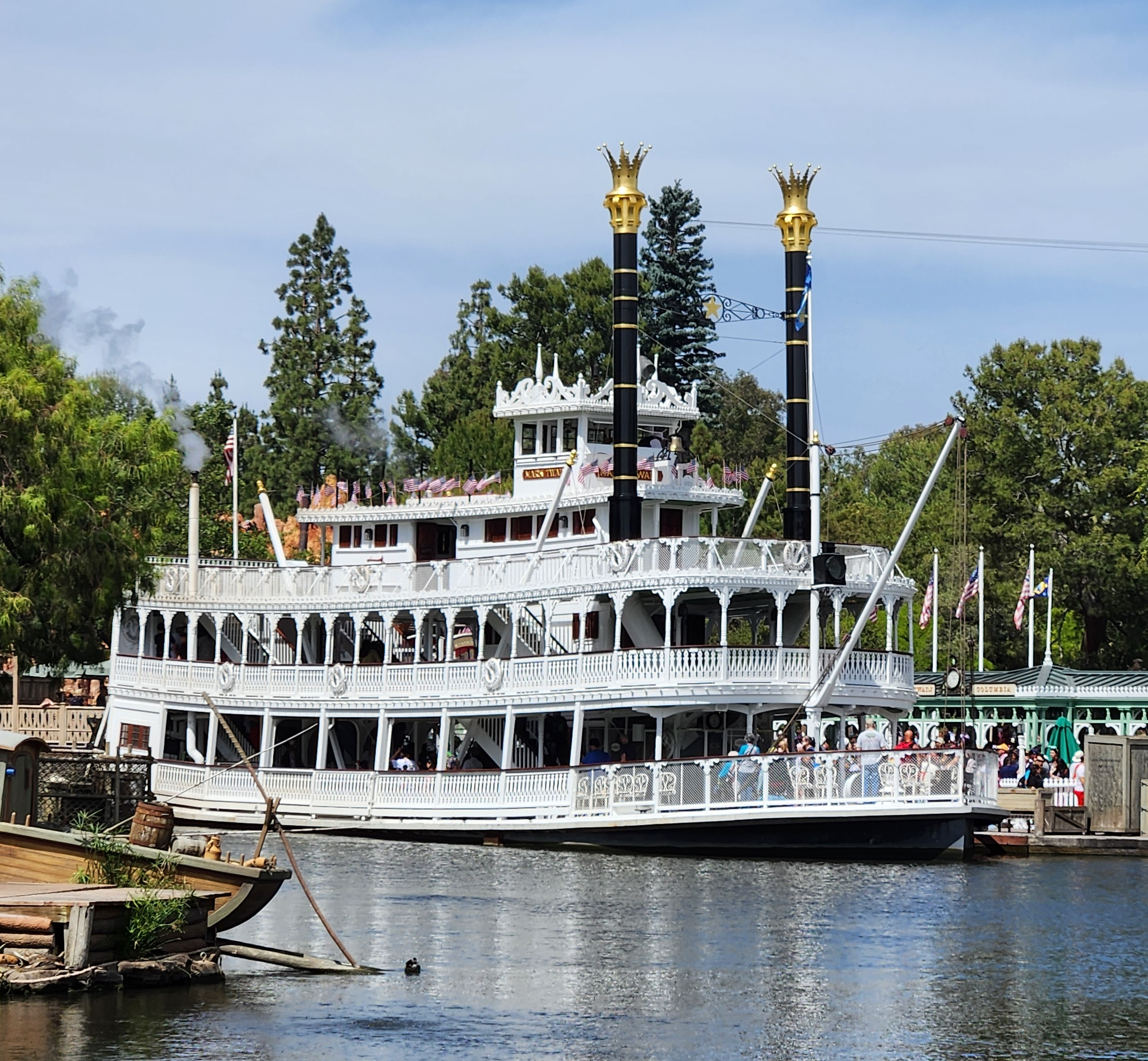
- Mark Twain Riverboat at Disneyland

Disneyland
- Area: Frontierland
- Coordinates: 33.81226°N 117.92062°W
- Status: Operating
- Opening date: July 17, 1955

Magic Kingdom
- Name: The Liberty Belle
- Area: Liberty Square
- Coordinates: 28.4196°N 81.5829°W
- Status: Closed
- Opening date: May 20, 1973
- Closing date: July 7, 2025
- Replaced by: Miss Fritter's Daredevil Spin-Along, Cars Ridge Run Rally & Villains Land

Tokyo Disneyland
- Area: Westernland
- Coordinates: 35.63156°N 139.88303°E
- Status: Operating
- Opening date: April 15, 1983

Disneyland Park (Paris)
- Name: Molly Brown Riverboat 1992- Mark Twain Riverboat 1992-2011
- Area: Frontierland
- Coordinates: 48.8711°N 2.7763°E
- Status: Operating
- Opening date: April 12, 1992

Ride statistics
- Attraction type: Steamboat
- Designer: Walt Disney Imagineering
- Music: Down in New Orleans, Almost There & Country-style background music
- Wheelchair accessible

The Disney riverboats are paddle steamer watercraft attraction ride vehicles operating on a track on a series of attractions located at Disney theme parks around the world.

The first was the Mark Twain Riverboat, located at the Disneyland theme park in Anaheim, California, on which passengers embark on a scenic, 12-minute journey around the Rivers of America. Originally named Mark Twain Steamboat when the park opened in 1955, the 5/8-scale stern-wheeler was the first functional steamboat to be built in the United States for 50 years. Other Disney riverboat attractions also appear at Tokyo Disneyland and Disneyland Park Paris.

== Disneyland ==
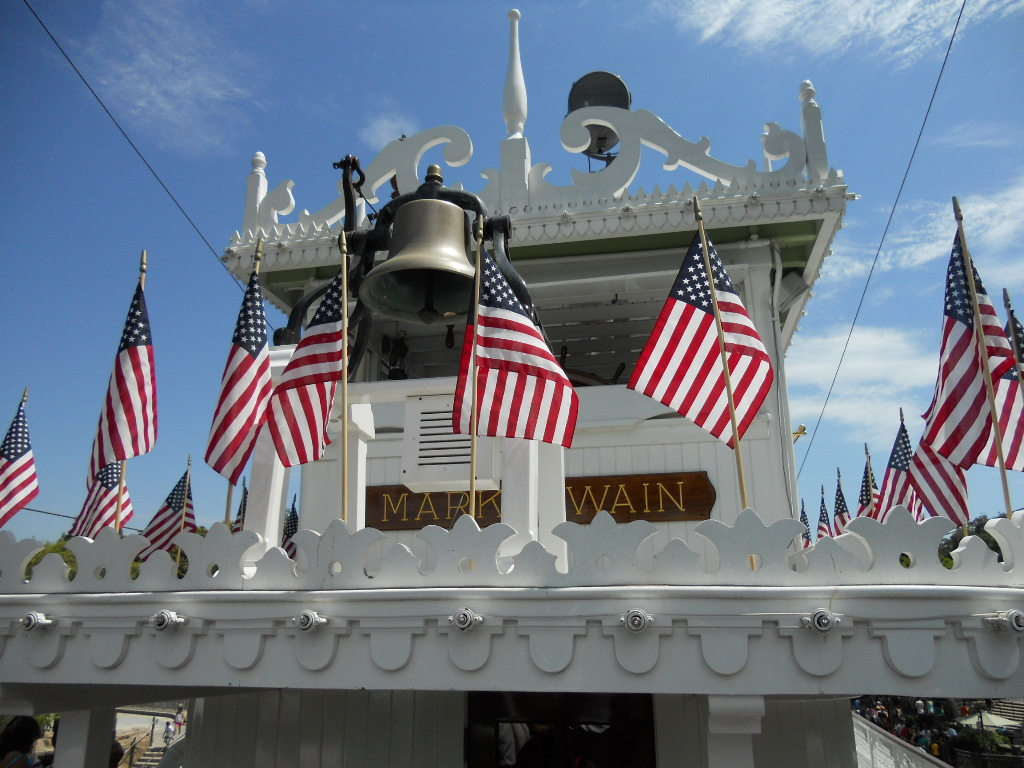
Mark Twain riverboat's wheelhouse and bell

Passengers wait for the 150-ton, 28-foot-high (8.5 m), 105-foot-long (32 m) riverboat, which departs every 20 minutes, inside a sheltered area in the Frontierland section of the park. The waiting area resembles a real riverboat loading area, with cargo deliveries sharing space on the dock. Historic United States flags are displayed at the attraction's entrance.

Upon boarding Mark Twain, passengers are free to move about her three levels. The lower deck's bow has chairs. The upper deck provides a vantage point for viewing landmarks during the voyage. The wheelhouse, where Mark Twain's pilot is stationed, is located on the upper deck. The lower level of the wheelhouse features sleeping quarters and a sink to maintain the illusion of this being the captain's living quarters.

The pilot signals the departure and arrival of Mark Twain using a whistle and bell system, along with various signals to other river craft attractions. Because the riverboat travels along a hidden I-beam guide rail throughout the ride, the pilot does not maneuver the ship. Instead, the pilot serves as lookout for other river traffic, such as Davy Crockett's Explorer Canoes and the rafts to Pirate's Lair at Tom Sawyer Island, and communicates his observations with the boiler engineer. The boiler engineer is stationed on the bottom deck towards the stern. This is where the throttle and reverser are located. From here, the boiler engineer controls the speed and forward or reverse direction of the riverboat. Steam from the boiler is used to power the paddle wheels which push the craft along its guide-way.

The voyage on the Rivers of America around Tom Sawyer Island features pre-recorded navigational commands by Jim Etchison and Peter Renaday. The captain is played by Disney voice actor Stephen Stanton, who speaks of his days piloting a riverboat.

On most days, Mark Twain begins operation when the park opens. On days when Fantasmic! is being performed, the riverboat, which plays a role in the show, will close a couple of hours before showtime. On other nights, Mark Twain will operate through the evening, using a rooftop spotlight to illuminate sights, with the final trip beginning approximately 30 minutes before park closing.

=== History ===
A Mississippi steamboat was included in the plans for the first Disney amusement park that was to be built across the street from his Walt Disney Studios in Burbank, California. Although this park was abandoned in favor of the much larger Disneyland, the plan for having a riverboat attraction was retained.

Because Mark Twain was the first functional paddlewheeler built in the United States in 50 years, the WED designers conducted extensive research to build it like riverboats were built in the heyday of steam powered ships. The design was by D.M.Callis, Naval Architect, former naval architect for Todd Pacific Shipyards. The decks were assembled at the Disney Studios at Burbank, while the 105-foot hull was constructed at Todd Shipyards, Los Angeles Division, San Pedro, California (where portions of Columbia were built years later).

Joe Fowler, Disneyland's construction supervisor and former navy admiral, insisted on creating a drydock for the ship along what became the Rivers of America. Walt Disney, dismayed at how much land was taken up by the massive excavation, referred to the drydock first as "Joe's Ditch", and then later, "Fowler's Harbor", the name by which it goes by today. Disney remained a supporter of the riverboat, funding its construction from his personal funds when corporate funding fell short.

On the first "fill-the-river" day, the water pumped into the Rivers of America soaked through the riverbed. Fowler found a supply of clay to replace the soil stabilizer used to line the river, and the second "fill-the-river" day was successful.

Mark Twain had her maiden voyage on July 13, 1955, four days before the park opened, for a private party celebrating Walt and Lillian Disney's 30th wedding anniversary. Before the party, as Fowler was checking to make sure everything would be ready for the 300 invited guests, he found Lillian sweeping the decks and assisted her.

Disneyland's opening day brought further issues for Mark Twain. Actress Irene Dunne, star of the movie Show Boat, had trouble breaking a bottle of water (from many major American rivers) across the vessel's bow for her christening on Dateline Disney. During the riverboat's first official voyage, when the crowd moved to one side of the boat to view a passing scene of an Indian encampment or other sight, the boat listed, and water poured over the deck, as no one had determined Mark Twain's maximum safe passenger capacity. This oversight caused Mark Twain to nearly capsize on a voyage a few days later when ride operators continued to wave more than 500 guests on board until the deck neared the water line. As the ship traversed the sparsely vegetated river route, it came loose from its track and got stuck in the muddy banks. Immediately, the park established a maximum capacity of 300 passengers, remaining in effect today.

Mark Twain has had a successful 71-year-career as a theme park attraction. During its first few years of operation, passengers could buy a non-alcoholic mint julep aboard or listen to card and checker players re-enact dialogue of that era. Occasionally the Disneyland band would play music on the lower deck bow to entertain both the passengers and the theme park visitors on the river banks.

Mark Twain underwent a major refurbishment during the spring of 1995, during which the decks and boiler were replaced.

September 24, 1995 saw the first and only Disney Fantasyland Wedding, to this day, to be held on an attraction, in theme clothing. An Orange County couple, Kevin and Patricia Sullivan exchanged vows on the bow of the boat as she circled the Rivers of America. The groom's father Ed Sullivan, a 50-year Disney veteran, donned the classic Mark Twain costume for the once-in-a-lifetime ceremony. The couple sealed their vows by pulling the ship's steam whistle together. From atop the upper-most deck, the couple let loose ropes, unfurling a ship-sized JUST MARRIED banner across the stern.

When the Rivers of America was drained in 2002, the boat was found to have considerable hull damage. It underwent a refurbishment in 2004, to repair the hull, which included replacing the keel. For the park's 50th Anniversary celebration in 2005, a new, more colorful paint scheme was applied to the riverboat.

On January 11, 2016, the Mark Twain Riverboat, along with the other attractions along the Rivers of America, were temporarily closed for the construction of Star Wars: Galaxy's Edge. These attractions reopened on July 29, 2017.

== Magic Kingdom ==
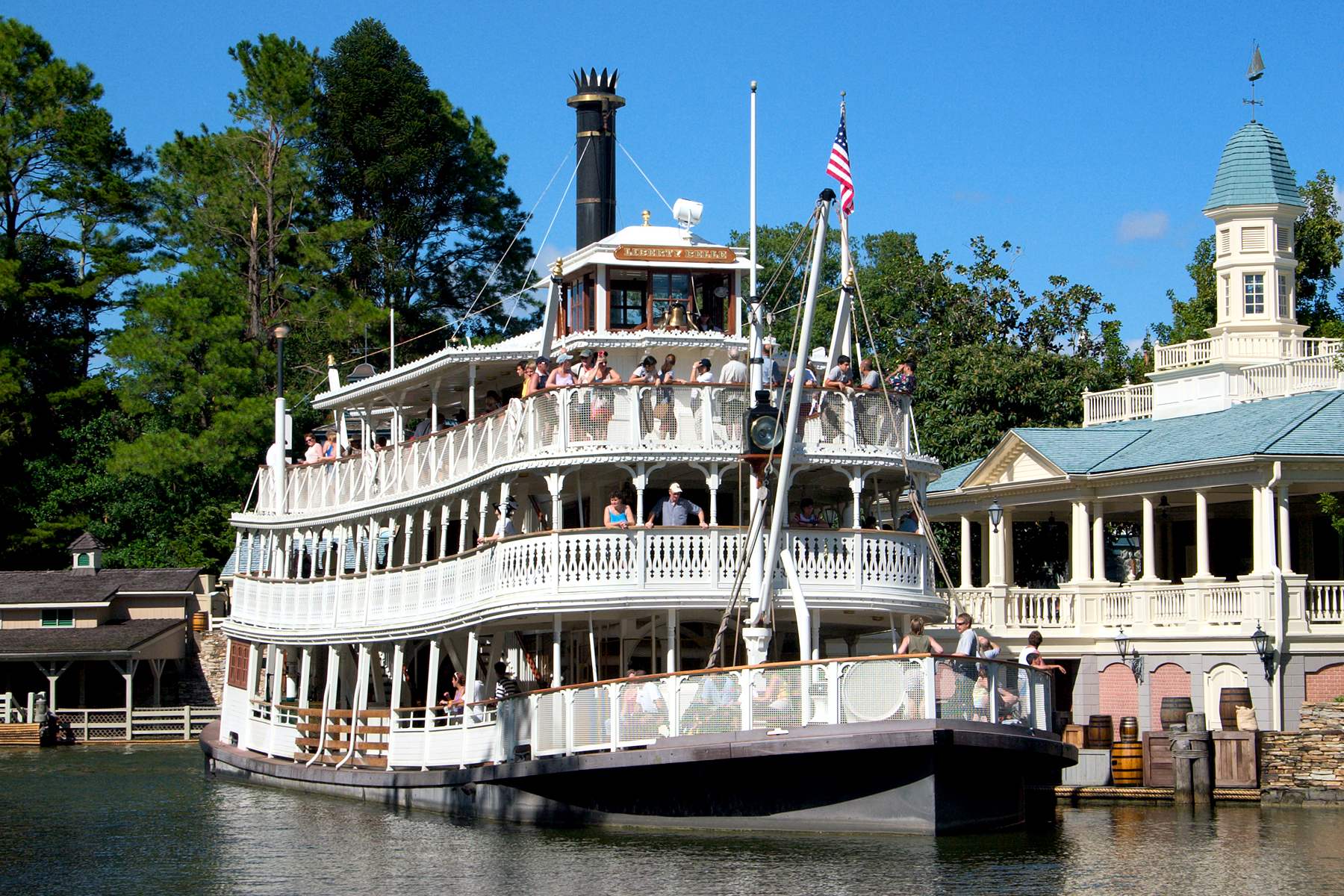
The former Liberty Belle at the Magic Kingdom

The Magic Kingdom theme park in Bay Lake, Florida had a Liberty Square Riverboat attraction, in which the boat is named Liberty Belle. This ride was similar to that at Disneyland in which the boat traveled around Tom Sawyer Island and featured scenic views of the park. During the early years, the Magic Kingdom featured two riverboats: Admiral Joe Fowler, a sternwheeler named for Disneyland's construction supervisor, and Richard F. Irvine, a sternwheeler named for a WED executive.

Admiral Joe Fowler served from October 2, 1971, one day after park opening, until the fall of 1980, when she was retired after less than ten years of operation when she was destroyed when falling from a crane onto her drydock. Richard F. Irvine came into service on May 20, 1973, but was renamed Liberty Belle in 1996 after everything except for the hull, boiler, and engines was stripped off, and an all-new superstructure was constructed from aluminum and vinyl. In 2018, the Liberty Belle was completely overhauled with a new boiler.

In August 2024, it was announced that the Magic Kingdom version of Rivers of America would be closed to make way for Miss Fritter's Daredevil Spin-Along & Cars Ridge Run Rally, 2 attractions themed to the American wilderness from Pixar's Cars franchise and Villains Land. As such, the Liberty Belle was planned to stop operating as well. In June 2025, it was announced that the Liberty Belle would close on July 7, 2025.

== Disneyland Park Paris ==
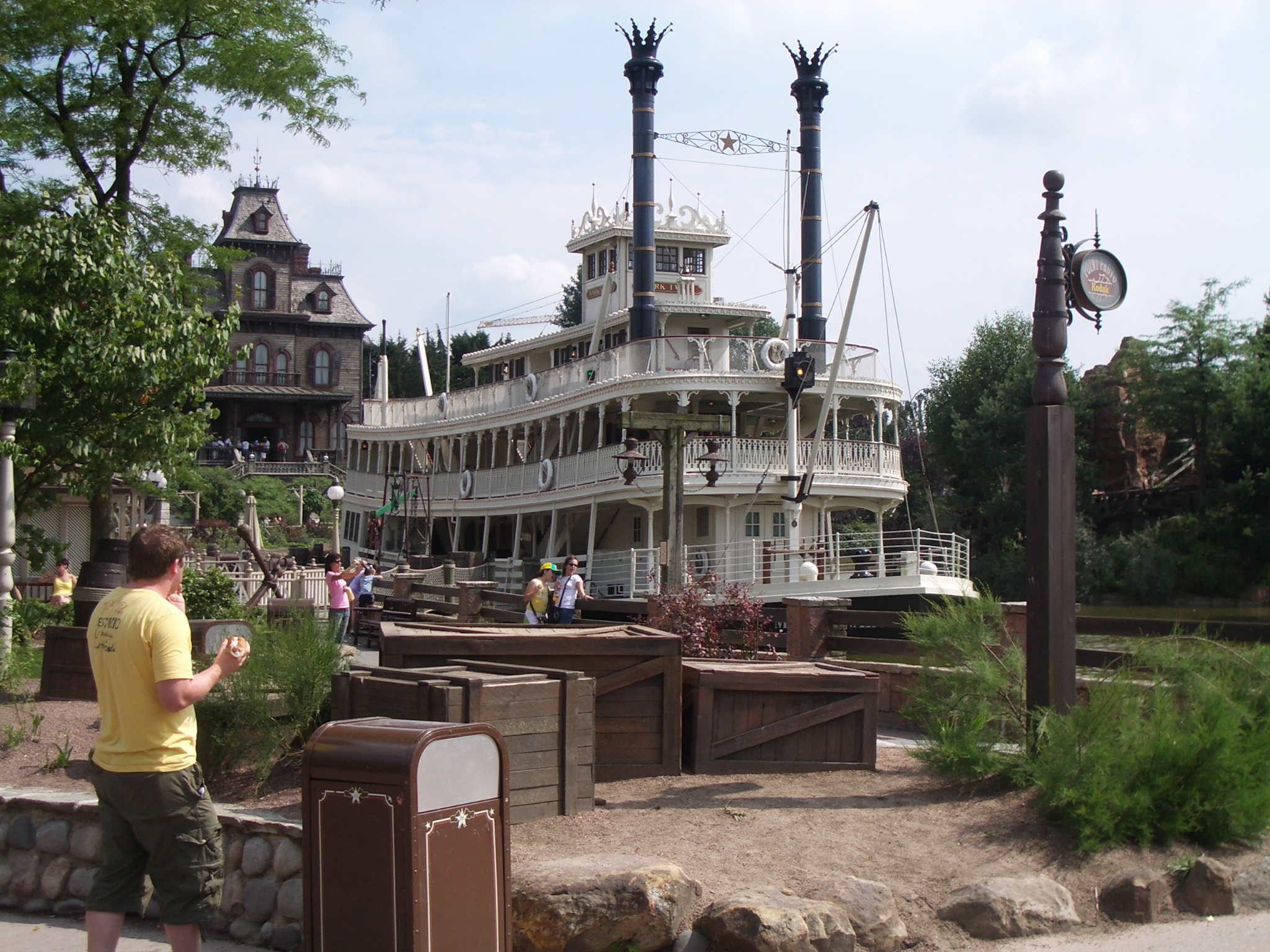
Mark Twain

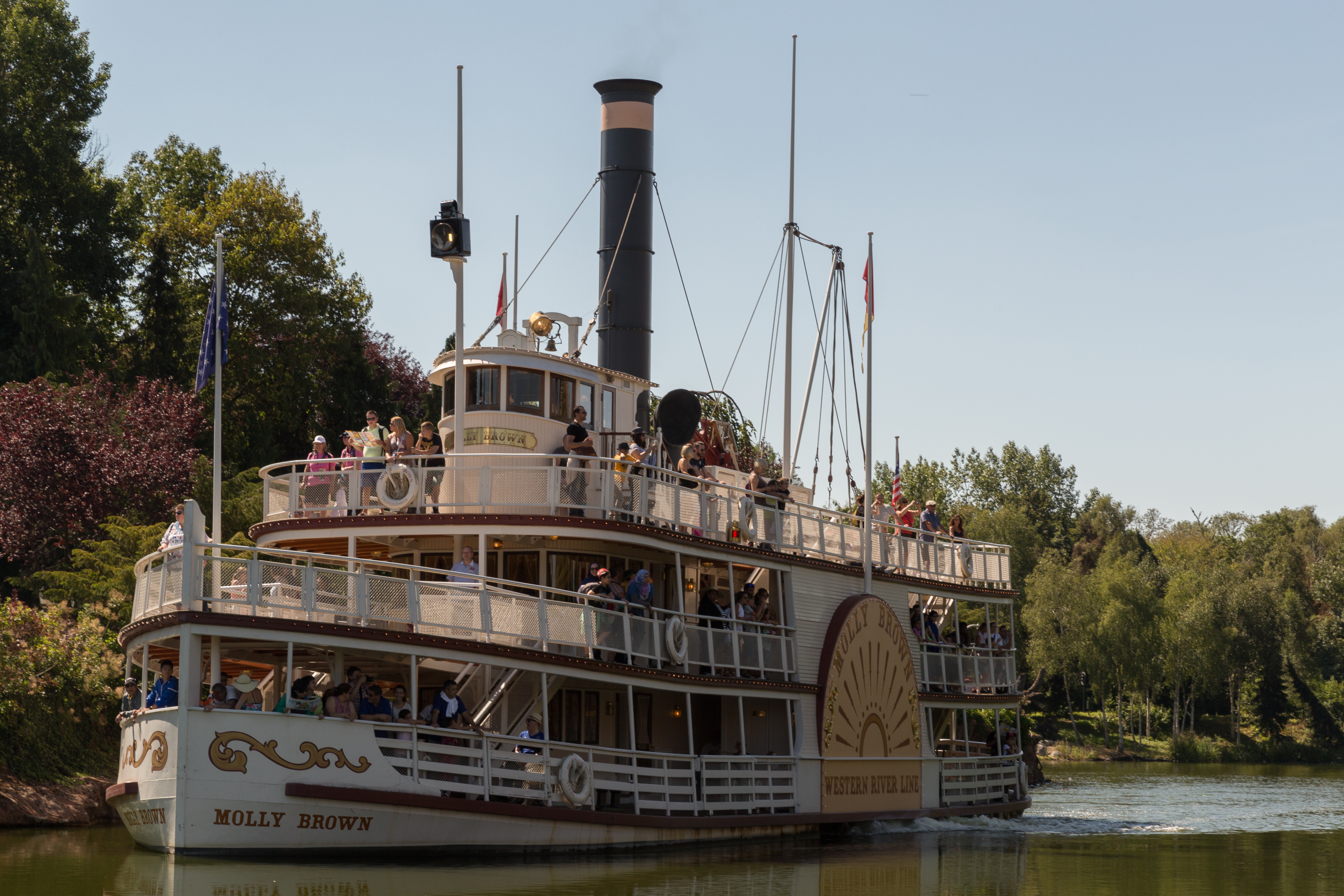
Molly Brown

The Frontierland area of Disneyland Park Paris features two riverboats, Mark Twain and Molly Brown. Each riverboat features a recorded conversation between the Captain and Mark Twain or Molly Brown. Since the storyline takes place in the fictional town of Thunder Mesa, most of the spiel deals with the sights of Big Thunder Mountain, Phantom Manor, Wilderness Island, Smuggler's Cove, an old snoring fisherman, Yellowstone National Park geysers, dinosaur remains, and more. The two river boats are:

- Mark Twain, based on the Anaheim Park's original riverboat, a sternwheeler.
- Molly Brown, named for Titanic-survivor Molly Brown. This boat is the only sidewheeler in a Disney Park.

On May 16, 2005, Molly Brown's engine overheated as the boat rounded the corner at the back of the Rivers of the Far West. Although there was no visible fire, smoke damaged the ship and her engines, rendering her immobile. Guests were ferried ashore by the River Rogue Keelboats. The engine system was badly damaged and Molly Brown was out of operation for many months, while Mark Twain's ongoing refurbishment at the dry dock was finished.

In September 2005, Molly Brown was moved to the dry dock, and in March 2006, Mark Twain resumed operation from Thunder Mesa Riverboat Landing. It was not until September that Molly Brown's long refurbishment finally began, and was completed in late April 2007.

Despite the refurbishment, Molly Brown had to be rebuilt again in 2010 from scratch. On March 25, 2011, she was back in business, with a new recording of Molly Brown's speech in English, which used to be in French. The Mark Twain hasn't operated since 2011, and has spent most of that time in dry dock. In 2014, it was reported that the Mark Twain was falling apart due to lack of maintenance. As of 2025, all references to the Mark Twain have been removed from the associated websites.

== Tokyo Disneyland ==
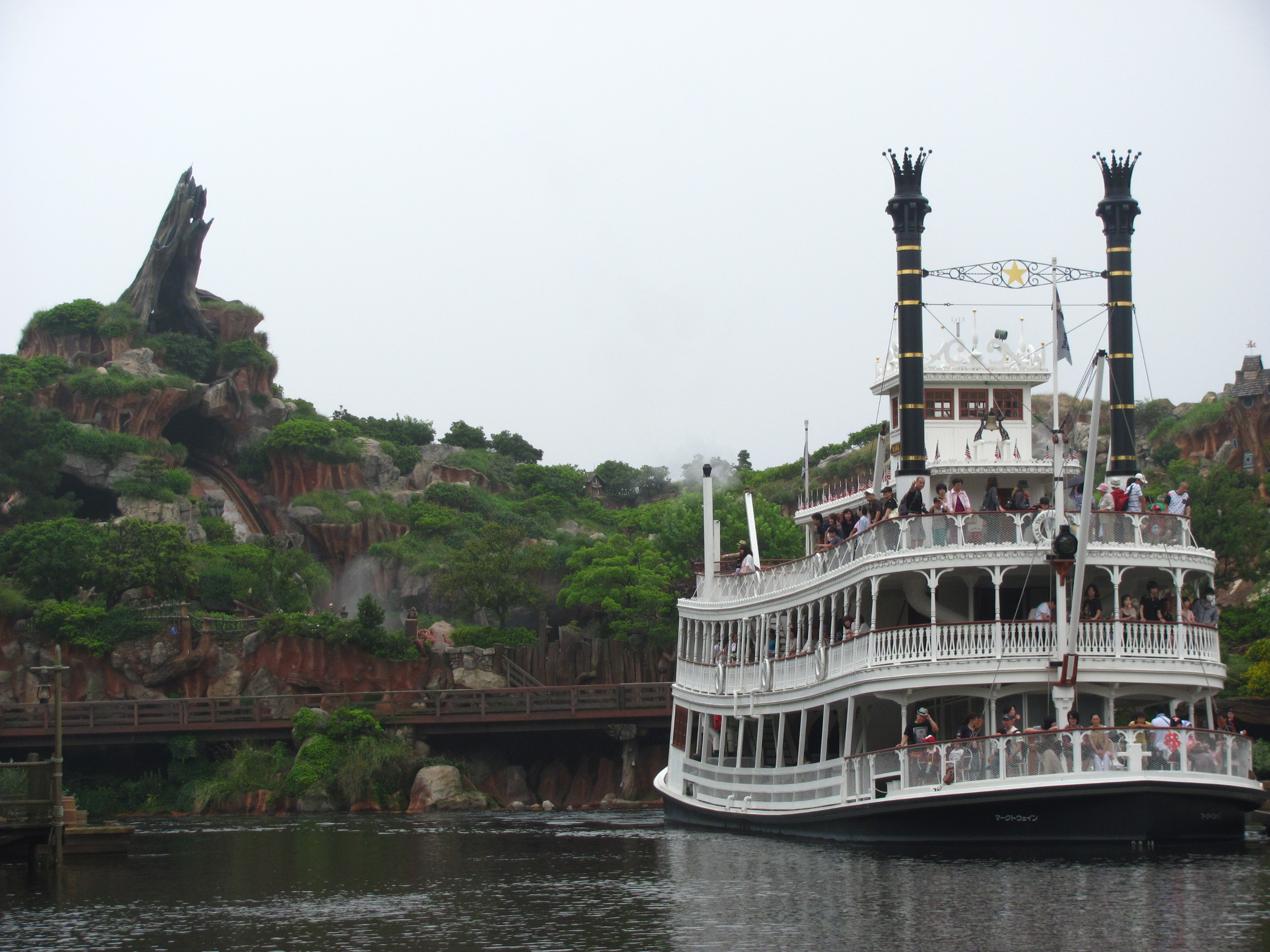
The Mark Twain Riverboat at Tokyo Disneyland, with Splash Mountain in the background.

Tokyo Disneyland's Mark Twain riverboat is so large that it is required by law to be registered. Its home port is listed as Urayasu. The steam engine machinery used on this riverboat is from the now-destroyed Admiral Joe Fowler Riverboat at the Magic Kingdom. From the time of its opening until September 2006 its sponsor was Nippon Suisan Kaisha.

== Technical ==
Mark Twain riverboat burns biodiesel fuel in its boiler, heating water into steam, which is routed to two pistons that turn the paddlewheel. Spent exhaust is then routed back to the boiler. The riverboat is guided through the Rivers of America via an I-beam track, which is hidden beneath the green and brown dyed water. The boat draws only 18 inches (460 mm) of water, as the 'river' is rather shallow. At its deepest point it is less than 8 feet (2.4 m) near the switch at Fowler's Harbor, where it resides when not in operation. The boat uses fresh water from a tank on board to prevent contaminants from the water in the Rivers of America fouling the boiler.

== See also ==
- List of Disneyland attractions
- List of Tokyo Disneyland attractions
- List of Disneyland Park (Paris) attractions

== Bibliography ==
- Bright, Randy (1987). Disneyland:Inside Story. New York: Harry N. Abrams, Inc. pp. 43, 76–80, 104–105. ISBN 0-8109-0811-5.
