= Sailing Ship Columbia =

Replica ship attraction at Disneyland

Coordinates: 33.81234°N 117.92062°W

- Attraction poster

Disneyland
- Area: Frontierland
- Status: Operating
- Opening date: June 14, 1958

Ride statistics
- Attraction type: Sailing ship
- Manufacturer: Todd Shipyards
- Designer: Walt Disney Imagineering; Joe Fowler; Ray Wallace
- Theme: 18th-century sailing ship
- Length: 110 ft (34 m)
- Participants per group: 300
- Duration: 12 minutes
- Wheelchair accessible

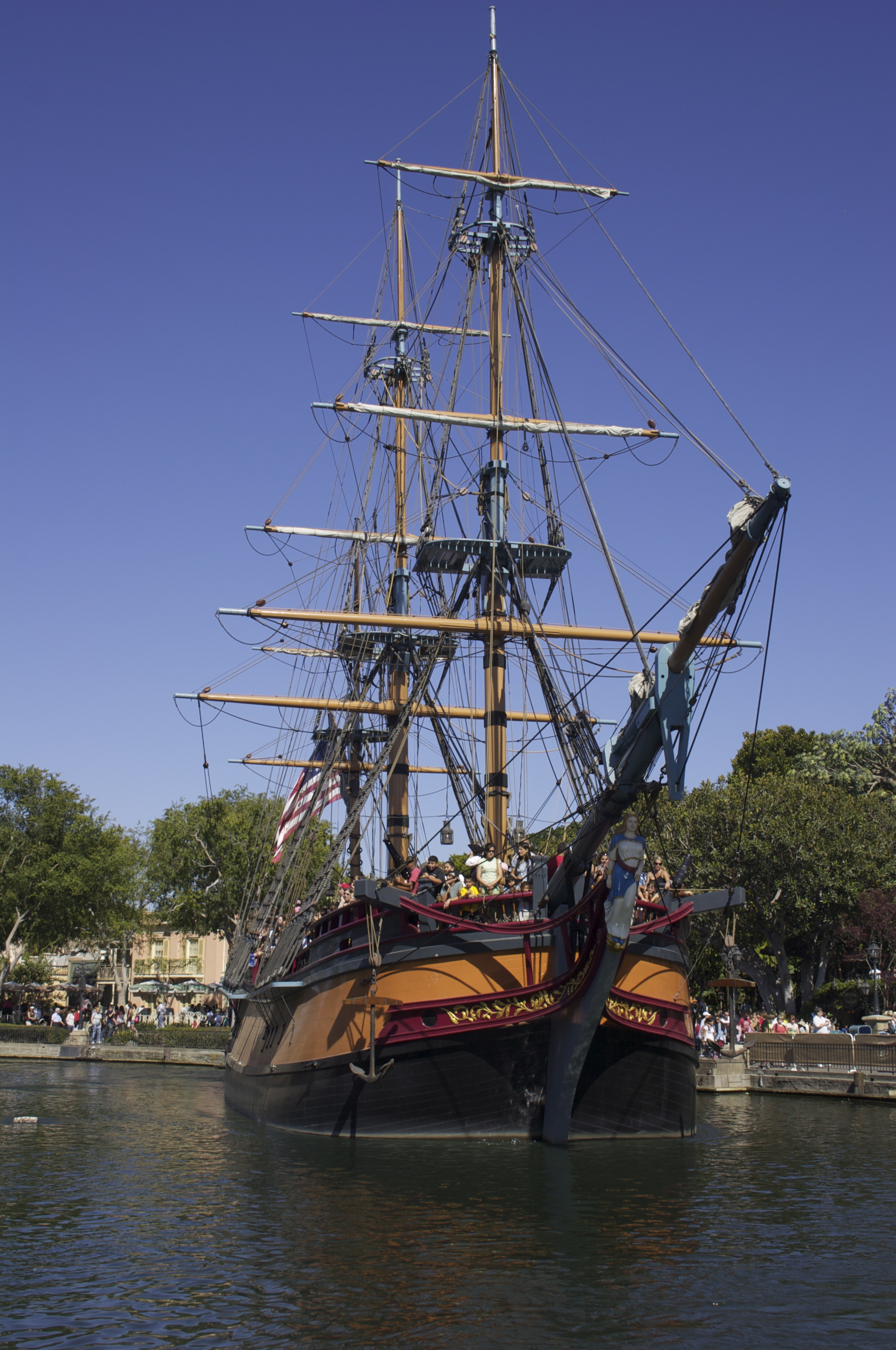
- The ship sits in the Rivers of America.

History
- Operator: Disneyland Resort
- Builder: Todd Shipyards
- Status: In service

General characteristics
- Length: 110 feet (34 m) overall; 83 feet 6 inches (25.5 m) on deck
- Beam: 27 feet 3 inches (8.3 m)
- Height: 76 feet (23 m)
- Draft: 45 inches (1.1 m)
- Installed power: Detroit diesel engine (previously); Compressed natural gas (CNG) engine; Electric
- Propulsion: Two 30" diameter, 18" pitch standard ship's propellers (screws)
- Speed: 1.3 knots
- Capacity: ~300
- Crew: Two to four

The Sailing Ship Columbia is a full-scale replica of Columbia Rediviva, the first American ship to circumnavigate the globe. Located at the Disneyland park in Anaheim, California, US, the Columbia has operated in the park for more than fifty years. Passengers of the ship take a 12-minute trip around the Rivers of America. At night, the Columbia plays the role of Captain Hook's ship in riverfront performances of the park's nighttime show, Fantasmic!

== History ==
When Walt Disney decided that the Rivers of America needed more river traffic and wanted another large ship to join the Mark Twain, he asked Joe Fowler, who was Disneyland's construction supervisor and a former naval admiral, to suggest a historic sailing ship for inspiration. After examining every maritime museum in the country, Fowler recommended the first American sailing ship to go around the world: the Columbia Rediviva. However, there is only one known picture in existence of the original vessel. WED researchers used it, along with research materials from the Library of Congress, to design the Columbia.

Architect, artist, and marine expert Ray Wallace was commissioned in 1957 to work with Fowler in creating the construction plans, the original designs were sketched out on a napkin by Ray Wallace at a meeting to discuss the final design of the ship. Wallace would later be known for designing the Lady Washington, a replica of the original Columbia's tender ship, and prop ship for HMS Interceptor in Pirates of the Caribbean: Curse of the Black Pearl and as Captain Hook's ship in Once Upon a Time. The Columbia's masts, rigging, spars, and sails were constructed at Todd Shipyards, Los Angeles Division, San Pedro, California, where the Mark Twain's hull had been built a few years earlier. After Fowler told Disney that it was customary to put a silver dollar under each mast before it was set, Disney personally put one under each of the Columbia's three masts.

For the ship's christening on June 4, 1958, Fowler was dressed as a sailing captain of the 18th century, while the Mouseketeers appeared as his crew. Since then, the sailing ship Columbia has had many extensive refurbishments, but the only major change has been the addition of the crew quarters exhibit in 1964.

The Columbia was christened by Gretchen Campbell Richmond, wife of Alfred C. Richmond, Commandant of the United States Coast Guard (1954–1962).

A copy of the Columbia was planned for Magic Kingdom at Walt Disney World, but it was canceled and replaced with plans to build a second steamboat.

On January 11, 2016, the Sailing Ship Columbia, along with the other attractions and shows along the Rivers of America, closed temporarily for the construction of Star Wars: Galaxy's Edge. The ship reopened on July 29, 2017.

== Attraction description ==
Passengers wait for the 110-foot-long (34 m) ship, which departs every 25 minutes, inside a sheltered area called Frontier Landing, located in Frontierland. The waiting area for the 84-foot-tall (26 m) Columbia is shared with the Mark Twain Riverboat. Historic United States flags are displayed at the attraction's entrance.

Passengers board the full-scale replica of the original sailing ship Columbia by climbing steps, also known as the "brow", up onto the main deck. Once on board, they can visit a nautical museum below deck, which shows what life was like for the 1787 crew. In addition to the galley, pantry, dry stores, and sick bay, there are quarters for the crew, bosun and bosun's mate, first mate, captain, and surgeon.

Once the ship casts off, it begins its voyage around the Rivers of America. The ship, which has three masts and rigging but rarely unfurls its sails, is powered by a compressed natural gas engine (formerly a Marine Detroit Diesel 2-stroke). It runs along the same track as the Mark Twain, hidden by green dye in the water.

The captain provides a tongue-in-cheek running commentary as he calls orders to his crew, while recorded background music plays a selection of nautical songs, such as "Blow the Man Down". As the ship passes Fort Wilderness on Tom Sawyer Island, a Columbia cast member fires a 12-gauge blank from one of the ship's ten cannons. The Fort also had a cannon that used to fire back.

The Sailing Ship Columbia operates only on the park's busiest days, or when the Mark Twain is not operating. The attraction usually opens at 11am and closes at dusk. On evenings when Fantasmic! is being performed, the ship, which plays the role of Captain Hook's pirate ship in the show, will also close at dusk. In 2017-2023 incarnation of Fantasmic!, the ship served as Black Pearl. When the ship is not operating, it is docked at Fowler's Harbor, near the Haunted Mansion attraction.

== Accidents ==
On December 24, 1998, a cleat used to secure the ship to the dock tore loose, striking park visitors Luan Phi Dawson, 33, of Duvall, Washington, and his 43-year-old wife Lieu Thuy Vuong in the head, as their son and grandchild and other park visitors looked on. 30-year-old park employee Christine Carpenter of Anaheim, California was also injured. Dawson was declared brain-dead two days later at UCI Medical Center in Orange, California, when his life support system was disconnected. The ride reopened on June 28, 1999.

== Soundtrack ==
- "Show Narration", 3:25
- "Haul Boys Haul", 2:05
- "Oh Johnny Come to Hilo", 2:30
- "Song of the Fishes", 1:41
- "Drunken Sailor", 1:51
- "A Whale of a Tale", 1:44
- "An American Frigate", 2:08
- "Blow the Man Down", 2:12

Current songs (all vocals): "Blow the Man Down", "Clear the Track (Let the Bulgine Run)", "One More Day", "Rolling Home" and "Song of the Fishes".

== See also ==
- List of Disneyland attractions
- Mark Twain Riverboat

== Sources ==
- Bright, Randy (1987). Disneyland: Inside Story. New York: Harry N. Abrams, Inc. p. 141. ISBN 0-8109-0811-5.
