= Tom Sawyer Island =

Artificial island at Disney theme parks

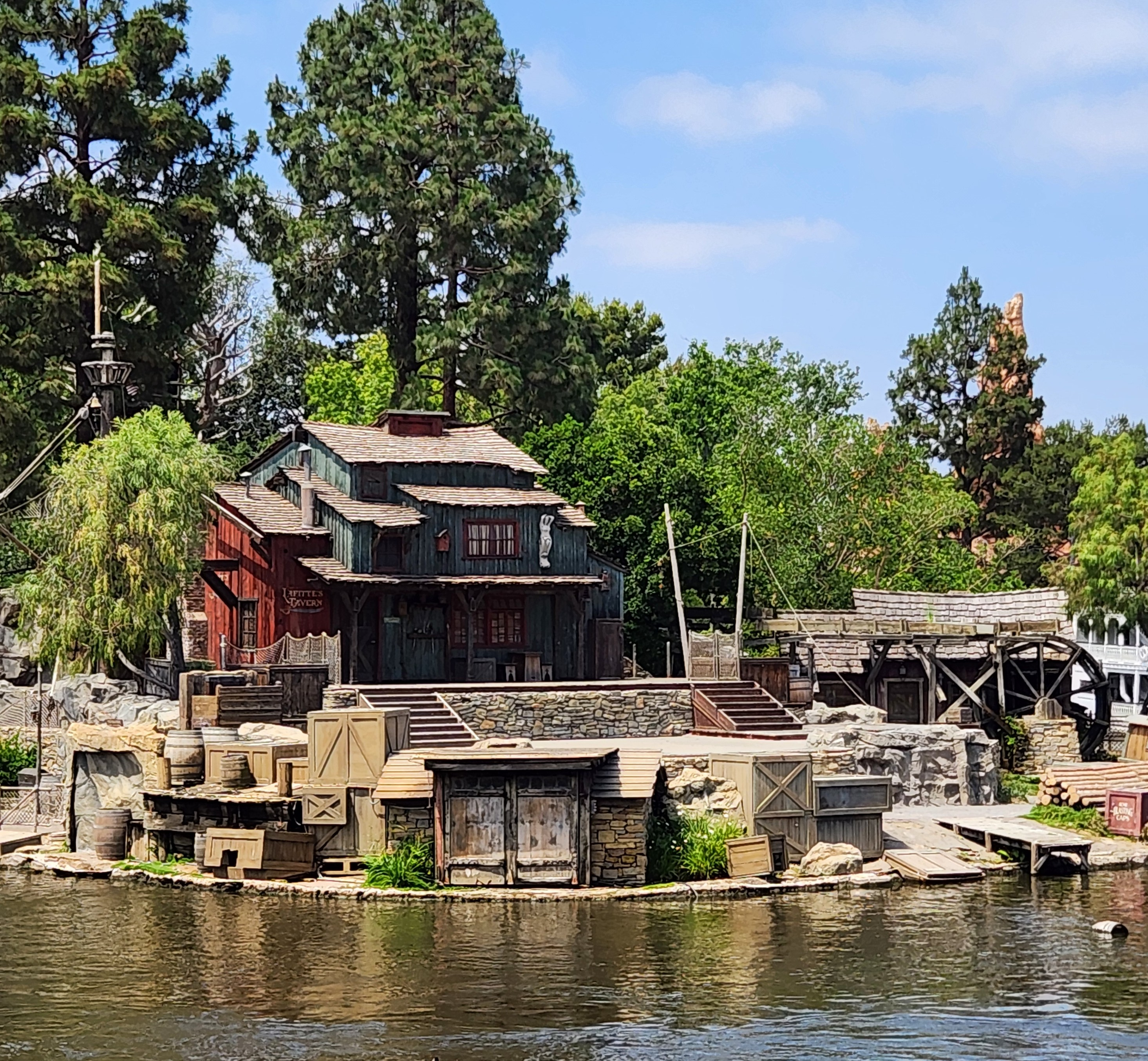
- Tom Sawyer Island at Disneyland

Disneyland
- Name: Tom Sawyer Island
- Area: Frontierland
- Coordinates: 33.8124°N 117.9213°W
- Status: Operating
- Opening date: June 16, 1956

Tokyo Disneyland
- Area: Westernland
- Coordinates: 35.6314°N 139.8836°E
- Status: Operating
- Opening date: April 15, 1983

Magic Kingdom
- Area: Frontierland
- Coordinates: 28.4197°N 81.5835°W
- Status: Closed
- Opening date: May 20, 1973
- Closing date: July 7, 2025
- Replaced by: Piston Peak National Park

Ride statistics
- Wheelchair accessible

Tom Sawyer Island is an artificial island surrounded by the Rivers of America at Disneyland and Tokyo Disneyland, and was formerly located at Magic Kingdom. The island contains structures and caves with references to Mark Twain characters from the novel The Adventures of Tom Sawyer, and provides interactive, climbing, and scenic opportunities. At Disneyland in 2007, the attraction was rethemed and expanded as Pirate's Lair on Tom Sawyer Island, adding references to Disney's Pirates of the Caribbean film series.

== History of Disneyland's Tom Sawyer Island ==
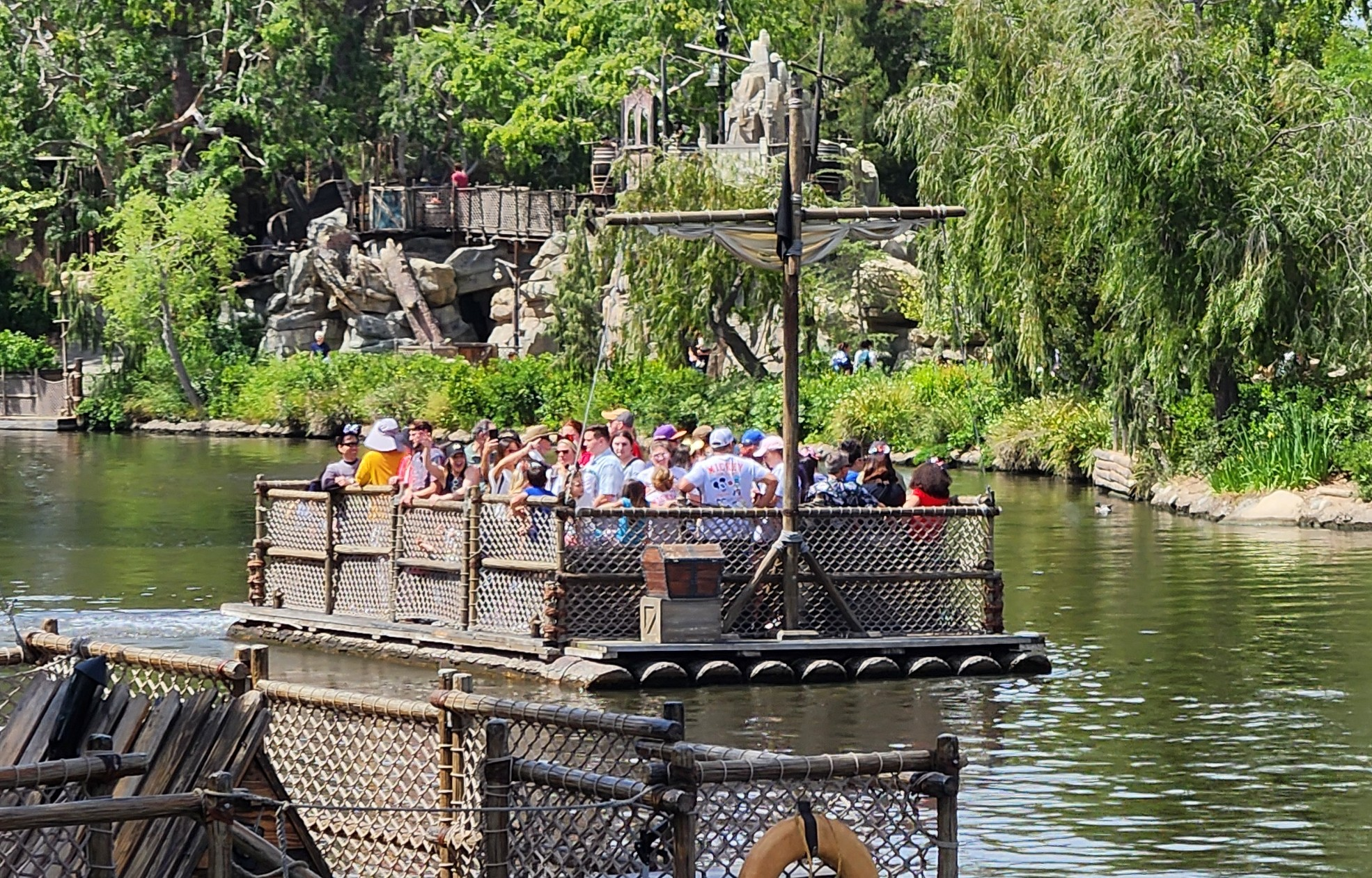
Tom Sawyer Island raft at Disneyland

The area opened in 1956, one year after the opening of Disneyland Park.

Prior to the debut of Fantasmic! in 1992, when the south end of the Island was re-built to facilitate the nighttime show, Tom Sawyer Island saw very little change. On May 25, 2007 the Island received major upgrades, new show elements, and a complete re-theming when it re-opened as Pirate's Lair on Tom Sawyer Island. The re-theming added characters and elements from and inspired by the Pirates of the Caribbean film series. A justification behind connecting the Tom Sawyer and pirate themes came in the form of a chapter from The Adventures of Tom Sawyer where Tom, Huck and Joe Harper go off to play pirates on a nearby island.

Pirate's Lair on Tom Sawyer Island's opening coincided with the theatrical release of Pirates of the Caribbean: At World's End.

On January 11, 2016, Pirate's Lair on Tom Sawyer Island, along with the other attractions and shows along the Rivers of America, closed temporarily for the construction of Star Wars: Galaxy's Edge. Pirate's Lair on Tom Sawyer Island reopened on June 16, 2017.

=== Incidents ===
- In January 2001, the mock rifles at Fort Wilderness were removed after a six-year-old girl lost part of a finger while playing with one.
- On April 22, 2023, the island was the site of a fire during a performance of Fantasmic! when the show's Audio-Animatronic dragon malfunctioned and erupted into flames.

=== Geography and features ===
Guests visit the island, surrounded by the Rivers of America, by traveling on a motorized raft which is piloted by a Disneyland cast member.

While aboard the Sailing Ship Columbia or Mark Twain Riverboat, Disneyland guests travel clockwise around the island. Looking to starboard, they can see the many areas and adventure opportunities of the island. To port, they see Disneyland itself and from time to time will see a Disneyland Railroad train passing by. At the northern end of the island, inaccessible to guests, is the Settler's Cabin, a cabin that used to burn by spewing real fire from its roof. Today, the cabin is no longer burning.

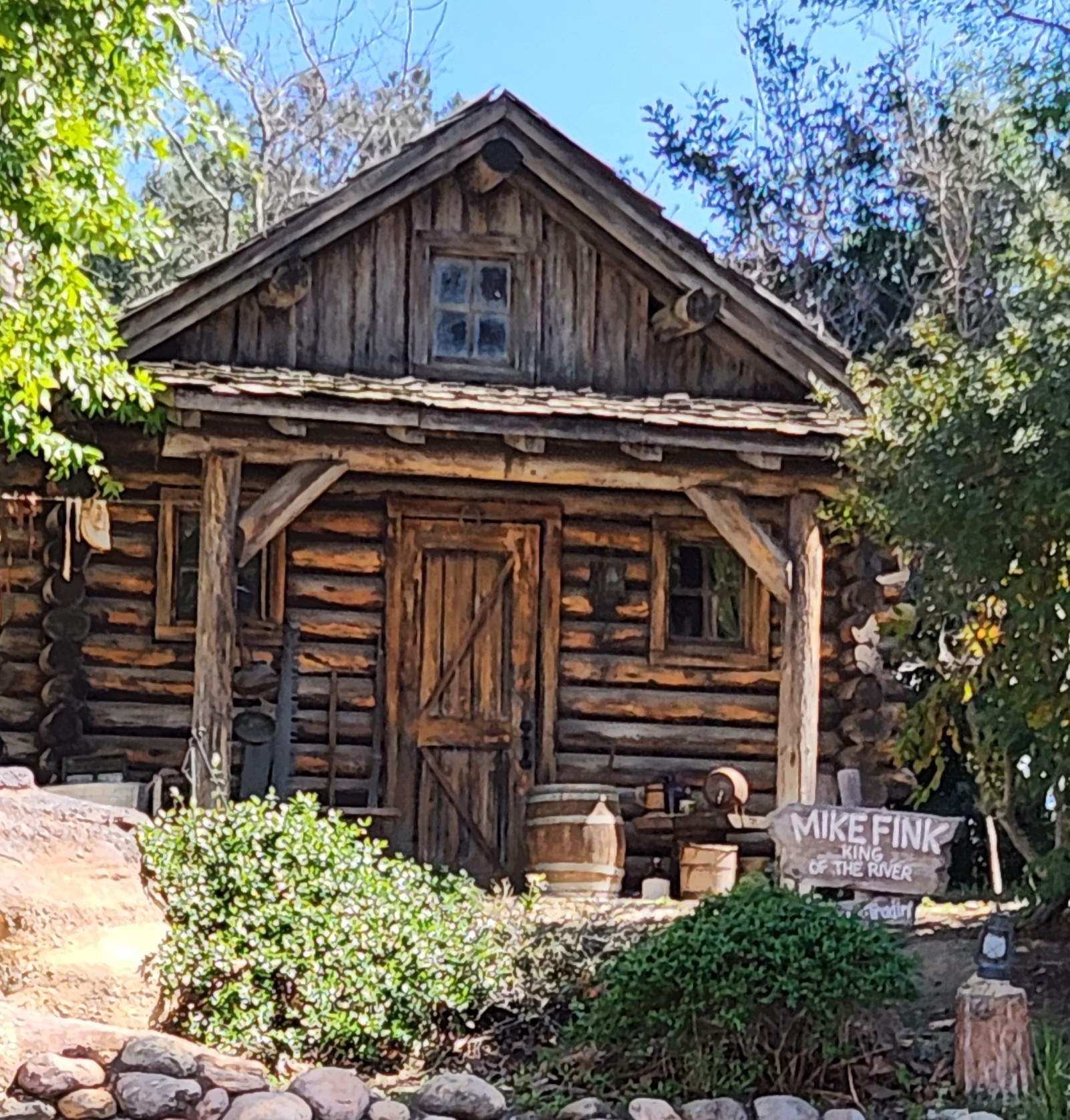
Mike Fink's cabin at Disneyland

Over the years, there have been theme changes to the cabin: originally, it was said to have been set ablaze by a hostile native tribe. This storyline was eventually changed to having been the home of a moonshiner who had fallen into a drunken stupor when he should have been minding his still; later, the fire was described (at least in the Mark Twain steamboat narration) as the result of unspecified carelessness, and as having left not only the cabin's owner homeless, but also some of the wildlife in a nearby tree. The fire was later turned off. In 2007, the outward appearance of the house was cleaned up and all fire damage was removed, making it a regular homestead along the waters. The narration (and dialogue from within the cabin) indicated that it was the home of Mike Fink, keelboater and self-proclaimed "King of the River." When the island reopened in July 2017, the cabin was removed due to the shortening of the island for Star Wars: Galaxy's Edge. A new cabin was built on the north-most tip of the island.

The most prominent structure on the island, viewable from Frontierland, Adventureland and New Orleans Square, is Lafitte's Tavern, which was formerly Harper's Mill.

==== The Landing ====
The Landing on the island consists of a small dock to which the Rafts to Tom Sawyer Island travel from the mainland. Guests exit the raft here, and then guests waiting in the dock's small switchback queue enter the raft to travel back to the mainland.

==== Lafitte's Tavern - Pirate Point ====
Lafitte's Tavern is the former Harper's Mill which has been part of Tom Sawyer Island since its inception. Guests cannot actually enter the Tavern.

There was small pirate stunt show that took place on the stage area in front of the Tavern, and between shows The Bilge Rats, a band of pirate musicians, entertained guests with songs.

The Tavern houses a lot of show equipment and elements for the nighttime show, Fantasmic!.

==== W. Turner Blacksmith ====
W. Turner Blacksmith features props and show elements reminiscent of the blacksmith shop from Pirates of the Caribbean: The Curse of the Black Pearl in which the character of Will Turner is introduced.

==== Dead Man's Grotto ====
Formerly Injun Joe's Cave (featuring a bridge over a bottomless pit along with wind and moan sounds), Dead Man's Grotto infuses more of the Pirates of the Caribbean film mythology into Tom Sawyer Island. The cave features several prominent interactive elements that feature state-of-the-art lighting and sound technology. The first thing guests will note is that Captain Jack Sparrow has left a note of caution for explorers above the entry. The first major interactive feature guests will encounter is the Chest of Davy Jones from the Pirates of the Caribbean films. Upon touching the chest, lighting will change, Davy Jones' disembodied voice will utter words of warning, and guests will be able to feel the heartbeat of Jones' heart from within the chest. Skeletons of previous explorers and pirates litter the pits of the cave.

Additional features in the cave include "pop-up" gags featuring Pintel and Ragetti from the Pirates of the Caribbean films who are guarding cursed treasure as well as other effects featuring disappearing treasure and a genie in a bottle guarding treasure.

The end of the Dead Man's Grotto cave features an Audio-Animatronics figure of a cursed pirate prisoner. The pirate's cursed state is in reference to the first Pirates film, but is not representative of any specific character or scene. The cursed pirate comes alive in seemingly random intervals, warning onlookers of the danger of the cursed treasure, asking for help, or sometimes dealing threats. A small, high-up window in the prisoner's cell will occasionally reveal a full moon through the clouds in a dark night sky, which transforms the prisoner into his cursed, undead form.

==== Smuggler's Cove ====
Smuggler's Cove is a remnant of the original Tom Sawyer Island, however, it was updated for the Pirate's Lair makeover. The area now appears to be the site of the wreck of a small sailing vessel which was carrying much pirate loot. Smuggler's Cove features several interactive play features including:

- The Capstan Wheel: When turned by guests, the capstan wheel hoists a treasure chest out of the watery wreckage, with the skeletal remains of a pirate still holding onto his beloved treasure.
- Bilge Pumps: Bilge pumps allow guests to pump out some of the water from the flooded ship, revealing skeletons of long-dead pirates still guarding their treasure in their watery grave.
- Bone Cage: The bone cage serves as a photo-op for guests and is a smaller replica of the bone cages featured in the Pirates of the Caribbean: Dead Man's Chest feature film.
- Suspension Bridge: The suspension bridge is an element from the original Tom Sawyer Island, and crosses overhead, above the bilge pumps and bone cage feature.
- Pontoon Bridge: Rocking and splashing in the water, the pontoon bridge crosses the water for daring explorers near the capstan wheel wreckage.

==== Castle Rock ====
Castle Rock is a large rock structure which features stationary telescopes, giving guests views of specific scenery and points of interest back on the Frontierland and Bayou Country mainland. The area was mostly unchanged during the Pirate's Lair re-theme, and features a couple of hidden pirate chests and themed barrels bearing the East India Trading Company stamp.

==== Pirate's Den - Shipwreck ====
That official description of the Shipwreck alludes to the Kraken creature featured in the Pirates of the Caribbean films. The shipwreck is a minor feature, being a small walk-through feature with no interactive elements. Inside the Shipwreck, Davy Jones' voice can be heard whispering warnings to those who inspect the wreckage. The inside of the wreckage features more LED lighting design, similar to what is seen on a larger scale in Dead Man's Grotto. The wreckage is littered with barnacles, a skeleton, weaponry, and other features from a pirate ship.

==== The Captain's Treasure ====
The Captain's Treasure is a large mound of loot at the furthest end of the Island accessible to guests. The area is a photo-op in which guests can pose with the mound of treasure, and often Captain Jack Sparrow can be found posing for photos with guests.

==== Tom & Huck's Tree House ====
The Tree House was a remnant of the original Tom Sawyer Island and was mostly unchanged during the re-theme, except for a couple of small pirate additions themed to appear as though Tom and Huck made them in the tree house. When the island reopened after its July 2017 refurbishment, the stairs up the tree house were removed and guests can no longer climb up the tree house.

==== Fort Wilderness ====
Fort Wilderness is an original 1956 feature of Tom Sawyer Island. Previously a guest-accessible feature of the island, Fort Wilderness was closed after the island re-opened from a refurbishment in 2003. In 2007 Disney demolished the original 1956 Fort Wilderness due to long-neglected termite and weather damage. A new Fort Wilderness was constructed; however, instead of being constructed with authentic hand-hewn logs, it was built with standard milled lumber. The new Fort Wilderness is not accessible to guests.

== Tom Sawyer Islands in other Disney theme parks ==
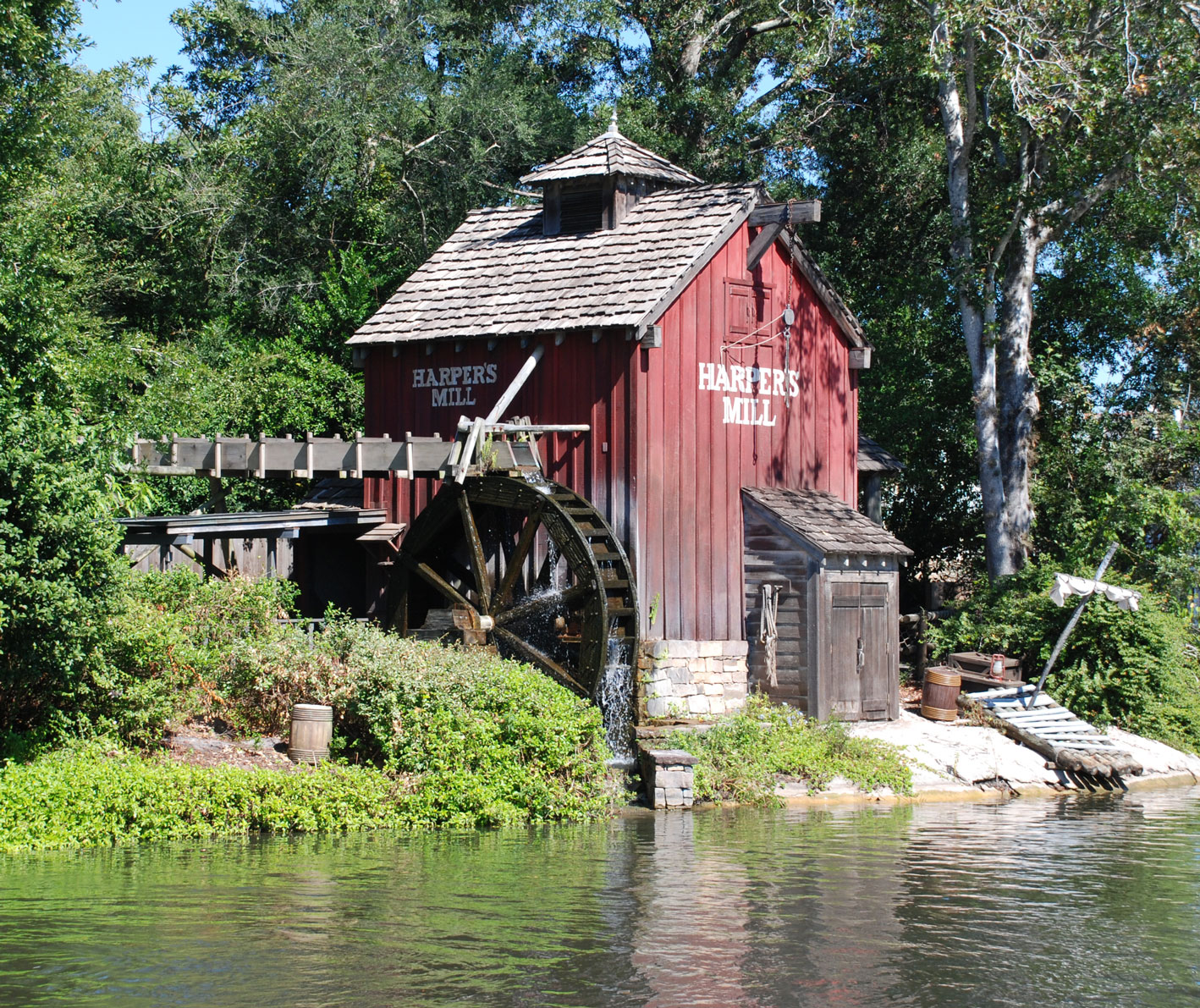
A view of Magic Kingdom's Tom Sawyer Island in 2006. Tom Sawyer Island operated at Magic Kingdom from 1973 to 2025

Tokyo Disneyland has its own version of Tom Sawyer Island, still known by the original name. Disneyland Park Paris and Hong Kong Disneyland have islands, but with alternate themes. In Disneyland Paris, Big Thunder Mountain Railroad occupies the island. In Hong Kong Disneyland, the island is occupied by Tarzan's Treehouse, which is in Adventureland in a similar location.

Magic Kingdom in Florida previously had its own version of Tom Sawyer Island, which was closed in 2025 to be replaced by an area themed to the American wilderness from Pixar's Cars franchise called Piston Peak National Park.

== See also ==
- List of Disneyland attractions
- List of Tokyo Disneyland attractions
- Pirates of the Caribbean (franchise)
