= Fantasmic! =

Nighttime show at Disney theme parks

Disneyland
- Area: Frontierland
- Coordinates: 33.8117216°N 117.921144°W
- Status: Operating
- Cost: $30 million (equivalent to $68,828,551 in 2025)
- Opening date: May 13, 1992

Disney's Hollywood Studios
- Area: Sunset Boulevard
- Coordinates: 28.3612559°N 81.558249°W
- Status: Operating
- Opening date: October 15, 1998

Tokyo DisneySea
- Area: Mediterranean Harbor
- Coordinates: 35.626199°N 139.886346°E
- Status: Closed
- Cost: ¥3 billion (approximately US$36 million)
- Opening date: April 28, 2011
- Closing date: February 29, 2020
- Replaced: BraviSEAmo!
- Replaced by: Believe! Sea of Dreams

Ride statistics
- Attraction type: Nighttime show
- Theme: Disney films
- Music: Bruce Healey; Don L. Harper (Tokyo DisneySea version)
- Audience capacity: 9,900 (Florida; 7,900 seated and 2,000 standing) per show
- Duration: 25–29 minutes
- Original cost: $30 million (Disneyland; $68.8 million in 2025 dollars)
- Created by: Barnette Ricci
- Assistive listening available
- Closed captioning available

Fantasmic! is a nighttime spectacular presented at Disneyland in Anaheim, California, and Disney's Hollywood Studios at Walt Disney World in Florida. A third version operated at Tokyo DisneySea in Japan from 2011 until 2020. The productions center on Mickey Mouse and the power of his imagination, combining live performers and Disney characters with fountains, pyrotechnics, lighting, lasers and animated imagery projected onto screens of mist.

The original production debuted at Disneyland in 1992. It was conceived by Disney show director Barnette Ricci, who developed the concept of combining Disney animation projected onto mist screens with fountains, lighting, lasers, pyrotechnics, watercraft and live performers. Ricci wrote the show's script and the lyrics to its original song, "Imagination", while composer Bruce Healey created the score and rescored music from Disney films for the production.

A second version opened at the then-Disney-MGM Studios, now Disney's Hollywood Studios, in 1998. Tokyo DisneySea introduced a substantially different harbor production in 2011, replacing BraviSEAmo!. The Tokyo production ended when the resort closed during the COVID-19 pandemic, while the Disneyland and Hollywood Studios versions later resumed with revised sequences and effects.

== Concept and development ==
Ricci was asked to develop a production that would make greater use of Disneyland's Rivers of America, which she considered an underused entertainment venue. During research into water-based effects, her team obtained information about mist screens and received a demonstration reel from a French company showing film projected onto a water screen. Ricci developed the idea of projecting Disney animation onto the screens and combining the projections with fountains, lighting, lasers, pyrotechnics, black-light effects and performers aboard watercraft.

Ricci wrote the script and adapted and re-edited sequences from Disney animated films to work with Healey's musical arrangements. Healey rescored music from the films and supplied the show's original score, while Ricci wrote the lyrics to "Imagination".

The show's name was selected shortly before its debut. Then-Disneyland president Jack Lindquist later recalled that he and Disney chairman and chief executive Michael Eisner were discussing possible names approximately two months before opening when the word "phantasmagoria" suggested the eventual title Fantasmic!. Lindquist subsequently took the name to members of Disneyland's advertising and art departments, where the first logo concept was developed.

Construction required substantial alterations to the Rivers of America and Tom Sawyer Island. The river was drained for several months, while part of the island was rebuilt to provide a stage, special-effects facilities and a backstage marina for the show's barges. During the project's development and construction, Dale Burner directed Disneyland's Facilities, Engineering and Construction Division. Burner was identified as director of the division in July 1991 and was promoted to vice president of Facilities, Engineering and Construction in December 1991, while construction of Fantasmic! was underway. The original 22-minute production used 51 live performers in addition to animation, large-scale props, lasers, pyrotechnics, fog and other theatrical effects; nearly 350 waterproof costumes were created for the show.

The cost of the project was not publicly fixed in contemporary reporting. In March 1992, the Los Angeles Times reported that the price had risen to approximately $30 million, about twice the original estimate, as the project developed from a seasonal entertainment offering into a large-scale attraction.

== Disneyland ==
=== Synopsis ===
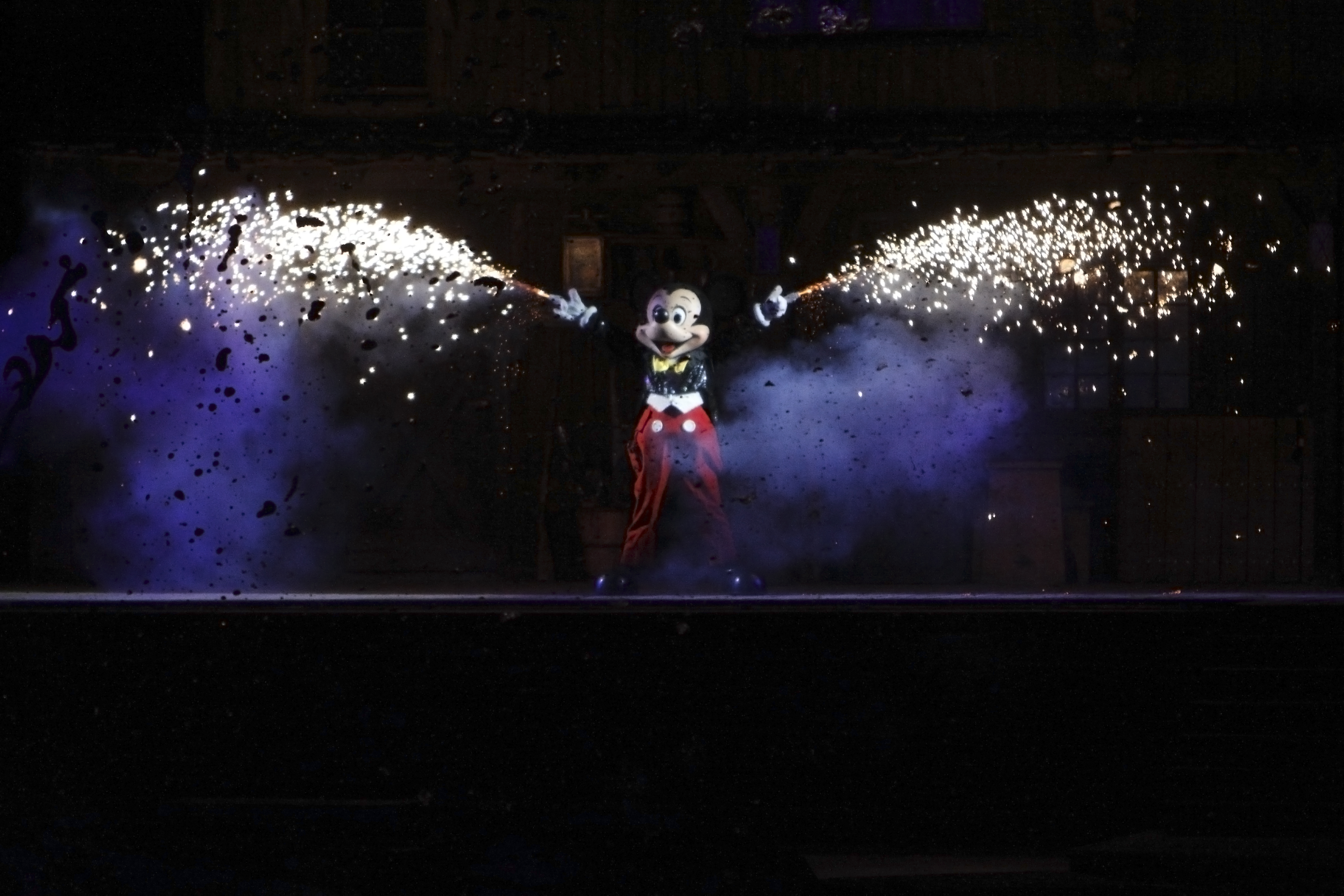
Mickey Mouse surrounded by pyrotechnic effects during the show at Disneyland

The Disneyland production is staged on the Rivers of America and Tom Sawyer Island, primarily facing Frontierland and New Orleans Square. Mickey enters a dream in which he controls water, light and other elements through his imagination. Scenes from Fantasia are projected onto mist screens as fountains, lighting and pyrotechnic effects accompany the music.

A succession of Disney stories follows, combining projected animation with live performers, puppets and floating units. The production incorporates material from films including The Jungle Book, The Lion King, Dumbo and Aladdin. A live-action sequence based on Peter Pan features Peter, Wendy and the Lost Boys confronting Captain Hook aboard the Sailing Ship Columbia.

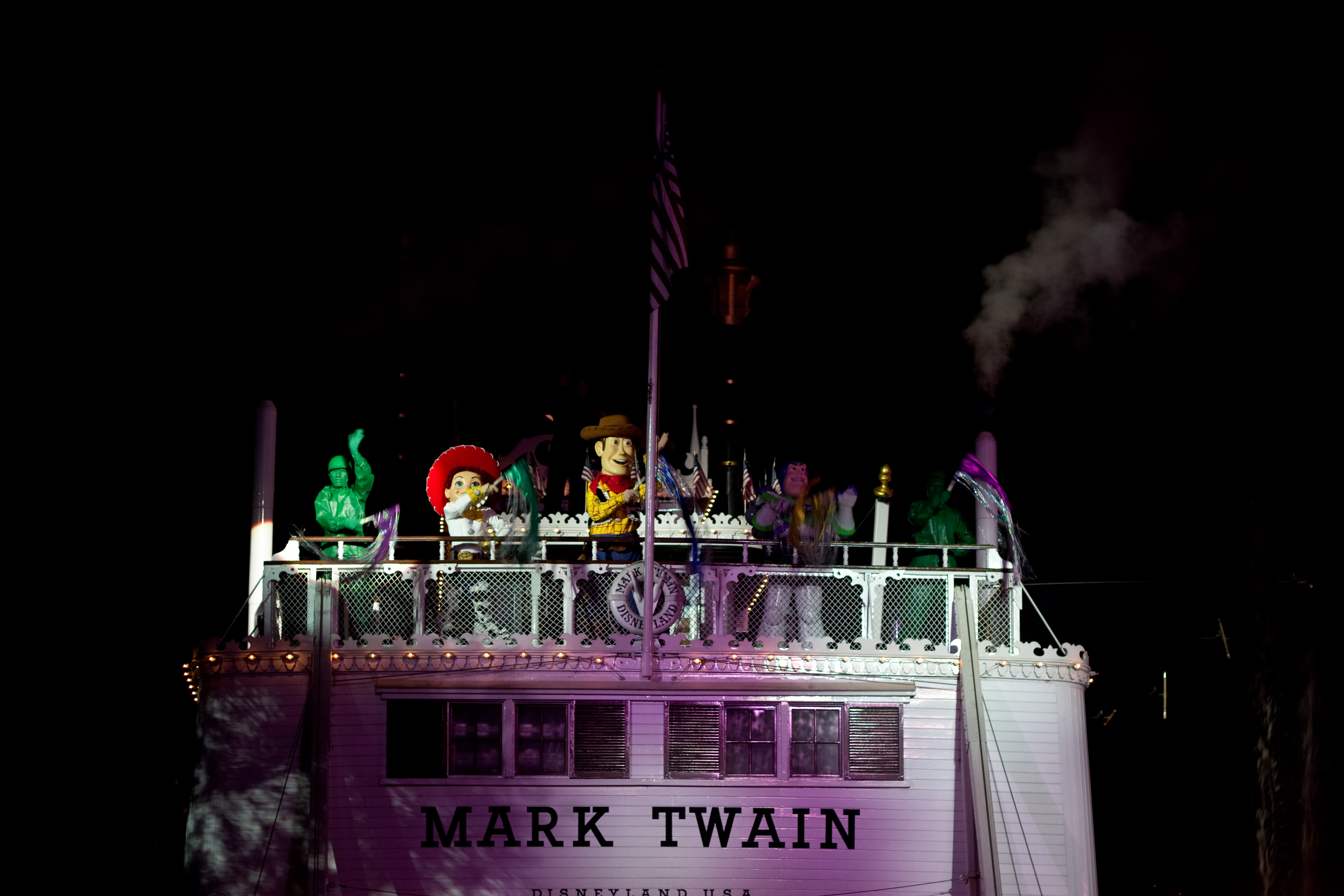
Disney characters aboard the Mark Twain Riverboat during the finale at Disneyland

The dream eventually becomes a nightmare when the Magic Mirror and Disney villains challenge Mickey. Maleficent appears during the climax and rises above the stage while setting portions of the river surface ablaze. Mickey uses the power of his imagination to defeat the villains.

The finale features Disney characters aboard the Mark Twain Riverboat, including Mickey in an appearance based on Steamboat Willie. Mickey subsequently reappears as the Sorcerer's Apprentice and conducts a final sequence of fountains, lighting and pyrotechnics.

== Production history ==
From left to right, Dragon scene differences that were used differently in the Disneyland version.

Fantasmic! debuted at Disneyland on May 13, 1992. The original production incorporated three mist screens, the Mark Twain, the Columbia, floating units, mechanical figures, fire effects and approximately 50 costumed cast members. Demand exceeded Disney's expectations; guests frequently claimed viewing locations hours before performances and congestion developed around the Rivers of America. Disney subsequently terraced portions of the viewing area to improve sight lines and pedestrian flow.

A substantial update debuted in 2009. The revised production added new versions of several character effects, including Flotsam and Jetsam from The Little Mermaid, Captain Hook's crocodile and a new full-bodied, fire-breathing Maleficent dragon. The new dragon was originally intended to debut with the updated show in June but was delayed by mechanical problems. It made its public debut in September 2009. The dragon experienced another major technical problem during a performance in August 2010 and was temporarily removed for repairs.

The show closed on January 10, 2016, along with other attractions around the Rivers of America as construction proceeded on Star Wars: Galaxy's Edge. It returned in July 2017 with new mist screens, projection technology and scenes. The revised production added material from Aladdin and The Lion King, incorporated projection mapping onto the island scenery and replaced the longstanding Peter Pan sequence aboard the Columbia with one based on the Pirates of the Caribbean films.

Performances were suspended when Disneyland closed during the COVID-19 pandemic. Disneyland reopened on April 30, 2021, after a closure of more than a year, but Fantasmic! remained unavailable. Disney announced that the show would return on May 28, 2022, coinciding with its 30th anniversary.

On April 22, 2023, the Maleficent dragon caught fire during a performance. The show was stopped and nearby areas were evacuated; the Anaheim Fire Department reported no injuries. Fantasmic! subsequently entered an extended hiatus while Disney redesigned the climax.

The show returned on May 24, 2024. The revised production eliminated the former full-size Maleficent dragon and introduced a new confrontation in which Maleficent rises approximately 35 feet above the stage while lighting, projection and pyrotechnic effects accompany the battle with Sorcerer Mickey. The refurbishment also restored the Peter Pan sequence aboard the Columbia, replacing the Pirates of the Caribbean sequence introduced in 2017 and adding Wendy and the Lost Boys to the scene. The current production runs approximately 25 minutes.

== Disney's Hollywood Studios ==
=== Synopsis ===
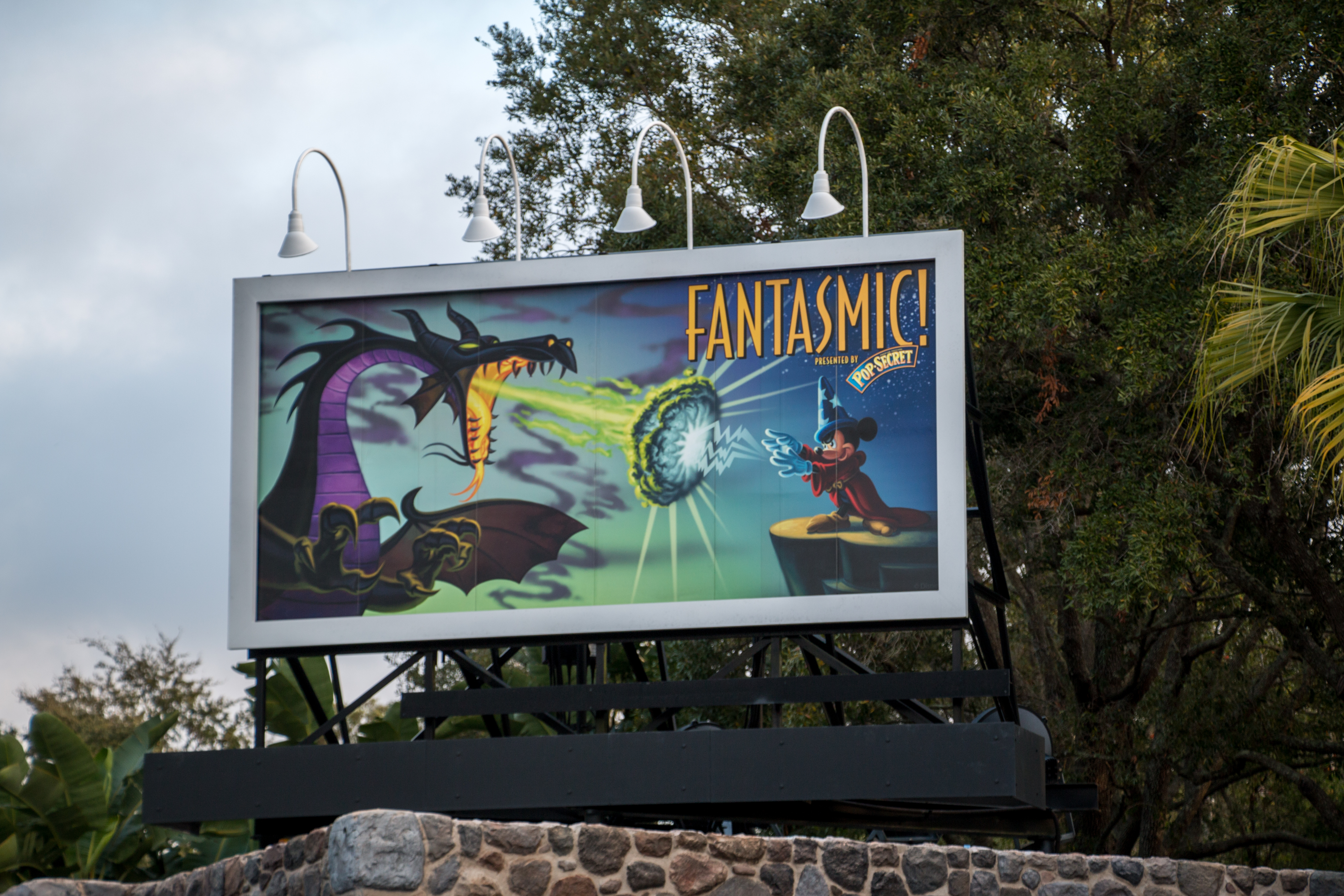
A ''Fantasmic!'' billboard at Disney's Hollywood Studios depicting Sorcerer Mickey confronting Maleficent in dragon form

The Disney's Hollywood Studios production takes place in the Hollywood Hills Amphitheater. As in the Disneyland production, Mickey dreams that he is the Sorcerer's Apprentice and gains the ability to control water, color and other elements through his imagination.

Scenes from Fantasia and other Disney animated films are presented through live performance and imagery projected onto mist screens. The current production includes a heroes sequence featuring Pocahontas, Mulan, Aladdin, Elsa and Moana. The sequence combines live performers and stunts with material from their respective films.

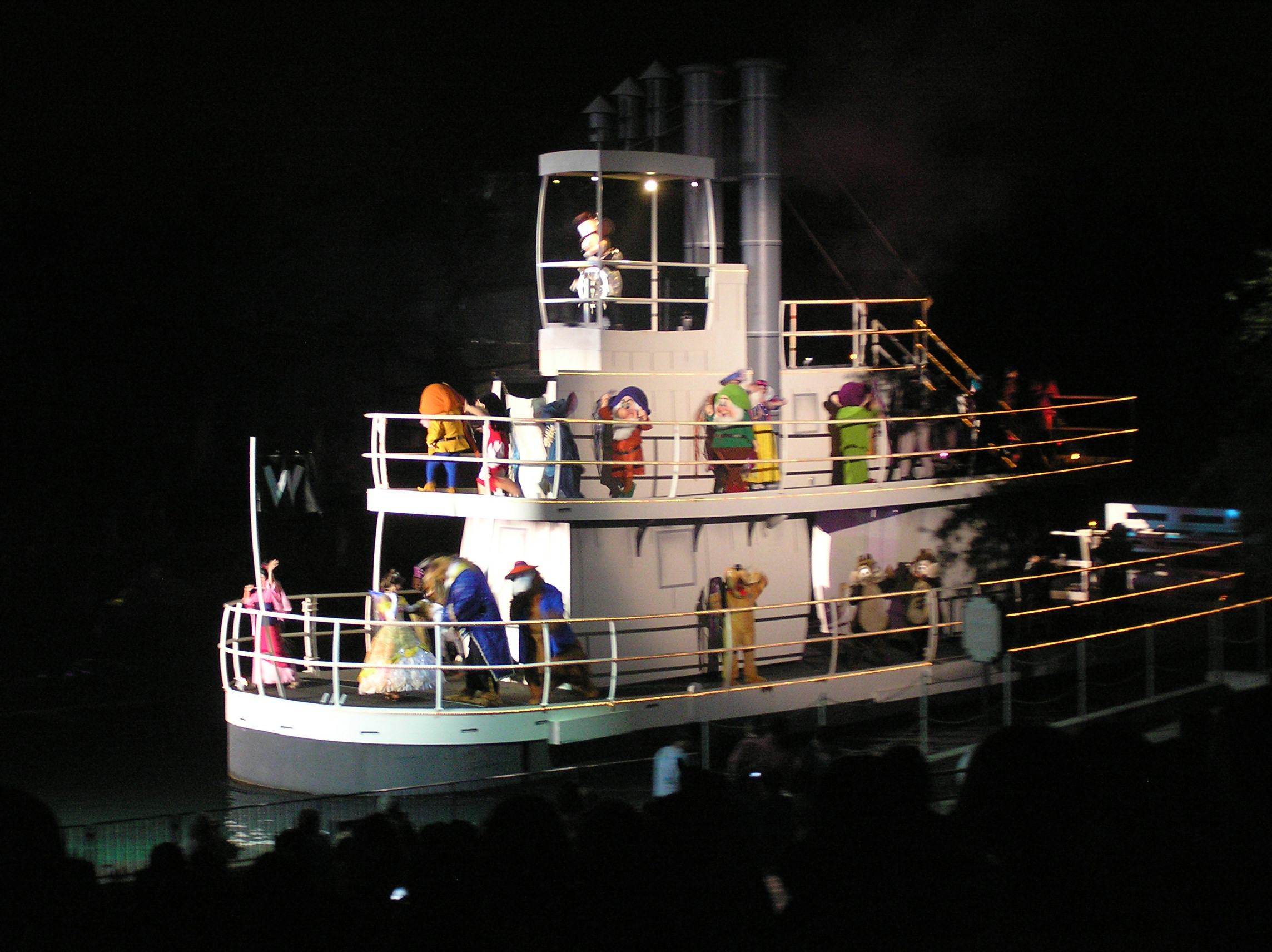
Disney characters aboard the ''Steamboat Willie'' riverboat during the finale at Disney's Hollywood Studios

The dream becomes a nightmare as Disney villains take control. The sequence culminates with Maleficent transforming into a dragon approximately 40 feet tall. Mickey ultimately defeats the villains and restores his dream.

The finale brings Disney characters onto a riverboat modeled on the vessel from Steamboat Willie, followed by Mickey's reappearance as the Sorcerer's Apprentice for a final sequence of water, lighting and pyrotechnic effects.

=== Production history ===
A new version of Fantasmic! opened at the then-Disney-MGM Studios on October 15, 1998. Unlike Disneyland's production, which incorporated the existing Rivers of America and Tom Sawyer Island, the Florida production was presented in a new Hollywood Hills Amphitheater built for the show.

Performances ceased when Walt Disney World's theme parks closed during the COVID-19 pandemic in March 2020. Walt Disney World's parks began reopening in July 2020, but Fantasmic! remained closed for more than two additional years.

The show returned on November 3, 2022. Disney introduced a new heroes sequence featuring Aladdin, Elsa, Pocahontas, Moana and Mulan and upgraded the production's lasers, lighting and sound systems. The revised show continues to operate at Disney's Hollywood Studios.

== Tokyo DisneySea ==
=== Synopsis ===
The Tokyo DisneySea production retained the basic premise of Mickey as the Sorcerer's Apprentice creating a world through his imagination, but was staged across Mediterranean Harbor rather than at a stationary island stage or amphitheater. Disney described the production as a nighttime story centered on Mickey's imaginative world.

Mickey's imagination creates a succession of Disney characters and animated scenes around the harbor using fountains, projections, floating show elements and pyrotechnics. The dream is eventually disrupted by Disney villains, leading to a confrontation between Mickey and the forces attempting to control his imagination. Mickey prevails and the production concludes with a harbor-wide finale.

=== Production history ===
Oriental Land Company announced Fantasmic! as a new nighttime production for Tokyo DisneySea replacing BraviSEAmo!, with an investment of approximately ¥3 billion (approximately US$36 million). The show debuted on April 28, 2011, the same day Tokyo DisneySea reopened following a closure caused by the Great East Japan Earthquake.

Tokyo Disney Resort announced in 2018 that the production would conclude on March 25, 2020. The planned final performance did not occur because Tokyo Disneyland and Tokyo DisneySea closed beginning February 29, 2020, in response to the COVID-19 pandemic.

The production did not return after the parks reopened. Oriental Land Company later introduced Believe! Sea of Dreams as a new nighttime spectacular in Mediterranean Harbor on November 11, 2022.

== Music ==
The original score for Fantasmic! was created by Bruce Healey. Barnette Ricci adapted and re-edited animation from Disney films around Healey's arrangements, which incorporated rescored music from the films into a new musical framework. Ricci also wrote the lyrics to the show's original song, "Imagination".

Music from Fantasmic! was included on the third disc of the 2015 Walt Disney Records release The Legacy Collection: Disneyland. The three-disc collection was produced and compiled by Randy Thornton as part of Disneyland's 60th-anniversary releases.

== Reception ==
The original Disneyland production received favorable contemporary reviews. In a May 1992 review for the Los Angeles Times, animation critic Charles Solomon wrote that the production lived up to its extensive promotion and praised the combination of animation, performers and large-scale theatrical effects, particularly the climactic dragon sequence.

The show also attracted substantial crowds shortly after opening. In June 1992, the Los Angeles Times reported that guests were waiting hours in advance for preferred viewing locations and that Disneyland considered Fantasmic! one of its principal attractions that summer. Disney's historical account similarly states that attendance exceeded expectations and initially produced substantial pedestrian congestion around the Rivers of America, contributing to the later terracing of the viewing area.

Reviewing the 2017 refurbishment, the Los Angeles Times highlighted the new projection-mapping technology as one of the most prominent improvements while noting the production's effort to introduce newer films without abandoning its central story about Mickey's imagination. Coverage of the 2024 return likewise emphasized the show's continued combination of live theater, Disney animation and large-scale technical effects, while noting the restoration of the Peter Pan sequence and the absence of the former Maleficent dragon.

== See also ==
- World of Color
