= Dorothea Holt Redmond =

- Born: Dorothea Holt; May 18, 1910; Los Angeles, California
- Died: February 27, 2009 (aged 98); Hollywood Hills, Los Angeles, California
- Occupation(s): Illustrator, production designer
- Spouse: Harry Redmond, Jr. (1940–2009)

Dorothea Holt Redmond (May 18, 1910 – February 27, 2009) was an illustrator and production designer noted for her work on Alfred Hitchcock films. Known as the first woman production designer, Redmond entered the industry in 1938. She worked on more than 30 films, including Gone with the Wind and The Ten Commandments, as well as seven Hitchcock productions, among them Rebecca, Rear Window and To Catch a Thief.

She was born in Los Angeles on May 18, 1910, to Mary and Harry Holt, who was a co-owner Western Lithograph Co. She attended the University of Southern California, where she studied architecture and was awarded a Bachelor of Fine Arts degree in 1933. She attended what is now the Art Center College of Design, and was awarded a degree in illustration in 1936, and later taught at the school.

== Motion pictures ==
She was hired by Selznick International Pictures in 1938, making her what the Los Angeles Times reported that year as the first woman to work in the "heretofore exclusively male field" of motion-picture production design. Out of resentment, male co-workers demanded that she work in a walled-off area separated from theirs.

Tania Modleski, a professor of English at the University of Southern California, emphasized how Redmond was responsible for influencing the German Expressionist aesthetic that Hitchcock was credited with, and that Redmond was widely considered one of the most talented illustrators in the film industry.

Redmond's illustrations would be used by Hitchcock and his art directors to define the tone of a scene for cameramen and other crew members. The 2007 book Casting a Shadow described how her renderings of a sequence in Hitchcock's 1943 film Shadow of a Doubt were influential in adding suspense by adding an element of threat to a quiet town.

Redmond's daughter recounted how "She just loved his personality and his taste" and that Hitchcock was "one of her very favorite people to work with". In 2008, the Academy of Motion Picture Arts and Sciences presented an exhibit titled Casting a Shadow: Creating the Alfred Hitchcock Film, that showed how Hitchcock worked with the other professionals on the set in his movie, with details of how he collaborated with Redmond on seven of his films such as the 1940 movie Rebecca, 1954's Rear Window and the 1955 film To Catch a Thief.

On January 31, 2016, Dorothea Holt Redmond will be inducted into the Art Directors Guild Hall of Fame in a ceremony to take place at the 20th Annual Excellence in Production Design Awards at the Beverly Hilton Hotel.

== Architecture ==
Redmond worked with the architectural firm of William Pereira and Charles Luckman. There, she did designs for interiors of Los Angeles International Airport and the Los Angeles County Museum of Art. She also helped to design the Seattle Space Needle.

=== Work with Walt Disney ===
She was hired by what is now Walt Disney Imagineering in 1966. There she helped design portions of Disneyland and the Walt Disney World Resort, including a residence in New Orleans Square intended for Walt Disney himself. The area was used as a gallery after Disney's death in 1966, but the space above the Pirates of the Caribbean attraction was converted into an apartment called the Disneyland Dream Suite based on her original design that has been used by randomly selected guests at the resort since January 2008. She also designed many other aspects of the stores and eateries in New Orleans Square.

She designed Fantasyland at Disney World in Florida, as well as portions of Main Street and mosaic murals in the archway of Cinderella Castle that were implemented there and in Tokyo Disneyland.

In fall 2008 she was honored by the firm's Disney Legends program, honoring her achievements on behalf of The Walt Disney Company. Marty Sklar described how "Her watercolor sketches were extraordinary place-making". An exhibit of her work opened at the company's Information Research Center in Glendale, California.

== Personal life ==
Holt met her future husband, Harry Redmond, Jr., at Selznick International Pictures studio during the late 1930s. She was designing the pre-production interior sets for Gone With The Wind and Rebecca, while Redmond was working for David O. Selznick on the set of The Prisoner of Zenda at the time of their meeting. The couple married in 1940. Together, they designed and constructed a home in the Hollywood Hills based on a design that she completed with her husband after the original architect had died.

Holt Redmond died at age 98 on February 27, 2009, due to congestive heart failure at her home in the Hollywood Hills.

Her husband Harry Redmond, died on May 23, 2011, at age 101.
