= Captain Jack's (restaurant) =

Restaurant at Disneyland Paris

Coordinates: 48.8734°N 2.7724°E

Captain Jack's - Restaurant des Pirates, or simply Captain Jack's, is a full-service restaurant in the Adventureland area of Disneyland Park at Disneyland Resort Paris. It is based on Disneyland's Blue Bayou Restaurant.

Although seated in a large, enclosed structure, diners experience an illusion that mimics being located on a Caribbean beach in an outdoor restaurant at nighttime. This effect is achieved through the use of a dark ceiling and special lighting, as well as sound and visual effects. Diners hear the chirping of crickets and croaking of frogs and they see the glow of fireflies.

The restaurant is named after the character Jack Sparrow from the Pirates of the Caribbean film series. The water stream that runs by the diners in the restaurant carries boats from the Pirates of the Caribbean attraction.

In 2017 the restaurant was renamed Captain Jack's from its previous name, The Blue Lagoon.
