= The Disney Gallery =

Walk-through exhibit space at Disneyland

Coordinates: 33.8101°N 117.9185°W

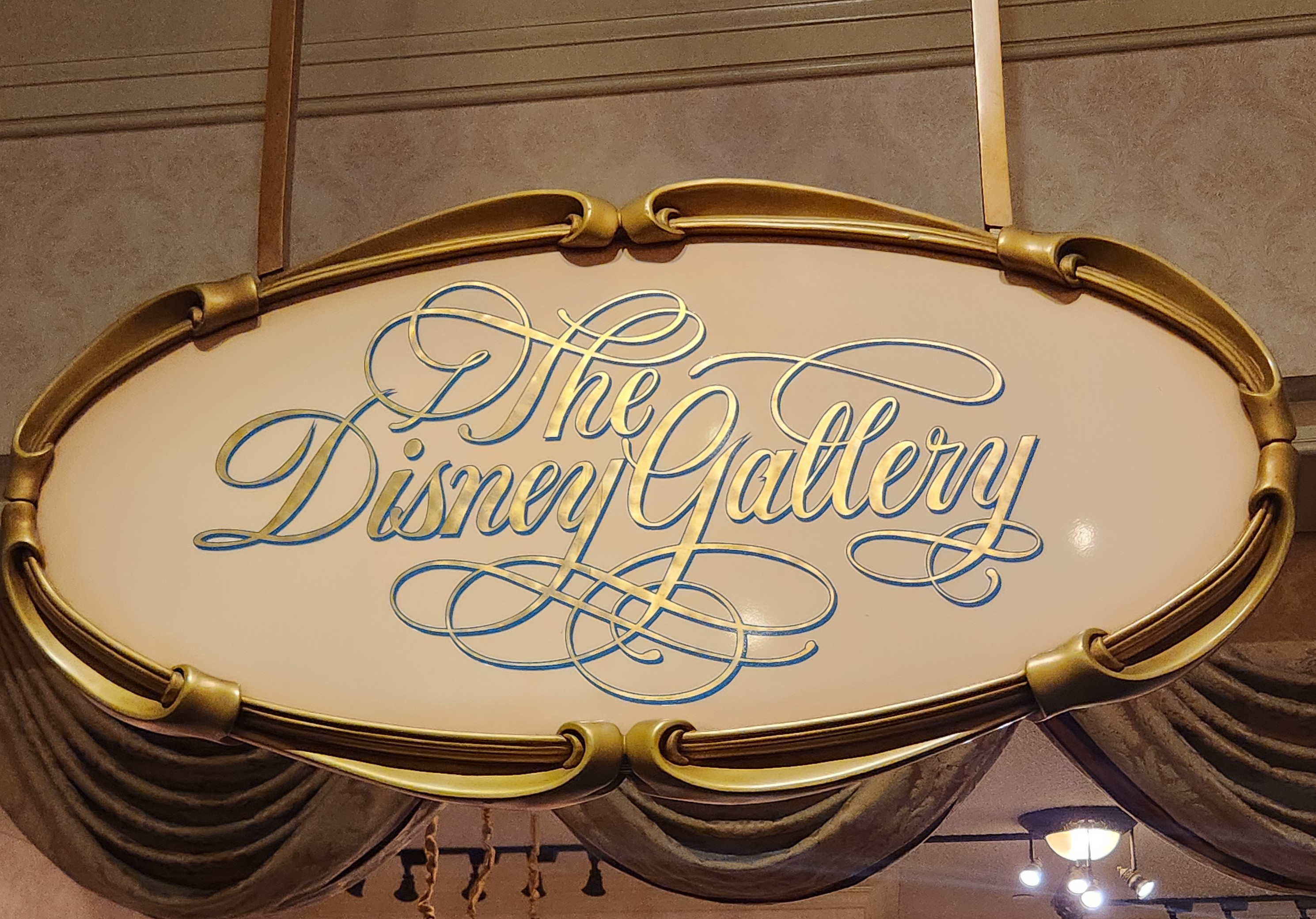
- The Disney Gallery sign at Disneyland

Disneyland
- Area: Main Street, U.S.A.
- Status: Operating
- Opening date: 2013 (Opera House); October 2, 2009 (Bank of Main Street); July 11, 1987 (New Orleans Square)
- Closing date: April 16, 2024 (Opera House); 2013 (Bank of Main Street); August 7, 2007 (New Orleans Square)

Tokyo Disneyland
- Area: World Bazaar
- Status: Removed
- Opening date: April 15, 1993
- Closing date: September 30, 2016

Ride statistics
- Attraction type: Exhibit gallery
- Designer: Walt Disney Imagineering

The Disney Gallery is a walk-through exhibit attraction at Disneyland Park in Anaheim, California, United States. It is an art gallery that was originally established to showcase artwork from Walt Disney Imagineering, but has occasionally presented art from other parts of the Walt Disney Company. Exhibits rotate in and out to coincide with park/attraction anniversaries as well as company-wide promotions.

The Gallery is currently located inside the Disneyland Opera House, the lobby of The Disneyland Story Presenting Great Moments with Mr. Lincoln, where it has been since the summer of 2013. However, from 1987–2007, the Gallery was in New Orleans Square above the Pirates of the Caribbean attraction and the Bank of Main Street building from 2009–2013.

== History ==
=== The Royal Suite ===
In the early 1960s, as the development of what would become New Orleans Square was underway, Walt Disney wanted to incorporate a larger entertaining facility into the plans for various VIPs who came to Disneyland. He already had an apartment above the fire station on Main Street, U.S.A., but it was too small to host extensive events. Disney also had a private dining room inside the Red Wagon Inn (now Plaza Inn), but that was not private enough.

Disney brought in set designer and Imagineer Dorothea Redmond to help him with the apartment layout and design. To furnish and decorate the area, Walt left his wife Lilly and Walt Disney Studio set decorator Emile Kuri to collaborate, as they had on other projects (Club 33, the firehouse apartment, etc.). The project was christened The Royal Suite, after the main street in New Orleans Square (Royal Street). The entrance to The Royal Suite was inside of a small courtyard (The Royal Courtyard) off of the street. The suite would take up a sizable portion of the second-floor space of the New Orleans Square buildings, sharing with Club 33.

Walt Disney died on December 15, 1966. As a consequence, many projects at Walt Disney Productions were either put on hold or abandoned. The Royal Suite was abandoned at the request of Disney's surviving brother and business partner, Roy O. Disney. The Suite was fairly close to completion at the time of Walt's death, including plumbing.

=== INA and DLI ===
The Insurance Company of North America (INA), a sponsor inside the park, took over the New Orleans Square space after the Disney apartment was abandoned. They finished the space and retained Emile Kuri to decorate, approximating the look of the Disney apartment. INA renamed the apartment 21 Royal Street, after the apartment's numerical address. It served as a hospitality suite for INA employees and clients during their day at the park.

INA moved out of the suite in 1974 and Disneyland International (DLI) moved in. DLI is the arm of Walt Disney Productions (now The Walt Disney Company) that helped plan Tokyo Disneyland with the Oriental Land Company, and the suite was being used as executive offices as well as planning spaces. There was even a large scale model of the park placed in one of the rooms so the OLC executives could physically see the layout of their new park.

=== The Gallery ===
DLI moved out of the suite in the mid-1980s when they outgrew the space, and it was left with an uncertain future. At the same time, Imagineer Tony Baxter was put on a project to improve guest traffic around the Pirates of the Caribbean attraction. The queue for Pirates would get so long at times that it would swell out to the Rivers of America and block the walkway into New Orleans Square and Bear Country (now known as Bayou Country).

Baxter designed a themed footbridge to keep traffic flowing with the Pirates queue going underneath. He then set his sights on the old Royal Suite, just above the queue. Baxter designed a pair of ornamental staircases that would hug the footbridge and create a unique frame for the building exterior. Baxter had thought that a beautiful place like Walt Disney's suite was going to waste not being seen by park guests.

Baxter asked recently elected Walt Disney Company president and COO Frank Wells what the plans were for the Royal Suite space. Wells said that Club 33 was vying for the space in order to add more membership slots. Baxter then countered with an idea for an art gallery open to park guests. The Imagineers had always wanted a place to display their artwork for the theme parks, which went largely unseen by the public.

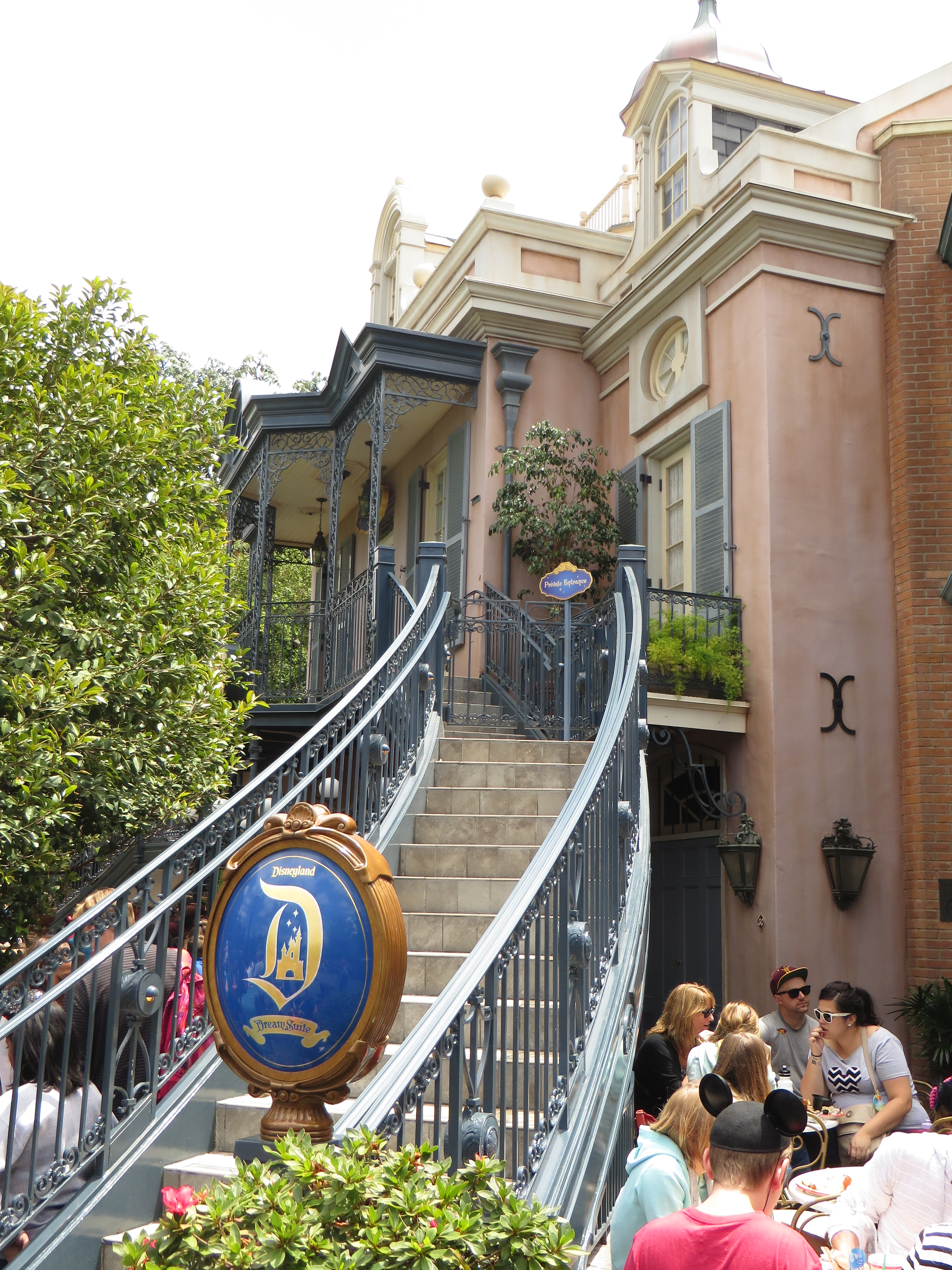
Entrance to the Disneyland Dream Suite, formerly The Disney Gallery, 2015.

The Disney Gallery opened on July 11, 1987, and featured an exhibit called "The Art of Disneyland 1955–1987." The Gallery was unique in all of Disneyland because it was the only location that was listed as both an attraction and a merchandise location on the park's map. The Cast Members who worked the location were from the park's Merchandise division, but were specially trained to run the Gallery as a museum. Cast Members were also encouraged to give guests free tours of the Gallery during slower periods—informing guests of the facility's history as well as the current exhibition.

The Disney Gallery in New Orleans Square closed on August 7, 2007. The space was turned into the Disneyland Dream Suite—a two-bedroom, two-bath guest suite. During the "Year of a Million Dreams," guests were chosen at random to spend the night in the Dream Suite. Imagineers used the original 1960s Royal Suite designs and concepts created by Dorothea Redmond and set decorator Emile Kuri as inspiration. Walt Disney Imagineering art director Kim Irvine said that the suite would "be filled with things that might have inspired Walt as he dreamed of Disneyland."

The Dream Suite closed in 2014, and was converted into an additional dining space for Club 33 members, operating under the name 21 Royal. In 2017, 21 Royal was opened up to the public as a fine dining experience priced at $15,000 for a maximum of 12 guests.

=== Bank of Main Street ===
The Gallery opened at its current location on Main Street U.S.A. on October 2, 2009 in the space previously occupied by the Bank of Main Street. The bank building was opened up and the exhibit space that once housed the display of Walt Disney's two studio offices was absorbed into the new Gallery. The former office display spaces would now be exhibit rooms. The bank's vault remained and was utilized as a display for more valuable merchandise.

=== Opera House ===
In June of 2013, The Disney Gallery closed and became the new home of the Disneyana Shop, which itself had closed to make way for the Disneyland Starbucks location at the Market House on Main Street. The Gallery was moved into a portion of the lobby for The Disneyland Story Presenting Great Moments with Mr. Lincoln, where its exhibits rotated periodically to coincide with company promotions or highlighting attraction anniversaries.

=== Future ===
The Disney Gallery closed, along with Great Moments with Mr. Lincoln, on April 16, 2024. At D23—The Ultimate Disney Fan Event in August 2024, Disney Experiences chairman Josh D'Amaro announced that the attraction would be replaced with Walt Disney – A Magical Life, which opened in 2025, for the park's 70th anniversary celebration. The attraction features an Audio-Animatronics figure of Walt Disney. After a year regularly presenting Walt Disney – A Magical Life, it will rotate with Great Moments with Mr. Lincoln throughout each operating day.

== Gallery layout (1987–2007) ==
The Disney Gallery comprised several rooms and antechambers, as it was designed to be living quarters for the Disney family. Each room contained its own set of artwork and usually revolved around a certain theme that pertained to the overall exhibit.

=== Front Room/Formal Sitting Room ===
The first room guests walked into was known as the Front Room. This was the introductory room to the exhibit. Artwork in this room was usually more broad, getting more specific as guests progressed through the room.

As the Royal Suite, this room was known as the Formal Sitting Room. This is where Walt's guests would have spent most of their time, both before and after a meal. The guest entrance from the staircase was originally just another window when the building was first constructed. The balcony with the Pirates of the Caribbean marquee on the front was originally a false balcony and had to be reinforced to accommodate people.

=== Vestibule ===
To the left of the front room was the vestibule. This miniature hallway contained two rooms that were off-limits to guests. Upon entering the vestibule, the door on the right led to the print room, which was the nerve center for the gallery's Art-on-Demand system. When the gallery opened this room was an administrative office, used for training and other purposes. The room on the left led to a small office that was used by the management of the gallery.

The two rooms were originally designed for two very distinct purposes. The manager office was intended to be a men's smoking lounge. Walt Disney was a smoker for most of his life and planned on having a separate, ventilated room where he and his friends could smoke. The print room's intended use is not clearly known, though it is presumed the room was going to be used as a guest room or a room for Walt's grandchildren to play in.

=== Collector's Room/Informal Sitting Room ===
The room to the right of the Front Room was known as the Collector's Room. The retail operation of the Gallery was located here. The merchandise changed with the exhibition, but some mainstays of the Gallery have been miniature, matted, vintage attraction posters and books about Disney art and Disney history.

The Art-on-Demand kiosks were also located here, allowing guests to choose a specific picture and have that picture custom printed for them. The system has been popular with longtime guests and offers a less-expensive alternative to lithographs, giclees, and other expensive pieces. The prints come in different sizes, with prices ranging from $15 – $50. Framing for these and other pieces is also available.

This room was originally known as the Informal Sitting Room. Often compared to a modern-day den, the Informal Sitting Room was a place for Walt and his guests to sit and relax before and after dinner. It is likely that the television would have gone in this room. There was also going to be a wet bar (used as a cash register area for the Gallery), where Walt could have mixed fancy drinks and served appetizers for his guests. Cast Members like to point out the Sub-Zero miniature refrigerator, as it is the same one installed in 1966, and it still works.

=== Balcony ===
The Collector's Room was the only way to access the Gallery's expansive balcony. Guests could sit up in the Balcony and people watch as long as they want. In the evening, the Gallery Balcony was used as a hard-ticket seating area for the Fantasmic! river show. The seats included an all-you-can-eat dessert buffet with unlimited soft drinks and coffee. Within the wrought iron of the balcony's barrier are the initials "WD" and "RD", for "Walt Disney" and "Roy Disney". The balcony is the only area in the entire gallery where Walt Disney stood.

=== Back Hallway/Grand Entrance ===
Traveling through the Collector's Room, guests would find the Back Hallway. This area was originally used to display collector's lithographs and other framed artwork. Sample Art-on-Demand pieces also hung in this area. In the later days of the Gallery this area was used as another exhibit room displaying artwork for viewing.

The Back Hallway was originally the Grand Entrance to the Disney apartment. The door at the rear is connected to the ground floor by a flight of stairs located in a small courtyard. The marker that denotes the address of the apartment still stands. The staircase and back door is considered off-limits to guests.

=== Blue Room/Formal Dining Room ===
The room to the right of the Back Hallway was known as the Blue Room. The name came from the color of the wall when the Gallery first opened. This was the largest exhibit area until early 2007, when the room was divided in half. One half was given to Club 33 as storage space which was then turned into Club 33's kitchen. The half that remained as the Gallery was a more intimate space. When the Blue Room was whole, a side balcony on the far side of the room was used as a VIP seating area for Fantasmic! This balcony was off-limits to guests at all times, and was reserved for special guests of the Walt Disney Company.

This room would have been The Royal Suite's Formal Dining Room. Originally rectangular in shape, it would have accommodated a large dining room table that could have probably seated 15 - 20 guests. On the far side of the room was an outline for a doorway that would have led to the Club 33 kitchen. The Royal Suite had no real kitchen, so it was necessary for the Club's chefs to provide all the meals.

=== Patio ===
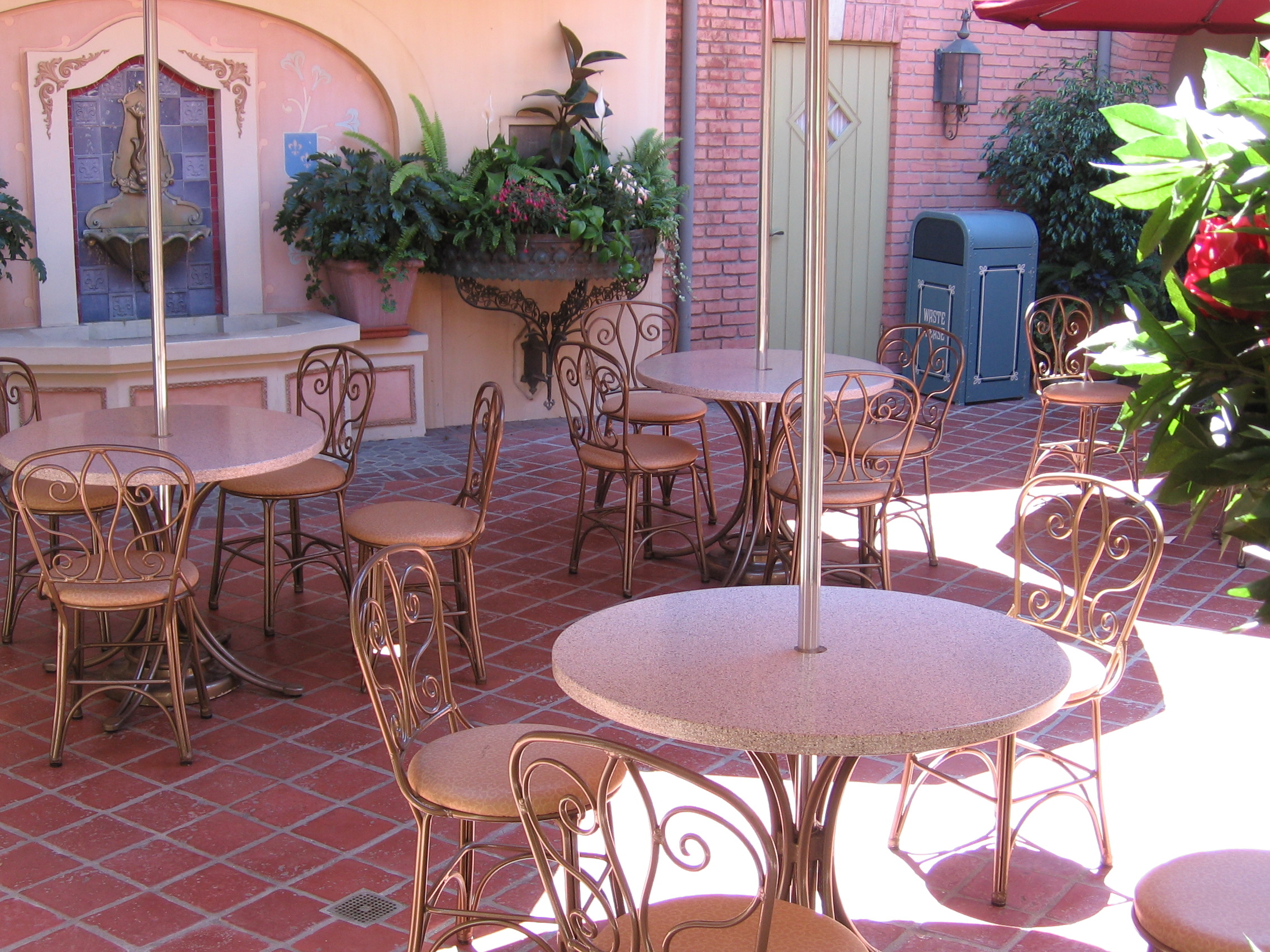
Patio area of the Disney Gallery

The Patio was the "hub" of the Gallery, with almost every room attached to it. The Patio contained tables and chairs.

Originally conceived by Lillian Disney, the Patio was a place where Lilly could be outdoors, but away from the Park guests. Lilly also purchased the bronze fountain head sculpture, as well as other antiques located throughout the Gallery. Since she was a lover of plants, Lilly had planters installed wherever possible.

Walt also had a hand in the design of the Patio. There are air conditioning ducts located on the eaves of the roof, surrounding the patio. This was a system that Walt was experimenting with to provide air conditioning outdoors. The ducts in the eaves would provide an invisible barrier, while the ducts located underneath the eaves would actually regulate the temperature. It was never hooked up and never used.

=== Green Room/Master Bedroom ===
To left of the patio, cut off from the rest of the Gallery was the Green Room, named for the same reason as the Blue Room. This room changed little since the Gallery opened and was the largest display area in the Gallery

The room was tucked away from the rest of the Gallery because it was going to be used as the Master Bedroom. A large bay window was located next to the bedroom door (later covered by another display wall). The Master Bedroom also had a bathroom with a marble sink top, a shower alcove, and a toilet; there was no tub. The bathroom space was used as a merchandise stockroom and remained locked at all times.

== Other locations ==
The first Walt Disney Gallery was opened outside of the park next to the Disney Store, Main Place Santa Ana mall in California on November 4, 1994 and was operated by Disney Store, under Doug Murphy, vice president of the Walt Disney Gallery. The prototype store was designed by Disney Imagineering.

The 3,100-square-foot store used a museum shop method for its products organized into four sections, The Animation Gallery, The Contemporary Gallery, Vintage Disney and The Gallery Shop. Doug Murphy was hired by Disney Store as manager of new business development in September 1991 promoted to head business development in April 1993 then appointed vice president of the Walt Disney Gallery for Disney Store in December 1994. In late May 1995, the store held a meet and discussion with Beauty and the Beast musical costume designer Ann Hould-Ward and offering some of her work, limited edition lithographs, original watercolor sketches, line drawing and works-in-progress collages, plus film's animation.

The main product lines are Disney animation art, collectibles, fashions and home accessories. This location was stocked with high-priced animation art, dinnerware, flatware, Lladró figures, fashion, laser discs and research books. The feature artists included Amadio-Smith Raku, Bob Kliss and Paul Butler. The store was later closed. Fashion items included marcasite cuff links and necklaces by Judith Jack, Kathrine Baumann designed pave minaudière and purse accessories, sterling silver by Judy Kuo and Bill Schiffer and Gérald Genta designed watches. Also, Nicole Miller designed a collection sold there that included backpack, eyewear case and toiletry kit. Items from Disney's private label were of higher quality. Baumann's limited edition minaudieres—-crystal covered purses shaped in the heads of Mickey and Minnie Mouse generated the most conversation. At $1,600, these jewelry boxes have been purchased by cereal heiress Mercedes Kellogg Bass, Michael Eisner's wife, Jane, diet guru Jenny Craig and others.

By 2006, another location opened in Downtown Disney, Orlando.

== See also ==
- List of past Disneyland attractions
