= Blue Bayou (disambiguation) =

"Blue Bayou" is a song written by Roy Orbison and Joe Melson and sung by Orbison.

Blue Bayou may also refer to:

- Blue Bayou and Dixie Landin' a water/amusement park in Baton Rouge, Louisiana
- The Blue Bayou Restaurants operated within Disneyland and Tokyo Disneyland
- Blue Bayou, a 1990 film directed by Karen Arthur
- Blue Bayou (film), a 2021 film directed by Justin Chon
- A short film on the Disney animated film Make Mine Music
- An episode from NCIS: Origins.
