= Holidayland =

Former picnic ground at Disneyland

- Area: 9 acres (3.6 ha)

Disneyland
- Status: Defunct
- Opened: June 16, 1957
- Closed: September 1961
- Replaced by: New Orleans Square

Holidayland was a 9-acre (36,000 m^{2}) grassy picnic ground located along the western edge of Disneyland, near the area that is now New Orleans Square. It is known as the "lost" land of Disneyland. Opening on June 16, 1957, Holidayland had its own admission gate into Disneyland and could hold up to 7,000 guests for large events. It also had playgrounds, horseshoes, baseball field, volleyball, "the world's largest candy-striped circus tent" (previously used by the short-lived Mickey Mouse Club Circus and Keller's Jungle Killers attractions) and other activities. Food and concessions were available for purchase including beer, which was not sold on the neighboring premises of Disneyland.

Holidayland closed in September 1961 due to its lack of shade, no nighttime lighting or restrooms, and alleged lack of Disney "flavor". According to Disney Legend Milt Albright, Holidayland's manager, "It wasn't any one thing that killed Holidayland. It was just the combined effect of a whole lot of things."

Today, the former location of Holidayland houses support facilities for the park, including show buildings for The Haunted Mansion and Pirates of the Caribbean.

== History ==
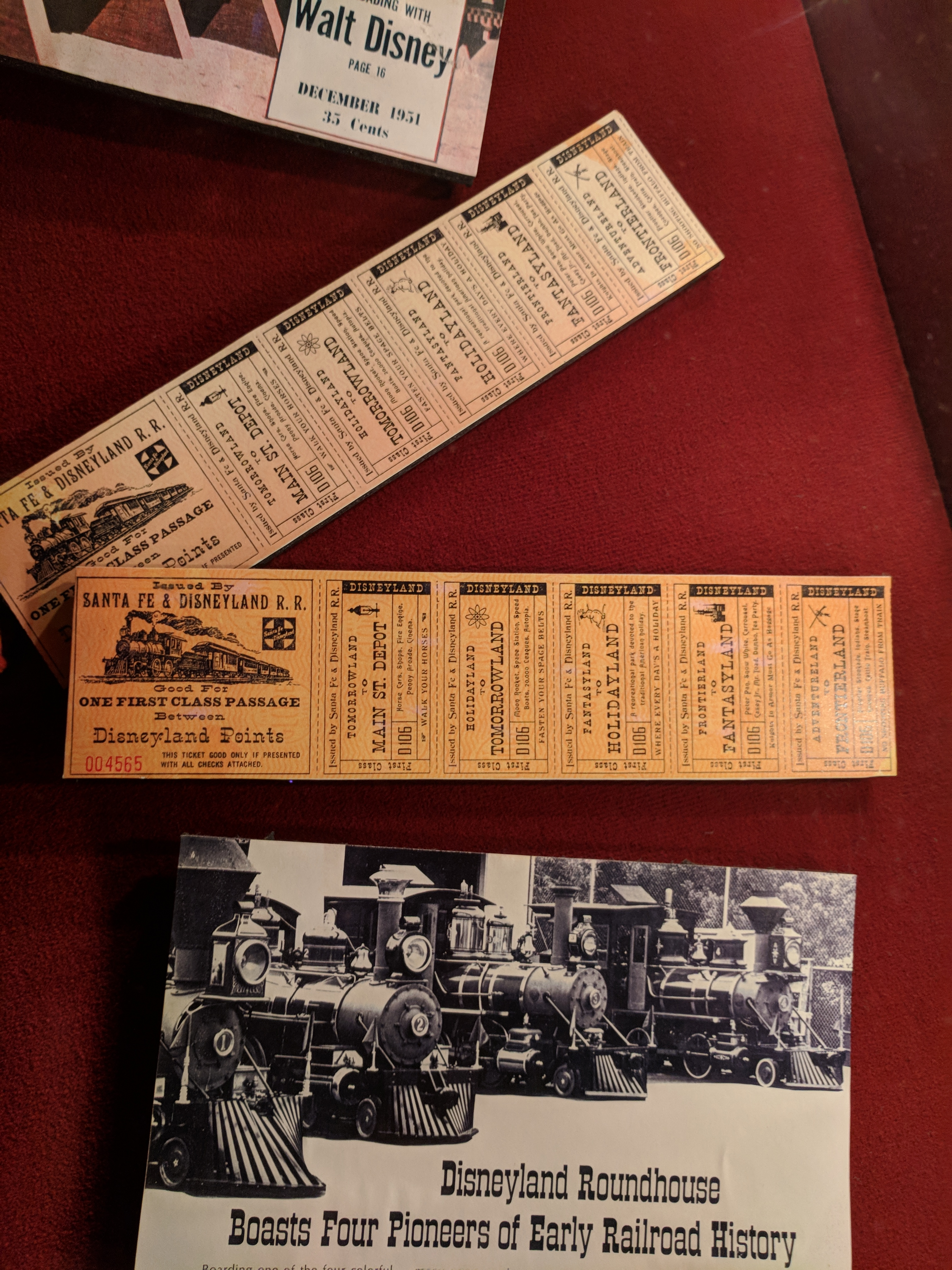
Tickets used to promote the Disneyland Railroad before the opening of Disneyland in 1955

The original concept for Holidayland was that of a turn-of-the-century town park, with picnic areas, horseshoe pits, a baseball diamond, and perhaps an open field where a circus could come to perform. This original version would be located where the Matterhorn sits today. As Disneyland came together in 1954, it became apparent that there wasn't enough space within the park for Holidayland to become a reality, and the land (now sometimes called "Recreationland") became a picnic and recreation area, with minor seasonal holiday decorations.

In November 1955, the Mickey Mouse Club Circus came to Disneyland, in the Fantasyland section of the park. This event only lasted until January 1956, and was themed to the celebration of Christmas, with promotional material referring to the circus as "Holidayland," including a November 25, 1955 Los Angeles Times article declaring "Holidayland was a roaring success. The kids consumed great amounts of popcorn, and [Walt] Disney enjoyed himself as much as anybody.

== See also ==
- List of former Disneyland attractions
- List of Disneyland attractions
