= New Orleans Square =

Themed land at Disneyland in California

Coordinates: 33.8112°N 117.9210°W

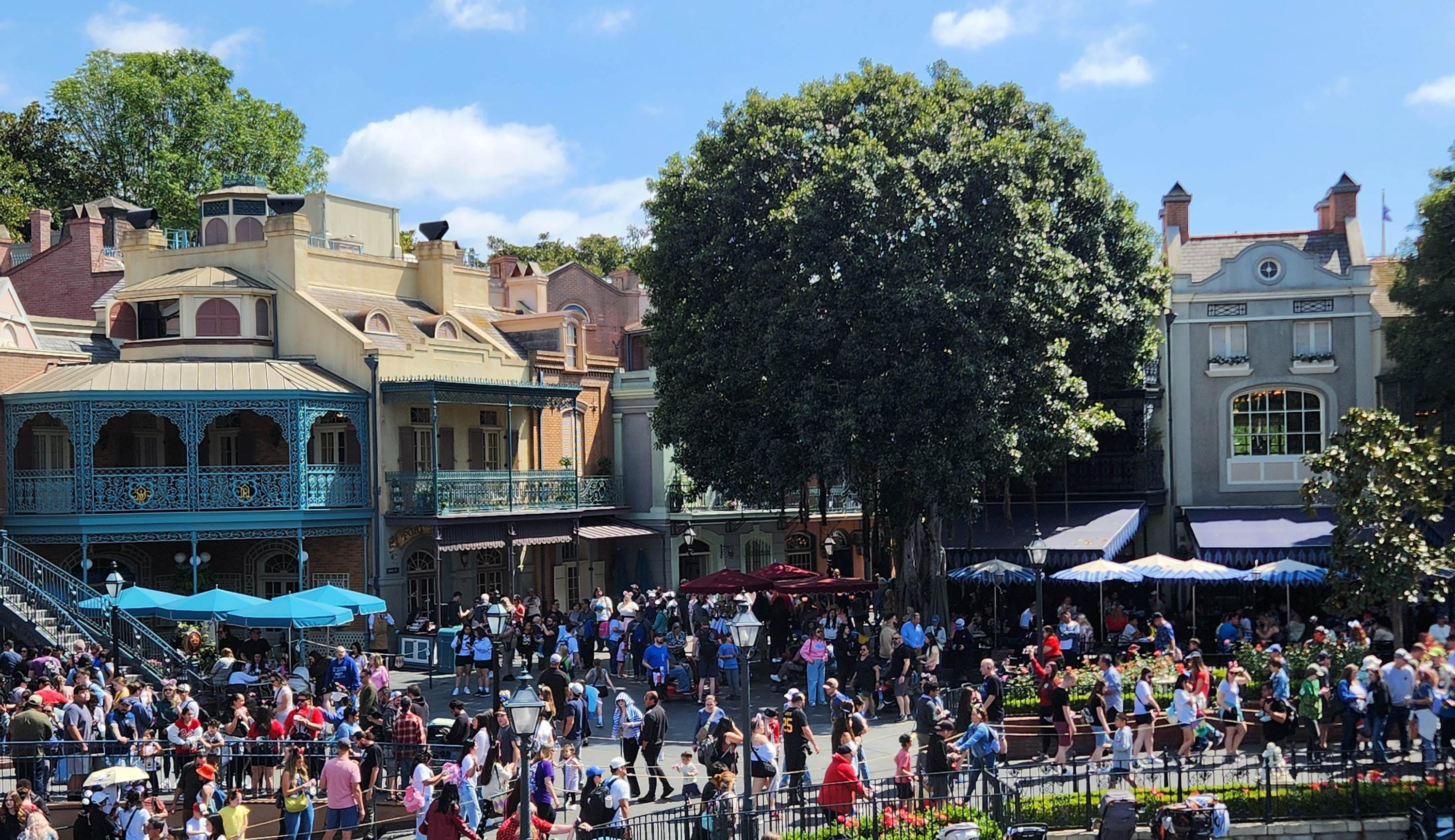
- Interactive map of New Orleans Square
- Theme: 19th Century New Orleans

Disneyland
- Status: Operating
- Opened: July 24, 1966
- Replaced: Holidayland

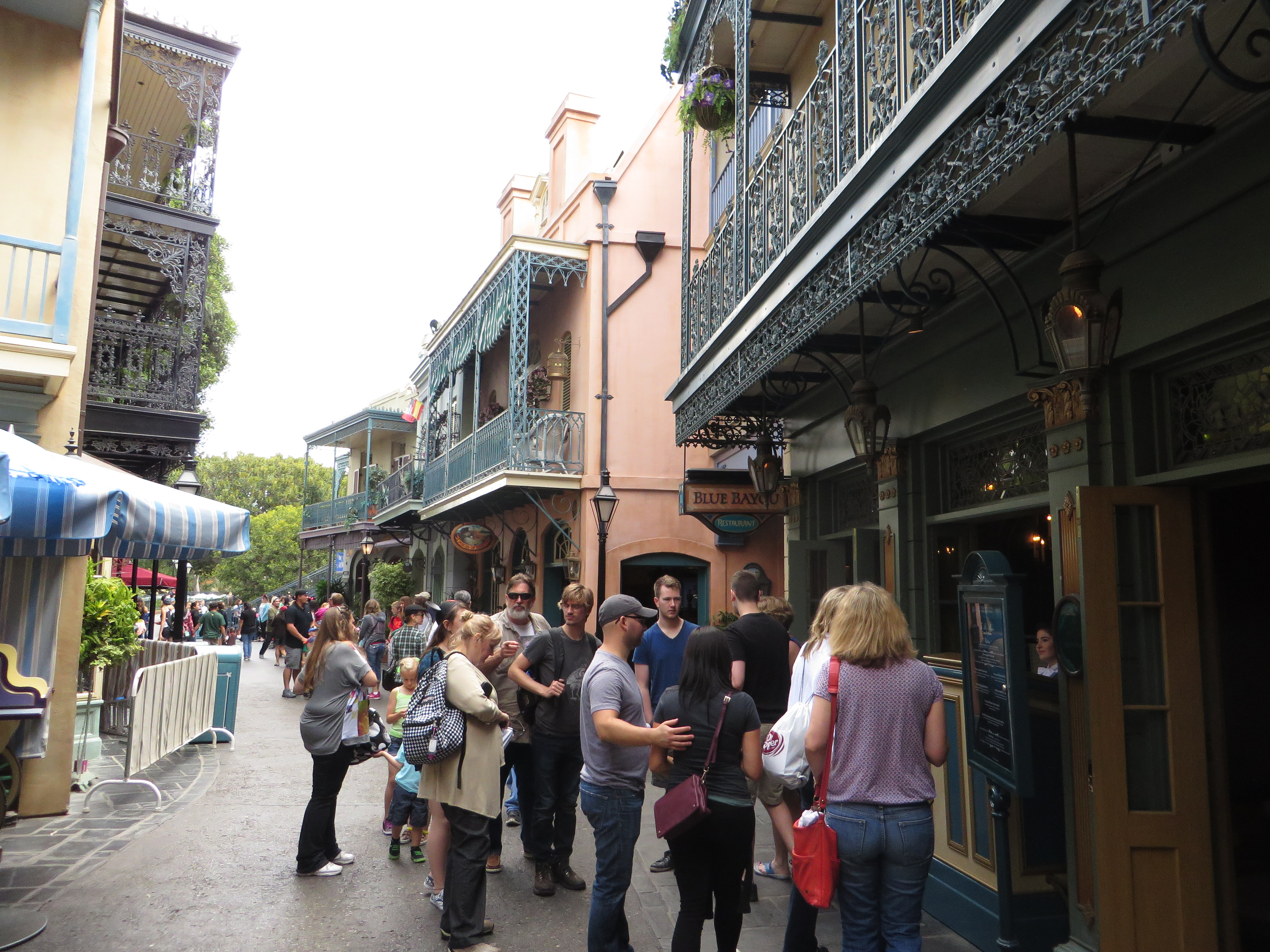
New Orleans Square in 2015

New Orleans Square is a themed land found at Disneyland in Anaheim, California, that opened on July 24, 1966. Based on 19th-century New Orleans, Louisiana, the roughly three-acre area was the first land to be added to Disneyland after the park's opening, at a cost of $18 million. It is exclusive to Disneyland, although a similarly themed area can be found within Adventureland at Tokyo Disneyland.

The area features an intricate series of streets that weave around shops, restaurants and the Pirates of the Caribbean and The Haunted Mansion show buildings. At one point, it included the only overnight accommodations in the park open to the public, the now closed Disneyland Dream Suite.

== History ==
Plans to include a New Orleans-themed area were made in the late 1950s as a part of an expansion and the area was included on a 1958 souvenir map. In 1961–1962, construction began on the land and the attractions. To accommodate the new land, the Frontierland Station of the Disneyland Railroad was shifted farther west, and the station was eventually renamed to the New Orleans Square Station soon after the land's opening.

The land was opened to the public on July 24, 1966, with New Orleans mayor Victor H. Schiro participating in the dedication ceremony. Schiro announced Walt Disney had been made an honorary citizen of New Orleans; Disney joked that the addition cost as much as the original Louisiana Purchase. Without adjusting for inflation, it actually cost more. The opening ceremony was Disney's last major public appearance at Disneyland before his death in December 1966.

In March 1967, Pirates of the Caribbean debuted alongside the Blue Bayou Restaurant. In August 1969, The Haunted Mansion was opened to the public.

== Attractions and entertainment ==
=== Current attractions and entertainment ===
- Disneyland Railroad (1966-present)
  - New Orleans Square Station
- Pirates of the Caribbean (1967-present)
- The Haunted Mansion (1969-present)

=== Former attractions and entertainment ===
- Pirates Arcade Museum (1967–1980)
- The Disney Gallery (1987–2007)
- Princess Tiana's Mardi Gras Celebration (2009–2010)

== Restaurants ==
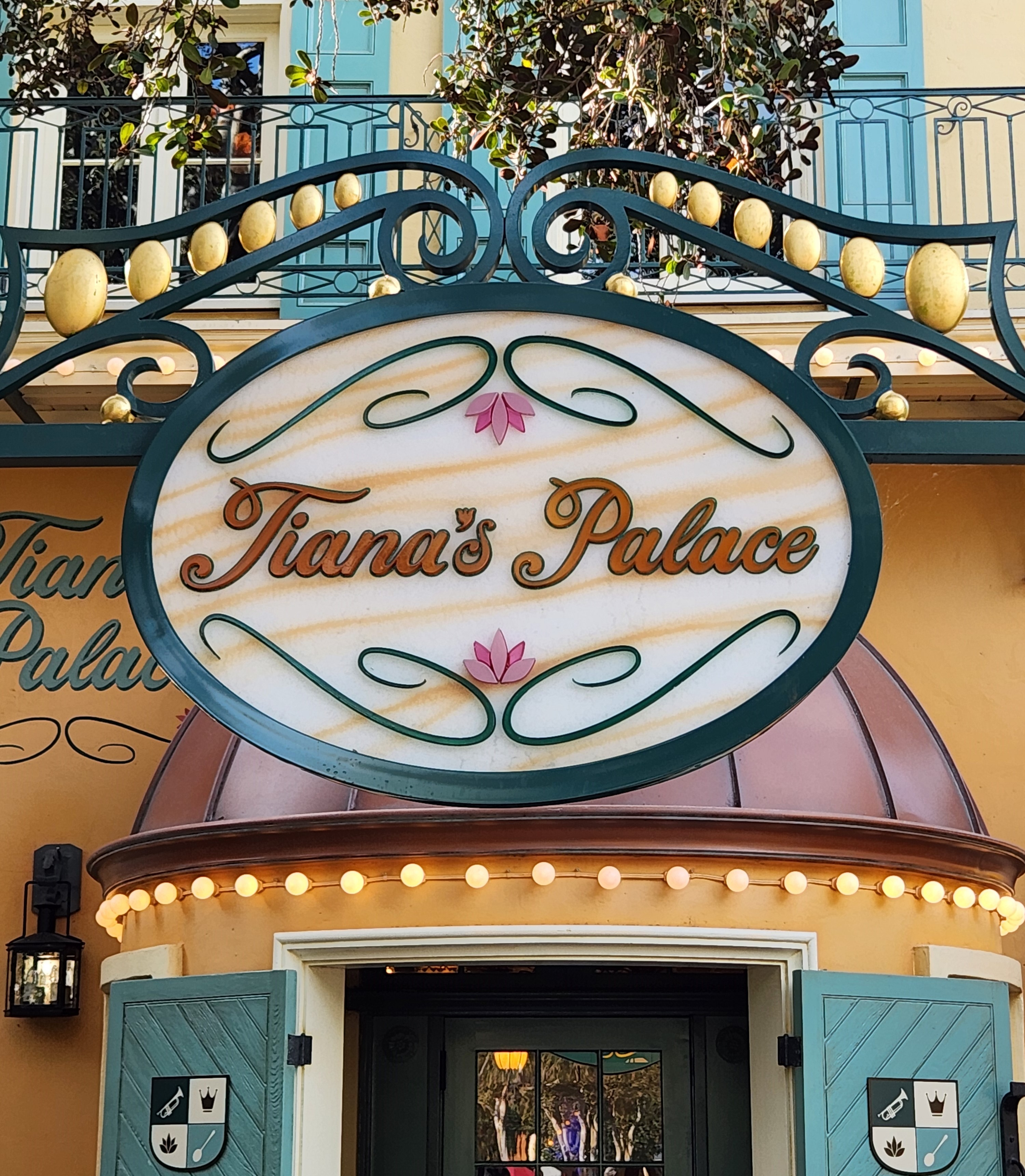
The Tiana's Palace restaurant is inspired by Disney Animation's 2009 film The Princess and the Frog.

- Mint Julep Bar (non-alcoholic)
- Café Orleans
- Royal Street Veranda
- Tiana's Palace
- Harbour Galley
- Blue Bayou Restaurant
- Club 33
- 21 Royal

=== Former restaurants ===
- Le Petite Patisserie (1988–2004)
- French Market Restaurant (1966–2023)

== Shops ==
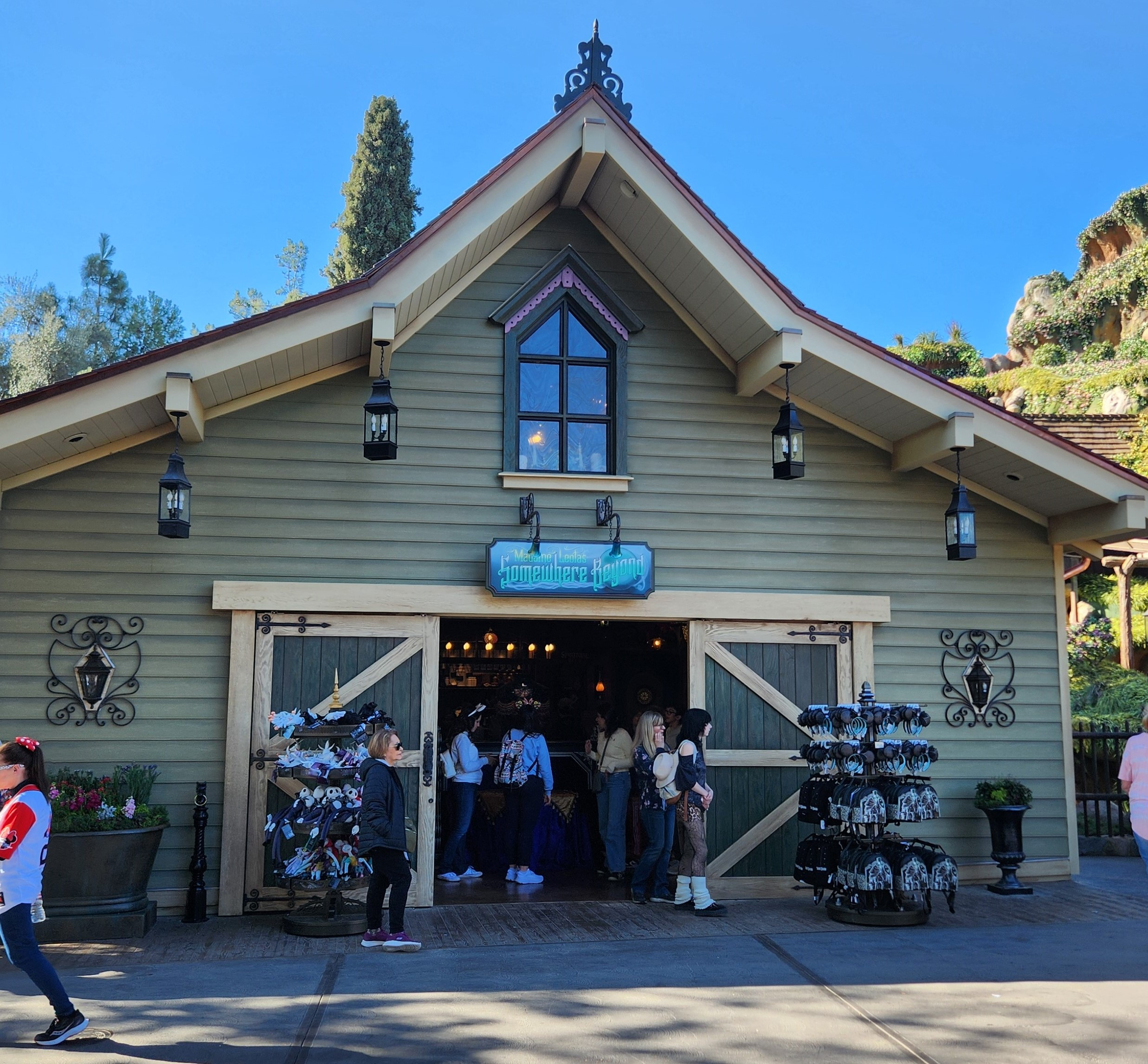
The Haunted Mansion's carriage house is home of the gift shop Madame Leota's Somewhere Beyond.

- La Mascarade D'Orleans
- Port Royal Curios and Curiosities
- Mlle. Antoinette's Parfumerie
- Royal Street Sweets
- Pieces of Eight
- Cristal d'Orleans
- Eudora's Chic Boutique Featuring Tiana's Gourmet Secrets
- Madame Leota's Somewhere Beyond

=== Former shops ===
- Bookstand (1966–1973)
- Le Chapeau (1966–1974)
- Le Forgeron (1966–1974)
- Lafitte's Silver Shop (1966–1988)
- Candy Cart (1966–1995)
- One-of-a-Kind Shop (1966–1996)
- Le Gourmet (1966–1998)
- La Boutique d'Or (1974–1980)
- Marche aux Fleurs (1975–1985)
- Chocolate Collection (1980–1995)
- Port d'Orleans (1995–2002)
- La Boutique de Noel (1998–2006)
- L'Ornement Magique (1998–2013)
- Le Bat en Rouge (1966–2020)

== In popular culture ==
- In the Epic Mickey video game series, Wasteland's version of New Orleans Square is Bog Easy (whose name is based on New Orleans' nickname "Big Easy").
