= Harry Redmond Jr. =

American film producer

- Born: October 15, 1909; Brooklyn, New York
- Died: May 23, 2011 (aged 101); Hollywood Hills, Los Angeles, California
- Occupation(s): Special effects artist, film producer
- Spouse: Dorothea Holt Redmond (1940–2009)

Harry Redmond Jr. (October 15, 1909 – May 23, 2011) was an American special effects artist and film producer whose career spanned decades in the entertainment industry. Redmond was the husband of the late production designer and illustrator, Dorothea Holt Redmond, who helped design Main Street in Disneyland and the Seattle Space Needle.

== Biography ==
=== Early life ===
Born in Brooklyn, Redmond was the son of Harry Redmond Sr., an early special effects artist and film producer. Redmond Sr. operated the former Metropolitan Studios, located on Long Island, New York. Redmond Jr. relocated to Southern California in 1926, where Redmond began a career in film as well.

=== Career ===
Redmond began his career at First National Pictures prop department. He moved to RKO Studios, where he joined the special effects studio for four years. Redmond created special effects for some of RKO's highest profile films throughout the 1930s, including King Kong in 1933 and The Last Days of Pompeii, She and the comedic film, Top Hat, which were all released in 1935, as well as RKO films starring Fred Astaire and Ginger Rogers.

Redmond left RKO after four years in order to create special effects for films on a freelance, independent basis. His film credits during this era included Lost Horizon for director Frank Capra in 1937, Only Angels Have Wings for Howard Hawks in 1939, the western film The Outlaw for Howard Hughes in 1943, The Woman in the Window for Fritz Lang in 1944 and The Stranger for Orson Welles in 1946.

Redmond moved briefly from Hollywood to Fort Monmouth, a United States Army base in Monmouth County, New Jersey, upon the outbreak of World War II. He oversaw the construction and design of a new film studio for the Army Film Training Lab at Fort Monmouth.

He returned to Hollywood, and his special effects career, during the post-war years. Some of his credits immediately following World War II included A Night in Casablanca in 1946, Angel on My Shoulder, which was also released in 1946, The Bishop's Wife in 1947, The Secret Life of Walter Mitty in 1947 and A Song Is Born in 1948.

In 1952, Redmond teamed up with screenwriter and film producer Ivan Tors for the film, Storm Over Tibet. The film led to a series of long-term collaborations between Redmond and Tors, which included partnering on the science fiction films, The Magnetic Monster in 1953 and Gog in 1954, as well as the 1950s and 1960s television series Science Fiction Theatre, Daktari and Sea Hunt. Redmond also worked as associate film producer for Flipper in 1963, Clarence, the Cross-Eyed Lion in 1965 and Zebra in the Kitchen, also in 1965.

Redmond retired from films during the late 1960s after reportedly becoming disillusioned with the industry's budget woes. His finale credits included The Outer Limits, a science fiction television series, and The Unknown, a television movie. He never received any industry awards or nominations for his work, despite a career which spanned decades.

=== Personal life ===
Harry Redmond met his future wife, illustrator and production designer Dorothea Holt while working at Selznick International Pictures studio during the late 1930s. Redmond was working for David O. Selznick on the set of The Prisoner of Zenda, while Holt was designing the pre-production interior sets for Gone with the Wind and Rebecca at the time of their meeting. The couple married in 1940. Holt Redmond would later help design Main Street USA in Disneyland, the Seattle Space Needle and the restaurant at Los Angeles International Airport. Together, Redmond and Holt also designed their home in the Hollywood Hills. Dorothea Holt Redmond died on February 27, 2009, at the age of 98.

Harry Redmond Jr. died at his home in the Hollywood Hills neighborhood of Los Angeles on May 23, 2011, at the age of 101. He was survived by his son and daughter, Lee Redmond and Lynne Jackson, three granddaughters and three great-grandsons. His memorial service was held at Forest Lawn Memorial Park, Glendale on June 21, 2011.
