= Jason Surrell =

American writer

Jason Surrell is a former show writer and producer for Walt Disney Imagineering, the division of The Walt Disney Company that designs and builds for Disney's theme parks and resort hotels. Surrell also is a show director for Walt Disney Entertainment. In June 2014, Surrell left Walt Disney Imagineering and worked with Universal Creative. In August 2025 he returned to work with Walt Disney Imagineering.

== Writing ==
He contributed essays to The Imagineering Way and The Imagineering Workout. Surrell also regularly appears on panels, gives presentations, and interviews other Imagineers at various Disney events.

Surrell wrote a screenwriting manual, Screenplay by Disney: Tips and Techniques to Add Magic to Your Moviemaking, and has also contributed to the Kingdom Keepers series of children's novels by Ridley Pearson.

== Bibliography ==
- The Haunted Mansion: From the Magic Kingdom to the Movies (Known in its 3rd Edition as The Haunted Mansion: Imagineering a Classic)
- The Art of the Haunted Mansion
- Screenplay by Disney: Tips and Techniques to Add Magic to Your Moviemaking (ISBN 0786854405)
- Pirates of the Caribbean: From the Magic Kingdom to the Movies (ISBN 1423107098)
- The Disney Mountains: Imagineering at its Peak (ISBN 1423101553)
