= Disneyland Dream Suite =

Luxury apartment at Disneyland

Coordinates: 33.8112°N 117.9208°W

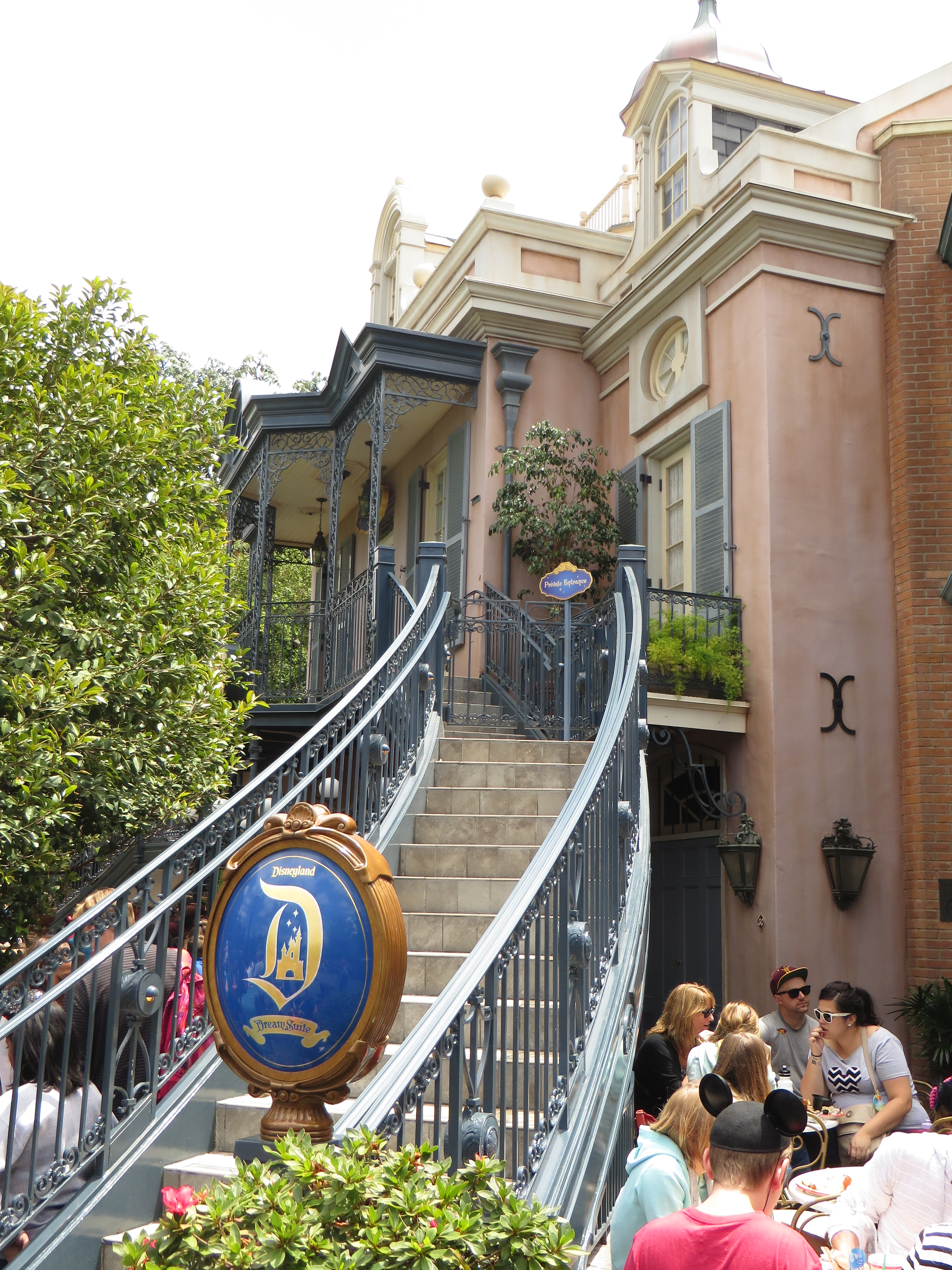

Disneyland
- Area: New Orleans Square
- Status: Closed
- Opening date: January 31, 2008
- Closing date: 2016
- Replaced by: 21 Royal

Ride statistics
- Designer: WED Enterprises
- Theme: Each room is themed after a distinct area of the park.

The Disneyland Dream Suite was a 2,200-square-foot (200 m^{2}) suite located in the New Orleans Square area of Disneyland Park at the Disneyland Resort. It was created as part of the "Year of a Million Dreams" promotion that ran from October 1, 2006, through December 31, 2008, and closed in 2016.

== History of the Suite ==
Original concept art

In the early 1960s as construction of New Orleans Square was proceeding, Walt Disney decided he needed a bigger entertaining facility for various VIPs that came to the park. He already had an apartment above the Fire Station on Main Street, U.S.A., but it was too small to host elaborate events. Disney decided to place the suite in New Orleans Square, set back from the hustle and bustle of the park.

Disney brought in set designer Dorothea Redmond, famous for creating the sets in Gone with the Wind, to help him with the apartment layout. To furnish and decorate the area, he left his wife Lilly and Walt Disney Studio set decorator Emile Kuri to collaborate as they had on other projects (Club 33, the Firehouse Apartment, etc.). The project was christened The Royal Suite, inspired by its location off New Orleans Square's Royal Street.

After Walt Disney died on December 15, 1966, many projects at Walt Disney Productions were put on hold or abandoned. At the request of his brother Roy, who felt the family would not enjoy The Royal Suite with Walt gone, the project was quietly set aside. It was fairly close to completion at the time of Disney's death, including infrastructure and plumbing.

From July 11, 1987, to August 7, 2007, the space housed the Disney Gallery.

== The Dream Suite ==
On October 1, 2007, the Walt Disney Company announced that the recently closed Disney Gallery would be remodeled and turned into the Disneyland Dream Suite. The remodeled suite would be the realization of Walt's dream to have a larger private apartment built at Disneyland, and would be made available to randomly selected guests of the park. The space underwent a whirlwind remodeling, with Disney Imagineers closely following the original design drawings from Dorothea Redmond. Located above the Pirates of the Caribbean ride, the Disneyland Dream Suite included a living room, open-air patio, two bedrooms and two bathrooms.

“Our plan has been to use the renderings that Walt worked on with Dorothea Redmond and to replicate those as exactly as we can,” said Walt Disney Imagineering Art Director Kim Irvine. “Her illustrations were very specific, with a color and style for each room.

“But to make it special for the guests, we want it to be more than just a beautiful suite. We want it to be filled with things that might have inspired Walt as he dreamed of Disneyland."

One of the most distinctive characteristics of the Dream Suite was the private balcony, which overlooked the Rivers of America. From here guests had an unobstructed view of the nighttime spectacular Fantasmic! In addition to that night's lodging in the Disneyland Dream Suite, each selected 2008 Disney Dreams Giveaway winner of the Disneyland Dream Suite would also be celebrated as the honorary grand marshal in that day's Disneyland parade.

The Suite was given out as a prize through various promotions.

== 21 Royal ==
In 2017, the location became 21 Royal, an exclusive dining experience for up to twelve guests per night. At its initial opening, Club 33 members could reserve a five course dining experience here.

It is designed in the Empire style which was popular in 19th-century New Orleans. 21 Royal features murals painted by Disney artist Leslee Turnbull.

In "A Tale of Two Kitchens", the second episode of Season 7 of HGTV's Brother vs. Brother in 2020, Jonathan Scott won a night in 21 Royal after beating his brother Drew in that episode's challenge.
