= Blue Bayou Restaurant =

Blue Bayou

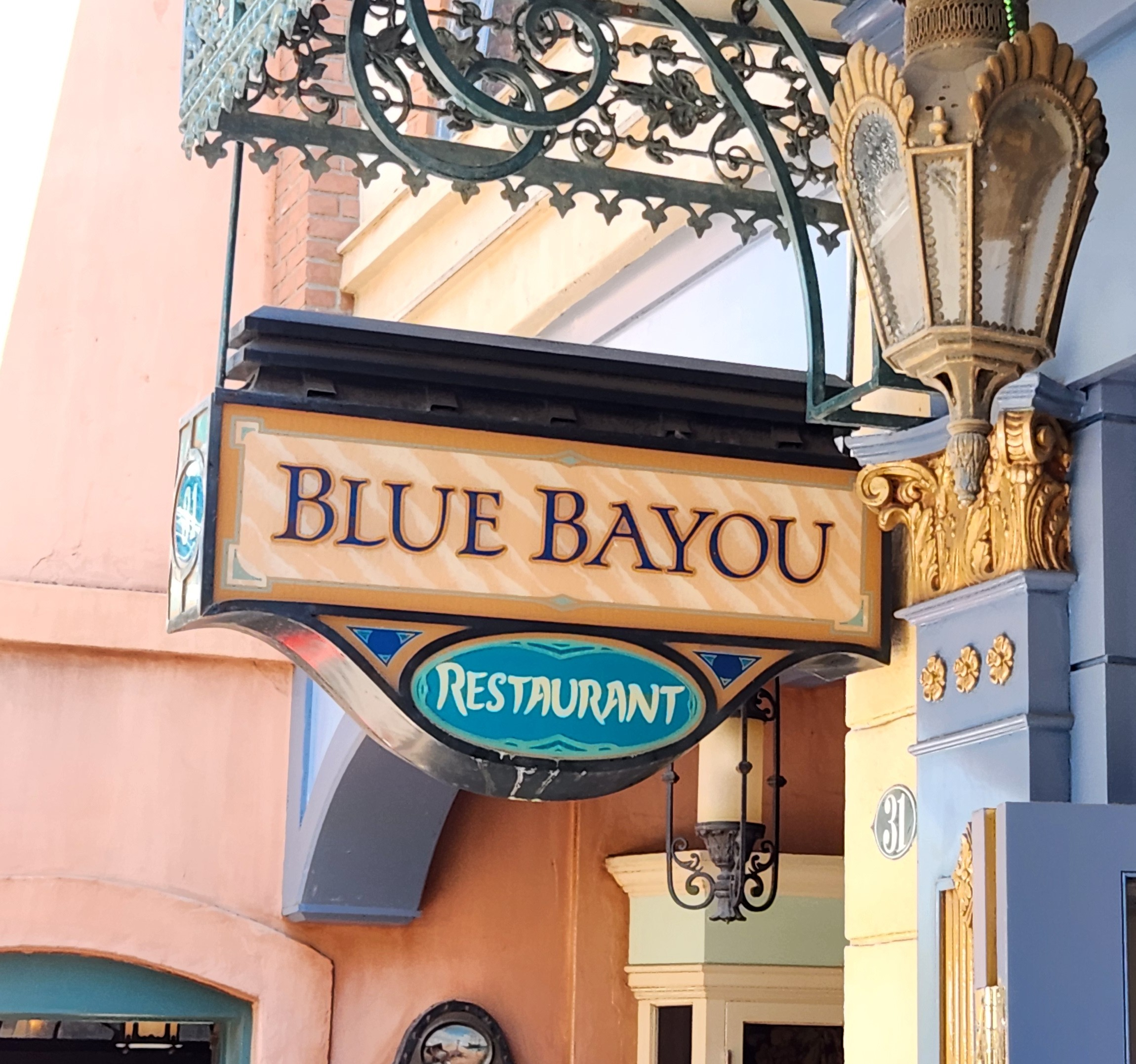
- Blue Bayou Restaurant sign at Disneyland
- Interactive map of Blue Bayou

Restaurant information
- Established: March 18, 1967
- Food type: Cajun
- Dress code: Casual
- Location: Anaheim, California (Original location), United States
- Coordinates: 33.8111217°N 117.9209931°W
- Website: Official website

Blue Bayou is a full-service chain of New Orleans/Cajun-style restaurants located at Disneyland in Anaheim, California and Tokyo Disneyland, in Chiba, Japan.

== History ==
The Disneyland restaurant opened on March 18, 1967, to respond to persistent criticism of the park's lack of fine dining options. It was originally to feature live entertainment, but after a dress rehearsal and trial dinner in 1966, Walt Disney stated, "In this restaurant, the food is going to be the show, along with the atmosphere".

Blue Bayou was the first reservation-based eatery at Disneyland. A reservation could not be made by telephone. Guests had to physically go to the restaurant to sign up for an available time, often prompting an influx of guests arriving at the restaurant as soon as the park gates opened. Currently reservations are accepted up to two months in advance.

== Theming ==
The restaurants are built within the same show building that houses part of the Pirates of the Caribbean attraction, with parts of the ride taking place beneath the restaurant. The interior has a night sky effect which is achieved through the use of a dark and distant ceiling, air conditioning, and coordinated lighting. The theming is supplemented by the sounds of crickets and frogs, the glow of fireflies, and projection effects that imitate a night sky. The restaurants offer a view of the beginning portion of Pirates of the Caribbean. Guests are able to see riders floating by in their boats, and riders can see the restaurant's nighttime lighting as they pass by.

== Similar Disney restaurants ==
The former Blue Lagoon restaurant at Disneyland Park Paris takes a similar approach to that of the Blue Bayou restaurants at Disneyland and Tokyo Disneyland, but it is themed as a Caribbean beach rather than a Louisiana bayou. In 2017, this restaurant was renamed Captain Jack's - Restaurant des Pirates.

== Virtual Magic Kingdom reference ==
Virtual Magic Kingdom featured a single room inspired by the Blue Bayou. "Magic words" such as "mint julep" and "gumbo" allowed players to order food and drink.
