= Pirates of the Caribbean (attraction) =

Dark ride at Disney theme parks

- Attraction logo at Magic Kingdom

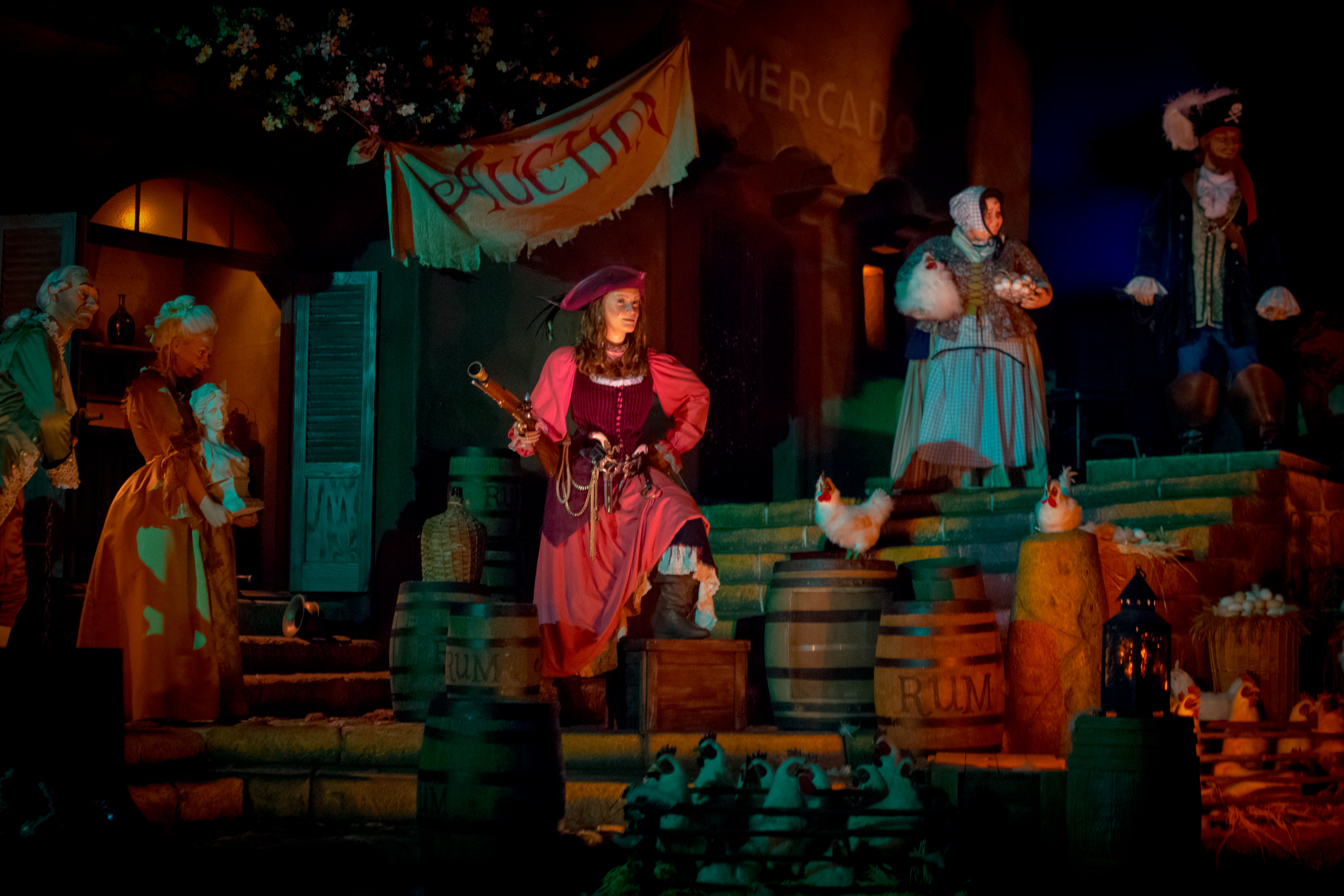
- The auction scene at Disneyland

Disneyland
- Area: New Orleans Square
- Coordinates: 33°48′40.46″N 117°55′14.97″W
- Status: Operating
- Opening date: March 18, 1967; 59 years ago

Magic Kingdom
- Area: Adventureland
- Coordinates: 28°25′4.87″N 81°35′3.19″W
- Status: Operating
- Opening date: December 15, 1973; 52 years ago
- Lightning Lane available

Tokyo Disneyland
- Area: Adventureland
- Coordinates: 35°38′3.31″N 139°52′50.6″E
- Status: Operating
- Opening date: April 15, 1983; 43 years ago

Disneyland Park (Paris)
- Area: Adventureland
- Coordinates: 48°52′24.59″N 2°46′24.22″E
- Status: Operating
- Opening date: April 12, 1992; 34 years ago
- Disney Premier Access available

Ride statistics
- Attraction type: Dark ride
- Designer: WED Enterprises
- Theme: Pirates of the Caribbean, Piracy in the Caribbean in the 17th–18th century
- Music: "Yo Ho (A Pirate's Life for Me)" by George Bruns (music) and Xavier Atencio (lyrics)
- Vehicle type: Bateaux
- Vehicles: 50 Boats
- Riders per vehicle: 23–24
- Duration: Disneyland; 15:30 minutes Magic Kingdom; 8:30 minutes Tokyo Disneyland; 9:30 minutes Disneyland Park Paris; 10:30 minutes
- Number of drops: Disneyland and Disneyland Park Paris; 2 Magic Kingdom, and Tokyo Disneyland; 1
- Audio-animatronics: 119
- Voices: Paul Frees; June Foray; Thurl Ravenscroft; J. Pat O'Malley; Dallas McKennon; Xavier Atencio; Corey Burton (1997–present); Dee Bradley Baker (2005–present); Johnny Depp (2006–present); Geoffrey Rush (2006–present); Bill Nighy (2006–present); Ian McShane (2011–present); Grey DeLisle (2018–present)
- Manufacturer: Arrow Development (Disneyland, Magic Kingdom, Tokyo Disneyland); Intamin (Disneyland Park Paris)
- Sponsor: Kirin Company (Tokyo)
- Must transfer from wheelchair
- Assistive listening available

Pirates of the Caribbean is a dark ride at Disneyland, Magic Kingdom, Tokyo Disneyland and Disneyland Park (Paris).

The ride tells the story of a band of pirates in the West Indies islands around the Caribbean Sea in the 17th and 18th centuries with the saga of their voyages, troubles, and exploits. The original version of the ride opened at the Disneyland in Anaheim, California, near Los Angeles, in 1967, and was the last ride whose construction was envisioned and personally overseen by Walt Disney, who died three months before it opened. After immense popularity, the ride was replicated six years later at the Magic Kingdom of Walt Disney World, near Orlando, Florida in 1973. Versions followed at Tokyo Disneyland in 1983, and at Disneyland Park Paris in 1992. While each of the initial four versions of the ride have a different façade, they all provide a similar ride experience.

The Pirates of the Caribbean ride gave rise to the song "A Pirate's Life for Me" written by George Bruns and Xavier Atencio. While many Disney park attractions are based on films, this particular ride became the basis for the Pirates of the Caribbean film series, which debuted in 2003. Since 2006, Disney has incorporated characters (such as Jack Sparrow and Hector Barbossa) from the film series into the Disneyland, Magic Kingdom, Tokyo Disneyland, and Disneyland Park Paris versions of the ride. A different ride influenced by visitors' familiarity with the worldwide success of the feature film series, Pirates of the Caribbean: Battle for the Sunken Treasure, opened at the Shanghai Disneyland in 2016.

== Voice cast (Disneyland and Magic Kingdom) ==
- Johnny Depp as Captain Jack Sparrow (2006-present)
- Geoffrey Rush as Captain Barbossa (2006-present)
- Bill Nighy as Davy Jones (2006-present)
- Xavier Atencio as Skull
- Paul Frees as Dead Men Tell No Tales Voice, & Auctioneer Pirate (1967-2018)
- Kiff VandenHeuvel as Auctioneer Pirate (2018-present)
- Grey DeLisle as Redhead (2018-present)
- Ian McShane as Blackbeard (2011-present)
- Thurl Ravenscroft as Accordion Playing Pirate, Dog, & Drunken Pirate On Lamppost
- J Pat O'Malley as Captain At Well (original voice; 1967-1997)
- Corey Burton as Captain At Well (new voice; 1997-present), & Pooped Pirate (1997-present)
- Wally Wingert as Pirate On Bridge
- Gary Goddard as Barker Bird
- Dee Bradley Baker as Mr. Cotton's Parrot (2005-present)

== History ==
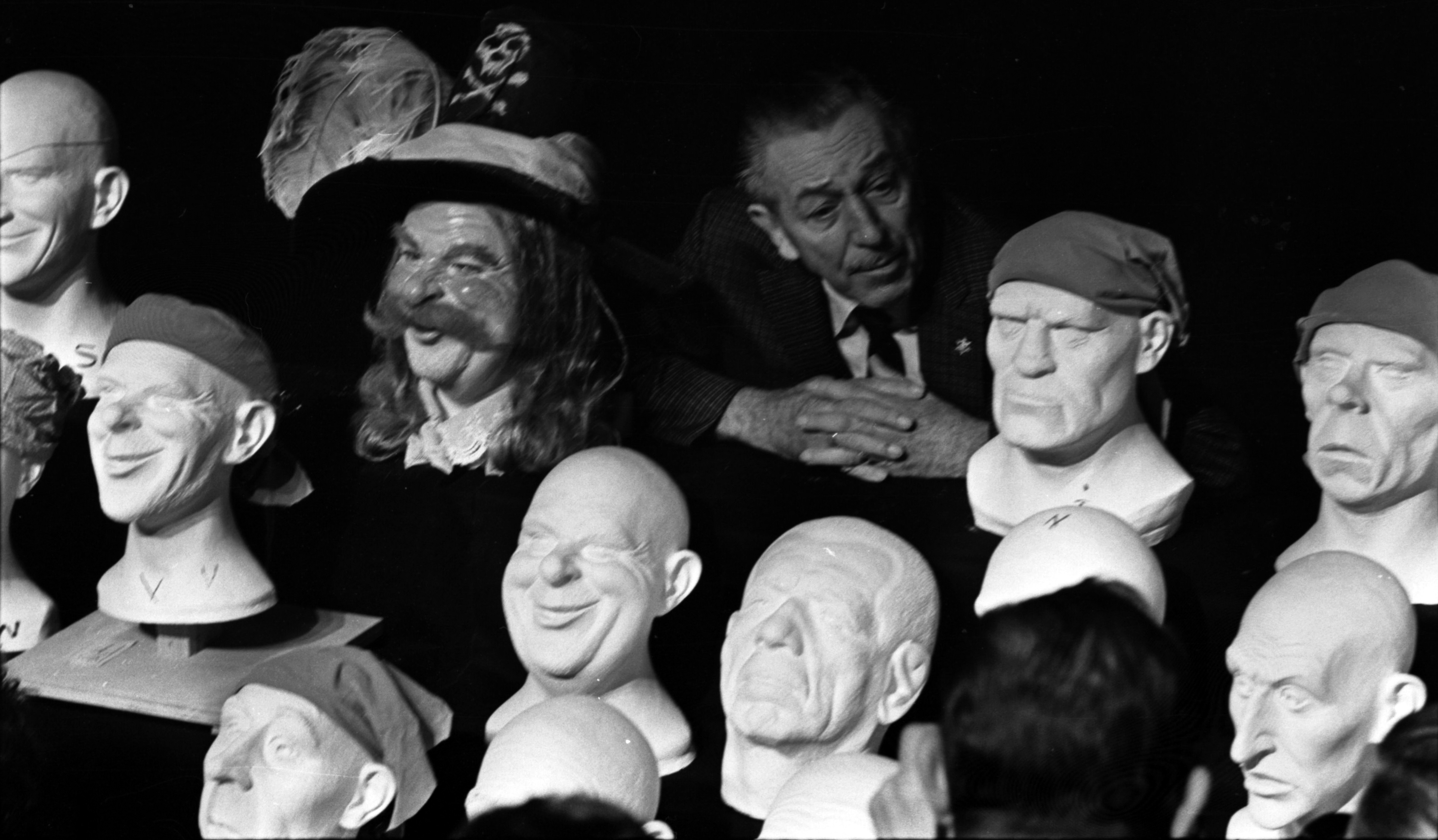
Walt Disney in 1966, inspecting plastic heads for use in the Disneyland attraction.

Pirates of the Caribbean is a show taking place in the Golden Age of Piracy. While the timeframe is unconfirmed, the Vacationland magazine said the ride plunges into the 17th century, while Jason Surrell's book, Pirates of the Caribbean: From the Magic Kingdom to the Movies, suggested the ride enters the late 1700s.

Opening on March 18, 1967, the Disneyland version of Pirates of the Caribbean was the last ride that Walt Disney participated in designing, debuting three months after his death. It is located within the New Orleans Square portion of Disneyland, its facade evoking antebellum era New Orleans, topped by a 31-star United States flag (which would indicate the 1850s). It was originally envisioned as a walk-through wax museum, but with the success of the boat ride concept of It's a Small World at the 1964 New York World's Fair, Disney decided to employ the same ride system on the Pirates of the Caribbean. An overhead sign at the boat dock names it for the famous pirate Jean Lafitte (although his name is spelled Laffite as the pirate himself originally spelled it, rather than with the English spelling which has now become standard), who fought alongside the U.S. Army at the Battle of New Orleans in the War of 1812. The second floor of the facade was originally designed to be a private Disney family apartment, but was later opened in spring 1987 as an art-related retail/museum space called the Disney Gallery and was replaced in late 2007 by the Disneyland Dream Suite.

The original installation at Disneyland was manufactured by Arrow Development and Arrow consulted on the next two installations. The ride's passenger carrying boats are very similar to those in a patent assigned to Walt Disney Productions, but filed by Edgar A. Morgan, one of the founders of Arrow Development. Arrow participated in the design and development of many rides at Disneyland from 1953.

There are 630,000 gallons of water, 53 audio-animatronic animals and birds, and 75 audio-animatronic pirates and villagers in the ride, and it takes three days to empty and refill the "bayou" for renovations. Across from the boarding area within the ride is the Blue Bayou Restaurant, made to look like the backyard dinner party of a southern plantation. The restaurant opened the same day as the ride, and is considered one of the original theme restaurants.

The debut of Magic Kingdom at Walt Disney World in 1971 brought many popular rides from Disneyland to the East Coast, but Pirates of the Caribbean was not among them. As the Caribbean region is geographically located near Florida, it was thought a Caribbean-themed ride would not hold the same mystique as it did in California. Instead, the Western River Expedition with Big Thunder Mountain would replace the ride with a similar boat ride and other rides. However, Disney later announced a Florida version of Pirates of the Caribbean instead of the Western River Expedition. The new Pirates of the Caribbean ride opened on December 15, 1973. Additional iterations of Pirates of the Caribbean later opened at Disney parks in Tokyo and Paris.

The opening of the Disney Gallery in 1987 also coincided with the ride's outside queue area being completely redone to improve traffic flows. A bridge walkway was built in front of the entrance to allow crowds to pass through New Orleans Square without causing traffic jams with the guests waiting in line for the ride.

== Ride description ==
=== Walt Disney's original ride ===
The following is a detailed summary of what appears in the original Disneyland version of the Pirates of the Caribbean ride, from 1967 to 2006. An episode of Walt Disney's Wonderful World Of Color shows Walt Disney during the conception stage as well as presenting footage of the ride's opening day. Further details of the history and behind the scenes of the attraction were chronicled in the 2005 book, Pirates of the Caribbean: From the Magic Kingdom to the Movies by Jason Surrell.

The ride begins amid glimmering fireflies during an evening in a Louisiana bayou. Guests board their boats at Laffite's Landing and are at once afloat in the heart of bayou country. Banjo melodies (including "Oh! Susanna" and "Camptown Races") can be heard as guests pass by houseboats, one of whose porches features an old man calmly rocking back and forth in his rocking chair and smoking a pipe. Above a stone archway, a talking skull with crossed swords (voiced by Xavier Atencio) provides words of warning before the guests' boat takes a plunge down a waterfall into a dimly lit cavernous passage, where voices can be heard singing the theme song.

After a second plunge further into the depths of an underground grotto known as Dead Man's Cove, guests behold the skeletal remains of an unfortunate band of pirates, guarding their loot and treasure with macabre delight. During this section, a voice can be heard repeating the phrase "Dead men tell no tales!" The boats glide gently past an old pirate shipwreck, though the helmsman is nothing more than a skeleton doomed to pilot the ship through a thunderstorm. Moving onward, the crew's quarters are complete with skeletal pirates frozen in time – playing chess and drinking rum, one skeleton drinking a bottomless bottle through an exposed rib cage. The Captain's Quarters features a bony corpse examining a treasure map in bed, while an old harpsichord plays the theme song, and a huge amount of treasure being guarded by another skeleton pirate. As guests continue through an empty, dark tunnel, two ominous voices boom from above warning of the cursed treasure and what lies ahead.

Once guests are out of the tunnel, they arrive sometime between the 17th century or the late 1700s, where cannonballs whistle overhead and explosions throw water into the air – a fierce battle in the Caribbean between a marauding pirate galleon, the Wicked Wench, and a Spanish fortress is in full swing. From the deck of the Wicked Wench, the Pirate Captain (modeled on Blackbeard's appearance and voiced by Paul Frees) leads the assault as colonial defenders can be seen manning the fort's cannons, barking orders to each other in English and Spanish and shouting threats at the invading pirates. The village of Puerto Dorado on Isla Tesoro is overrun with pirates in search of treasure. The first sight is the town square, where some pirates have kidnapped the mayor, Carlos (voiced by Paul Frees), and threaten to drown him in a well if he does not divulge the location of the treasure. Carlos' wife (voiced by June Foray) peeks out of an upstairs window, telling him to be brave and not talk; she is shot at as Carlos is repeatedly dunked in the water while a line of other captive city officials look on. An auction scene follows, where an auctioneer pirate (voiced by Paul Frees) tries to sell off the local women with the banner, "Take a Wench for a Bride!" The bidders yell out for the "redhead", a flirtatious woman in a red dress. In the next scene, women are being chased through town by pirates. The "Pooped Pirate" (voiced by Paul Frees) reminisces about the "lively lassie" he wished to "hoist his colors" upon. Holding her slip as he prattles on, the woman peers out from inside a barrel that sat right behind the pirate's back as he keeps boasting, unaware.

Guests then watch carefree, tipsy pirates sing "Yo Ho (A Pirate's Life for Me)" as they succeed in ravaging the town and setting it aflame, filling the night air with an orange glow. Others wallow in the mud, one pirate in particular sleeping with pigs, and a pirate named Old Bill offering rum to stray cats. The boats next float past a dungeon where imprisoned pirates (voiced by J. Pat O'Malley) are doing their best to escape as flames draw near. A small dog just out of the prisoners' reach holds the key to their escape in his teeth; he seems all but immune to the pleas of the pirates trying to coax him closer. One of the pirates holds a noose, hoping to trap the dog. Timbers are smoldering and cracking overhead as riders sail through a storage room filled with gunpowder, cannonballs, and rum-filled, gun-shooting pirates continue singing. A shootout between the inebriated crew and captain of the pirate ship in a flaming ammunition warehouse threatens to demolish the entire village. Finally, at the end of the ride, the boats proceed up a lift hill which passes two pirates trying to lug a treasure chest up the hill. Guests then reach the top of the hill and spill back into the sleepy bayou where the journey began.

=== Disneyland ===
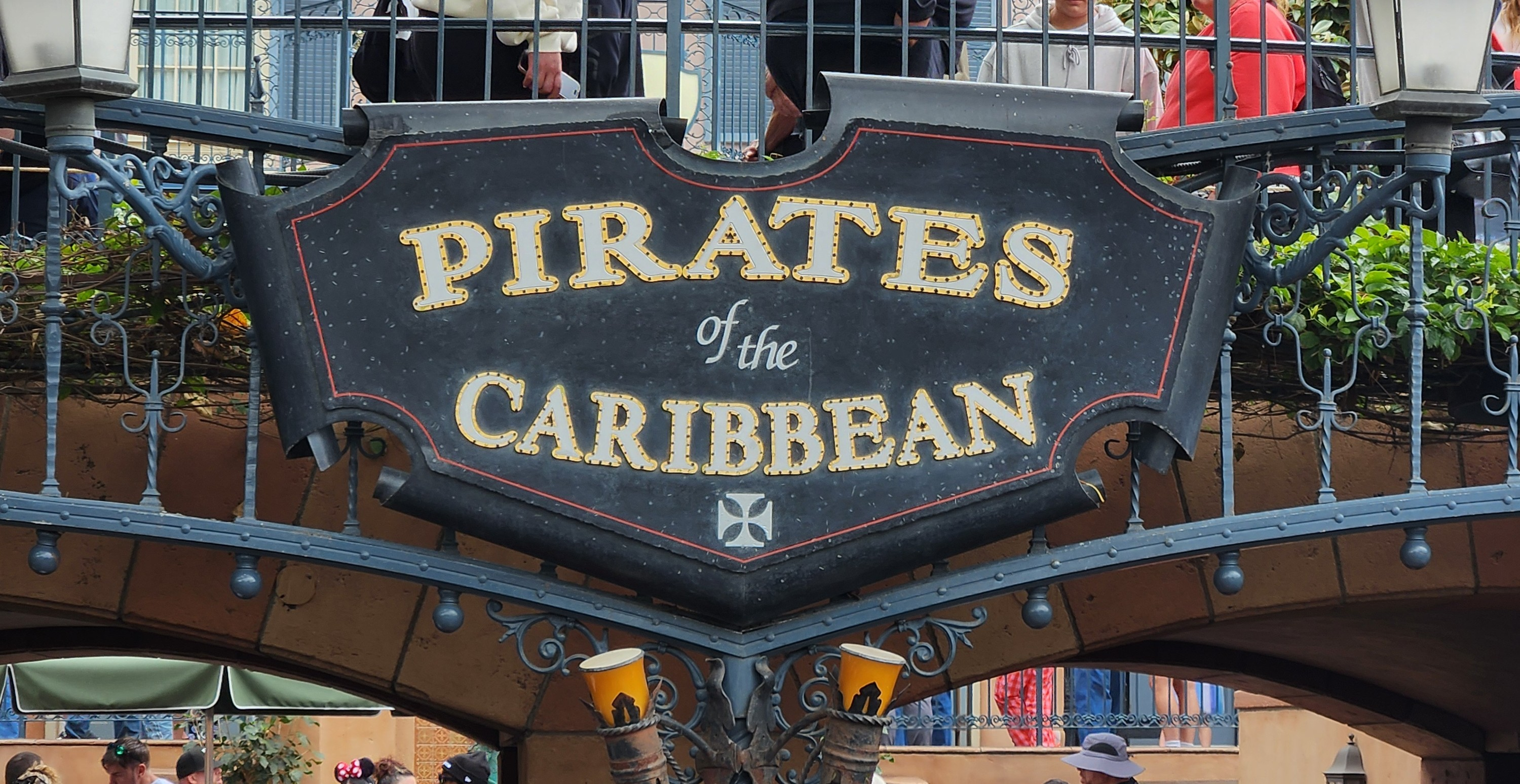
Sign outside the attraction at Disneyland.

Pirates of the Caribbean at Disneyland has gone through many changes and refurbishments over the years, but the ride itself remains the same. Among the changes made was the addition of references to the film franchise, some which have made it to other parks.

=== Magic Kingdom ===
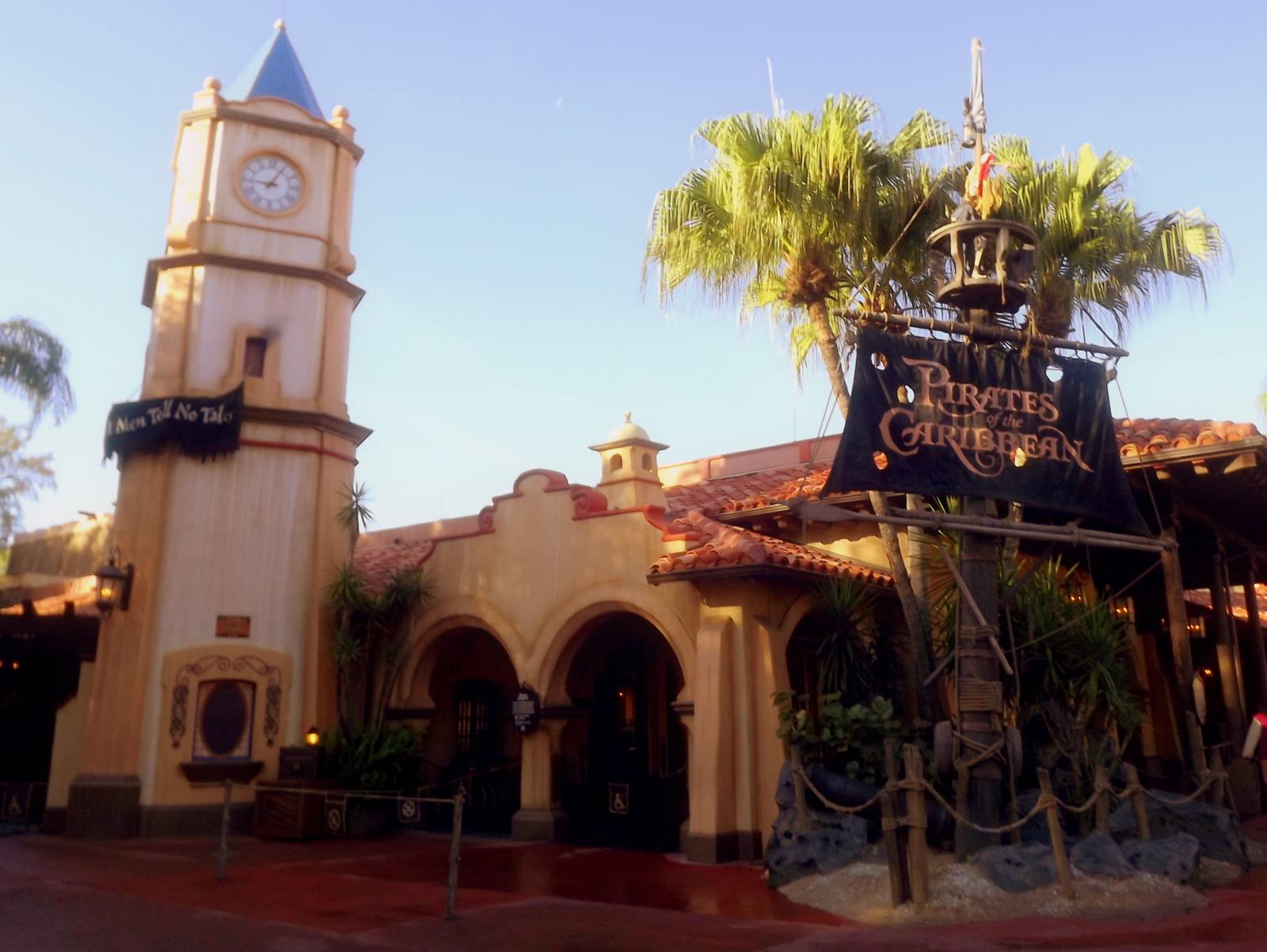
Magic Kingdom's Pirates of the Caribbean

The ride, guarded by the Caribbean watchtower Torre del Sol, is housed in a golden Spanish fort called Castillo Del Morro, inspired by Castillo de San Felipe del Morro in the Old San Juan in Puerto Rico. The queue winds through the fort, passing supplies and cannons, and a pair of pirate skeletons sit at a chessboard. The chess-playing skeletons gag was specifically designed for the Magic Kingdom by Imagineer Marc Davis, who was tasked with designing the ride. There are two queues designed to evoke a different atmosphere, one is the "Soldier" side (the left) and the other is the "Pirate" side (the right, which is now the Lightning Lane queue). Both these queues converge with the loading area known as Pirate's Cove.

At the load area of Pirates' Cove, guests board boats to escape the fortress under siege through a series of tunnels leading out to the bay. A pirate ship can be seen floating out in the distance from the load area. Only two of the skeleton scenes from Disneyland were brought to the Magic Kingdom: The Treasure Chest Beach and Hurricane Beach. A talking skull on the wall delivers a brief safety warning before flashing its eyes, taking a photo of guests in the process. The boat then heads down a 14-foot drop, passing under the Walt Disney World Railroad in the process and dropping down to ground level (the ride actually begins on a second level, and the surrounding Caribbean Plaza is graded to match the rest of the park).

At the bottom, guests pass through a dark passage and pass a battle between a pirate ship and an island fortress. The ride continues as guests pass through a town being ransacked and see a woman shouting down to her husband who is being dunked multiple times into a well in an attempt to get information from him on the location of Captain Jack Sparrow and the treasure. Guests then see Jack hiding behind some women's clothing looking back over his shoulder at the pirates who are searching for him. The boat next passes a scene where guests see townspeople forced to surrender their loot for an auction. Pirates can be heard yelling, "We wants the rum!" Guests go under a bridge and see pirates stealing a treasure chest, and being chased by angry women. A pirate sitting beside his dog holding a key and a treasure map saying that Jack will not be able to find the treasure without his map and key. Guests then see that Jack is behind him hiding in a barrel and looking right at him. On the right is a drunk pirate drinking rum and talking to cats. Guests then pass under another bridge and see that the town is on fire. There are three pirates (one is singing and the others are playing an accordion and a mandolin) who are singing along to the song with a donkey and a dog. Guests see more pirates stealing treasure, singing, and carrying the torches which set the city alight. Guests then begin to pass under a bridge. On the right, there is a pirate on the right passed out and surrounded by pigs and above a pirate dangles his hairy, dirty leg down. As in the Disneyland version, guests see prisoners trying to escape from their jail cell by attempting to lure a dog who has keys in his mouth over to them.

Leaving the jail, guests enter the town's treasure room. Jack Sparrow, having used the key stolen from the Pooped Pirate to open the door, drinks rum and sings "Yo Ho" in victory. The ride then ends as the guests exit by going left, taking a speed-ramp back up to the surface.

=== Disneyland Park (Paris) ===
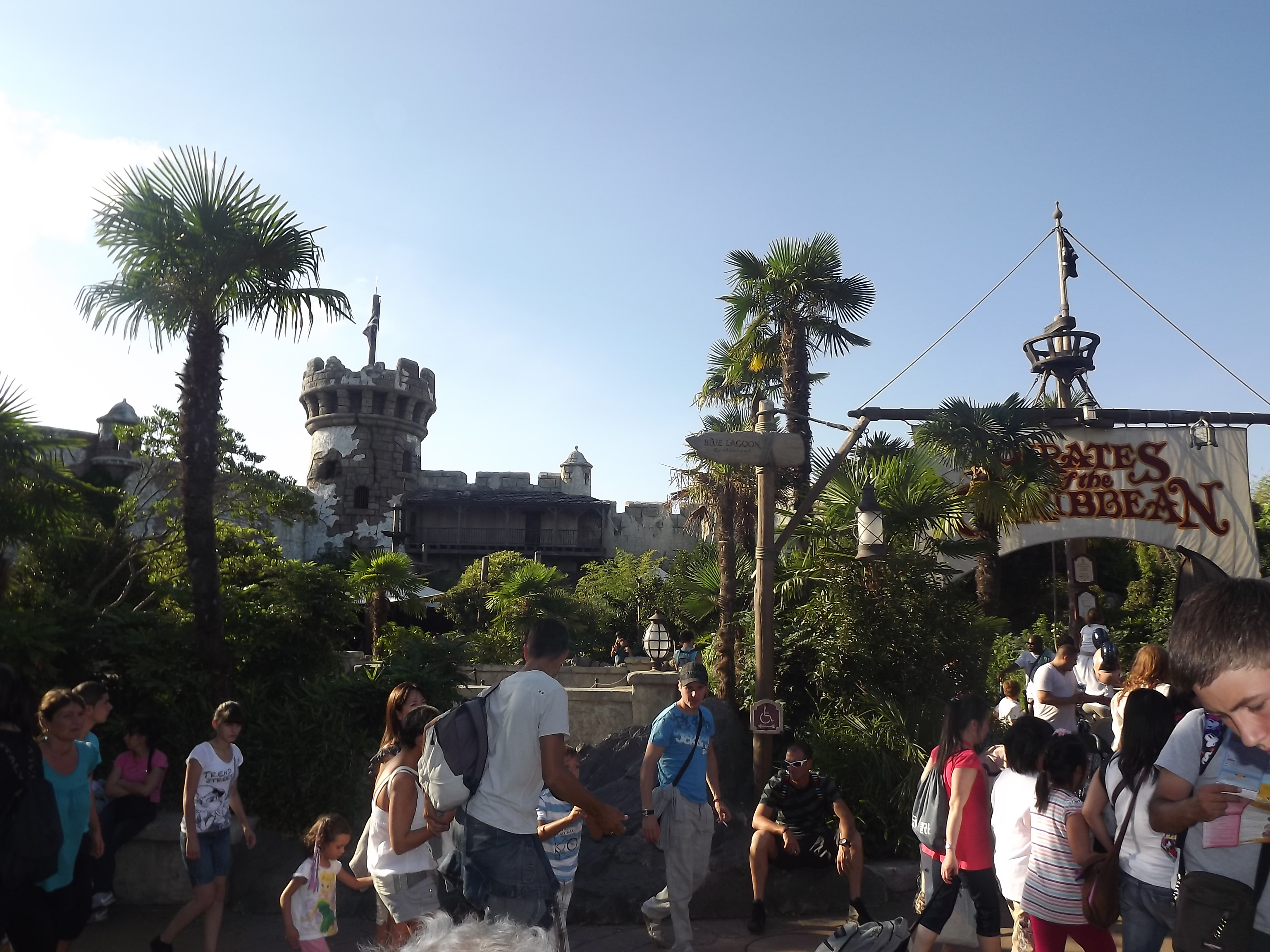
Disneyland Park Paris version

The Pirates of the Caribbean ride at Disneyland Park (Paris) is housed in a battle-scarred fortress at the back of the park. Many of the original scenes are seen in the ride while some new ones were included such as two swordsmen dueling for a woman in the town scene.

=== Shanghai Disneyland ===
Pirates of the Caribbean: Battle for the Sunken Treasure is a separate ride that uses a storyline based on the eponymous film series. It blends digital large-screen projection technology with traditional set pieces and audio animatronics. Walt Disney Imagineering designed the ride and Industrial Light & Magic created the computer-generated visual effects.

== Modifications ==
The Old Bill scene was originally designed in 1972 for the Magic Kingdom version, but the scene was eventually brought to Disneyland, shortly after the Magic Kingdom version opened in 1973.

The Barker Bird that guarded the entrance of the Magic Kingdom's version was originally installed in the unloading area when the ride opened in 1973. However, issues with crowd control and congestion in the unloading area led to it being moved outside of the entrance in 1975, and the 2006 refurbishment relocated the Barker Bird to the World of Disney store until 2012. On August 11, 2024, at D23 2024, Disney announced that a new Pirates of the Caribbean-themed tavern, named The Beak and Barrel featuring a restored Barker Bird named "Rummy", would be opening on August 29, 2025, with reservations, which would be opening on August 20, 2025 in Adventureland at the Magic Kingdom, and the backstory for the lounge bar will be revealed. Imagineers Chris Weck, Senior Creative Director, and Ken Ricci, Executive Creative Development, confirmed that "Rummy" is a descendant of the original Barker Bird.

The loading area of the ride at Magic Kingdom originally had a dual loading system with two channels to double the loading capacity, but the safety concerns over the underwater fin that would dispatch the boats resulted in the decision to use a single channel for both loading docks during a refurbishment made in the fall of 1991. As of 2025, both channels exist, but only one is used.

In 1997, the chase scene of the Disneyland original and Magic Kingdom version, which depicted male pirates chasing women (except for the final scene, where the roles were reversed), was altered, now showing the pirates chasing the women in pursuit of food the women were carrying. The "Pooped Pirate" was recast as the "Gluttonous Pirate", a rogue in search of food, while the woman hiding in the barrel was replaced by a cat.

In Jason Surrell's book Pirates of the Caribbean: From The Magic Kingdom to the Movies, showwriter Francis Xavier "X" Atencio referred to these "softening" touches as "Boy Scouts of the Caribbean".

In 2006, the ride was refurbished again, in order to tie it in with the then-new Pirates of the Caribbean: Dead Man's Chest film. This refurbishment saw the addition of Jack Sparrow (Johnny Depp) animatronics to three individual scenes, as well as Captain Hector Barbossa (Geoffrey Rush) replacing the pirate captain in the battle room and an added waterfall projection of Davy Jones' (Bill Nighy) face in the cave. The "Pooped/Gluttonous Pirate" now held a treasure map in his lap and a magnifying glass in one hand, and other modifications were made to the ride's lighting, audio, dialogue and effects.

The former Blackbeard projection at the Magic Kingdom ride.

To coincide with the release of the 2011 film Pirates of the Caribbean: On Stranger Tides, a projection of Captain Blackbeard from the film (portrayed by original actor Ian McShane) temporarily replaced the 2006 waterfall mist projection of Davy Jones in both the Disneyland and Magic Kingdom versions of the ride, beginning on May 20, 2011.

In late 2012, Disney World added projections of mermaids swimming alongside the boats and a mermaid skeleton while the song "My Jolly Sailor Bold" was played. The mermaid projection effect was removed during a refurb in 2015, as it reportedly did not live up to the designer's expectations. Following the 2018 refurbishment, the mermaid enhancement was removed.

For the 2013 season, new ride vehicles were added to the Magic Kingdom location.

On April 26, 2017, as a promotional event for Pirates of the Caribbean: Dead Men Tell No Tales, one of the Jack Sparrow animatronics were temporarily replaced by a live-action Jack Sparrow portrayed by his film actor Johnny Depp, who surprised and interacted with guests as they passed by. That evening, he also greeted a crowd of guests from the balcony at the ride's entrance.

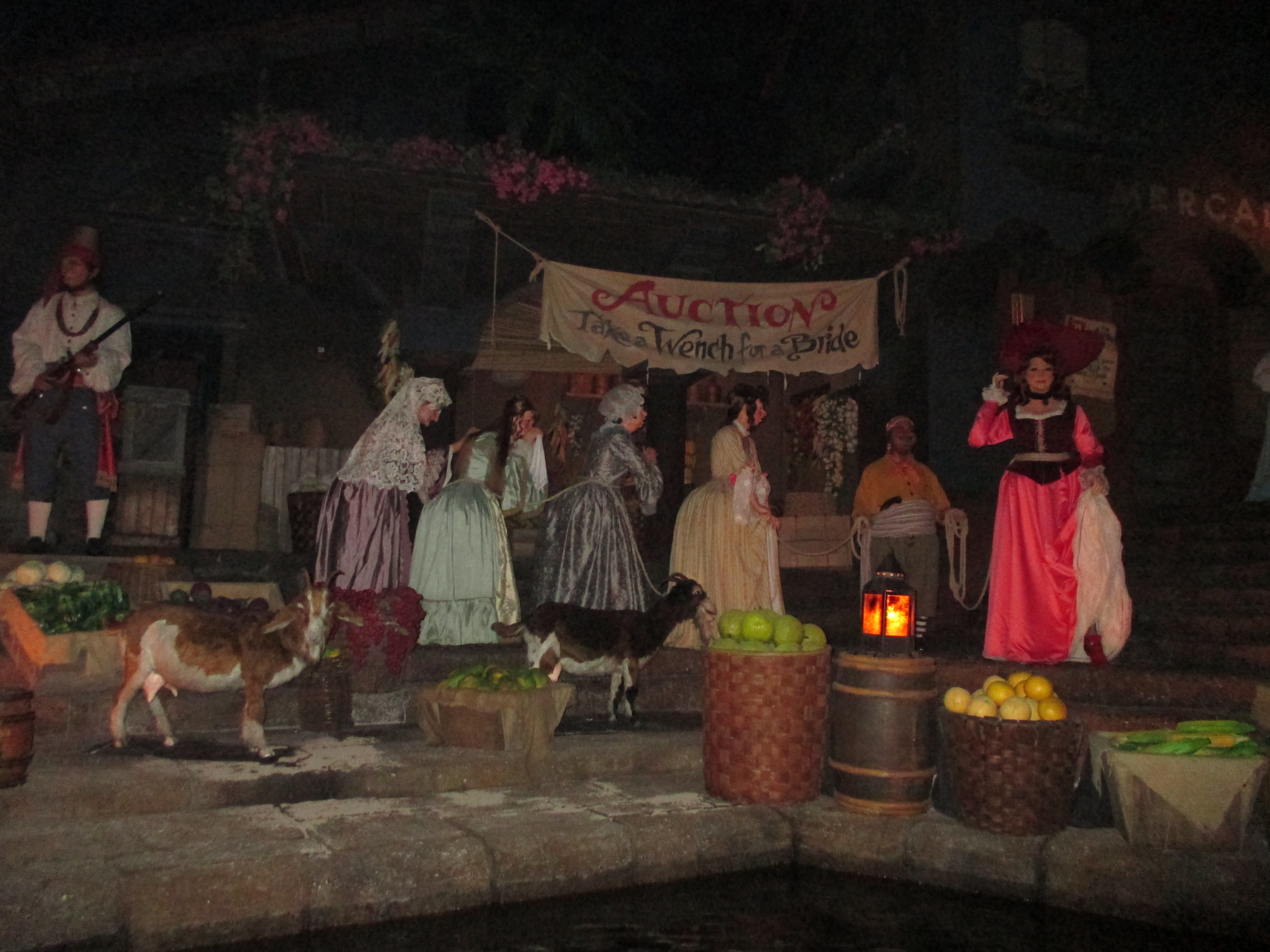
Magic Kingdom's former Pirates of the Caribbean auction scene (1973–2018)

In the same year, the animatronics of Jack Sparrow were added to two scenes in the Disneyland Park Paris version. It was also at that time that Disney reincorporated the talking skull at the Magic Kingdom version.

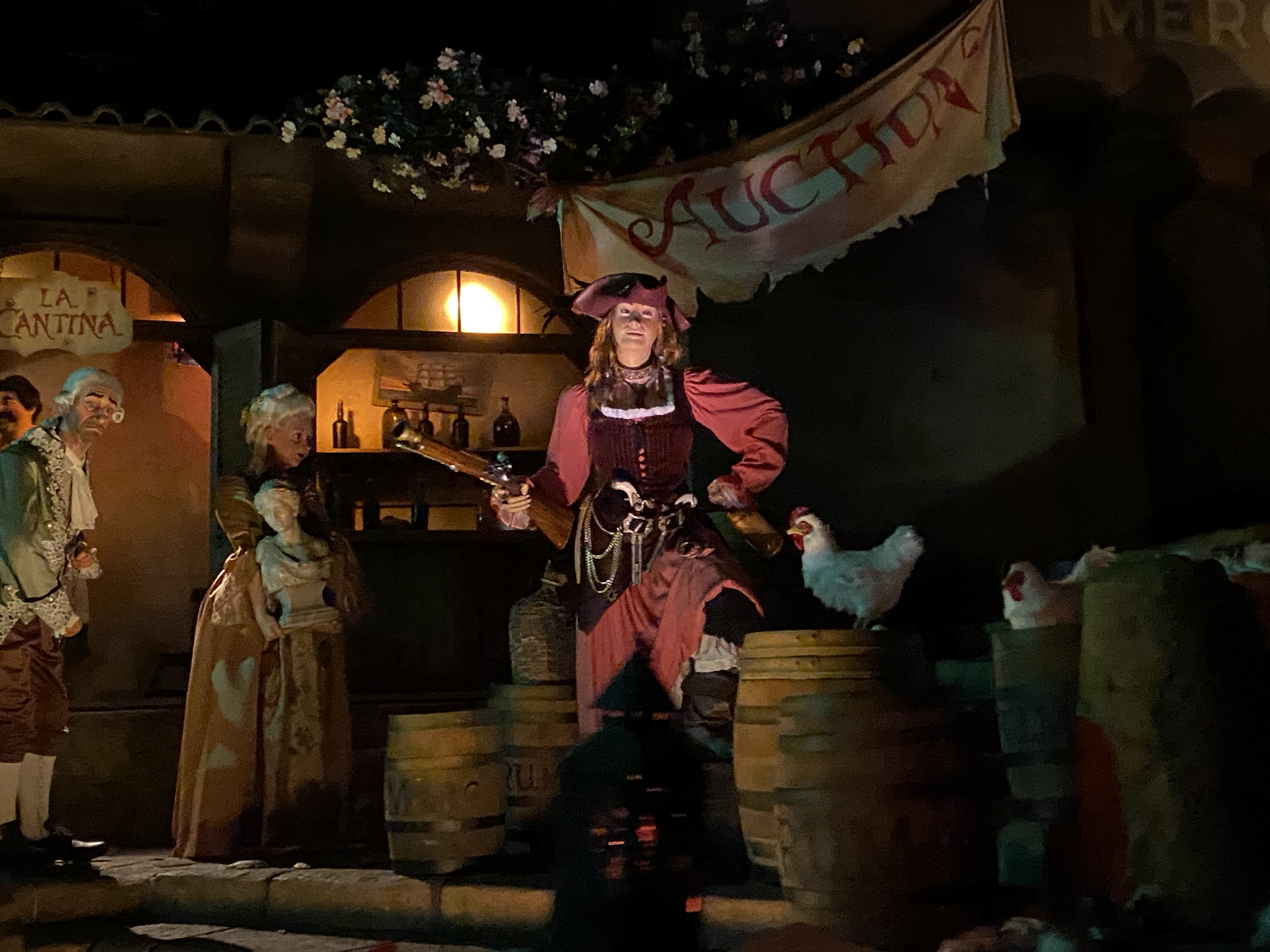
The redheaded pirate, Redd, in Disneyland

Disney made a change to the auction scene at Disneyland Park Paris, Disneyland, and Magic Kingdom, in which the town's women, including the scarlet-clothed redheaded damsel, are auctioned off to the pirates. Instead, the new scene depicts the redhead as a pirate helping the auctioneer sell off loot acquired from the townspeople. The Disneyland Park Paris version reopened on July 24, 2017, with the changes, while also incorporating the animatronic of Captain Barbossa and projected images of Davy Jones and Blackbeard. In 2018, The Magic Kingdom version received the new auction scene in March and Disneyland's version received it in June, after a scheduled refurbishment.

The June 2018 refurbishment at Disneyland also included three changes to the tunnel scene following the treasure cave: the mist waterfall (and Davy Jones/Blackbeard narration) was removed, the original 1967 narration by Paul Frees was reinstated, and a scene was added at the end of the cave, depicting a skeleton transforming into a live pirate as the boat passes by.

After a refurbishment in 2026, the treasure cave scene at Disneyland was updated by replacing the pirate skeleton with an Audio-Animatronics figure of a cursed pirate. Through the use of next-generation projection-mapping technology, the pirate transforms into a skeleton after he picks up a gold coin.

On November 19, 2026, it is announced that Magic Kingdom version of the classic ride will be temporarily closed on January 11, 2027 until it will be reopen at the end of 2027 and make way for the fifth renovations of the ride with new magic and enhancements, instead of new scenes in Adventureland at Magic Kingdom, since the ride has been updated for four times —in 1973, 1997, 2006 and 2018.

== Adaptations ==
In 2003, Disney released Pirates of the Caribbean: The Curse of the Black Pearl, a feature film inspired by the ride starring Johnny Depp as Captain Jack Sparrow in an Oscar-nominated performance. It has been followed by four sequels: Dead Man's Chest (2006), At World's End (2007), On Stranger Tides (2011), and Dead Men Tell No Tales (2017), with the second installment winning an Oscar for Best Visual Effects in 2007. The series has grossed over US$3.7 billion worldwide. These films included numerous allusions to the ride, such as the song "Yo Ho (A Pirate's Life for Me)" being sung, a pirate attack on the town, the Prison Dog jail scene, and several lines from the characters.

At Disneyland and the Magic Kingdom Park of Walt Disney World, the character of Captain Jack Sparrow is occasionally available for photos and autographs, and is further featured in the short show Captain Jack Sparrow's Pirate Tutorial based loosely on the film series. The show is presented in front of or adjacent to the respective park's Pirates of the Caribbean rides and features Captain Jack holding court and enlisting budding pirates to join his crew. Alongside Captain Jack is Mack, his faithful crewman; together they teach the audience how to be a pirate.

A video game by Akella, loosely connected to the first movie's plot, was released to coincide with the film. Worlds based on the Pirates of the Caribbean films appear in the Square Enix games Kingdom Hearts II and III.

In 2000, Pirates of the Caribbean: Battle for Buccaneer Gold opened at DisneyQuest at Florida's Walt Disney World Resort. On this ride, up to five players board a virtual pirate ship to sail around a small 3-D world. Players may fire cannons at other virtual pirate ships; if opposing ships are sunk, their treasure will be "stolen".

Video game developer Ron Gilbert has often said that the ambience for the Monkey Island video game series was partially inspired by the Disney ride. One obvious homage is the prison scene in Monkey Island 2: LeChuck's Revenge, in which the player needs to retrieve the cell key from a dog using a bone. Although the dog in the scene is named Walt, it is named after game artist Steve Purcell's dog and not after Walt Disney.

On May 25, 2007, Pirate's Lair on Tom Sawyer Island opened at Disneyland park on the existing Tom Sawyer's Island section of the park. It features include new additions to the caves. The island also featured a 20-minute stunt show featuring character Captain Jack Sparrow when it first opened.

== Soundtrack ==
=== Releases ===
- The Music of Disneyland, Walt Disney World and Epcot Center "A Pirate's Life for Me"
- Classic Disney Volume 5
- Walt Disney World Resort: The Official Album (1999) "Overture" and "A Pirate's Life for Me"
- Walt Disney World Resort: Official Album (2000) "Overture" and "A Pirate's Life for Me"
- Pirates of the Caribbean (2000) 16-minute "float through," many audio elements from the ride, plus unused music and dialogue
- Walt Disney World Resort Celebrating 100 Years of Magic (2001) "Overture" and "A Pirate's Life for Me"
- A Musical History of Disneyland (2005) 16-minute "float through"
- The Official Album of the Disneyland Resort (2005) 5:45
- Disney Sing-Along Songs series

A version of "A Pirate's Life for Me" can be heard in several Disney theme park fireworks shows:

- Fantasy in the Sky (Magic Kingdom 1999–2003 version)
- Remember... Dreams Come True
- Celebrate! Tokyo Disneyland
- Disney Enchantment (2022 version; snippets only)

== See also ==
- List of Disneyland attractions
- List of Magic Kingdom attractions
- List of Tokyo Disneyland attractions
- List of Disneyland Park (Paris) attractions
