= List of former Disney California Adventure attractions =

Disney California Adventure is the second theme park built at the Disneyland Resort in Anaheim, California, United States. This is a list of attractions – rides, shows, and parades – that have appeared at the park but have permanently closed. Character meets and atmosphere entertainment (e.g., roving musicians) are not listed.

== Sunshine Plaza ==
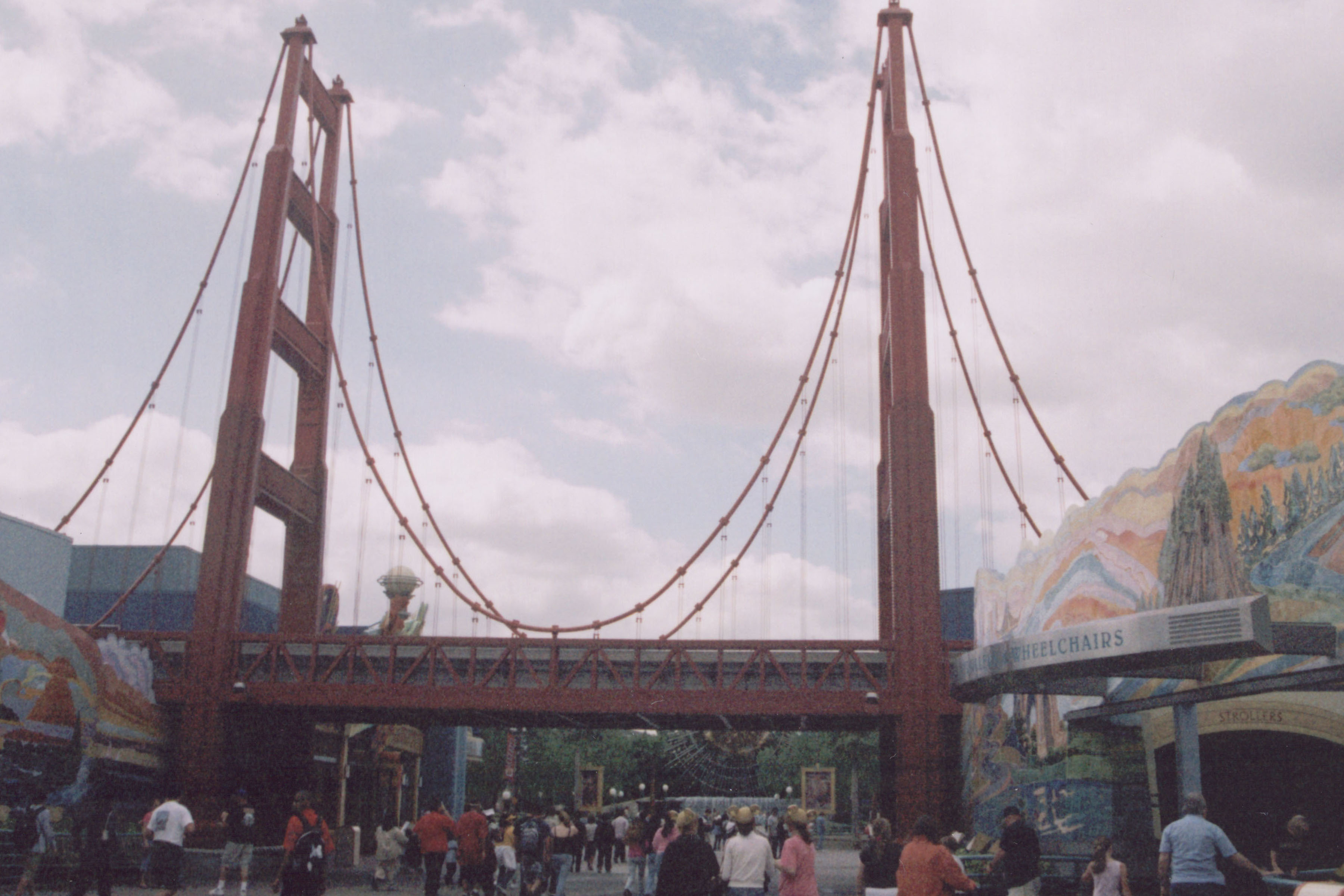
Golden Gate Bridge in Sunshine Plaza c. 2002

2001–2011, Sunshine Plaza: Sunshine Plaza, originally Entry Plaza, was one of the park's original four themed areas. Located at the entrance of the park, Sunshine Plaza was a collection of stores and food service locations. It included an abstract theme meant to evoke the feeling of stepping into a giant postcard. Outside the park's entrance gates were three-dimensional sculptures of letters which spelled out "CALIFORNIA". Giant tile mosaic murals resembling scenes from California lined both sides of the park entrance. A replica of the Golden Gate Bridge served as a façade for the Disneyland Monorail track. The south end of the plaza featured a large sun icon sculpture with a fountain beneath it, which splashed water in a manner reminiscent of ocean waves. Reflectors located around the plaza would reflect real sunlight into the sun icon causing it to gleam in the daytime. The west side of the plaza included a non-functioning replica of the California Zephyr which housed two food service locations. The park's daily parades originally began on the east side of the sun icon.

In 2011, the Sunshine Plaza was closed, renovated, and completely remodeled as part of the park's 2007–2012 redesign and renovation. The California Zephyr locomotive was removed and donated to the Western Pacific Railroad Museum in Portola, California. The sun icon was donated to the city of Anaheim for future use. The "CALIFORNIA" letters were donated to Friends of the California State Fair, a nonprofit organization, and currently sit at the entrance to the CalExpo fairgrounds. The area reopened in 2012 as Buena Vista Street, a representation of Los Angeles in the 1930s. The buildings that housed Sunshine Plaza's stores and restaurants still house stores and restaurants under the present theme, while the sun plaza is now the site of a replica of the Carthay Circle Theater, which houses a restaurant.

== Buena Vista Street ==
2012–2025, Red Car Trolley
The backstage trolley barn was removed to make way for the expansion of Avengers Campus. A trolley remains parked on Buena Vista Street for photo opportunities.

== Hollywood Land ==
Hollywood Land was known as Hollywood Pictures Backlot from 2001 to 2012.

2001–2002, Superstar Limo
A dark ride in which the rider was treated like a new celebrity en route to his/her first movie premiere. The ride vehicles, which evoked limousines, took riders through a cartoonish version of Hollywood, passing by caricature versions of celebrities such as Regis Philbin, Drew Carey, and Whoopi Goldberg. Superstar Limo closed due to low attendance and was the park's first ride to permanently close. It was replaced by Monsters, Inc. Mike & Sulley to the Rescue!, which uses the same ride vehicles and track.
2001–2002, ABC Soap Opera Bistro
A restaurant whose dining areas were replicas of the sets of Port Charles, All My Children, One Life to Live, and General Hospital. Restaurant employees would involve visitors in mock scenarios based on the plot of the respective series. The restaurant and its adjacent store closed due to unpopularity and the entire building was converted to a theater. Playhouse Disney – Live on Stage! opened in the theater in 2003, Disney Junior Live on Stage!, and Disney Junior Dance Party! now plays in the theater.

2001–2004, Who Wants to Be a Millionaire – Play It!

An interactive version of the TV game show Who Wants to Be a Millionaire, except with points awarded instead of dollars. Including the ten players in the "Ring of Fire" seats (which included video screens) down on the stage, the entire audience could play the Fastest Finger qualifying game, in which players had to put answers in a specific order, such as "Put these American cities in order from east to west." The show building, known as Stage 17, is now used for special events.

2003–2010, Playhouse Disney - Live on Stage!
A show featuring puppets and live actors based on programs from the Playhouse Disney programming block on Disney Channel. The show changed over the years as various programs came and went from the Playhouse Disney block. The show was renamed as Disney Junior – Live on Stage! in 2011 after Disney Channel replaced Playhouse Disney with Disney Junior, and continues to play under that name. Disney Junior - Live on Stage closed on 2017 to make way for Disney Junior Dance Party.

2003–2016, Disney's Aladdin: A Musical Spectacular
A show in the Hyperion theater based on the 1992 film Aladdin. The show made its final performance in 2016 and was replaced by Frozen - Live at the Hyperion.

2009–2010, Glow Fest
A nighttime dance party entertainment element. Closed in 2010 and was replaced by ElecTRONica.

2010–2012, ElecTRONica
A nighttime dance party entertainment element based on the Tron franchise. Closed on April 15, 2012, was Replaced by Mad T Party.

2011–2017, Disney Junior – Live on Stage!
A live show featuring characters from various Disney Junior shows. The show closed in 2017 and was replaced by Disney Junior Dance Party!

2012–2016, Mad T Party
A nighttime dance party entertainment element based on Tim Burton's Alice in Wonderland. Closed on March 16, 2016.

2015–2016, For the First Time in Forever: A Frozen Sing-Along Celebration
A show attraction that is part of the Frozen Fun event in the Crown Jewel Theater. The show closed in 2016 and the Crown Jewel Theater was renamed to Sunset Showcase Theater which is used for sneak previews of upcoming Disney films and later used for Mickey's PhilharMagic.

2001–2014, Muppet*Vision 3D
3D film attraction featuring the Muppets. The attraction officially went on hiatus in November 2014, has not returned since then, and has been removed from the Disneyland website. The site is now home to the Sunset Showcase Theater.

2004–2017, The Twilight Zone Tower of Terror
Accelerated drop tower dark ride located at Disney's Hollywood Studios, Disney California Adventure, Tokyo DisneySea, and Walt Disney Studios Park. Exempting the Tokyo version, the attractions are inspired by Rod Serling's anthology television series, The Twilight Zone, and take place in the fictional Hollywood Tower Hotel in Hollywood, California. Closed on January 2, 2017, to be transformed into Guardians of the Galaxy – Mission: Breakout!, which opened in the summer of 2017.

2016–2020, Frozen – Live at the Hyperion
Broadway show based on the 2013 film Frozen. The show closed in 2020 and its queue was subsequently used for a seating area.

2023, Rogers: The Musical
A Broadway production based on the life of fictional Marvel Cinematic Universe character Steve Rogers / Captain America, drawing from various pieces of media as its basis. The show received a limited run at the Hyperion Theater from June 30 to August 31, 2023.

2024, Club Pixar
A New nighttime music festival, based on Disney and Pixar films, during Pixar Fest. The show closed early on June 2, 2024.

2012–2025, Red Car Trolley
a trolley based on the former Pacific Electric railway that began at Buena Vista Street and traveled through Hollywood Land.

2017–2025, Disney Junior Dance Party!

=== Disney Animation Attractions ===
2001–2004, Animation Screening Room
Theater featuring film presentations. Initially presented Back to Neverland, before showing One Man's Dream from 2002 to 2005. Replaced by Turtle Talk With Crush in 2005.
2001–2006, Art of Disney Animation
Live Presentation about Disney Animation with Mushu, the dragon from Mulan. A similar attraction was in Disney's Hollywood Studios. It was replaced by Animation Academy.

== A Bug's Land ==
2001–2010, Bountiful Valley Farm
Section featuring water play area and educational exhibits about agriculture in California. Bountiful Valley Farm was sponsored by Caterpillar Inc. from its opening until 2006; during their sponsorship the area also featured displays of Caterpillar products. The attraction was originally part of the Golden State area and became part of A Bug's Land when Flik's Fun Fair opened in 2002. It closed on September 7, 2010, and is now the site of Mater's Junkyard Jamboree, part of Cars Land.

2001–2018, It's Tough to Be a Bug!

2002–2018, Flik's Flyers
This ride as re-themed as Emotional Whirlwind, themed to Pixar's 2015 film Inside Out. The ride is now located in the area formerly occupied by Maliboomer.

2002–2018, Heimlich's Chew Chew Train

2002–2018, Francis' Ladybug Boogie

2002–2018, Princess Dot Puddle Park

2002–2018, Tuck and Roll's Drive 'Em Buggies

== Cars Land ==
Cars Land opened in June 2012. Inspired by Pixar's 2006 film Cars, it is a 12-acre land that recreates the town of Radiator Springs from the film. The land includes rides, shops, and restaurants.

2012–2015, Luigi's Flying Tires
Guests rode on tire-shaped bumper car vehicles which floated on a cushion of air, similar to an air hockey table. The ride's concept was based on Disneyland's Flying Saucers attraction from the 1960s. Luigi's Flying Tires closed on February 6, 2015. It was replaced by Luigi's Rollickin' Roadsters.

== Golden State ==
2001–2012, Golden State
Golden State was one of the park's original four themed areas, or districts. The sprawling area was divided into six sub-areas, which were themed around several aspects of California and its history: its aviation history (Condor Flats), its national parks (Grizzly Peak Recreational Area), its agricultural industry (Bountiful Valley Farm), its wine industry (Golden Vine Winery), San Francisco (The Bay Area), and Monterey's Cannery Row (Pacific Wharf). Parts of the area were transferred to other lands over the years, and the name was retired in 2012. The original area of Golden State included all of present-day Grizzly Peak, Pacific Wharf, and Condor Flats, and portions of present-day Paradise Pier, A Bug's Land, and Cars Land.

Attractions closed while part of Golden State include:

2001–2008, Golden Dreams
A film presentation hosted by Whoopi Goldberg about the history of the state of California, with a focus on the contributions of individuals and particular ethnic groups. As a result of declining attendance, the movie had its last public performance on September 7, 2008, and the theater building was demolished in July 2009. The Little Mermaid: Ariel's Undersea Adventure was built on the former theater's site and opened on June 3, 2011; the current attraction is part of Paradise Pier. The replica of the Palace of Fine Arts rotunda that stood at the entrance to Golden Dreams was repainted and still stands at the entrance to the present-day attraction.

2001–2008, Seasons of the Vine
A film presentation which took viewers through the journey of wine production in California. The show was originally part of the "Golden Vine Winery" section of the "Golden State" area. The show closed due to low attendance and became the site of Walt Disney Imagineering Blue Sky Cellar. The Blue Sky Cellar closed in 2013 and later became a Disney Vacation Club Welcome Center.

2001–2011, Mission Tortilla Factory
A tour sponsored by Mission Foods consisting of short videos on the history of tortillas, followed by a walkthrough of a working tortilla manufacturing facility and a cooking demonstration. Tortillas manufactured in the facility were served in restaurants in the park, and workers would often distribute free tortilla samples to visitors. The tour closed on May 31, 2011, due to Mission Foods declining to renew their contract with Disney. It was replaced in June 2012 by the Ghirardelli Soda Fountain & Chocolate Shop, hosted by Ghirardelli. The current restaurant is part of San Fransokyo Square.

== Paradise Pier ==
As part of the park's $1.1 billion expansion, Paradise Pier was renovated and re-themed from a modern seaside amusement park reminiscent of the Santa Monica Pier, to a late 1920s Victorian era seaside boardwalk. Many attractions, shops, and restaurants were either removed or rethemed. The original Route 66 section of Paradise Pier was rethemed to fit the new look of the area, with the Route 66 theme being retired.

2001–2010, Maliboomer
A Space Shot ride themed to a high striker game which launched riders 180 feet (55 m) in 4 seconds. Maliboomer closed on September 7, 2010, and was demolished. Its former site (located inside the first helix of the California Screamin roller coaster) is now occupied by Inside Out Emotional Whirlwind, which was formerly Flik's Flyers in A Bug's Land.

2001–2010, S.S. rustworthy
An outdoor play area themed to a run-down fireboat and was sponsored by McDonald's, which was located in the Route 66 section of Paradise Pier. A portion of the play area adjacent to the Orange Stinger/Silly Symphony Swings was closed and demolished in early 2010 as part of that attraction's renovation. The main play area closed on September 7, 2010, and was demolished; its site is now used as a restaurant seating area.

=== Re-themed attractions ===
As part of the 2007–2012 renovation and expansion of Disney California Adventure, the following attractions – all of which were opening day attractions on February 8, 2001 – were renovated and re-themed with a focus on classic Disney characters and/or films; the ride experiences remained mostly unchanged. In 2018, Paradise Pier was again renamed, this time taking on the theme of the Disney-Pixar films, to Pixar Pier.

- Sun Wheel: Ferris wheel inspired by Coney Island's 1927 Wonder Wheel, which featured swinging and stationary gondolas and a large replica of a sun face in the center. The ride closed in October 2008 and reopened as Mickey's Fun Wheel on May 8, 2009. With the retheming of Paradise Pier to Pixar Pier, Mickey's Fun Wheel was again renamed to Pixar Pal-A-Round.
- Orange Stinger: Wave swinger ride inside a giant orange peel. The ride closed in July 2009, the orange peel structure that enclosed it was removed to make an open-air ride, and it reopened as Silly Symphony Swings on May 28, 2010.
- Mulholland Madness: Wild Mouse roller coaster themed to a ride along Southern California roads and was a tribute to Mulholland Drive. The ride closed in October 2010 and reopened as Goofy's Sky School on July 1, 2011.
- California Screamin': was opened in 2001, and it was replaced in 2018 by Incredicoaster.

== Pacific Wharf ==
Pacific Wharf was themed to resemble the old waterfront of Monterey, California as a tribute to its fishing industry. Its attractions were The Bakery Tour and the Walt Disney Imagineering Blue Sky Cellar. This area was primarily an outdoor food court.

In late August 2023, Pacific Wharf was re-themed to San Fransokyo Square. San Fransokyo is a combination of San Francisco and Tokyo, as seen in Disney Animation's 2014 film Big Hero 6.

== Shows and parades ==
=== Parades ===
2001–2002, Disney's Eureka! A California Parade
A parade celebrating diversity and cultures of California.
2001–2010, Disney's Electrical Parade
A nighttime parade featuring floats covered in lights. Originally known as the Main Street Electrical Parade, this parade ran at Disneyland from 1972 to 1996 and at Walt Disney World's Magic Kingdom from 1999 to 2001. After its run at Disney California Adventure ended, the parade relocated back to Disneyland, where it presently runs under its original name.
2005–2008, Block Party Bash
A parade featuring characters and floats based on Pixar films. The parade relocated to Disney's Hollywood Studios after its run at Disney California Adventure ended, and ran there until 2011.
2006–2007, High School Musical Pep Rally
A traveling street show based on the High School Musical film.
2007–2008, High School Musical 2: School's Out!
A traveling street show based on the High School Musical 2 film.
2008–2017, Pixar Play Parade
A replacement for Block Party Bash meant to showcase a wider variety of Pixar films. Moved to Disneyland for "Pixar Fest" in 2018. The parade was spiritually replaced by the similar Better Together: A Pixar Pals Celebration! in 2024.
2008–2010, High School Musical 3 Senior Year!
A traveling street show based on the High School Musical 3: Senior Year film
2011–2014, Phineas and Ferb's Rockin' Rollin' Dance Party
A traveling street show based on the series Phineas and Ferb.

=== Hyperion Theater shows ===
2001, Disney's Steps in Time
Musical revue featuring songs from various Disney films.
2001–2002, The Power of BLAST!
Adaptation of the musical Blast!
2003–2016, Disney's Aladdin: A Musical Spectacular
A musical show based on the 1992 Disney animated film.
2016–2020, Frozen – Live at the Hyperion
A musical show based on the 2013 Disney animated film.
2023, Rogers: The Musical
An limited-time adaptation of the fictional musical from Hawkeye.

=== Others ===
2001, Lights, Camera, Chaos!
Show performed on Backlot Stage in Hollywood Pictures Backlot.
2001, LuminAria
Holiday themed pyrotechnic show presented on Paradise Bay.
2002–2003, Goofy's Beach Party Bash
Show performed on Backlot Stage in Hollywood Pictures Backlot.
2002–2004, Ugly Bug Ball
Insect themed show presented in "A Bug's Land".
2005–2010, Drawn to the Magic
Musical live show presented in Hollywood Pictures Backlot.
2010–2012, Disney Dance Crew
Musical show with contemporary remixes of Disney songs, presented in Hollywood Pictures Backlot

== See also ==
- List of Disney California Adventure attractions
- List of Disneyland attractions
- List of former Disneyland attractions
