= List of Disney California Adventure attractions =

Disney California Adventure is a Disney theme park in Anaheim, California, adjacent to Disneyland and part of the larger Disneyland Resort. It opened on February 8, 2001. Here is a list of the current attractions found therein, arranged by "land" and with brief descriptions. These are only attractions from the Disney California Adventure itself, not from Disneyland park or other parts of the Disneyland Resort, and that parades and character meets are not listed in this article. (The term "attractions" is used by Disney as a catch-all term for rides, shows, and exhibits.) Disney California Adventure currently has 34 attractions in the theme park.

== Hollywood Land ==
- Hyperion Theater
- Disney Jr. Mickey Mouse Clubhouse Live!
- Mickey's PhilharMagic
- Monsters, Inc. Mike & Sulley to the Rescue!
- Disney Animation:
  - Animation Academy
  - Sorcerer's Workshop
  - Turtle Talk with Crush

== Avengers Campus ==
- Guardians of the Galaxy – Mission: Breakout!
- Web Slingers: A Spider-Man Adventure

=== Future attractions ===
- Avengers Infinity Defense
- Stark Flight Lab

== Cars Land ==
- Luigi's Rollickin' Roadsters
- Mater's Junkyard Jamboree
- Radiator Springs Racers

== San Fransokyo Square ==
- The Bakery Tour

== Pixar Pier ==
- Games of Pixar Pier
- Jessie's Critter Carousel
- Inside Out Emotional Whirlwind
- Incredicoaster
- Pixar Pal-A-Round
- Toy Story Midway Mania!

=== Future attractions ===
- Coco attraction

== Paradise Gardens Park ==
- Golden Zephyr
- Goofy's Sky School
- Jumpin' Jellyfish
- The Little Mermaid: Ariel's Undersea Adventure
- Silly Symphony Swings
- World of Color

== Grizzly Peak ==
- Grizzly River Run
- Soarin' Across America
- Redwood Creek Challenge Trail

== Upcoming areas ==
- Avatar Area

== See also ==
- List of former Disneyland attractions
- List of former Disney California Adventure attractions
- List of Disneyland attractions
