= Paradise Gardens Park =

Themed land at the Disney California Adventure theme park

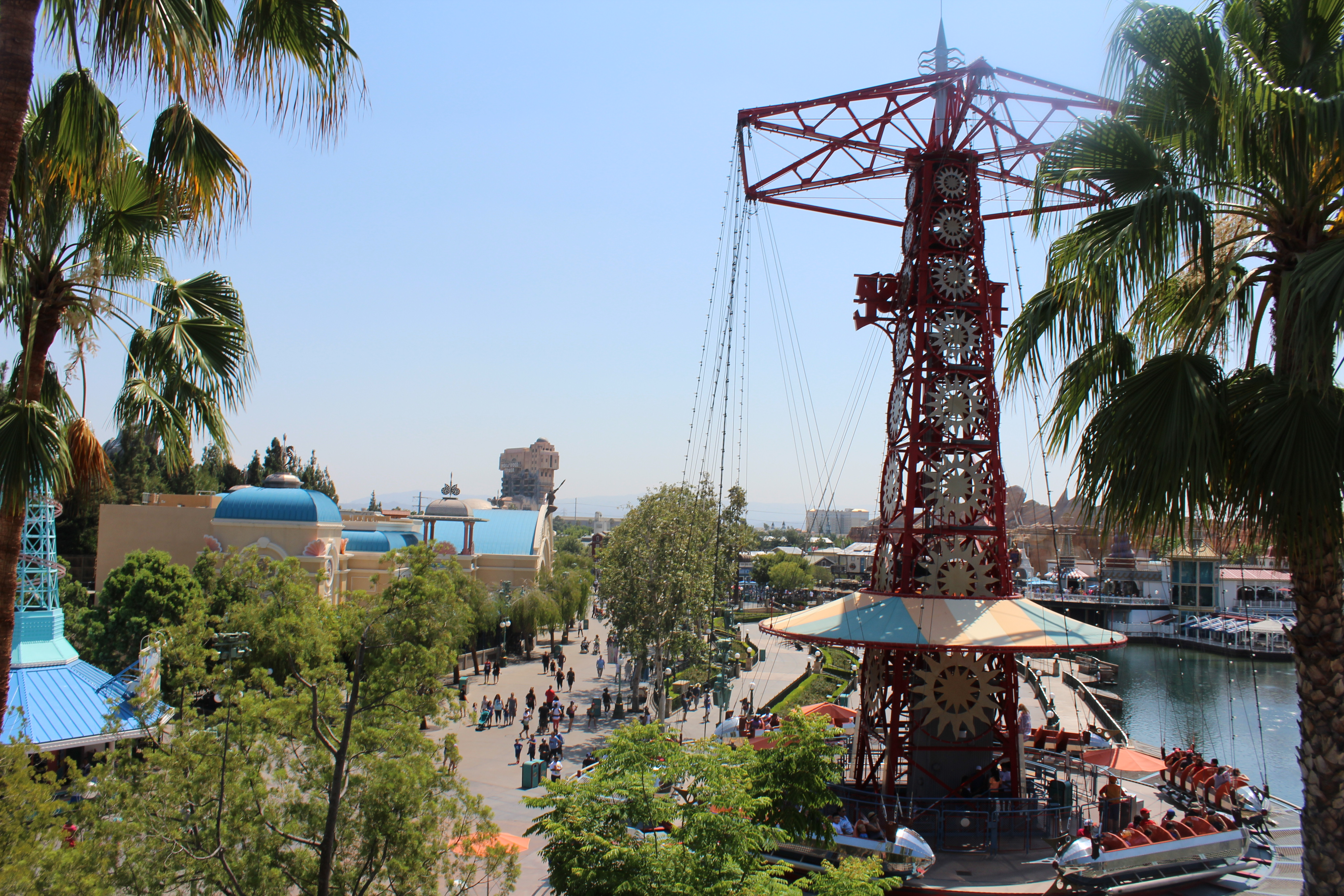
- The area in 2016
- Interactive map of Paradise Gardens Park
- Theme: A Victorian era seaside amusement park

Attractions
- Total: 5
- Roller coasters: 1
- Other rides: 4
- Shows: 1

Disney California Adventure
- Coordinates: 33°48′18″N 117°55′20″W
- Status: Operating
- Opened: February 8, 2001 (as Paradise Pier); June 23, 2018 (as Paradise Gardens Park)
- Closed: June 22, 2018 (as Paradise Pier)

Paradise Gardens Park is a themed land at Disney California Adventure.

The area opened as Paradise Pier in 2001 along with the rest of the theme park. In 2010, World of Color and Silly Symphony Swings were added. To complete the Paradise Pier makeover, Disney opened Goofy's Sky School (a retheme of Mulholland Madness) and The Little Mermaid ~ Ariel's Undersea Adventure (replacing Golden Dreams).

Part of Paradise Pier was reimagined into Pixar Pier, which opened on June 23, 2018. The area that includes Paradise Gardens, Goofy's Sky School, Silly Symphony Swings, Jumpin' Jellyfish, Golden Zephyr, and The Little Mermaid ~ Ariel's Undersea Adventure was renamed Paradise Gardens Park.

== History ==
When the park first opened in 2001, Paradise Pier originally resembled a modern seaside amusement park, similar to that of the Santa Monica Pier, or Santa Cruz Boardwalk. As part of the Disney California Adventure $1.1 billion expansion project, Paradise Pier was re-themed to evoke the charm of Victorian era seaside amusement parks of the 1920s.

The Orange Stinger underwent extensive re-theming to become Silly Symphony Swings, based on Walt Disney's 1935 short film The Band Concert. Silly Symphony Swings opened on May 28, 2010. Cosmetic changes were also made to California Screamin': the Mickey Mouse silhouette was altered to represent a sunburst pattern, with a large Paradise Pier sign hanging above the loop, and the scream tubes were also repainted a darker shade of blue.

Walt Disney Imagineering created World of Color, a new nighttime spectacular featuring fountains and projection effects, for Paradise Bay. An area on the northern waterfront was repurposed into a viewing area for the show, known as Paradise Park. World of Color premiered on June 11, 2010, and plays nightly.

The Little Mermaid ~ Ariel's Undersea Adventure—which replaced Golden Dreams—opened June 3, 2011. As of November 2010, Mulholland Madness was closed and reopened July 1, 2011, as Goofy's Sky School, inspired by Walt Disney's 1940 short film Goofy's Glider.

On June 23, 2018, part of Paradise Pier become Pixar Pier, inspired by films from Pixar Animation Studios. California Screamin' became the Incredicoaster, Mickey's Fun Wheel opened as the Pixar Pal-A-Round, with Pixar characters on its gondolas. The Luxo Jr. animatronic was installed on the top of Pixar Pier's marquee, four months later, in October. Jessie's Critter Carousel opened in 2019 replacing King Triton's Carousel of the Sea. The Maliboomer closed in 2010 and was unused garden space until it was replaced by the Inside Out Emotional Whirlwind attraction in 2019.

=== Attractions ===
- Goofy's Sky School
- Silly Symphony Swings
- Jumpin' Jellyfish
- Golden Zephyr
- The Little Mermaid ~ Ariel's Undersea Adventure

=== Restaurants ===
- Bayside Brews
- Corn Dog Castle

=== Shops ===
- Seaside Souvenirs

=== Nighttime Spectaculars ===
- World of Color (2010–2023; Returning in February 2027)
  - World of Color: Celebrate! The Wonderful World of Walt Disney (2015–2016)
  - World of Color: ONE (2023–2025, 2026–present)
  - World of Color: Happiness! (2025–2026)

=== Seasonal Shows & Park Entertainment ===
- Oogie Boogie Bash (seasonals)
  - Frightfully Fun Parade (2019—2025)
  - Madame Leota’s Swinging Wake – A Haunted Mansion Street Party (2026-present)
- Disney Festival of Holidays (seasonals)
  - Holiday Toy Drummers
  - Mickey's Happy Holidays
- Lunar New Year (seasonals)
  - Mulan's Lunar New Year Procession
- Disney California Adventure Food & Wine Festival (seasonals)
  - Jammin' Chefs

== Retired features ==
=== Former attractions ===
- Disney's LuminAria: A holiday themed pyrotechnics show on Paradise Bay. Guest were invited to design holiday greeting cards at a special LuminAria greeting card making station inside the park, in which select cards would be used and presented during the actual show. The show was only presented during the holiday season of 2001, due to the intense amount of smoke the show would generate, and its proximity to park guests. Although the show was never presented again after 2001, a mirrored "island" structure which was used in the show remained in the center of "Paradise Bay" for several years.
- Disney's Electrical Parade: the second to last version of the Main Street Electrical Parade in the west coast which opened with Disney California Adventure in February 2001, and was shipped to Florida in 2010.
- Mulholland Madness: a "wild mouse" rollercoaster themed to California freeways. The ride was closed in 2010 and re-themed as "Goofy's Sky School".
- Orange Stinger: a swing ride inside a giant orange peel structure, which featured seats shaped like bees, and an orange scent inside the ride. The bee shaped seats were removed shortly after park opening due to being damaged from seats bumping into each other, and the orange scent was discontinued after it was attracting real bees. The ride was closed in 2009 and extensively remodeled. The giant orange peel structure was completely removed, and the ride was renamed "Silly Symphony Swings".
- S.S. rustworthy: an outdoor play area themed to a run-down fireboat, which was located in the "Route 66" section of Paradise Pier. A portion of the play area adjacent to the Orange Stinger/Silly Symphony Swings was closed and demolished in early 2010 as part of that attraction's renovation. The main play area closed on September 7, 2010, and was demolished; its site is now used as seating area for the Paradise Garden Grill and Boardwalk Pizza & Pasta restaurants.
- Lilo & Stitch's Ohana Luau: a small show featuring Lilo and Stitch from the 2002 Disney animated film Lilo & Stitch.
- Golden Dreams: a film presentation hosted by Whoopi Goldberg about the history of the state of California, with a focus on the contributions of individuals and particular ethnic groups. The attraction was located in "The Bay Area" section of the park. As a result of declining attendance, the movie had its last public performance on September 7, 2008, and the theater building was demolished in July 2009. "The Little Mermaid: Ariel's Undersea Adventure" was built on the former theater's site and opened on June 3, 2011; the current attraction is part of Paradise Gardens Park. The replica of the Palace of Fine Arts rotunda that stood at the entrance to Golden Dreams was repainted and still stands at the entrance to the present-day attraction.

=== Former shops and restaurants ===
- Burger Invasion : a former burger restaurant which was sponsored by McDonald's Corporation, and served McDonald's food. After the sponsorship was not renewed in 2010, the building was closed and renovated in 2011. The location was renamed "Paradise Garden Grill", with new Mediterranean inspired décor.
- Pizza Oom Mow Mow: renovated in 2011 and renamed "Boardwalk Pizza & Pasta".
- Dinosaur Jack's Sunglass Shack: a Route 66 themed sunglass shop inside a pink dinosaur-shaped building, located next to "Muholland Madness". The building was painted green in 2009, and was later completely demolished in 2011.
- Avalon Cove By Wolfgang Puck: a fine dining restaurant sponsored by Wolfgang Puck. The sponsorship was dropped eight months after the park first opened due to low revenues. The restaurant was renamed "Ariel's Grotto".
- Souvenir 66: a Route 66 themed souvenir stand. The location was repainted and re-themed in 2011, and renamed "Seaside Souvenirs".
