= Golden Zephyr =

Attraction at Disney California Adventure

Coordinates: 33°48′21.46″N 117°55′20.09″W

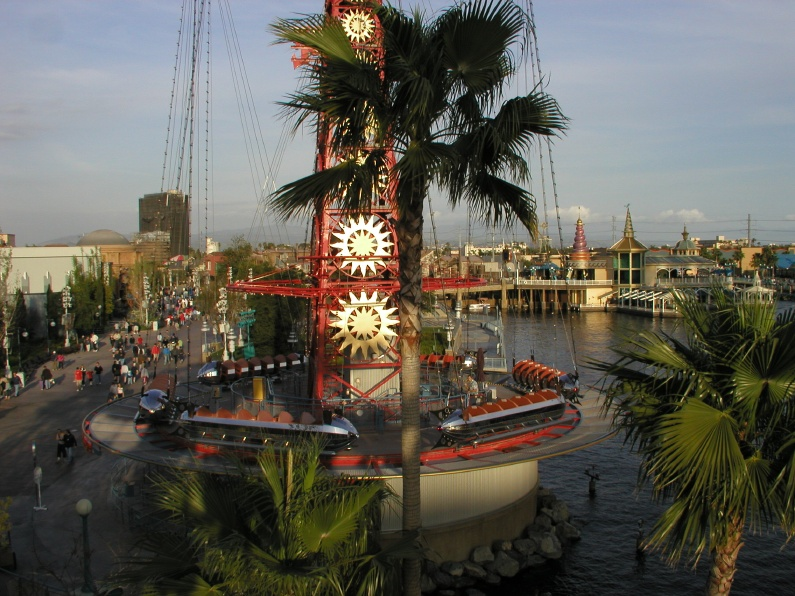

Disney California Adventure
- Area: Paradise Pier (2001–2018); Paradise Gardens Park (2018–present)
- Status: Operating
- Opening date: February 8, 2001

Ride statistics
- Manufacturer: D. H. Morgan Manufacturing
- Designer: Walt Disney Imagineering
- Theme: Seaside Boardwalk, 1920s Era
- Height: 90 ft (27 m)
- Vehicle type: Rocket
- Vehicles: 6
- Riders per vehicle: 12
- Rows: 6
- Riders per row: 2
- Duration: 1:30
- Must transfer from wheelchair

Golden Zephyr is an attraction at Paradise Gardens Park in Disney California Adventure Park built by D. H. Morgan Manufacturing. Themed to the Buck Rogers and Flash Gordon style rocket ships, it takes park guests on a relaxing trip. Unlike its cousins Dumbo and the Astro Orbiter next door in Disneyland, the Golden Zephyr rockets are controlled by centripetal motion over Paradise Bay and can not be automatically controlled to go up and down.

The Golden Zephyr's design comes from the Harry Traver Circle-Swing rides of the early 20th century, specifically the Aerostat / Strat-O-Stat ride that operated at Riverview Park in Chicago. In designing the ride, Disney engineers visited Pleasure Beach in Blackpool, England to examine the Captive Flying Machines, a similar, but much larger, ride designed by Sir Hiram Maxim, and which has operated there since 1904.

The ride cannot operate at constant wind speeds over 10 miles per hour (16 km/h), or gusts over 15 miles per hour (24 km/h). Neither this attraction, nor Jumpin' Jellyfish were removed or changed as part of the billion-dollar expansion.
