= Walt Disney Imagineering Blue Sky Cellar =

Former exhibit at Disney California Adventure

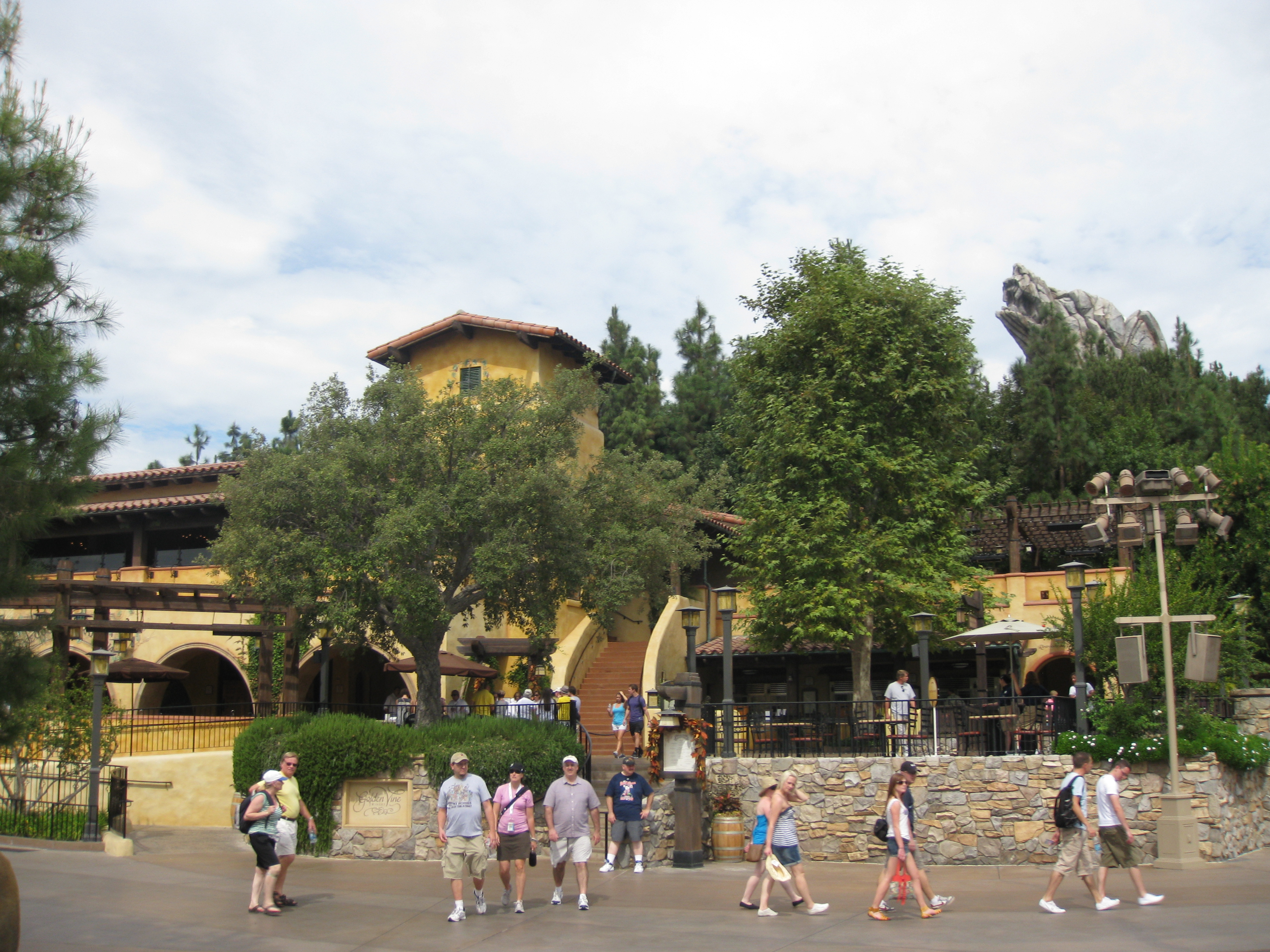

Disney California Adventure
- Area: Pacific Wharf
- Status: Removed
- Opening date: October 20, 2008
- Closing date: March 14, 2020
- Replaced: Seasons of the Vine
- Replaced by: Golden Vine House (Disney Vacation Club Welcome Center)

Ride statistics
- Attraction type: Walkthrough exhibit

Walt Disney Imagineering Blue Sky Cellar was a preview center which opened October 20, 2008 replacing the Seasons of the Vine Theater at Disney California Adventure at the Disneyland Resort in Anaheim, California.

The preview center was used to promote upcoming attractions coming to the park, such as the dark ride The Little Mermaid: Ariel's Undersea Adventure, Goofy's Sky School roller coaster, Buena Vista Street and the Cars Land themed areas. The exhibit often showed a preview film that featured Imagineers talking about the upcoming attractions, which was updated routinely as construction progressed.

Walt Disney Imagineering Blue Sky Cellar was officially closed on March 14, 2020 and was later replaced by a Disney Vacation Club Welcome Center.
