= Palace of Fine Arts =

Monumental structure in San Francisco, US

- U.S. National Register of Historic Places
- U.S. Historic district
- San Francisco Designated Landmark
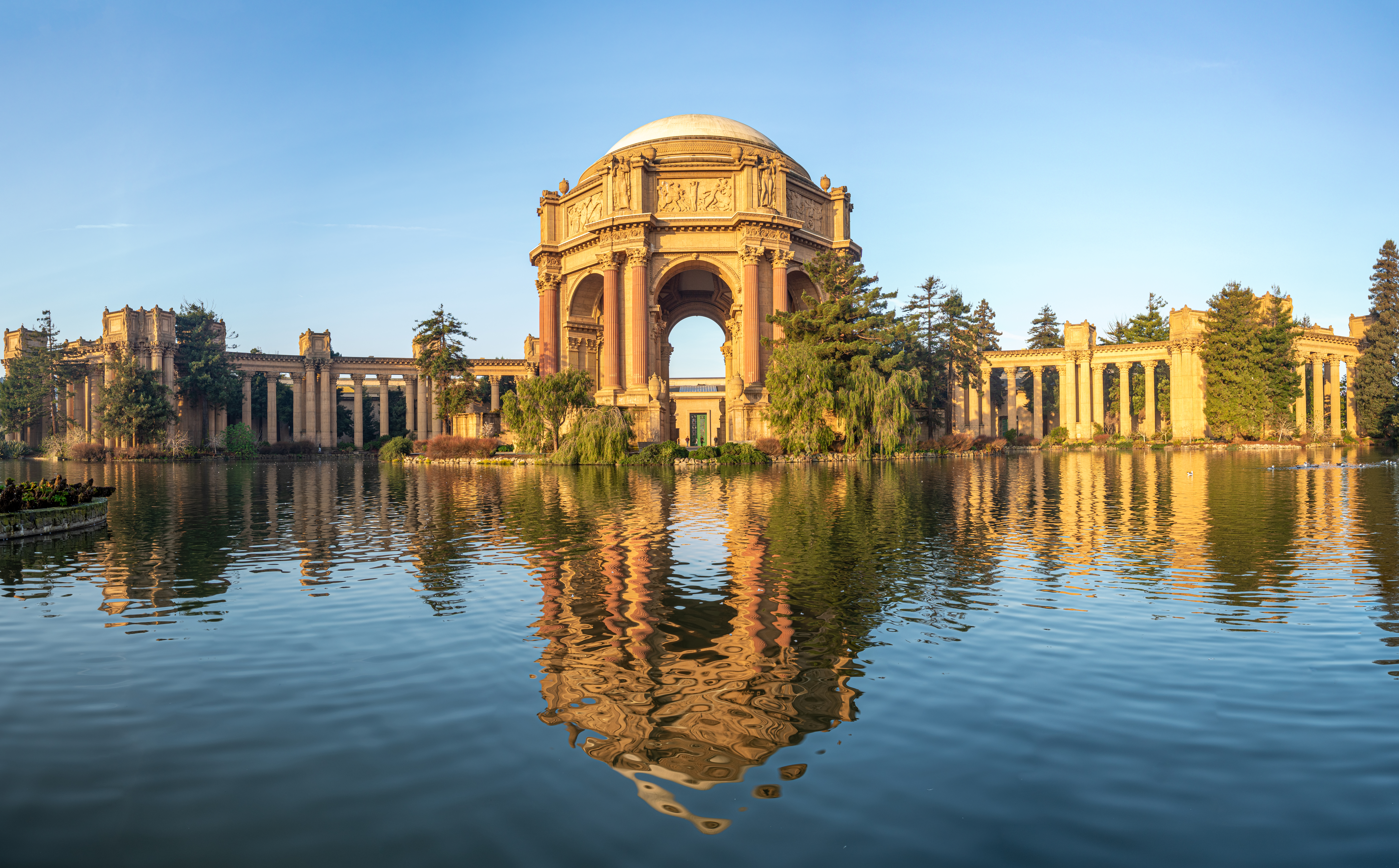
- The Palace of Fine Arts, 2020

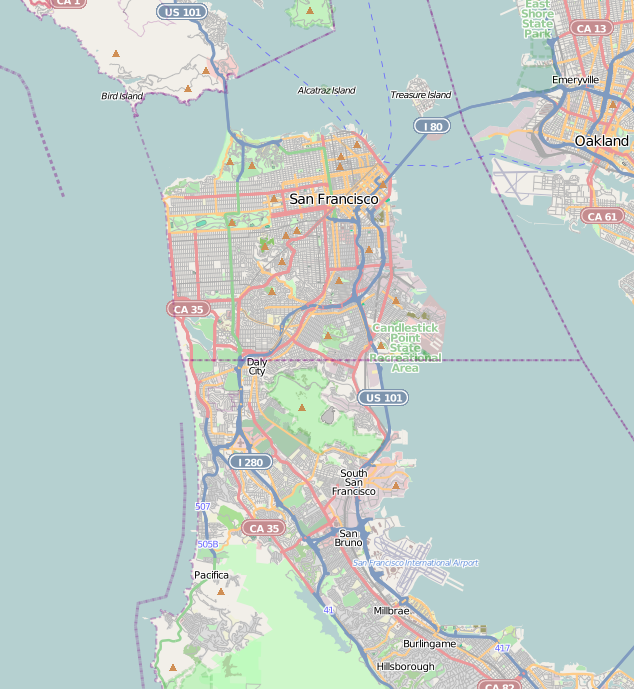
- Location within San Francisco Location within California Location within the United States
- Location: 3301 Lyon St., San Francisco, California
- Coordinates: 37°48′10″N 122°26′54″W
- Area: 17 acres (6.9 ha)
- Architects: William Gladstone Merchant; Bernard Maybeck
- Architectural style: Beaux-Arts
- Website: https://palaceoffinearts.com/
- NRHP reference No.: 04000659
- SFDL No.: 88

Significant dates
- Added to NRHP: December 5, 2005
- Designated SFDL: 1977

The Palace of Fine Arts is a monumental structure located in the Marina District of San Francisco, California, United States, originally built for the 1915 Panama–Pacific International Exposition to exhibit works of art. It is the only structure from the exposition that survives on site, though it was completely rebuilt from 1964 to 1974.

Conceived to evoke a decaying ruin of ancient Rome, the Palace of Fine Arts became one of San Francisco's most recognizable landmarks. The most prominent building of the complex, a 162-foot-high (49-meter) open rotunda, is enclosed by a lagoon on one side and adjoins a large, curved exhibition center on the other side, separated from the lagoon by colonnades. As of 2019, the exhibition center (one of San Francisco's largest single-story buildings) was in use as a venue for events such as weddings or trade fairs.

Early 2009 marked the completion of a renovation of the lagoons and walkways and a seismic retrofit.

== History ==
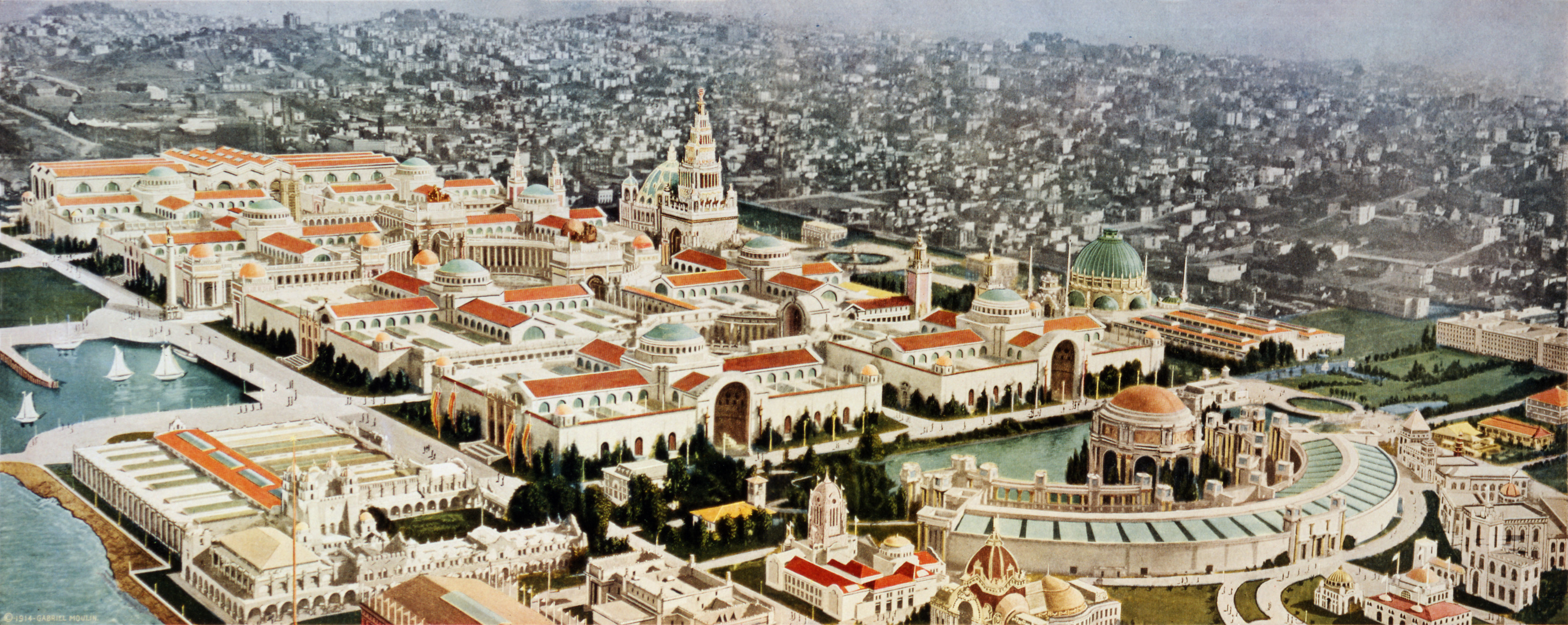
Aerial view of the Panama–Pacific International Exposition, directed southeast. The exposition buildings have been colored to distinguish them; the Palace of Fine Arts can be seen on the lower right.

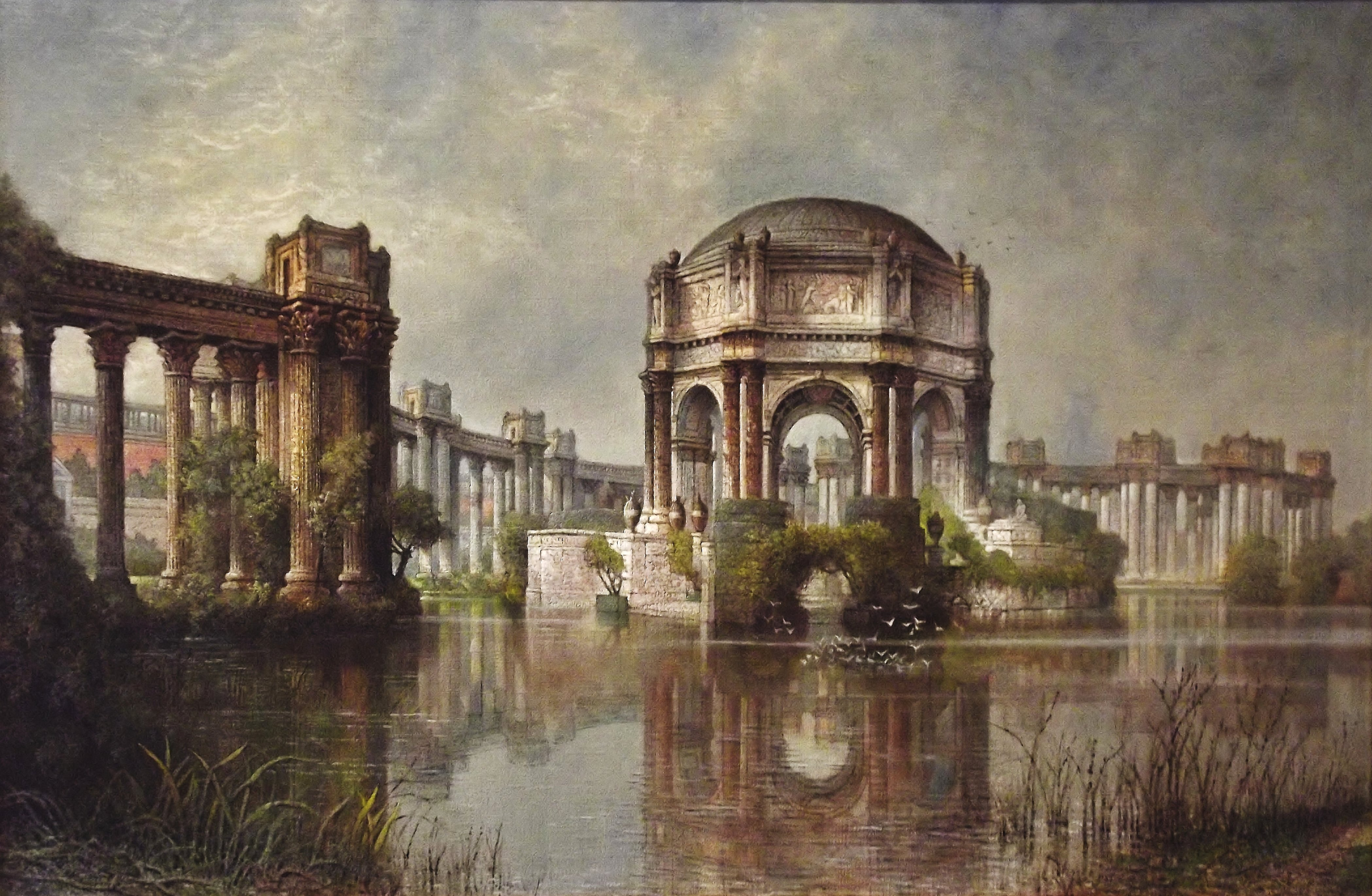
Painting of the Palace of Fine Arts by Edwin Deakin c. 1915

The Palace of Fine Arts was one of ten palaces at the heart of the Panama–Pacific International Exposition. The exhibition also included the exhibit palaces of Education, Liberal Arts, Manufactures, Varied Industries, Agriculture, Food Products, Transportation, Mines, and Metallurgy, and the Palace of Machinery. The Palace of Fine Arts was designed by Bernard Maybeck. He was tasked with creating a building that would serve as a quiet zone where exhibition attendees could pass through between visiting the crowded fairgrounds and viewing the paintings and sculptures displayed in the building behind the rotunda. Maybeck designed what was essentially a fictional ruin from another time. He took his inspiration from Roman and Ancient Greek architecture (specifically Piranesi's etching of the remnants of the so-called Temple of Minerva Medica in Rome), and also from Böcklin's Symbolist painting Isle of the Dead.

According to a metal plate at the rotunda, it was rebuilt under B.F. Modglin, local manager of MacDonald & Kahn, between 1964 and 1967. In the years 1973 and 1974, the columniated pylons were added.

While most of the exposition was demolished when the exposition ended, the Palace was so beloved that a Palace Preservation League, founded by Phoebe Apperson Hearst, was founded while the fair was still in progress.

For a time after the Exhibition, the Palace housed a continuous art exhibit, and during the Great Depression, Works Progress Administration artists were commissioned to replace the decayed Robert Reid murals on the ceiling of the rotunda. From 1934 to 1942 the exhibition hall was home to eighteen lighted tennis courts. During World War II, it was requisitioned by the military for the storage of trucks and jeeps. At the end of the war, when the United Nations was created in San Francisco, limousines used by the world's statesmen came from a motor pool there. From 1947 on, the hall was put to various uses: as a city Parks Department warehouse; as a telephone book distribution center; as a flag and tent storage depot; and even as temporary Fire Department headquarters.

While the Palace had been saved from demolition, its structure was not stable. Originally intended to only stand for the duration of the Exhibition, the colonnade and rotunda were not built of durable materials, and thus framed in wood and then covered with staff, a mixture of plaster and burlap-type fiber. As a result of the construction and vandalism, by the 1950s the simulated ruin was a crumbling ruin.

In 1958, following a successful drive to save and restore the building, lead by businesseman and philanthropist Walter Johnson and then-state assemblyman Caspar Weinberger, the Californian state legislature agreed to provide $2 million to fund the reconstruction of the Palace, with a further two million donated to the project by Johnson.

In 1964, the original Palace was completely demolished, with only the steel structure of the exhibit hall left standing. The buildings were then reconstructed until 1974 in permanent, lightweight, poured-in-place concrete, and steel I-beams were hoisted into place for the dome of the rotunda. All the decorations and sculptures were constructed anew, local sculptor Spero Anargyros created many of the larger sculptures. The only changes were the absence of the murals in the dome, two end pylons of the colonnade, and the original ornamentation of the exhibit hall.

In 1969, the former Exhibit Hall became home to the Exploratorium interactive museum, and, in 1970, also became the home of the 966-seat Palace of Fine Arts Theater. On October 6, 1976, the Palace of Fine Arts hosted the second presidential debate between Gerald Ford and Jimmy Carter. In 2003, the City of San Francisco along with the Maybeck Foundation created a public-private partnership to restore the Palace and by 2010 work was done to restore and seismically retrofit the dome, rotunda, colonnades, and lagoon. Within January 2013, the Exploratorium closed in preparation for its permanent move to the Embarcadero.

In 1992 and 1996, the popular U.S. game show Wheel of Fortune taped shows at the Palace for broadcast in November.

In April 2020, during the coronavirus pandemic, plans were announced to convert the Palace of Fine Arts into a temporary shelter for 162 homeless people. The decision was reversed shortly afterward, following protests by local residents and concerns that the lodging conditions would be inadequate.

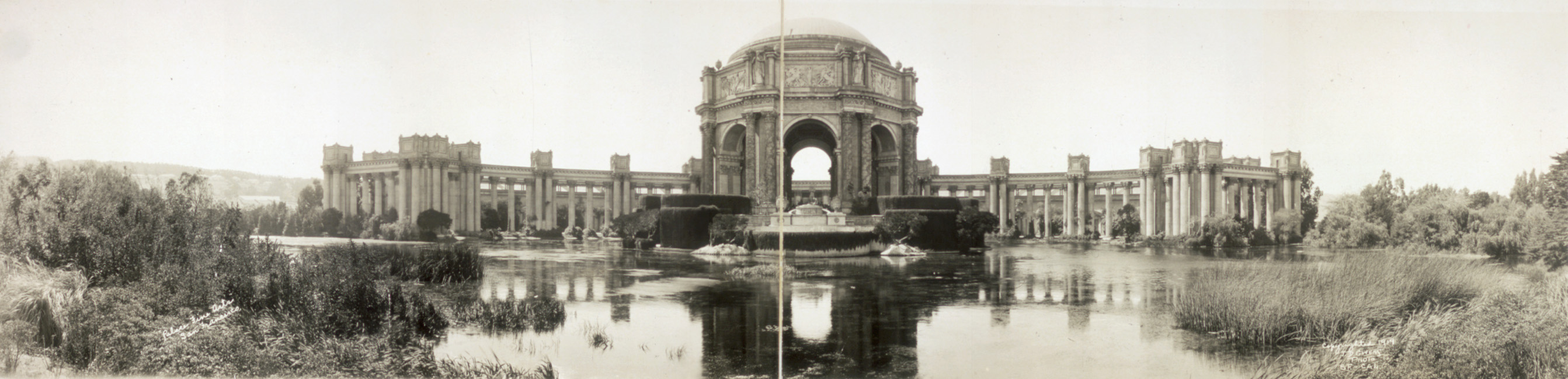
Panoramic view Palace of Fine Arts: 1919

== Design ==
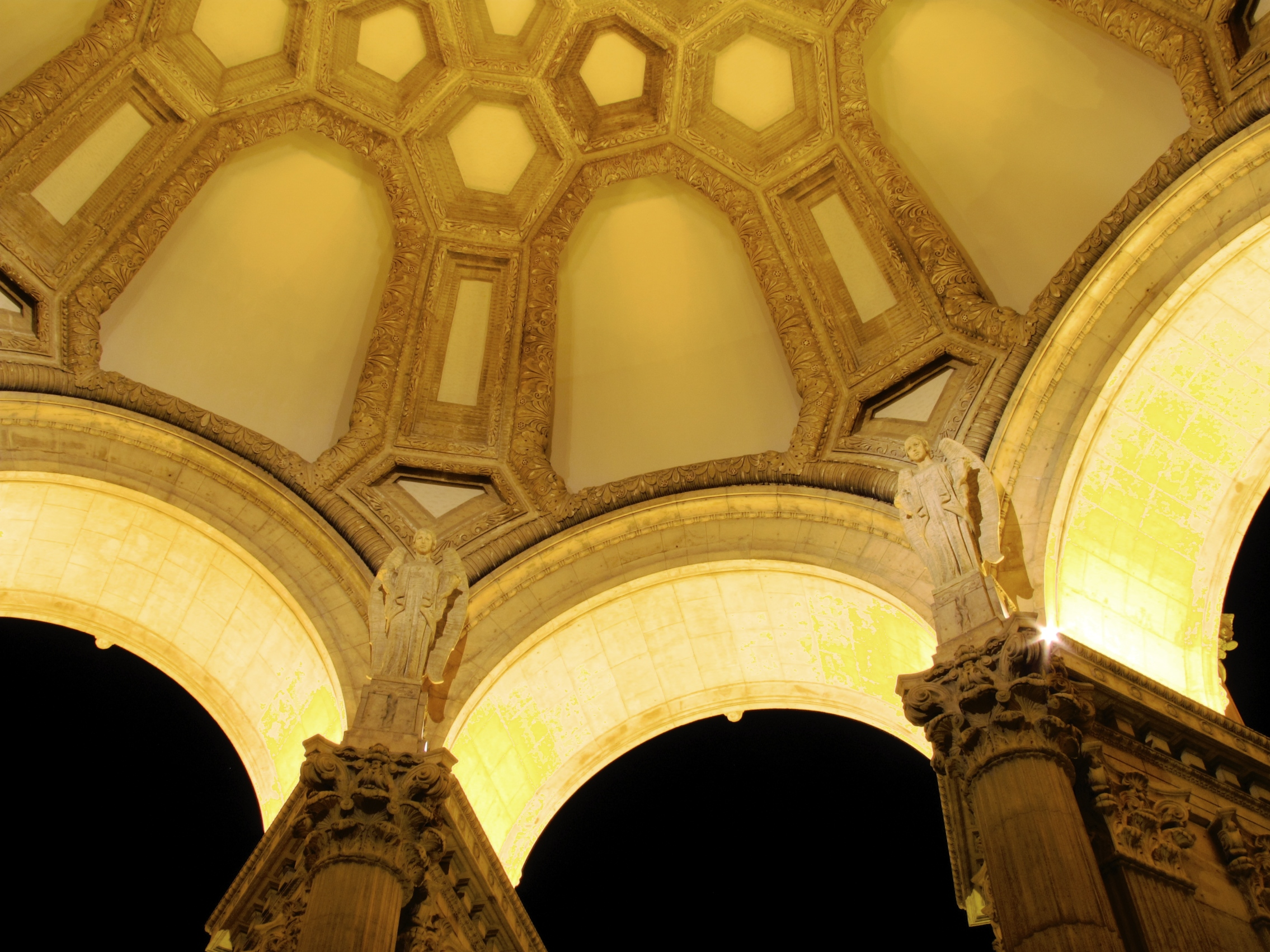
Underside of the rotunda

Built around a small artificial lagoon, the Palace of Fine Arts is composed of a wide, 1,100 ft (340 m) pergola around a central rotunda situated by the water. The lagoon was intended to echo those found in classical settings in Europe, where the expanse of water provides a mirror surface to reflect the grand buildings and an undisturbed vista to appreciate them from a distance.

Ornamentation includes Bruno Zimm's three repeating panels around the entablature of the rotunda, representing "The Struggle for the Beautiful", symbolizing Greek culture. While Ulric Ellerhusen supplied the weeping women atop the colonnade and the sculptured frieze and allegorical figures representing Contemplation, Wonderment, and Meditation.

The underside of the Palace rotunda's dome features eight large insets, which originally contained murals by Robert Reid. Four depicted the conception and birth of Art, "its commitment to the Earth, its progress and acceptance by the human intellect," and the four "golds" of California (poppies, citrus fruits, metallic gold, and wheat).

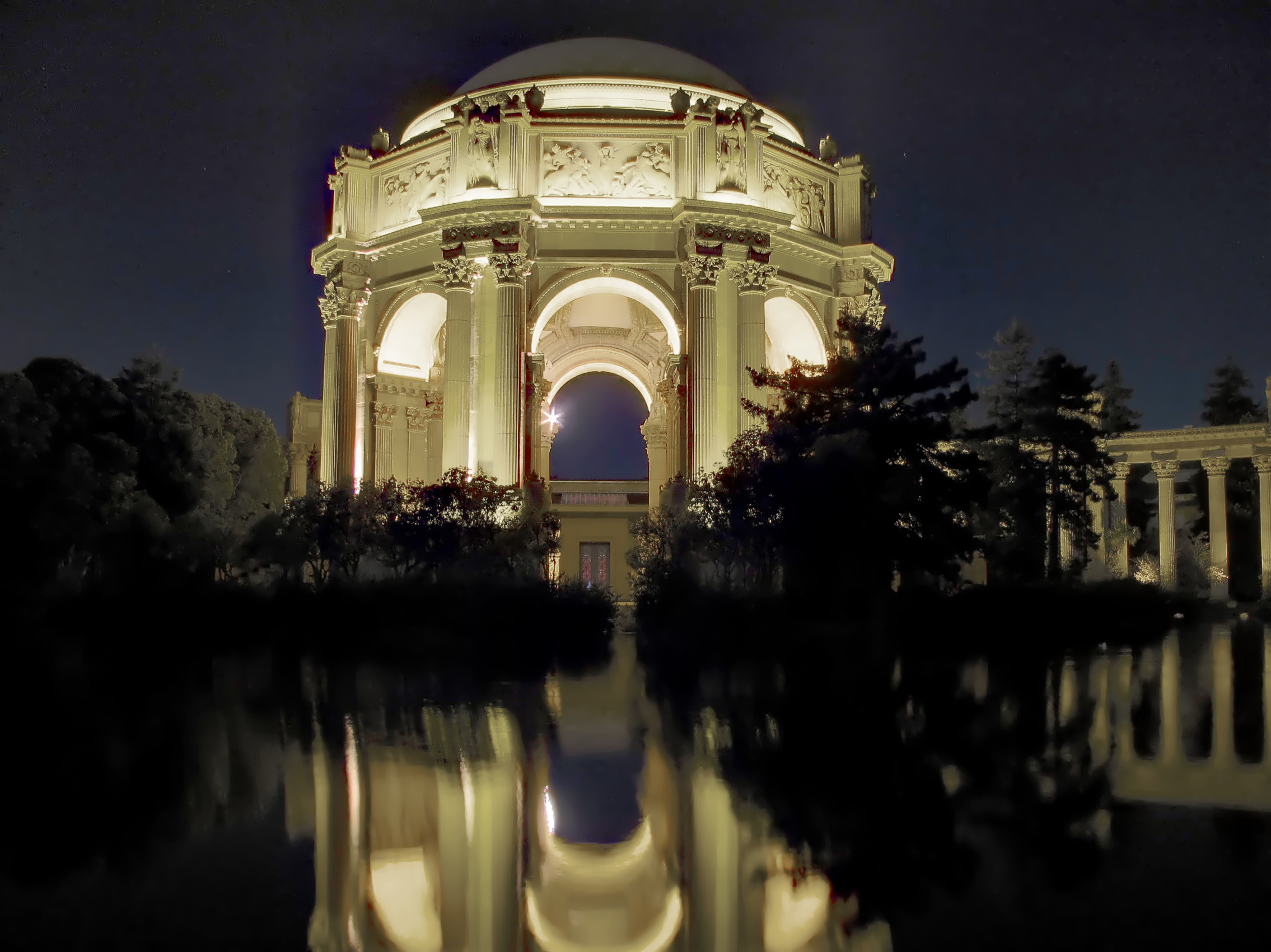
The Palace at night, reflected in the water

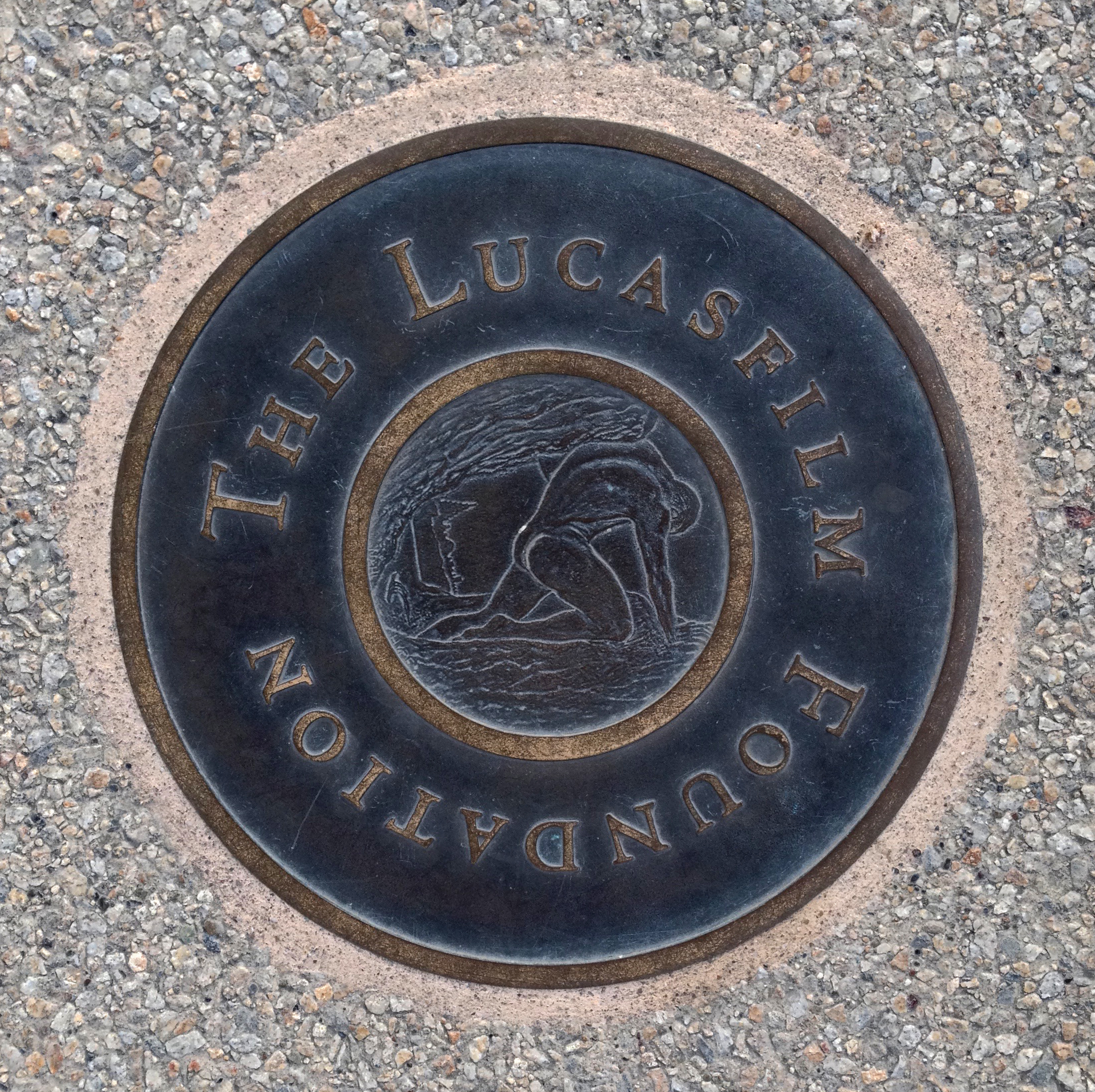
Emblem plaque for the Lucasfilm Foundation (on the floor underneath the dome)

== In popular culture ==
The Palace of Fine Arts has been seen in films such as Vertigo (1958), Time After Time (1979), Bicentennial Man (1999), The Room (2003), and Twisted (2004). It also served as the backdrop for set pieces in So I Married An Axe Murderer (1993) and The Rock (1996). Additionally, the Palace has appeared in the Indian films My Name is Khan (2010) and Vaaranam Aayiram (2008). It also appears in Season 7, Episode 2 of Mission: Impossible, and in Season 8, Episode 7 of Mannix. It was incorporated into the imagery of the Sept of Baelor in Season 1, Episode 9 of Game of Thrones.

Lucasfilm headquarters was constructed near the Palace of Fine Arts, which has been noted for its similarity to the city of Theed on Naboo as it appears in the film Star Wars: Episode I – The Phantom Menace (1999).

In the 2000s, a smaller replica of the rotunda of the Palace of Fine Arts was built in Disney's California Adventure in Anaheim, serving as the entrance to a theater showing the film Golden Dreams about the history of California. The attraction closed on September 7, 2008, and was demolished in 2009 to make way for The Little Mermaid: Ariel's Undersea Adventure dark ride. The rotunda entrance remained, but it was repainted and serves as an entrance to the ride.

== Gallery ==
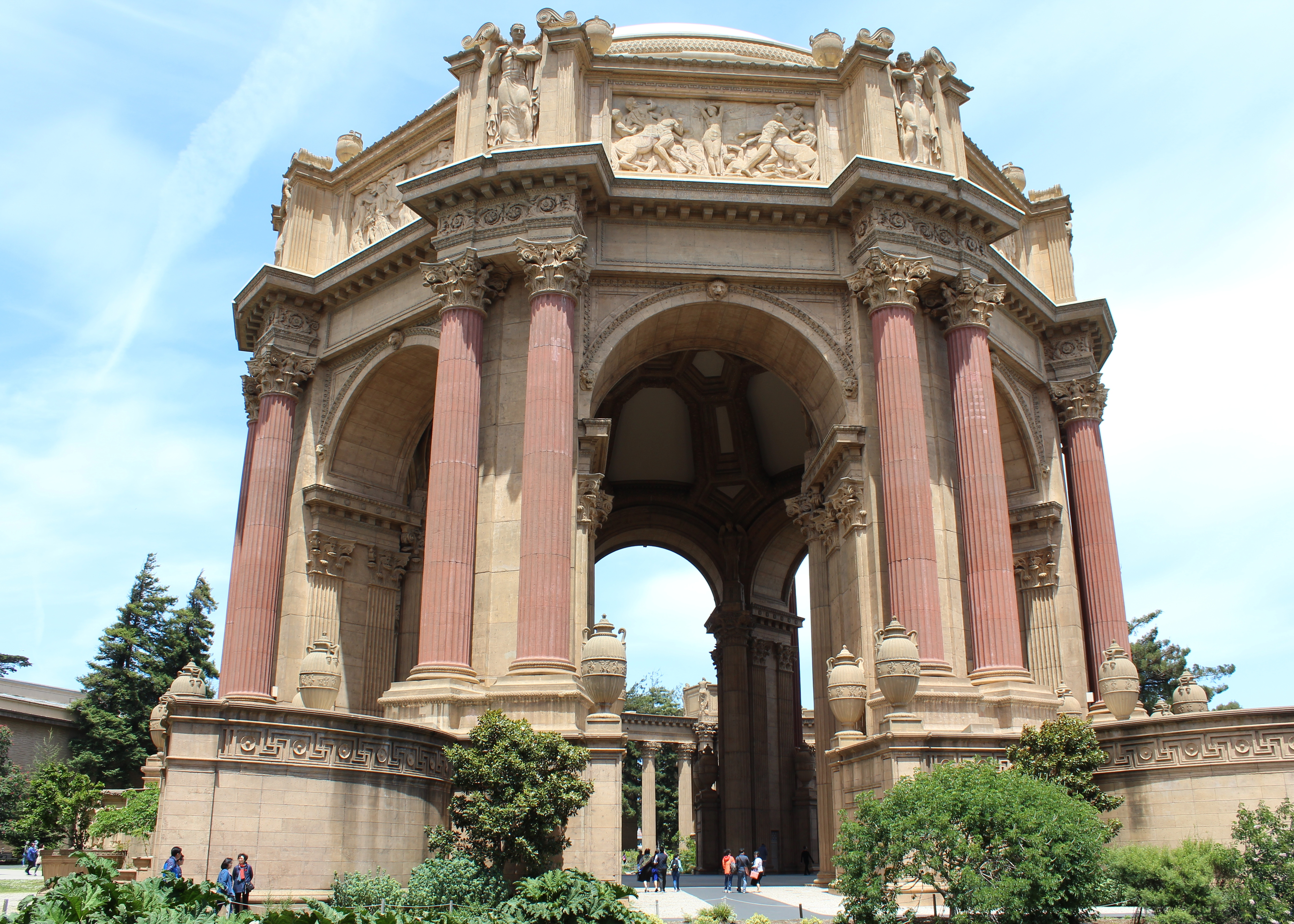
View of the rotunda from the northeast

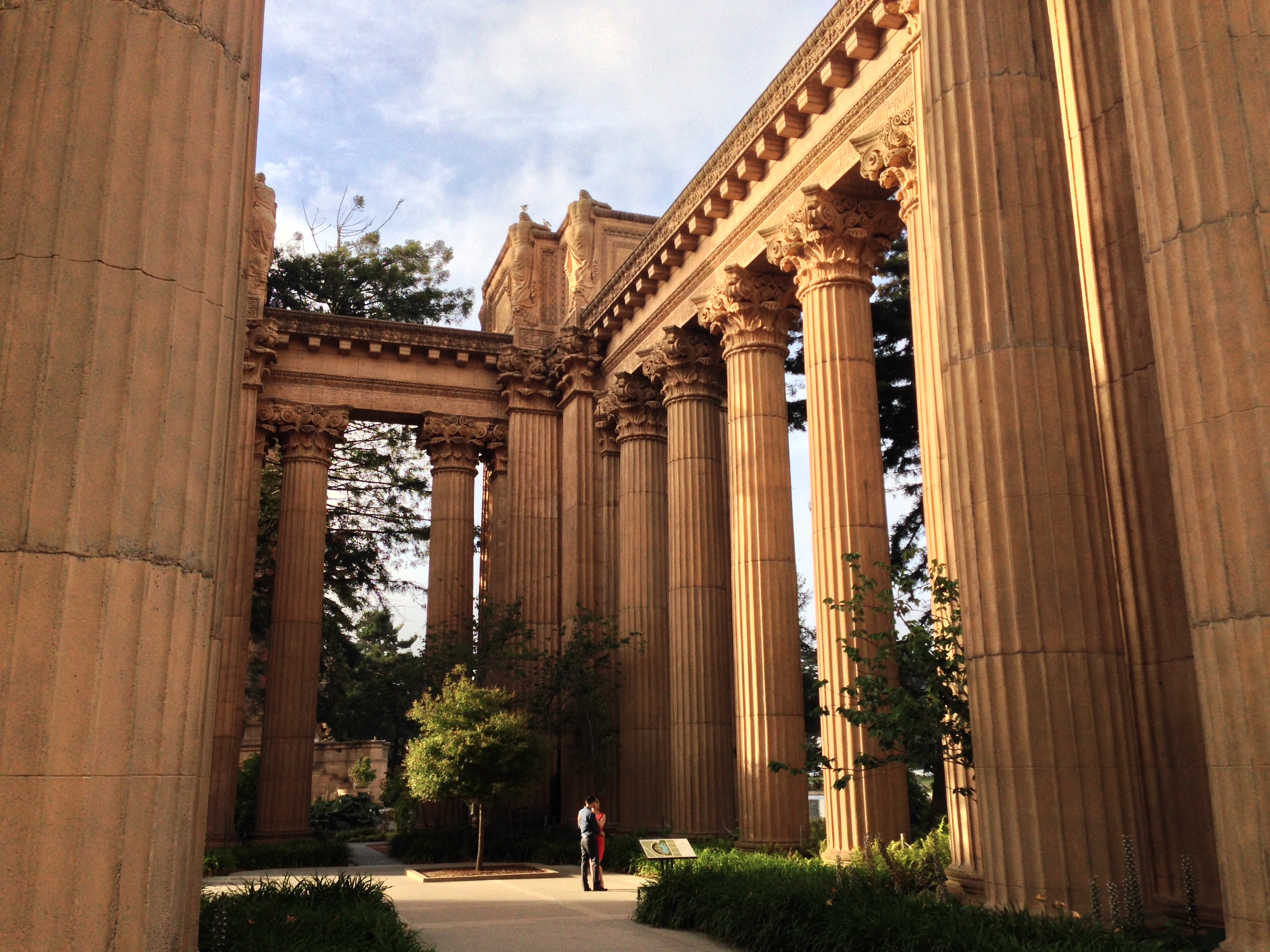
Colonnade of the palace

== See also ==
- 49-Mile Scenic Drive
- List of San Francisco Designated Landmarks
