= The Band Concert =

1935 Mickey Mouse color cartoon film

- Theatrical release poster featuring Gideon Goat.
- Directed by: Wilfred Jackson
- Produced by: Walt Disney
- Starring: Clarence Nash; Pinto Colvig
- Music by: Leigh Harline (music); Gioachino Rossini (score)
- Animation by: Johnny Cannon; Les Clark (Mickey Mouse); Ugo D'Orsi; Frenchy DeTremaudan; Clyde Geronimi; Huszti Horvath; Dick Huemer; Jack Kinney; Wolfgang Reitherman; Ward Kimball; Milt Kahl; Archie Robin; Louie Schmitt; Dick Williams; Roy Williams; Cy Young
- Layouts by: Hugh Hennesy; Terrell Stapp
- Color process: Technicolor (3-strip)
- Production company: Walt Disney Productions
- Distributed by: United Artists
- Release date: February 23, 1935
- Running time: 9:20
- Country: United States
- Language: English

The Band Concert is a 1935 American animated short film produced in 3-strip Technicolor by Walt Disney Productions and released by United Artists. The 73rd short film in the Mickey Mouse series, it was the second release of the year, and notable as the first in the series to be produced in color.

Directed by Wilfred Jackson, with music adapted by Leigh Harline, the action follows a small music band, conducted by Mickey Mouse, which struggles through a distraction-filled public performance. Clarence Nash provides the voice of Donald Duck, the only speaking character. The film remains among the most highly acclaimed of the Disney shorts.

== Plot ==
Mickey Mouse's concert band is performing a concert in a park. As the film opens, they are being applauded for having just played music from Louis Joseph Ferdinand Hérold's Zampa. They next begin Gioacchino Rossini's William Tell overture.

Mickey's performance is first disrupted by Peter Pig's vibrato trumpet and Paddy Pig's tuba playing Prelude: Dawn from the William Tell overture. Meanwhile, Donald Duck rolls a vendor cart through the audience selling popcorn, lemonade, peanuts, and ice cream, which further causes a distraction to Mickey.

While the band is playing the "Finale" segment, Donald plays "Turkey in the Straw" with a flute at the same tempo as the band. Overhearing Donald, the entire band absent-mindedly find themselves playing Donald's song. Realizing his mistake, Mickey gets mad over his performance being disrupted in this manner and splits Donald's flute in half, only for Donald to get another one out. They play the song once more and Donald is stopped by Mickey, who splits the flute again. The band resumes the segment and Donald pulls out a third flute and plays "Turkey in the Straw" again, but before Mickey can stop him again, Donald breaks the flute himself. An angry trombonist grabs Donald by the neck, shakes out several of his flutes and forces him off the stage, knocking him backwards into the vendor cart.

While Donald tries to play the song again, a bee harasses him. When the bee lands on Mickey's hat, Donald throws ice cream at the bee, but it flies into Peter Pig's trumpet; he shoots it out, accidentally hitting Mickey with it. The ice cream slides under Mickey's uniform, making him shake around, causing the band to briefly play The Streets of Cairo until it falls out and he kicks it away. Mickey has the band play Ranz des Vaches and swats his baton at the bee, temporarily causing the band to briefly play notes more drastically different than the song. Percussionist Horace Horsecollar tries to kill the bee by squishing it with his cymbals and with a hammer, but accidentally hits Goofy's head instead, driving his head down into his jacket. He continues playing his clarinet from inside it while Horace leaves in shame.

When the band comes to the "Storm" segment of the overture, it summons an actual tornado, prompting the audience and Donald to run away. The benches that the audience members were sitting on come to life (each wearing a hat that fell off an audience member) and also begin running for their lives as well. Donald tries to take shelter in some trees only for the tornado to tie them in knots with Donald in the middle. The tornado sucks up and destroys everything in its path, even the pavilion on which the band is playing, but the band is so used to distractions at this point that they continue to play from inside the tornado, in which Mickey floats through the remains of a wrecked house, Peter Pig gets spanked by a fence, and Clarabelle gets hit by a coat and an umbrella that turns her flute inside out. The tornado suddenly freezes when Mickey takes a pause conducting and goes in reverse as the band finishes the last part of the song. As the storm passes, the band is thrown into a tree and they finish the overture. By this time, the only remaining audience member is Donald Duck who applauds enthusiastically. Witnessing Donald playing "Turkey in the Straw" as an encore, the angry band members throw their instruments at him, which ends with a tuba being thrown on top of him. Donald's hands appear out of the tuba's blowpiece and plays a final flutter of notes.

== The Band ==
- Mickey Mouse - Conductor
- Goofy - Clarinet
- Unnamed Dog - Trombone
- Clarabelle Cow - Flute
- Horace Horsecollar - Percussion
- Peter Pig - Trumpet
- Paddy Pig - Tuba

== Cast ==
- Clarence Nash as Donald Duck
- Pinto Colvig as miscellaneous noises

== Reception ==
The Band Concert has become one of the most highly acclaimed Disney short films. Esquire magazine cultural critic Gilbert Seldes wrote that "[none of] dozens of works produced in America at the same time in all the other arts can stand comparison with this one." The Italian conductor Arturo Toscanini was such a fan of The Band Concert that he saw it six times in the theater and later invited Walt Disney to his home in Italy.

In The Disney Films, Leonard Maltin said that The Band Concert is "one of the best cartoons ever made anywhere... There are nuances of expression in Mickey's character throughout this film that had seldom been explored in earlier shorts. The pacing is also entirely different from the standard Mickey Mouse comedies of the early thirties. Instead of trying to pack in a thousand gags a minute, The Band Concert takes its time and builds to a crescendo."

The Band Concert was rated third in the 1994 book The 50 Greatest Cartoons, as rated by members of the field of animation. As a result, it was the highest-ranked Disney cartoon on the list, and the only one in the top 5 not produced by Warner Bros. Cartoons.

== Home media ==
The short was released on December 4, 2001, on Walt Disney Treasures: Mickey Mouse in Living Color.

== Legacy ==
According to Leonard Maltin, the 1942 Mickey Mouse film Symphony Hour was somewhat of a remake of The Band Concert.

In the 1942 wartime cartoon, All Together, Mickey and his whole band from the cartoon is seen in the parade.

In the video game Kingdom Hearts II, in the Garden area of Disney Castle, there is a topiary sculpture of all characters in the band besides Mickey, Donald, and Goofy.

The Band Concert serves as the basis for a projector level in the game Epic Mickey 2: The Power of Two.

The Band Concert was also the basis for, and title of the secret level in the game, Mickey Mania: The Timeless Adventures of Mickey Mouse (in the Sega Genesis/Mega Drive, Sega CD and PlayStation versions only).

The Band Concert is one of the parade units that was featured in the Tokyo Disneyland parade Disney on Parade: 100 Years of Magic, which depicts a large inflatable rendition of Mickey from the cartoon. It was later reused for Hong Kong Disneyland's Disney on Parade.

This cartoon was also the inspiration for the Walt Disney World Resort Magic Kingdom show Mickey's PhilharMagic.

The short was one of the many featured in Donald Duck's 50th Birthday. Donald remembers it in a psychiatric session with Dr. Ludwig Von Drake and says that Mickey "invited" Donald to play with his band.

The Band Concert is the theme for the Silly Symphony Swings attraction at Disney California Adventure Park.

This cartoon was featured in Disney's Magical Mirror Starring Mickey Mouse.

Mickey's music stand and a drum are on display as props from the short in the queue of the Mickey & Minnie's Runaway Railway attraction at Disneyland.

== See also ==
- Mickey Mouse (film series)
