= Silly Symphony Swings =

Disney California Adventure attraction

Coordinates: 33°48′20.34″N 117°55′21.55″W

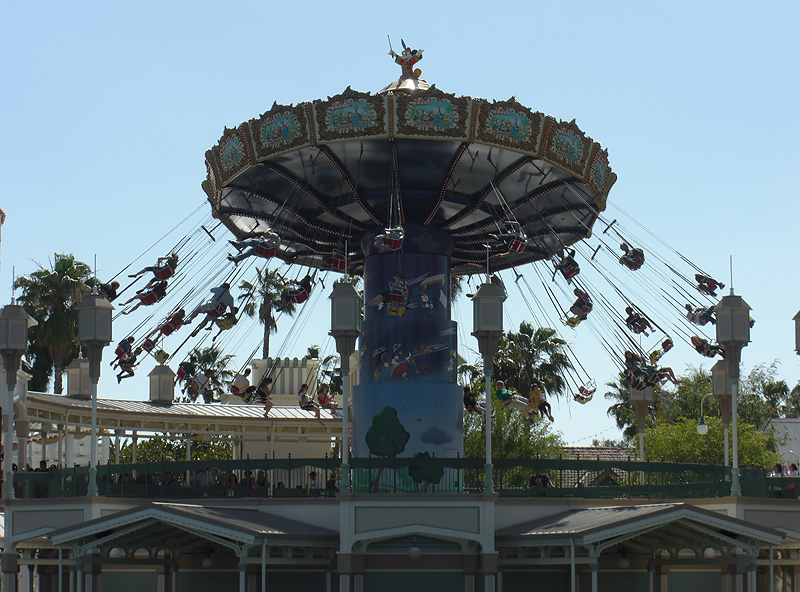
- View of the attraction as seen from Paradise Park

Disney California Adventure
- Area: Paradise Pier (2010–2018); Paradise Gardens Park (2018–present)
- Status: Operating
- Soft opening date: May 28, 2010
- Opening date: June 11, 2010

Ride statistics
- Attraction type: Wave Swinger
- Manufacturer: Zierer
- Designer: Walt Disney Imagineering
- Music: William Tell Overture
- Height: 40 ft (12 m)
- Vehicle type: Chairs
- Vehicles: 48
- Riders per vehicle: 1
- Duration: 1:30
- Height restriction: 40 in (102 cm)
- Previously known as: Orange Stinger (2001–2009)
- Single rider line available
- Must transfer from wheelchair

Silly Symphony Swings is a wave swinger attraction in Paradise Gardens Park at the Disneyland Resort in California. Themed to Disney's 1935 short film The Band Concert, Mickey Mouse conducts from high atop the attraction, synchronized with the music. Although The Band Concert was not part of the Silly Symphony film series, the name was applied to the attraction as a result of its symphony storyline. Closely following the plot of The Band Concert the main column of the ride rises, revealing a tornado which spins the riders to the tune of the William Tell Overture and William Tell's "Storm". Once the tornado safely passes, the music comes to an end and the ride slows and lowers riders to the ground. The Silly Symphony Swings update was part of the multi-year, $1.1 billion (US) expansion plan for Disney's California Adventure Park. Previews of the attraction were offered at California Adventure's Walt Disney Imagineering Blue Sky Cellar.

The attraction soft-opened on May 28, 2010, an official grand opening on June 11, 2010.

== Previous attraction history ==
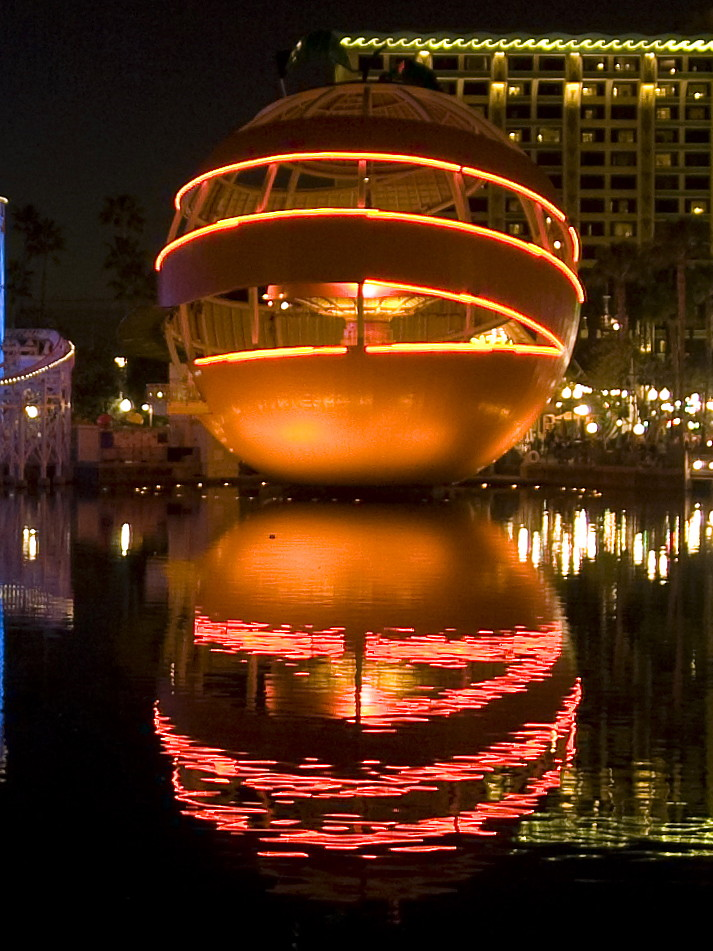

The Orange Stinger, the predecessor of Silly Symphony Swings, is a Zierer Wave Swinger enclosed in a large orange themed as bees. The ride opened to the public on February 8, 2001, and operated until August 14, 2009. Riders swung on suspended seats inside the enclosure which offered views of nearby Paradise Pier and Paradise Bay through large openings in the walls. These openings were made to look like peeled sections of an orange peel. The original bumblebee seats were removed on February 10, 2001, due to damage during use. After removal, the seats were unthemed swing seats. Initially an orange scent effect was introduced into the attraction giving it the smell of a "real" orange, but was later removed because it attracted real bees.

The giant orange was a tribute to the orange fields that Disneyland was built on, as well as Orange County, where the Disneyland Resort is located.
