= Golden Dreams =

2001 film by Agnieszka Holland

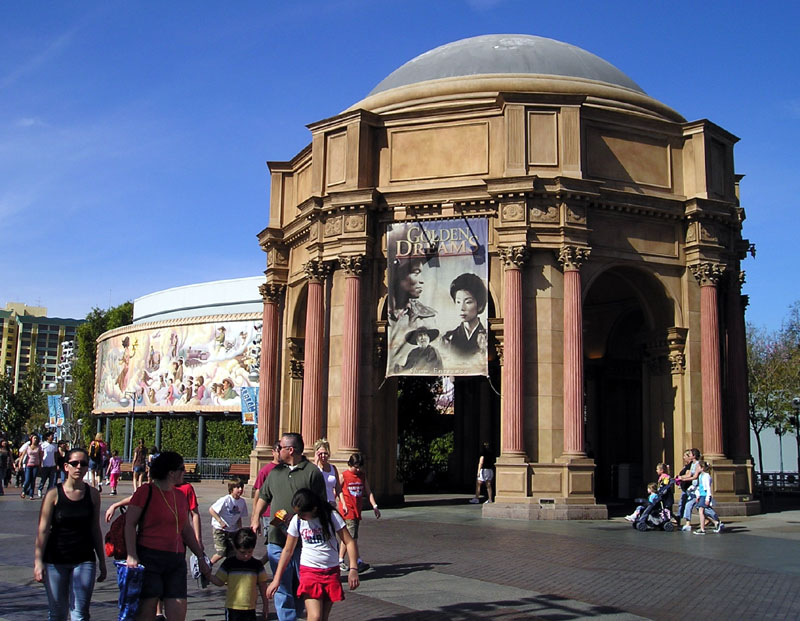

Disney California Adventure
- Area: Golden State (The Bay Area)
- Status: Removed
- Opening date: February 8, 2001
- Closing date: September 7, 2008
- Replaced by: The Little Mermaid: Ariel's Undersea Adventure

Ride statistics
- Attraction type: Film presentation
- Music: Bruce Broughton
- Duration: 25:00
- Hosted by: Calafia (Whoopi Goldberg)
- Seating: 347 theatre seats
- Single rider line available
- Wheelchair accessible
- Assistive listening available
- Closed captioning available

Golden Dreams
- Directed by: Agnieszka Holland
- Written by: Tom Fitzgerald (Disney Imagineering executive)
- Starring: Whoopi Goldberg; Yasuko Takahara; Richard Balin; Eric Matheny; Mark Neveldine
- Narrated by: Whoopi Goldberg
- Cinematography: Jack N. Green
- Edited by: Erica Mireles Folsey and Benjamin Rawls (assistant editors)
- Music by: Bruce Broughton; Walter Afanasieff (song)
- Production companies: Golden Dreams Productions; Walt Disney Pictures
- Distributed by: Disneyland Resort
- Release dates: February 8, 2001 (Anaheim, California)
- Running time: 22 minutes
- Country: United States
- Language: English

Golden Dreams is a film about the history of California. It was a featured attraction at Disney California Adventure at the Disneyland Resort in Anaheim, California, opening with the park on February 8, 2001. It starred Whoopi Goldberg as Calafia, the Queen of California. On September 7, 2008, the last showing of the film to the public was made. The theater was razed in July 2009 and was replaced by The Little Mermaid: Ariel's Undersea Adventure. However, the exterior replica of the Bernard Maybeck's Palace of Fine Arts remained. The final showing took place as a private showing for cast members on March 26, 2009.

== Synopsis ==
Guests entered the theater, a replica of the Bernard Maybeck façade of San Francisco's Palace of Fine Arts, a famed Bay Area landmark constructed for the 1915 Panama-Pacific Exposition.

As the show began, two tall art deco statues of a single goddess-like woman, one on either side of a film projection screen, were bathed in golden light. The statue on the right "comes to life," personified by Goldberg, through a video of her face, which was projected from the rear onto the translucent head of the figure. The statue introduced herself as "Calafia, the Queen of California." Calafia explained that she was the spirit within California, and an inspiration to many famous Californians. Goldberg appeared in some of the filmed sequences that followed as Calafia—in disguise—to comment or offer encouraging words to various characters who found themselves in challenging situations.

The 70-mm film then played which highlighted eras and incidents in the history of California, including illustrations of injustice. Scenes featuring Chumash Indians living on the shore, for example, were followed by the same Indians being held captive by Spanish missionaries and conquistadors.

After the establishment of California, events such as the troubles endured by Chinese laborers working on the railroad and miners during the Gold Rush of 1849 were presented. The immigration issue faced by Japanese women seeking to live in the United States, especially California, was also shown. Japanese and other Asians were denied entry, although wives of established immigrants were allowed to enter. Many women became "picture brides," agreeing to marriage on the basis of exchanged photographs in order to come to the United States. A powerful dramatization showed the crushed hopes of one young picture bride whose husband was far older than represented in the photo he provided. The film continued into the 20th century, with the stories of the famed and infamous water and civil engineer William Mulholland, the hardships of those seeking a new life during the Great Depression, film producers of the 1930s, and women taking over "men's jobs" to achieve victory in World War II. Still photos of the Japanese brides and of impoverished women in a migrant camp in the 1930s were the work of noted photographer, Dorothea Lange.

After the war, thousands of people moved to California to seek good living, sunny weather, and suburban life. The new luxuries of freeways, amusements (such as Disneyland), and easy life were shown. After the 1950s, the turbulent counterculture of the 1960s was depicted. Finally, the technology boom of the latter part of the 20th century was featured, with the story of Steve Wozniak and Steve Jobs and the creation of the personal computer.

The film ended with a montage of notable events and Californians. A concluding salute to discovery, fortitude and imagination was given by Calafia. Her eyes then closed as her face fell back into statuesque repose, the light within the statue faded, and the house lights came up, and then her face briefly reanimated to remind a woman that she forgot her bag as guests walked out of the theater.

== Production ==
The 22-minute film was directed by Polish director Agnieszka Holland. The song at the end, "Just One Dream", was written by Walter Afanasieff and performed by Heather Headley, an actress known for originating the parts of Nala in the Broadway version of The Lion King and of the title character in Aida. The montage during the song was reminiscent of a similar finale film to the attraction in The American Adventure Pavilion in Epcot's World Showcase, in which a cavalcade of fading images of noteworthy American historical events were set to an orchestral score.

As described by Jennette McCurdy in her 2022 memoir, I'm Glad My Mom Died, one of her first acting roles was for this film, where she appears as a young girl in a car during the scene about the Great Depression. McCurdy was not originally intended for the role, but was chosen because the original actor was not able to take direction.
