= Jumpin' Jellyfish =

Attraction at Disney theme parks

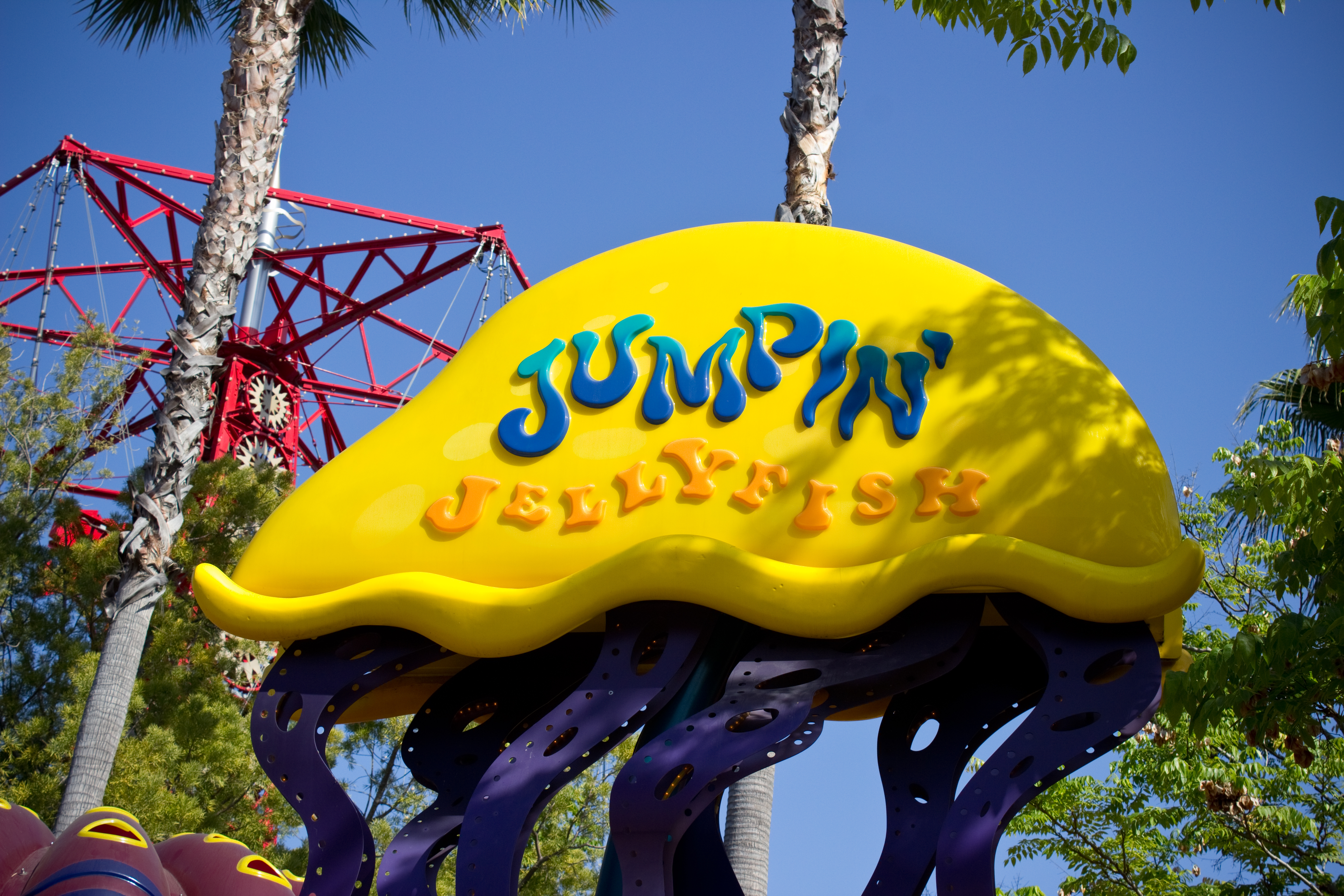

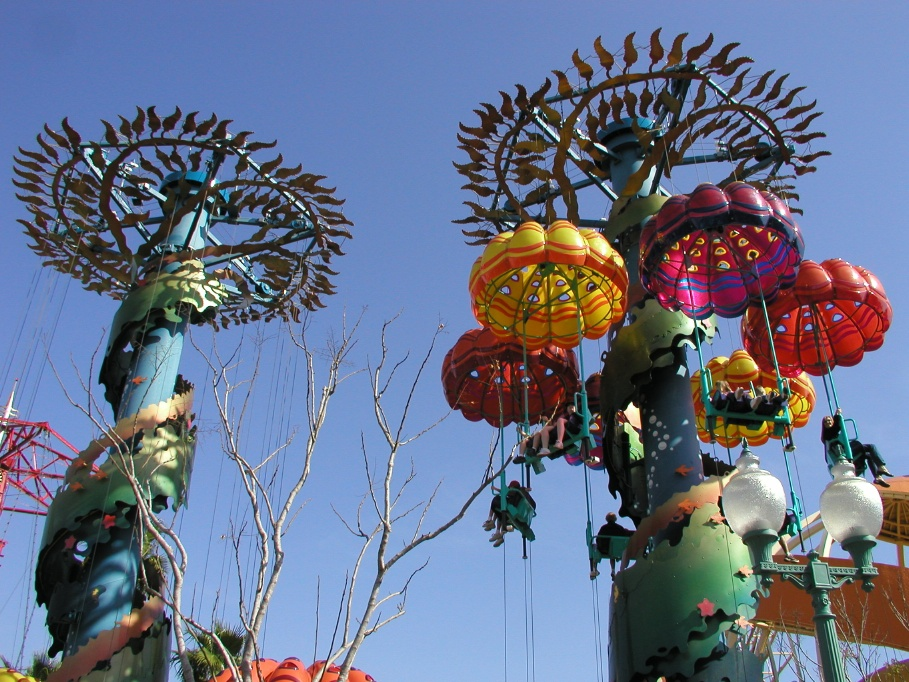
- Jumpin' Jellyfish at Disney California Adventure

Disney California Adventure
- Area: Paradise Pier (2001–2018); Paradise Gardens Park (2018–present)
- Status: Operating
- Opening date: February 8, 2001

Tokyo DisneySea
- Area: Mermaid Lagoon
- Status: Operating
- Opening date: September 4, 2001

Ride statistics
- Attraction type: Paratower
- Manufacturer: Intamin
- Height: 40 ft (12 m)
- Vehicle type: Jellyfish
- Riders per vehicle: 2
- Duration: 1:30
- Height restriction: 40 in (102 cm)
- Must transfer from wheelchair

Jumpin' Jellyfish is a Paratower, a parachute jump–style ride at Disney California Adventure at the Disneyland Resort in Anaheim, California in the US and Tokyo DisneySea at Tokyo Disney Resort in Japan.

The attraction's name comes from the jellyfish-themed parachute ride vehicles, the bubble and 50-foot (15 m), kelp-themed towers. Jumpin' Jellyfish has a sister-themed attraction that opened in September 2001 at Tokyo DisneySea. This attraction is similar to that of the former Maliboomer, but scaled down to more child-sized proportions and rethemed. The 180-foot-tall (55 m) Maliboomer required riders to be at least 52 inches (1,300 mm) tall, whereas Jumpin' Jellyfish only requires riders to be at least 40 inches (1,000 mm).

The attraction is similar to Toy Soldiers Parachute Drop, an attraction located at Walt Disney Studios Park in France and at Hong Kong Disneyland in Hong Kong.
