= Goofy's Sky School =

Steel wild mouse roller coaster

- Previously known as Mulholland Madness (2001–2010)
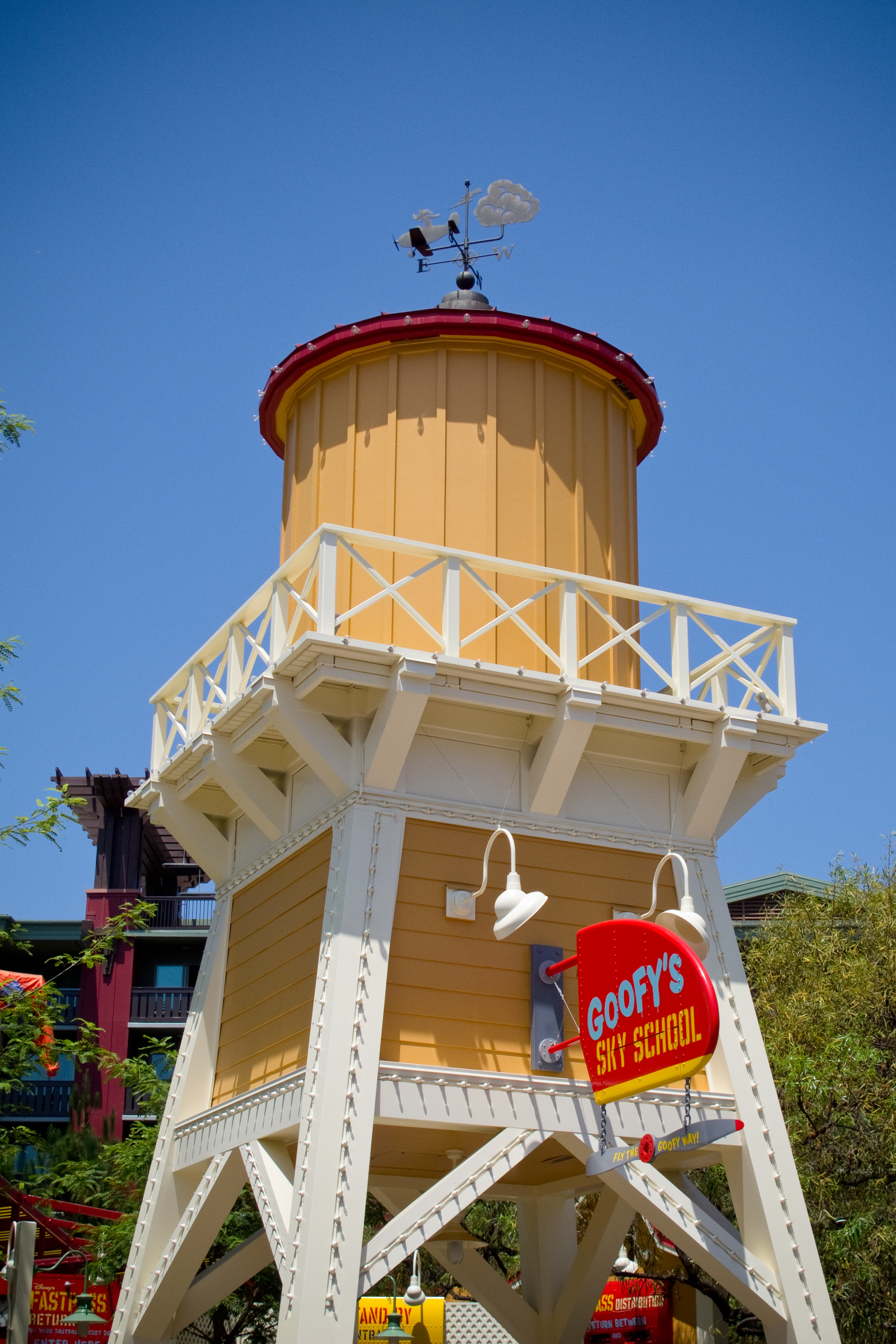

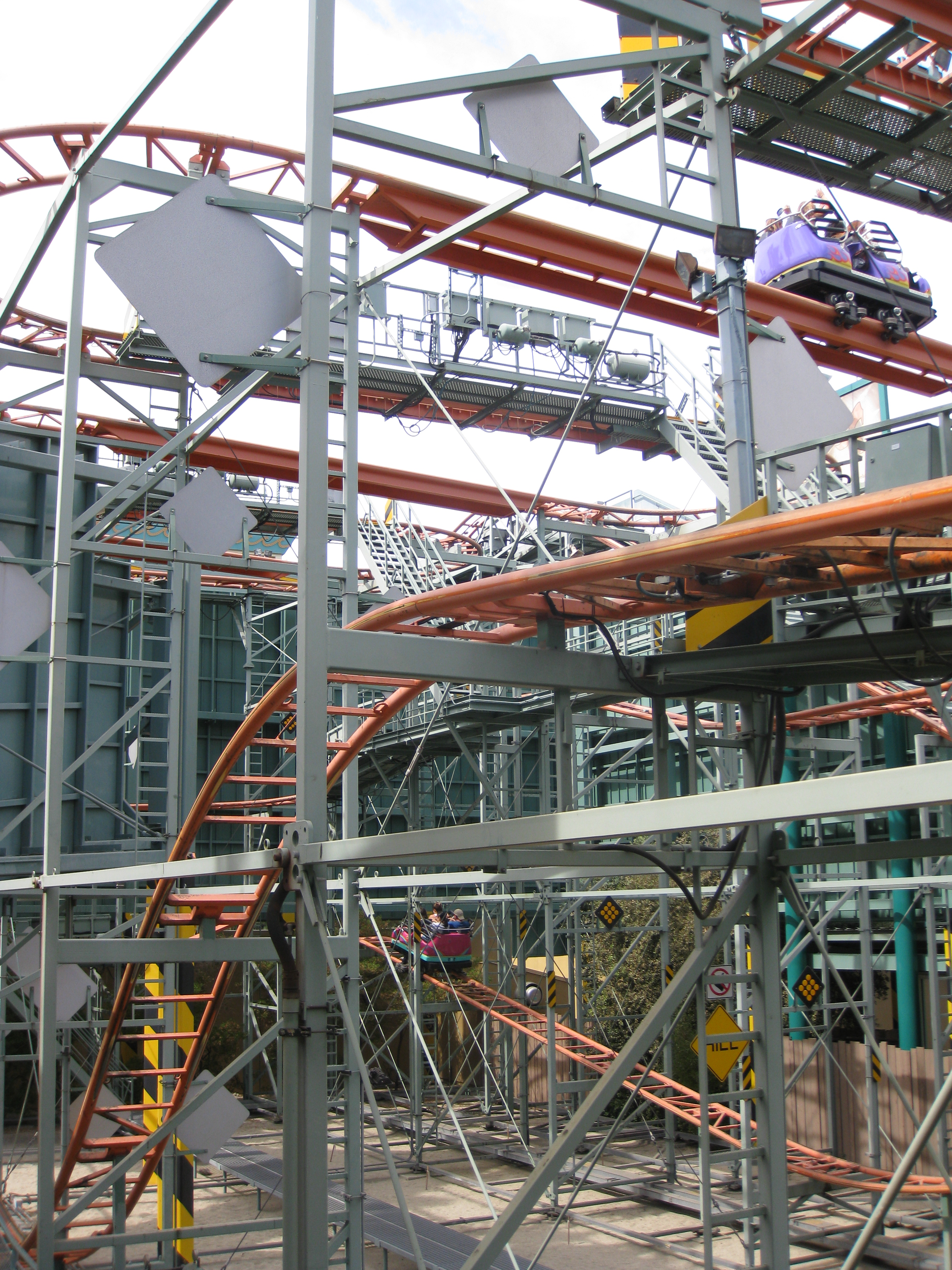
- Top: The entrance of Goofy's Sky School; Bottom: Goofy's Sky School drops (as Mulholland Madness).

Disney California Adventure
- Location: Disney California Adventure
- Park section: Paradise Pier (2001–2018); Paradise Gardens Park (2018–present)
- Coordinates: 33.80632°N 117.92304°W
- Status: Operating
- Opening date: February 8, 2001 (as Mullholland Madness); July 1, 2011 (as Goofy's Sky School)
- Closing date: October 12, 2010 (as Mulholland Madness)

General statistics
- Type: Steel – Wild Mouse
- Manufacturer: Mack Rides
- Designer: Walt Disney Imagineering
- Lift/launch system: Chain lift hill
- Height: 55 ft (17 m)
- Length: 1,200 ft (370 m)
- Speed: 27 mph (43 km/h)
- Inversions: 0
- Duration: 1:45
- Height restriction: 42 in (107 cm)
- Trains: Unknown number of trains with a single car; riders arranged 2 across in 2 rows for a total of 4 riders per train
- Host: Goofy (voice of Bill Farmer, safety spiels)
- Lightning Lane Available
- Single rider line available
- Must transfer from wheelchair
- Goofy's Sky School at RCDB

Goofy's Sky School is a steel wild mouse roller coaster at the Paradise Gardens Park section of Disney California Adventure in Anaheim, California. The ride is based on Disney's 1940 short film Goofy's Glider. The rethemed attraction opened on July 1, 2011.

== History ==
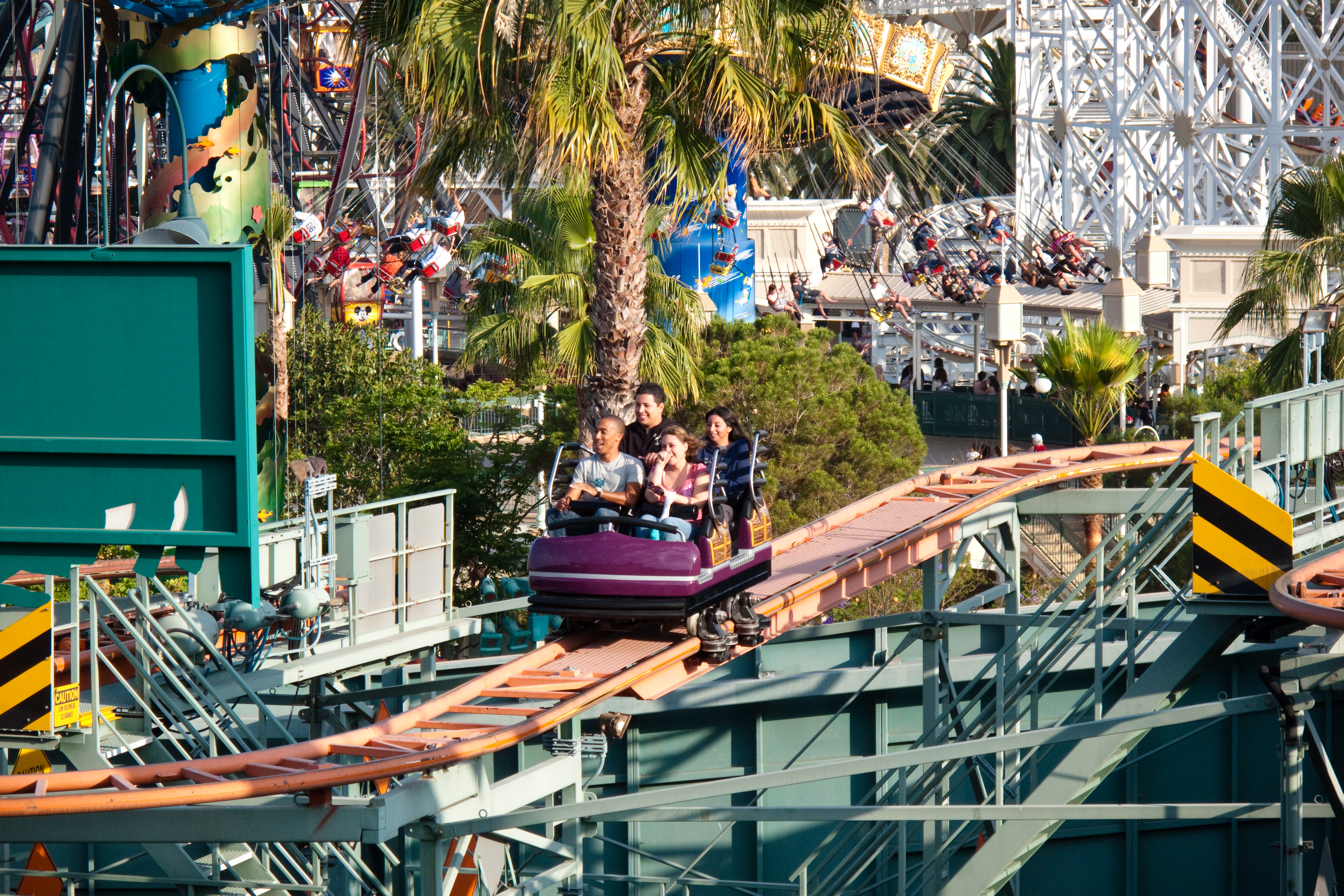
One of the Mullholland Madness cars navigating the track.

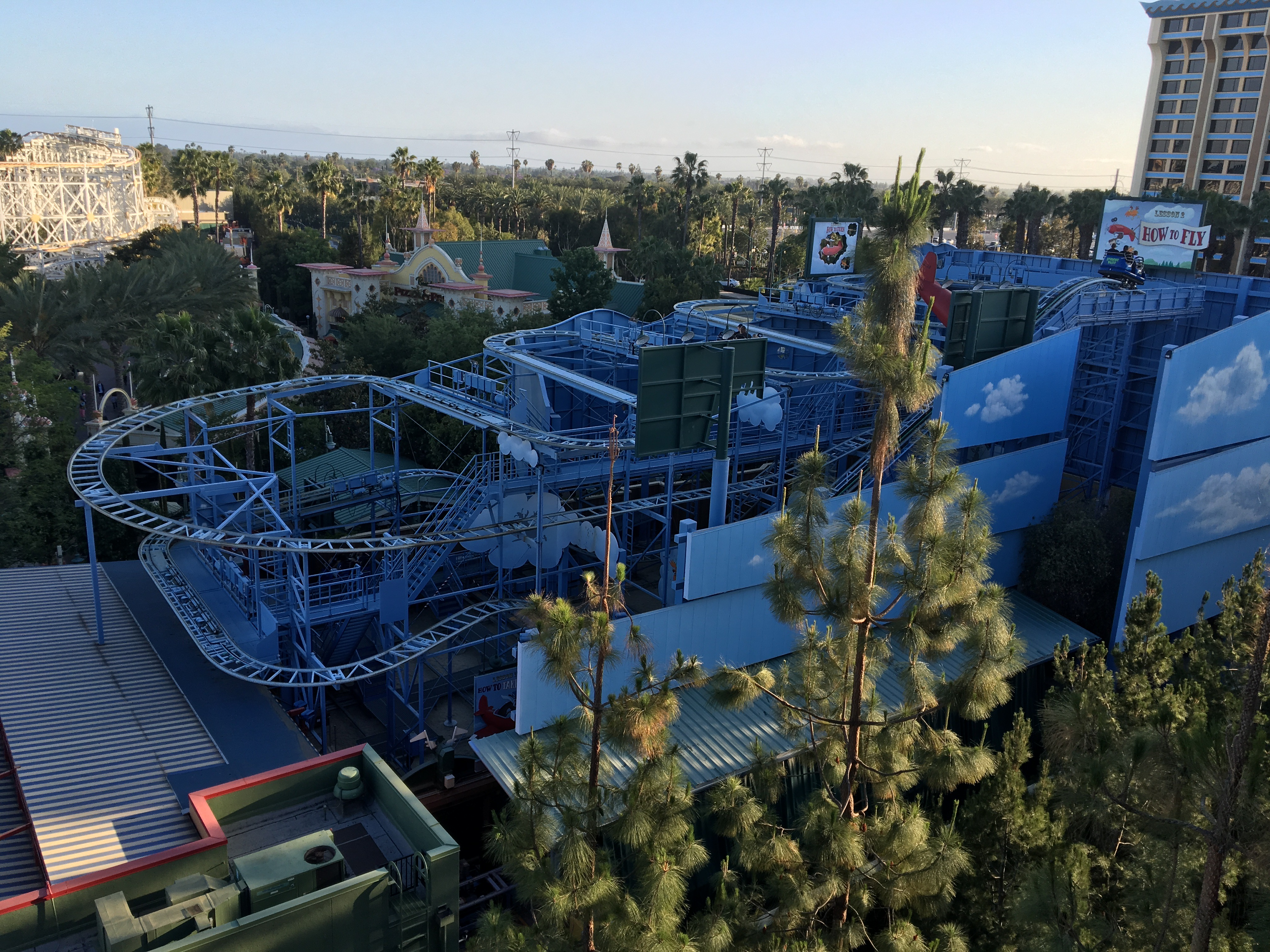
Overview of Goofy's Sky School

Goofy's Sky School originally opened on February 8, 2001, as Mulholland Madness. The attraction's original name came from Mulholland Drive in Los Angeles, California, named after the famed engineer William Mulholland. Within the first month of its operation, three accidents occurred on the ride causing it to be shut for a short period of time for repairs. The ride vehicles were themed to the many cars one can find on the Southern California freeway systems, (such as Highway Patrol cars or Classic Surfer "Woodies"). At the end of the ride, a sign on the wall above read "Rental Car Return".

In November 2004, Alamo Rent a Car became the new sponsor of Mulholland Madness.

On October 12, 2010, Mulholland Madness closed for refurbishment and re-theming as part of Disney California Adventure Park's major refurbishment. On July 1, 2011, the attraction reopened as Goofy's Sky School. The attraction's re-opening was part of a series of moves in an effort to introduce Disney characters into Paradise Pier.

== Ride ==
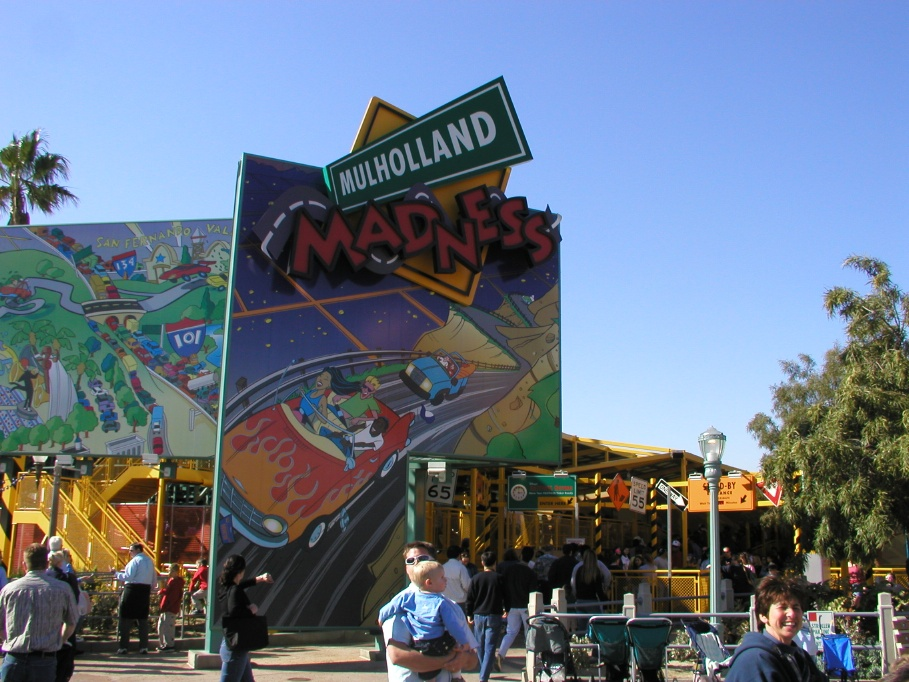
Goofy's Sky School's entrance when it was Mulholland Madness.

Goofy's Sky School is a wild mouse roller coaster manufactured by Mack Rides. Riders board a plane and navigate a crash course of flying which features sharp turns, steep drops and sudden stops. Goofy is pictured on billboards throughout the ride teaching guests the step-by-step process of flying a plane:

- Lesson 1: How to Take Off
- Lesson 2: How to Fly
- Lesson 3: How to Turn
- Lesson 4: How to Nosedive
- Lesson 5: How to Land
