= The Little Mermaid: Ariel's Undersea Adventure =

Dark ride musical attraction

The Little Mermaid ~ Ariel's Undersea Adventure
- Attraction logo at the Magic Kingdom.

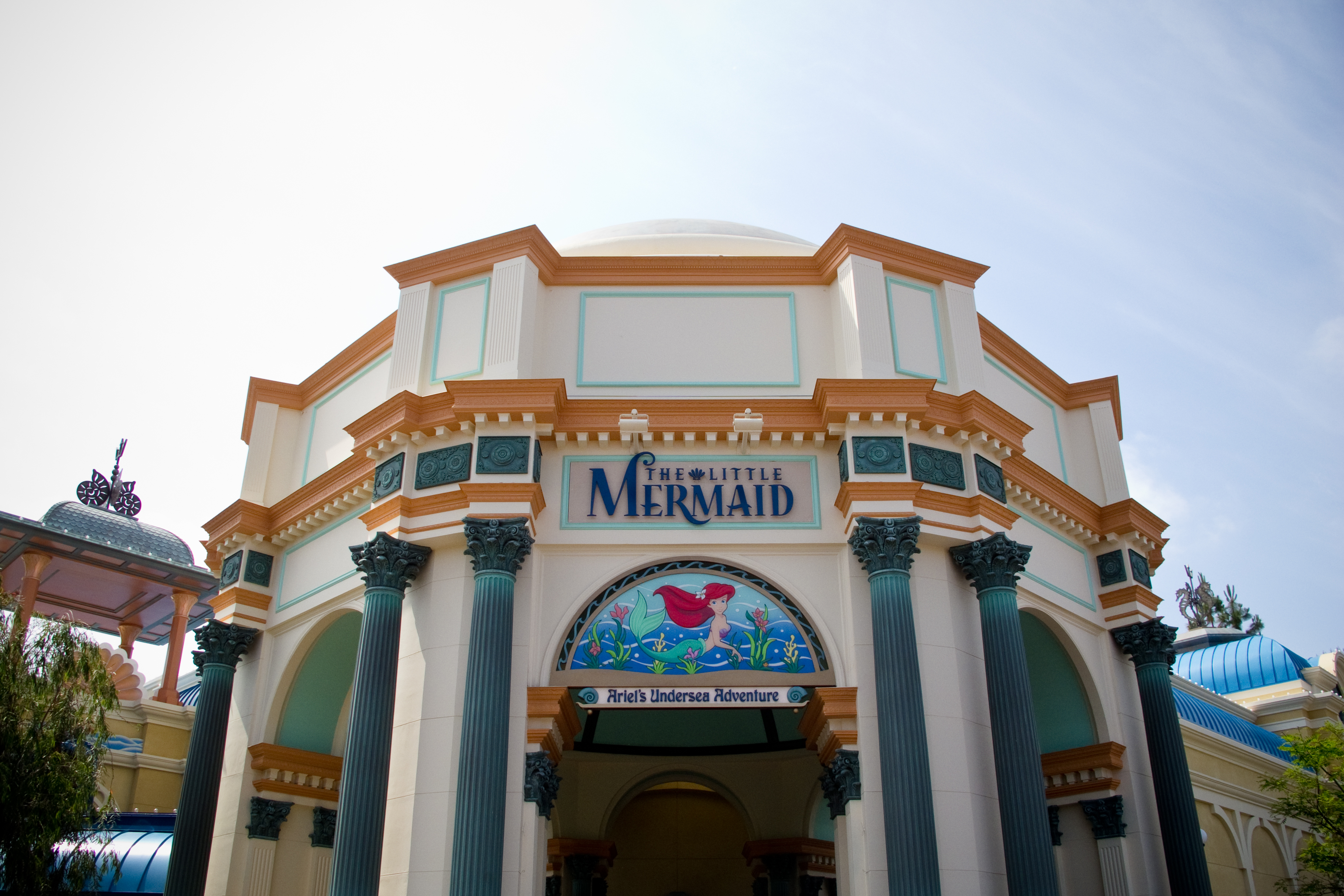
- The entrance for The Little Mermaid ~ Ariel's Undersea Adventure at Disney California Adventure.

Disney California Adventure
- Area: Paradise Pier (2011–2018); Paradise Gardens Park (2018–present)
- Coordinates: 33.8058064°N 117.9220354°W
- Status: Operating
- Soft opening date: May 26, 2011
- Opening date: June 3, 2011
- Replaced: Golden Dreams

Magic Kingdom
- Name: Under the Sea ~ Journey of the Little Mermaid
- Area: Fantasyland (Enchanted Forest)
- Coordinates: 28.4194705°N 81.5792776°W
- Status: Operating
- Soft opening date: October 12, 2012
- Opening date: December 6, 2012
- Replaced: 20,000 Leagues Under the Sea: Submarine Voyage (1971–1994)

Ride statistics
- Attraction type: Dark ride
- Manufacturer: Sansei Yusoki
- Designer: Walt Disney Imagineering
- Theme: The Little Mermaid
- Music: Alan Menken (music), Howard Ashman (lyrics), Alan Menken (score) & Danny Troob (transitional and queue arrangements)
- Length: 624 ft (190 m)
- Capacity: 1,900 riders per hour
- Vehicle type: Omnimover
- Vehicles: Clamshell
- Riders per vehicle: 2 to 4, plus lap-sitting
- Rows: 1
- Duration: 6:30
- Audio-Animatronics: Yes
- Lightning Lane Available
- Wheelchair accessible
- Assistive listening available

The Little Mermaid: Ariel's Undersea Adventure (stylized The Little Mermaid ~ Ariel's Undersea Adventure) is a ride attraction based on Disney Animation's 1989 film The Little Mermaid, located in Paradise Gardens Park at Disney California Adventure and in Fantasyland at Walt Disney World's Magic Kingdom Park, where it is titled Under the Sea: Journey of the Little Mermaid (stylized Under the Sea ~ Journey of the Little Mermaid). The ride opened on June 3, 2011 at Disney California Adventure, and on December 6, 2012 at Magic Kingdom.

== History ==
In the early-to-mid-1990s, Walt Disney Imagineering attempted to develop a Little Mermaid dark ride for Disneyland Paris and Magic Kingdom. Early plans for Tokyo DisneySea and Hong Kong Disneyland also included this ride. None of these versions were actually built, although a computer-generated ride-through animatic was included on the Platinum Edition DVD of The Little Mermaid in 2006.

Disney later went on to design and build a different version of the attraction for Disney California Adventure, as part of an effort to revitalize that park in the 2000s. The Little Mermaid: Ariel's Undersea Adventure opened on June 3, 2011 in an area of Paradise Pier formerly occupied by Golden Dreams.

In September 2009, Disney announced that Mickey's Toontown Fair at the Magic Kingdom would be demolished to make room for an expansion of Fantasyland. One of the new elements would be a Little Mermaid dark ride, much like the one slated for construction in California. Under the Sea: Journey of the Little Mermaid opened on December 6, 2012.

On March 20, 2014, the attraction at Disney California Adventure closed for maintenance. It reopened May 10, 2014 with several enhancements; new sea creature figures were added throughout the ride, a view of King Triton's castle was added, the "Under the Sea" scene was given a blacklight treatment, and the Ariel and Prince Eric figures' sculpted hair was replaced with realistic hair in the "kiss the girl" and "finale" scenes.

== Summary ==
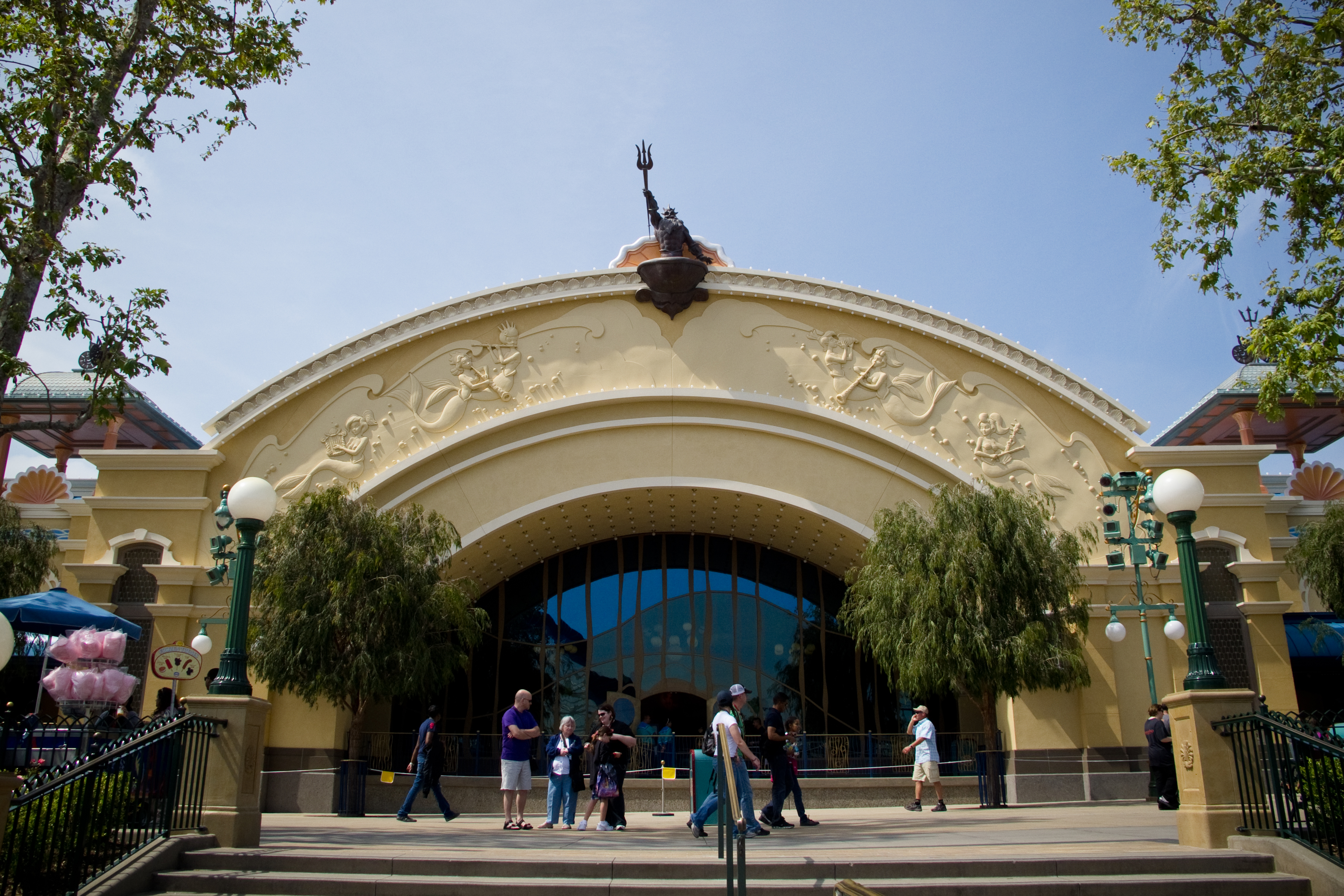
The exterior of the show building at Disney California Adventure is modeled after a 20th-century aquarium.

=== Exterior and queue ===
At Disney California Adventure, the building is modeled after a 20th-century aquarium, featuring a statue of King Triton at the top. The queue passes beneath a series of canopies and into the building itself. The loading area features a large, hand-painted mural depicting the story's major characters.

The Magic Kingdom attraction has a different exterior and queue, featuring Prince Eric's castle and the surrounding cliffs. Guests enter through a cavern at low tide, and part of the queue includes an interactive scavenger hunt with Scuttle. The mural in the loading area is also substantially different from the one at Disney California Adventure.

=== Ride ===
At both Parks, Guests board one of 105 Omnimover vehicles themed as large, colorful clamshells (Similar to the ones found at The Seas with Nemo & Friends at Epcot). These proceed through an opening in the broken hull of Prince Eric's ship. Scuttle greets the Guests and makes a muddled attempt to tell them all about Ariel's story, while the instrumental version of "Fathoms Below" plays behind him. The clamshells then rotate backwards as they make their way along the beach and descend "underwater" (an effect achieved through projections and blasts of cold air). As they continue their descent, the clamshells travel through rocky underwater passages filled with seaweed and coral (in Disney California Adventure, clams, fish, seahorses, and starfish can be seen in the passages as well.) Ariel and Flounder can be seen briefly through an opening overhead.

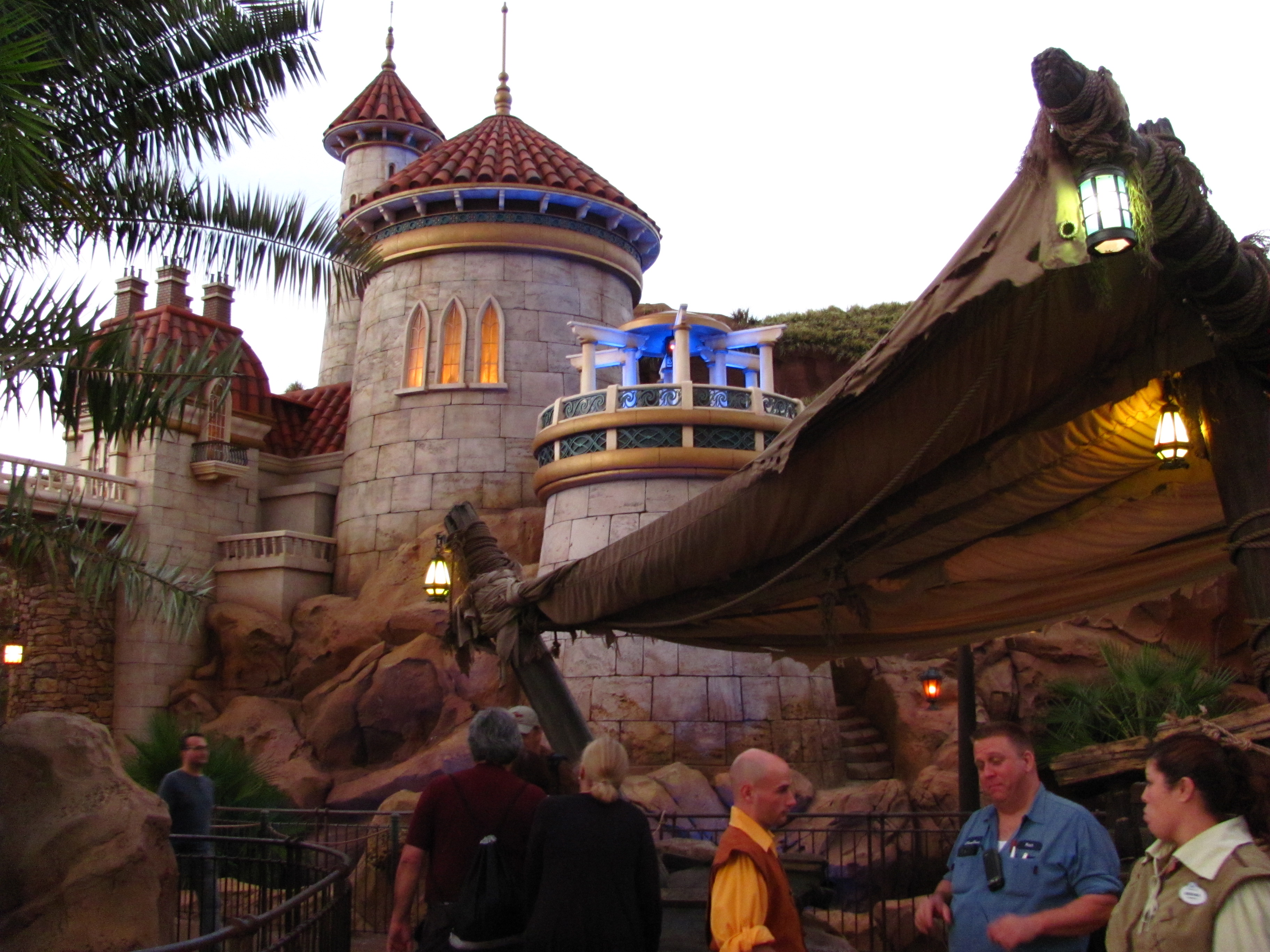
Facade of the attraction at the Magic Kingdom.

The underwater passage opens to reveal Ariel in her grotto, singing "Part of Your World." She is surrounded by her collection of treasures from the human world. Flounder floats along beside her while Sebastian occasionally appears among the bric-à-brac. As he reminds Ariel about the wonders of being under the sea, King Triton's castle can be seen in the distance, and the scene opens up to a large underwater garden where Sebastian conducts dozens of singing, dancing sea creatures through the song "Under the Sea."

The celebration fades as Flotsam and Jetsam, Ursula's pet eels, welcome the Guests to the sea witch's lair. The clamshells pass into the mouth of an enormous beast's skeleton and find Ursula singing "Poor, Unfortunate Souls" inside, standing at her crystal ball and surrounded by her collection of lost souls. Ahead, a vortex of light surrounds Ariel as she trades her voice for a pair of human legs.

The clamshells ascend among projected bubbles and splash onto the shore of a lagoon. Sebastian sings "Kiss the Girl" while Eric and Ariel sit together in a boat, leaning in to kiss each other before backing away sheepishly. After leaving the lagoon, the clamshells pass before a doorway to Prince Eric's castle, where silhouettes of Ariel and Eric are seen finally kissing. A golden orb glows from within Ariel's neck, signifying that she has regained her voice. The orb proceeds to encircle the two, creating a heart shape as Ariel and Eric kiss. The smoking silhouette of a giant, defeated Ursula is visible on the horizon.

The clamshells proceed into the final scene of the attraction, where King Triton, Sebastian, Flounder, and several sea creatures celebrate the wedding of Ariel and Eric. The couple waves goodbye from a gazebo on the ocean's edge. Fireworks explode in the sky overhead. As the clamshells pass into the unload area, Scuttle finishes his story by exclaiming that he is "not such a bird-brain after all."

The attraction offers 103 standard clamshells, as well as two wheelchair-accessible vehicles (WAV's) for Guests who are unable to transfer from their wheelchair.

== Music ==
Arranger Danny Troob adapted Alan Menken's original songs for the attraction. He also wrote an orchestral medley for the loading area, several transitional cues, and a new arrangement for the finale. Some of the scenes use the original vocal performances from the film, with Jodi Benson providing the voice of Ariel and Pat Carroll providing the voice of Ursula. With new voice actors Phillip Lawrence as Sebastian, Chris Edgerly as Scuttle, and Corey Burton as Flotsam and Jetsam.

== See also ==
- 2011 in amusement parks
- 2012 in amusement parks
- The Little Mermaid (1989 film)
- Magic Kingdom
- Disney California Adventure
