= Redwood (disambiguation) =

Redwood is a common name for Sequoioideae, a subfamily of coniferous trees.

Redwood or Redwood Tree may also refer to:

== Arts and entertainment ==
- The Redwoods, a 1967 short documentary film
- Redwood (band), English alternative rock
- Three Dog Night, American rock band originally known as Redwood (1967–1968)
- Redwood (album), by Lúnasa, 2003
- "Redwood Tree" (song), by Van Morrison, 1972
- "Redwoods", a 2012 song by Scale the Summit
- Redwood (musical), by Kate Diaz and Tina Landau

== Businesses and organisations ==
=== Businesses ===
- Redwood Games, an American creator of educational video games
- Redwood Group, now ESR Group, a real estate services and investment company
- Redwood Library and Athenaeum, in Newport, Rhode Island, U.S.
- Redwood Materials, an American company

=== Education ===
- Redwood High School (disambiguation)
- Redwood Middle School (disambiguation)
- College of the Redwoods, Eureka, California, U.S.

== People ==
- Redwood baronets, a title in the Baronetage of the United Kingdom
  - Bernard Boverton Redwood (1874–1911), British motorboat racer
  - Thomas Boverton Redwood (1846–1919), British chemical engineer
- Abraham Redwood (1709–1788), West Indies merchant, slave trader and philanthropist
- Charlie Redwood (1878–1954), Australian rugby union player
- Doug Redwood (1918–after 1939), Welsh professional footballer
- Francis Redwood (1839–1935), Roman Catholic Archbishop of Wellington
- Frederick Redwood (born 1964), Jamaican cricketer
- George Redwood (1885–1956), English footballer
- Henry Redwood (1823–1907) New Zealand farmer, politician and racehorse breeder
- Hubert Redwood (1913–1943), English professional footballer
- John Redwood (born 1951), British politician
- Stanley Redwood (born 1965), Jamaican minister and former politician
- Theophilus Redwood (1806–1892), Welsh pharmacist
- Vernon Redwood (1873–1954), Australian maltster and politician
- Zahra Redwood (born c. 1985), Miss Jamaica Universe 2007

== Places ==
=== United States ===
- Redwood City, California
  - Redwood City station
- Redwood National and State Parks, including Redwood National Park, California
- Redwood Village, San Diego, California
- Redwood (Bar Harbor, Maine), a historic house
- Redwood County, Minnesota
  - Redwood Falls, Minnesota
  - Redwood Falls Township, Redwood County, Minnesota
- Redwood, Mississippi
- Redwood, New York
- Redwood, Oregon
- Redwood, Texas
- Redwood, Virginia
- Redwood River, a tributary of the Minnesota River

=== Other countries ===
- Redwood, Queensland, Australia
- Redwood, Ontario, Canada
- Redwood, Ottawa, Canada
- Redwood, County Tipperary, Ireland
  - Redwood Castle
- Redwood, Christchurch, New Zealand
- Redwood, Wellington, New Zealand
  - Redwood railway station

== Other uses ==
- Eucalyptus transcontinentalis, commonly known as redwood
- Redwoods Lacrosse Club in the Premier Lacrosse League
- Redwood, the callsign for Virgin America
- Redwood, in TeraScale (microarchitecture)
- USS Redwood, an American net laying ship

== See also ==
- Redwood Creek (disambiguation)
- Redwood Highway (disambiguation)
- Redwood Junction station, West Valley City, Utah, U.S.
- African redwood, Hagenia
- Albino redwood, a redwood tree unable to produce chlorophyll
- Andaman redwood, Pterocarpus dalbergioides
- European redwood, Pinus sylvestris
- Indian redwood, the name of two species
- Saint Helena redwoodTrochetiopsis erythroxylon
- North Coast (California), also called the Redwood Empire or the Redwood Coast
