= Wood (surname) =

Family name

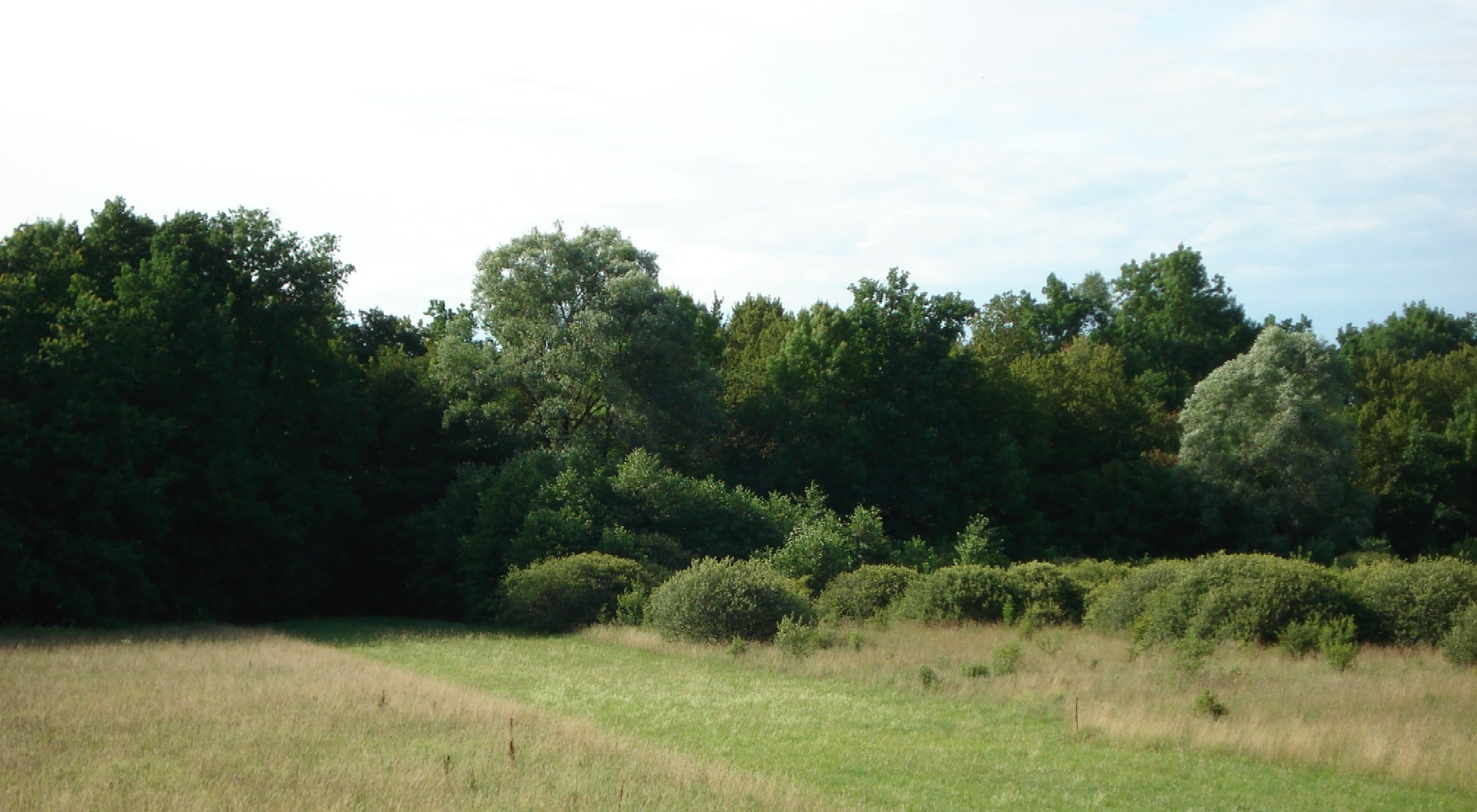
- The most common derivation of the name is from a person who resided or worked near a wood or forest.
- Gender: Unisex
- Language: English

Origin
- Language: Middle English
- Derivation: 1. wode 2. wod, wode
- Meaning: 1. "wood", "forest" 2. "mad", "frenzied"

Other names
- See also: Boyce, Quill, Woods

Wood is a surname in the English language. It is common throughout the world, especially countries with historical links to Great Britain.

== Etymology ==
For the most part, the surname Wood originated as a topographic name used to describe a person who lived in, or worked in a wood or forest. This name is derived from the Middle English wode, from the Old English wudu meaning "wood" (from the Proto-Germanic word widu). An early occurrence of this surname (of a personal residing near a wood) is de la Wode, recorded in Hertfordshire, England, in 1242. The locational name also appeared in early records Latinised as de Bosco (from the Old French bois, meaning "wood"). Another derivation for the surname is from a nickname of an eccentric or violent person, derived from the Old English wōd, wad, and Middle English wod, wode, all meaning "frenzied" or "wild". This derivation is considered to be much less common than the locational origin. An early occurrence of the surname derived in this fashion (from a nickname) is le Wode, recorded in Worcestershire, England, in 1221.

== Variations ==
Variations of the name include the surnames Woodd, Woode, Woods, Wod, and Wode. The equivalent name in German is Wald, and in many cases, emigrants from the German-speaking countries Anglicized this name to Wood when they settled in countries like the United States, Canada, Australia, South Africa, et cetera. The name "Wald" still exists, too.

The element "wood" occurs in a number of surnames often indicating a place of origin or an occupation: Woodard, Woodburn, Woodby, Woodcock, Woodforde, Woodham, Woodhouse, Woodly, Woodman, Woodruff, Woodson, Woodstock, Woodvine, Woodward, and Woodworth.

Other variations include; Blackwood, Eastwood, Greenwood, Inglewood, Hazelwood, Kirkwood, Leatherwood, Northwood, Redwood, Underwood, Westwood.

== Popularity ==
In England and Wales, and on the Isle of Man, Wood is the 26th most-common surname, in Scotland it is the 53rd most-common surname and in the United States the 78th.
