= Disney California Adventure =

Theme park in Anaheim, California

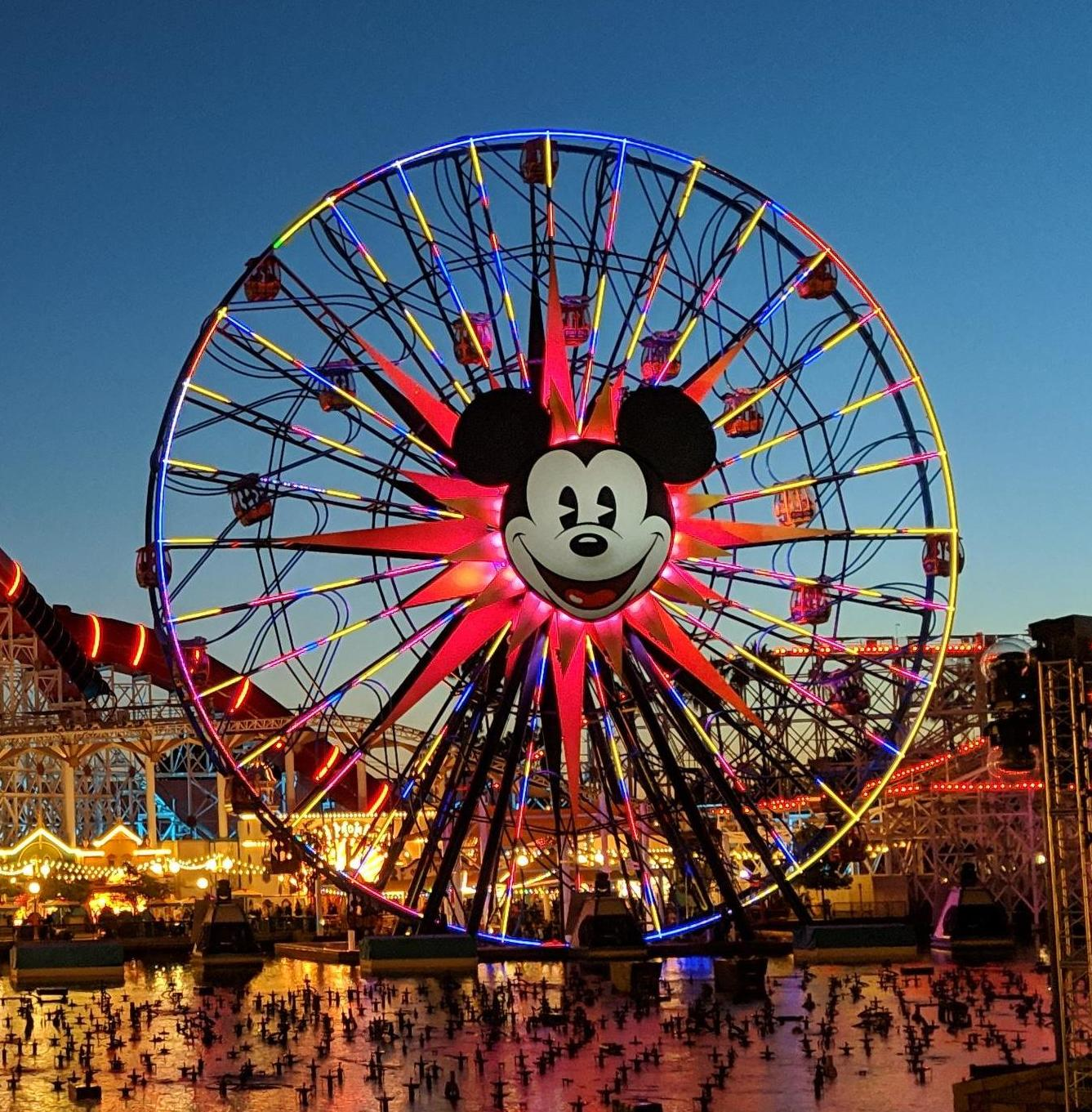
- The Pixar Pal-A-Round, the icon of Disney California Adventure, pictured in 2019
- Interactive map of Disney California Adventure
- Location: Disneyland Resort, Anaheim, California, United States
- Coordinates: 33°48′22″N 117°55′10″W
- Status: Operating
- Opened: February 8, 2001; 25 years ago
- Owner: Disney Experiences (The Walt Disney Company)
- Operated by: Disneyland Resort
- Theme: Disney’s interpretation of California
- Operating season: Year-round
- Website: Official website

Disney California Adventure is a theme park at the Disneyland Resort in Anaheim, California. It is owned and operated by the Walt Disney Company through its Experiences division. The 72-acre (29 ha) park is themed after Disney's interpretation of California, by the use of Disney Animation, Pixar and Marvel properties. The park opened on February 8, 2001, and is the second of two theme parks built at the Disneyland Resort complex after Disneyland.

The concept of a theme park dedicated to California arose from a meeting of Disney executives in 1995, following the cancellation of WestCOT, a planned West Coast version of Walt Disney World's EPCOT Center. Construction of the park began in June 1998 and was completed by early 2001. Disney initially projected high attendance rates at the new park; however, a series of preview openings held in January 2001 led to negative reviews and after the park officially opened to the public, the company's attendance projections were never met. Disney spent the next several years incrementally adding new rides, shows, and attractions, as well as implementing other promotions in an effort to boost attendance. In 2007, Disney announced a major overhaul of the park consisting of new expansion as well as re-construction of existing areas of the park. Construction lasted for five years and was completed in stages, culminating with the opening of Buena Vista Street and Cars Land along with the re-dedication of the park in June 2012.

In 2025, the park hosted approximately 10 million guests, making it the 11th-most visited theme park in the world that year.

== History ==
=== Concept and creation ===
The present-day site of Disney California Adventure was acquired by Walt Disney in the 1950s and functioned as the parking lot of Disneyland for over 40 years. After succeeding with the multi-park business model at Walt Disney World resort in Florida, the Disney company decided to turn Walt Disney's original theme park into a multi-park resort complex as well. Disneyland was boxed-in, however, because of the growth of Anaheim around the park; while the Walt Disney World property was 30,000 acres at the time, the Disneyland site was about 400. This consisted of the park itself, the 100-acre parking lot, and the newly acquired Disneyland Hotel and vacation property from the Wrather Corporation. In 1991, Disney announced plans to build WestCOT, a west coast version of what was then known as EPCOT Center, on the site of Disneyland's parking lot. The price tag of the proposed park was high and the company was facing financial and public relation problems with the newly opened Euro Disneyland (now Disneyland Paris). Additionally, Disney president Frank Wells died in a helicopter crash in 1994. These issues led Disney to cancel WestCOT in 1995.

In the summer of 1995, Michael Eisner, Disney's CEO at the time, gathered company executives in Aspen, Colorado, to think of another idea for a second theme park in California. They broke down the Disneyland problem as follows: The majority of the people visiting Disneyland consisted primarily of California residents, locals, or those traveling from nearby states. Those who were visiting from another state or another country, probably had Disneyland as one of the several attractions to do in California. Based on this, Disney decided it would instead build a park themed to California's history and culture to keep guests at the resort instead of going off-site. This would require less expensive hotels, a single parking garage, and very little additional property acquisition, with most of the park residing on the Disneyland parking lot. Then-Disneyland president Paul Pressler relied on merchandising and retail staff instead of Imagineers to design the park. As an adult-oriented park-like Epcot, dining, and shopping were the design focus. Construction of the park began on January 22, 1998. On Main Street, USA in Disneyland, a Disney's California Adventure Preview Center opened in October 1998. The park's construction was accompanied by Downtown Disney and Disney's Grand Californian Hotel, in addition to renovation of the Disneyland Hotel and the re-theming of the Disneyland Pacific Hotel into Disney's Paradise Pier Hotel (known today as Pixar Place Hotel).

=== Opening and initial criticism ===
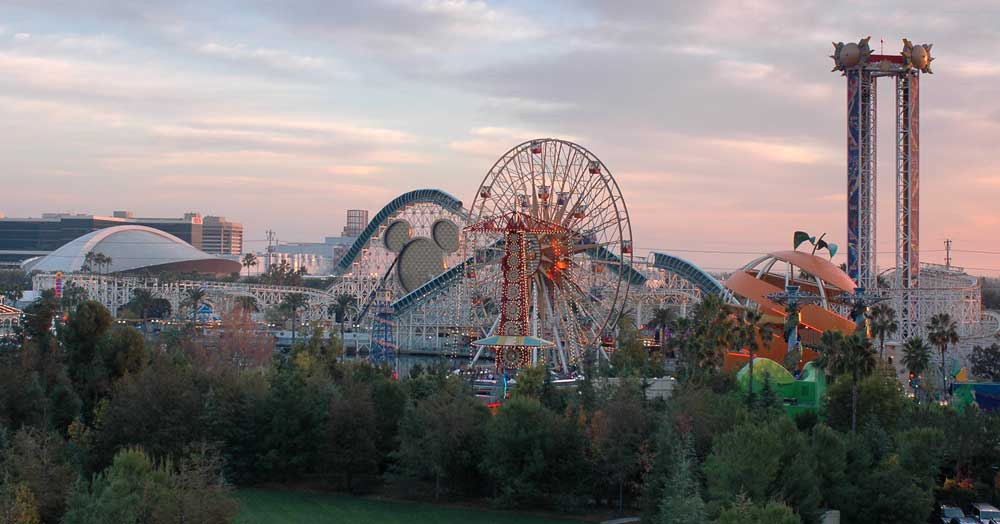
View of the park in 2006

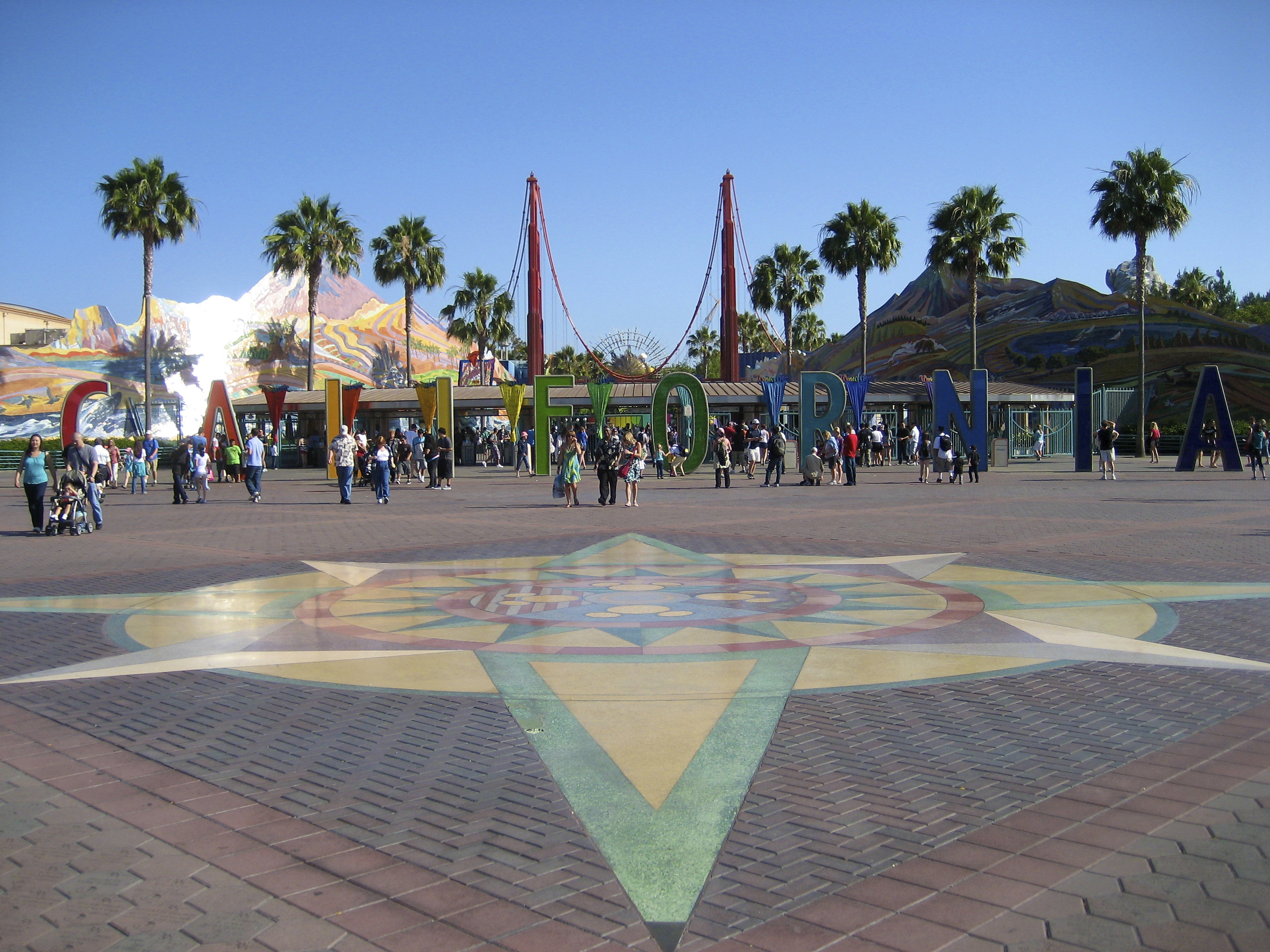
The original entrance of California Adventure, pictured in 2010

The park was expected to draw large crowds when it opened on February 8, 2001. There were four districts with 22 shows and attractions and 15 restaurants.

On January 14, a Los Angeles Times article stated, "Senior Disney officials acknowledge that there will be days when California Adventure will have to turn patrons away, particularly in the first weeks after the park opens, during spring break and again in the summer." The attendance that year was substantially less than expected, however. This is suggested to have happened as a result of negative reviews from early visitors. For example, the park was aimed at adults, rather than children and families, which became the basis of significant criticism.

The park opened to 5 million visitors in 2001 while its sister park Disneyland saw 12.3 million visitors during the same time frame. Low attendance caused Disney to lower ticket prices for California Adventure, slashing as much as $10 off the park's ticket prices. In its first year, the park averaged 5,000 to 9,000 visitors on weekdays and 10,000 to 15,000 on the weekends, despite having a capacity of 33,000. Visitor surveys reported that 20% of visitors to the park in its first year were satisfied with their experience. By October 2001, both Wolfgang Puck and Robert Mondavi had closed their high-profile restaurants in the park, citing low crowds, though Mondavi remained as a sponsor.

In the 2019 documentary series The Imagineering Story, then-Walt Disney Imagineering creative executive Kevin Rafferty described how he and other Imagineers felt about the original entrance design of California Adventure:

Much to our chagrin, it didn't adhere to our fundamental design principles of theme park design. There were all these visual cues that were kind of contradictory. There were great big California letters. There was a stylized Golden Gate Bridge that was kind of foreshortened and was kind of fake and suggested that this wasn't a real place, and the supergraphics on the toy store. And the first statement that you saw when you walked into the gate with the sharp sun. And you know, frankly, you could have seen that at a shopping mall in Newport Beach. It's like 'why is it here?'

Reflecting on the park's initial reception in The Imagineering Story, Barry Braverman, executive producer of California Adventure (1995–2001), stated:

What we really had was locals who love Disneyland for good reason, basically faced with a choice. Are you going to go to Disneyland or to California Adventure? Equally priced. One with one-third as many attractions, and fewer characters, and things that were intentional on our part to differentiate it. And that's a competition that California Adventure couldn't win.

=== Early changes and expansions ===
Two major criticisms of the park in its first year were the lack of attractions appealing to children and the lack of a nighttime show or parade to keep visitors from leaving at nightfall. Within the first year of operation, Disney's Electrical Parade was brought to the park (where it ran until 2010) as well as Who Wants to Be a Millionaire – Play It!, and several of the park's original rides and attractions were closed, such as the stage show Disney's Steps in Time and the Superstar Limo ride, which were closed in 2001 and 2002, respectively. During the 2001 holiday season, Disney's LuminAria was presented on Paradise Bay. On October 7, 2002, Flik's Fun Fair opened as part of the new A Bug's Land area, which added attractions for children, and on May 5, 2004, The Twilight Zone Tower of Terror opened, with Who Wants to Be a Millionaire – Play It! closing on August 20, 2004. The park also regularly featured seasonal promotions such as concert series, food festivals, and promotions for other Walt Disney Company franchises including the X Games and ABC soap operas. Monsters, Inc. Mike & Sulley to the Rescue! opened in the former Superstar Limo building on January 23, 2006.

=== Major redesign and expansion ===
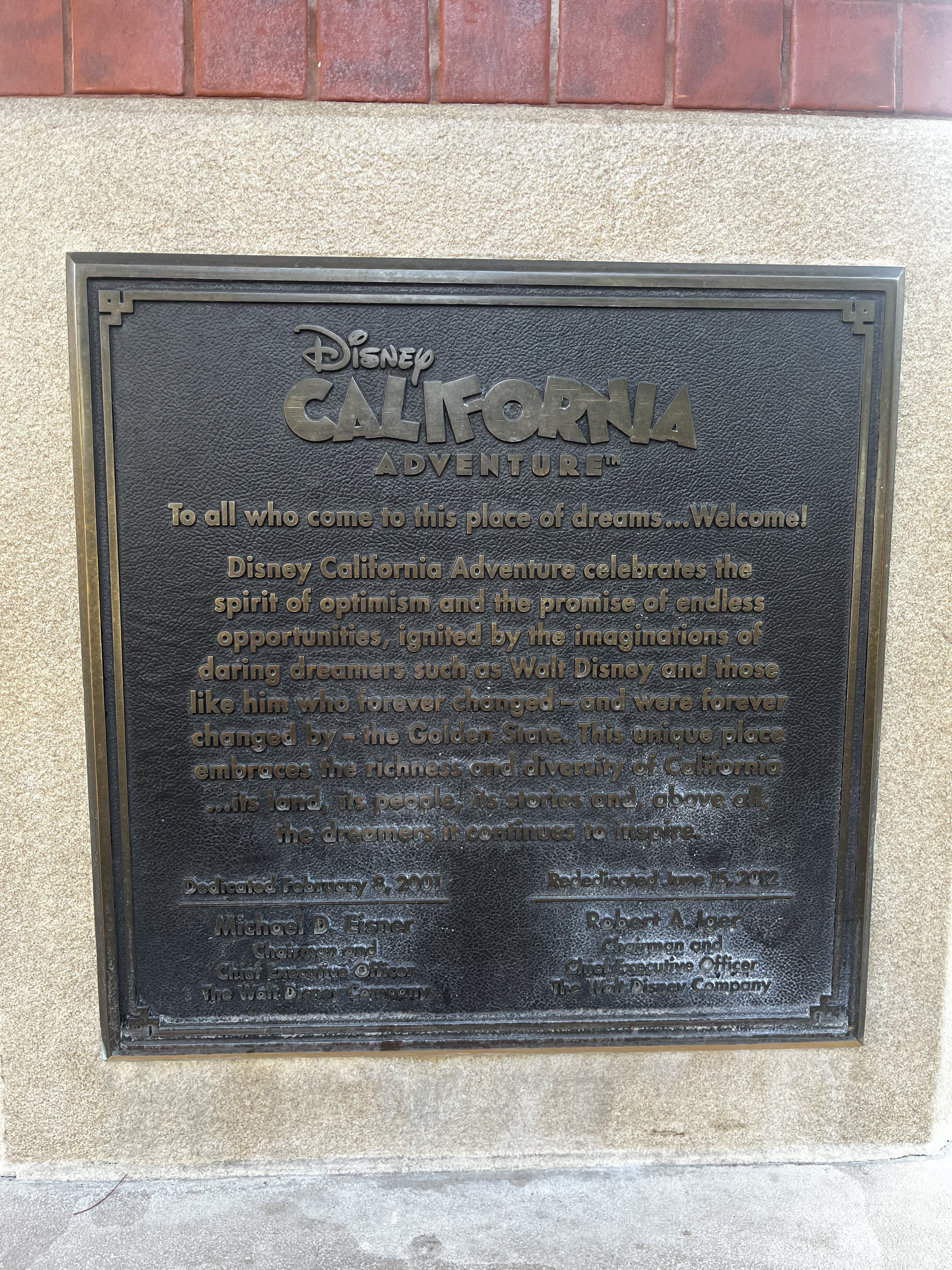
Disney's California Adventure 2012 Rededication Plaque

Re-dedication

To all who come to this place of dreams, welcome. Disney California Adventure celebrates the spirit of optimism and the promise of endless opportunities, ignited by the imagination of daring dreamers such as Walt Disney and those like him who forever changed—and was forever changed by—The Golden State. This unique place embraces the richness and diversity of California... Its land, its people, its stories, and, above all, the dreamers it continues to inspire.

— Robert A. Iger, June 15, 2012, On the plaque of the flagpole in Buena Vista Plaza on Buena Vista Street

By 2007, Disney began making plans for major updates to the park. CEO Bob Iger said, "Any time you do something mediocre with your brand, that's withdrawal. California Adventure was a brand withdrawal." Iger briefly considered combining California Adventure and Disneyland Park into one large park, but the price would have cost as much as completely remodeling California Adventure. On October 17, 2007, the Walt Disney Company announced a multi-year, $1.1 billion redesign and expansion plan for Disney's California Adventure Park (against its initial $600 million cost to build). Each district was reimagined to transform the park from a spoof of modern California culture to a romanticized, idealized version of the state, exploring specific time periods and historic settings inspired by Disney and Pixar stories. The project began in December 2007 and was completed in stages. Toy Story Midway Mania! opened in Paradise Pier on June 17, 2008, in space formerly occupied by a store and restaurants. World of Color, nighttime water and lights show on Paradise Bay, opened on June 11, 2010. That same year, the park also received a modified name; Disney California Adventure. The Little Mermaid: Ariel's Undersea Adventure opened on the site formerly occupied by the Golden Dreams theater on June 3, 2011.

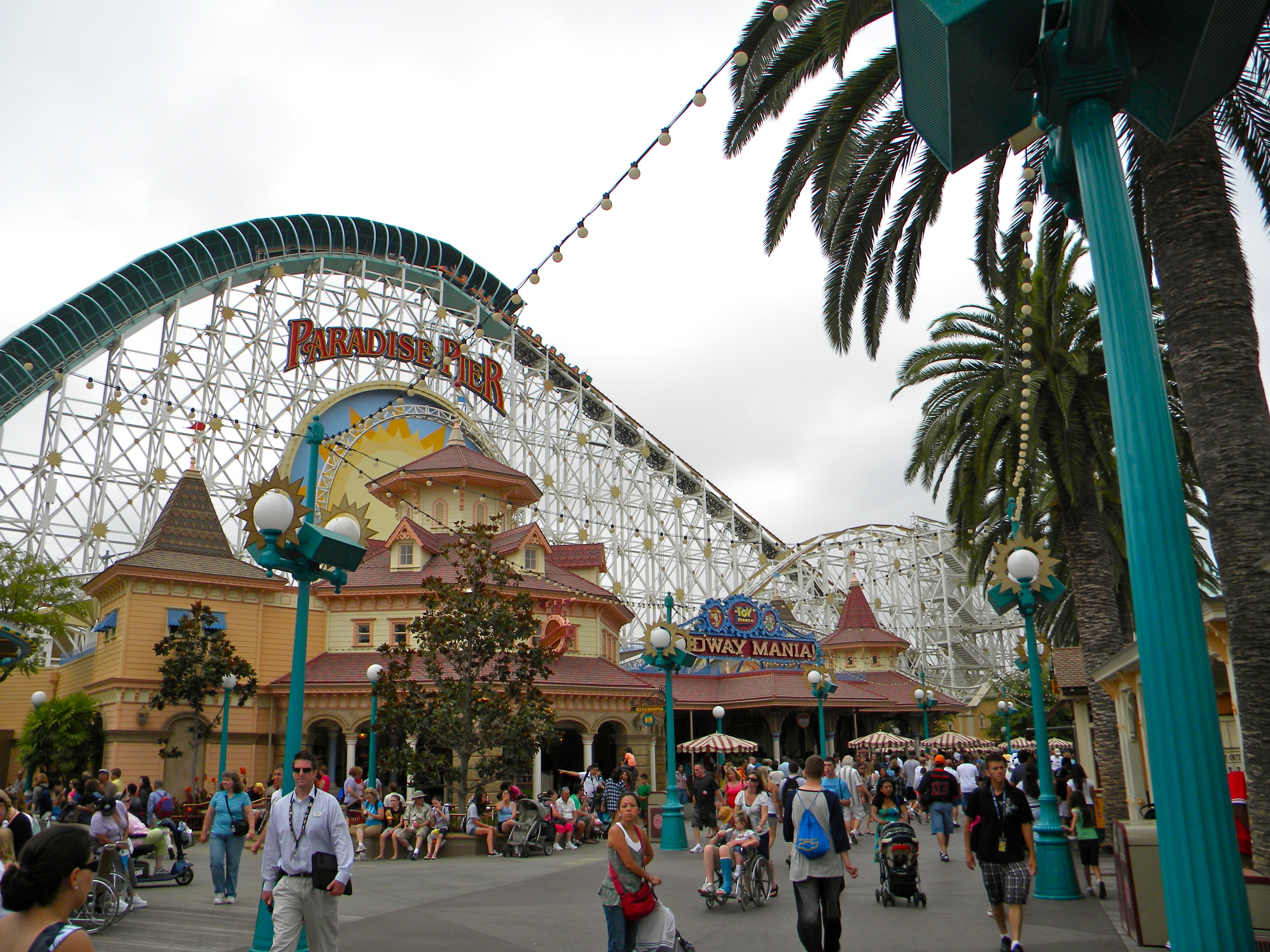
Victorian-style architecture in Paradise Pier in 2010

The most drastic changes to the park included a complete overhaul of the main entrance, Sunshine Plaza, and Paradise Pier and an expansion into the last of the parking area originally designated as future growth space for the park. The main entrance and Sunshine Plaza were changed from a giant postcard design into Buena Vista Street, a representation of Los Angeles as it appeared when Walt Disney moved there in the 1920s. The giant "California" letters in front of the turnstiles were removed and donated to Cal Expo in Sacramento. Paradise Pier was turned from a contemporary representation of California boardwalks into a representation of Victorian seaside amusement parks of the 1920s, and some of the area's off-the-shelf rides were either removed outright, (such as Maliboomer), or re-themed to have more of a focus on Disney characters (such as Mickey's Fun Wheel, Goofy's Sky School, and Silly Symphony Swings). Cars Land, an area that recreates Radiator Springs from Pixar's Cars franchise, was added to the southeast portion of the park and features three rides, including the E ticket Radiator Springs Racers. Construction was completed in 2012 and the park was then re-dedicated on June 15, 2012.

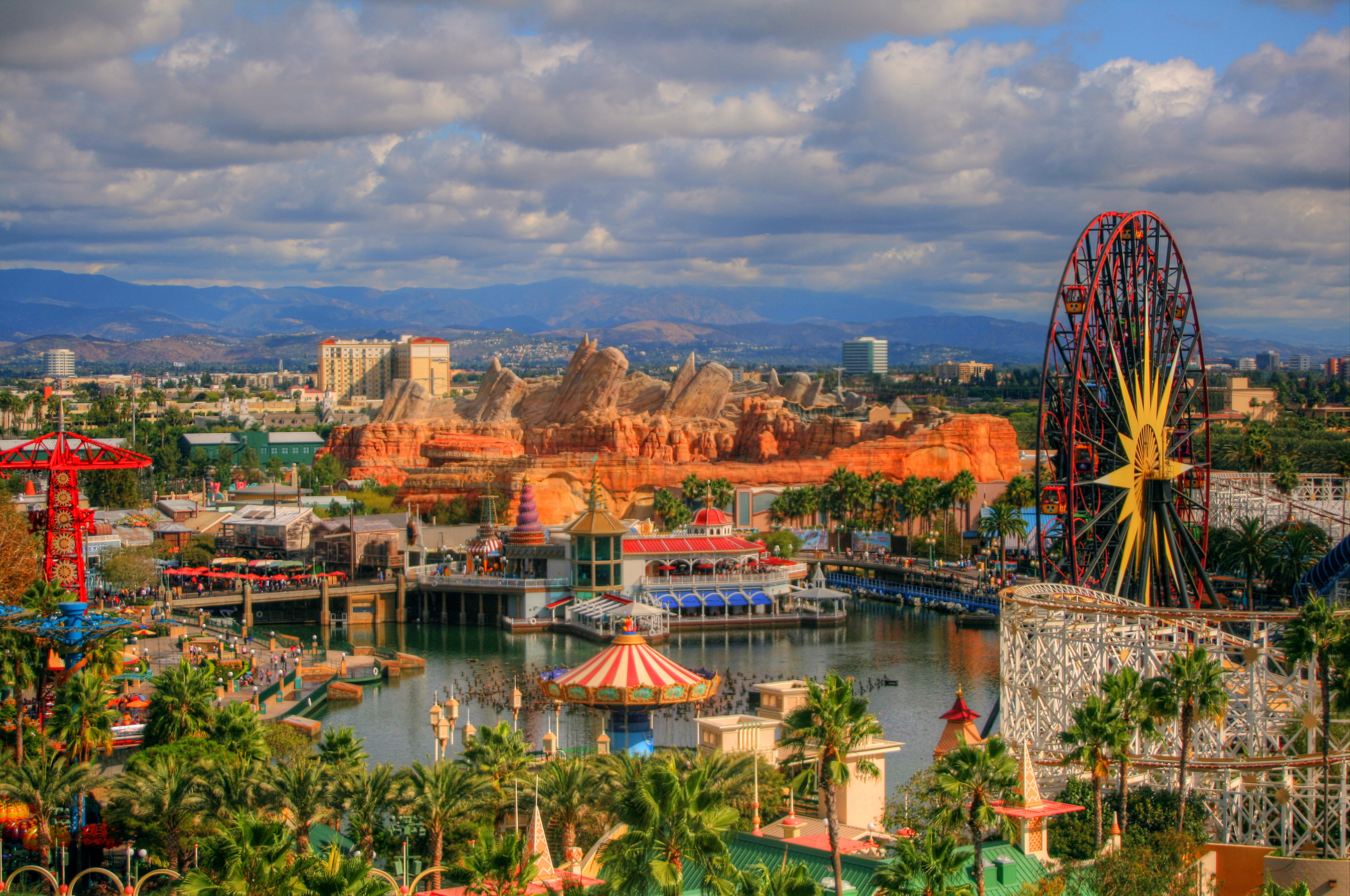
View of the park in 2012

The redesign and expansion of the park saw attendance rates increase dramatically. In 2012, Disney California Adventure reached a record high for the park of over 7 million visitors (a 23% increase from the year before), a number Disney had hoped the park would attain in its first year. The day of the park's rededication saw the park draw a record number of 43,000 visitors in one day. The night before the rededication, over 500 people camped outside of the park in order to be the first admitted in. Two days later, the park hit a new record of 45,000 visitors. In 2013, speaking on the attendance increase at Disney California Adventure, Jay Rasulo, then-Disney's chief financial officer, said: "We had a very uneven distribution where most people spent most of their time at Disneyland and Disney's California Adventure was empty. Now, half of the folks go to one, half of the folks go to the other. It's almost a dream come true."

=== Subsequent updates ===
In 2015, the Condor Flats area of the park was re-themed into Grizzly Peak Airfield and was incorporated into the Grizzly Peak area. The Twilight Zone Tower of Terror closed on January 3, 2017 and was replaced with Guardians of the Galaxy – Mission: Breakout!, which opened on May 27, 2017. Pixar Pier, a re-theme of Paradise Pier, debuted on June 23, 2018, with the area that includes Silly Symphony Swings, Jumpin' Jellyfish, Goofy's Sky School, Golden Zephyr and The Little Mermaid: Ariel's Undersea Adventure becoming Paradise Gardens Park. On September 4, 2018, A Bug's Land was removed to make room for Avengers Campus. In addition, Jessie's Critter Carousel (a re-theme of King Triton's Carousel of the Sea) officially opened in Pixar Pier on April 5, 2019, and A Bug's Land spinner ride Flik's Flyers was re-themed into Inside Out Emotional Whirlwind and relocated to Pixar Pier later that year at the former site of Maliboomer. Avengers Campus opened on June 4, 2021, with the adjacent Guardians of the Galaxy – Mission: Breakout! then becoming part of it. San Fransokyo Square, a re-theme of the Pacific Wharf area, debuted in late August 2023.

=== COVID-19 pandemic closure in 2020, partial and full reopening in 2021 ===
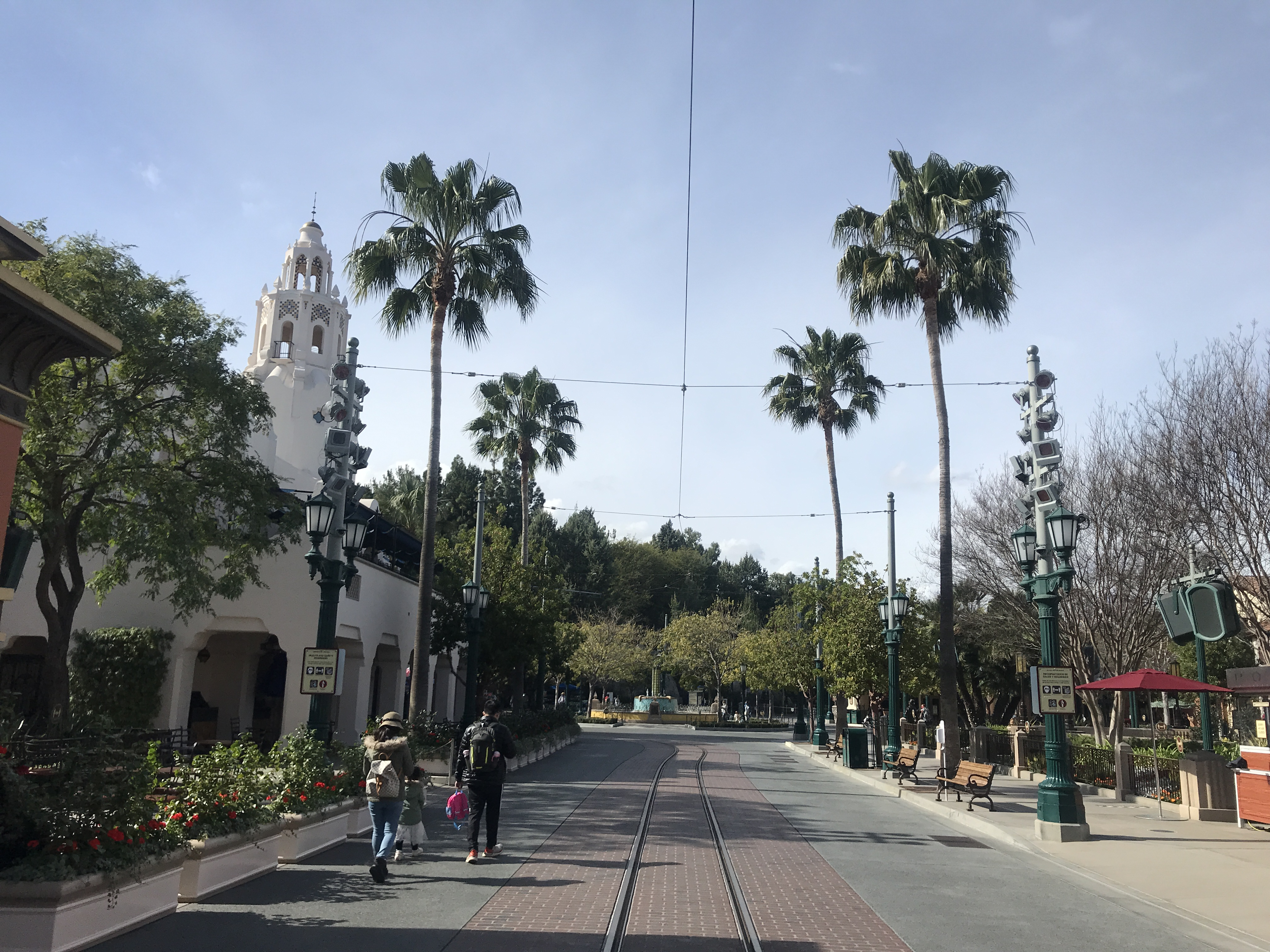
Buena Vista Street during the partial reopening in the wake of the COVID-19 pandemic (January 2021)

Disney California Adventure, along with the rest of the Disneyland Resort, was closed indefinitely starting on March 14, 2020, in response to the COVID-19 pandemic. The park was scheduled to reopen alongside Disneyland Park on July 17, but due to rising cases in California, both parks remained closed. In October 2020, it was announced that Buena Vista Street would open as an expansion of the Downtown Disney District. This expansion would allow for additional shops and dining options for visitors to the Disneyland Resort, while the parks remained closed under State guidelines. In February 2021, Disney California Adventure announced there would be a limited-capacity ticketed event called "A Touch of Disney", which would allow Disney fans to shop and eat around the park from March 18 through April 19, 2021. On March 5, 2021, it was announced by the California Department of Public Health that Disney California Adventure was allowed to reopen with capacity restrictions beginning April 1, 2021. Then-Disney CEO Bob Chapek then announced the following week that the company planned on officially reopening the park in late April 2021. On March 17, 2021, Disney Parks, Experiences and Products announced that both Disney California Adventure and Disneyland would officially reopen on April 30, 2021, with limited capacity and social distancing and mask guidelines in effect. Mask policies were relaxed at the Disneyland Resort in the summer of 2021, but ultimately were reinstated for indoor shops and attractions in July in response to the Delta variant. In February 2022, masks were made optional for guests who are fully vaccinated.

== Park layout and attractions ==
Disney California Adventure is divided into nine themed lands; Buena Vista Street, Hollywood Land, Avengers Campus, Cars Land, San Fransokyo Square, Performance Corridor, Pixar Pier, Paradise Gardens Park, and Grizzly Peak.

Lands of Disney California Adventure

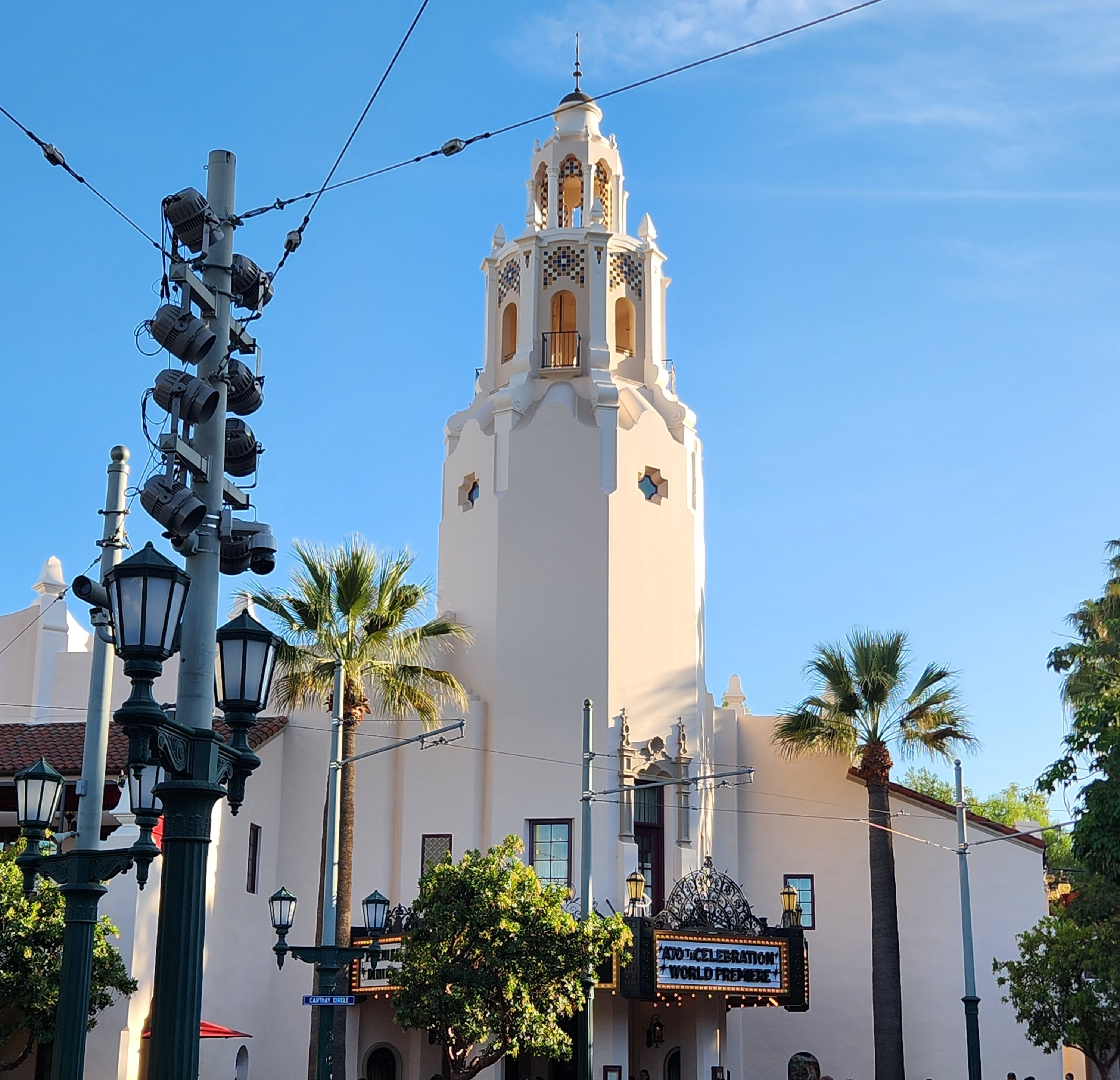
Buena Vista Street (Carthay Circle Restaurant)

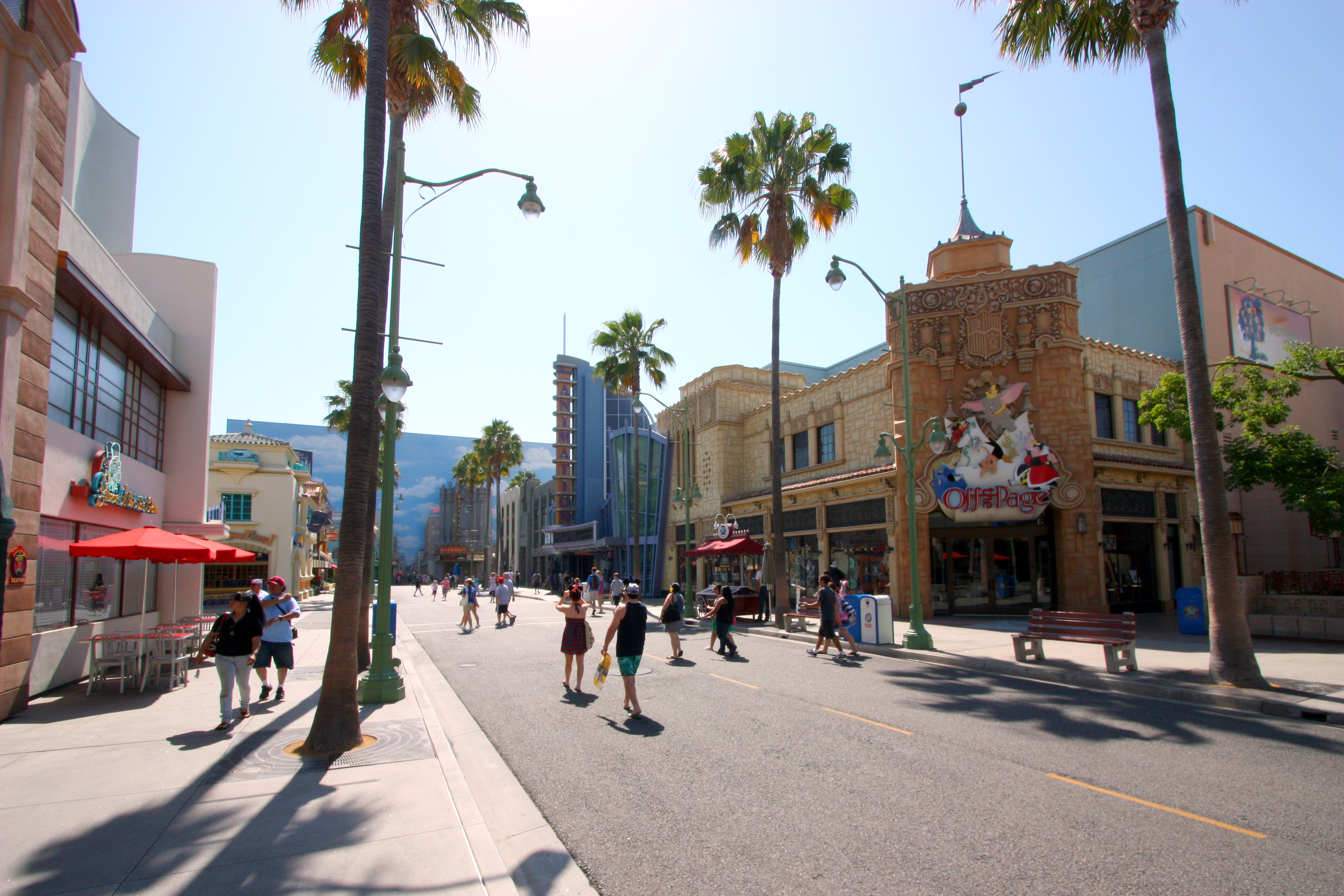
Hollywood Land (pictured in 2009)

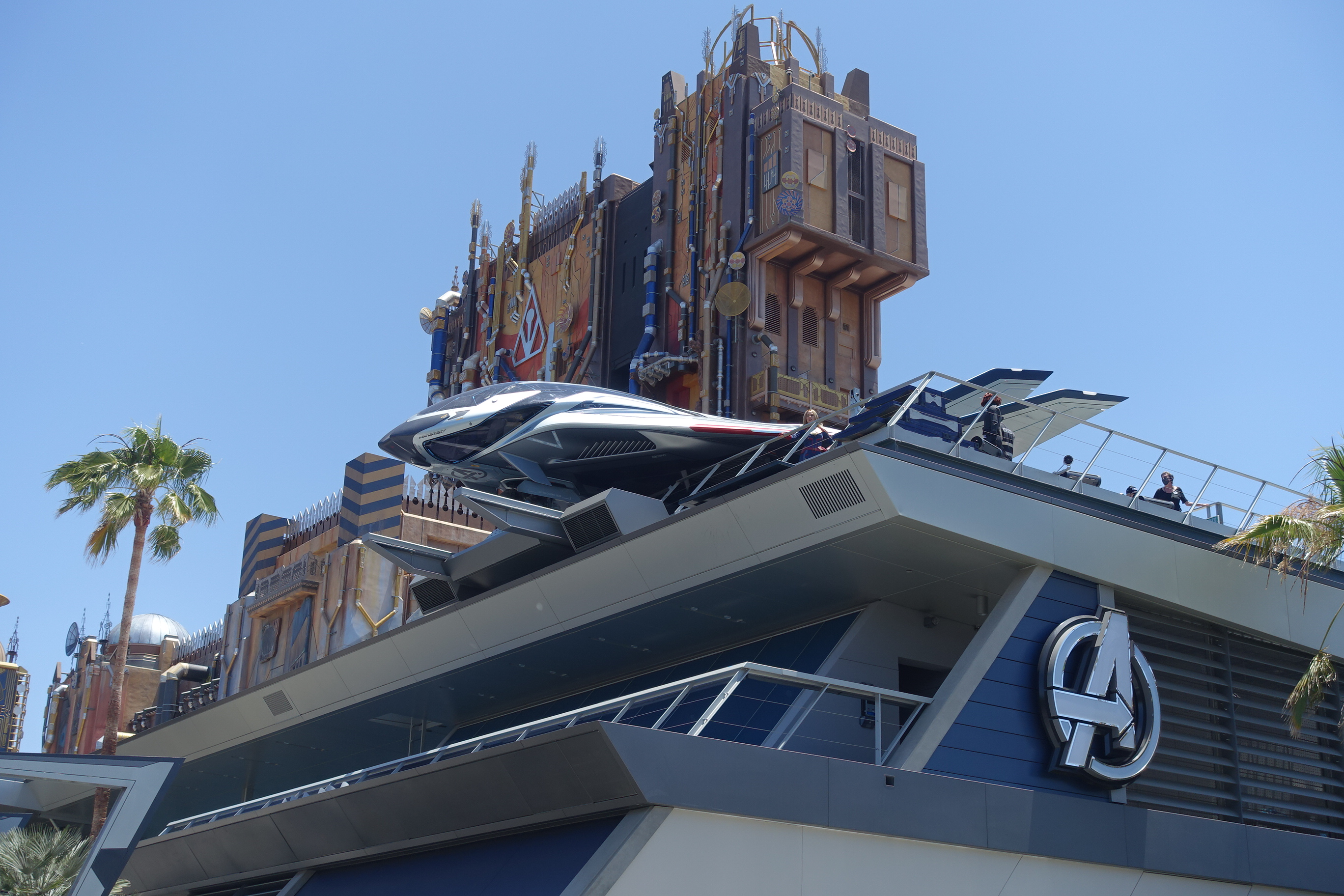
Avengers Campus

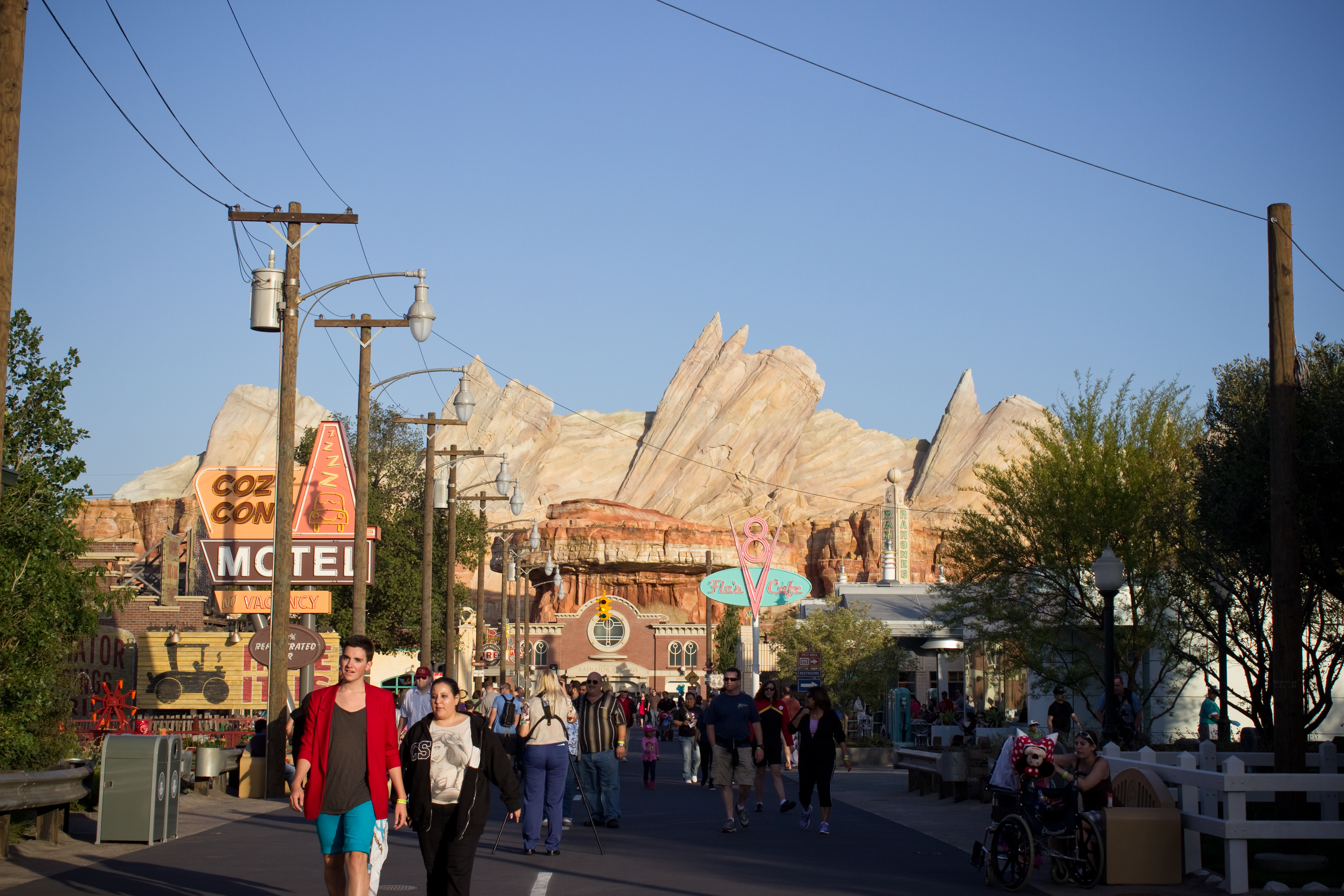
Cars Land

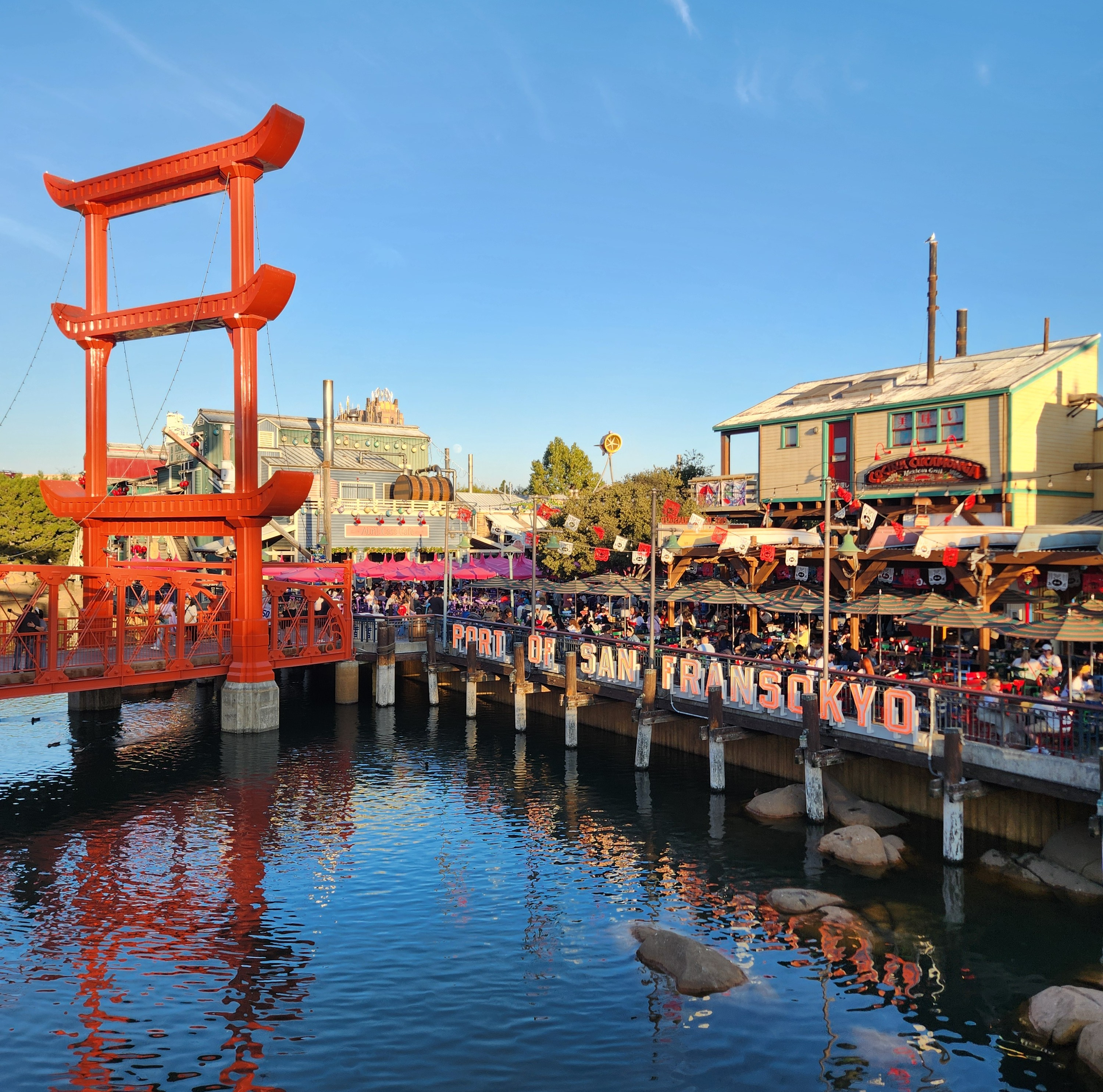
San Fransokyo Square

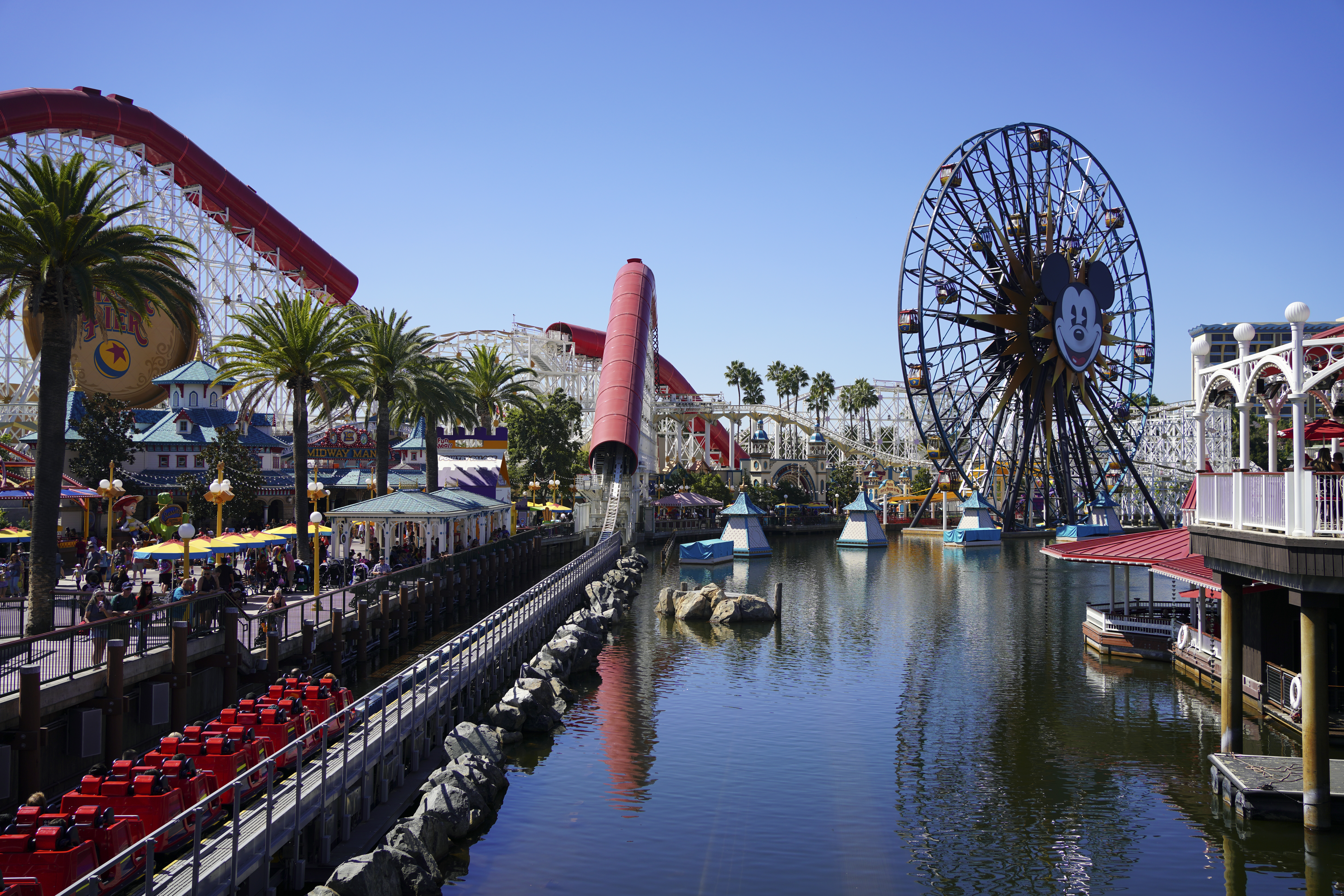
Pixar Pier

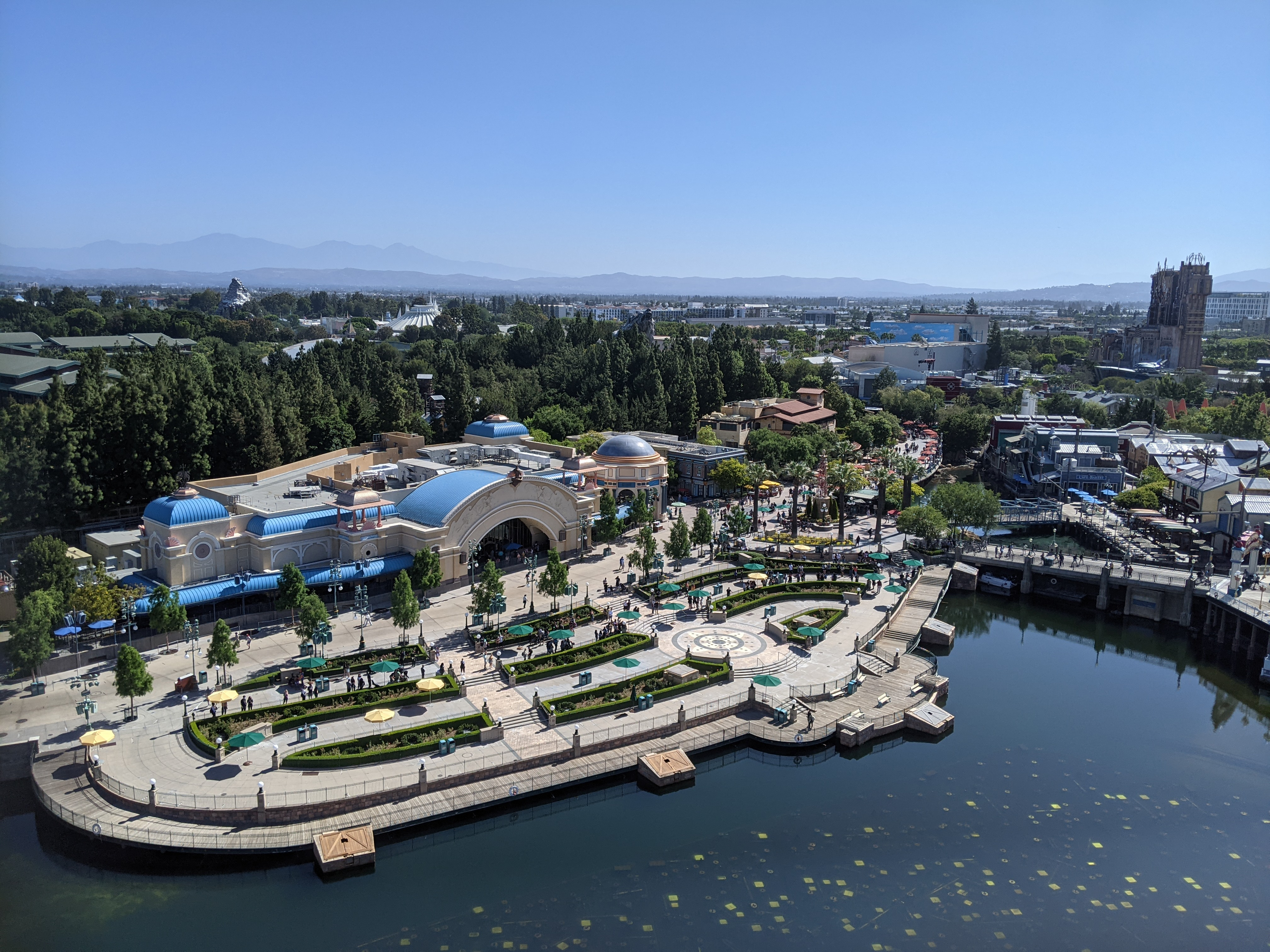
Paradise Gardens

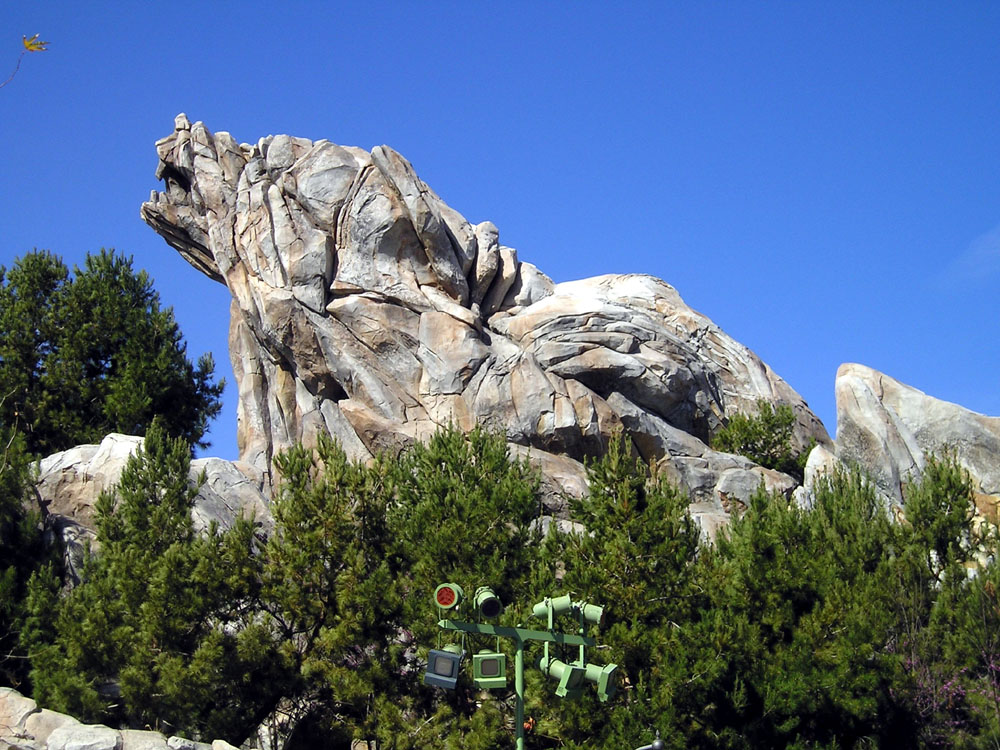
Grizzly Peak

=== Buena Vista Street ===
Buena Vista Street is the first area seen upon entering the park. It represents Los Angeles in the 1920s, when Walt Disney first arrived there. Similar to Main Street, USA in Disneyland Park, it has shops and restaurants. Its central hub has entrances to Hollywood Land and Grizzly Peak. In the hub's center, also known as Carthay Circle, is a replica of the Carthay Circle Theater, where Disney Animation's first feature film Snow White and the Seven Dwarfs debuted in 1937. Restaurants include Mortimer's Market, Trolley Treats, Clarabelle's Hand Scooped Ice Cream, Fiddler, Fifer & Practical Cafe, and Carthay Circle Restaurant. Main stores along the street include Oswald's, Five & Dime, Big Top Toys, Kingswell Camera Shop, and Elias & Co.

=== Hollywood Land ===
Hollywood Land is inspired by the Golden Age of Hollywood in the 1930s. It includes attractions based on film, television, theater and a subsection called Hollywood Studios, which is designed to appear as an active studio backlot. Found within that subsection is the 3D film Mickey's PhilharMagic and the Monsters, Inc. Mike & Sulley to the Rescue! attraction, a dark ride based on the characters from Pixar's 2001 film Monsters, Inc.. The land is also home to the 2000-seat Hyperion Theater.

Disney Junior – Live on Stage! opened on March 25, 2011, in the Disney Theater. Its final day of performance was April 9, 2017. It was replaced by Disney Junior Dance Party, which opened on May 26, 2017, until the final performance on March 23, 2025. It was announced that was replaced by a new show, Disney Jr. Mickey Mouse Clubhouse Live!, which opened May 16, 2025. Nearby Disney Theater is the Animation Building, which hosts Sorcerer's Workshop (a walk-through exhibit focused on basic animation), Animation Academy (a workshop that teaches guests how to draw Disney characters), Turtle Talk with Crush, and a meet and greet with Anna and Elsa. Outside of the Animation Building and Disney Theater are the land's two main stores: Off the Page and Gone Hollywood.

The restroom facilities in the district are designed in the style of Frank Lloyd Wright's Storer House, located in the Hollywood Hills area of Los Angeles. The stamped concrete structure is typical of Wright's pioneering design.

=== Avengers Campus ===
Avengers Campus is inspired by the Marvel Cinematic Universe (MCU), featuring attractions based on characters originating from Marvel Comics appearing in MCU media. The area is anchored around an Avengers campus located on the former restricted grounds of a California Stark Industries and Strategic Scientific Reserve complex. Attractions and restaurants include Guardians of the Galaxy – Mission: Breakout!, Web Slingers: A Spider-Man Adventure, and Pym Test Kitchen. The area's shops include WEB Suppliers, Avengers Vault, and The Collector's Warehouse.

=== Cars Land ===
Cars Land is a tribute to Route 66 and is a recreation of the town of Radiator Springs from Pixar's Cars franchise on the town's big race day. The land spans 12 acres (49,000 m^{2}) and contains three attractions. The largest attraction, Radiator Springs Racers, is a dark ride that utilizes the technology of Test Track at Epcot. With a budget of an estimated US$200 million, Radiator Springs Racers is the most expensive theme park ride ever built.

The other attractions at Cars Land are family attractions with smaller height requirements: Mater's Junkyard Jamboree and Luigi's Rollickin' Roadsters. Mater's Junkyard Jamboree opened with Cars Land in 2012. Luigi's Rollickin' Roadsters opened on March 7, 2016, and replaced Luigi's Flying Tires.

The land includes several dining and shopping venues. The district serves as a connection between San Fransokyo Square, Hollywood Land, and Avengers Campus.

Starting in 2017, Cars Land receives Halloween decorations during Halloween Time at the Disneyland Resort. Two attractions, Luigi's Rollickin' Roadsters and Mater's Junkyard Jamboree, became Luigi's Honkin' Haul-O-Ween and Mater's Graveyard JamBOOree. Cars Land also receives holiday overlays, where Luigi's Rollickin' Roadsters becomes Luigi's Joy to the Whirl, and Mater's Junkyard Jamboree becomes Mater's Jingle Jamboree.

=== San Fransokyo Square ===
Located between Cars Land and Pixar Pier, San Fransokyo Square is a waterfront neighborhood inspired by California's fishing wharfs. San Fransokyo, as seen in Disney Animation's 2014 film Big Hero 6, is a combination of San Francisco and Tokyo. The story of San Fransokyo Square is set after the events of the film, with the waterfront neighborhood holding a celebration in honor of the Big Hero 6 superhero team. Most of the signage in the area includes Japanese translations. The area's restaurants include Ghirardelli Soda Fountain and Chocolate Shop, Lucky Fortune Cookery, Aunt Cass Café (Boudin Bakery), Rita's Turbine Blenders, Cocina Cucamonga Mexican Grill, and Port of San Fransokyo Cervecería (Karl Strauss Brewing Company). The area's shops include San Fransokyo Maker's Market. San Fransokyo Square is also home to The Bakery Tour.

=== Performance Corridor ===
The Performance Corridor area hosts the park's parades and cavalcades, with most starting in Paradise Gardens Park and traveling north through the Performance Corridor towards Buena Vista Street. The Performance Corridor area hosts many of the Resort's seasonal and cultural celebrations throughout the year. Some of these celebrations include the Disney California Adventure Food & Wine Festival in the spring, the Dia de los Muertos celebration during the fall (with two shows, A Musical Celebration of Coco and Mariachi Divas), the Festival of the Holidays (with "Disney Viva Navidad Street Party" and "Mickey's Happy Holidays"), and the Lunar New Year Festival (with "Mulan's Lunar New Year Processional"). The area has no attractions, but several dining locations.

=== Pixar Pier ===
Pixar Pier is inspired by Victorian boardwalks that were once found along the coast of California. The area is themed after films produced by Pixar Animation Studios, and is divided into four districts; Incredibles Park, Toy Story Boardwalk, Pixar Promenade, and Inside Out Headquarters. Its attractions include the Pixar Pal-A-Round, Incredicoaster, Jessie's Critter Carousel, Games of Pixar Pier, Toy Story Midway Mania, and the Inside Out Emotional Whirlwind. Its main stores are Knick's Knacks, Midway Mercantile, and Bing Bong's Sweet Stuff, and offers table-service dining at the Lamplight Lounge. It is connected to Paradise Gardens Park at both ends; its main entrance is via a bridge under a large Pixar Pier gateway.

=== Paradise Gardens Park ===
Paradise Gardens Park has direct entrances to Pixar Pier, San Fransokyo Square and Grizzly Peak. Paradise Gardens Park is the main viewing area for the World of Color water show. Paradise Garden's attractions include Goofy's Sky School, Silly Symphony Swings, Jumpin' Jellyfish, Golden Zephyr, and The Little Mermaid: Ariel's Undersea Adventure.

=== Grizzly Peak ===
Grizzly Peak is themed around California's wilderness and national parks, with particular references to Yosemite and Redwood national parks. Its main attraction is Grizzly River Run, a Gold Rush-esque river rapids ride around the area's summit. Nearby is the Redwood Creek Challenge Trail, a playground area with elements from Disney Animation's Brother Bear (2003). In addition, Grizzly Peak has an entrance exclusively accessible to guests of Disney's Grand Californian Hotel & Spa.

Grizzly Peak Airfield is a sub-land within Grizzly Peak, themed to an airfield in California's High Sierras in the late 1950s and early 1960s. The area's main attraction is Soarin', which simulates a hang-glider tour of locations, landscapes and landmarks across six of the world's continents. The area also includes the Smokejumpers Grill restaurant, the shop Humphrey's Service & Supplies, and a decorative fire lookout tower.

== Future attractions ==
The park will receive two attractions for Avengers Campus; Avengers Infinity Defense and Stark Flight Lab, both scheduled to open in 2028. In addition, a ride based on Pixar's 2017 film Coco will be built near Pixar Pier and Paradise Gardens Park, and an area inspired by 20th Century Studios' 2022 film Avatar: The Way of Water, 2025 film Avatar: Fire and Ash and future Avatar films will be built in a portion of the park's Hollywood Backlot.

== Former areas ==
=== Sunshine Plaza ===
Sunshine Plaza was the first land guests would find after entering Disney California Adventure. It featured two stores, Engine Ears Toys and Greetings from California. At the center of the plaza was the "Sun Icon".

The land closed in 2010 and was replaced by Buena Vista Street in 2012.

=== Bountiful Valley Farm ===
Bountiful Valley Farm was a themed area presented by Caterpillar. It featured farm equipment and various crops growing. When A Bug's Land opened in 2002, the district was absorbed into the land. Caterpillar ended their sponsorship in 2007 and the area closed in 2010. It was replaced by Cars Land.

=== Paradise Pier ===
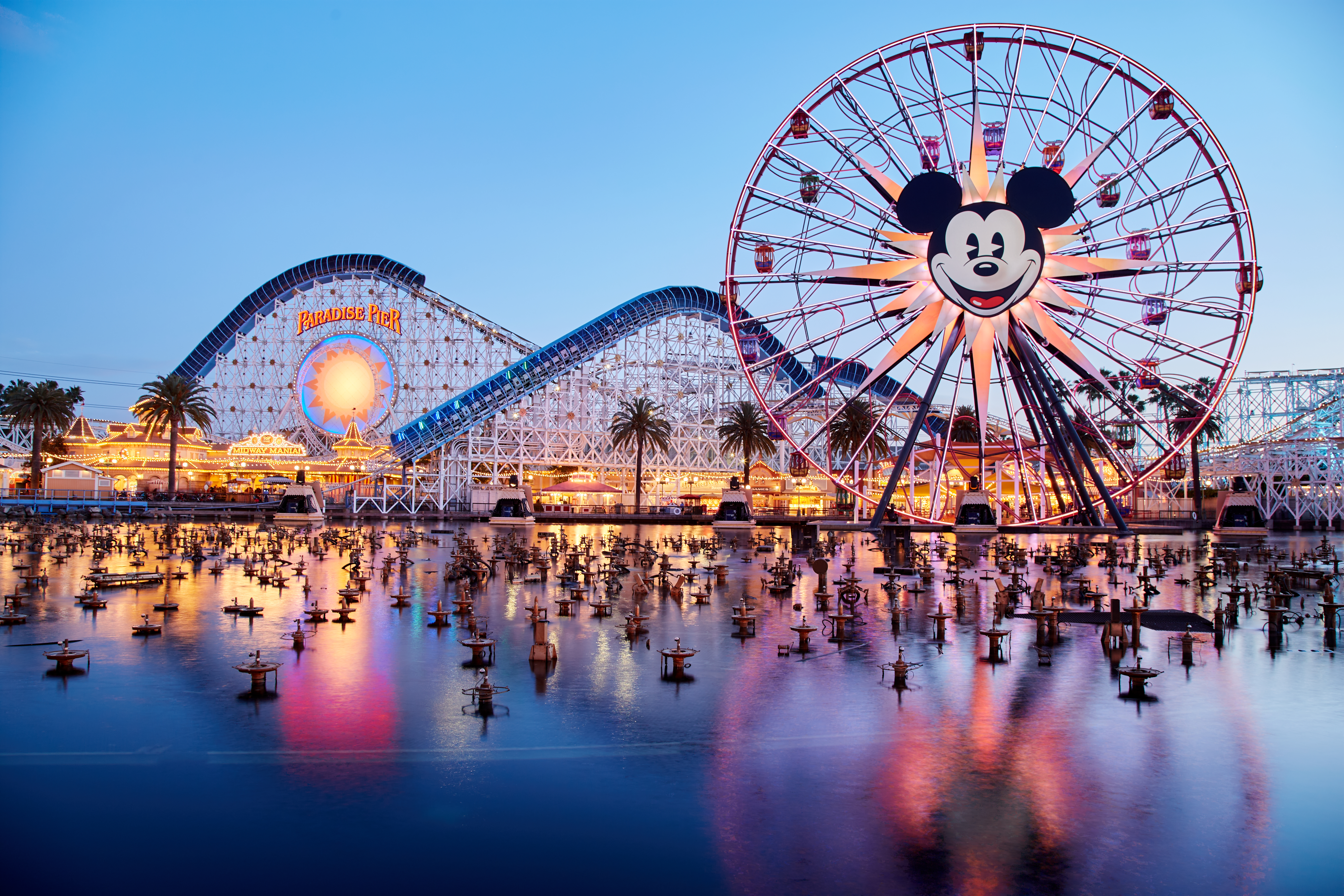
Paradise Bay in 2016

Paradise Pier opened in 2001 with the park. It featured attractions such as California Screamin', Maliboomer, The Sun Wheel and King Triton's Carousel of the Sea. The land closed in 2018 and reopened as Pixar Pier.

=== A Bug's Land ===
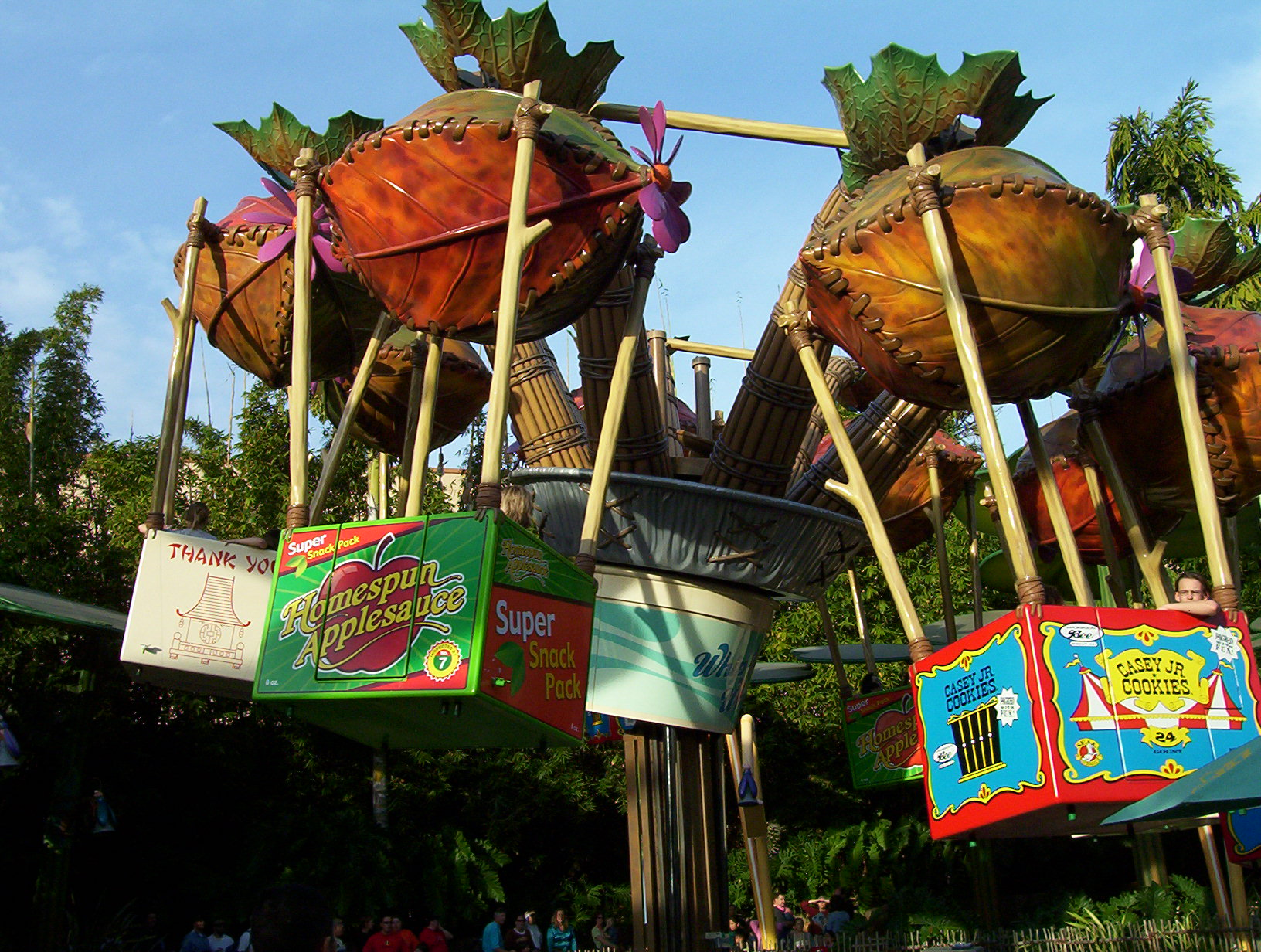
Flik's Flyers as it appeared in A Bug's Land

A Bug's Land (stylized "a bug's land") was inspired by Pixar's 1998 film A Bug's Life, where oversized human items were scattered throughout. It featured Flik's Fun Fair (a collection of themed, family and child-friendly attractions such as Flik's Flyers, Francis' Ladybug Boogie, Tuck & Roll's Drive 'em Buggies, Heimlich's Chew Chew Train, and Dot's Puddle Park). It opened as the park's first expansion in 2002 to expand the park's family-friendly attractions. The land was built around the existing attraction It's Tough to Be a Bug!, a 3D film based on A Bug's Life, which opened with the park in 2001.

It's Tough to Be a Bug! closed on March 19, 2018. The rest of A Bug's Land closed on September 4, 2018, to make way for Avengers Campus. When A Bug's Land closed in 2018, Flik's Flyers was re-themed into Inside Out Emotional Whirlwind, inspired by Pixar's 2015 film Inside Out, and relocated to Pixar Pier.

=== Pacific Wharf ===
Located between Cars Land and Pixar Pier, Pacific Wharf was themed to resemble the old waterfront of Monterey, California as a tribute to its fishing industry. Its attractions were The Bakery Tour and the Walt Disney Imagineering Blue Sky Cellar. This area was primarily an outdoor food court.

In September 2022, it was announced that Pacific Wharf would be re-themed to San Fransokyo, a combination of San Francisco and Tokyo, as seen in Disney Animation's 2014 film Big Hero 6. In February 2023, it was announced that the name of the re-themed area would be San Fransokyo Square. The area debuted on August 31, 2023.

== Alcohol policy ==
Unlike Disneyland Park (with the exception of Carnation Cafe in Main Street, U.S.A., River Belle Terrace in Frontierland, Club 33, Blue Bayou Restaurant and Café Orleans in New Orleans Square, and Oga's Cantina in Star Wars: Galaxy's Edge), Disney California Adventure serves beer, wine, and cocktails throughout its restaurants, stands, and food kiosks. The park also hosts the Disney California Adventure Food & Wine Festival, an annual event featuring a number of themed kiosks, each featuring food and beverages from a particular aspect of California cuisine.

== Live entertainment ==
Five and Dime is a traveling street show featuring Dime and her five band mates. They can be seen driving through Hollywood Land in their 1920s-style car and perform in Buena Vista Street on a stage in front of the Carthay Circle Restaurant, and World of Color is nighttime water and light show on Paradise Bay. During the holiday season, a holiday version of the show is offered. In addition, many Disney Animation, Pixar, and Marvel Cinematic Universe characters can be found in the park, greeting visitors.

== Annual events ==
- The Lunar New Year Celebration (originally begun as the Happy Lunar New Year Celebration at Disneyland) is a festival first held at Disney California Adventure in 2013. The festival celebrates the Chinese, Vietnamese and Korean cultures, taking place in January and February.
- The Disney California Adventure Food & Wine Festival, inaugurated in 2006, is an annual festival celebrating the cuisine, wine, and beer of California, taking place during spring.
- Oogie Boogie Bash, a separately ticketed after hours Halloween event, began in 2019 and takes place on select nights in September and October. The event is named after the character Oogie Boogie from the 1993 film The Nightmare Before Christmas.
- Disney Festival of Holidays is a festival inspired by cultural traditions, started in 2016 and taking place in winter. The festival celebrates traditions from holidays including Christmas, Navidad, Hanukkah, Diwali, Kwanzaa and Three Kings Day.

== Attendance ==
Year	Attendance	Worldwide Rank
2001	5,000,000	
2002	4,700,000	
2003	5,310,000	
2004	5,600,000	
2005	5,800,000	
2006	5,950,000	13
2007	5,680,000	13
2008	5,566,000	8
2009	6,095,000	11
2010	6,287,000	11
2011	6,341,000	13
2012	7,775,000	11
2013	8,514,000	10
2014	8,769,000	10
2015	9,383,000	11
2016	9,295,000	11
2017	9,574,000	13
2018	9,861,000	12
2019	9,861,000	13
2020	1,919,000^{†}	—N/a^{‡}
2021	4,977,000	—N/a^{‡}
2022	9,000,000	—N/a^{‡}
2023	10,000,000	11
2024	10,050,000	
2025	10,090,000	11

Notes
^† Due to the COVID-19 pandemic, the park was only open in 2020 from the beginning of the year through March 14
^‡ Due to the worldwide impacts on park attendance caused by the COVID-19 pandemic, no rankings were done for the year.

== See also ==
- List of Disney theme park attractions
- List of Disney attractions that were never built
- List of incidents at Disneyland Resort
- Disney Adventure World, the second theme park of Disneyland Paris
- Rail transport in Walt Disney Parks and Resorts
- List of amusement parks

=== Disney California Adventure attractions ===
- List of Disney California Adventure attractions
- List of former Disney California Adventure attractions
