= Paul B. Henze =

US intelligence officer, writer (1924–2011)

- Born: Paul Bernard Henze; August 29, 1924; Redwood Falls, Minnesota
- Died: May 19, 2011 (aged 86); Culpeper, Virginia
- Occupation: Central Intelligence Agency station chief in Ethiopia

Paul Bernard Henze (29 August 1924, Redwood Falls – 19 May 2011, Culpeper) was a writer, Central Intelligence Agency operative and American broadcaster with Radio Free Europe. Henze was the CIA station chief for Ethiopia and Turkey during the 1960s and 1970s.

Henze graduated from St. Olaf College and Harvard University. During the Carter Administration he served as a deputy to National Security Advisor Zbigniew Brzezinski. He was encouraged Zbigniew Brzezinski in the formation of the Nationalities Working Group in 1978, of which Henze was appointed head. Influenced by his friend Alexandre Bennigsen, this group advocated the promotion of Islamism as a tool for undermining Soviet hegemony in Central Asia.

Henze wrote The Plot to Kill the Pope in which advocated the view that the Soviet Union was involved in an assassination attempt on John Paul II in 1981.

== Works ==
Henze has published 156 works, including:

- Layers of Time: A History of Ethiopia (35 editions, 1999–2004) ISBN 1137117869
- The Plot to Kill the Pope (18 editions, 1983–1985) ISBN 068418060X
- The Horn of Africa: From War to Peace (18 editions, 1991–2016) ISBN 9781349214563

== Personal life ==
Henze died on May 19, 2011 (aged 86) in Culpeper, Virginia due to complications from a stroke.
