= Grizzly Peak Airfield =

Themed land at Disney California Adventure

Grizzly Peak
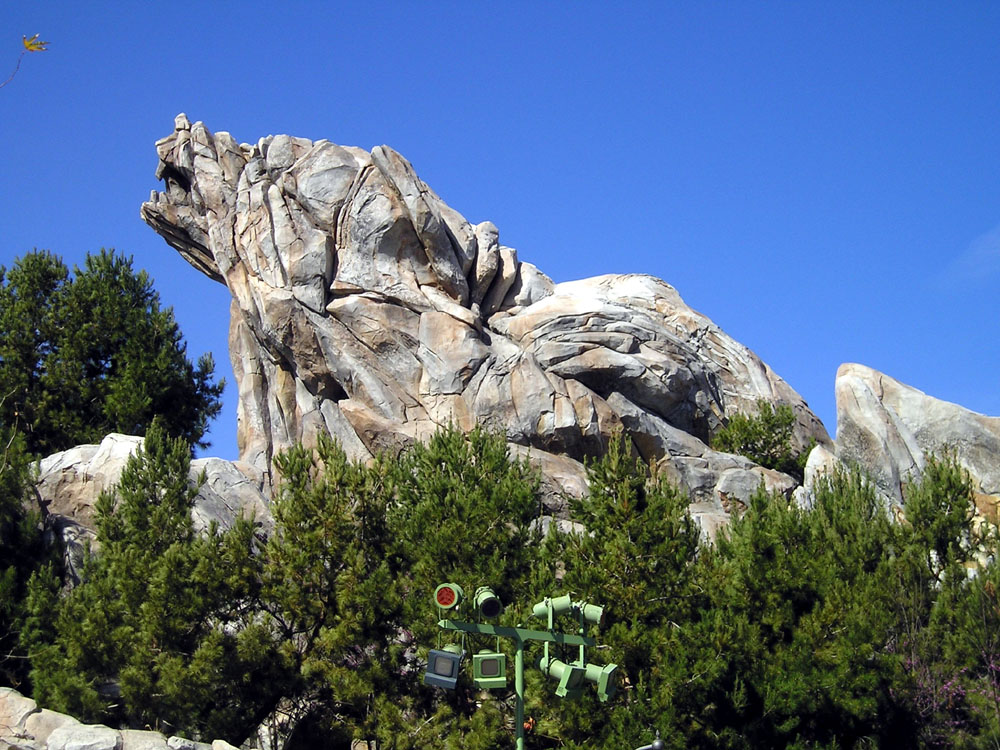
- Grizzly Peak, the land's namesake icon
- Interactive map of Grizzly Peak
- Theme: 1950s National Recreation Area

Attractions
- Total: 3
- Water rides: 1
- Other rides: 1

Disney California Adventure
- Coordinates: 33.80712°N 117.91996°W
- Status: Operating
- Opened: February 8, 2001

Grizzly Peak is a themed land at Disney California Adventure Park at the Disneyland Resort in Anaheim, California. The area is designed to look like the typical Californian National Park setting found in the 1950s. The land, originally named Grizzly Peak Recreation Area, opened with the park in 2001 as part of a subsection of a larger land, Golden State, which also included two other neighboring lands, Pacific Wharf (which closed in 2023 to make way for San Fransokyo Square) and Condor Flats. The "Golden State" name was retired and the three sections were broken off into their own separate lands in 2012, as part of the park's redesign. The Condor Flats section was subsequently incorporated into the Grizzly Peak area, as Grizzly Peak Airfield, in 2015.

The land's name is eponymous with its central icon, Grizzly Peak.

== Attractions ==
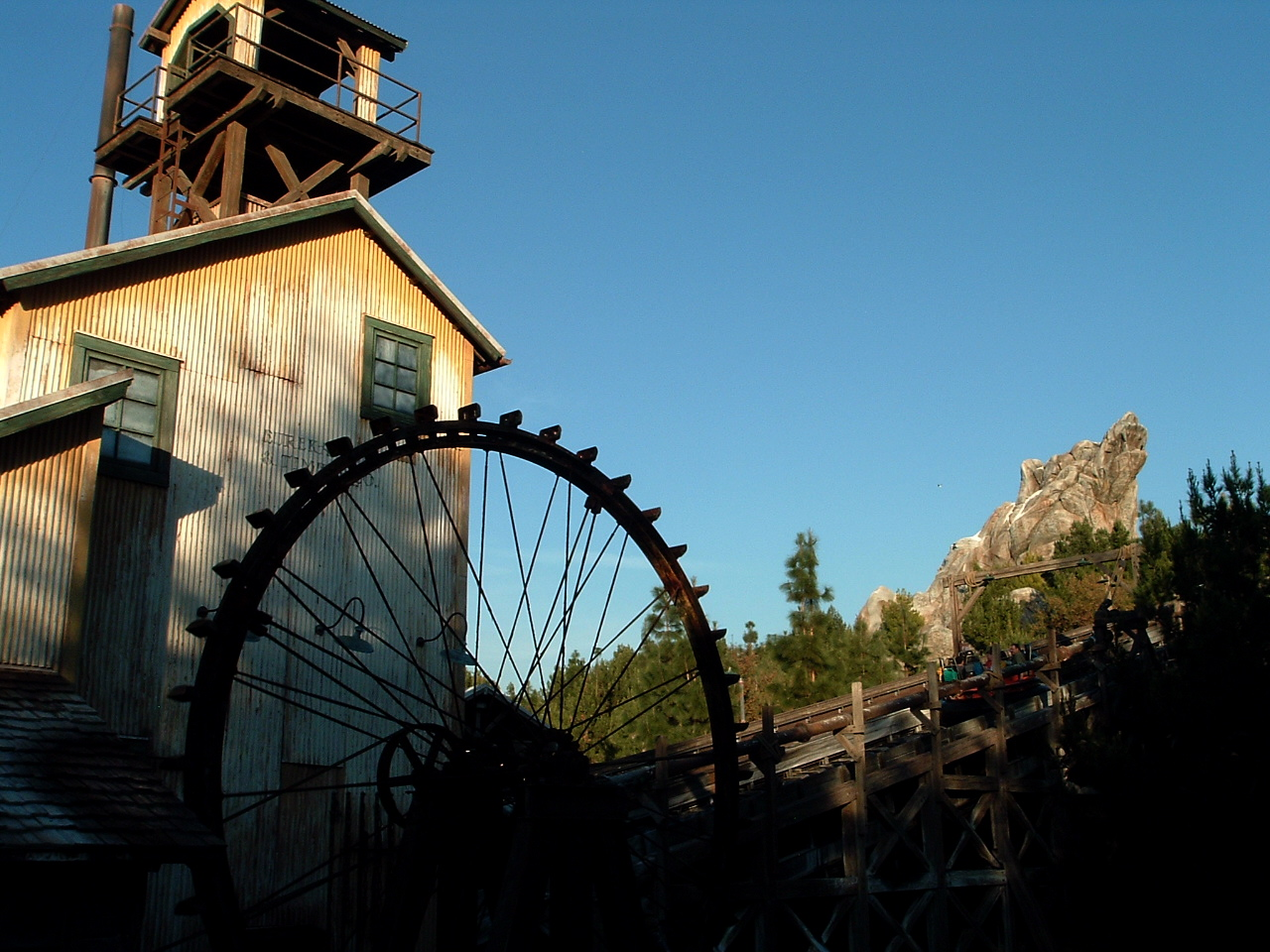
Grizzly River Run in 2009.

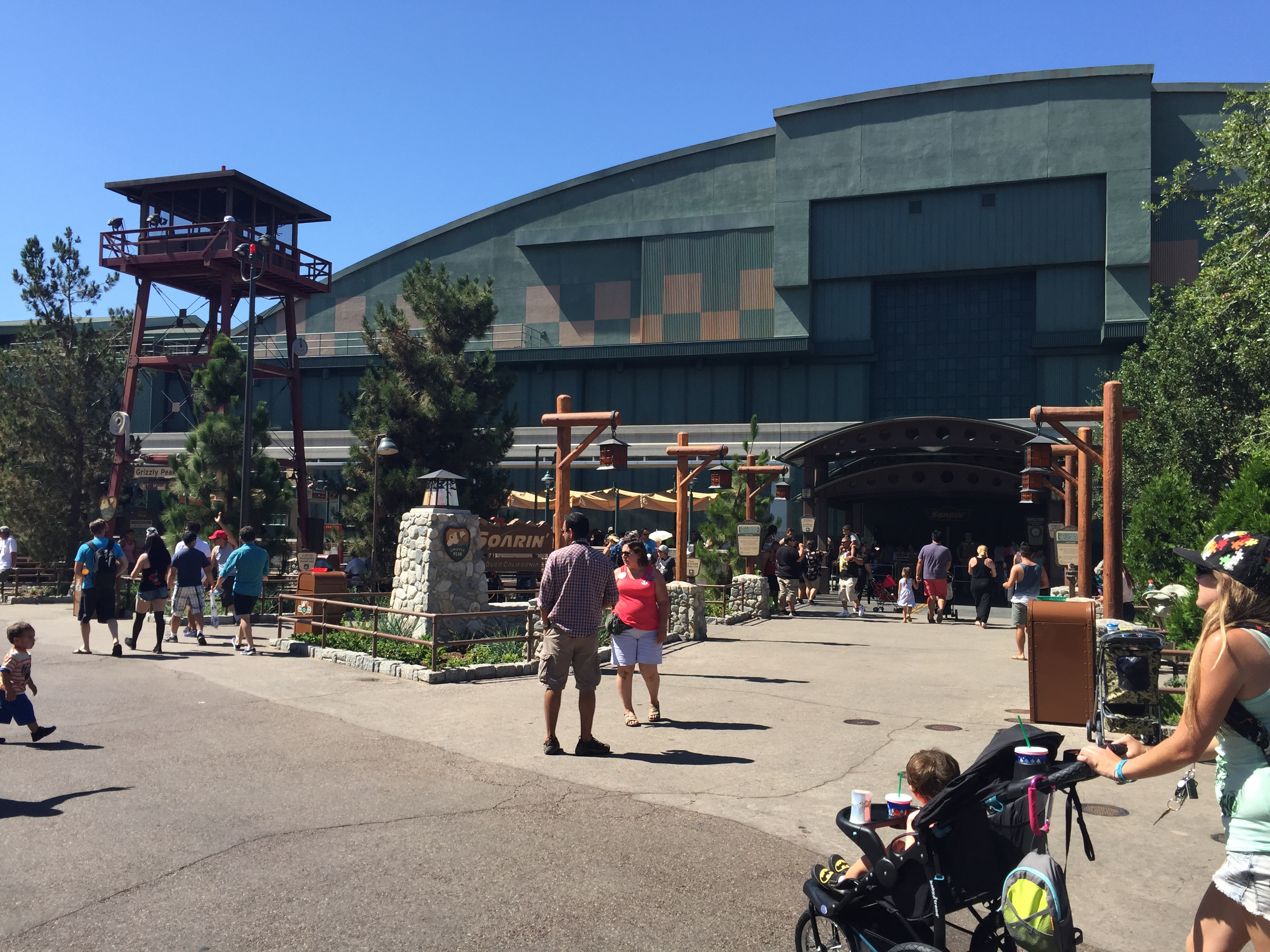
Soarin' in Grizzly Peak Airfield. Photo from July 17th, 2015.

- Grizzly River Run
- Redwood Creek Challenge Trail
- Soarin' Across America

=== Former attractions ===
- The Magic of Brother Bear show
- Push the Talking Trash Can

=== Restaurants ===
- Smokejumpers Grill

=== Shopping ===
- Rushin' River Outfitters
- Humphrey's Service & Supplies
