= Disney California Adventure Food & Wine Festival =

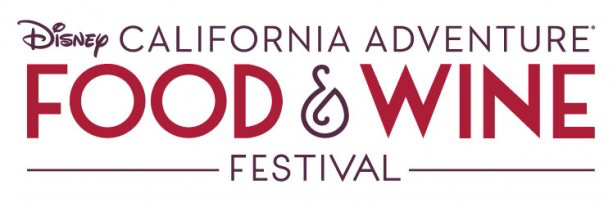
- Status: active
- Genre: Food and drink festival
- Frequency: Annually
- Venue: Disney California Adventure
- Location: Anaheim, California
- Country: United States
- Years active: 2006–2010, 2016–2020, 2022–
- Inaugurated: 2006
- Major events: Wine, Food Tasting, Social Events

The Disney California Adventure Food & Wine Festival is a food and drink festival that takes place each spring in Disney California Adventure in the Disneyland Resort in Anaheim, California. The festival includes a number of themed kiosks, each featuring food and beverages from a particular aspect of California cuisine. Other offerings include wine and beer tastings, seminars, and cooking demonstrations. This event was inspired by the similar but much larger Epcot International Food & Wine Festival.

== History ==
The festival has been held annually beginning in 2006, excepting the years 2011-2015 when Disney California Adventure underwent a period of major construction and 2021 amid the COVID-19 pandemic induced closure of the park. The festival was shortened to only two weeks in 2020, also as a result of the pandemic.

=== 2006 ===
The inaugural event featured two food service locations, the Bountiful Valley Farmers Market and Lucky Fortune Cookery, with 12 food offerings, each offering wine pairings and beer samples. The Golden Vine Winery patio hosted culinary demonstrations, wine, beer, and spirits seminars, guest sommelier education, a wine shop, and event merchandise shop.

=== 2010 ===
The 2010 event ran daily from April 16, 2010 through May 31, 2010 with the theme "The Art of Flavor". The 2010 edition featured the Taste of California Marketplace with ten food offerings and wine and beer seminars at the Festival Showplace, located in the Hollywood Pictures Backlot section of the park. Chef demonstrations took place at the Chef's Showcase Stage, situated in Sunshine Plaza. Exclusive dinners, wine tastings and cooking school sessions could be attended at an additional cost.

=== 2011 to 2015 ===
The festival was not held due to park construction projects and the Diamond jubilee taking place in 2015.

=== 2016 ===
The revamped 2016 edition of the festival ran from April 1, 2016 through May 1, 2016 on weekends and featured eight Festival Marketplace kiosks situated along the Disney California Adventure parade route. The eight themed booths served dozens of selections of California-inspired cuisine included By the Bay, The Brewhouse, The Farm, Gold Rush, LAstyle, The Vineyard, ¡Viva Fresca!, and Wine Country. Beverage seminars and demonstrations by celebrity chefs could again be attended for an additional cost.

=== 2017 ===
The festival became a daily event in 2017 and ran from March 2, 2018 through April 12, 2018. The newly expanded and revamped lineup of fifteen themed booths included Nuts About Cheese, Uncork California, I Heart Artichokes, Garlic Kissed, Olive Us, Bacon Twist, Lemon Grove, Seafood ... Sustained, Onion Lair, Off the Cob, Sweet and Sourdough, LAstyle, Wineology, The Brewhouse and Paradise Garden Grill Beer Garden. The seminars and cooking demonstrations were again presented.

=== 2018 ===
For the 2018 spring season, the festival again ran daily from March 2, 2018 through April 12, 2018. The now sixteen themed booths added Citrus Grove, California Craft Brews, Peppers Cali-Ente, Strawberry Patch, Avocado Time, Cluck-A-Doodle-Moo and Eat Your Greens booths, while Olive Us, Bacon Twist, Lemon Grove, Seafood . . . Sustained, Onion Lair and Wineology were dropped.

=== 2019 ===
In 2019, the California Adventure Food and Wine Festival started on March 1, 2019 and ended on April 23, 2019. The new festival locations were Berry Patch, Veggie, Veggie, Fruit, Fruit and Golden Dreams. Citrus Grove, Strawberry Patch, and Eat Your Greens were omitted. The customary seminars and demonstrations were continued from previous festivals.

=== 2020 ===
The 2020 California Adventure Food and Wine Festival began on February 28, 2020 and was scheduled to run until April 21, 2020. The kiosk lineup remained largely the same, adding only One in a Melon and discontinuing Veggie, Veggie, Fruit, Fruit. A new festival feature was the return of the original ride film of Soarin' Over California to the Soarin' attraction. However, on March 14, 2020 the festival ended early, caused by the closure of the park as a result of the COVID-19 pandemic.

=== 2021 ===
The festival was cancelled for the 2021 spring season due to the closure of the park, caused by the COVID-19 pandemic.

=== 2022 ===
After the COVID pandemic hiatus of 2020-2021, the park revived the California Adventure Food and Wine Festival for the spring 2022 season, beginning on March 4, 2022 and running until April 26, 2022. The lineup of booths was reduced by one, with One in a Melon being dropped from the roster. The remaining booths were unchanged. The festival again featured culinary demonstrations, winemaker receptions and seminars and live entertainment and the return of the Soarin' Over California attraction.

=== 2023 ===
The 2023 festival began on March 3, 2023 and ended on April 25, 2023, as part of the Disney 100 Years of Wonder celebration. The food kiosks, live entertainment, food and drink demonstrations, seminars and Soarin' Over California attraction had all returned from the year prior. The booth lineup was unchanged from 2022.

=== 2024 ===
In 2024, the festival ran from March 1 until April 22, and once again featured the Soarin' Over California ride film. Winemaker receptions and food and beverage seminars are being offered. The kiosk count has been reduced from 12 to 10. An Earth Eats booth featuring vegetarian dishes has been added, and Avocado Time, Berry Patch and I Heart Artichokes have been dropped from the lineup.

=== 2025 ===
In 2025, the Disney California Adventure Food & Wine Festival ran from February 28, 2025 through April 21, 2025, and presented the Soarin' Over California ride film on the Soarin' attraction. The eight food and drink kiosks omitted Earth Eats, D-Lish and Nuts About Cheese from the previous edition of the festival and added a new booth, Mercado de Antojos to the lineup. The live entertainment, food and wine receptions and seminars were again presented.

=== 2026 ===
In 2026, the Disney California Adventure Food & Wine Festival ran from March 6 to April 27, 2026, and presented the Soarin' Over California ride film on the Soarin' attraction, as part of Disneyland Resort's 70th anniversary celebration and Disney California Adventure's 25th anniversary celebration.

== See also ==
- Epcot International Food & Wine Festival
