= Woodburn (surname) =

Woodburn is a surname. Notable people with the surname include:

- Alex Woodburn, English rugby union player
- Arthur Woodburn (1890–1978), Scottish politician; MP, government minister, and Secretary of State for Scotland
- Ben Woodburn (born 1999), Welsh football player
- Charles Woodburn (born 1971), British businessman
- Danny Woodburn (born 1964), American actor
- Jimmy Woodburn (1917–1978), Scottish football player
- Kim Woodburn (1942–2025), English television personality and expert cleaner
- William Woodburn (1838–1915), American politician from Nevada; U.S. representative 1875–89
- Willie Woodburn (1919–2001), Scottish football player
