= Redwood Creek =

Redwood Creek may refer to the following streams in California, United States:

- Redwood Creek (Contra Costa County)
- Redwood Creek (Humboldt County)
- Redwood Creek (Marin County)
- Redwood Creek (San Mateo County)

== See also ==
- Pfeiffer-Redwood Creek, tributary of the Big Sur River
- Redwood Creek Challenge Trail, at Disney California Adventure
