= Redwood Middle School =

Redwood Middle School can refer to the following:

- Redwood Middle School (Thousand Oaks, California)
- Redwood Middle School (Saratoga, California)
- Redwood Middle School (Napa, California)
