= Indian redwood =

Indian redwood is a common name for several plants and may refer to:

- Biancaea sappan, or sappanwood or Indian redwood, a tree in the family Fabaceae
- Chukrasia tabularis, or Indian mahogany, a deciduous, tropical forest tree in the family Meliaceae
