= Alex Woodburn =

English rugby union player (born 1992)

- Born: 2 May 1992 (age 34) Bristol, England
- Height: 1.77 m (5 ft 10 in)
- Weight: 90 kg (14 st 2 lb; 198 lb)

Rugby union career
- Position: Flanker
- Current team: USRC Tigers RFC
Senior career
Years	Team	Apps	(Points)
- Gloucester Rugby

Alex Woodburn is an English professional rugby union player who plays for USRC Tigers RFC. He is currently dual-registered with Hartpury College R.F.C.
