= Redwood Creek Challenge Trail =

Play area at Disney California Adventure

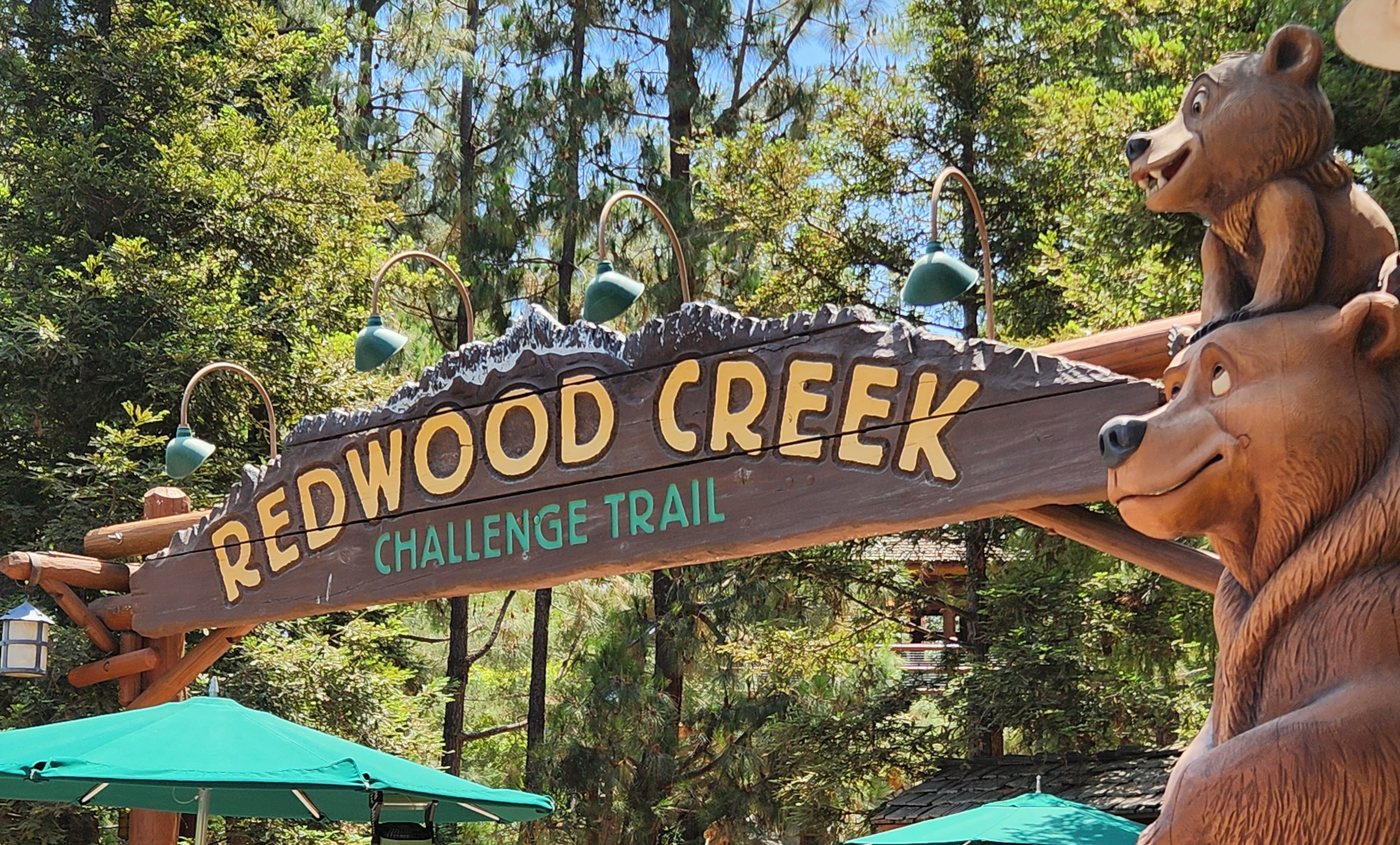
- The attraction entrance, which includes a statue of Kenai and Koda from Brother Bear

Disney California Adventure
- Area: Grizzly Peak
- Status: Operating
- Opening date: February 8, 2001

Ride statistics
- Attraction type: Playground
- Designer: Walt Disney Imagineering
- Theme: Northern California forest parks
- Wheelchair accessible

The Redwood Creek Challenge Trail is a forest-themed play area at Disney California Adventure. It features a network of trails simulating a trail in a redwood forest, a large network of stairs and rope bridges, a traverse rock climbing wall, a zip line, side-by-side slides, and an amphitheater. Explorers can also visit the "Kenai's Spirit Cave" to find what spirit animal represents them (bear, wolf, eagle, moose, salmon, and skunk).

The area was one of the park's original attractions, and opened to the public on February 8, 2001. It was later re-themed after Disney Animation's 2003 film Brother Bear and featured character meeting areas for characters from the film as well as an amphitheater show called The Magic of Brother Bear. It later received theming from Pixar's 2009 film Up, and centered on the Wilderness Explorers, a fictional scouting organization from the film. In March 2026, the attraction received theming from Pixar's 2026 film Hoppers, as a promotional tie-in for the film's release.
