= Redwood High School =

Redwood High School may refer to:

- Redwood High School (Larkspur, California)
- Redwood High School (Visalia, California)
- Redwood Continuation High School, Sequoia Union High School District, Redwood City
- Redwood Alternative High School, Castro Valley

== See also ==
- College of the Redwoods
