= Carnation Cafe =

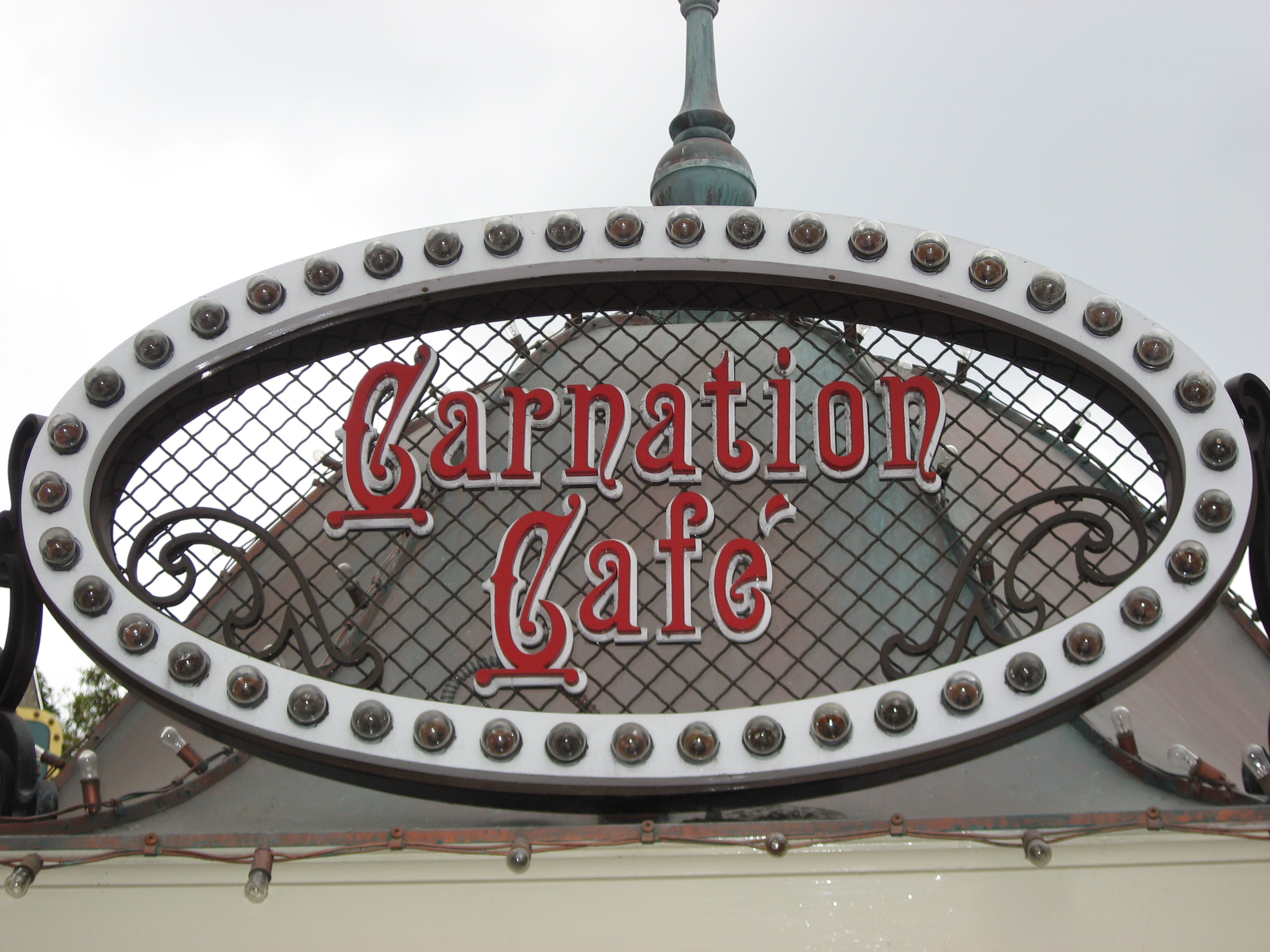

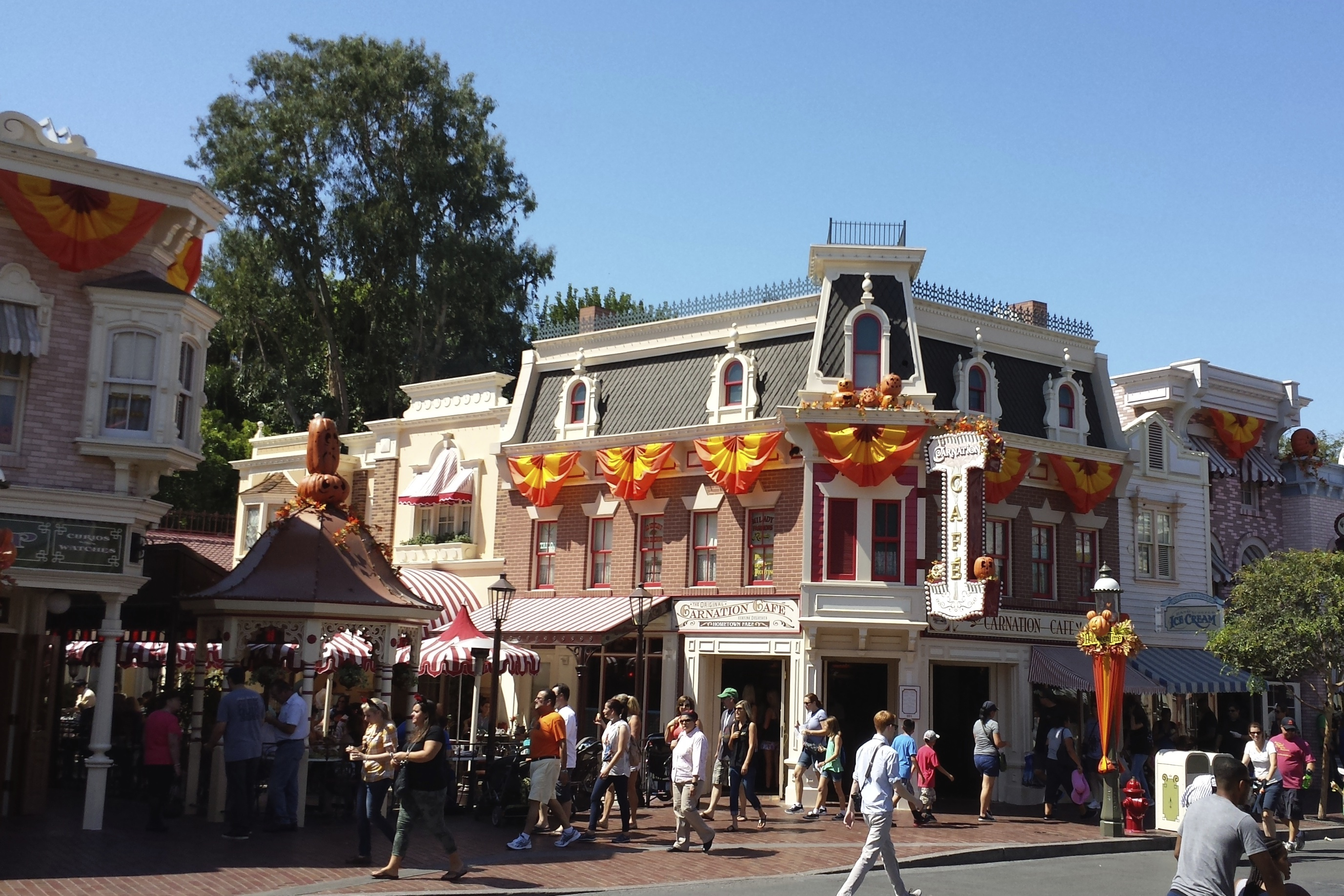

- Location in Anaheim

Restaurant information
- Established: July 17, 1955
- Food type: American food Comfort food
- Location: Disneyland, Anaheim, Orange County, California, 92802, United States
- Coordinates: 33°48′39.8″N 117°55′08.7″W
- Reservations: Recommended
- Website: disneyland.disney.go.com/dining/disneyland/carnation-cafe/

Carnation Cafe is an American comfort food restaurant located in Main Street, U.S.A. at Disneyland in Anaheim, California in the United States. The restaurant opened in 1955 as Carnation Cafe Ice Cream Parlor.

== History ==
Carnation Cafe Ice Cream Parlor opened on July 17, 1955. Sponsored by Carnation, the focus of the establishment was an ice cream counter, where guests ate ice cream on stools. Guests could also eat their ice cream outside on a patio. In 1977, the restaurant expanded into West Center Street, adding more outdoor seating. The Carnation Cafe Ice Cream Parlor closed in January 1997, and in March 1997, it reopened with only outdoor seating as the Carnation Cafe. Nestlé, the owner of the Carnation brand, pulled out as a sponsor of the restaurant, but allowed Disneyland to keep the name. The former ice cream parlor became Blue Ribbon Bakery, which closed upon the opening of Jolly Holiday Bakery Café. In 2012, the Carnation Cafe took back over the space, providing indoor seating for guests.

Oscar Martinez served as chef of Carnation Cafe from 1967 until 2017. He was the longest-serving employee at Disneyland. His dish "Oscar's Choice" remains on the menu.

== Design ==
The restaurant, housed in a two-story Victorian-style building, offers both indoor and outdoor dining. The patio is covered and offers views of Main Street, U.S.A., including views of the parades that pass by.

A carnation flower is placed on every table.

== Cuisine ==
Carnation Cafe serves American-style comfort food, including dishes that were favorites of Walt Disney, including Walt's Chili, which was the same recipe he used to enjoy when he was alive. The chili is described by Time Out Los Angeles "straightforward, meaty, tomato heavy classic that comes topped with cheese, sour cream, and chopped fresh tomatoes."

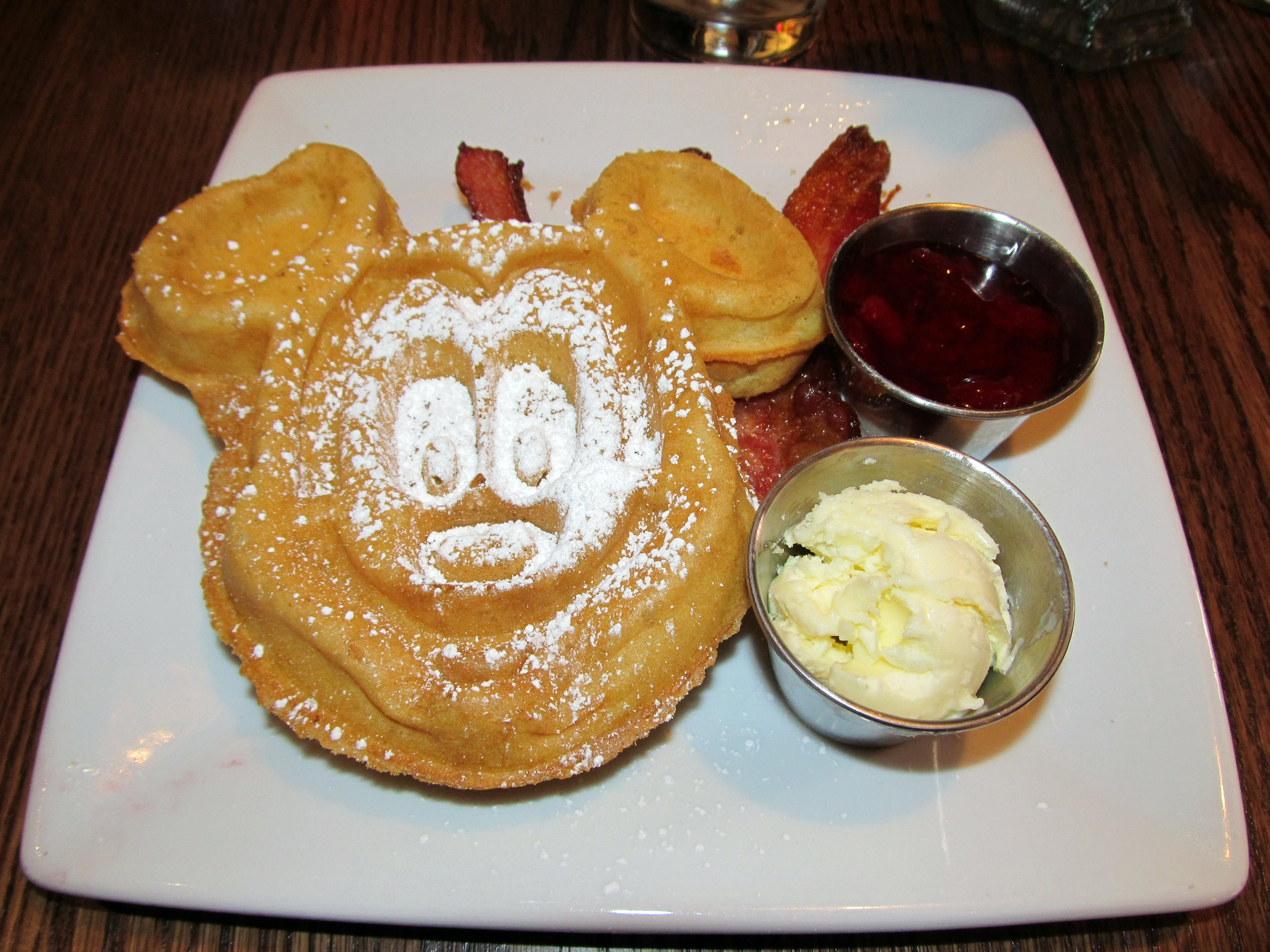
A vegan Mickey Mouse shaped waffle at Carnation Cafe.

Carnation Cafe offers breakfast, which includes vegan Mickey Mouse shaped waffles and pancakes. The waffles were given an honorable mention as one of the best dishes in Disneyland by Los Angeles Magazine in 2017.

Appetizers include fried dill pickle spears, dipped in parmesan cheese and panko breadcrumbs served with ranch dressing. Eater named the fried pickles as one of the top "things to eat" at Disneyland in 2019.

Entrees include Chicken-fried Chicken with buttermilk fried chicken, mashed potatoes, country gravy and vegetables and Homemade Meatloaf, a blend of pork and beef, served with a ketchup glaze, mashed potatoes, mushroom gravy and vegetables. Carnation Cafe also offers sandwiches.

The restaurant offers special seasonal food during the holidays. For Christmas 2019, the menu included a Fried Bologna Sandwich and a Pork Chop TV Dinner, the latter served in a classic TV dinner tray with seasoned apples, mashed potatoes, peas and carrots, and a cheddar and chive scone with bread pudding.

== Reception ==
In 2019, Time Out Los Angeles named Walt's Chili as the 27th best food item at Disneyland. SFGate says Carnation Cafe serves "consistently quality food." Inside the Magic named Carnation Cafe one of the "Most romantic dining spots at Disneyland Resort."
