= Redwood Falls Township, Redwood County, Minnesota =

Redwood Falls Township, Minnesota
- Township
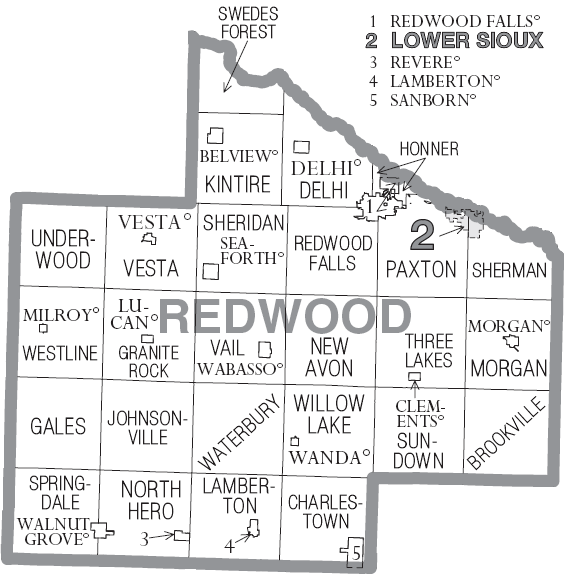
- Cities and townships of Redwood County
- Coordinates: 44°30′13″N 95°9′31″W
- Country: United States
- State: Minnesota
- County: Redwood

Area
  - Total: 34.4 sq mi (89.0 km^{2})
  - Land: 34.3 sq mi (88.8 km^{2})
  - Water: 0.077 sq mi (0.2 km^{2})
- Elevation: 1,053 ft (321 m)

Population (2000)
  - Total: 256
  - Density: 7.5/sq mi (2.9/km^{2})
- Time zone: UTC-6 (Central (CST))
  - Summer (DST): UTC-5 (CDT)
- ZIP code: 56283
- Area code: 507
- FIPS code: 27-53674
- GNIS feature ID: 0665391

Redwood Falls Township is one of the twenty-six townships of Redwood County, Minnesota, United States. The population was 256 at the 2000 census.

Redwood Falls Township was organized in 1880.

== Geography ==
According to the United States Census Bureau, the township has a total area of 34.4 square miles (89.0 km^{2}), of which 34.3 square miles (88.8 km^{2}) is land and 0.1 square mile (0.2 km^{2}) (0.26%) is water.

A small portion of the city of Redwood Falls is located in Redwood Falls Township.

== Demographics ==
As of the census of 2000, there were 256 people, 89 households, and 72 families residing in the township. The population density was 7.5 people per square mile (2.9/km^{2}). There were 93 housing units at an average density of 2.7/sq mi (1.0/km^{2}). The racial makeup of the township was 98.44% White, 0.39% Native American and 1.17% Asian.

There were 89 households, out of which 37.1% had children under the age of 18 living with them, 69.7% were married couples living together, 1.1% had a female householder with no husband present, and 19.1% were non-families. 15.7% of all households were made up of individuals, and 5.6% had someone living alone who was 65 years of age or older. The average household size was 2.88 and the average family size was 3.22.

In the township the population was spread out, with 29.3% under the age of 18, 7.0% from 18 to 24, 26.6% from 25 to 44, 26.6% from 45 to 64, and 10.5% who were 65 years of age or older. The median age was 37 years. For every 100 females, there were 128.6 males. For every 100 females age 18 and over, there were 132.1 males.

The median income for a household in the township was $52,500, and the median income for a family was $59,375. Males had a median income of $32,344 versus $30,357 for females. The per capita income for the township was $20,223. About 4.0% of families and 4.3% of the population were below the poverty line, including 8.0% of those under the age of eighteen and none of those 65 or over.
