= Disney's LuminAria =

Disney California Adventure
- Area: Paradise Pier
- Status: Removed
- Opening date: November 9, 2001
- Closing date: January 6, 2002
- Replaced by: World of Color (Paradise Gardens Park)

Ride statistics
- Attraction type: Low-level fireworks
- Designer: Walt Disney Creative Entertainment
- Wheelchair accessible

Disney's LuminAria was a 2001–2002 fireworks show on Paradise Bay at Disney California Adventure at the Disneyland Resort in Anaheim, California. The show was short-lived, lasting only one winter season. The show design was similar to IllumiNations: Reflections of Earth at EPCOT focusing the audience towards Paradise Bay while fountains played in various changing patterns and fireworks were discharged in sync with seasonal music.

The finale showed various holiday cards on projection screens, a fiber optic Christmas tree, and white lights around California Screamin' and the Sun Wheel. Each day, young guests were invited to draw their own holiday cards, which were then scanned and appeared in that evening's presentation.

== Show Credits ==
The show was conceived and directed by Steve Davison. The music was arranged, adapted, composed and conducted by Don L. Harper, and the main vocals were performed by Miriam Stockley.

== Soundtrack ==
There was an officially released CD for the soundtrack to Disney's LuminAria. The album is called Holiday Magic. The CD also included two other tracks: one for the holiday-themed version of "It's A Small World" entitled "it's a small world" Holiday, and Believe... In Holiday Magic which was a fireworks show at Disneyland.

=== Track listing ===
1. "Believe... In Holiday Magic" Fireworks Spectacular (13:26)

2. "it's a small world" Holiday (15:10)

3. Disney's LuminAria (16:26)

=== Production ===
Album Compiled by: Randy Thornton

Production Assistant: Sarah Harris

Album Art Direction: Jordan Foley

Barcode: 050086006076

ISBN 0-7634-1863-3

== See also ==
- Disney's World of Color
