= Lamplight Lounge =

Restaurant at Disney's California Adventure

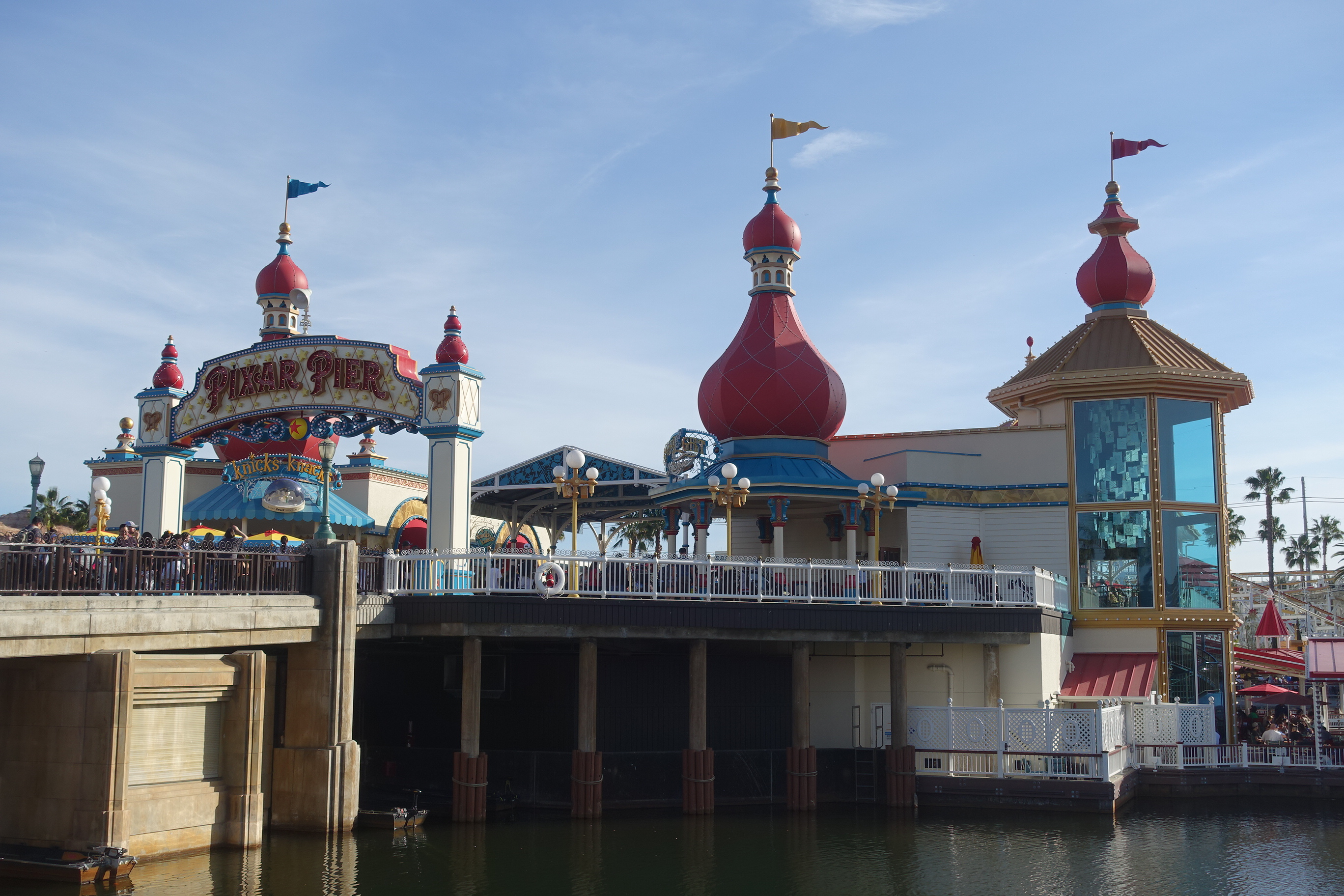
- Interactive map of Lamplight Lounge

Restaurant information
- Established: February 8, 2001 (as Avalon Cove); December 20, 2002 (as Ariel's Grotto); June 23, 2018 (as Lamplight Lounge)
- Location: Anaheim, Orange County, California, United States
- Coordinates: 33°48′19″N 117°55′16″W

Lamplight Lounge (formerly known as Ariel's Grotto and Avalon Cove) is a restaurant located within the Pixar Pier area of Disney California Adventure, part of the Disneyland Resort in Anaheim, California, United States.

== Overview ==
Lamplight Lounge carries the fictional backstory of being a former warehouse that was refurbished into a venue for working animators. It is named after the character of Luxo Jr., who is Pixar's mascot. Theming throughout the restaurant references different Pixar films.

The two-story restaurant is located by the bridge at Pixar Pier. Guests travel down a staircase and into the dining area, which contains a large outdoor balcony next to the bay with views of Pixar Pier. The menu is mostly changed from the previous restaurant occupying the building, Ariel's Grotto. A kids menu known as Budding Artists is also available.

The restaurant contains a secret dining room known as The Office, located just outside the main dining area. A code is required to enter it and the room can fit groups of around ten people. The private room contains board games on the wall that can be taken down and played by those there. A small patio is accessible outside it.

== History ==
Lamplight Lounge originally opened with the rest of Disney California Adventure on February 8, 2001, under the name Avalon Cove. At the time, the restaurant was managed by celebrity chef Wolfgang Puck. The 350-seat seafood restaurant was made to resemble a sandcastle from the exterior and was among the most expensive restaurants in the park. However, the restaurant closed at the end of September the same year.

With Wolfgang Puck no longer in ownership of Avalon Cove, Disney decided to open in its place a restaurant more catered to families. After reopening, food became more American and Disney characters were added to the experience. The restaurant eventually rebranded to Ariel's Grotto, which opened on December 20, 2002. During this time, the restaurant was a character dining experience themed after The Little Mermaid. The venue also contained the Cove Bar.

In late 2017, Disney announced that the Paradise Pier section of the park, where Ariel's Grotto was located, would be rethemed into a new area known as Pixar Pier. The restaurant was shut down alongside the rest of the land the following January to make way for the renovation. The next month, it was revealed the location would be renovated into a Pixar-themed restaurant known as the Lamplight Lounge. It reopened on June 23, 2018, with the new theme.
