= World of Color =

Nighttime show at Disney California Adventure

Disney's World of Color

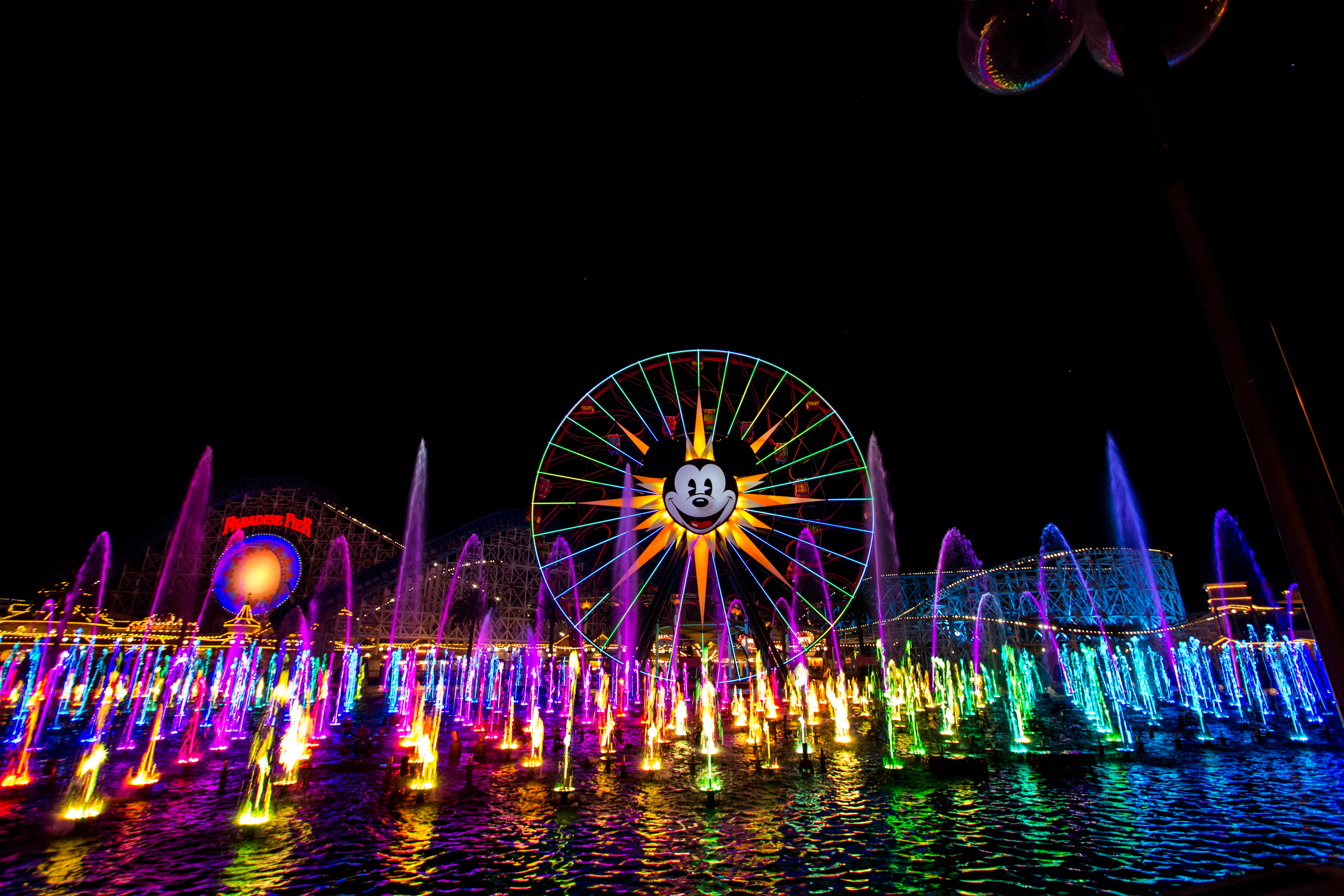
- A view of the show in 2013

Disney California Adventure
- Area: Paradise Pier (2010–2018); Paradise Gardens Park (2018–present)
- Coordinates: 33°48′19.69″N 117°55′17.96″W
- Status: Operating
- Opening date: June 10, 2010
- Replaced: Disney's LuminAria (Paradise Pier)

Ride statistics
- Attraction type: Hydrotechnic show
- Designer: Disney Live Entertainment
- Theme: Disney's animated and live-action films and television series
- Music: Arrangements by Mark Hammond and David Hamilton (Original version); DLS Music (Winter Dreams & Season of Light); John Debney (Celebrate!)
- Duration: 27 minutes (Original version); 21:30 minutes(Celebrate!); 30 minutes (Winter Dreams); 25:10 minutes (Season of Light); 21:06 minutes (Villainous); 23 minutes (ONE)
- Number of fountains: 1,200+

World of Color is a nighttime show at Disney California Adventure in the Disneyland Resort in Anaheim, California. Conceived by Vice President of Parades and Spectaculars Steve Davison, and designed by Disney Live Entertainment, the show has 1,200 water fountains and includes lights, fire, lasers, and fog, with high-definition projections on mist screens. The show is inspired by Walt Disney's Wonderful World of Color anthology television series, as evidenced by the use of its eponymous theme song written by the Sherman Brothers.

The process of assembling, installing, and testing the show's numerous components and equipment in Paradise Bay spanned a period of approximately 15 months. The original version of World of Color premiered at a media-only event on Thursday, June 10, 2010, and to the public on Friday, June 11, 2010, as part of the Summer Nightastic! promotional campaign. The entire show cost $175 million to design, fabricate, and install.

The show transpires at the lagoon of Paradise Bay, while the audience watches the performance at Paradise Park, located in front of The Little Mermaid: Ariel's Undersea Adventure attraction, as well as on the Pixar Pier bridge. Other nearby attractions such Pixar Pal-A-Round and Incredicoaster become part of the performance as they undergo various forms of lighting and projections throughout the show. The effects utilized in World of Color (water fountains, mist screens, fire, lasers, lighting, and fog) are choreographed to work in synchronicity with the featured music and image projections.

On January 27, 2023, a new iteration of the show called World of Color – ONE debuted, which is part of The Walt Disney Company's centennial celebration.

On May 16, 2025, World of Color – ONE was replaced by World of Color Happiness! in honor of the 70th Anniversary of Disneyland.

On June 2, 2026, it was announced that the final performance of World of Color Happiness will be permanently closed on August 9, 2026 and World of Color — ONE will return for a limited time on August 10, 2026, running through the Halloween season.

On August 15, 2026 at D23: The Ultimate Disney Fan Event 2026, it was announced that the updated version of the nighttime shows will return in February 2027, along with the classic fireworks show, Remember... Dreams Come True at Disneyland.

== Construction and development ==
The show's hidden control room backstage

The show was first announced as part of the Disney California Adventure Park expansion in the fall of 2007, originally known as Walt Disney's Wonderful World of Color. Construction for the water show began with the draining of Paradise Bay on November 3, 2008. Construction on the platform began on January 5, 2009. The water was refilled in Paradise Bay in November 2009. Testing began during and after park hours in January 2010. A 25-minute video of sequences from the show was posted on YouTube by a hotel guest staying at Disney's Paradise Pier Hotel, on April 7, 2010. The first public performance was held on June 5, 2010, for the creators of the show and guests. In the week leading up to June 11, private viewings for cast members, contest winners, and a celebrity-filled World Premiere took place.

=== Show elements ===
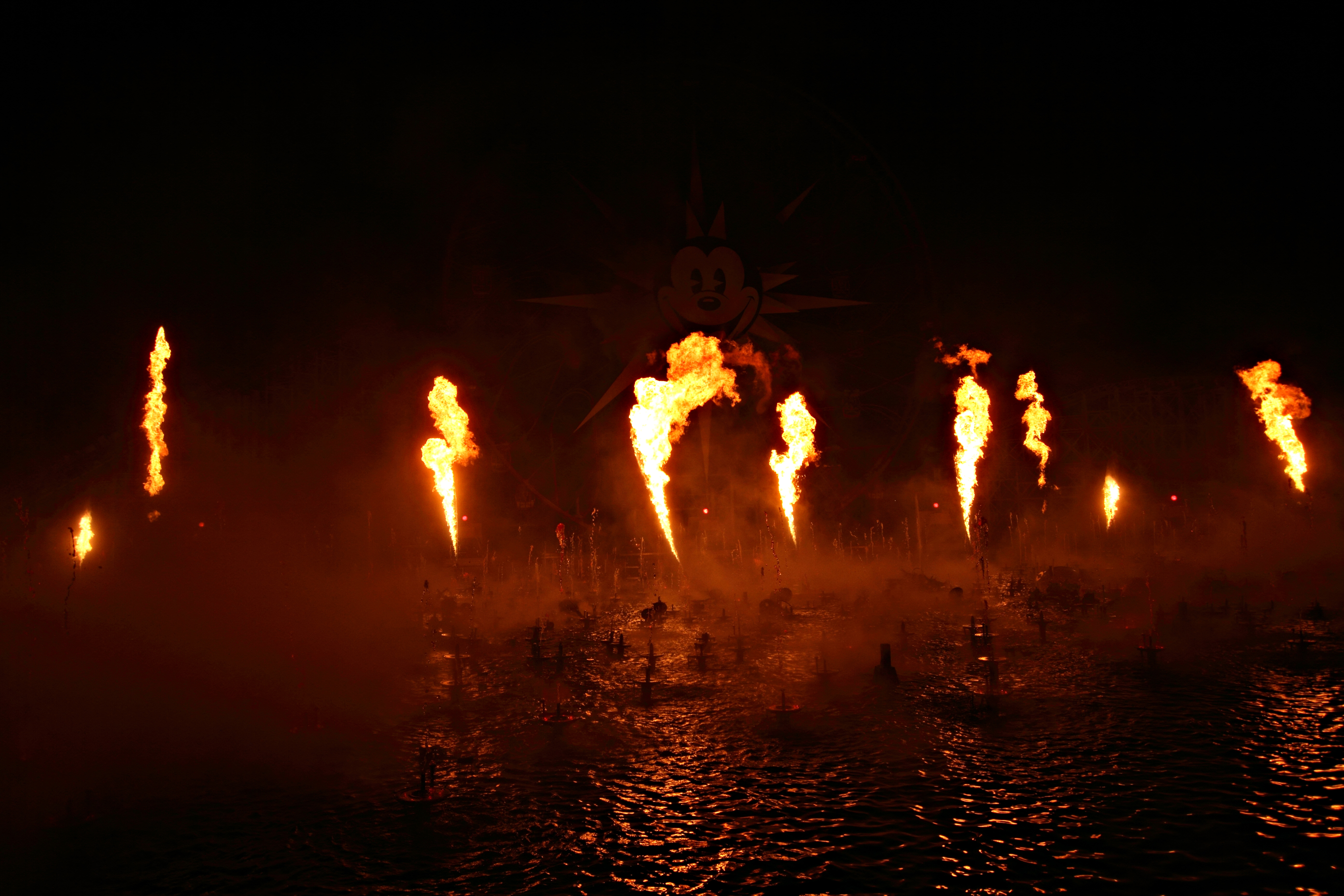
Pyrotechnics are combined with colored water fountains to create the show.

The show uses 1,200 fountains that can shoot water up to 200 ft (61 m) in the air. Each fountain is equipped with an LED ring. Other water features include 3 mist screens that combine to make a 380-foot (120 m)-long mist screen on which images are projected (similar but smaller screens are used in Fantasmic! at Disneyland and Disney's Hollywood Studios at Walt Disney World in Lake Buena Vista, Florida). Isopar cannons are capable of shooting flames up to 50 ft (15 m) in the air. MeeFog and lasers are used. Previously, projection domes emerged from the water atop telescopic masts and featured lighting effects and video projected onto the inside surface of the domes. However, these were later removed due to maintenance and reliability issues. Laser and video projections were previously projected onto the sun icon behind California Screamin's vertical loop, but since it was transformed into Incredicoaster, there no longer seems to be projections in the loop area. A 65' tall telescopic mast was installed in the bay to create Chernabog of Fantasia, but the tower was never used in the show and was eventually removed. The LED lighting strings (Phillips ColorKinetics iColorFlex) on Pixar Pal-A-Round, as well as LED lights installed on Incredicoaster, are synchronized to the show.

Lighting towers rise from boxes in front of the viewing area. The lighting towers bordering the viewing area and the bay include speakers, bubble machines, and a handful of VariLite VL3000 Spot lighting fixtures (which were replaced with Elation Proteus Hybrids in 2021). On either side of the bay, there are additional lighting towers with five Syncrolite SXB-7/3 fixtures (later replaced by VariLite VL6000 Beams). Additional Clay Paky Sharpy fixtures have since been added onto the Incredicoaster, as well as around the Mickey head on the front of the Pixar Pal-A-Round. The viewing area, known as Paradise Park, is situated along the northern shore of Paradise Bay, and can hold up to 4,000 spectators at full capacity. It is multi-tiered, similar to the viewing area for Fantasmic! at Disneyland in Anaheim, California. It features trellises (they were removed for sight line issues), flowers, and formerly - an interactive play fountain during the day. Hidden fountains located in the flower beds in the viewing area are incorporated into show. When World of Color: Celebrate! was opened, a large screen shaped like Mickey's head was added to be raised to cover the face on Pixar Pal-A-Round giving the show another projection surface. On nights where winds are too strong, the screen was not pulled up and some projections seen on the Pixar Pal-A-Round head showed up on the Incredicoaster's loop area instead. This screen no longer seems to be used as of 2022. The fountains in the flower beds in the viewing area were replaced by CO_{2} cannons and additional cannons were placed on the edge of the viewing area on the water. Each cannon has its own LED lighting ring, similar to the fountains. For World of Color: Winter Dreams, a series of foam machines that could create snowflake shaped foam elements were installed in fake gift boxes throughout the viewing area. The show utilizes an on-PC system to control the laser effects, 4 GrandMA2 Full size consoles, 1 GrandMA2 light console and 7 NPUs to control the rest of the show's elements.

From the show's conception, all versions have presented footage from the Walt Disney Studios library, including films from Walt Disney Animation Studios, Pixar Animation Studios, Walt Disney Pictures, Marvel Studios, and Lucasfilm.

== Synopsis ==
=== World of Color ===
Special animation sequences were created using paper animation by paper artist Megan Brain, who created many characters for the show. Mark Hammond and Dave Hamilton arranged the music, which was performed by the London Symphony Orchestra and The Nashville Choir.

The show begins with Dick Wesson's original introduction to Walt Disney's Wonderful World of Color. A quote from Walt Disney appears on the center mist screen; "Every child is blessed with a vivid imagination", and the theme song transforms into the reworked version for World of Color. As the introduction concludes, a projection of Ariel before a sunset, stretches across the mist screens. The show enters The Little Mermaid portion, with Ariel and Sebastian singing "Part of Your World" and "Under the Sea", respectively. On the last note of "Under the Sea", Crush and Squirt from Finding Nemo are seen traveling on the East Australian Current, as the water fountains begin to portray the characteristics of rough surf. As the final breaking wave clears, the scene with Marlin and Dory encountering the blue whale from the film plays out. As the duo attempt to escape, the scene transitions into the "Pines of Rome" segment from Fantasia 2000. The bay gradually transforms into an outer space environment as Eve and WALL-E from WALL-E appear and re-enact their "Define Dancing" scene. WALL-E, equipped with a fire extinguisher, sprays it throughout the lagoon, forming small clouds as a result. The clouds eventually re-create Andy's room from Toy Story, with Woody and Buzz Lightyear appearing shortly thereafter on Andy's bed. Woody rebuffs Buzz's ability to fly, thus Buzz attempts to disprove him and Andy's room is suddenly changed into a battle between Buzz and Emperor Zurg from Toy Story 2.

As the bay clears, Carl Fredrickson's house from Up briefly makes an appearance before the setting transitions into Aladdin. With the night sky recreated on the bay, Aladdin and Jasmine perform "A Whole New World" together, until the Genie abruptly appears and takes control of the show by performing "Friend Like Me". Once the Genie disappears, the Spring Sprite from Fantasia 2000 transforms the bay into a lush forest, where Pocahontas appears, singing "Just Around the Riverbend". The Pocahontas segment ends with a dramatic fountain overlay set to "Farewell" from it.

After a brief pause, Heimlich from A Bug's Life arrives, informing the audience of an approaching thunderstorm. The storm rapidly intensifies into the thunderstorm scene from The Old Mill, accompanied by an unsettling instrumental version of "Little April Showers" from Bambi. As the storm dissipates, Jack Sparrow from Pirates of the Caribbean emerges from the shadows and "Yo Ho (A Pirate's Life for Me)" is faintly heard. Suddenly, the bay turns blood-red as fountains and flames of fire are orchestrated in tandem with "He's a Pirate". Battle scenes from the Pirates of the Caribbean series are projected onto the mist screens before transcending into a sequence dominated by jets of fire.^{[Note 1]} Once the Pirates of the Caribbean act concludes,^{[Note 2]} the atmosphere of the show's narrative darkens and Mufasa's death scene from The Lion King unfolds erratically on the bay.

After a brief moment of silence, the show enters its climax. "So Close" from Enchanted plays as touching scenes from Disney's animated films (including The Lion King, Bambi, Dumbo, Tangled,^{[Note 3]} Lady and the Tramp, The Princess and the Frog and Beauty and the Beast) are projected. The transformation scene from Beauty and the Beast takes place, being followed by other famous moments from Snow White and the Seven Dwarfs, Sleeping Beauty, and Cinderella. Immediately following Cinderella, the fountains and lighting turn white and the lagoon fades into darkness. The fountains then slowly begin to regain momentum as they swirl around the lagoon, until Tinker Bell appears to enchant the bay, which suddenly blossoms into a myriad of colors. Entering the show's finale, a reprisal of "The Wonderful World of Color" is heard as the bay becomes host to a kaleidoscopic montage of films, some of which were earlier components of the show (including Alice in Wonderland, The Little Mermaid, Finding Nemo, WALL-E, Toy Story, Aladdin, Fantasia 2000, Pocahontas, The Old Mill, Pirates of the Caribbean, The Hunchback of Notre Dame, The Lion King, Lilo & Stitch and The Princess and the Frog). Mickey Mouse then appears in his iconic "Sorcerer's Apprentice" attire from Fantasia and the show concludes with a final series of water, fire, laser and light orchestrations.^{[Note 4]}

Notes:

- Note 1. The Pirates of the Caribbean sequence was extended from May 20, 2011, to June 15, 2012, to promote the release of Pirates of the Caribbean: On Stranger Tides.
- Note 2. The original show had a sequence composed of the "Firebird Suite" (from Fantasia 2000), "Night on Bald Mountain" (from Fantasia) and "Hellfire" (from The Hunchback of Notre Dame). It was replaced by the extended Pirates of the Caribbean sequences and has not been restored to the show since 2011. But this has been used in "Villains Night Out!" Halloween mini-parade at Hong Kong Disneyland, as Maleficent morph into a ferocious dragon, determined to claim the castle as her own and invited more villains.
- Note 3. Replaced Tarzan on May 20, 2011.
- Note 4. The finale was followed by an encore promoting the release of Tron: Legacy. It ran from October 29, 2010, to March 23, 2011.

==== Original planned version ====
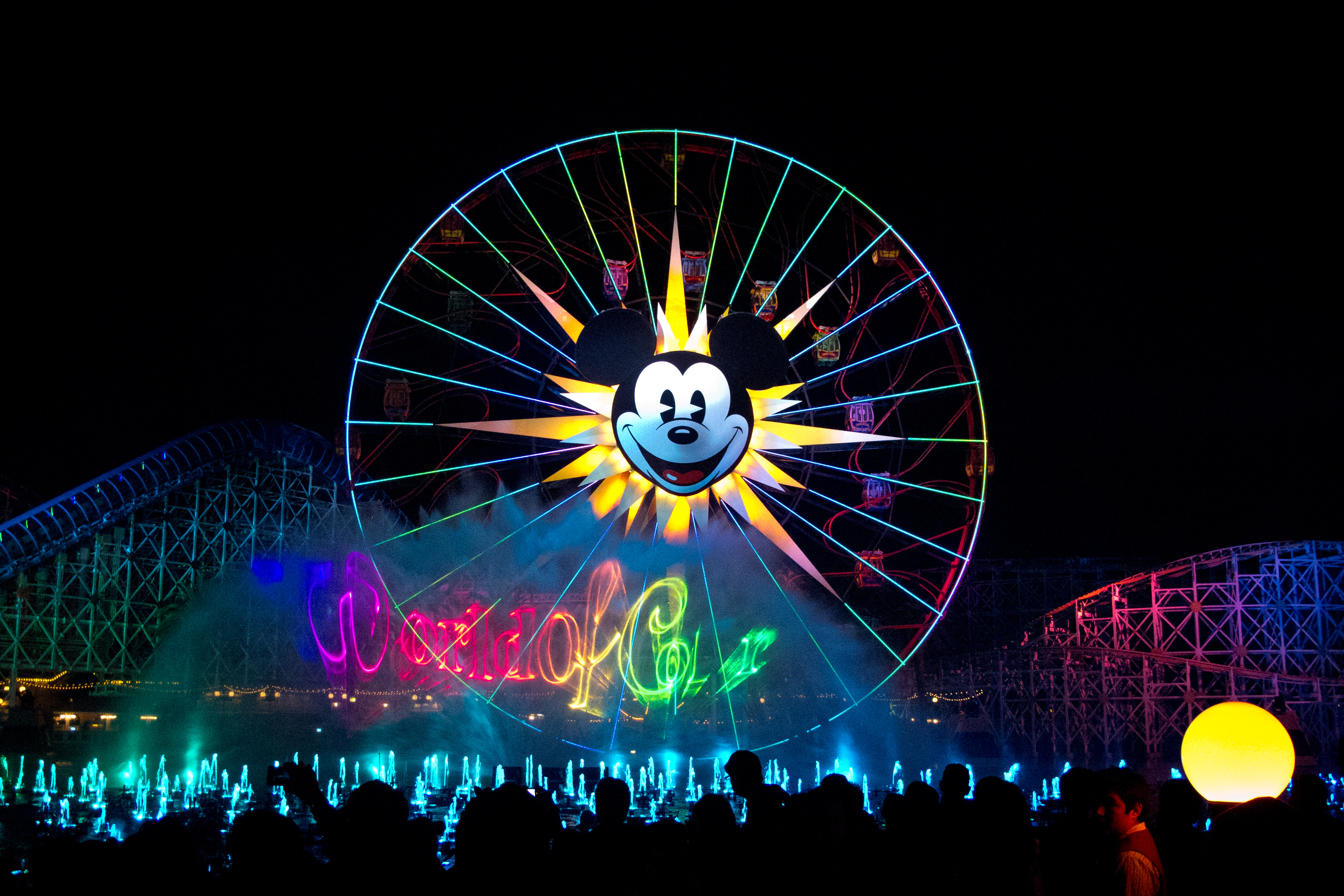
The World of Color logo projected via laser onto a mist screen

Early plans also called for a small orange fountain, named Little Squirt, that was meant to embody Walt Disney's artistic and mischievous spirit, and appear throughout the show. Instead, during the post-show, after all the other fountains turn off, the little orange fountain remains on for a couple seconds as it bows to the audience, then disappears.

A video of a run-through of the show leaked onto the Internet on April 7, 2010. There had been a few changes to the show from the synopsis that had been disclosed for Disney fans in September 2009. Sequences featuring Alice in Wonderland, the Firebird, and Dr. Facilier were missing, the Pocahontas/Heimlich/Little April Showers segment was placed after "A Whole New World," and new Hercules and Pirates of the Caribbean segments had been added. It was also rumored that Disney CEO Bob Iger wanted a more contemporary soundtrack and that the show was being reworked. Many of these changes were confirmed when a second video of a run-through leaked onto the Internet.

Disney launched a website for World of Color containing interactive features, pictures of on-site testing, and videos. The theme song to "World of Color" has also been posted on the Disneyland website. Although videos of testing have been leaked online, the site shows both the extensive Alice in Wonderland and The Princess and the Frog segments of the show that were said to have been cut. The site was launched after leaked videos of testing were posted.

Singer-songwriter Amy Grant was going to provide lead vocals for the show's rendition of "The Wonderful World of Color" but was ultimately replaced in the studio and is not heard in the final version.

==== Temporary scenes and special holiday pre-shows ====
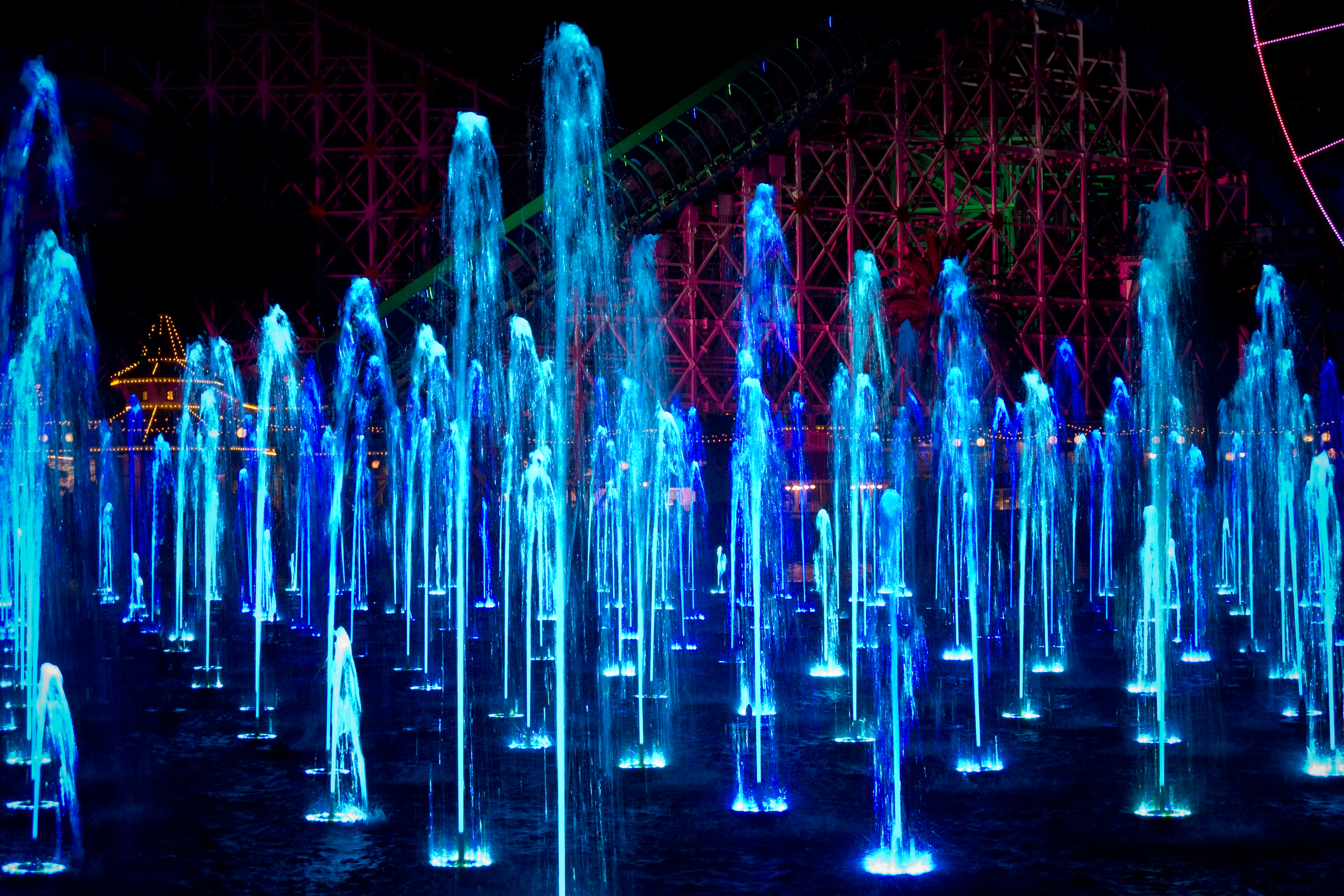
A closeup of the individual fountain nozzles.

On October 29, 2010, previews for an encore scene promoting Tron: Legacy began, using additional projections and effects on the California Screamin' structure along with improved use of Paradise Park and Mickey's Fun Wheel lighting in a reworked trailer sequence. The scene was added to the show on November 1, 2010, and was discontinued in March 2011. On May 20, The Pirates of the Caribbean segment was expanded to include scenes from Pirates of the Caribbean: On Stranger Tides and was discontinued on June 15, 2012, the same day that a sequence incorporating Brave premiered.

Beginning in 2011 for the Fourth of July season, from July 1 to 4, a special Independence Day preshow was added. The Independence Day preshow utilizes fireworks, which the normal show does not use, such as pyro launches from barges on Pixar Pier, atop of the Toy Story Midway Mania show building, and backstage behind California Screamin'. In addition, the patriotic music for the pre-show borrows selections from Disney's Celebrate America, the Fourth of July fireworks show that is presented at the adjacent Disneyland Park and Walt Disney World's Magic Kingdom park.

On November 11, Disney unveiled a holiday themed intro based on Prep & Landing for the 2011 Christmas season, and to commemorate their 1000th show.

On December 3, 2011, Blizzard Entertainment held their annual Christmas party at Disney California Adventure and for the event a custom World of Color segment was produced featuring characters and game footage from Diablo III, StarCraft II: Wings of Liberty, and World of Warcraft.

During the Lunar New Year season, the regular show is preceded by a pre-show titled, Hurry Home — Lunar New Year Celebration. This six-minute pre-show is the story of a Little Lantern on its journey home to join its Lantern family in celebrating Lunar New Year features animated appearances by Mulan and Mushu in "dream sequences" inspired by traditional Chinese paper cut-out style animation and a score highlighted by an original arrangement of the music created for the grand opening ceremony of Shanghai Disney Resort by Academy Award-winning composer Tan Dun.

To promote Pixar's Elemental, World of Color – ONE was preceded by a limited-time pre-show titled, Elemental Connection which debuted on June 2, 2023.

To promote Disney's Wish, World of Color: Seasons of Light was preceded by a limited-time six-minute pre-show titled, Wish, which debuted on November 17, 2023, which was part of The Walt Disney Company's 100th Anniversary celebration.

To promote Pixar's Inside Out 2, World of Color – ONE was preceded by a limited-time pre-show titled, Emotional Rollercoaster, which debuted on May 31, 2024.

To promote Disney's Moana 2, World of Color: Seasons of Light was preceded by a limited-time pre-show titled, Boat Snack, which debuted on November 16, 2024.

== Subsequent versions ==
Following the debut of the original World of Color show in 2010, several different full-length iterations have been produced, often replacing the traditional show completely during park celebrations and holiday seasons. The original World of Color was last shown following the return of nighttime spectaculars to the Disneyland Resort in 2022. Since then, Season of Light, ONE, or Happiness have been shown in its place.

=== World of Color: Winter Dreams ===
From November 15, 2013, to January 6, 2014, a full-length show titled World of Color: Winter Dreams debuted. Hosted by Olaf the Snowman, the show celebrates the winter season with several holiday-themed segments, featuring scenes from Frozen, Toy Story, Bambi, Fantasia, One Hundred and One Dalmatians, Prep and Landing, Secret of the Wings, Tangled, Wreck-It Ralph, Melody Time, Lady and the Tramp, Mickey's Once Upon a Christmas, Beauty and the Beast: The Enchanted Christmas, and various vintage Mickey Mouse shorts. The show incorporates traditional holiday-related music, including Eric Whitacre's "Glow", "Carol of the Bells", "Let it Snow", "It's the Most Wonderful Time of the Year", "I'll Be Home for Christmas", "Believe", "Silent Night", "Thankful", the "Nutcracker Suite", "Jingle Bells", "I Have a Little Dreidel", "Feliz Navidad", "Joy to the World", and "Have Yourself A Merry Little Christmas", as well as Disney songs, such as "I See the Light", "Let It Go" and "In Summer". The show features vocals by Heather Headley.

In November 2014, World of Color: Winter Dreams opened with a different show than its pilot year. The pre-show segment of Glow has been removed; its music plays after the post-show segment as exit music. There is a reorganization of the Toy Story version of The Nutcracker with one song cut. Overall the show faced major rearrangement, such as additional songs from Frozen, including "Love Is an Open Door" and "Do You Want to Build a Snowman?". In the "Believe" segment, the old paper animation and guest made greeting cards were replaced with both new and familiar scenes from Big Hero 6, Peter Pan, Alice in Wonderland, The Princess and the Frog, The Hunchback of Notre Dame, The Little Mermaid, Cinderella, Brave, Beauty and the Beast, Aladdin and Pinocchio.

In November 2015, two different World of Color shows were presented back-to-back: Winter Dreams was followed by World of Color: Celebrate!. "Love Is an Open Door" from Frozen was removed and the additional lights installed for World of Color: Celebrate! on California Screamin' were incorporated into Winter Dreams. The rest of the show is the same as the show from the 2014 holiday season. The scrim made for World of Color – Celebrate! to cover Mickey's head on Mickey's Fun Wheel is raised up before Winter Dreams but is only used for Celebrate.

=== World of Color: Celebrate! The Wonderful World of Walt Disney ===
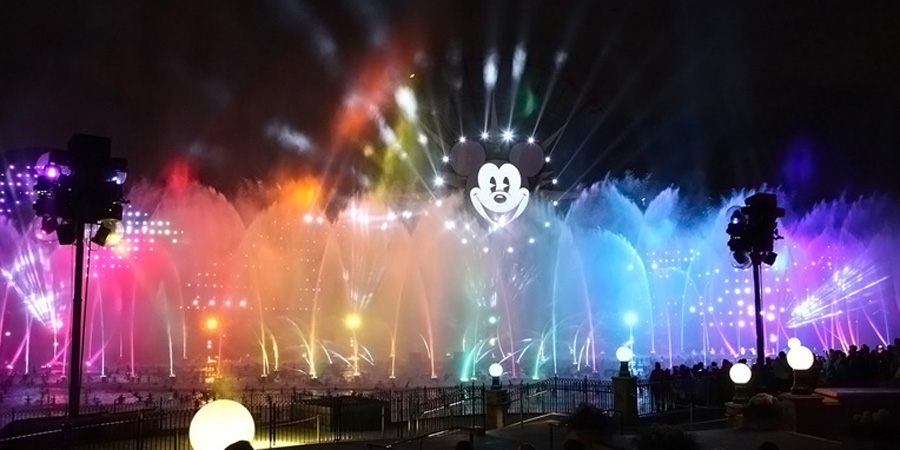
The intro of World of Color: Celebrate!

Premiering on May 22, 2015, as part of the Disneyland Resort's 60th Anniversary celebration, the World of Color show was changed to World of Color: Celebrate! The Wonderful World of Walt Disney. Dedicated to Walt Disney's legacy, this special edition of the show is hosted by Neil Patrick Harris and Mickey Mouse, and features music and imagery from Disney films and theme parks. Under the direction of Steve Davison, the show took nearly three years to develop. The show was returned to its original format on September 6, 2016.

Celebrate! contains five sections:

- "Opening": Hosts Neil Patrick Harris and Mickey Mouse are introduced, accompanied by a new arrangement of the World of Color theme. Harris begins to describe Walt Disney's lifetime achievements and milestones including in the creation of Mickey, feature animation, and the conception of Disneyland. Archival footage of Disney is featured throughout the subsequent scenes.
- "It Was All Started by a Mouse": Dedicated to the creation and career of Mickey Mouse, featuring footage from Mickey Mouse cartoons and feature films including the "Sorcerer's Apprentice" segment from Fantasia and the Mickey Mouse Club theme song.
- "The Golden Age of Animation": Highlights the significance of the first feature-length animated film, Snow White and the Seven Dwarfs, followed by a montage of animated feature films from Walt Disney Animation Studios and Pixar Animation Studios. The montage concludes with the "Let It Go" sequence from Frozen.
- "The Dream of Disneyland": Focusing on the creation of Disneyland park, with iconic attractions found across the Disneyland Resort, including the Enchanted Tiki Room, Splash Mountain, Radiator Springs Racers, Pirates of the Caribbean, Haunted Mansion, It's a Small World, and Star Tours – The Adventures Continue, with the latter incorporating footage from Star Wars: The Force Awakens. The sequence is ended with a newly recorded rendition of "Forever Young" performed by Christina Perri.
- "Finale – Infinity & Beyond – A Celebration for Years to Come": The show's finale with a tribute to Walt Disney's legacy, featuring archival images of Walt Disney throughout his career, imagery from Disney parks worldwide, as well as scenes from various Walt Disney Studios films.

The post-show includes a fountain overlay set to Perri's renditions of Bob Dylan's "Forever Young" and Howard Ashman and Marvin Hamlisch's "Disneyland".

=== World of Color: Season of Light ===
In September 2016, Disney announced that World of Color: Winter Dreams would be replaced with a brand new holiday show called World of Color: Season of Light, which will "celebrate the warm and heartfelt spirit of the holidays." and feature Disney moments intertwined with the holidays. This version features holiday songs and incorporates moments from Disney films to illustrate such songs.

The following songs are included in the show with the featured films in parentheses.

- Intro Medley: "Deck the Halls"/"Have Yourself a Merry Little Christmas"/"It's the Most Wonderful Time of the Year"/"Santa Claus is Coming to Town"/"Deck the Halls"/"Joy to the World"
- "The Christmas Song" by Nat King Cole (Mickey's Once Upon a Christmas, Mickey's Christmas Carol)
- "White Christmas", "Let it Snow" by Dean Martin (Frozen, The Art of Skiing, The Many Adventures of Winnie the Pooh, Melody Time)
- "Baby, It's Cold Outside" by Michael Bublé and Idina Menzel (Cinderella, Aladdin, Snow White and the Seven Dwarfs, Sleeping Beauty, Tangled, Tarzan, Beauty and the Beast, Pocahontas, The Little Mermaid)
- "Have Yourself a Merry Little Christmas" by Amy Grant (Lady and the Tramp, Tarzan, Tangled, The Lion King, Finding Nemo, Pinocchio, Inside Out, Bambi, Toy Story, The Good Dinosaur, Up, The Jungle Book, Hercules, Mulan, Zootopia, Dumbo)
- "Mele Kalikimaka" by Bing Crosby and the Andrews Sisters (Lilo & Stitch)
- "Feliz Navidad" by José Feliciano (The Three Caballeros)
- "O Tannenbaum", "Dance of the Sugar Plum Fairy"/"Russian Dance" by Pentatonix (Fantasia)
- "Wizards in Winter" by Trans-Siberian Orchestra (Mickey's Once Upon a Christmas)
- "Blue Christmas" by Elvis Presley (Inside Out)
- "Thankful" by Heather Headley (Up, Toy Story 3, The Hunchback of Notre Dame, The Lion King, Hercules, Pocahontas, WALL-E, The Princess and the Frog, Peter Pan, Wreck-It Ralph, Monsters, Inc., Zootopia, Frozen, Tangled)
- "Let There Be Peace on Earth" by Heather Headley
- "This Is My Wish" by Kevin Ross
- "Joy to the World" by Heather Headley

The World of Color: Season of Light has remained the same as of 2016.

=== World of Color: Celebrate You! ===
On September 15, 2016, Disney hosted a special private event to honor their Disneyland Resort employees and cast members who served magic in the parks for 10 years to 60 years. This show was a two-time spectacular only made for those special events. The show was held at Paradise Bay at Disney California Adventure on September 15, 2016, Cinderella Castle at Walt Disney World's Magic Kingdom in the following months, and at Disney California Adventure again in November 2019 and November 2022.

The show featured the World of Color stage itself, and during the show, it also synchronized fireworks to it (fireworks on World of Color are mainly featured only for special events, e.g. July 4 pre-shows, New Year's Eve, special events, private events, etc.)

The theme used for the show is Fantasy in the Sky, even though the show itself had a variety of songs featured in it. After the show included the Diamond Celebration Theme Music "Live the Magic" as the exit music. However, the ballad version was used for the exit music.

=== World of Color: Villainous ===
On September 17, 2019, during Oogie Boogie Bash Halloween Party nights, the water show had a makeover with a villain-themed show called Villainous. The story focused on a young girl named Shelley Marie who has encounters with many Disney Villains. This version was only played during the 2019 Halloween season.

=== World of Color: One ===
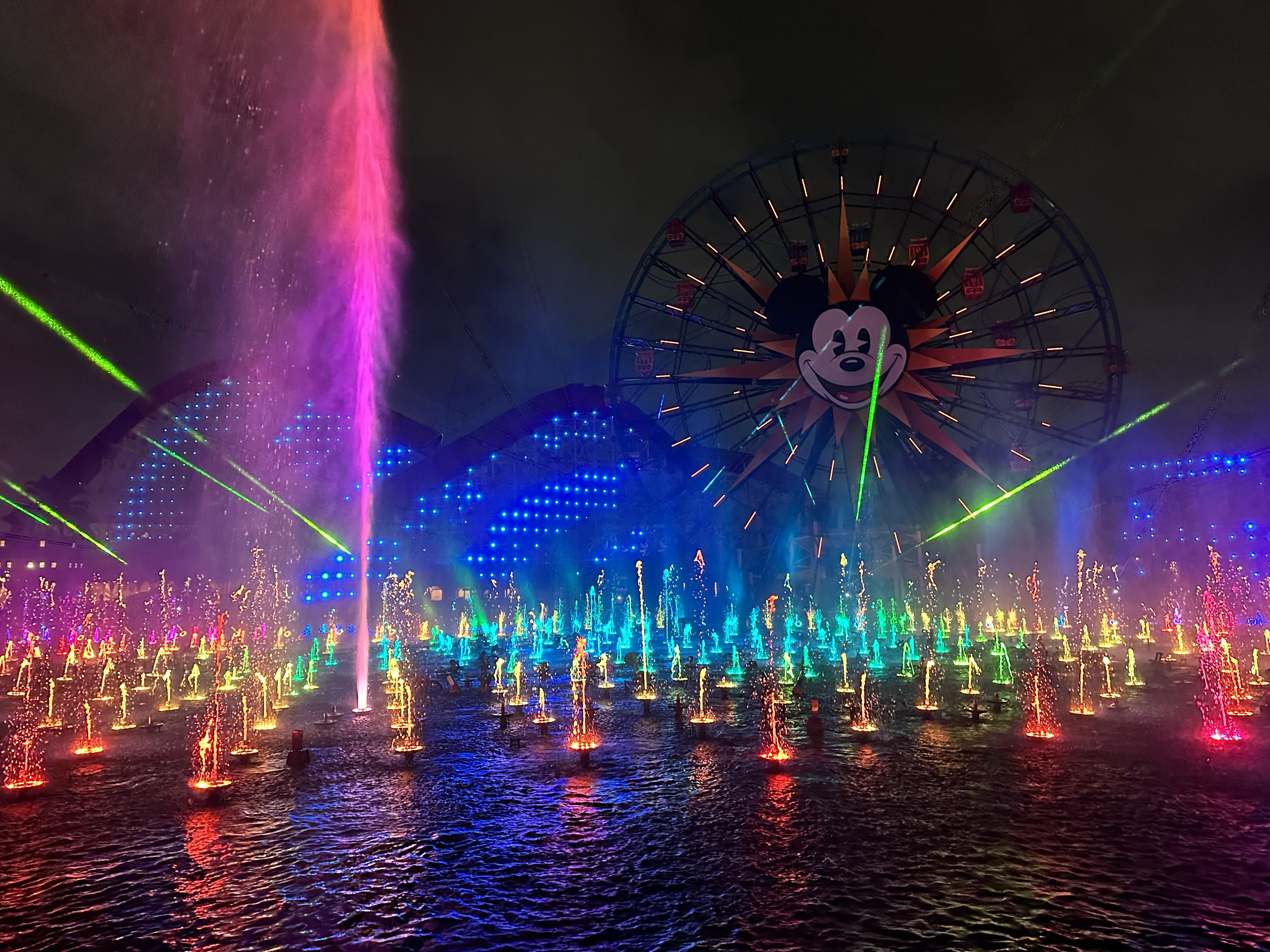
World of Color – ONE in February 2023

World of Color – ONE celebrates the storytelling legacy started by Walt Disney a century ago, as part of Disney's centennial celebration. It tells a new story of how a single action, like a drop of water, creates a ripple that can grow into a wave of change. The show depicts the journeys of some of the most courageous and inspiring characters, such as Pocahontas, Mirabel Madrigal, Remy, Joe Gardner, Miguel, Luke Skywalker, Simba, Mulan, Moana, and the Avengers. The show is the first Disneyland Resort nighttime spectacular to showcase characters and films created from Walt Disney Animation Studios, Pixar, Lucasfilm, and Marvel Studios together in one production. The show also features a new original song, "Start a Wave", featuring vocalist, Loren Allred and written by Cody Fry. World of Color – ONE debuted on January 27, 2023.

The following films are included in the show with featured music in parentheses: Pocahontas ("Colors of the Wind"), Encanto ("Waiting on a Miracle"), Ratatouille, Soul, Coco ("Remember Me"), Star Wars ("Main Title theme" / "Binary Sunset"), The Lion King, Mulan ("Reflection"), Moana ("How Far I'll Go" / "I Am Moana"), and Marvel Cinematic Universe (The Avengers theme).

World of Color – ONE was replaced on May 16, 2025 with World of Color Happiness! in honor of the Disneyland Resort's 70th Anniversary. On June 2, 2026, it was announced that World of Color – ONE will return on August 10, 2026.

=== Wold of Color Happiness! ===
World of Color Happiness! explores happiness and is hosted by the emotions from Inside Out and Inside Out 2. The pre-show features the Muppets, marking the characters first appearance in a Disneyland nightime spectacular. They attempt to deliver the safety spiel to the audience, culminating in a musical finale. Kermit the Frog, Miss Piggy and several other Muppets make appearances.

World of Color Happiness! debuted on May 16, 2025, until the final performance on August 9, 2026. It was developed for the 70th Anniversary of the Disneyland Resort, which revolves around the "Celebrate Happy" theme. The show is inspired by Walt Disney's words from the opening-day dedication of Disneyland: "To all who come to this happy place… welcome!" Walt Disney's audio of the quote opens and closes the main show.

The opening sequence features scenes and music from classic Disney films, showcasing their happy moments. Films include Dumbo, The Lion King, Snow White and the Seven Dwarfs, Cinderella, Peter Pan, and more.

Throughout the show, Joy leads the emotions in trying to discover what happiness is. In the end, happiness is all of the emotions and colors together. There is also a post-show "surprise", featuring various Disney characters dancing to the original song "Makes Me Wanna Move" by Fitz and the Tantrums.

The following films are included in the show with featured music in parentheses: Inside Out ("Bundle of Joy"), The Muppet Movie ("Rainbow Connection", performed by Boyz II Men), Tarzan ("Trashin' the Camp"), Turning Red ("Nobody Like U"), Mulan ("True to Your Heart"), A Goofy Movie ("I2I"), Wish ("This Wish"), Tangled ("I've Got a Dream" / "When Will My Life Begin"), The Incredibles ("The Glory Days"), Moana ("How Far I'll Go"), Hercules ("Go the Distance"), Encanto ("Surface Pressure"), Frozen II ("Into the Unknown").

== See also ==
- Fantasmic!
