= Maliboomer =

Defunct Disneyland attraction

Coordinates: 33.80519°N 117.92287°W

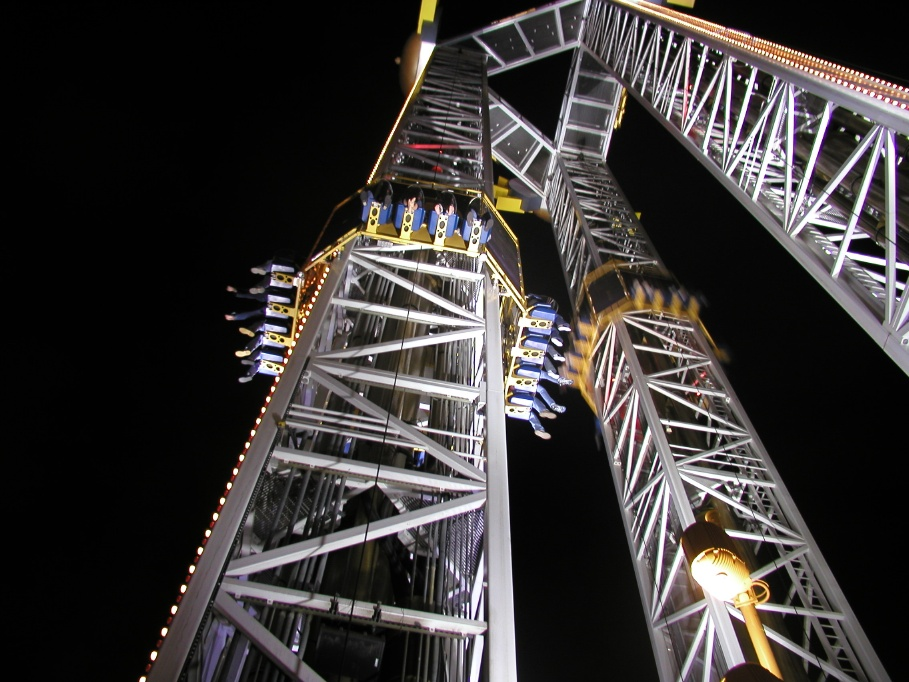
- Maliboomer at night

Disney California Adventure
- Area: Paradise Pier
- Status: Removed
- Opening date: February 8, 2001
- Closing date: September 6, 2010
- Replaced by: Inside Out Emotional Whirlwind (Pixar Pier)

Ride statistics
- Attraction type: Space Shot
- Manufacturer: S&S Worldwide
- Designer: Walt Disney Imagineering
- Height: 180 ft (55 m)
- Speed: 40 mph (64 km/h)
- G-force: 3.5
- Vehicles: 3
- Riders per vehicle: 16
- Rows: 4
- Riders per row: 4
- Duration: 1:30
- Height restriction: 52 in (132 cm)
- Single rider line was available

The Maliboomer was an attraction at the Paradise Pier section of Disney California Adventure at the Disneyland Resort in Anaheim, California, US. It opened on February 8, 2001 and closed on September 6, 2010. Manufactured by S&S Power, Mailboomer was a Space Shot attraction, meaning it launched guests from the bottom of the tower instead of slowly lifting them to the top and dropping them from there. The ride was pneumatically powered, with three connected towers, each with its own independent ride system. It also contained "Scream Shields", used to block the screams from reaching residents of Anaheim and neighboring Garden Grove as the park is located near a residential area.

== History ==
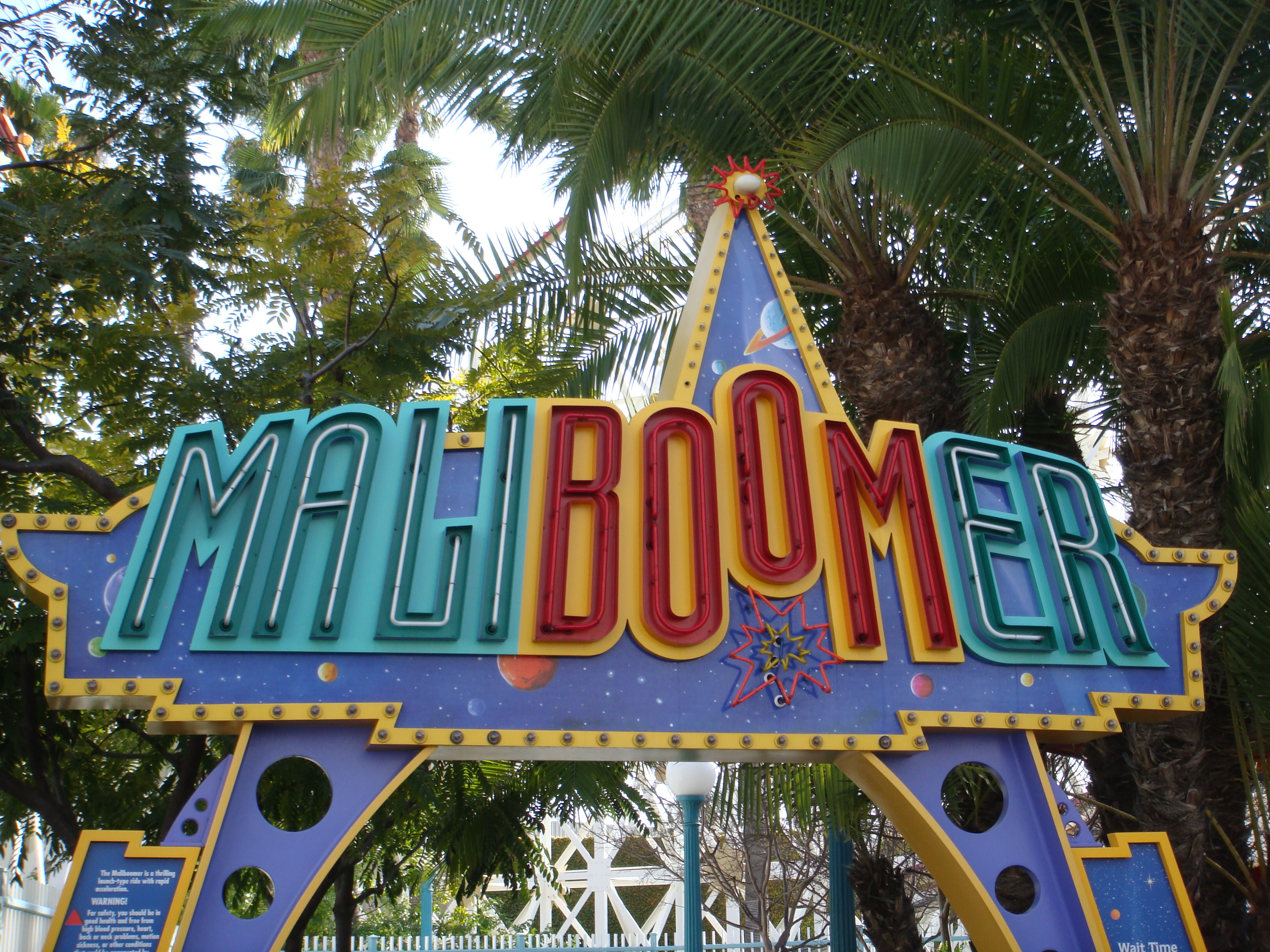
Maliboomer's entrance.

In the late 1990s, Disney wanted to build a low-cost theme park next to Disneyland with the use of off-the-shelf rides. One of these attractions would be a drop tower named Maliboomer. The concept came from a space-themed version of the High striker attraction on many boardwalks and carnivals. The name also hinted at this theme, since it alludes to the beach town of Malibu, California. In 1998, Disney revealed more details about the new park, including the name Disney's California Adventure. Maliboomer would be a Space Shot ride built by S&S Power and feature three towers. Construction of Maliboomer would begin one year later in 1999.

Maliboomer officially opened to the general public on February 8, 2001, along with the park. With a max height of 180 feet (55 m), it was the park's tallest attraction upon opening.

As part of the park's multi-year, $1.1 billion expansion, it was announced that Maliboomer would be removed. On August 6, 2010, Disney California Adventure announced that Maliboomer would be closing. The ride's last operating day was September 6, 2010, and the dismantling of the attraction began shortly afterwards.

The ride's former concrete pad and railings remained for several years and its spot was used for character meet and greets and a smoking area. On June 28, 2019, the Inside Out Emotional Whirlwind attraction, inspired by Pixar's 2015 film Inside Out, opened in the space where Maliboomer once stood.
