= Games of Pixar Pier =

Boardwalk games at Disney California Adventure

Disney California Adventure
- Area: Paradise Pier (2001–2018); Pixar Pier (2018–Present)
- Coordinates: 33°48′17.07″N 117°55′20.15″W
- Status: Operating
- Opening date: February 8, 2001 (as Games of the Boardwalk); June 23, 2018 (as Games of Pixar Pier)
- Closing date: January 8, 2018 (as Games of the Boardwalk)

Ride statistics
- Attraction type: Carnival games
- Previously known as: Games of the Boardwalk (2001–2018)

Games of Pixar Pier is a collection of four boardwalk games themed to several different Pixar characters. It is located in Pixar Pier at Disney California Adventure.

== History ==
=== Paradise Pier ===
Games of the Boardwalk officially opened in 2001 with the rest of Disney California Adventure. Originally, the games included Boardwalk Bowl, Dolphin Derby, San Joaquin Volley, Shore Shot, Angels in the Outfield, New Haul Fishery, and Cowhuenga Pass.

In 2008, with construction beginning on Toy Story Midway Mania!, many of the original were either closed or re-themed. This renovation was part of the $1.1 billion expansion project for Disney California Adventure. The new games opened on April 7, 2009, and included Goofy About Fishin', Casey at the Bat, Bullseye Stallion Stampede, and Dumbo Bucket Brigade.

=== Pixar Pier ===
The Games of the Boardwalk closed on January 8, 2018, during the re-theming of Paradise Pier to Pixar Pier. During this transformation, the Games of the Boardwalk were renamed Games of Pixar Pier. They opened with Pixar Pier on June 23, 2018.

Bullseye Stallion Stampede, themed to Toy Story 2, remained. The other three games were turned into La Luna Star Catcher, themed to the short film La Luna, WALL-E Space Race, themed to WALL-E, and Heimlich's Candy Corn Toss, themed to A Bug's Life.
