= Luxo Jr. (character) =

Desk lamp & mascot of Pixar Animation Studios

- Pixar character
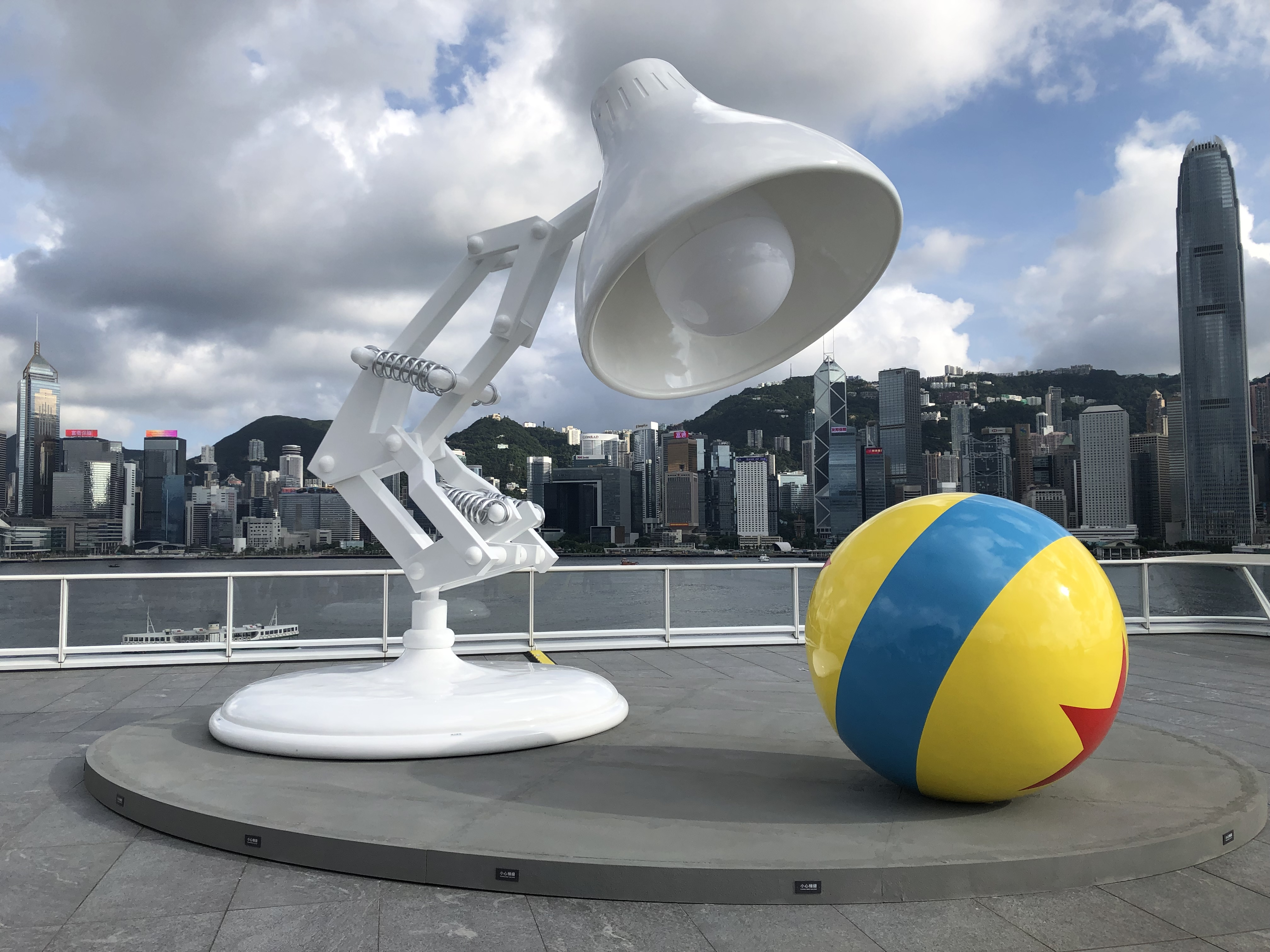
- Statue of Luxo Jr. in Hong Kong
- First appearance: Luxo Jr.; August 17, 1986
- Created by: John Lasseter

In-universe information
- Species: Toy desk lamp

Luxo Jr. is a semi-anthropomorphic toy desk lamp character used as the primary mascot of Pixar Animation Studios. He is the protagonist of the short film Luxo Jr. and appears on the production logo of every Pixar film, hopping into view and jumping on the capital letter "I" in "PIXAR" to flatten it ever since 1995. John Lasseter created the character, modeling it after his own Luxo brand lamp. Lasseter based its infant-like proportions on Spencer, the toddler son of Pixar team member Tom Porter. The 1986 short, in which the lamp plays with a ball alongside a larger lamp, Luxo Sr., debuted at that year's SIGGRAPH show in Dallas and demonstrated advances in self-shadowing. Luxo Jr. also appeared in four educational shorts that Pixar made for Sesame Street in 1991, and animatronic figures of the character have stood at Disney's Hollywood Studios and Disney California Adventure.

In 2009, the manufacturer of Luxo lamps sued Disney, the parent company of Pixar, for selling Luxo Jr.-branded merchandise.

== Creation ==
John Lasseter used a Luxo lamp on his drawing table as a graphic rendering model. He experimented with the model, using it for motion studies. He demonstrated the animated Luxo model at an animation festival in Brussels, Belgium. Lasseter did not plan on creating a story for the lamp, but the Belgian animator Raoul Servais urged him to write a plot. Servais said that "No matter how short it is, it should have a beginning, a middle, and an end. Don't forget the story." Servais persuaded Lasseter that the length of the animation would not impede the story, telling him "You can tell a story in ten seconds."

The inspiration for the Luxo Jr. character came from Lasseter's interactions with Spencer, the young son of Tom Porter, who is a Pixar team member. Lasseter wondered if the body proportions of a child could be applied to a lamp. He said that "Spencer was about one and a half, and seeing him hold his arms up over his head made me laugh because he couldn't really touch the top of his head yet. After he left, I started thinking, what would a baby lamp look like?" He changed the proportions of the lamp model to make it more infant-like, giving a large head and a small body. Lasseter did not modify the size of the light bulb. He imagined that the store-bought bulb was separate from the lamp's "body" and did not age.

== Films ==
=== Luxo Jr. ===
Lasseter followed advice from Servais and conceived the plot for a short film starring Luxo Jr. as the protagonist. The short film would have two characters, Luxo Jr. and a bigger lamp named Luxo Sr. Luxo Jr. plays with a small ball, but jumping on the ball causes it to deflate. Saddened by the loss of the toy, Luxo Jr. hops off-screen. Luxo Jr. finds a beach ball and reappears chasing after it, while the parent lamp shakes its head.

Luxo Jr. demonstrated advances in the technology of self-shadowing. Lasseter said that "The animation of a lamp whose head is a light-source, moving around and self-shadowing the world around him, was a perfect matching of technology and subject matter." Luxo Jr. made its debut at the 1986 SIGGRAPH show in Dallas, Texas. The film received critical acclaim for its photorealistic style and emotional impact.

=== Sesame Street shorts ===
Luxo Jr. can also be seen in four educational short films, which were created by Pixar especially for PBS's Sesame Street (removed in repeats in 2004 due to copyright issues with Disney) in 1991: Light & Heavy, Surprise, Up and Down and Front and Back.

- Light & Heavy: Luxo Jr. demonstrates both light and heavy by using a beach ball to demonstrate light and later a bowling ball to demonstrate heavy.
- Surprise: Luxo Sr. examines a box in which Luxo Jr. pops out, demonstrating surprise.
- Up and Down: Luxo Jr. demonstrates up and down by jumping on and off of a cardboard box until he falls through.
- Front and Back: Luxo, Jr. demonstrates front and back by showing his front and back until he gets exhausted and falls over.

=== Toy Story series ===
In the Toy Story franchise, a red Luxo lamp can be seen on Andy's desk and in Toy Story 3 as a pink Luxo Jr. lamp.

=== Logo appearances ===
Luxo Jr. is Pixar's mascot, and as such, has appeared in the logo of every film from the studio since 1995, when it debuted with Toy Story, the studio's first feature film.

== Animatronic ==
A 6-foot-high (1.8 m) animatronic figure modeled after Luxo Jr. stood near the Toy Story Midway Mania attraction at the Disney's Hollywood Studios theme park. The animatronic often danced to music on a ledge near the entrance. In 2010, Disney removed the animatronic without offering an official explanation, but the Luxo ASA lawsuit may have been a factor.

At Disney California Adventure, there is an animatronic of Luxo Jr. on top of the Pixar Pier marquee.

== Lawsuit ==
Luxo ASA, the Norwegian company that manufactures Luxo lamps, sued Pixar and its parent company Disney in 2009 by claiming that Disney violated its trademarks by selling promotional lamps branded as the Luxo Jr. character. Disney had planned on bundling the Luxo Jr. lamp with the collector's edition of the Up Blu-ray release. Luxo ASA claimed that the Luxo Jr. merchandise would "cause devastating damage to Luxo and dilute the goodwill which Luxo has built up." Disney settled with Luxo ASA and agreed not to sell Luxo Jr. lamps while Luxo ASA did not object to "artistic renditions" of the lamp and allowed Pixar to keep using Luxo Jr. as a character.

== See also ==
- Minions: small, yellow, pill-shaped, childlike creatures who serve as the mascots of Illumination and characters from the Despicable Me franchise.
- List of mascots
