= Incredicoaster =

Roller coaster in California

- Previously known as California Screamin' (2001–2018)
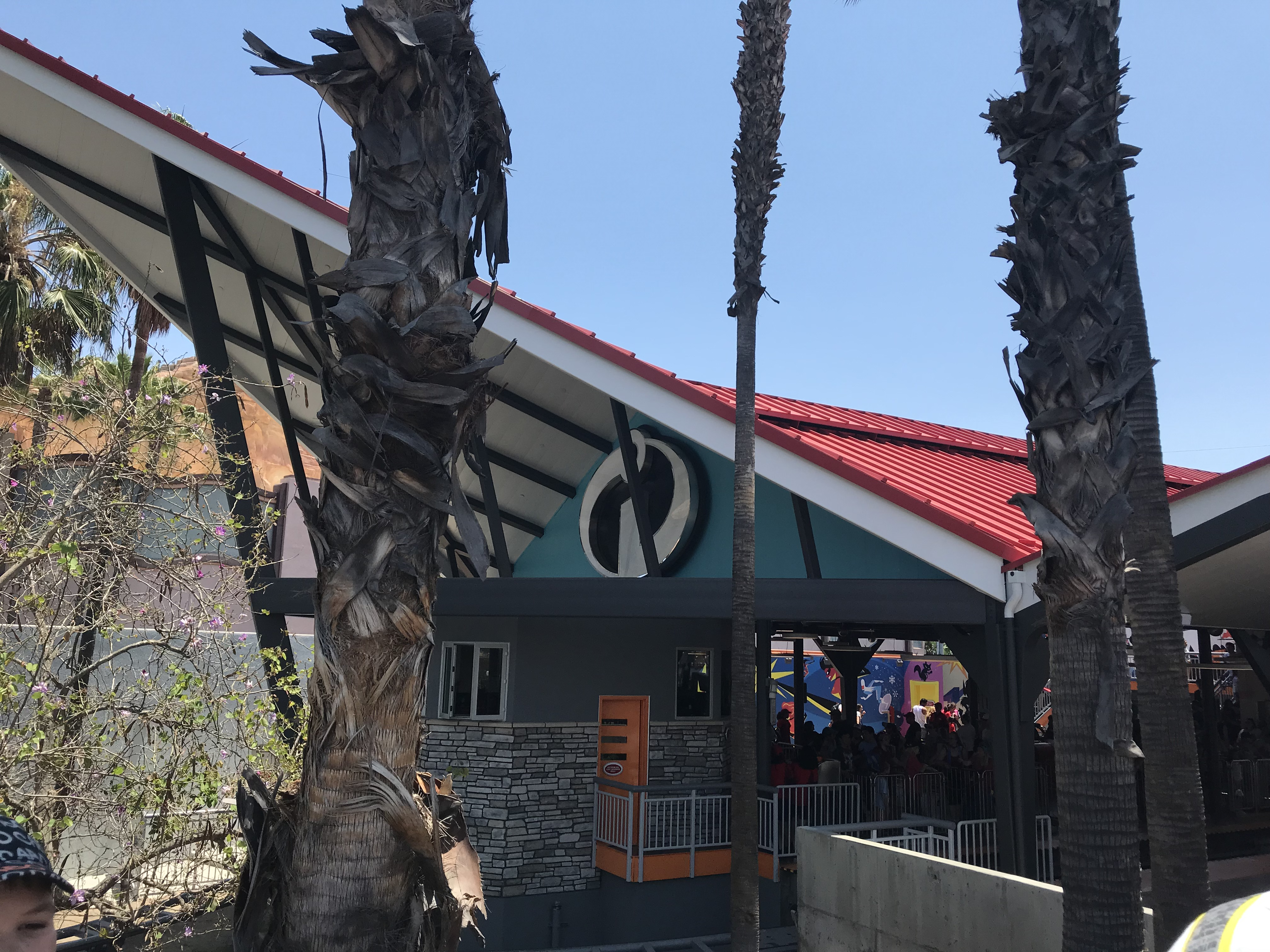

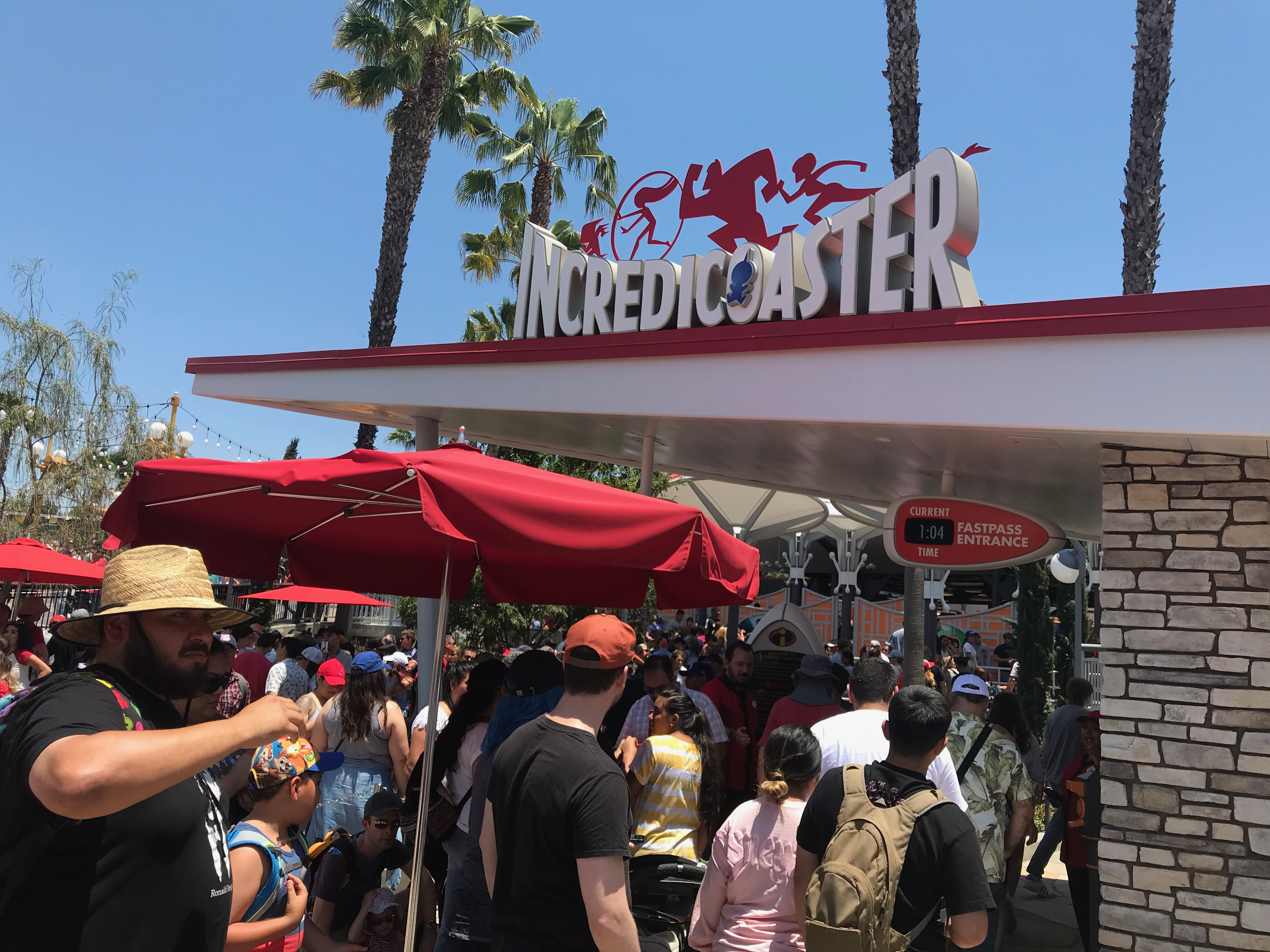
- The ride loading area and the entrance to the Incredicoaster at the Disney California Adventure park (2018)

Disney California Adventure
- Location: Disney California Adventure
- Park section: Pixar Pier
- Coordinates: 33.804584°N 117.921780°W
- Status: Operating
- Opening date: February 8, 2001 (as California Screamin'); June 23, 2018 (as Incredicoaster)
- Closing date: January 7, 2018 (as California Screamin')
- Cost: $50 million

General statistics
- Type: Steel – Launched
- Manufacturer: Intamin
- Designer: Werner Stengel
- Model: Loop
- Track layout: Custom
- Lift/launch system: LIM launch
- Height: 122 ft (37 m)
- Drop: 108 ft (33 m)
- Length: 6,072 ft (1,851 m)
- Speed: 55 mph (89 km/h)
- Inversions: 1
- Duration: 2:40
- Acceleration: 0 to 55 mph (0 to 89 km/h) in 4 seconds
- Height restriction: 48 in (122 cm)
- Trains: 6 cars; riders arranged 2 across in 2 rows for a total of 24 riders per train
- Theme: Boardwalk wooden coaster (2013–2018); The Incredibles (2018–present)
- Restraints: Over-the-shoulders restraint
- Hosts: None (2001–2006); Dee Bradley Baker (2006–2010); Neil Patrick Harris (2010–2018); Voice actors from The Incredibles (2018–present)
- Music: Gary Hoey and George Wilkins (2001–2018); Michael Giacchino (composition) and Jeff Kryka (orchestration) (2018–present)
- Lightning Lane Available
- Single rider line available
- Must transfer from wheelchair
- Incredicoaster at RCDB

Incredicoaster is a steel launched roller coaster located at Disney California Adventure in Anaheim, California, United States. Manufactured by Intamin, the ride was originally opened to the public as California Screamin' on February 8, 2001. It is the only roller coaster with an inversion at the Disneyland Resort, in addition to also being the fastest, reaching a maximum speed of 55 mph (89 km/h). With a track length of 6,072 feet (1,851 m), Incredicoaster is the seventh-longest steel roller coaster in the world.

California Screamin' permanently closed on the late evening of January 7, 2018 for a transformation and reopened as the Incredicoaster with the debut of Pixar Pier on June 23, 2018. Its theme is inspired by The Incredibles film franchise.

== History ==
In October 1998, following months of construction on the new California Adventure theme park next to Disneyland, Disney announced additional details about the park's rides and attractions set to open in 2001. Among them would be a state-of-the-art launched roller coaster named Surf City Wipeout. Prior to the park opening, the ride was renamed to California Screamin’, a play on words of the hit song California Dreamin'. It would use linear induction motor (LIM) launch technology to propel its riders to a maximum speed of 55 mph (89 km/h). Although made of steel, the ride would be designed to resemble a classic wooden coaster, and it would include a vertical loop in the signature shape of Mickey Mouse's head.

California Screamin' debuted in time with the park's grand opening on February 8, 2001. Designed by Werner Stengel and built by Intamin, it features a track length of 6,072 feet (1,851 m), making it the sixth-longest steel coaster in the world and third-longest in the US behind Fury 325 at Carowinds and Millennium Force at Cedar Point. Materials used to build the attraction included 11,500,000 pounds (5,200,000 kg) of concrete for the footers, 36 miles (58 km) of electric cables, 167 miles (269 km) of conductors, and 5,800,000 pounds (2,600,000 kg) of steel. It also became the longest roller coaster in the world to feature an inversion after the vertical loop on Son of Beast at Kings Island was removed in 2006.

In addition to the LIM launch that propels the train up the first hill, an additional LIM Boost is used on the main lift midway through the ride. These motors are used in lieu of a traditional lift hill chain. The coaster is one of Disney Parks' fastest attractions, accelerating guests from zero to 55 mph (89 km/h) in four seconds. Since the resort was located next to a residential area, Disney had installed tunnels throughout the ride to block the screams from riders and reduce noise complaints from nearby residents of Anaheim and neighboring Garden Grove.

Like several other coasters in Disney Parks, California Screamin' featured an onboard audio soundtrack during the ride, created by Gary Hoey and George Wilkins. On January 3, 2007, as part of the "Rockin' Both Parks" campaign, the audio track was temporarily replaced by a remixed version of "Around the World" by Red Hot Chili Peppers, and the attraction was renamed Rockin' California Screamin'. This was promoted along with Rockin' Space Mountain, a similar change made to Space Mountain in Disneyland, though that ride's audio was changed to the Red Hot Chili Peppers' cover version of "Higher Ground". The standard audio track was restored when the campaign ended.

After the refurbishment of Disney California Adventure, from 2008 to 2009, the Mickey Mouse head located behind the vertical loop was changed to a sunburst icon with the Paradise Pier logo.

On July 15, 2017, Disney announced a complete renovation of Paradise Pier, renaming it Pixar Pier. Meanwhile, rumors began to circulate that California Screamin' would be rethemed to Pixar Animation Studios' The Incredibles. On November 2, it was confirmed that the ride would be remodeled. California Screamin' closed on January 8, 2018, for the transformation into Incredicoaster. The remodel would include a new queue line, engineering reboots of the existing launch system, new storyline, enclosed scream tunnels and a new soundtrack. The new trains were unveiled in April. Incredicoaster opened on June 23, 2018, to coincide with the release of Incredibles 2.

== Pre-show and ride ==
TV screens display news footage of the Incredibles and Edna Mode being interviewed for a classic roller coaster's rebranding as Incredicoaster. While they are being interviewed, Jack-Jack uses his unpredictable superpowers, much to his family's frustration and Edna's amusement. As the guests board the cars and take off from the station, Elastigirl asks Edna to look after Jack-Jack. The guests pass by the VIP room where Edna watches Jack-Jack as he teleports around. Moments later, Edna announces that Jack-Jack has escaped. The Incredibles then take off throughout the ride trying to catch Jack-Jack as he uses his vast array of super powers to "attack" certain points on the ride as the coaster arrives in the launch area.

After Dash gives the fast countdown for 5 seconds, the train is launched at 55 mph into the first tunnel, accompanied by a stream of water jets that glow red to simulate Dash's super speed, barely visible during the day and clear at night. In the first tunnel, Dash tries to use his super speed to catch Jack-Jack, while Jack-Jack shoots lasers from his eyes. The train then exits the tunnel as it descends the drop and rises uphill onto the first block brake and then navigates a right hand turn around the Inside Out Emotional Whirlwind before passing under the outbound track and climbing up the main lift, which uses LIMs to propel the train. When new, this was the first use of Linear Induction Motor (LIM) technology that allowed a roller coaster vehicle to travel on an inclined angle.

As the train crests the hill, it enters the second tunnel, where Elastigirl tries using her stretching powers to grab Jack-Jack while he is phasing in and out of the tunnel wall. Past the crest of the hill, Mr. Incredible has used his super strength to smash through the wall and is trying to catch Jack-Jack by offering him a cookie, after which the train drops out of the tunnel. Exiting this tunnel, the ride goes through a three-quarter turn before diving into the vertical loop. Following this, the train dives through the third tunnel, which Jack-Jack has set ablaze with his fire powers, forcing Violet to put an invisible forcefield around the tunnel to put out the flames and keep the riders safe as they make another loop around the Inside Out Emotional Whirlwind.

After hitting the second block brake section, the track passes through a series of airtime filled bunny hop hills as it passes over Toy Story Midway Mania, where Jack-Jack makes multiple versions of himself pop up everywhere. The train then rises into the third and final block brake section. After dropping off the block brakes, the train traverses through a 270-degree downward spiral that leads into a straight section of track with one last bunny hop, which is followed by a final 100-degree left turn into the final brake run, as Jack-Jack makes it back safely. This time he has increased in size, but Edna manages to keep him calm by giving him a cookie. The train then makes another left turn before returning to the station.

== Safety design ==
The original safety announcements were recorded by Dee Bradley Baker. On November 5, 2010, the announcements were updated with the voice of Neil Patrick Harris. Baker and Harris also recorded audio for the launch, counting down for guests. There are 108 acoustic devices to play the onboard audio aboard each train, including high-range speakers in the headrests, mid-range speakers near riders' ears, and subwoofers under each rider's seat.

The tubes through which the coaster shoots enable the coaster to comply with Orange County sound ordinances, projecting noise in the direction of the park, in addition to concealing scenes with characters.

== Cast ==
- Craig T. Nelson as Mr. Incredible
- Holly Hunter as Elastigirl
- Sarah Vowell as Violet Parr
- Huck Milner as Dash Parr
- Brad Bird as Edna Mode

== Incidents ==
In August 2001, Dr. David Heber, a Milwaukee surgeon, suffered a neurological disorder and whiplash after his restraint locked at eye level. He sued Disney in 2003, alleging equipment failure, lack of lubrication and ride operators failing to notice his unlocked restraint. However, Heber lost.

On July 29, 2005, multiple guests were injured when the purple train rear-ended the orange train. Of the 48 guests aboard the two trains, 15 were taken to the hospital for treatment of minor injuries. The accident occurred on the section of track about 30 feet (9.1 m) short of the loading station. A full ride stop was activated with the orange train stopped. The brake segment that was supposed to have stopped the purple train failed, and the purple train continued until it collided with the stopped orange train. An investigation showed that a faulty brake valve, installed a few days earlier by Disney (not by the ride manufacturer Intamin) was the cause.

On July 22, 2011, 23 people were rescued from California Screamin' by firefighters when a rider's backpack fell out of a train and landed on the track, causing the orange train to valley between the loop and the next block section. It reopened two days later after the train was winched up the next hill, had its damaged wheels replaced and was allowed to complete the circuit.

On August 6, 2016, passengers on the ride were stranded for 45 minutes before being rescued when a fallen purse triggered an automatic stop.

== Rankings ==
Golden Ticket Awards: Top steel Roller Coasters
Year									1998	1999
Ranking									–	–
Year	2000	2001	2002	2003	2004	2005	2006	2007	2008	2009
Ranking	–	47 (tie)	29	43	41	–	–	49	–	–
Year	2010	2011	2012	2013	2014	2015	2016	2017	2018	2019
Ranking	–	–	–	–	–	–	–	–	–	–
Year	2020	2021	2022	2023	2024	2025	2026			
Ranking	N/A	–	–	–	–	–	–			

== Gallery ==
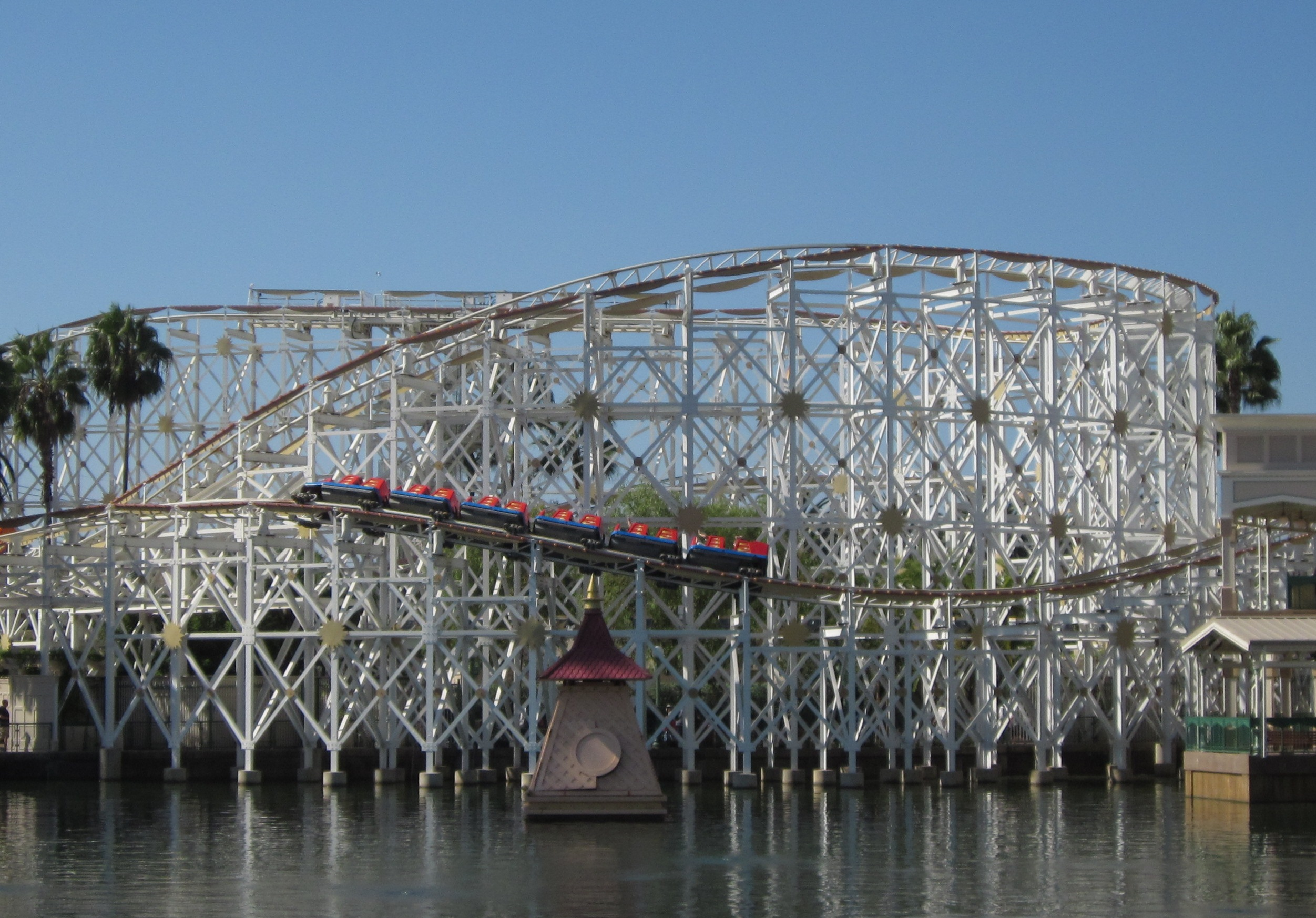
California Screamin' roller coaster

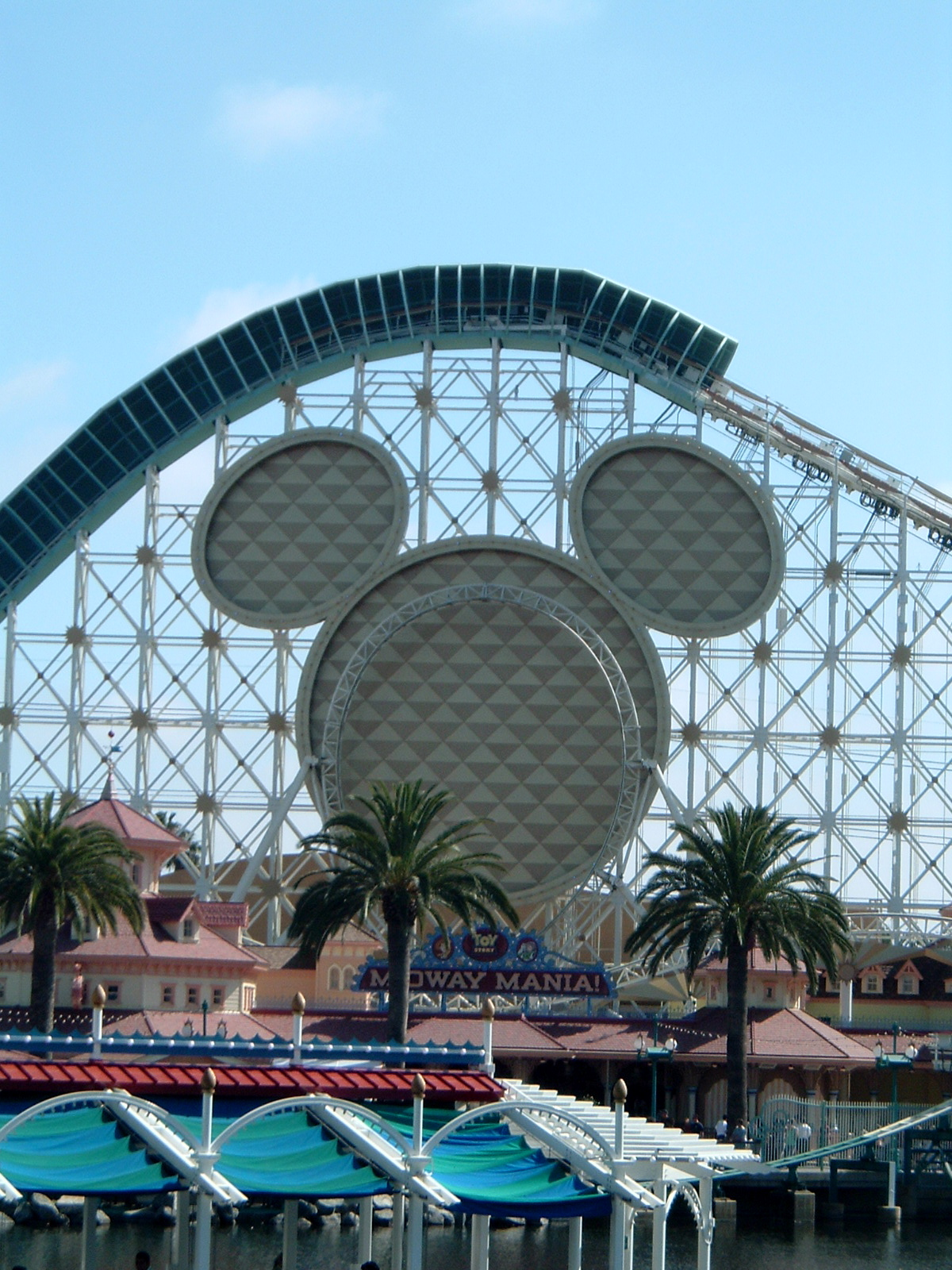
The roller coaster's loop with the former Mickey Mouse head

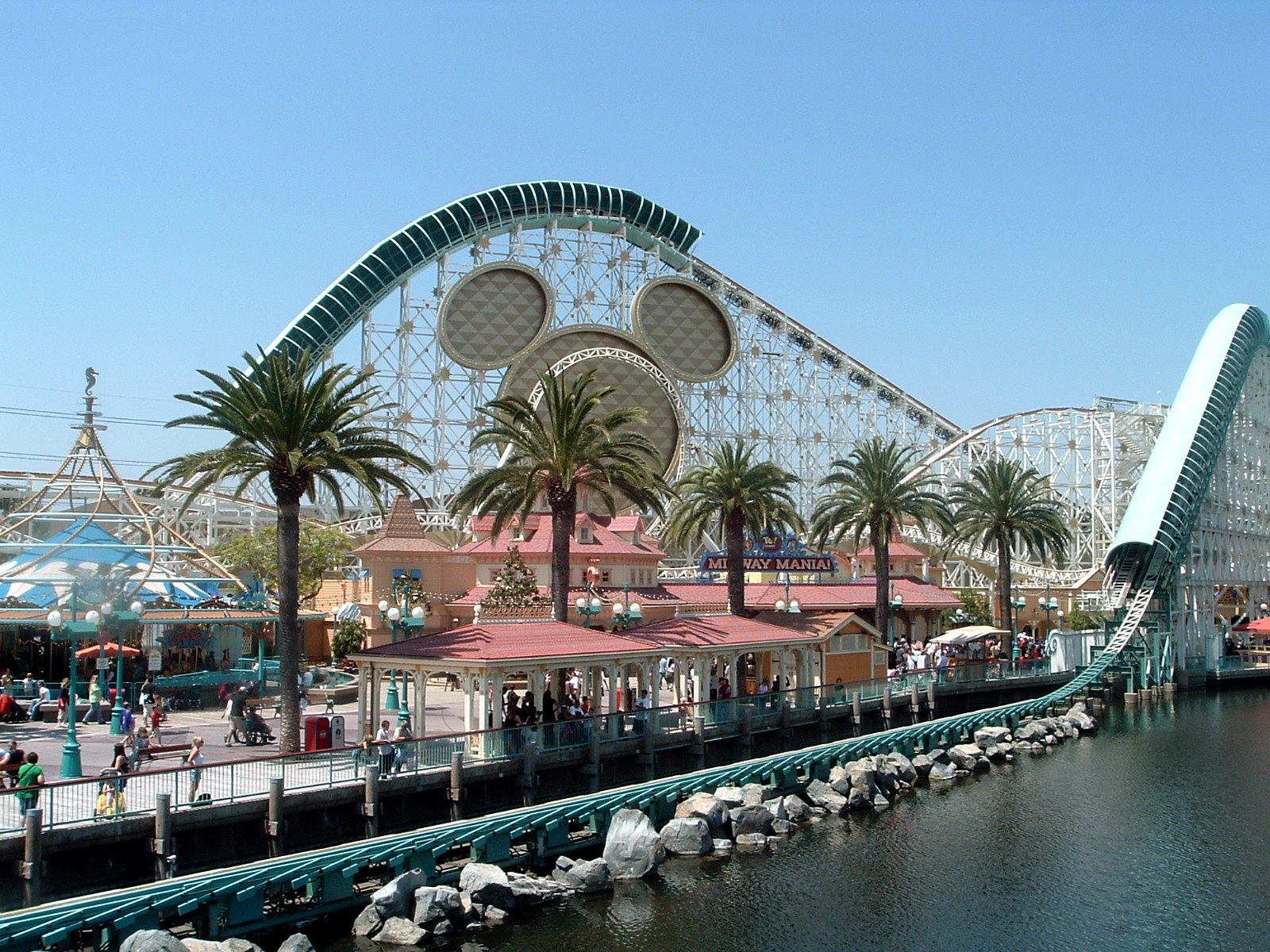
California Screamin' launching area

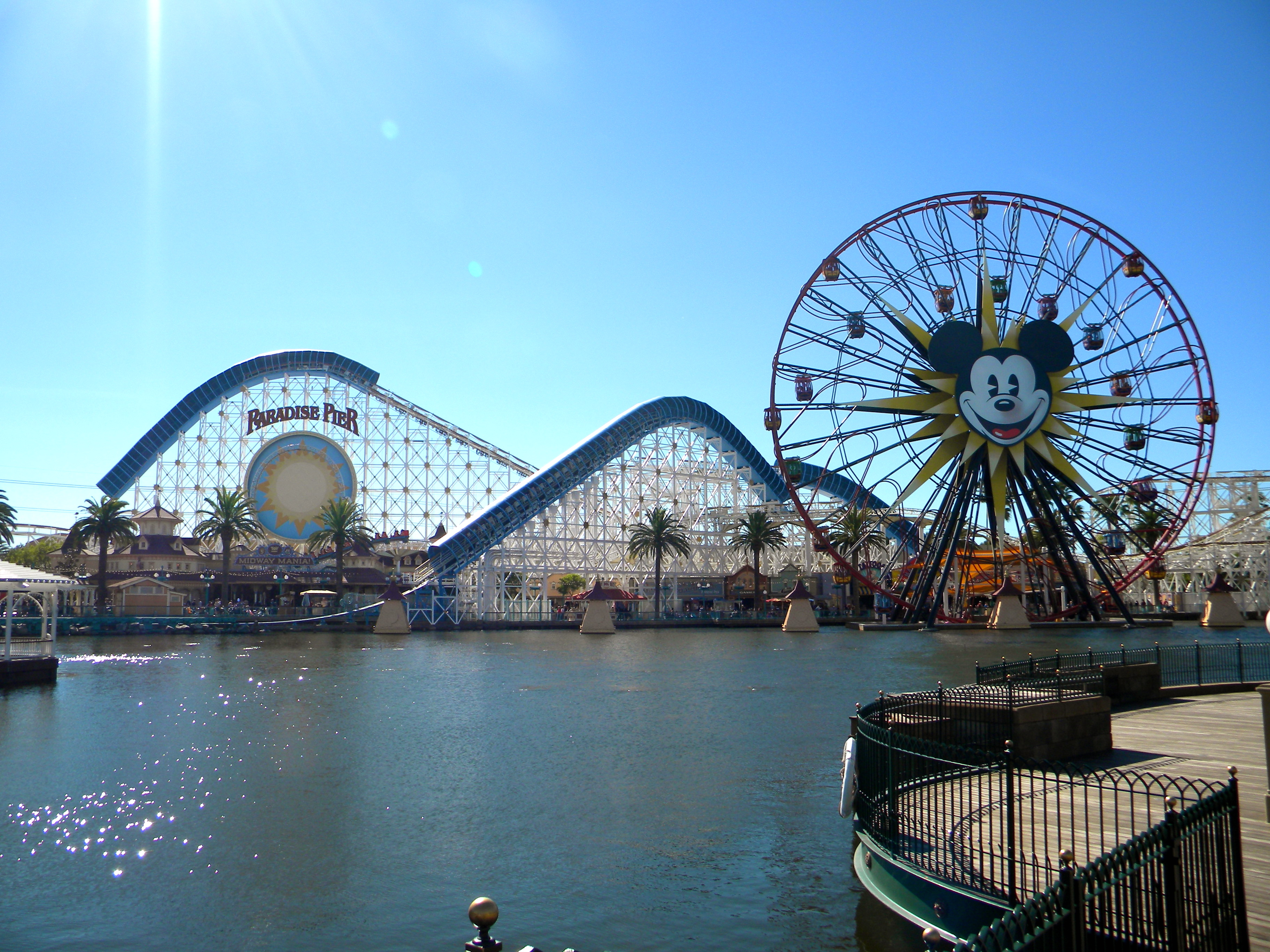
Overview of Paradise Pier with the Mickey Mouse head removed and the renovated Mickey's Fun Wheel

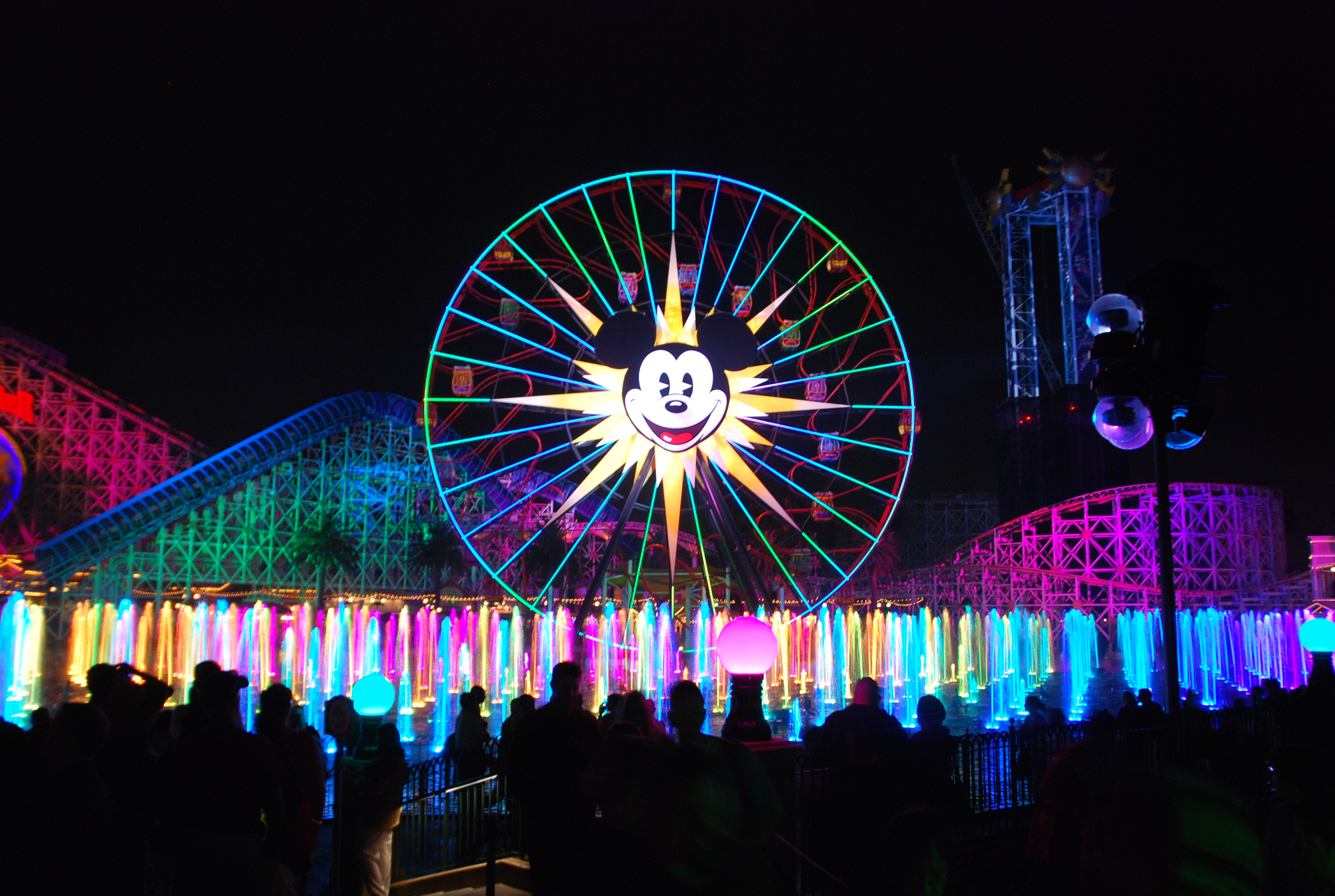
California Screamin' roller coaster during World of Color in 2010
