= Pixar Pier =

Themed land at the Disney California Adventure theme park

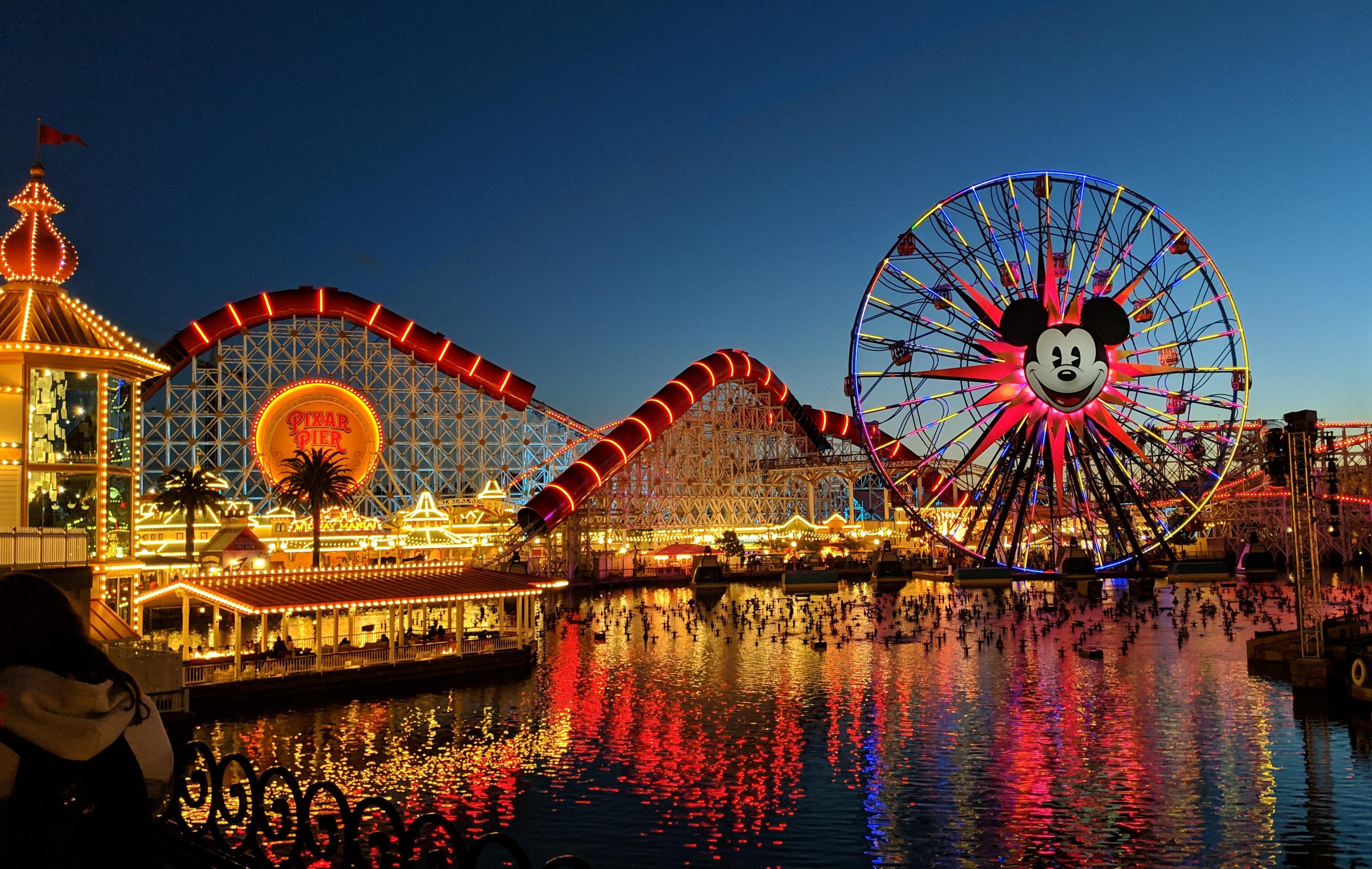
- Pixar Pier in 2019
- Interactive map of Pixar Pier
- Theme: A Victorian era seaside amusement park Pixar

Attractions
- Total: 5
- Roller coasters: 1
- Other rides: 4
- Shows: 1

Disney California Adventure
- Coordinates: 33°48′18″N 117°55′20″W
- Status: Operating
- Opened: February 8, 2001 (as Paradise Pier); June 23, 2018 (as Pixar Pier)
- Closed: June 22, 2018 (as Paradise Pier)

Pixar Pier is a themed land at Disney California Adventure, inspired by Victorian boardwalks that were once found along the coast of California. Despite its name and the presence of a nearby human-made lake, Pixar Pier is not actually a pier, but a waterside area of the park. Incredicoaster sprawls across much of the area, with various other attractions and forms of entertainment scattered around it.

The area opened as Paradise Pier in 2001 along with the rest of the theme park. A new attraction, Toy Story Midway Mania!, opened on June 17, 2008. The attraction was the first in a series of theming upgrades to the land and park as a whole. This was followed by changes to the Sun Wheel to become Mickey's Fun Wheel, removing the ears of the Mickey head behind California Screamin’s vertical loop, and new Games of the Boardwalk in 2009.

A portion of Paradise Pier was reimagined as Pixar Pier, which opened on June 23, 2018. The rest of the land was left largely unchanged and turned into its own land named Paradise Gardens Park.

== History ==
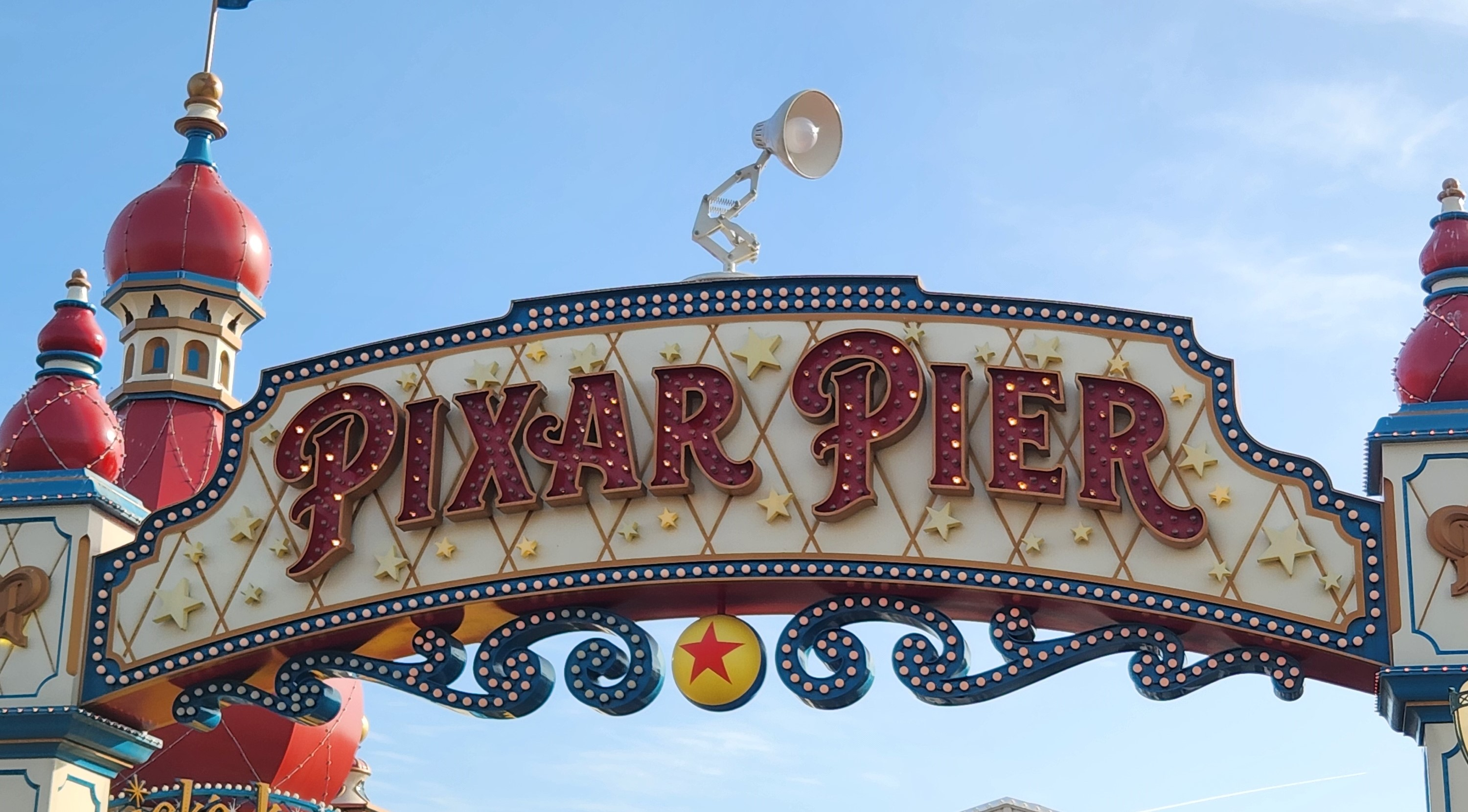
Pixar Pier marquee with an animatronic of Luxo Jr. on top.

When the park first opened in 2001, Paradise Pier originally resembled a modern seaside amusement park, similar to that of the Santa Monica Pier, Santa Cruz Boardwalk, or San Diego's Belmont Park. As part of the Disney California Adventure $1.1 billion expansion project, Paradise Pier was re-themed to a Victorian era seaside amusement parks of the 1920s.

The first change was the addition of Toy Story Midway Mania!, which opened on June 17, 2008. The boardwalk games were then re-themed to incorporate more familiar Disney characters (completed on April 7, 2009), and the Sun Wheel was transformed into Mickey's Fun Wheel with a new color scheme, new lighting effects, and a "pie-eyed" Mickey Mouse face replacing the original sun face (completed on May 4, 2009). Following these changes, the "Route 66" area was completely re-themed, with the "S.S. rustworthy", and "Dinosaur Jack's Sunglass Shack" being completely demolished. The Orange Stinger underwent extensive re-theming to become Silly Symphony Swings, based on Disney's 1935 short film The Band Concert. Silly Symphony Swings opened on May 28, 2010. Cosmetic changes were also made to California Screamin': the Mickey Mouse silhouette was altered to represent a sunburst pattern, with a large Paradise Pier sign hanging above the loop, and the scream tubes were also repainted a darker shade of blue.

On June 23, 2018, part of Paradise Pier would reopen as Pixar Pier, themed after films from Pixar Animation Studios. California Screamin' became the Incredicoaster, Mickey's Fun Wheel opened as the Pixar Pal-A-Round, with Pixar characters on its gondolas. The Luxo Jr. animatronic was installed on the top of Pixar Pier's marquee, four months later, in October. Jessie's Critter Carousel opened in 2019 taking the place of King Triton's Carousel of the Sea. The Maliboomer closed in 2010 and was unused garden space until it was replaced by the Inside Out Emotional Whirlwind attraction in 2019.

=== Attractions ===
- Games of Pixar Pier
- Jessie's Critter Carousel
- Inside Out Emotional Whirlwind
- Incredicoaster
- Pixar Pal-A-Round
- Toy Story Mania!

=== Future attractions ===
- Coco attraction

=== Restaurants ===
- Lamplight Lounge
- Jack-Jack Cookie Num Nums
- Poultry Palace
- Angry Dogs
- Adorable Snowman Frosted Treats
- Señor Buzz Churros

=== Shops ===
- Knick's Knacks
- Midway Mercantile
- Bing Bong's Sweet Stuff

=== Shows & Park Entertainment ===
- Operation: Playtime! - featuring the Green Army Patrol

== Retired features ==
=== Former attractions ===
- Disney's Electrical Parade: the second to last version of the Main Street Electrical Parade in the west coast which opened with Disney California Adventure in February 2001, and was shipped to Florida in 2010.
- Maliboomer: a "space shot" ride which shot rides up a 180-foot tower. The ride was closed and removed in 2010 and replaced with a park, as well as Inside Out Emotional Whirlwind.
- Sun Wheel: ferris wheel inspired by Coney Island's 1927 Wonder Wheel, which featured swinging and stationary gondolas and a large replica of a sun face in the center. The ride closed in October 2008 and reopened as Mickey's Fun Wheel on May 8, 2009. It was then re-themed to the Pixar Pal-A-Round in 2018.
- Rockin' The Bay Concert Series: a Series of concerts on Paradise Bay.
- Lilo & Stitch's Ohana Luau: a small show featuring Lilo and Stitch from the 2002 Disney animated film Lilo & Stitch.
- Rockin' California Screamin': in 2007, as a promotion for the park, "California Screamin'" was given a temporary new soundtrack by the Red Hot Chili Peppers.
- Original Games of the Boardwalk: the original consisted of 7 games. 3 of the games were later removed as part of the park's expansion.
- California Screamin': Closed on January 8, 2018, it reopened and re-themed as Incredicoaster on June 23, 2018.
- King Triton's Carousel of the Sea: Closed on March 5, 2018, it was replaced by Jessie's Critter Carousel in April 2019.

=== Former shops and restaurants ===
- Pizza Oom Mow Mow: renovated in 2011 and renamed "Boardwalk Pizza & Pasta".
- Malibu-Ritos: a counter service food location serving burritos. The restaurant closed permanently in 2001 only a few weeks after park opening, due to low park attendance and sat empty for several years. The empty location was permanently removed in 2006 to make way for "Toy Story Midway Mania!".
- Pacific Ocean Photos: a photography studio and shop selling photos of park guests. The store was demolished in 2006 to make way for "Toy Story Midway Mania!".
- Reboundo Beach: a "pay-per-play" game involving shooting basketballs into hoops. The game was removed in 2010 to allow construction of seating for the "Boardwalk Pizza & Pasta" restaurant.
- Boardwalk Betsy's Strips, Dips 'n' Chips: a counter service food location serving fried foods, located under the loop of "California Screamin'". The location was demolished in 2006 to make way for "Toy Story Midway Mania!", with the restaurant's menu being made available at Bountiful Valley Farm, before being permanently retired from the park in 2010.
- Paradise Pier Ice Cream Company (Originally Catch-A-Flave): a counter service ice cream location that closed in January 2018 and was replaced by Adorable Snowman Frosted Treats, inspired by Pixar's 2001 film Monsters, Inc..
