= Pixar Pal-A-Round =

Attraction at Disney California Adventure

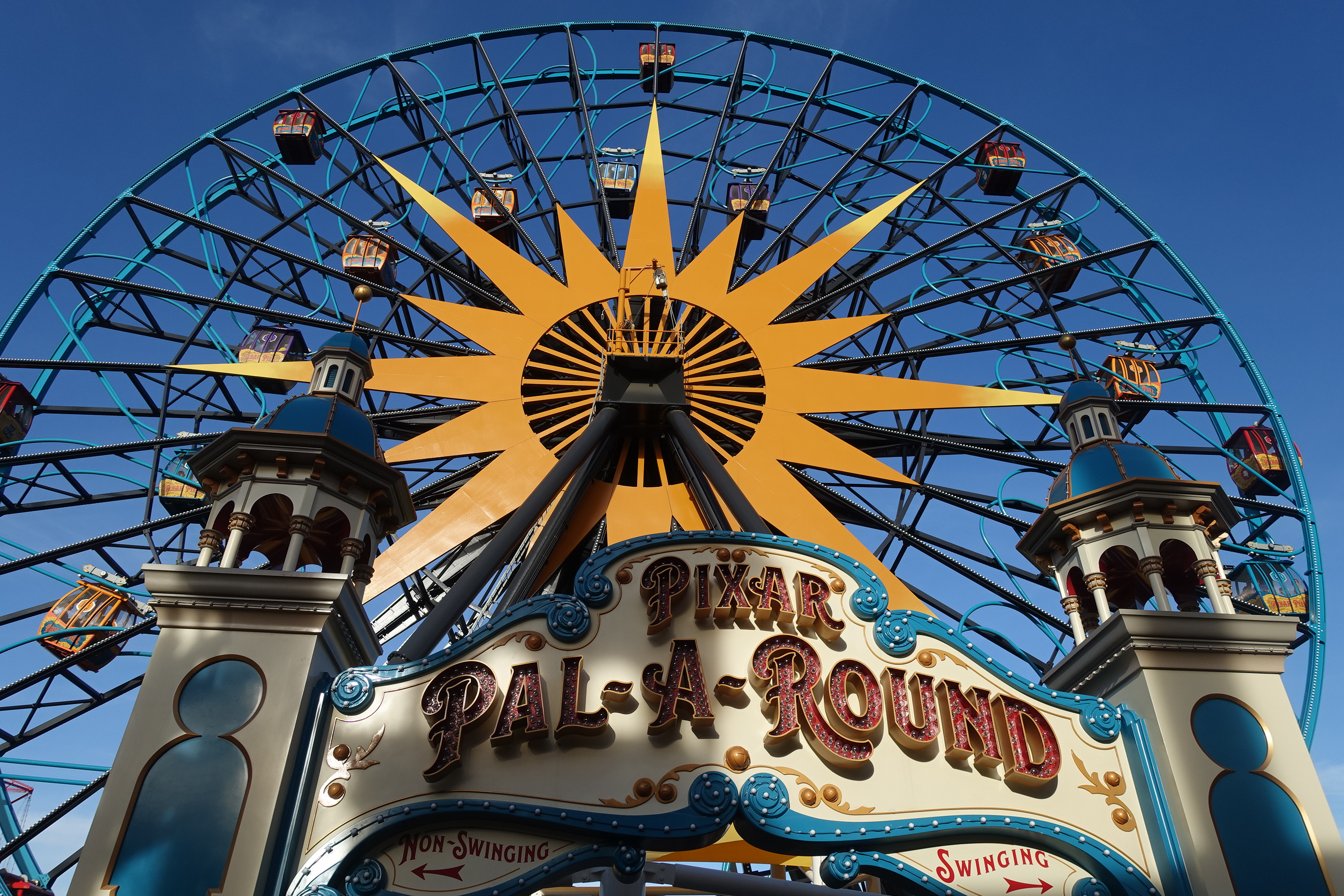
- Pixar Pal-A-Round in 2019

Disney California Adventure
- Area: Paradise Pier (2001–2018); Pixar Pier (2018–present)
- Coordinates: 33°48′18.39″N 117°55′19.87″W
- Status: Operating
- Opening date: June 23, 2018

Ride statistics
- Attraction type: Eccentric wheel
- Designer: Walt Disney Imagineering
- Theme: Boardwalk; Victorian; Pixar
- Height: 150 ft (46 m)
- Vehicle type: Gondola
- Riders per vehicle: 8
- Duration: 9 minutes
- Previously known as: Sun Wheel (2001–2008); Mickey's Fun Wheel (2009–2018)
- Wheelchair accessible

Pixar Pal-A-Round (formerly known as the Sun Wheel and Mickey's Fun Wheel) is a 150-foot-tall (46 m) eccentric wheel at Disney California Adventure, at the Disneyland Resort in Anaheim, California. The attraction opened to the public on February 8, 2001, at Paradise Pier as the Sun Wheel. Inspired by Wonder Wheel at Deno's Wonder Wheel Amusement Park, Coney Island, which also features both sliding and fixed gondolas, Pixar Pal-A-Round has a large pie-eyed Mickey Mouse face at its center.

From 2001 to 2008, the attraction featured a sun face on the front along with a yellow color scheme. In 2008, the attraction was rethemed as the Mickey's Fun Wheel, which opened on May 4, 2009. The sun was replaced with a Mickey Mouse face, and images of Mickey, Goofy, Donald Duck, Pluto, and Minnie Mouse were added to the gondolas. On November 2, 2017, Disney announced that the ride would be renovated, which would include Pixar characters on the gondolas, but with Mickey's face remaining on the side. On June 23, 2018, the attraction reopened as the Pixar Pal-A-Round.

== Description ==
Pixar Pal-A-Round is an eccentric wheel, differing from conventional Ferris wheels in that 16 of its 24 gondolas ride on interior rails so that they slide inward and outward as the wheel rotates. This results in a more intense experience, and motion sickness bags are provided in each gondola due to the disorienting nature of the ride. The other eight gondolas are fixed to the rim of the wheel and do not slide. Guests may choose to ride in sliding or fixed gondolas, each of which can carry eight people.

Pixar Pal-A-Round features a Mickey Mouse head, but with gondolas themed after Pixar films such as Finding Nemo, The Incredibles, Inside Out, and Coco. From 2009 to 2018, the stationary cars featured Mickey, while the sliding ones featured Goofy, Donald Duck, Pluto, and Minnie Mouse.

== History ==
=== Sun Wheel (2001–08) ===
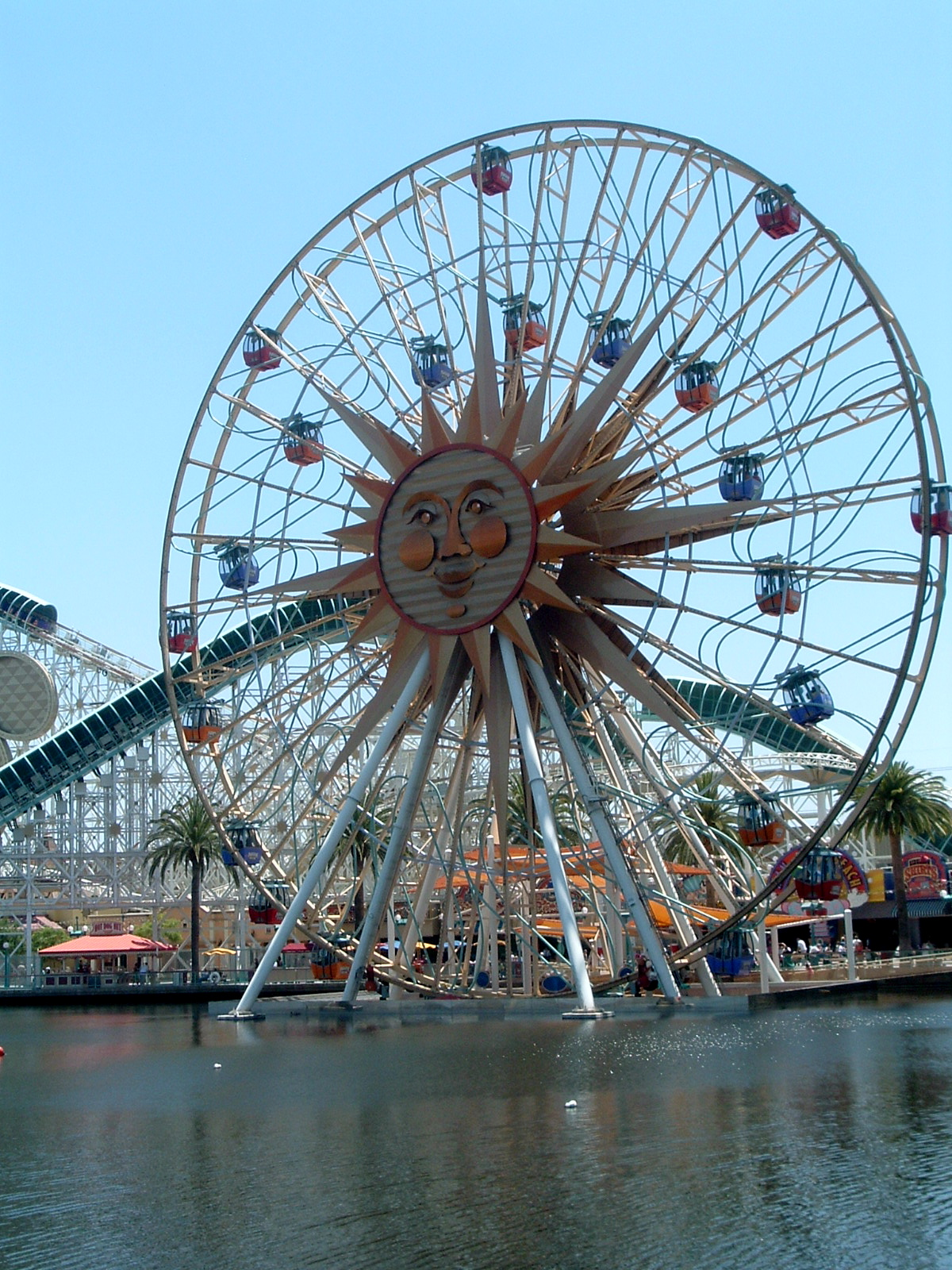
The former Sun Wheel at Disney's California Adventure Park

The attraction opened as the Sun Wheel on February 8, 2001, and was one of the park’s earliest attractions during opening day. It was modeled after Coney Island's 1920 Wonder Wheel, and featured a sun on the front side along with a yellow color scheme. The purple and orange cars rode on inside rails, which means that they were sliding towards the inside and outside as the ride revolved. The sun face was inspired by Mexican art from the 1970s. In October 2008, the Sun Wheel underwent renovation and was re-themed as the Mickey's Fun Wheel.

=== Mickey's Fun Wheel (2009–18) ===
The sun was replaced by a Mickey Mouse head and the color scheme was changed from yellow to red. The attraction re-opened on May 4, 2009, as the Mickey's Fun Wheel.

In 2013, lights were installed around the back of Mickey's Head for World of Color: Winter Dreams along with an LED lighting package that was installed on the California Screamin' roller coaster. Creative executive Steve Davison revealed during an interview after the premiere of Winter Dreams that the new lights installed on Fun Wheel and California Screamin' are a permanent addition and will be used in future World of Color updates.

==== Incident ====
On October 2, 2014, the ride malfunctioned, stranding riders for two hours before they were evacuated with no reported injuries.

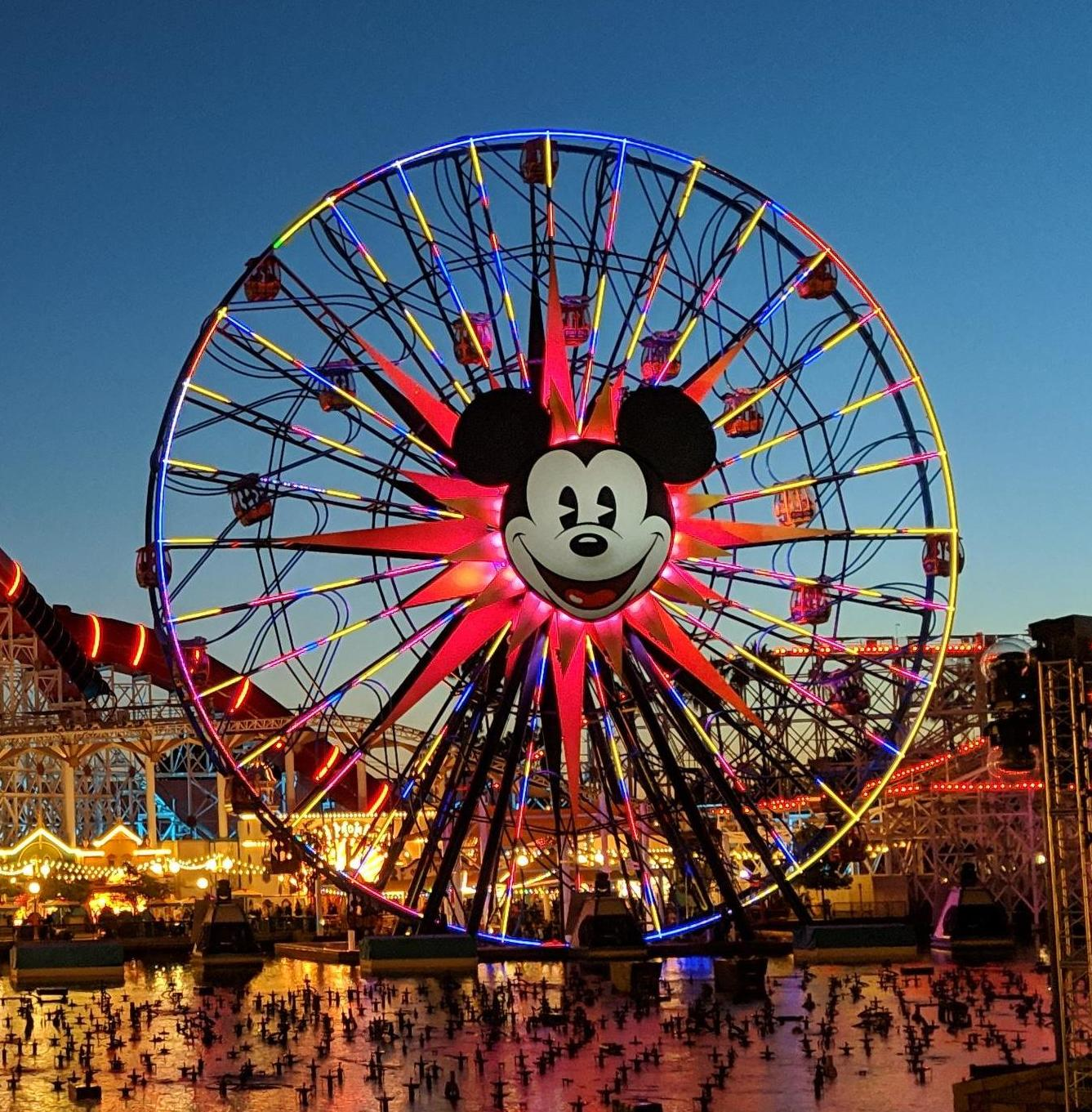
Pixar Pal-A-Round in 2019

=== Pixar Pal-A-Round (2018–present) ===
On November 2, 2017, Disney announced that Mickey's Fun Wheel would be updated to include Pixar characters on the gondolas with Mickey's face remaining on the side facing Paradise Bay. The attraction was closed on January 8, 2018, along with other Paradise Pier offerings, as the land transformed into Pixar Pier. On April 25, 2018, Disney announced that Mickey's Fun Wheel would be renamed "Pixar Pal-A-Round", to be consistent with the attraction's new theme. The color scheme was changed to light blue, and the gondolas received new images of characters from Pixar films, such as Joy & Sadness from Inside Out, Mr. Incredible & Elastigirl from The Incredibles, and Miguel & Héctor from Coco. The attraction officially opened on June 23, 2018.

On February 3, 2019, Pixar Pal-A-Round was lit up in blue and yellow for Super Bowl LIII, which featured the Los Angeles Rams and the New England Patriots.
