= George Wilkins (composer) =

American soundtrack composer (1934–2024)

- Born: George Edward Wilkins; March 1, 1934; Detroit, Michigan, U.S.
- Died: November 8, 2024 (aged 90) Paso Robles, California, U.S.
- Genres: Film score, contemporary classical music
- Occupations: Composer, arranger, producer
- Years active: 1964–2008

George Edward Wilkins (March 1, 1934 – November 8, 2024) was an American musician, arranger, and composer who was best known for his work with the Disney Parks.

== Life and career ==
George Edward Wilkins was born in Detroit, Michigan on March 1, 1934.

=== Early career ===
Wilkins' first foray into music was serving as a solo vocalist at the Cathedral Church of St. Paul in Detroit. Wilkins got his start in the music industry as a backup vocalist and vocal arranger for Patti Page during the 1950s. In the 1960s, he also co-founded the vocal group The Doodletown Pipers. By this time, Wilkins broke out as a composer for film and television with his work on the Rankin/Bass productions Return to Oz (1964) and The Wacky World of Mother Goose (1967).

=== Disney ===
In 1979, Wilkins joined Walt Disney Productions as a protégé to composer Norman "Buddy" Baker, and was tasked with writing the arrangements for the Listen to the Land and Kitchen Kabaret attractions at EPCOT, which was opening in three years, but was thrust into a composer role for the entire park after Baker was involved in a car accident. Wilkins then became music director for EPCOT in 1981 when Baker was called away to compose and conduct the score for The Fox and the Hound.

Wilkins arranged several versions of the song "It's Fun to Be Free", for the World of Motion attraction, and arranged the Journey into Imagination ride music. After several arrangement opportunities, Wilkins was finally tasked with lead composing duties on the Horizons pavilion, after Disney show development head Randy Bright had rejected the Sherman Brothers' compositions for the ride. Wilkins composed the pavilion's area loop, as well as all on-ride music and audio cues.

Throughout his time at Disney, Wilkins acted as both a "composer in residence" as well as director of music for Walt Disney Imagineering. Wilkins composed the music for the original song "We've Come So Far" for Space Mountain in 1984, as well as an instrumental arrangement for the attraction's queue, which remains installed in the attraction and can still be heard today. Wilkins was soon called back to work on EPCOT after being tasked with composing the soundscapes for the new Living Seas pavilion with Russell Brower. Wilkins also did all arrangements for the Kitchen Kabaret replacement Food Rocks, and composed all score and audio cues for Test Track in the late 1990s.

Wilkins' final project with Disney was writing arrangements for "it's a small world" at Hong Kong Disneyland, before retiring from the company around 2008.

=== Death ===
Wilkins died on November 8, 2024 in Paso Robles, California at age 90.

== Credits ==
=== Film and television ===
Year	Title	Notes
1964	Return to Oz	TV movie, additional music
1967	The Wacky World of Mother Goose	Film
1986–1987	The Adventures of Teddy Ruxpin	TV series

=== Disney Parks ===
Year	Title	Park	Notes
1982	Kitchen Kabaret	EPCOT	The Land attraction; queue and attraction arrangements
1982	Listen to the Land	EPCOT	The Land attraction; composed "Symphony of the Seed"
1982	World of Motion	EPCOT	Arranged interior queue and attraction
1982	ImageWorks	EPCOT	Imagination pavilion attraction; composed "Electronic Philhamonic"
1982	Magic Eye Theater	EPCOT	Imagination pavilion attraction; arranged "Makin' Memories"
1982	Universe of Energy	EPCOT	Composed Exxon logo music and arranged attraction finale
1982	Entrance plaza	EPCOT	Arranged "Golden Dream" for the park's entrance plaza area music medley
1982	EPCOT Electronic Forum	EPCOT	CommuniCore atttraction; composed theme
1983	Journey into Imagination	EPCOT	Arranged exterior and interior background music and attraction music
1983	Meet the World	Tokyo Disneyland	Arranged queue music
1983	Horizons	EPCOT	Composed ride soundtrack, area loop, queue music, and post-show
1984	Space Mountain	Magic Kingdom Park	Composed queue music, "Star Tunnel," and "We’ve Come So Far"
1984	All Because Man Wanted to Fly	Disneyland Park	Short film shown prior to the World Premiere Circle-Vision film American Journeys; composer
1984	Backstage Magic	EPCOT	CommuniCore attraction; composer
1984	Country Bear Christmas Special	Disneyland and Magic Kingdom	Arranger
1986	The Living Seas	EPCOT	Composed both attraction main theme and “Suited for the Sea” film with Russell Brower
1986	Country Bear Vacation Hoedown	Disneyland and Magic Kingdom	Arranger
1989	Goofy About Health	EPCOT	Wonders of Life attraction; composer
1989	The Great Movie Ride	Disney's Hollywood Studios	Arranger
1989	Pan Galactic Pizza Port	Tokyo Disneyland	Composer (lyrics by Kevin Rafferty)
1991	Jim Henson's Muppet*Vision 3D	Disney's Hollywood Studios	Queue music arranger
1992	Walt's Restaurant	Disneyland Paris	Arranger
1992	Silver Spur Restaurant	Disneyland Paris	Arranger
1992	Le Pays des Contes de Fees	Disneyland Paris	Arranger
1992	The American Adventure	EPCOT	Composed and arranged the 1992 revision of "Golden Dream"
1993	Living with the Land	EPCOT	The Land attraction; composer
1993	Carousel of Progress	Magic Kingdom	Arranger for 1993 revision
1994	Roger Rabbit's Car Toon Spin	Disneyland	Arranger
1994	Food Rocks	EPCOT	The Land attraction; attraction soundtrack producer
1994	Sonny Eclipse	Magic Kingdom	Audio-Animatronic figure located at Cosmic Ray's Starlight Cafe; Composer (lyrics by Kal David and Kevin Rafferty)
1994	WACKY Radio Show	Disneyland	Mickey's Toontown area music; composer
1998	The Enchanted Tiki Room (Under New Management)	Magic Kingdom	Arranger
1998	It's Tough to Be a Bug!	Disney's Animal Kingdom Theme Park	Composer
1998	Buzz Lightyear's Space Ranger Spin	Magic Kingdom	Composer
1999	Test Track	EPCOT	Queue medley composer
2000	Pooh's Hunny Hunt	Tokyo Disneyland	Arranger
2001	Paradise Pier	Disney California Adventure Park	Area music arranger
2001	California Screamin'	Disney California Adventure	Composer (with Gary Hoey)
2001	Superstar Limo	Disney California Adventure	Composer
2001	Mediterranean Harbor	Tokyo DisneySea	Area music arranger
2002	Journey Into Imagination with Figment	EPCOT	Composer
2005	Buzz Lightyear Astro Blasters	Disneyland	Arranger
2008	"it's a small world"	Hong Kong Disneyland	Arranger
