= Soarin' =

Flight motion simulator at Disney parks

Soarin’'

Disney California Adventure
- Name: Soarin' Across America
- Area: Grizzly Peak
- Coordinates: 33.80837°N 117.92000°W
- Status: Operating
- Opening date: February 8, 2001
- Lightning Lane Available
- Single rider line Available

Epcot
- Name: Soarin' Across America
- Area: The Land
- Coordinates: 28°22′21.66″N 81°33′9.43″W
- Status: Operating
- Opening date: May 5, 2005
- Replaced: Kitchen Kabaret & Food Rocks
- Lightning Lane Available

Shanghai Disneyland
- Name: Soaring Over the Horizon 翱翔•飞越地平线
- Area: Adventure Isle
- Status: Operating
- Opening date: June 16, 2016
- Disney Premier Access Available

Tokyo DisneySea
- Name: Soaring: Fantastic Flight
- Area: Mediterranean Harbor
- Status: Operating
- Opening date: July 23, 2019
- Disney Premier Access Available

Ride statistics
- Attraction type: Flying Theater simulator ride
- Manufacturer: Dynamic Structures
- Designer: Walt Disney Imagineering
- Theme: Flight
- Music: Bruce Broughton, based on a score by Jerry Goldsmith
- Height: 80 ft (24 m)
- Vehicle type: Hang glider simulator / flying theater
- Vehicles: 6 in two theaters (California, Shanghai); 9 in three theaters (Florida) (formerly 6 until 2016)
- Riders per vehicle: Alpha 27, Bravo 33, Charlie 27
- Rows: 3
- Participants per group: 87 per theater
- Duration: 4:51
- Height restriction: 40 in (102 cm)
- Host: Patrick Warburton (California, Florida)
- Sponsor: Nestlé (Florida; 2005–2009); UnionPay (Shanghai); SHINRYO (Tokyo)
- Must transfer from wheelchair
- Closed captioning available

Soarin' is a flight motion simulator attraction and film at Disney California Adventure, Epcot, Shanghai Disneyland, and Tokyo DisneySea; the attraction is known under various names, varying by park. (Note: Various titles for the Soarin' films include Soarin' (Epcot – California Version, 2005–2016), Soarin' Over California (California Adventure (2001–2016 & 2019–Present) and Epcot (2023–2024) – California Version), Soarin' Around the World, Soaring Over the Horizon, Soaring: Fantastic Flight (California Adventure and Epcot (2016–Present), Shanghai (2016–Present), and Tokyo DisneySea (2019–Present), respectively – Global Version), and Soarin' Across America (Epcot and California Adventure – American Version, 2026).) It employs a mechanical lift system, a projected presentation on an 80 ft (24 m) concave 180-degree dome screen, and artificial scents and wind to simulate a hang gliding flight over locations in six of the world's continents. Many consider it the first flying theater.

The original ride, Soarin' Over California, was an opening day attraction at Disney California Adventure on February 8, 2001. It took guests over several locations in California and included a pre-show on the history of California's aviation industry. The ride opened at Epcot in 2005, with the name shortened to Soarin'.

A new film was developed for the Shanghai Disneyland resort, debuting as Soaring Over the Horizon on June 16, 2016. This film features landmarks and landscapes from around the world. The Disneyland and Walt Disney World versions were also replaced with the film the following day, titled as Soarin' Around the World. On July 23, 2019, the film at the Tokyo Disneyland Resort as Soaring: Fantastic Flight.

After an initial limited return engagement during the summer of 2019, the original Soarin' Over California has returned to Disney California Adventure annually as part of the park's Food & Wine Festival during the spring season.

A third film, Soarin' Across America, has been announced for Disney's celebration of the United States Semiquincentennial at the California and Florida locations in Summer 2026. The EPCOT version debuted on May 26, 2026, and the Disneyland version debuted on July 2, 2026.

== Ride design ==
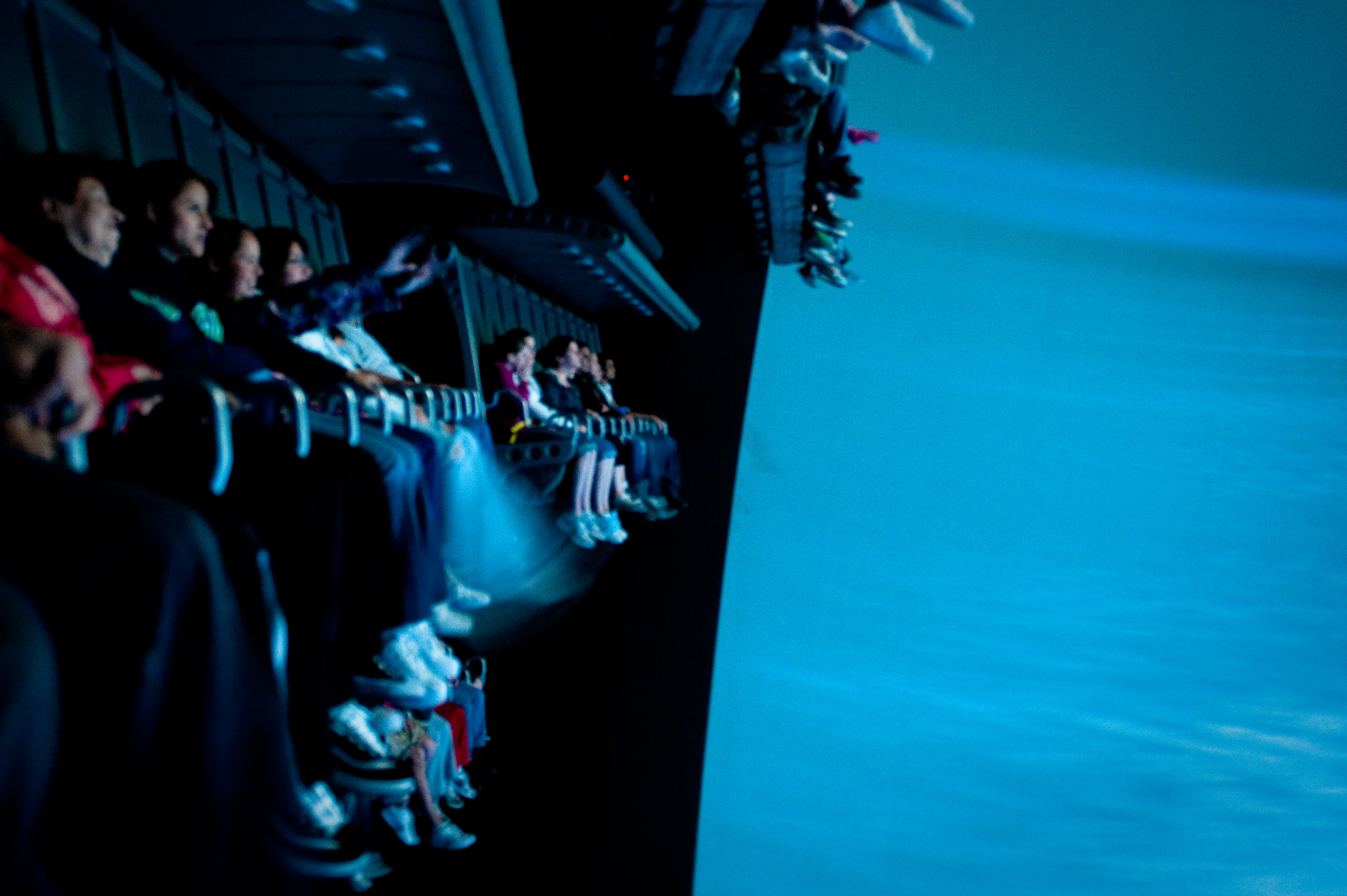
Three rows of seating for the ride

Soarin' was first conceptualized in 1996 as Ultra Flight, a name that can still be seen on the tower consoles of the California Adventure attraction. It was to feature an OMNIMAX screen with an inverted track, allowing guests to fly over California's landmarks. It was to have three load levels, with a system operating on a horizontal cable, much like a dry cleaner's rack. The plan was abandoned when it was determined that the design's construction and labor costs would be prohibitive. It seemed that Soarin' wouldn't become a reality until engineer Mark Sumner developed a different idea for the ride vehicles, using an Erector Set and string to create a working model. The new design allowed Disney to efficiently load guests on one level instead of three, significantly cutting its building costs.

Each ride vehicle consists of three rows of seats under a wing-like canopy, with a capacity of 87 guests. After guests have been safely restrained in the vehicle with standard lap belts, the canopy descends slightly and a cantilever system lifts the chairs forward and into the air with the guests' feet dangling freely. The vehicle is lifted forward so that guests look into a large, concave movie screen onto which aerial views are projected. The original film's scenes were shot at an IMAX HD frame rate of 48 frames per second, twice the conventional rate of regular films. The vehicle is moved forward toward the center of the dome so guests can see only the projected images and experience the sensation of flight. The ride structure contains about one million pounds (454,000 kg) of steel; 37 tons (33.5 metric tonnes) are lifted during each ride cycle.

To enhance the illusion, subtle vertical movements of the seats are synchronized to the film. Sensations of horizontal motion are created with a combination of vertical carriage movement and turning the image on the screen. Scents complementing the scenes are also injected into the air streams blowing on riders. When it opened, the scent was only present during the Redwood Creek scene and the Valencia Orange Farms scene. In the updated film, scents include rose blossoms in the Taj Mahal scene, grass in the Africa scene, and a sea breeze in the South Pacific scene.

== Versions ==
=== Disney California Adventure ===
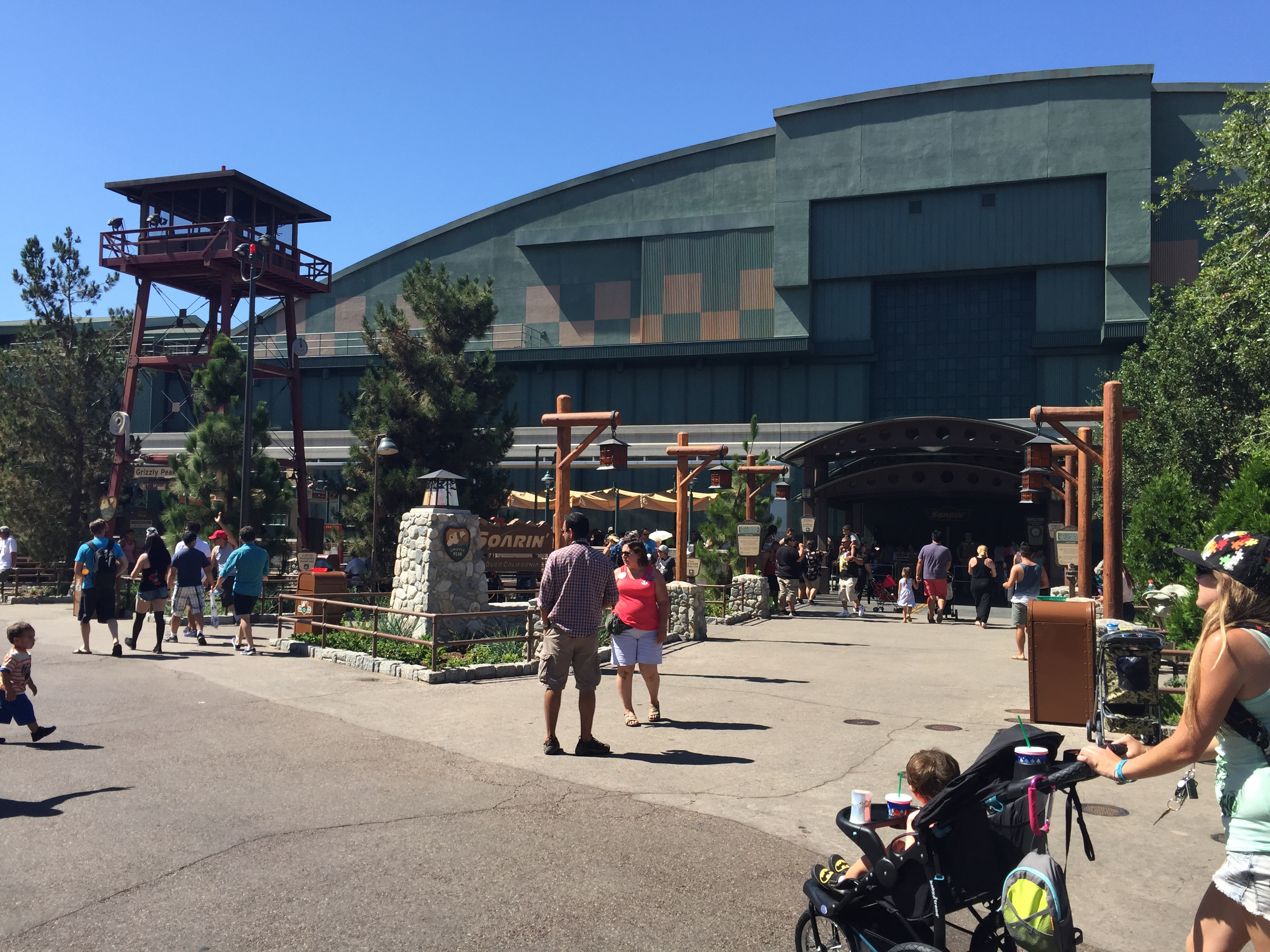
Soarin' Over California at Disney California Adventure

Soarin' Around the World is in the Grizzly Peak Airfield section of Disney California Adventure at the Disneyland Resort. One of the resort's most popular attractions, it utilizes the park's Lightning Lane Multi-Pass system, allowing guests to reserve specific ride times to avoid long queues.

While in line, guests pass the Wings of Fame, an homage to California's aviation history, including profiles of the P-51 Mustang, SR-71 Blackbird, and Bell X-1. There is also a section dedicated to aviators such as John J. Montgomery, Amelia Earhart, Jimmy Doolittle, Charles Lindbergh, Jack Northrop, the Wright brothers, Howard Hughes, Jacqueline Cochran, Kelly Johnson, Paul MacCready, and Chuck Yeager. Inspirational music from a variety of aviation-related films is played in the queue areas, including Patton, MacArthur, Air Force One, The Blue Max, Explorers (all by Jerry Goldsmith), The American President (by Marc Shaiman), Dragonheart, Dragon: The Bruce Lee Story, Angels in the Outfield (1994) (both by Randy Edelman), The Last Starfighter (by Craig Safan), Apollo 13, and The Rocketeer (both by James Horner), Always (by John Williams) and the HBO miniseries Band of Brothers (by Michael Kamen). The Air Force Song and "Jupiter" from Gustav Holst's orchestral suite The Planets are also heard, based on their use in The Right Stuff.

Before entering the theater area, guests are placed in one of three preshow areas, called Alpha Gate, Bravo Gate, and Charlie Gate (named for the first three letters of the NATO phonetic alphabet). Just before boarding, guests see a pre-boarding video hosted by their chief flight attendant, Patrick Warburton.

The attraction opened with the park in 2001 as Soarin' Over California in what was then the park's Condor Flats area. In early 2015, it closed for refurbishment as the surrounding area was transformed into Grizzly Peak Airfield. It reopened on May 15, 2015, with new exterior theming and updates to its screen and projection system. It now utilizes a laser illuminated digital projection array, replacing its original IMAX systems. Several exterior changes include the replacement of the mock-up RS-25 rocket engine with a fire lookout tower.

From January to March 2016, the attraction intermittently operated as Soarin' Over California to prepare for the introduction of the Soarin' Around the World ride film. The original film was shown until June 16, when the attraction was closed to prepare for the new film's debut on June 17.

Since Soarin' Around the World's opening on June 17, 2016, visitors to Disney California Adventure are usually able to find Soarin' Around the World' playing. However, on various occasions, Disney has brought back the original Soarin' Over California for return engagements.

The first was on May 23, 2019, Disney announced that Soarin' Over California would temporarily return to the park for the month of June, following the opening of Star Wars: Galaxy's Edge at Disneyland Park on May 31. On June 21, they announced that the limited return had been extended to August 31, 2019, due to popular demand.

On February 28, 2020, the California version of the ride returned to California Adventure for the Disney California Adventure Food & Wine Festival. The limited engagement was scheduled to run through April 21, but ended prematurely when the resort began its extended closure on March 13 in response to the COVID-19 pandemic and two stay-at-home orders issued by California Governor Gavin Newsom. When the resort reopened on April 30, 2021, "Soarin' Around the World" was being shown. The following year, the California version began its annual temporary return for the duration of the Food & Wine Festival.

On December 2, 2025, it was announced that Soarin' Across America will premiere on July 2, 2026 at Disney California Adventure.

In celebration of the 25th anniversary of Disney California Adventure, it was announced that Soarin' Over California would return from February 6, 2026 until July 1, 2026. However, at the same time, it was announced that Soarin' Over California and Soarin' Around the World will be closed starting on June 30, 2026.

=== Epcot ===
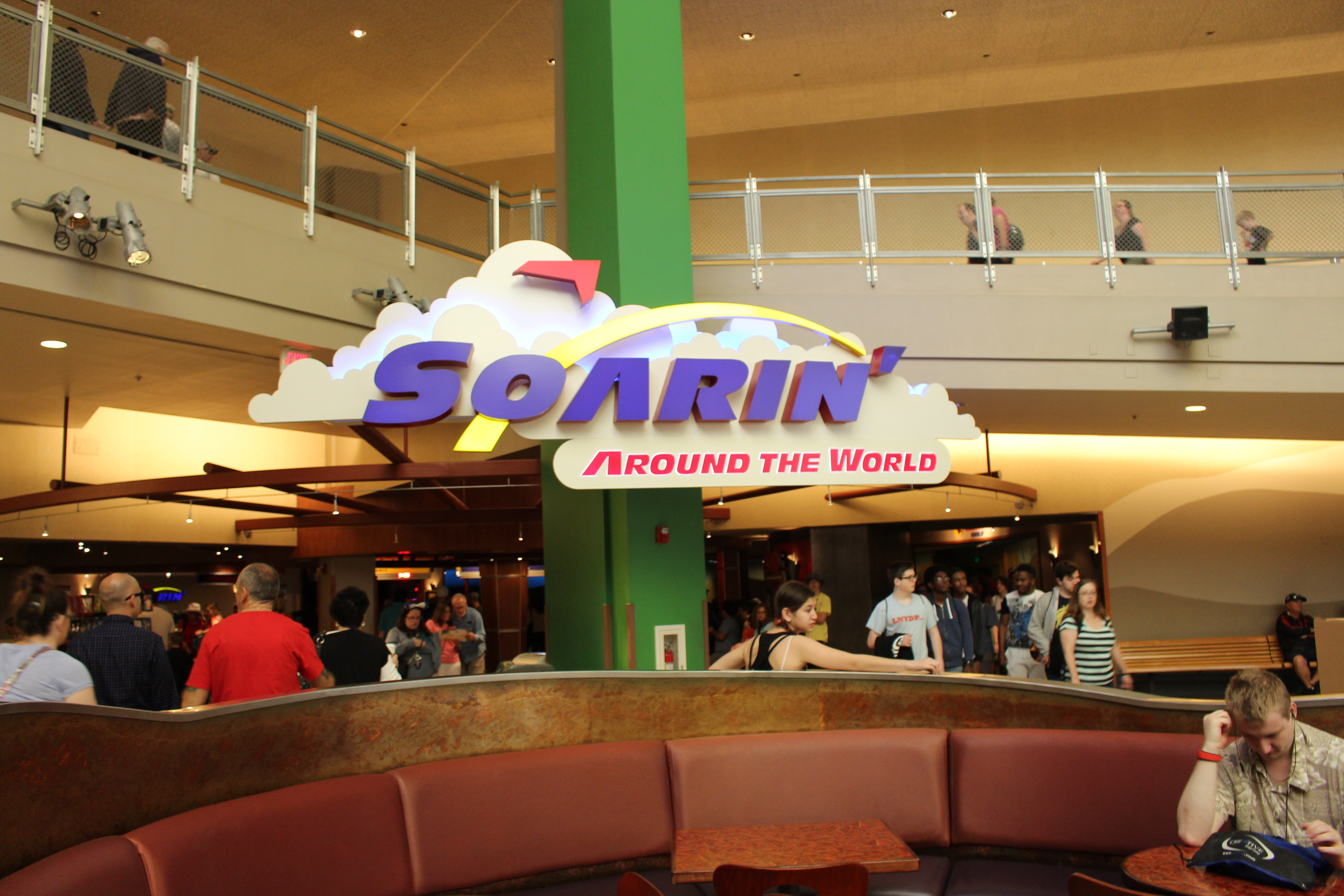
Entrance for Epcot's Soarin' within The Land pavilion.

The attraction was duplicated, simply as Soarin', and officially opened inside "The Land" pavilion at Epcot in Walt Disney World on May 5, 2005, along with Lights, Motors, Action!: Extreme Stunt Show at Disney's Hollywood Studios as part of the Happiest Celebration on Earth festival. Unlike the Disney California Adventure version, the show had guests taking flights to California. The concept was reinforced with theming of guests being loaded into "gates", with airport-themed spiels referring to "Flight 5505", an homage to the attraction's opening day. Cast members wear costumes resembling flight attendant uniforms, whereas the California version wear airfield crew uniforms.

The Epcot queue originally had pictures of natural wonders from around the world, not just California. It utilized a new infrared technology that allows guests to participate in interactive games. In 2009, this interactive technology appeared in the Magic Kingdom as part of a seven-month overhaul of Space Mountain. These interactive games were replaced with the Soarin' Challenge, a team-based game of trivia with questions pertaining to geography, landmarks, and cultures. Guests utilize displays throughout the queue and the companion Play Disney Parks smartphone app to join one of four colored teams (red, purple, yellow, and green) and help their team achieve the highest score by answering questions correctly and quickly.

The attraction closed for refurbishment on January 4, 2016, and was originally slated to reopen on June 17, with a third theater to coincide with the release of the new Soarin' Around the World film. The ride reopened with the original film on May 27, and the change to the new film occurred on June 17, 2016.

Disney announced that Soarin' Over California would temporarily return to the park on September 22, 2023, as part of Disney's 100 Years of Wonder celebration. This return run ended February 27, 2024 and Soarin' Around the World returned.

The film ends with a flyover of Epcot. In the original 2016 version, this included the Fountain of Nations, Innoventions, and Spaceship Earth. After a redesign of Future World that was completed in 2024, the film was updated to include the redesigned World Celebration area. The updated ending premiered on November 20, 2024. The new ending also fixed the Eiffel Tower scene, which had become popular due to the way the tower distorted as the camera flew over it. The version, which stays farther away from the tower, has less distortion.

A new film, Soarin' Across America, premiered on May 26, 2026. The new film is part of Disney's celebration of the United States Semiquincentennial. At the same time, it was announced Soarin' Around the World would closed on May 14.

=== Shanghai Disneyland ===
The attraction was retooled as Soaring Over the Horizon for Shanghai Disneyland. It was not part of the park's original plan, but was added to it after Walt Disney Imagineering began developing similar attractions for the U.S. parks. Located in the park's Adventure Isle area, it opened with the park on June 16, 2016.

Embedded in the Adventure Isle setting, the attraction is presented as an ancient observatory and temple to Q'otar, the Arbori tribe's Condor god. The preshow and safety spiel are hosted by a shaman of the tribe who grants guests the ability of flight, but has trouble controlling her own shapeshifting abilities.

On September 23, 2025, it was announced that an expansion plans for the attraction, including new finale scene and more, in Adventure Isle at Shanghai Disneyland.

=== Tokyo DisneySea ===
On April 27, 2016, Tokyo Disney Resort announced a number of coming attractions for Tokyo Disneyland and Tokyo DisneySea parks, including a proposed version of Soarin' (titled Soaring: Fantastic Flight) to be in the Mediterranean Harbor section of Tokyo DisneySea. The announcement said this version would have a different theme, with ride vehicles designed as Renaissance-era Dream Flyers created by aviator and Society of Explorers and Adventurers member Camellia Falco. It opened on July 23, 2019.

In this version of the attraction, rather than an aviation terminal, it is set in the Museum of Fantastic Flight, which is hosting a retrospective on the life of Camellia Falco. Her spirit takes guests to see some of her Dream Flyer gliders, and invites them on a flight of fantasy around the world. (Falco's name was first seen by guests at Disneyland's Tropical Hideaway restaurant as one of the names on a series of oars belonging to members of the Society.)

Two other differences can be seen in this version of the film: the Paris scene is replaced with Tokyo at sunset, with Mount Fuji in the background; and the finale is a flight over Tokyo DisneySea.

== Ride films ==
=== Soarin' Over California ===
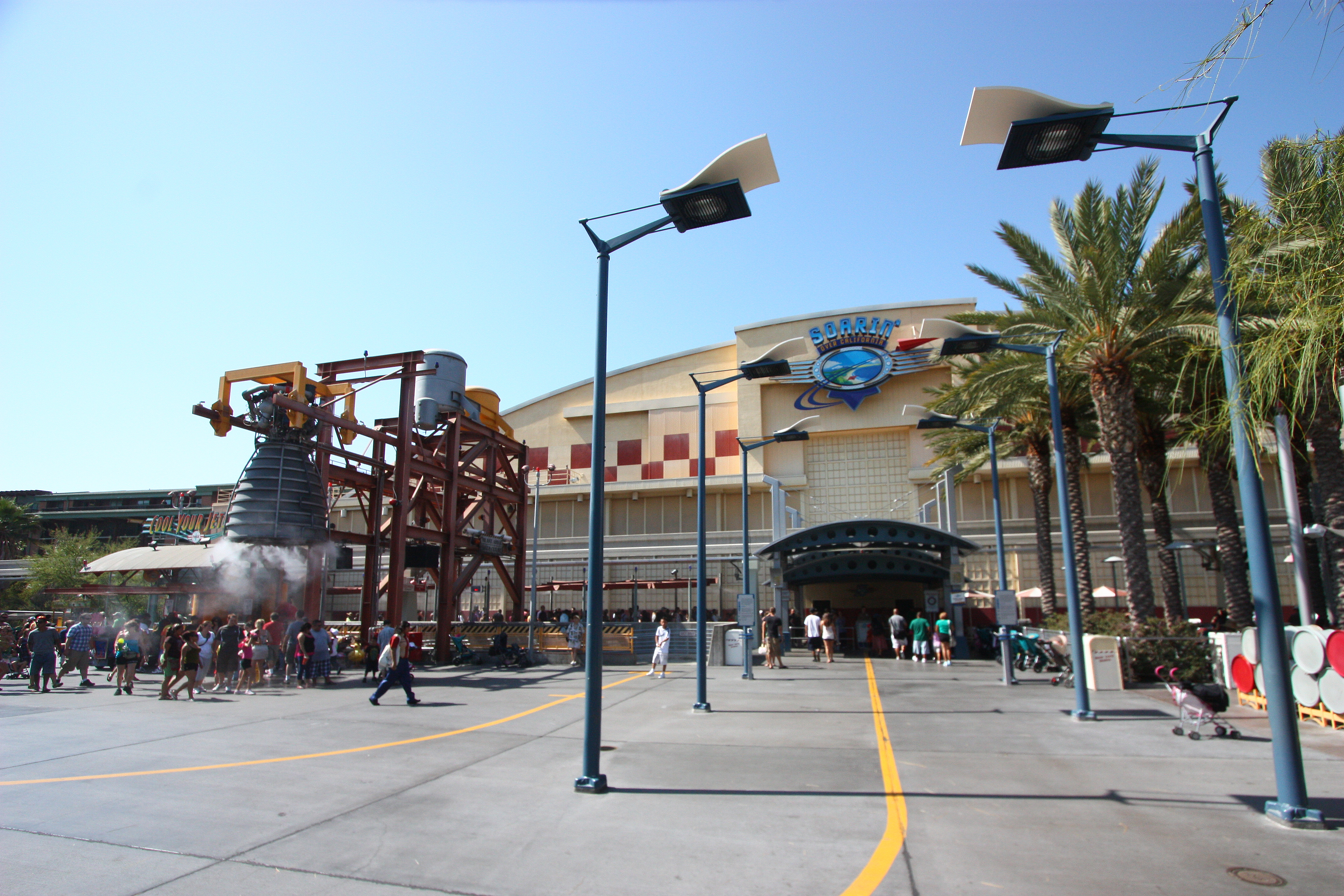
Soarin' Over California exterior as it appeared from 2001 to 2014 at Disney California Adventure

The original ride film, which lasts four minutes and 51 seconds, takes guests on a simulated hang-glider tour of California. Appropriate scents (citrus, pine, sagebrush, ocean mist) fill the air as the ride vehicles move gently to simulate the sensations of flight. In addition to the state's various landscapes, it also highlights its diverse recreation, including snow skiing, river rafting, kayaking, golf, horseback riding, hot air ballooning, surfing, and hang gliding. Its locations are:

- Golden Gate Bridge in San Francisco and Marin County
- Redwood Creek in Humboldt County
- Napa Valley
- Monterey Bay Sanctuary
- Lake Tahoe and Heavenly Mountain Resort
- Yosemite Falls and Half Dome, Yosemite National Park
- PGA West Palmer Course in La Quinta (credited in the queue as Palm Springs)
- Valencia orange groves of Camarillo
- Anza-Borrego Desert State Park of Imperial County
- USS John C. Stennis (CVN-74) at Coronado's Naval Air Station North Island near San Diego
- Malibu Beach at sunset
- Downtown Los Angeles at night
- Disneyland Resort in Anaheim, featuring Tinker Bell, and ending with fireworks

The original Soarin' Over California ride film at both Disney California Adventure and Epcot has an orchestral score by Jerry Goldsmith, who is said to have come down from his first ride in tears. In addition to finding it visually beautiful and magical, he said that his father was a pilot who loved all things Californian. "I'd do anything to be part of this project," Goldsmith said. "I'd even score the film for free." His soundtrack plays during the entire attraction, starting with a crescendo in the low strings while the screen is still dark. Numerous variations of a serene theme for horn and strings are heard, and several statements of a fanfare accompany the grandest vistas. The original ride score was included on Disneyland Resort and Walt Disney World official albums, including Walt Disney Records The Legacy Collection: Disneyland. It continues to be heard as ambient music in the Disneyland Resort Esplanade and Epcot's entrance plaza.

=== Soaring Over the Horizon, Soarin' Around the World, and Soaring: Fantastic Flight ===
An updated version of the Soarin' attraction debuted at the Adventure Isle section of Shanghai Disneyland Park as Soaring Over the Horizon on June 16, 2016. On August 15, 2015, at the D23 Expo, it was announced that the attractions at Epcot and Disney California Adventure would debut versions of the new Soaring Over the Horizon ride film, titled Soarin' Around the World, featuring locations, landscapes and landmarks across six continents. Unlike the original film, the updated version heavily utilizes computer-generated imagery (CGI), including CGI-animated transitions between scenes, such as close encounters with a seaplane, a kite, and an eagle. The updated attractions opened on June 17, 2016, at Disney California Adventure and Epcot, along with a third theater for the latter location. The film's locations are:

- Matterhorn in Switzerland and Italy
- Isfjord, Greenland
- Port Jackson in Sydney, Australia
- Neuschwanstein Castle in Bavaria, Germany
- Kilimanjaro National Park and Mount Kilimanjaro in Tanzania
- The Great Wall of China in China
- The Great Pyramids in Egypt
- Taj Mahal in Uttar Pradesh, India
- West and East Mitten Buttes in Monument Valley, Arizona, United States
- Lau Islands, Fiji
- Iguazu Falls in Brazil and Argentina
- Eiffel Tower in Paris, France (Shanghai Disneyland version, Disney California Adventure version, Epcot version); Tokyo Tower in Tokyo (Tokyo DisneySea version)
- Lujiazui CBD, Shanghai, China (Shanghai Disneyland version)→Shanghai Disneyland (Shanghai Disneyland future version); Disneyland, California, United States (Disney California Adventure version); Epcot, Florida, United States (Epcot version); Tokyo DisneySea, Chiba (Tokyo DisneySea version) also featuring Tinker Bell and ending with fireworks.

Soarin' Around the World and Soaring Over the Horizon received a new score by Bruce Broughton, heavily based on Goldsmith's original score, and performed by the London Studio Orchestra.

With the exception of Shanghai Disneyland, the final scene in all versions of Soarin' Around the World is the resort at which the ride is based; Shanghai Disneyland's does not include a resort flyover because the park was under construction during filming.

=== Soarin' Across America ===
Logo of Soarin' Across America.

Soarin' Across America is a limited-run show to celebrate the United States Semiquincentennial as part of the Disney Celebrates America commemoration. The show opened on May 26, 2026 at EPCOT, Walt Disney World and opened at Disney California Adventure on July 2, 2026. This show will have musical accompaniment by Bruce Broughton and feature recurring pre-show narrator Patrick Warburton. The film's locations are:

- Kennedy Space Center in Cape Canaveral, Florida, synced to an Artemis rocket launch
- Statue of Liberty and New York Harbor in New York City
- Portland Head Light in Cape Elizabeth, Maine
- National Mall and Washington Monument in Washington D.C.
- Bayous in Louisiana
- Branson Scenic Railway and Ozark Mountains in Missouri
- Mount Rushmore, Black Hills, South Dakota
- The Great Plains of Texas
- Grand Canyon West and Colorado River in Arizona
- Mount McKinley, in Denali National Park, in Alaska
- Diamond Head and Waikīkī in Honolulu, Hawaii
- Griffith Observatory, Mount Lee, Hollywood Sign, and Burbank in Greater Los Angeles, California
- Disneyland, California, United States (Disney California Adventure version); Epcot, Florida, United States (Epcot version)

== See also ==
- List of Disney California Adventure attractions
- List of Epcot attractions
