= The Land (Epcot) =

Pavilion at Epcot

- The pavilion logo (top), a throwback to the original 1982 pavilion logo, introduced in 2019 for Epcot signage The logotype used since the mid-2000s

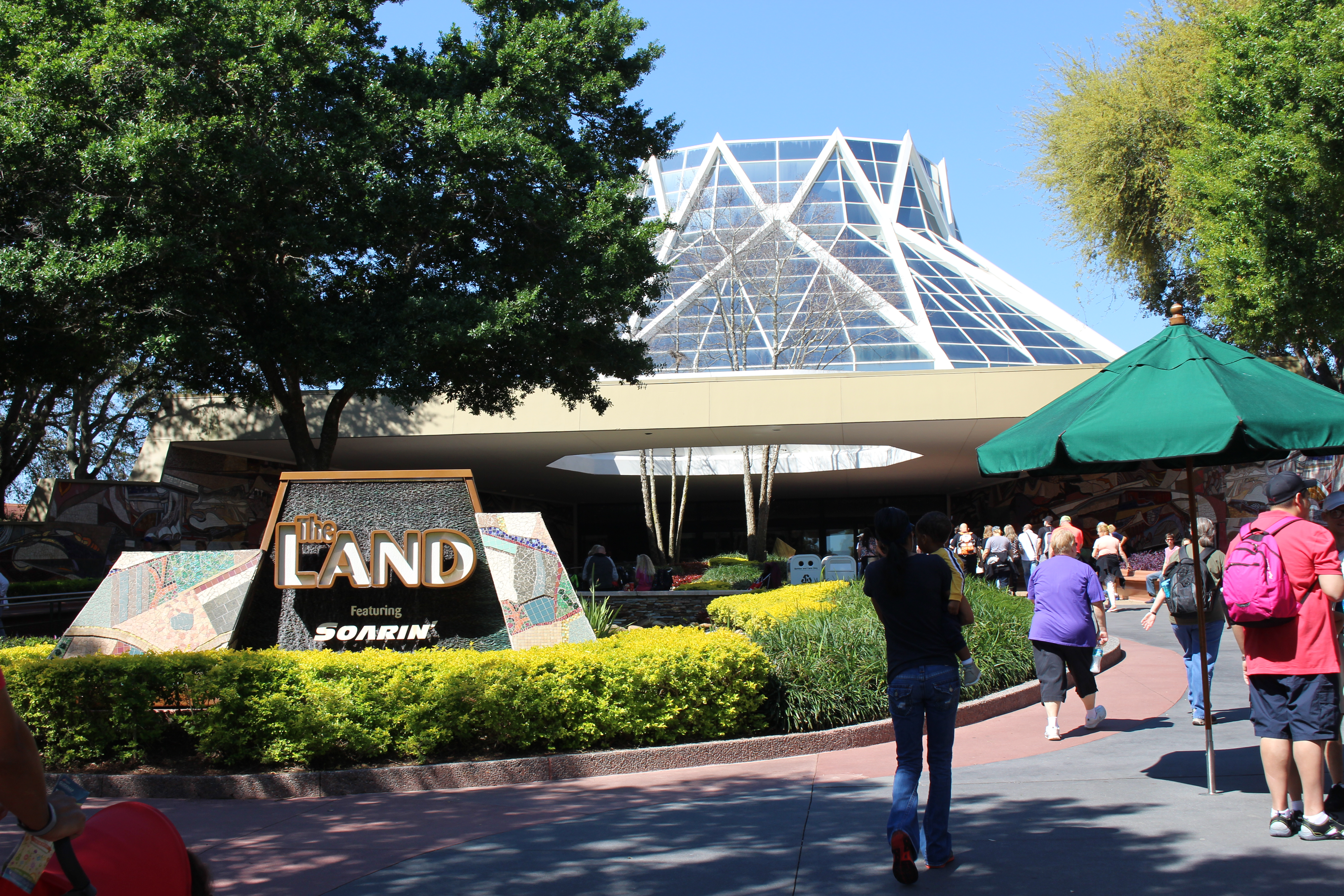
- Pavilion entrance pictured in 2017

Epcot
- Area: Future World (1982–2021); World Nature (2021–)
- Coordinates: 28.373957°N 81.551744°W
- Status: Operating
- Opening date: October 1, 1982

Ride statistics
- Designer: WED Enterprises
- Theme: Human interaction with the Earth
- Sponsors: Kraft (1982–1992); Nestlé (1993–2009)

The Land is a pavilion located in the World Nature neighborhood of Epcot, a theme park at the Walt Disney World Resort in Bay Lake, Florida. The pavilion is dedicated to human interaction with the Earth, focusing on agriculture, conservation, and travel. It opened on October 1, 1982, as part of the Phase I features for the grand opening of what was then known as EPCOT Center. It explores how humans can both use the land for their benefit and how they can also destroy it. Future Technology in better preserving the land is also explored in the pavilion, along with a focus on the celebration of the land itself.

The 24 hectare (2.5 million square foot) facility features four attractions: Soarin', Living with the Land, Harvest Theater (including Awesome Planet), and Behind the Seeds Tour.

== Contributions of Merle Jensen ==
Dr. Merle Jensen, Ph.D., a Professor Emeritus from the University of Arizona's School of Plant Science, played a pivotal role in the development of "The Land" Pavilion at EPCOT, Walt Disney World. Jensen, known for his extensive work in controlled environment agriculture (CEA), was the project leader for the agricultural systems within the pavilion. "The Land."

Jensen's contributions to "The Land" Pavilion include the design and implementation of various advanced agricultural systems. These systems demonstrate sustainable farming practices and the future of agriculture, aligning with EPCOT's theme of innovation and global community. His work at "The Land" has been recognized as a significant achievement in the field of CEA, reflecting his broader impact on agricultural practices worldwide.

Dr. Jensen's career spans over four decades, during which he has developed intensive food production systems for both terrestrial and extraterrestrial applications. His expertise has been sought by numerous international organizations, and he has played a crucial role in advancing agricultural technology globally.

== History ==
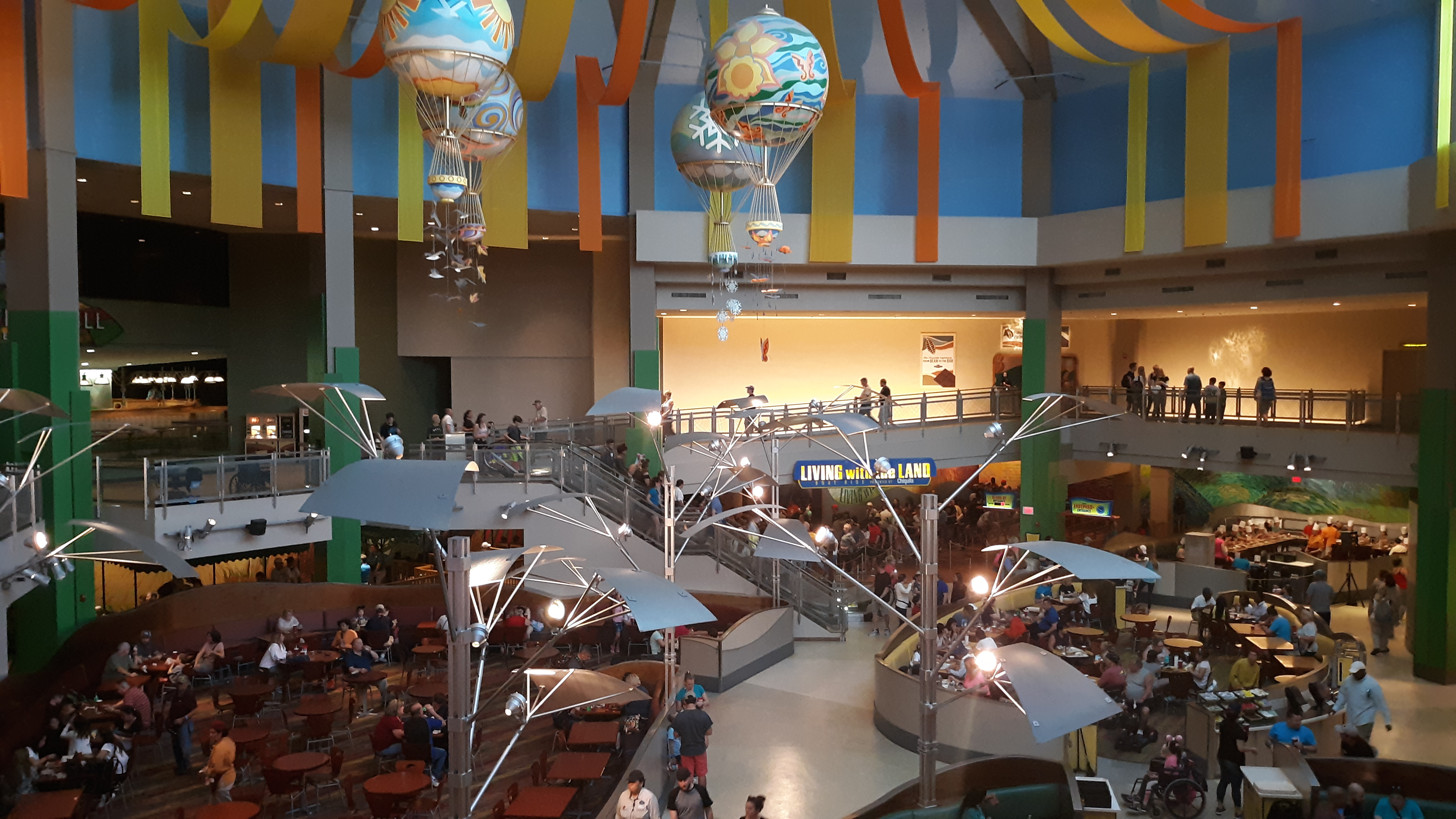
The Land Pavilion

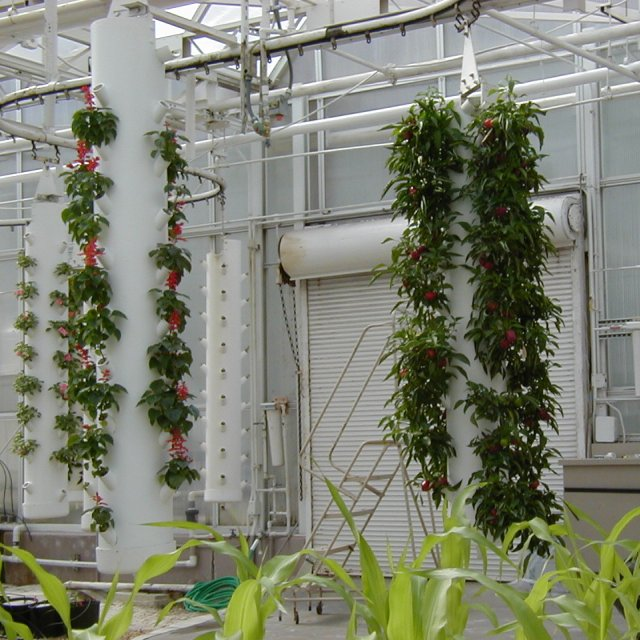
Plants Growing in the greenhouse, as seen from Living with the Land.

While "The Land" pavilion has existed since 1982, it has gone through three significant phases. The pavilion's first incarnation involved a ten-year sponsorship under Kraft Foods Inc. then later Kraft General Foods, Inc. from 1982–1992. Kraft played a vital role in co-financing the everyday functions of the attractions, restaurants, and shops inside the pavilion. The pavilion's interior and exterior design featured earth tone colors and exotic plant life.

Kraft General Foods, Inc. withdrew its sponsorship on September 26, 1992,

On November 24, 1992, plans were made to update and modernize the overall tone of EPCOT Center, including a major refurbishment of "The Land" pavilion. with Nestlé taking Kraft's place officially on January 1, 1993. Co-financed by Nestlé and the Walt Disney World Resort, a gradual refurbishment of the pavilion began on September 27, 1993.

The pavilion itself was cosmetically freshened. While some of the original design elements remained, the addition of more vibrant colors and fabrics to the various restaurants and shops gave the pavilion a more modern and refreshed look. The names of certain shops, restaurants, and attractions also changed during this time. The pavilion's main attraction, Listen to the Land, which took guests on connected boats through various exhibits within the pavilion, reopened mostly unchanged as Living with the Land on December 10, 1993.

The Kitchen Kabaret Revue, another of the pavilion's original attractions featuring an Audio-Animatronics presentation about nutrition, closed on January 3, 1994. It was replaced with a new show titled Food Rocks, which featured some of the elements from the original show with an updated presentation intended to be more modern and appealing to younger audiences.

Symbiosis, the last of "The Land"'s three original attractions, was closed on January 1, 1995. This attraction, which was a cinematic presentation that discussed both the positive and negative aspects of human relationship with the land, eventually reopened as Circle of Life: An Environmental Fable, a new film featuring characters from The Lion King. Like the Food Rocks show, this new attraction recycled some of the elements of its predecessor, and was intended to be another refreshed and modernized feature of "The Land" that would better appeal to younger audiences.

In 2003, Nestlé renewed its sponsorship of "The Land"; however, it was under agreement that Nestlé would oversee its own refurbishment to both the interior and exterior of the conservatory-style pavilion. Between 2004 and 2005, the pavilion underwent its second major refurbishment. It received a new color scheme featuring a vibrant selection of white, yellow, and green. New foliage was added to complement the existing greenery. The walkways and stroller parking to the pavilion's entrance were redefined and widened. All of the carpeting in the pavilion was replaced, and the main food court was completely redesigned. The pavilion's signage was updated, incorporating the new color scheme, new typography, and a modernized logotype. The pavilion's original dedication plaque remained unchanged.

The most significant change to "The Land" during its 2004–2005 refurbishment was the closure and entire demolition of Food Rocks, which initially occurred on January 3, 2004. Taking its place would be Soarin', a major attraction that was originally designed and built for Disney California Adventure Park. Simulating the experience of hang gliding over various landscapes, Soarin's massive movie screens and ride mechanics required the construction of a large physical addition to the pavilion itself. Both Soarin' at Epcot and Lights, Motors, Action!: Extreme Stunt Show at Disney's Hollywood Studios opened to guests on May 5, 2005, coinciding with the start of Disney's Happiest Celebration on Earth Campaign. "The Land" officially reopened that same day. While "The Land" as a pavilion has somewhat changed, its purpose has not, and it remains a positive and serious experience featuring elements from all three of its phases, allowing today's guests to experience all that "The Land" has to offer.

On February 13, 2009, Nestlé pulled out of sponsorship, leaving "The Land" without a sponsor.

"Living with the Land" was closed for a vehicle update from August 2, 2009, to October 2, 2009. This update increased passenger capacity from 36 to 40 guests per vehicle. Newer, more wheelchair-friendly vehicles were also a new addition.

On July 29, 2011, Chiquita signed on as the new sponsor for the ride Living with the Land. However, it is not mentioned in-ride by the narrator (Mike Brassell) nor does it have a VIP lounge in The Land building itself.

=== Horticulture research ===
In addition to being an entertainment venue, "The Land" is also a demonstration, production, and research facility. 43,000 ft² (0.4 hectares) of the pavilion are dedicated to experimental horticulture techniques in hydroponics, irrigation methods, and integrated pest management.

=== Services ===
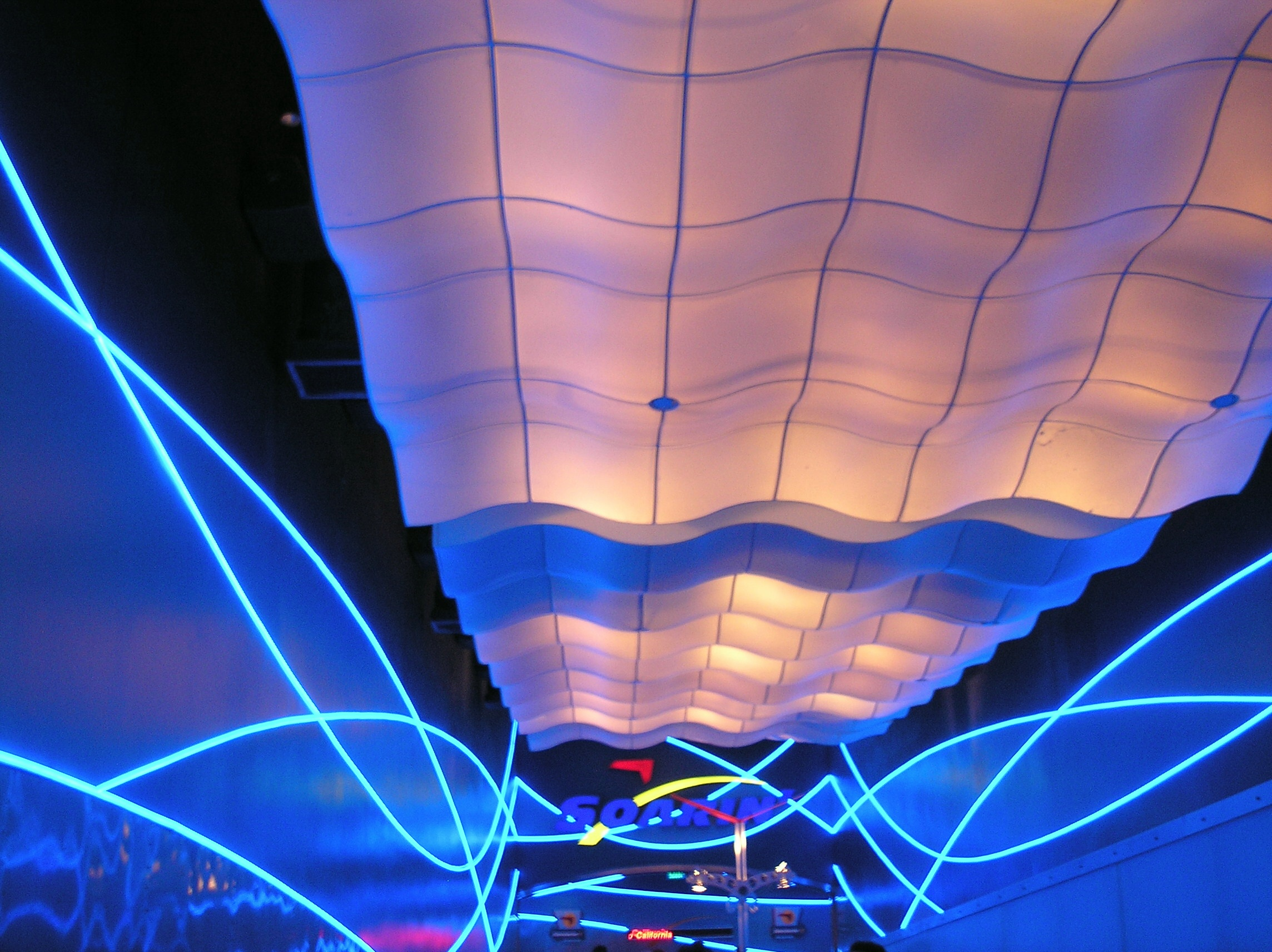
Entrance to Soarin'

==== Current attractions ====
- Soarin' Around the World – Take flight on a breezy, airborne adventure above the breathtaking wonders of the world.
- Living with the Land – A narrated boat tour about ecology and agriculture that takes guests through an indoor dark ride portion and an outdoor greenhouse and hydroponics lab, revealing the crops and animals cultivated for use at Epcot.
- Harvest Theater (1982–)
  - Awesome Planet – A 4D film about the Earth's biomes and the perils of climate change, with narration by Ty Burrell.
- Behind the Seeds Tour – For an extra fee, an approximately one-hour long tour of the research facility that explains what is being researched, and how the research is conducted.

==== Current dining ====
- The Garden Grill – Family restaurant with a farm house atmosphere, which includes a rotating seated area, offering a view of the dark ride section of Living with the Land. The revolving floor had remained stationary for several months over the spring of 2014, and despite rumors of a permanent stoppage, the floor returned to operation from June 17, 2014.
- Sunshine Seasons – A food court
  - Asian Shop – A variety of noodle bowls and stir-fries.
  - Sandwich Shop – A variety of made to order sandwiches.
  - Soup/Salad Shop – A variety of soups and salads.
  - Wood-Fired Grill Shop – Rotisserie chicken, beef and fish.
  - Bakery – Nestlé Toll House cookies, ice cream, among others.
  - Breakfast – Breakfast here offers pastries, and combos that include eggs, one choice of bacon or sausage, and a drink.

==== Current shopping ====
- Soarin' Tour Desk – A desk, located to the left of the entrance to Soarin', where Guests may sign up for the Behind the Seeds Greenhouse Tour, which takes place in the greenhouse section of the Living With The Land attraction. Guests may also purchase Mickey's Mini Gardens, tiny plants produced through tissue culture in nutrient gel and packaged in sterile tubes.
- Green Thumb Emporium – A small merchandise area, located across from the Soarin' Tour Desk. A small assortment of Soarin' T-shirts and pins, along with disposable cameras and Mickey's Mini Gardens are available for purchase. Note that this shop has taken on the name of the former, much larger, shop at The Land which occupied the same approximate area.

==== Former attractions ====
An older logo for The Land; the current pavilion logo seen at the top of this article is based on this logo, but with thinner lines, adjusted leaves, and a yellow-green coloration.

- Listen to the Land (October 1, 1982 – September 27, 1993) – A boat ride about agriculture. Replaced with Living with the Land.
- Kitchen Kabaret (October 1, 1982 – January 3, 1994) – An audio-animatronics stage show about nutrition. Replaced with Food Rocks.
- Food Rocks (March 26, 1994 – January 3, 2004) – An audio-animatronics stage show about nutrition, featuring parodies of classic songs. Replaced with Soarin'.
- Harvest Theater (1982–present)
  - Symbiosis (October 1, 1982 – January 1, 1995) – A film about symbiosis. Replaced with Circle of Life: An Environmental Fable.
  - Circle of Life: An Environmental Fable (January 21, 1995 – February 3, 2018) – A film about Simba describing symbiosis to Timon and Pumbaa. Replaced with Awesome Planet.

==== Former dining ====
- The Good Turn Restaurant (October 1, 1982 – May 1, 1986) – The original name of the present Garden Grill Restaurant.
- The Land Grille Room (May 2, 1986 – November 15, 1993) – The second name given to the present Garden Grill Restaurant.
- Farmer's Market (October 1, 1982 – October 25, 1993) – The name of "The Land's" original food court.
- The Sunshine Season Food Fair (1994–2004) – The second name given to "The Land's" food court.
  - Ice Cream – Nestlé Toll House cookies, ice cream, among others.
  - Potato Store – A variety of potato dishes.
  - Pasta – A variety of pasta dishes.
  - Soup/Salad – A variety of soups and salads.
  - Barbecue – BBQ chicken and beef.

==== Former shopping ====
- Broccoli & Co. – Original shop alongside Kitchen Kabaret. Sold merchandise of said attraction, including magnets, plush and other souvenirs related to the pavilion.
- The Green Thumb Emporium – Second gift shop; small but with a focus on food and gardening.

== Facts and figures ==
- Capacity: 3,600 persons
- Size: 253,780 square feet (24,000 m²) Roughly the size of Fantasyland in the Magic Kingdom of Walt Disney World.
- Sponsor(s): Kraft Foods Inc. (October 1, 1982 - September 26, 1993), and Nestlé (September 27, 1993 - Early 2009)

== See also ==
- List of Epcot attractions
