= The Doodletown Pipers =

1960s - 70s vocal group

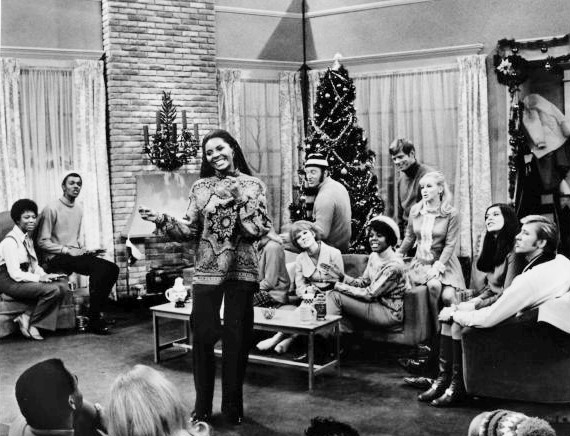
- The Doodletown Pipers (as themselves) with Leslie Uggams (as herself), Robert Morse (as Robert Dickson) and E. J. Peaker (as Gloria Quigley Dickson) in "Our First Christmas" (the thirteenth episode of the 26-episode 1960s American musical comedy television series That's Life)

Background information
- Also known as: The New Doodletown Pipers
- Genres: Easy listening
- Years active: 1960s and 1970s
- Labels: Epic Records; Sony Music Entertainment; Legacy Recordings; Bell Records
- Past members: Ward Ellis; George Wilkins; Bernie Brillstein; Jerry Weintraub; Teresa Graves; Helen (Aiken) Maxwell; Taffy Jones; Steve Sweetland; Tommy Webb; Lynn Dolin; Jim Gilstrap; "Little Ricky" Richard Doran; Patty "Chocolate" Banks; Holly Mershon; Mike Campbell; Mic Bell; Joy Jolley; Helen Sexton; Natalie Cirello; Jill McDonald; Kathy Cahill; Pat Henderson; Karen Warren; Linda A.; "Big Bob" Anderson; Gene Meyer; Russell Carson; Bill Lively; Marshall Ramirez; Emmitt Cash; Bob Kenny; Ellie Mandel; Elaine Blakely; Lorna Wright; Pam Feener; Sharry Dore; Larry Puma; Kathy Wright; Jan Bunch; Samantha "Sammie" Williams; Tom McKenzie; Oren Waters; Augie Johnson; Samantha Lessard; Rod Anderson; Ed Lojeski

The Doodletown Pipers (also known as The New Doodletown Pipers) were a 1960s and 1970s easy listening musical vocal group founded by Ward Ellis, George Wilkins, Bernie Brillstein and Jerry Weintraub.

The Doodletown Pipers made numerous appearances on network television (including The Ed Sullivan Show), and worked with such names as Count Basie, The Carpenters, Perry Como, Bing Crosby, Bob Hope, Frank Gorshin, Alan King, Mike Post, Sarah Vaughan, John Wayne, and Rowan & Martin. Members of the group included Mic Bell, Mike Campbell, Jim Gilstrap, Teresa Graves, Augie Johnson, Rod Anderson, Tom McKenzie, Samantha Lessard, and Oren Waters.

The Doodletown Pipers are considered by some to be the epitome of bland, squeaky-clean popular music. One critic describes their music paradoxically as "dull-as-lint" yet at the same time "weirdly but undeniably charming." On his television program, Roger Miller referred to them as the "Poodletown Diapers".

== History ==
The Doodletown Pipers' first appearance was on The Red Skelton Show with 30 members in the group. The group was then cut down to 20 members when they opened for George Burns and Lainie Kazan at The Nugget in Sparks, Nevada in June, 1966. The original members were Holly Mershon, Teresa Graves, Helen (Aiken) Maxwell, Joy Jolley, Helen Sexton, Natalie Cirello, Jill McDonald, Kathy Cahill, Lynn Dolin, Pat Henderson, Karen Warren, and Linda A., Mike Campbell, "Little Ricky" Richard Doran, "Big Bob" Anderson, Gene Meyer, Tommy Webb, Russell Carson, Bill Lively, Marshall Ramirez, Emmitt Cash, and Bob Kenny. Some of the first replacements were Rod Anderson, Steve Sweetland, Jim Gilstrap, Augie Johnson, Ellie Mandel, Elaine Blakely, Lorna Wright, Pam Feener, Sharry Dore, Larry Puma, Kathy Wright, Jan Bunch, Patty "Chocolate" Banks, Samantha "Sammie" Williams, and Taffy Jones.

The group worked non-stop from 1966 through the late 1970s. They toured with Nancy Wilson, who was an early supporter of the group. They also opened for, among others, Perry Como, Jane Morgan (whose husband, Jerry Weintraub, was one of the group's managers), Eddie Fisher, Shelley Berman, Phil Harris, and Henry Mancini. The Pipers also worked such venues as The Greek Theater, Madison Square Garden, Avery Fisher Hall, The Sands, Sahara, Flamingo and Frontier Hotels in Las Vegas, Lake Tahoe and Reno, Nevada.

The Doodletown Pipers had two television shows. They were on the Smothers Brothers' 1967 summer replacement show Our Place co-starring Jack Burns, Avery Schreiber and Rowlf the Dog (puppeteered by Jim Henson), was produced by Ed Sullivan. They appeared in six one-hour specials starring The Doodletown Pipers with guest-stars such as Norm Crosby. They were semi-regulars on The Roger Miller Show (1966) and were regulars on The Carpenters summer 1971 TV show Make Your Own Kind of Music, both on NBC. Other television appearances included The Jerry Lewis Show, The Beautiful Phyllis Diller Show, and The Ed Sullivan Show (six times, once following a promotional video for The Beatles' "Hello, Goodbye"). They appeared on specials including "Rodgers & Hart Today," the Emmy Award-winning Sing Out Sweet Land with John Wayne, and numerous shows with Bing Crosby and Perry Como.

While the group's records had reasonable success, after they were signed by Bell Records as "The New Doodletown Pipers" by TV composer and record producer Mike Post in 1971, their new records met with little success.

The Doodletown Pipers' last appearance may have been in 1987, when they appeared on Dave Letterman's Old Fashioned Christmas, a special episode of Late Night with David Letterman.

== Members ==
- Ward Ellis
- George Wilkins
- Bernie Brillstein
- Jerry Weintraub
- Teresa Graves
- Helen (Aiken) Maxwell
- Taffy Jones
- Steve Sweetland
- Tommy Webb
- Lynn Dolin
- Jim Gilstrap
- "Little Ricky" Richard Doran
- Patty "Chocolate" Banks
- Holly Mershon
- Mike Campbell
- Mic Bell
- Joy Jolley
- Helen Sexton
- Natalie Cirello
- Jill McDonald
- Kathy Cahill
- Pat Henderson
- Karen Warren
- Linda A.
- "Big Bob" Anderson
- Gene Meyer
- Russell Carson
- Bill Lively
- Marshall Ramirez
- Emmitt Cash
- Bob Kenny
- Ellie Mandel
- Elaine Blakely
- Lorna Wright
- Pam Feener
- Sharry Dore
- Larry Puma
- Kathy Wright
- Jan Bunch
- Samantha "Sammie" Williams
- Tom McKenzie
- Oren Waters
- Augie Johnson
- Samantha Lessard
- Rod Anderson
- Ed Lojeski
- Christine Seubert

== Popular culture ==
The group received a publicity boost when they were mentioned in a 1997 episode of The Simpsons titled "El Viaje Misterioso de Nuestro Jomer (The Mysterious Voyage of Homer)":

Homer: "We don't have anything in common. Look at these records: Jim Nabors, Glen Campbell, the Doodletown Pipers. Now look at her records! They stink!"

The group was also mentioned in season six of the movie-lampooning TV show Mystery Science Theater 3000, the episode (episode #620) in which Mike and the bots watch the 1967 Italian spy film Danger!! Death Ray. Shortly after the opening credits end, the wordless-vocal theme song (that plays periodically throughout the film) continues over the action. As the song ends, robot Crow affects the voice of a radio DJ, saying: "That was Bop-ba-dop-a-da-da by the Doodletown Pipers!"

== Discography ==
- Singalong '67 (released and recorded in 1967)
- Here Come the Doodletown Pipers (released and recorded in 1966)
- Love Themes: Hit Songs for Those in Love (released and recorded in 1968)
