= Living with the Land =

Attraction in The Land pavilion at Epcot

- Post-sponsorship logo used since 2021

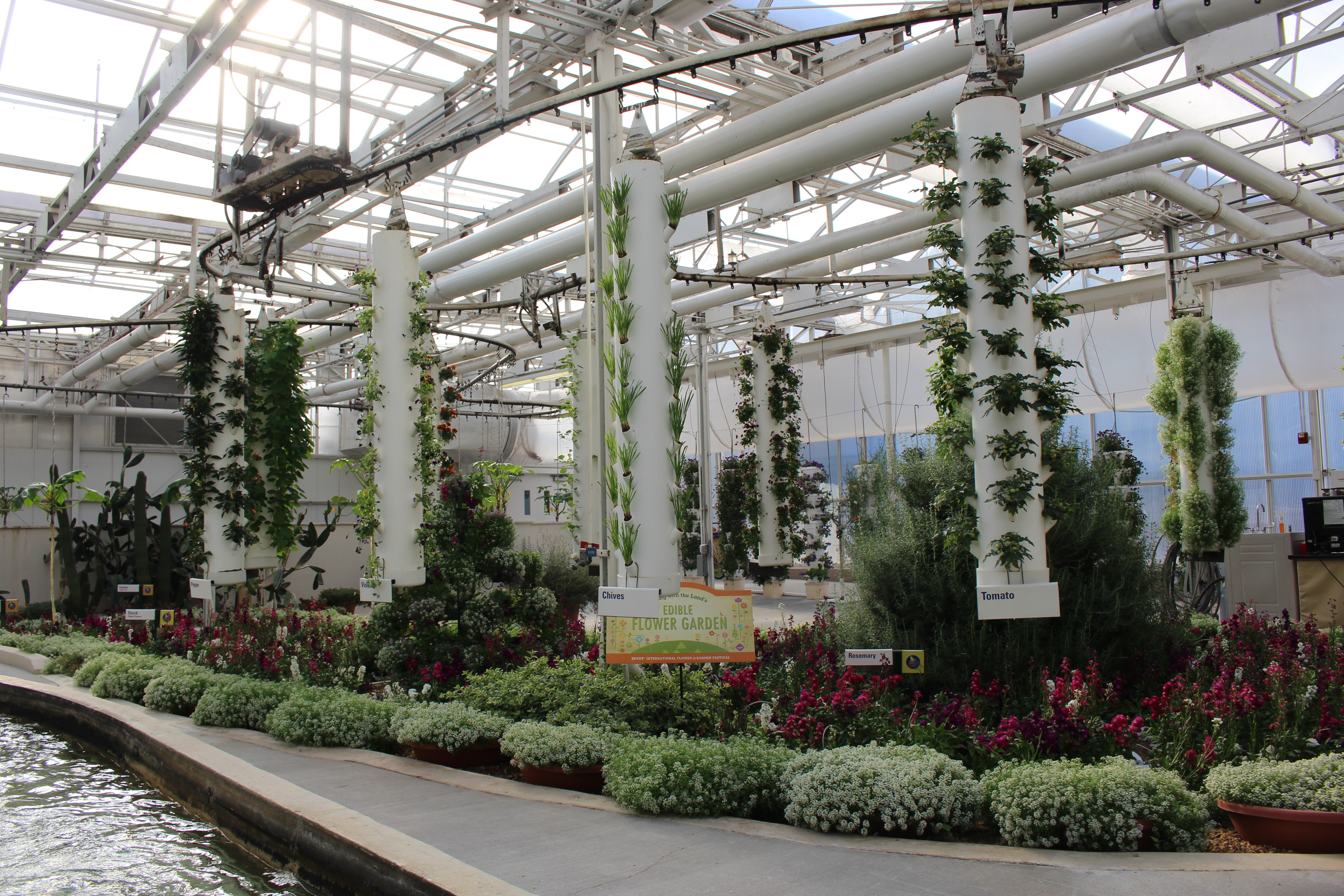
- Various plants growing in hydroponic towers.

Epcot
- Area: Future World (1982–2021); World Nature (2021–present)
- Coordinates: 28°22′25.97″N 81°33′10.39″W
- Status: Operating
- Opening date: October 1, 1982 December 10, 1993 (as Listen to the Land)
- Closing date: September 27, 1993 (as Listen to the Land)

Ride statistics
- Attraction type: Hybrid dark ride/greenhouse tour
- Designer: WED Enterprises
- Theme: Agriculture
- Music: George Wilkins
- Capacity: 1600 riders per hour
- Vehicle type: Tandem boats
- Vehicles: 16 (with two spares)
- Riders per vehicle: 40
- Rows: 10
- Riders per row: 4
- Duration: 14:55
- Host: Marsha Mason (queue); Mike Brassell (on-board narration)
- Audio-animatronics: 35
- Sponsors: Kraft (1982–1992); Nestlé (1993–2009); Chiquita Brands International (2011–2020)
- Lightning Lane Available
- Wheelchair accessible
- Assistive listening available

Living with the Land (originally Listen to the Land) is a slow-moving boat ride consisting of a dark ride and greenhouse tour located within The Land, a pavilion at World Nature at the Epcot theme park at the Walt Disney World Resort in Bay Lake, Florida. The focus of the ride is on agriculture, especially new technology to make agriculture more efficient, sustainable, and environmentally friendly.

== Ride experience ==
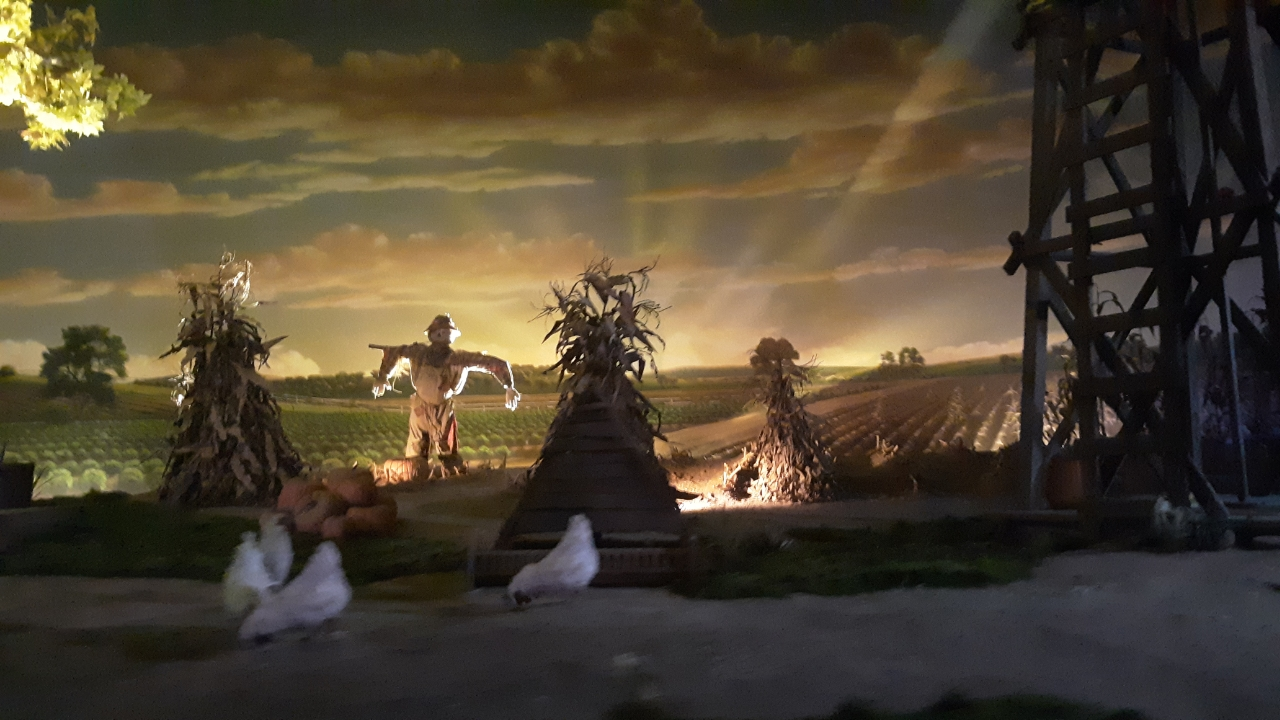
The prairie diorama within the Living with the Land attraction

The dark-ride portion of this attraction opens with a scene of a deciduous forest in the middle of a thunderstorm. This illustrates how the forces that shape the land can appear destructive to us. The boat then sails through artificial biomes representing a tropical rainforest, a desert and the American prairie. Some of the Audio-Animatronic figures in this section were originally created for the never-built Magic Kingdom attraction, Western River Expedition. The biomes feature sound and lighting effects, in addition to heat, wind and mist, to simulate real conditions. The boats float through a small theater that illustrates the relationship between humans and the environment, and the ways that we have been modifying the land to better serve our purposes.

The second part of the attraction takes place in The Land's "Living Laboratory", which showcases ideas about the future of agriculture. All of the plants in this section are grown through various methods of hydroponics. Plants are grown in sand, perlite, coconut coir and rockwool.

There are five distinct areas of the "living laboratory", which are:

- Tropics Greenhouse - This greenhouse features crops from the tropical areas of the world, including both familiar and exotic foods. Plants on display include banana, cacao, jackfruit, date palm, dragon fruit, vanilla, cleome, pineapple, Java apple and papaya.
- Aquacell - This section focuses on aquaculture, or "fish farming." It includes several high-density tanks and a few low-density display tanks and tubes. Animals on display include tilapia, sturgeon, paddlefish, catfish, bass, and shrimp. Some of the fish harvested from the Aquacell are served in the Coral Reef Restaurant in The Seas pavilion.
- Temperate Greenhouse (formerly the Desert Greenhouse) - A greenhouse featuring crops from temperate climates. Currently, the Temperate house showcases large-sized crops, such as Prizewinner and Atlantic Giant pumpkins, winter melon, pomelo, and "Nine-pound Lemon." Other crops include sunflower, beets, turnip, cotton, millet and cassabanana.

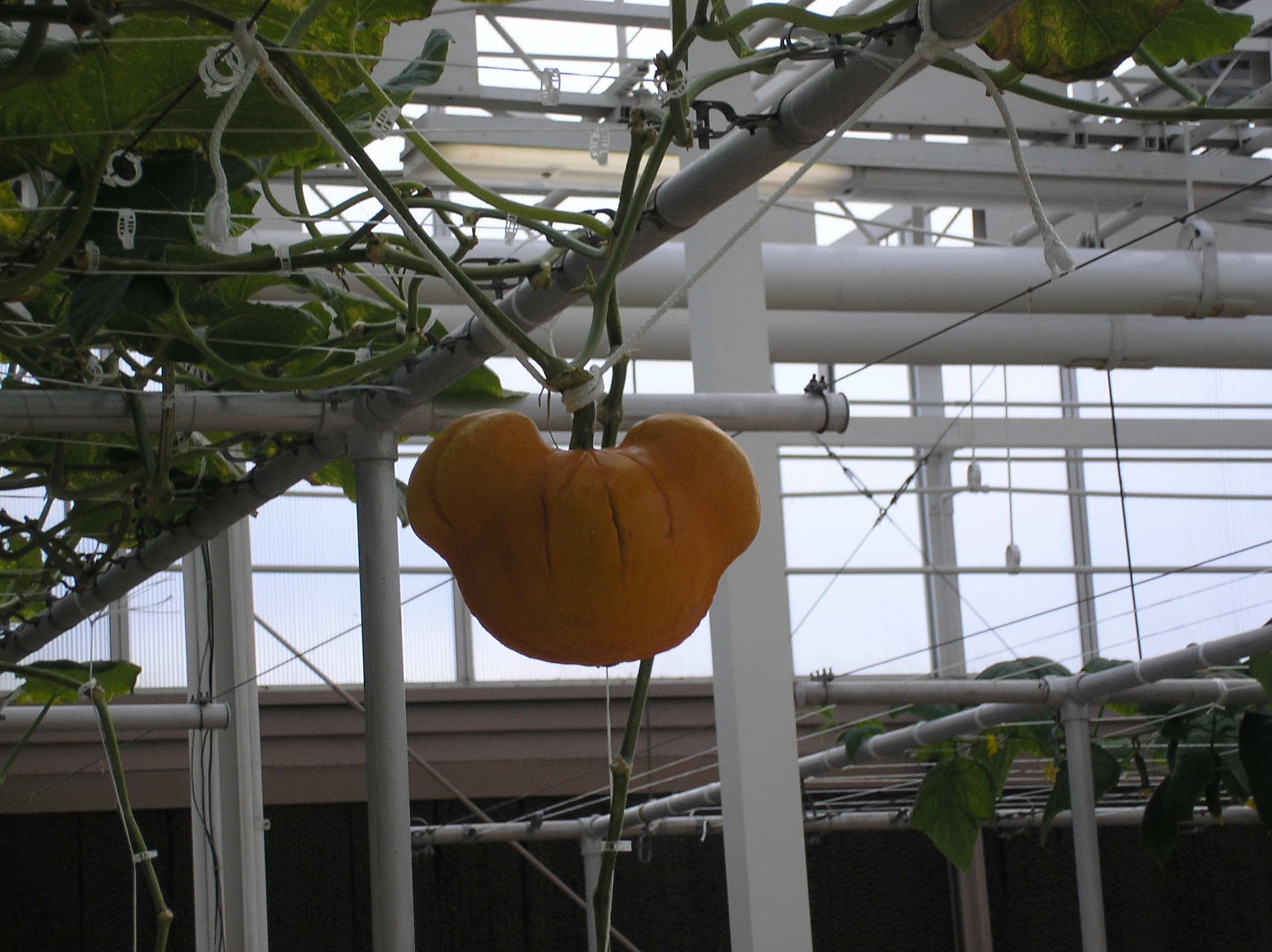
A Mickey Mouse shaped pumpkin

- String Greenhouse (formerly the Production Greenhouse) - This greenhouse focuses on innovative high-density techniques, such as Nutrient film technique. It also shows off "vertical growing techniques", in which plants are grown on specialized trellises which cause the herbaceous plants to approximate the shape and structure of trees. One of the most famous examples of these trees is The Land's "tomato tree", which produced over 32,000 tomatoes in a 16-month period. It was recognized by Guinness World Records as the most productive tomato plant in the world. Other crops include eggplant, peppers, winged bean, lettuce and snake gourd. Furthermore, cucumbers and pumpkins are grown in the shape of Mickey Mouse through the use of special molds. Much of the produce grown in the String Greenhouse is used in The Garden Grill and Sunshine Seasons, both restaurants in The Land pavilion. In total, over 30 tons of produce are harvested from The Land each year.
- Creative Greenhouse - The final greenhouse in the attraction shows some innovative ideas about the future of agriculture. Most of the plants in Creative House are grown via Aeroponics, in which a fine mist of water and nutrients is sprayed directly onto the roots of the plants. The roots dangle freely in the air, and are not hindered by any growing medium. Some of the plants' roots in Creative House are enclosed within rotating columns and A-frame structures, while others are completely exposed to the open air, at least temporarily, so the entire plant may be viewed by the Guests on the boat ride. Creative House also features a small exhibit of NASA hydroponic growing units, which were developed for use on extended-length space journeys. Crops on display include tomato, squash, lettuce, basil, rosemary, cabbage, super-dwarf wheat, swiss chard, marigold and snapdragon.

Additionally, the Living Laboratory contains:

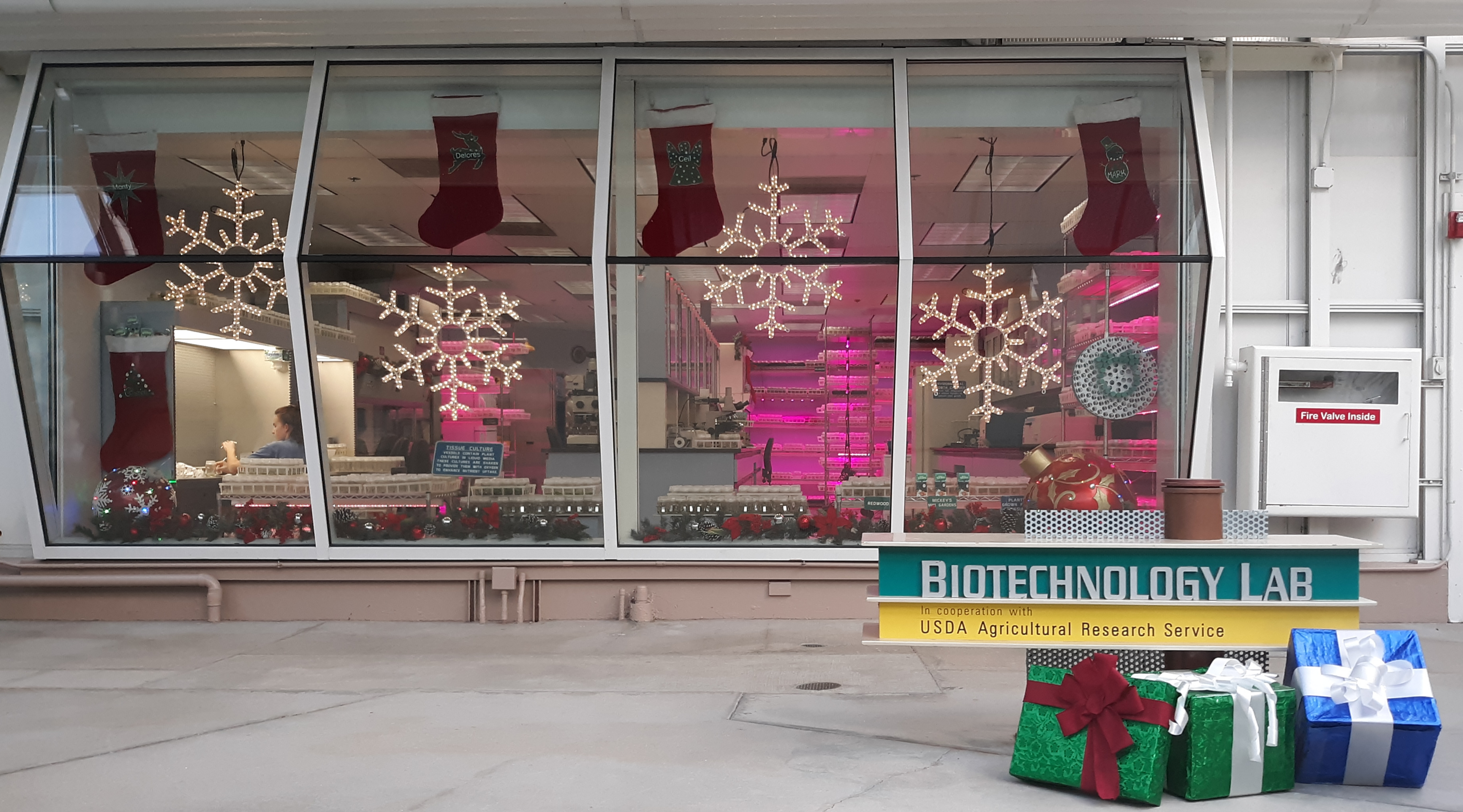
The US Department of Agriculture Research lab within Living with the Land

- Biotechnology Lab - Attached to the Creative Greenhouse, the Biotechnology Lab is a sterile research environment. Several USDA scientists are on-site at The Land, performing research on crop improvement. The Land also produces a product called "Mickey's Mini Gardens" in the Biotechnology Lab, which are available for purchase in several locations in Epcot.
- Integrated Pest Management Lab - An Entomology laboratory that raises beneficial insects for use in The Land and all over Walt Disney World property. It is not visible on the Living with the Land boat ride, but is visited during the Behind the Seeds backstage tour. Insects raised here include tiny, stingless parasitoid wasps and ladybugs.

The ride concludes with a lighted collage of people and produce from all over the world, along with a projection of Earth as seen from space.

=== Holiday overlays ===
During the EPCOT International Festival of the Holidays, the attraction is transformed into "Living with the Land - Glimmering Greenhouses". While the dark-ride portion of the attraction remains unchanged, the greenhouses are enhanced with holiday lighting and decorations, and the narration is updated to describe how the foods produced in the greenhouses are used in holiday celebrations around the world.

== Listen to the Land ==
Living with the Land is an updated version of a previous attraction, Listen to the Land. Very little was changed between the two versions of the attraction. The opening scene, the "Symphony of the Seed", which provided a stylized look at the growth of a plant, was replaced by the opening storm scene. Also, the Biotechnology lab was relocated from the exit tunnel to the Creative Greenhouse. The Integrated Pest Management Lab is now housed in the space formerly occupied by the Biotechnology Lab. The ride has been updated to use an automated narration on each boat, instead of a Cast Member on each boat providing live narration.

Also, the theme song "Listen to the Land" is no longer used in the attraction, though an instrumental version can still be heard in The Land's exterior background music loop as well the music loop played inside the Garden Grill. They are currently using portions of various other pieces, including "Rain Forest Rhapsody" and "Dawn of a New Day".

== Image gallery ==
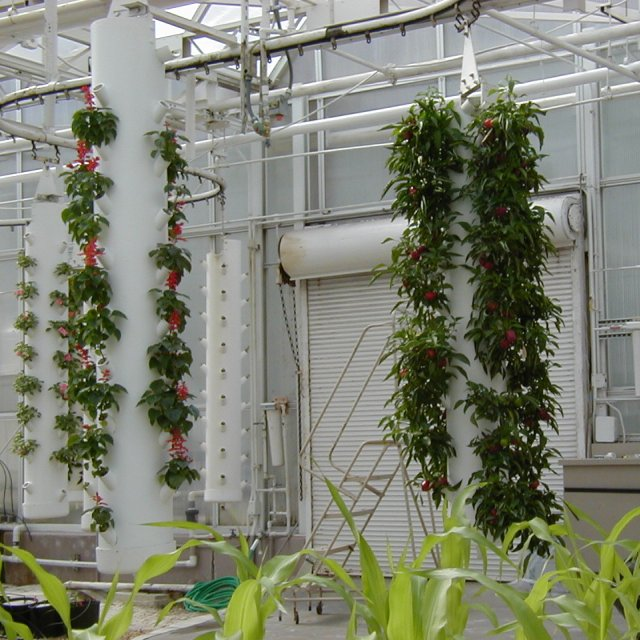
A demonstration of non-traditional agriculture in the greenhouse of The Land pavilion, as seen from Living with the Land

A demonstration of intercropping, as seen in the greenhouse of The Land pavilion, as seen from Living with the Land

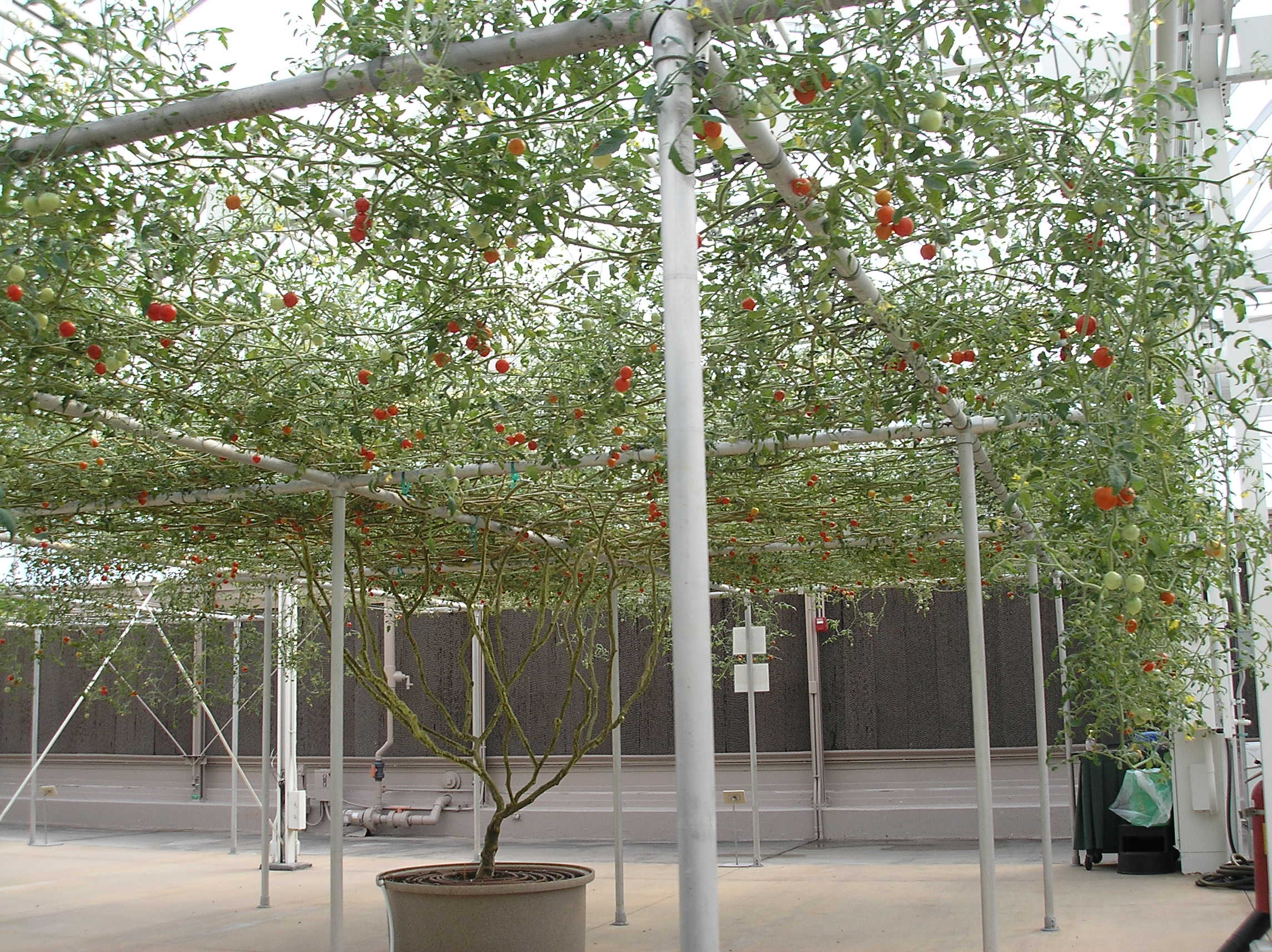
A "tomato tree"

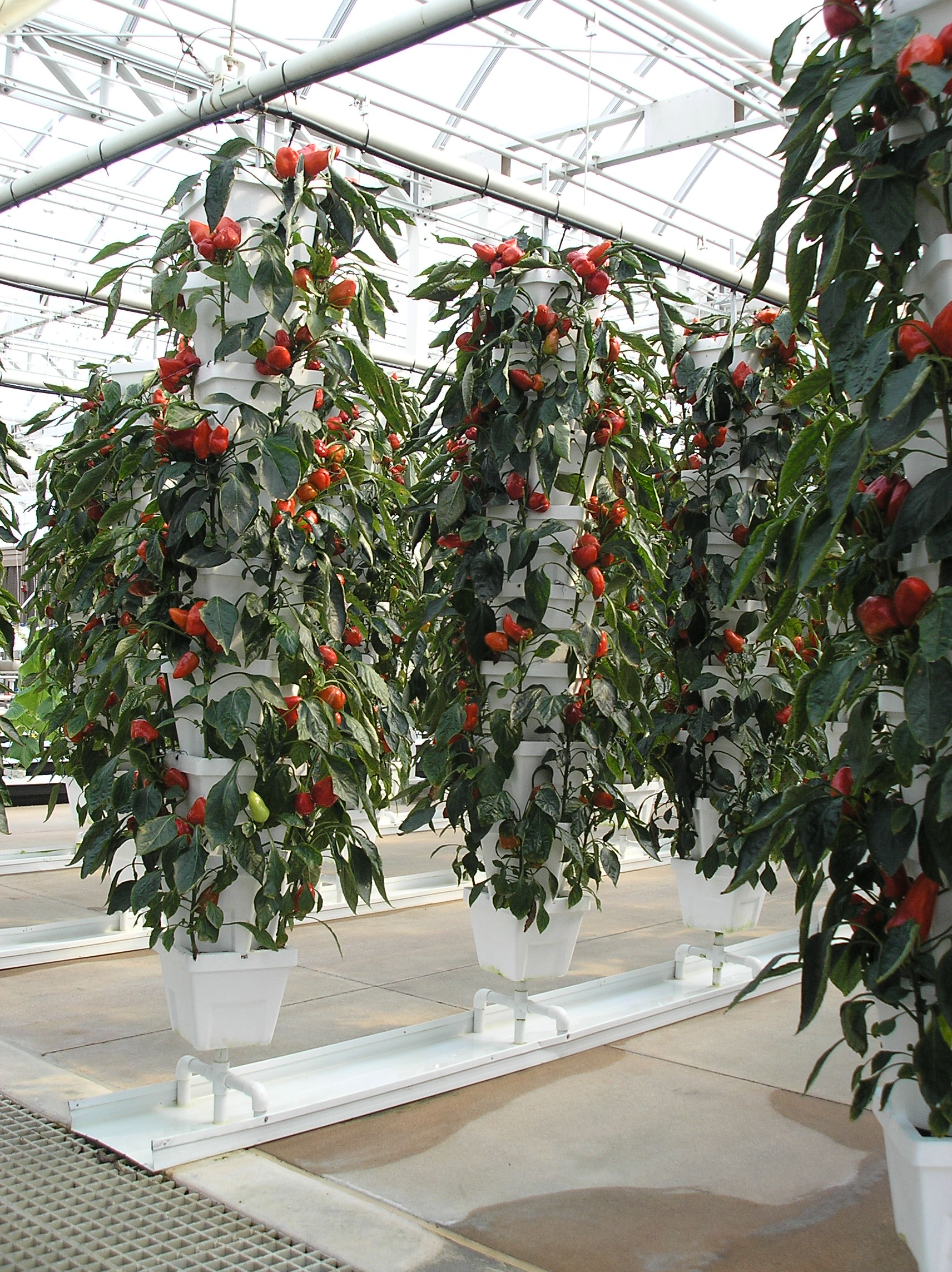
Pepper plants in "Verti-Gro" columns

== See also ==
- Epcot attraction and entertainment history
