= Food Rocks =

Former Audio-Animatronic show at Epcot

- Official attraction poster

Epcot
- Area: Future World (The Land Pavilion)
- Coordinates: 28°22′25″N 81°33′08″W
- Status: Removed
- Opening date: March 26, 1994
- Closing date: January 3, 2004
- Replaced: Kitchen Kabaret
- Replaced by: Soarin' (World Nature)

Ride statistics
- Attraction type: Audio-Animatronic theater show
- Designer: Walt Disney Imagineering
- Theme: Nutrition
- Duration: 12:39
- Host: Fūd Wrapper
- Sponsor: Nestlé

Food Rocks was an attraction at Epcot's The Land Pavilion at Walt Disney World. The attraction, a musical stage show presented by Nestlé featuring Audio-Animatronic figures, opened on March 26, 1994, and closed on January 3, 2004, being replaced by Soarin'.

== Synopsis ==
The show was themed as a benefit concert for good nutrition hosted by Fūd Wrapper, who was voiced by real-life rapper Tone Lōc. However, the show would be continually interrupted by the Excess, a junk-food heavy metal band that detested nutrition. In the end, the Excess would lose their power as Wrapper exclaimed, "No power? You guys have been unplugged! There's plenty of foods out there that are good to eat, but remember, always eat in moderation."

The Audio-Animatronic characters were food items with human features. The music was based on popular songs by well-known performers, with lyrics adapted to the topic of nutrition. For example, the song "Good Nutrition" by the Peach Boys was based on the song "Good Vibrations" by the Beach Boys. Five of these acts used the voices of the parodied musicians themselves: Tone Lōc, Neil Sedaka, Little Richard, the Pointer Sisters, and Chubby Checker. The only character who was not an animatronic was Chubby Cheddar, who appeared as a silhouetted projection on the center stage wall. The lead singer of the Refrigerator Police (a parody of the Police) was a repurposed version of the Mr. Dairy Goods animatronic from Kitchen Kabaret. Many of the characters returned for the finale.

Tina Turner was offered a role as Tina Tuna, a tuna that would have sung a song called "What's Meat Got to Go with It" (a parody of "What's Love Got to Do with It"), but Turner declined the offer.

== History ==
Food Rocks debuted inside The Land Pavilion at EPCOT Center on March 26, 1994. It replaced the former Audio-Animatronic show Kitchen Kabaret.

Following the closing of Food Rocks on January 3, 2004, and its eventual replacement by Soarin', the main theater was partially demolished, and what remained was walled off from guests as a backstage area. Eventually, in 2016, the physical remnants were removed for the arrival of new restrooms for Soarin', and the attraction's original animatronics were sold off via eBay or to private collectors.

== Music acts ==
Act	Song	Fictional group/artist	Parody of
1	"We'll Make It Count in the Kitchen"	The U-tensils (possibly a spoof of U2)	Queen – "Bohemian Rhapsody"
2	"Good Nutrition"	The Peach Boys	The Beach Boys – "Good Vibrations"
3	"Every Bite You Take"	Refrigerator Police	The Police – "Every Breath You Take" (voiced by Jess Harnell)
4	"High Fiber"	Pita Gabriel	Peter Gabriel – "Sledgehammer" (voiced by Jess Harnell)
5	"Always Read the Wrapper"	Fūd Wrapper	Tone Lōc – "Funky Cold Medina"
6	"Just Keep It Lean"	The Sole of Rock 'n' Roll	Cher – "The Shoop Shoop Song (It's in His Kiss)"
7	"Tutti Frutti"	Richard	Cover song (with lyrical changes), Little Richard (name parodied)
8	"Vegetables are Good for You"	Neil Moussaka	Neil Sedaka – "Breaking Up Is Hard to Do"
9	"Let's Exercise"	Chubby Cheddar	Chubby Checker – "The Twist"
10	"We Love Junk"	The Excess	Original song written for the show
11	"Just a Little Bit"	The Get-the-Point Sisters	Aretha Franklin – "Respect" (song parodied), the Pointer Sisters (name parodied)
12	"Choose Before You Chew"	Entire cast (minus Neil Moussaka and Chubby Cheddar)	Queen – "Bohemian Rhapsody" (reprise)

== See also ==
- List of Epcot attractions
