= Kitchen Kabaret =

Former Audio-Animatronic show at Epcot

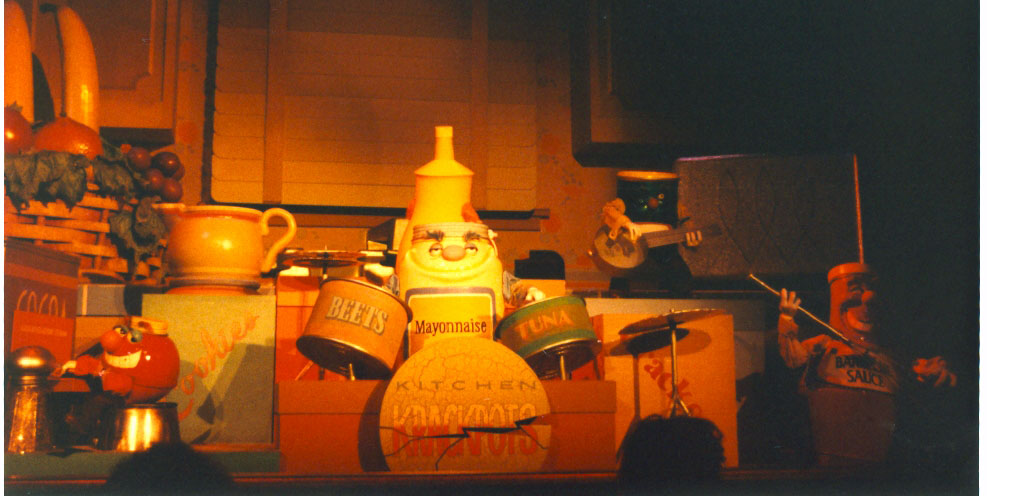
- The Kitchen Krackpots

Epcot
- Area: Future World (The Land Pavilion)
- Coordinates: 28°22′25″N 81°33′08″W
- Status: Removed
- Opening date: October 1, 1982
- Closing date: January 3, 1994
- Replaced by: Food Rocks

Ride statistics
- Attraction type: Audio-Animatronic variety show
- Designer: Walt Disney Imagineering
- Theme: Nutrition
- Host: Bonnie Appetite (voiced by Jeanine Brown)
- Sponsor: Kraft Foods (October 1, 1982–September 26, 1993)
- Wheelchair accessible

Kitchen Kabaret was a 13-minute audio-animatronic show at the Epcot park at Walt Disney World in Bay Lake, Florida, United States. Located in The Land pavilion, Kitchen Kabaret was present on EPCOT's opening day, October 1, 1982.

The hostess, Bonnie Appetite, introduced the acts in a musical revue and comedy format that advocated healthy eating and provided a primer on the four food groups: meat, dairy, grains, and fruits/vegetables.

The show was replaced in 1994 by Food Rocks.

== Show description ==
=== Introduction ===
"Meal Time Blues" by Bonnie Appetite
Bonnie sings this at the start of the show. Looking exhausted, she has cookbooks and her hair wrapped in a bun. She explains that it is time for her to prepare a meal, and she isn't too excited about it. The lights turn off, and the next performance begins.

=== Act 1 ===
"Chase Those (Meal Time) Blues Away" by Bonnie Appetite and the Kitchen Krackpots
The Kitchen Krackpots band (containers of mayonnaise, Parmesan cheese, a spinning bottle of mustard, etc.) plays a boisterous ragtime intro, as Bonnie reappears, now in showbiz attire, to "Thank you all for coming to (her) kitchen."

=== Act 2 ===
"The Stars of the Milky Way" by Dairy Goods and his Stars of the Milky Way
Mr. Dairy Goods is a singing milk carton who emerges from a refrigerator holding an old-fashioned radio-style floor microphone, crooning introductions to three dairy products: Miss Cheese, Miss Yogurt, and Miss Ice Cream - in the style of 1930s costume extravaganzas. Each of the dairy products performs a brief cameo in a stylized manner (e.g., Miss Cheese sings like Mae West, Miss Yogurt sings like a European sex kitten, and Miss Ice Cream sings like Eartha Kitt). Every time they emerge, ice cold fog pours out of the freezer.

=== Act 3 ===
"Boogie Woogie Bakery Boy" by The Cereal Sisters
The Cereal Sisters—Mairzy Oats, Rennie Rice, and Connie Corn—sing a parody of Boogie Woogie Bugle Boy in the style of The Andrews Sisters, accompanied by a bugle-blowing bread slice.

=== Act 4 ===
"Meat Ditties" by Hamm & Eggz
Hamm & Eggz give a vaudeville-style comic rendition of The Meat Group Can Help You Keep Strong, in which Mr. Hamm and Mr. Eggz tell jokes and sing a few short ditties. At the end, Mr. Hamm gets angry because of Mr. Eggz's corny jokes, and decides to split from the duo to join another protein group.

- Mr. Hamm: "There's plenty of good protein acts for me to work with!"
- Mr. Eggz: "Oh yeah? Like who?"
- Mr. Hamm: "Cheese, cheese is a great source of protein!"
- Mr. Eggz: "Oh, I cheddar to think about it."
- Mr. Hamm: "Beans, now there's good..."
- Mr. Eggz: "Beans! Oh nuts to you, hammy!"
- Mr. Hamm: "That's right, nuts to me! Another excellent source of protein".

=== Act 5 ===
"Veggie Veggie Fruit Fruit" by the Colander Combo and the Fiesta Fruit
Night sounds, Latin percussion, and low lighting set the mood for this number, as the produce (broccoli, tomatoes, bananas, etc.) begin to chant "Veggie-Veggie-Fruit-Fruit! Veggie-Veggie-Fruit-Fruit!" Bonnie Appetite, now in a Carmen Miranda-style carnival outfit, and perched upon a crescent moon that descends from the ceiling, sings "I simply have to tell you that my friends who are singing are...delectable!"

=== Finale ===
"Kabaret Finale" by Bonnie Appetite and cast

Bonnie Appetite and the cast sing a medley of each of their songs. All of the cast returns, and Bonnie says good bye, before the curtains with the Kraft logo covers the stage.

== Other appearances ==
Disney created merchandise with the Kitchen Kabaret characters, including coloring books, audio tapes / CDs, musical books, postcards and pins of the Veggie Veggie Fruit Fruit group. Even after closing, the Colander Combo and Fiesta Fruit reappeared as characters in the annual Epcot International Food and Wine Festival.

The Astuter Computer Revue and Backstage Magic in CommuniCore featured a guest appearance by Mr. Eggz highlighting how computers controlled audio-animatronic characters. An educational animated short, "Harold and his Amazing Green Plants" used slightly redesigned versions of the Colander Combo to explain how plants grow.

On August 17, 2007, Walt Disney World released a commemorative pin honoring this attraction as part of its White Glove Remember When series. Another White Glove (a part of the Retro Epcot) pin was released on July 1, 2008.

The song Veggie Veggie Fruit Fruit appeared in the spectacular Epcot Forever.

At the 2021 Destination D23 (Disney) event, the characters of Kitchen Kabaret were featured in a panel on the park specific characters at Walt Disney World. The Kitchen Kabaret was then pitted against Food Rocks in the first ever Battle of the Food Bands. In a shocking upset, Food Rocks emerged victorious. A line of exclusive merchandise featuring the Battle of the Food Bands was released at the event, including a shirt, poster, and pin.

== See also ==
- Epcot
- Epcot attraction and entertainment history

== See also ==
- Epcot
- Epcot attraction and entertainment history
