= Fort Wilderness Railroad =

Former narrow-gauge railroad in Walt Disney World

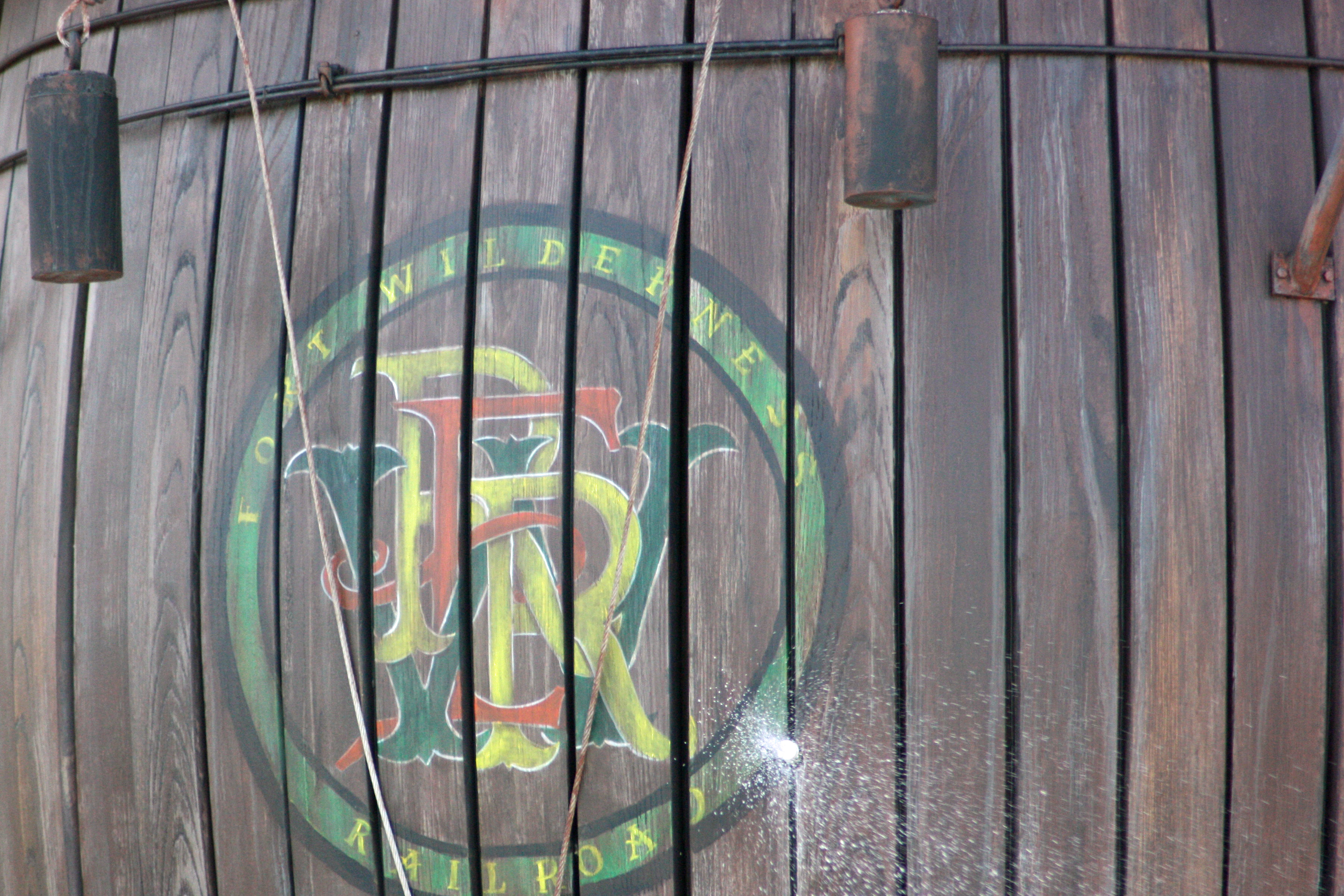
- The logo for the FWRR

Disney's Fort Wilderness Resort & Campground
- Status: Removed
- Opening date: January 1, 1974
- Closing date: February 1980

Ride statistics
- Attraction type: Railroad
- Designer: WED Enterprises
- Speed: 10 mph (16 km/h)
- Vehicles: 4 steam locomotives; 20 passenger cars
- Riders per vehicle: 90 per train

The Fort Wilderness Railroad (FWRR) was a 3.5-mile (5.6 km), 2 ft 6 in (762 mm) narrow-gauge heritage railroad located at Disney's Fort Wilderness Resort & Campground in Walt Disney World. The railroad officially opened on January 1, 1974, and provided transportation for the resort's various campsites. Due to issues with track maintenance, pedestrian safety, noise concerns, and the low fuel capacity of its steam locomotives, the FWRR closed permanently in February 1980. Railroad ties remain in place along certain sections of the railroad's former right-of-way, and its four locomotives and surviving passenger cars are now owned by private collectors.

== History ==
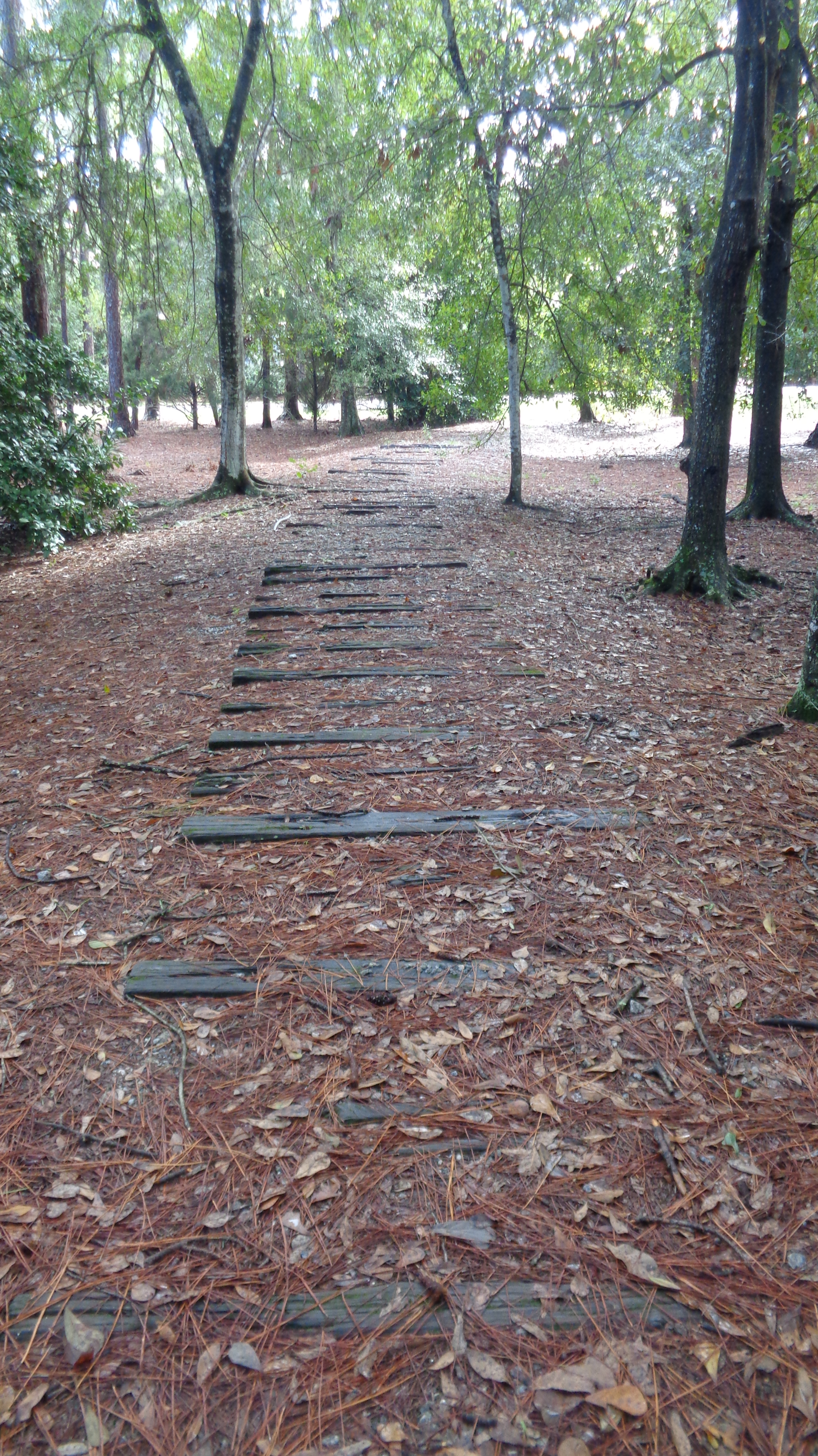
Some portions of the FWRR's former right-of-way are still present.

The 2 ft 6 in (762 mm) narrow-gauge Fort Wilderness Railroad (FWRR) began operating on a trial basis in late 1973 and officially opened on January 1, 1974. Along its 3.5-mile (5.6 km) route, the railroad provided transportation for the various campsites within Walt Disney World's Fort Wilderness Resort & Campground, as well as the nearby Disney's River Country water park. Due to issues with track maintenance, pedestrian safety, noise concerns, and its locomotives' low fuel capacity, the railroad only operated occasionally after 1977 and closed permanently in February 1980. Railroad ties remain in place along certain sections of the railroad's former right-of-way. The FWRR's roundhouse was also converted into a laundry facility.

== Rolling stock ==
The FWRR utilized four 2-4-2ST steam locomotives and twenty passenger cars built in 1972 by WED Enterprises in Glendale, California. After the railroad closed, the locomotives and passenger cars were stored and forgotten for several years until they were rediscovered by Carolwood Pacific Historical Society co-founder Michael Broggie. The locomotives and twelve of the surviving passenger cars were acquired by Carolwood Pacific Historical Society members Jim Zordich of Boring, Oregon (Locomotive No. 1 and one passenger car); Bill Dundas of Camarillo, California (Locomotive No. 2, Locomotive No. 3, and ten passenger cars); and Michael Campbell of Livermore, California (Locomotive No. 4 and one passenger car). Jim Zordich later sold his locomotive and passenger car to Justi Creek Railway owner John Lasseter of Glen Ellen, California, who had them converted to 3 ft (914 mm) gauge. While Locomotive No. 1 and Locomotive No. 4 are static displays, the locomotives owned by Bill Dundas can be found on his private Santa Rosa Valley Railroad, which consists of 2 ft 6 in (762 mm) narrow gauge track as well as 7 1/2 in (190.5 mm) gauge track for the miniature trains he also owns. None of the FWRR locomotives are operational.

In addition, a few of the passenger cars were previously on public display elsewhere in Walt Disney World. Two were used as ticket booths at the Pleasure Island entrance to Downtown Disney prior to its transition into its current form as Disney Springs. They have since been sold at auction to private individuals. Another was previously used as a prop in the Typhoon Lagoon parking lot before it was removed and scrapped.

== See also ==
- Disney Transport
- Rail transport in Walt Disney Parks and Resorts

== Bibliography ==
- Broggie, Michael (2014). Walt Disney's Railroad Story: The Small-Scale Fascination That Led to a Full-Scale Kingdom (4th ed.). The Donning Company Publishers. ISBN 978-1-57864-914-3.
- Kurtti, Jeff (1996). Since the World Began - Walt Disney World: The First 25 Years (1st ed.). Hyperion Books. ISBN 0-7868-6248-3.
- Leaphart, David (2014). Walt Disney World Railroads Part 1: Fort Wilderness Railroad (1st ed.). Steel Wheel on Steel Rail Studio. ISBN 978-1-5008-0522-7.
