= Roger E. Broggie =

American mechanical engineer (1908–1991)

- Born: October 2, 1908; Pittsfield, Massachusetts
- Died: November 4, 1991 (aged 83); Carmel, California
- Occupation: Mechanical engineer
- Years active: 1939–1975

Roger Edward Broggie (October 2, 1908 – November 4, 1991) was an American mechanical engineer. As he worked with Walt Disney and the Walt Disney Company, he is considered the first Disney Imagineer.

== Life and career ==
=== Early life and education ===
Broggie was born in 1908, in Pittsfield, Massachusetts. He graduated from Mooseheart Child City's high school in the western suburbs of Chicago, Illinois in 1927. With vocational machine shop training, he moved to Los Angeles, California where he worked for companies such as Technicolor and Bell and Howell. He worked at General Service Studios with film industry pioneers including David O. Selznick and Charlie Chaplin.

=== Career ===
In 1939, he joined the Disney Studios as a precision machinist. Broggie's initial assignments included installing the multiplane camera at the new Burbank studio, working with Ub Iwerks on special effects. In 1949, Broggie worked with Walt Disney to create model trains for Disney's 1/2 mile-long Carolwood Pacific Railroad located in the backyard of Disney's home. Broggie is credited with supervising the building of the Lilly Belle, a one-eighth scale miniature working live steam locomotive named for Disney's wife, Lillian.

Promoted to head of the Disney Studios Machine Shop in 1950, Broggie became the transportation specialist. He created the special effects for the film 20,000 Leagues Under the Sea and as the plans for Disneyland were developed in the early 1950s, he oversaw development of the Santa Fe & Disneyland Railroad, the Disneyland Monorail, and the Matterhorn Bobsleds at Disneyland. He was instrumental in developing the mechanical aspects of all Disney attractions at Disneyland and Walt Disney World, including the Omnimover ride transit system (with co-developer, Bert Brundage).

He and his machine shop coworkers developed the first fully functioning Audio-Animatronic human figure in the form of a seated Abraham Lincoln in 1963. Between 1973 and 1975, Broggie worked on the EPCOT Center project at Walt Disney World Resort in Florida.

=== Retirement and death ===
After retiring to Carmel, California, he continued to consult for Walt Disney Imagineering. He was named a Disney Legend in 1990 and died on November 4, 1991, at his home in Carmel.

== Tributes ==
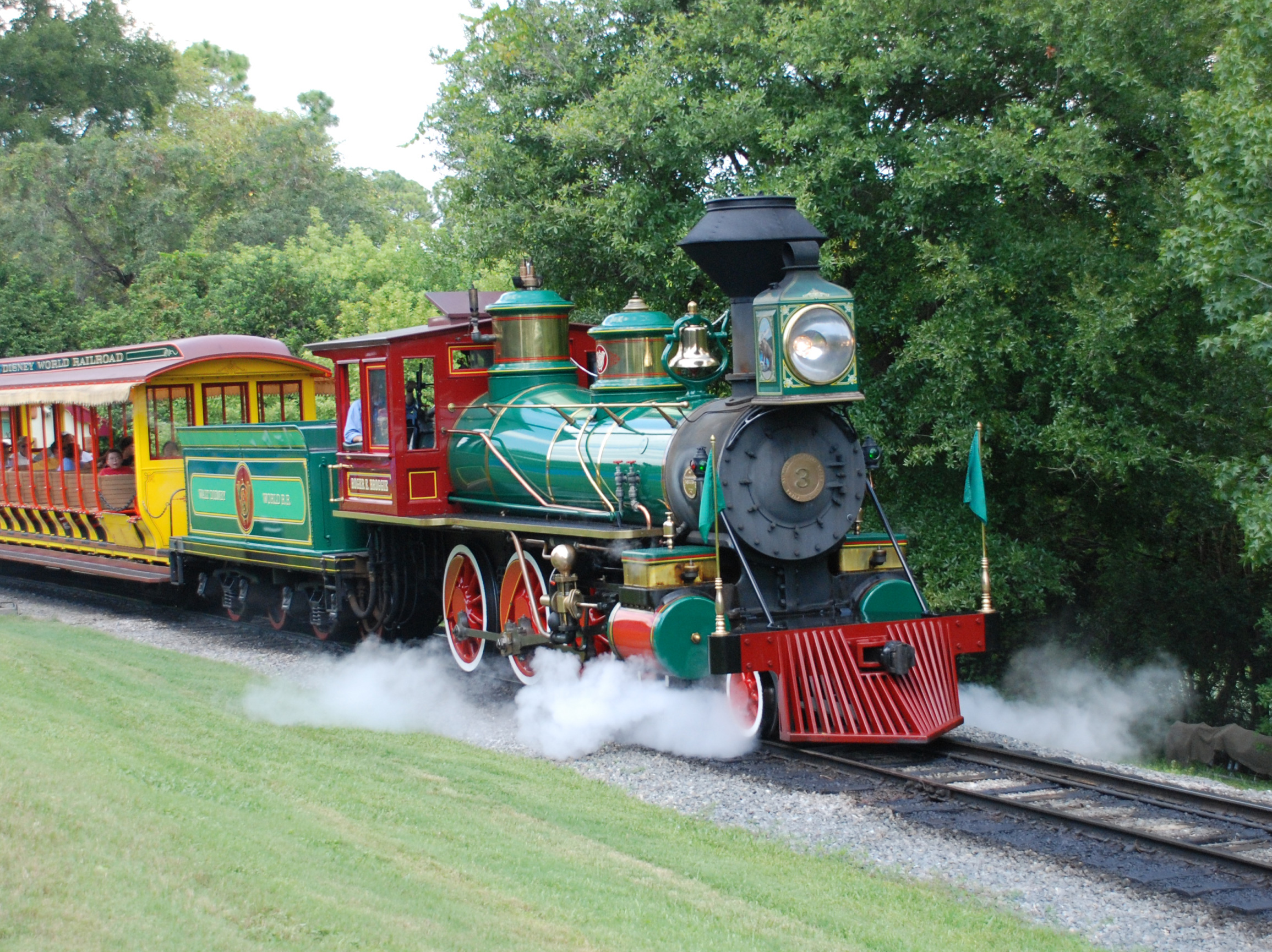
Walt Disney World Railroad No. 3 Roger E. Broggie

The Walt Disney World Railroad's (WDWRR) No. 3 locomotive was named after Broggie. During its rebuild, Broggie did not like the sound of the locomotive's original bell and commented that it "sounded like a hammer hitting an old frying pan." Per advice of Broggie, WDWRR restoration supervisor George Britton secretly swapped out the No. 3 locomotive's original bell with the Liberty Belle stern-wheeler's bell. On October 21, 2003, his sons Michael Broggie and Roger Broggie, Jr rededicated the No. 3 locomotive in honor of their father.

On March 30, 2007, he was honored with a window on Main Street, U.S.A. at Disneyland. The text reads: "Can Do Machine Works / Mechanical Wonders / Live Steam Engines / Magical Illusions / Cameras / Roger Broggie, Shopmaster / Advisor to the Magic Makers".

== See also ==
- Chadwell O'Connor
- Rail transport in Walt Disney Parks and Resorts
