= Grizzly Flats Railroad =

Full-size backyard steam railroad owned by Disney animator Ward Kimball

Coordinates: 34.1187°N 118.0747°W

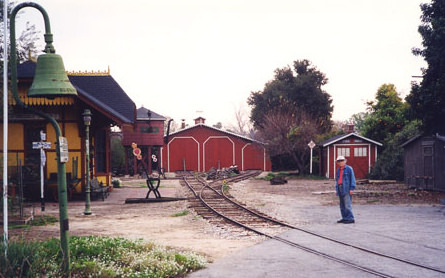
- The GFRR yard with Ward Kimball in the foreground

Overview
- Headquarters: San Gabriel, California
- Dates of operation: 1942–2006

Technical
- Track gauge: 3 ft (914 mm)
- Length: 900 feet (274.3 m)

The Grizzly Flats Railroad (GFRR) was a 3 ft (914 mm) gauge backyard railroad owned by Disney animator Ward Kimball at his home in San Gabriel, California. The railroad had 900 feet (274.3 m) of trackage and operated from 1942 to 2006. It was the first full-size backyard railroad in the United States.

The GFRR was notable for helping Walt Disney rediscover his childhood fascination with trains, which led him to build the Carolwood Pacific Railroad, a ridable miniature railroad in his backyard. The GFRR also influenced the design of the Disneyland Railroad within the Disneyland theme park in Anaheim, California.

The GFRR's rolling stock, including the two steam locomotives owned by Kimball, are now on display at the Southern California Railway Museum (formerly the Orange Empire Railway Museum) in Perris, California. The railroad's depot building and water tower were moved to the Justi Creek Railway, a private railroad owned by John Lasseter.

== History ==
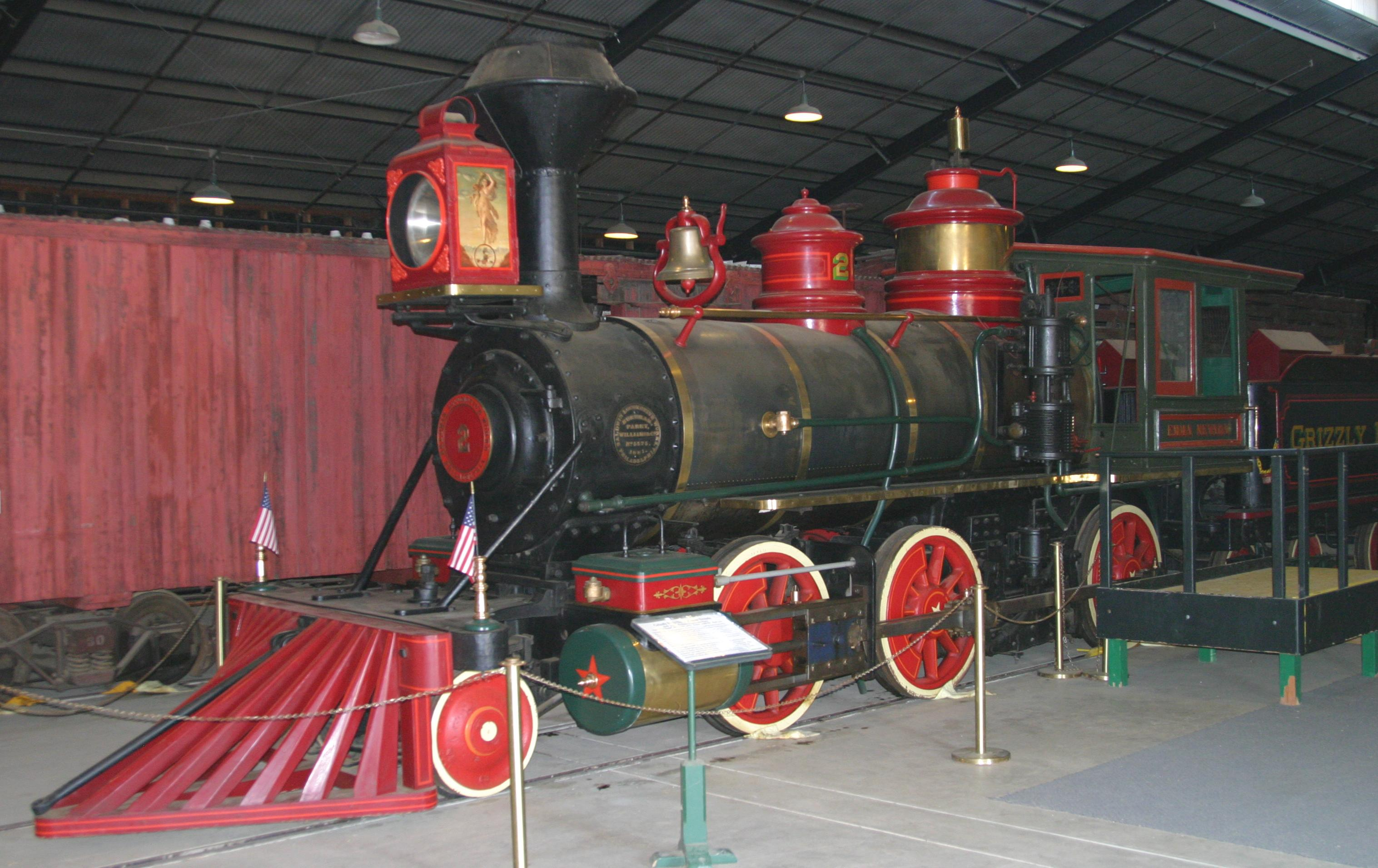
The GFRR's Emma Nevada locomotive on display at the Southern California Railway Museum in 2003

In 1938, Disney animator Ward Kimball, a lifelong railfan, purchased a wooden passenger coach for $50 from the Southern Pacific Railroad (SP), which was scrapping its obsolete narrow-gauge passenger cars. It was built in 1881 by the Barney and Smith Car Company for the Carson and Colorado Railroad, an SP subsidiary from 1900 that operated in the Owens Valley in California. Kimball originally wanted the coach to house his collection of model trains at his home in San Gabriel, California; however, his wife Betty suggested that he should also have a locomotive to pull the coach. Kimball purchased the Sidney Dillon locomotive for $400, preventing it from being sold for scrap in Japan. It was a 2-6-0 steam locomotive built in April 1881 by Baldwin Locomotive Works for the Nevada Central Railroad, which ran between Battle Mountain and Austin, Nevada, until it closed in 1938 due to competition from road vehicles. Kimball paid another $450 to ship the locomotive by rail to the SP workshops in Los Angeles, California, where it successfully passed a boiler test. Afterwards, the Sidney Dillon was moved to Kimball's three-acre backyard, where he, his family, and his friends worked together to overhaul the locomotive. They made replicas of its missing parts and a brand-new cowcatcher.

Kimball's backyard railroad became operational in 1942, although his locomotive was not operational until May 22, 1943. It was renamed Emma Nevada, after the late 1800s opera star Emma Nevada. Kimball named his railroad Grizzly Flats Railroad (GFRR), which eventually consisted of 900 feet (274.3 m) of 3 ft (914 mm) narrow-gauge track, including a 500-foot (152.4 m) mainline. The GFRR became the first full-size backyard railroad in the United States. In 1946, Kimball acquired a boxcar and a caboose, both of which were from the defunct Pacific Coast Railway in San Luis Obispo, California.

In 1948, Kimball purchased a second locomotive, the Pokaa, which was a 0-4-2T steam locomotive built by Baldwin Locomotive Works in 1907, and it originally ran on the Waimanalo Sugar Plantation on the Hawaiian island of Oahu. Kimball renamed the locomotive from Pokaa to Chloe, after one of his daughters. The Chloe had its saddle water tank removed and replaced with a rear water tank bunker. It was also re-equipped with a balloon shaped smokestack to resemble the 1880s Haleakla locomotive. As opposed to the Chloe, which burned wood to generate steam, the Emma Nevada burned coal. In the summer of 1965, the GFRR was filmed for a Brach's TV commercial. Kimball was forced to stop running the Emma Nevada in 1967 due to complaints from his neighbors regarding the coal smoke it created. In the years to follow, Kimball added a cattle car, a gondola, and a velocipede to the GFRR.

The Chloe pulled a set of train cars custom made by Kimball, consisting of a four-bench open car built around 1975 and two passenger-carrying gondolas built around 1993. The cast-iron brackets for the four-bench open car's roof and seats were cast from the same mold used to make the brackets for the Disneyland Railroad's Excursion Train set. Kimball gradually added several structures to the GFRR, including a roundhouse, a water tower, a windmill, and a depot building. The depot building was given to him by his boss, Walt Disney, and was originally used as a set piece for the 1949 Disney film So Dear to My Heart. Kimball died in 2002, but his family continued to operate the GFRR until 2006. The GFRR's tracks were pulled up in late April 2007, but the roundhouse building remained intact.

== Influences and preservation ==
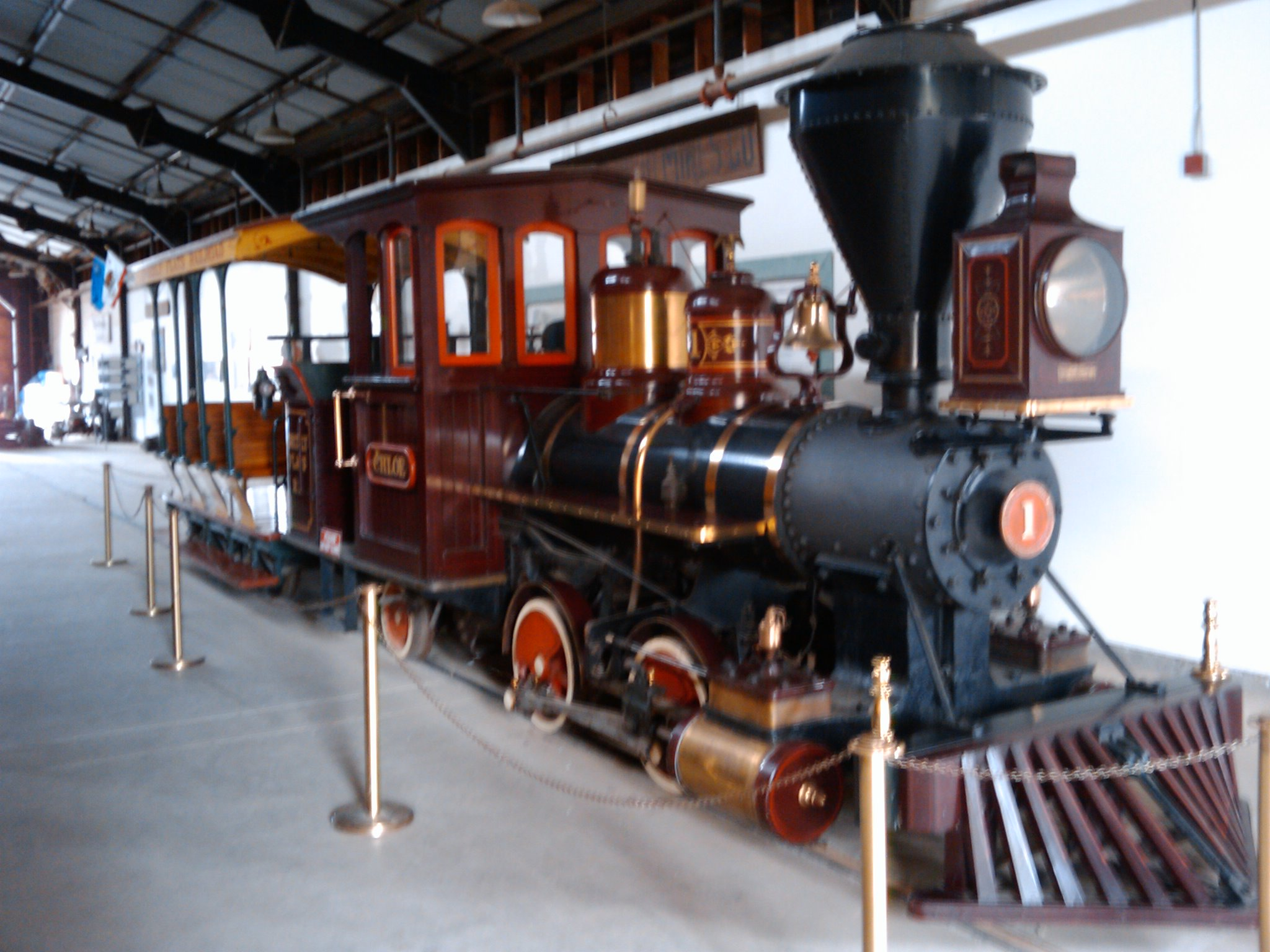
The GFRR's Chloe locomotive on display at the Southern California Railway Museum in 2009

Kimball shared his railroad hobby with fellow Disney animator Ollie Johnston, who owned a ridable miniature railroad, and Walt Disney. On October 20, 1945, Disney attended one of the Kimball's "steam-ups", which were parties hosted at their home when the Grizzly Flats Railroad was in operation. During the party, Disney was given the opportunity to drive the GFRR's Emma Nevada locomotive, which was the first time since working as a teenager on the Missouri Pacific Railway that he had been inside a locomotive cab. Disney eventually decided to have his own backyard railroad built, which he named Carolwood Pacific Railroad. His ridable miniature backyard railroad, and the narrow-gauge GFRR, inspired Disney to create the Disneyland Railroad within the Disneyland theme park in Anaheim, California. The Disneyland Railroad's depot building in the Frontierland section of the park was built using the same blueprints for the GFRR's depot building. Before Kimball's death in 2002, he taught his grandson Nate Lord how to drive the Chloe locomotive, which inspired Lord to become a locomotive engineer on the Disneyland Railroad in 2011.

In late 1992, Kimball began to donate the GFRR's rolling stock, including the Emma Nevada locomotive, to the Southern California Railway Museum (SCRM) in Perris, California. The caboose was donated to the California State Railroad Museum in Sacramento, California. The last of the rolling stock remaining on the GFRR, including the Chloe locomotive, was put on display at the museum in 2007. The Emma Nevada and Chloe locomotives are currently being restored to operating condition. The GFRR's depot building and water tower were acquired by former Pixar film director John Lasseter, who moved them to his private Justi Creek Railway. In September 2018, Märklin went into partnership with the SCRM to fund the Chloe Restoration Project by auctioning some LGB model train products, which resembled the Chloe locomotive and some GFRR rolling stocks.

== See also ==
- Olomana (locomotive)
- Rail transport in Walt Disney Parks and Resorts

== Bibliography ==
- Amendola, Dana (2015). All Aboard: The Wonderful World of Disney Trains (1st ed.). Disney Editions. ISBN 978-1-4231-1714-8.
- Broggie, Michael (2014). Walt Disney's Railroad Story: The Small-Scale Fascination That Led to a Full-Scale Kingdom (4th ed.). The Donning Company Publishers. ISBN 978-1-57864-914-3.
- Wolf, Adolf (1992). Narrow Gauge Railway Scenes (1st ed.). Canadian Caboose Press. ISBN 0-920698-41-7.
