= Carolwood Pacific Railroad =

Ridable miniature backyard steam railroad owned by Walt Disney

Coordinates: 34.0848°N 118.4294°W

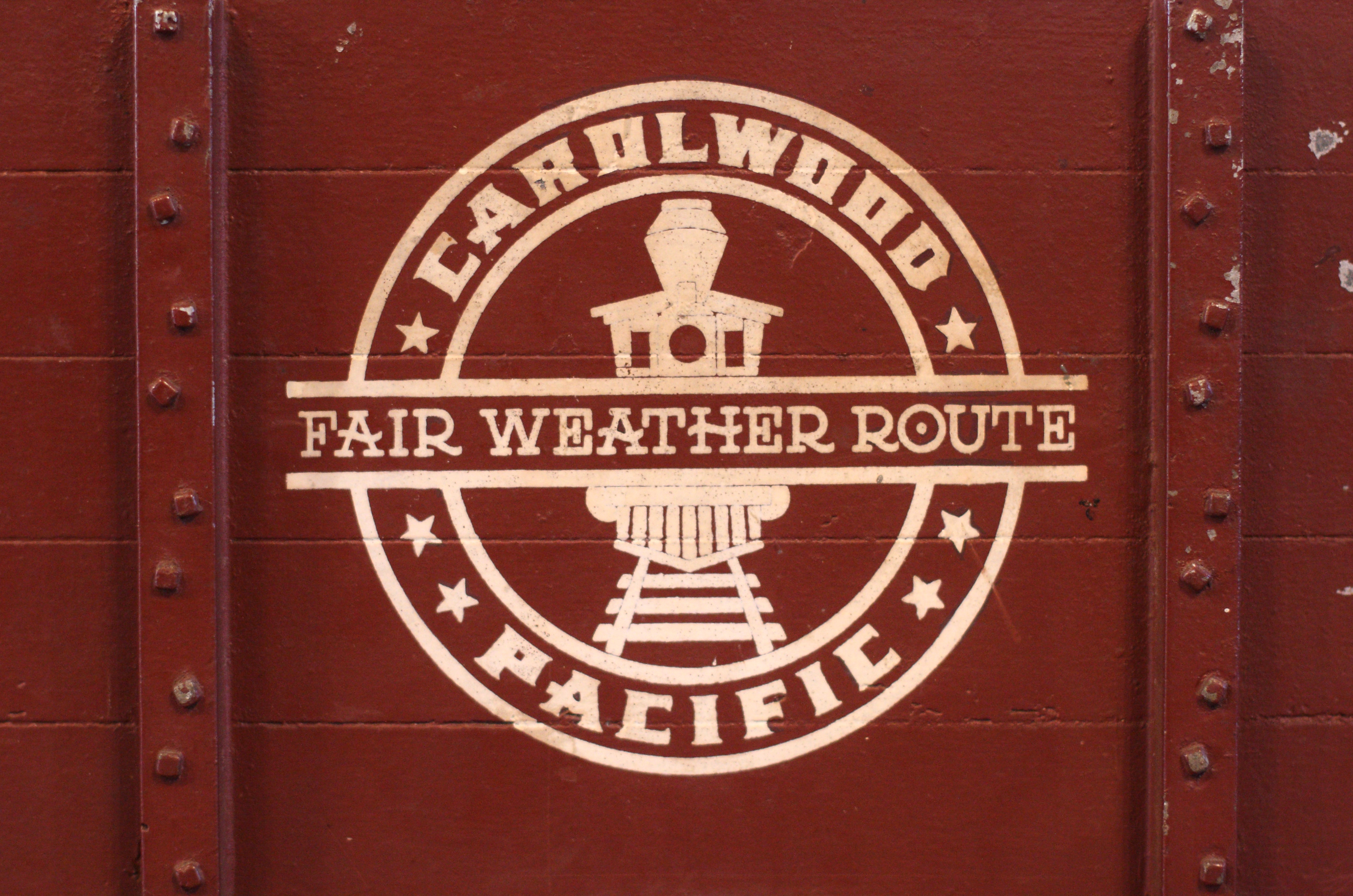
- The logo for the CPRR

Overview
- Headquarters: Holmby Hills, Los Angeles
- Dates of operation: 1950–1953; 73 years ago

Technical
- Track gauge: 7 1/4 in (184 mm)
- Length: 2,615 feet (797 m)

The Carolwood Pacific Railroad (CPRR) was a 7 1/4-inch (184 mm) gauge ridable miniature railroad run by Walt Disney in the backyard of his home in the Holmby Hills neighborhood of Los Angeles, California. It featured the Lilly Belle, a 1:8-scale live steam locomotive named after Disney's wife, Lillian Disney, and built by the Walt Disney Studios' machine shop. The locomotive made its first test run on December 24, 1949. It pulled a set of freight cars, as well as a caboose that was almost entirely built by Disney himself. It was Disney's lifelong fascination with trains, as well as his interest in miniature models, that led to the creation of the CPRR. The railroad, which became operational in 1950, was 2,615 feet (797 m) long and encircled his house. The backyard railroad attracted visitors to Disney's home; he invited them to ride and occasionally drive his miniature train. In 1953, after an accident occurred in which a guest was injured, the CPRR was closed to the public.

The Carolwood Pacific Railroad inspired Disney to include railroad attractions in the design for the Disneyland theme park in Anaheim, California. Railroad attractions in Disney theme parks around the world are now commonplace. The barn structure that was used as the railroad's control center is now at the Los Angeles Live Steamers Railroad Museum (LALSRM) in Los Angeles' Griffith Park. The Lilly Belle, some of the freight cars, and the caboose are now on display at the Walt Disney Family Museum in San Francisco, California.

== History ==
The layout of the CPRR

Walt Disney was a rail enthusiast. As a young boy, he wanted to become a train engineer like his father's cousin, Mike Martin, who drove main line trains on the Atchison, Topeka and Santa Fe Railway. Disney's father, Elias, once worked as part of a track installation crew for the Union Pacific Railroad. As a teenager, Disney worked as a news butcher on the Missouri Pacific Railway, where he sold newspapers, candy, cigars, and other products on trains. He sometimes climbed over the tender and into the locomotive's cab while the train was in motion. After he bribed the engineer and fireman with chewing tobacco, they showed him how to operate the locomotive.

Disney renewed his interest in trains after injuries forced him to stop playing polo. Seeking a calmer recreational activity, he purchased several Lionel train sets in late 1947. By 1948, his interest in model trains was evolving into an interest in larger, ridable miniature trains after observing the trains and backyard railroad layouts of several hobbyists. These hobbyists included Disney animators like Ollie Johnston, who had a ridable miniature railroad; as well as Ward Kimball, who owned the full-size, 3 ft (914 mm) narrow-gauge Grizzly Flats Railroad.

On June 1, 1949, Disney purchased 5 acres (2.0 ha) of vacant land in the Holmby Hills area of Los Angeles. The property consisted of a bluff, which was 2 acres (0.8 ha) in size, and a level shelf of land behind it, which Disney named Yensid Valley. The word Yensid is Disney spelled backwards. Disney purchased this land to build a new family home with an elaborate backyard railroad behind it. Plans for the railroad's layout included 2,615 feet (797 m) of 7 1/4-inch (184 mm) gauge track with eleven switches, as well as gradients, overpasses, a trestle, and an elevated dirt berm. The layout would completely surround the house. Disney's wife, Lillian Disney, objected to the plan that part of the layout be built in an area where she intended to plant a flower garden. As a compromise, Disney had an S-curve tunnel built underneath the spot where the garden was eventually planted. Aided by a Walt Disney Studios attorney, Disney had a tongue-in-cheek legal contract written to establish his right to own and operate the railroad's right of way. He and his wife signed the contract and their two daughters witnessed it. Disney named his railroad Carolwood Pacific Railroad (CPRR) in reference to his address at 355 Carolwood Drive. The railroad eventually cost $50,000, split evenly between its layout and rolling stock.

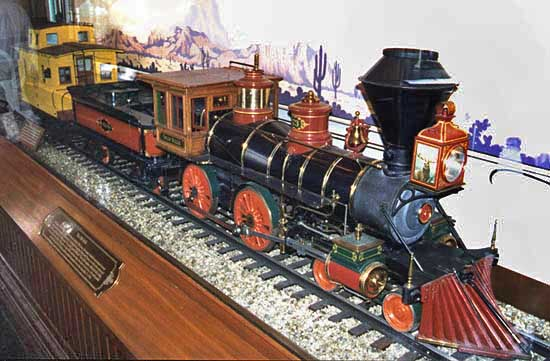
The CPRR's Lilly Belle and caboose on display at the Disneyland Railroad's Main Street, USA Station in 1993

The railroad featured the Lilly Belle, a 1:8-scale live steam locomotive named after Disney's wife and built by the Walt Disney Studios' machine shop team led by Roger E. Broggie. The locomotive's design, chosen by Disney after seeing a smaller locomotive model with the same design at the home of rail historian Gerald M. Best, was based directly on copies of the blueprints for the Central Pacific No. 173, a 4-4-0 steam locomotive rebuilt by the Central Pacific Railroad in 1872. The initials for the Carolwood Pacific Railroad, CPRR, matched the initials for the Central Pacific, one of the railroads that helped complete the first transcontinental railroad in 1869. Under Broggie's guidance, Disney helped build several parts for the Lilly Belle, including its smokestack and headlamp. Most of the machining was done by Broggie's machine shop team, and the wooden cab was built by Disney personally. On December 24, 1949, the Lilly Belle and its tender were first test run on a small loop of track during the studio's Christmas party in front of the staff. The tender could carry up to 3.5 US gallons (13.2 L) of water and 10 pounds (4.5 kg) of coal crushed to scale-sized lumps to fuel the locomotive. Disney ran the Lilly Belle on the Carolwood Pacific Railroad for the first time on May 7, 1950.

The CPRR's train cars consisted of six cast-metal, woodgrain-patterned gondolas made by the studio's machine shop. There were also two boxcars, two stock cars, a flatcar, and a caboose made of wood from the studio's prop shop. Disney's fascination with miniature models was apparent from the level of detail he applied to the miniature interior of the caboose, which included a calendar hung on the wall, a broom, and a working potbelly stove. Except for its frame and trucks, Disney built the entire caboose himself. All of the train cars, except for the caboose, were stored in the CPRR's tunnel when not in use.

The CPRR's caboose was stored in a special barn where Disney monitored and controlled the CPRR's track. The barn's design was based on a set piece for the 1949 Disney film So Dear to My Heart, and it brought back Disney's childhood memories of a similar barn on his family farm in Marceline, Missouri. The barn had a centralized traffic control board, which had several lights designed to indicate the presence of trains along the railroad's route. The CPRR's switches could also be electrically controlled from this board.

Articles about the CPRR appeared in several magazines, including the September 1951 issue of Look magazine. These articles attracted visitors interested in the CPRR to the home of Disney, who invited them to ride and occasionally drive his miniature train. With a tractive effort of more than 2,000 pounds-force (8,900 N), the Lilly Belle could pull a train with up to 12 adult passengers. Due to its lack of brakes, the locomotive was set in reverse if it ever needed to stop quickly. In early 1953, a visitor drove the Lilly Belle too fast along a curve, causing it to derail. As a result, the locomotive fell on its side, broke its whistle, and released a jet of steam across the ground. A five-year-old girl ran through the steam jet, which left minor burns on her legs. As a result of this incident, Disney, fearing the possibility of future accidents, closed down the CPRR and stored the locomotive in the studio's machine shop. Disney removed the Carolwood Pacific Railroad's trackage in 1964.

== Influences ==
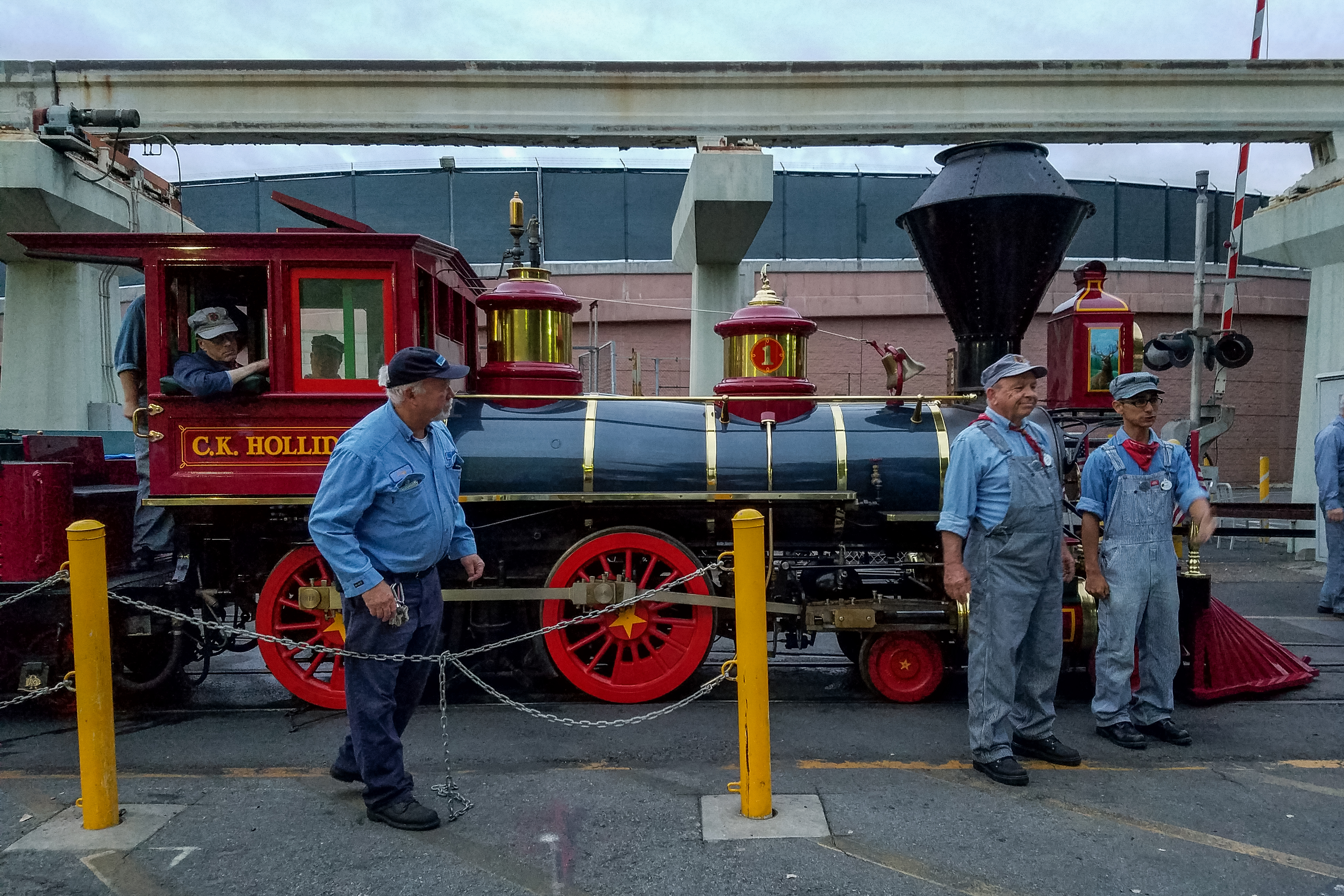
The Disneyland Railroad's C.K. Holliday locomotive is very similar in appearance to the CPRR's Lilly Belle locomotive

Disney credited the Carolwood Pacific Railroad with inspiring the creation of Disneyland in Anaheim, California. In one early concept for the park, the CPRR was included as an attraction, in which its train would carry passengers past miniature towns and settings. The Casey Jr. Circus Train, a different ridable miniature railroad that travels past miniature scenes of animated Disney films, is one of Disneyland's original attractions. Another early design for the park included a narrow-gauge steam railroad encircling it, a feature which was retained in the park's final design. Disneyland, and the Disneyland Railroad encircling the park, opened on July 17, 1955. The Disneyland Railroad's No. 1 locomotive, the C.K. Holliday, bears a strong resemblance to the CPRR's Lilly Belle, since their designs were based on the same blueprints. There are also steam railroads in the Magic Kingdom at Walt Disney World near Orlando, Florida; Tokyo Disneyland in Japan; and Disneyland Park near Paris.

Copies of the blueprints for the CPRR's Lilly Belle were sold to model railroad hobbyists through a company named Walt Disney Miniature Railroad, formed by Disney in 1950 as a legally separate entity from Walt Disney Productions. After that company evolved into Walt Disney, Inc., in 1952 and had its name changed to WED Enterprises in 1953, it developed rides and attractions for Disneyland and later Walt Disney World. In 1965, Walt Disney Productions purchased WED Enterprises, and in 1986 changed its name to Walt Disney Imagineering. According to Los Angeles magazine, the CPRR's barn has been referred to as the "birthplace of Imagineering."

As well as inspiring rail attractions at Disney theme parks, the CPRR became the inspiration for the 1951 Disney animated short film Out of Scale, in which Donald Duck is portrayed running a ridable miniature railroad in his backyard. The train of the CPRR also appeared in several Disney television specials in the 1950s. The Walt Disney World Railroad's Fantasyland Station area is nicknamed Carolwood Park, paying tribute to the CPRR.

== Preservation ==
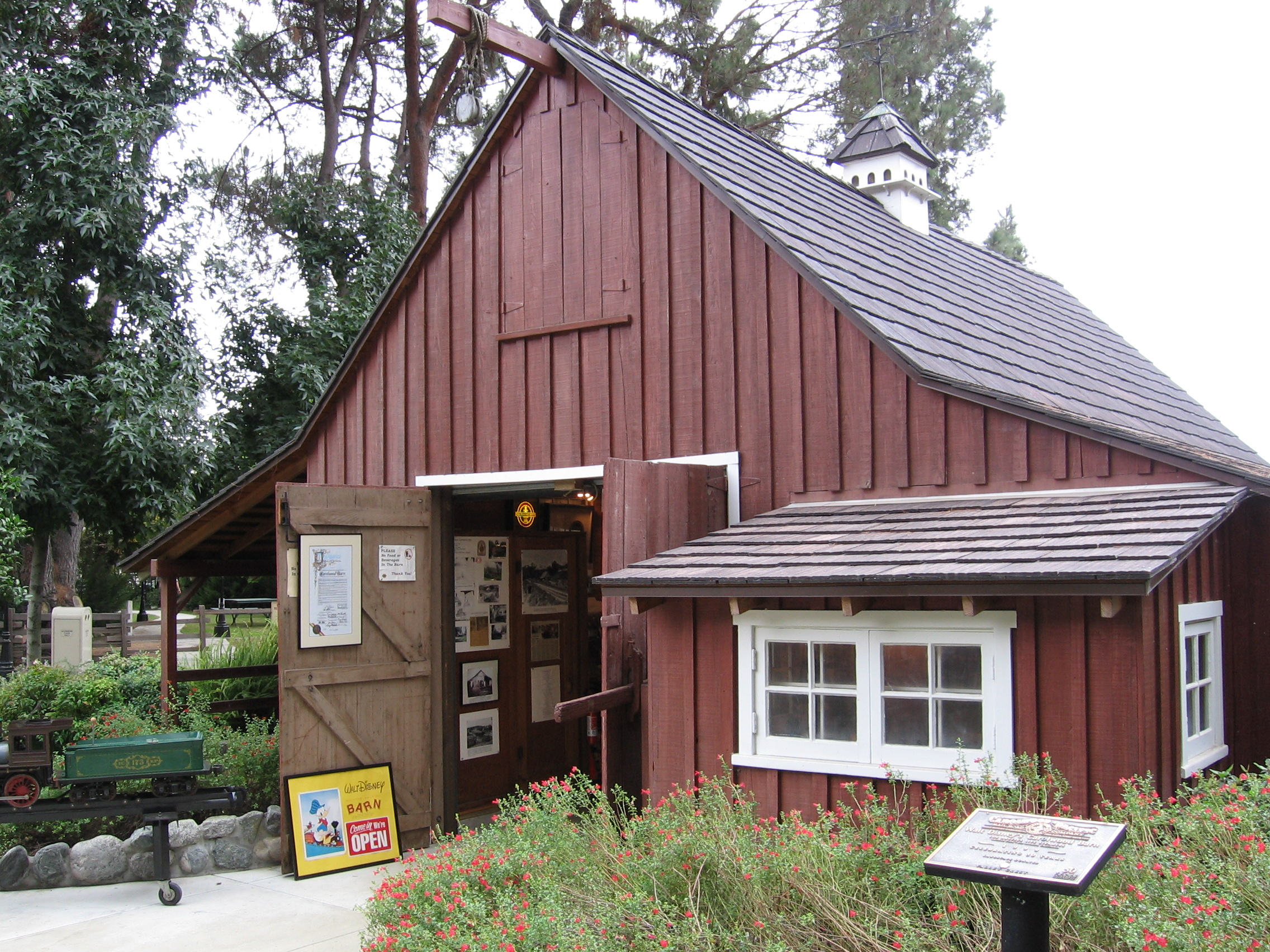
Disney's Carolwood Barn preserved at the LALSRM

In 1965, Disney donated 1,500 feet (457 m) of the Carolwood Pacific Railroad's track, as well as the railroad's trestle, to the Los Angeles Live Steamers, a group of miniature steam train enthusiasts. Disney was a charter member of that group. The completion of the CPRR's track installation at the Los Angeles Live Steamers Railroad Museum (LALSRM) in Los Angeles' Griffith Park was celebrated on October 22, 1966, and the route utilizing that track became known as the Disney Loop. This event occurred a few weeks before Disney's death on December 15, 1966. In 1968, Lillian Disney donated the rest of the CPRR's track to the Los Angeles Live Steamers. The original CPRR track on the Disney Loop has since been removed and replaced with newer, more durable track.

After Lillian died in 1997, the Disney residence, including the area where the CPRR was located, was put up for sale. Mexican investor Gabriel Brener, who bought the property in 1998, demolished the original house due to issues with lead paint, lead piping, asbestos, and a weak foundation. The CPRR's tunnel was still in place in 2013. In 2014, the property was sold to an unknown buyer.

In 1999, Disney's Carolwood Barn, the CPRR's former control center, was relocated to the Los Angeles Live Steamers Railroad Museum. Morgan "Bill" Evans, the original landscaper of the Disney residence and several Disney theme parks, arranged for Walt Disney Imagineering to provide a landscaping plan for the barn's new site. On July 19, Diane Disney Miller, Disney's daughter, participated in the rededication ceremony for the barn.

Since 2009, the CPRR's Lilly Belle, some of the freight cars, and the caboose have been on display at the Walt Disney Family Museum in San Francisco, California. There are also two pieces of CPRR rolling stock on display inside the Carolwood Pacific Railroad Room in the Boulder Ridge Villas at Disney's Wilderness Lodge within Walt Disney World.

== See also ==
- Olomana (locomotive)

== Bibliography ==
- Amendola, Dana (2015). All Aboard: The Wonderful World of Disney Trains (1st ed.). Disney Editions. ISBN 978-1-4231-1714-8.
- Barrier, Michael (2007). The Animated Man: A Life of Walt Disney (1st ed.). University of California Press. ISBN 978-0-520-24117-6.
- Broggie, Michael (2014). Walt Disney's Railroad Story: The Small-Scale Fascination That Led to a Full-Scale Kingdom (4th ed.). The Donning Company Publishers. ISBN 978-1-57864-914-3.
- Danilov, Victor J. (2013). Famous Americans: A Directory of Museums, Historic Sites, and Memorials. Scarecrow Press. ISBN 978-0-8108-9185-2.
- Mannheim, Steve (2016). Walt Disney and the Quest for Community (2nd ed.). Routledge. ISBN 978-0-7546-1974-1.
- Stephens, E.J.; Wanamaker, Marc (2011). Griffith Park. Images of America (1st ed.). Arcadia Publishing. ISBN 978-0-7385-8883-4.
- Veness, Susan (2015). The Hidden Magic of Walt Disney World: Over 600 Secrets of the Magic Kingdom, Epcot, Disney's Hollywood Studios, and Disney's Animal Kingdom (2nd ed.). Adams Media. ISBN 978-1-4405-8780-1.
