= Michael Broggie =

American historian

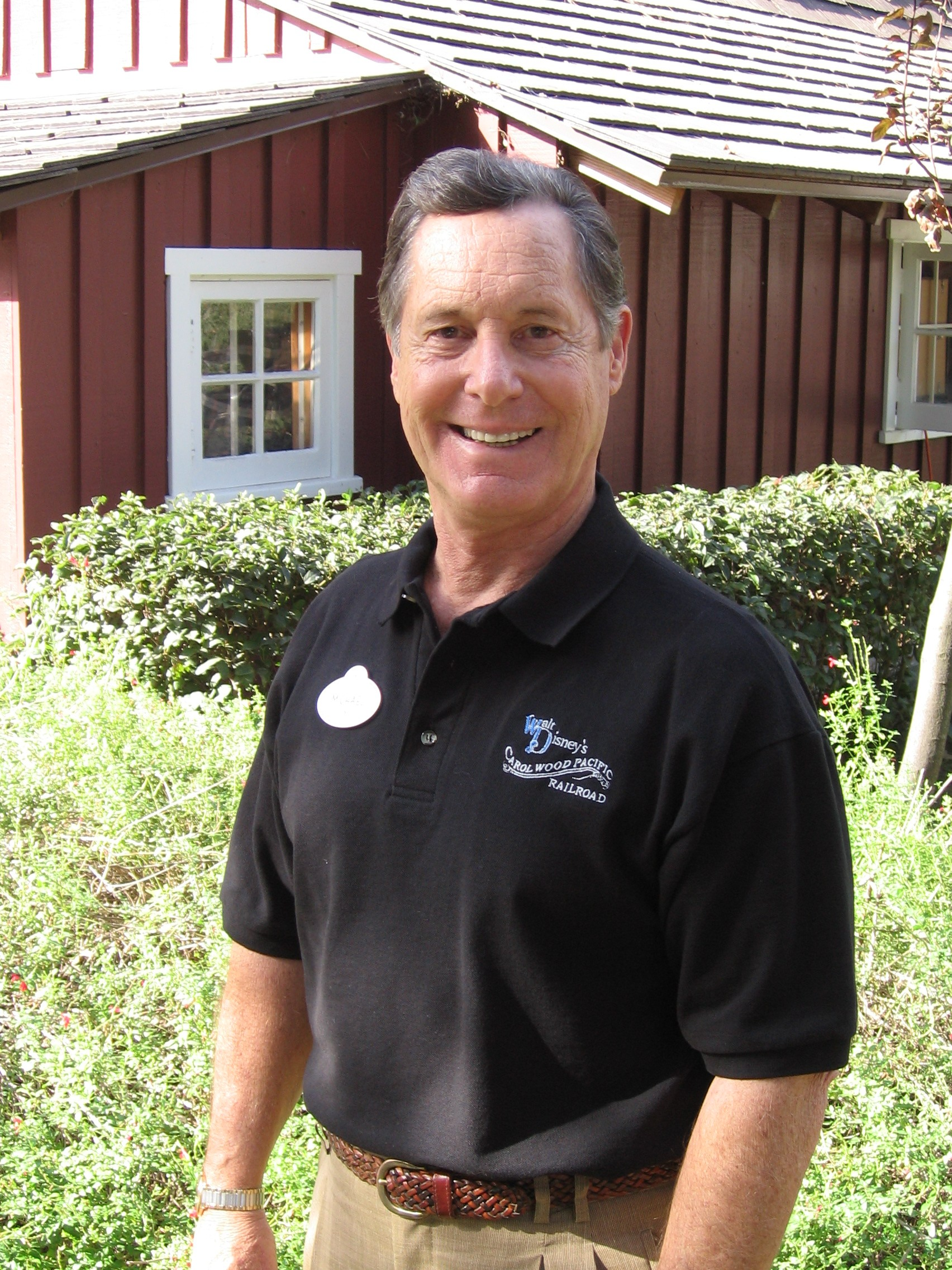
- Michael Broggie at Walt Disney's Carolwood Barn Griffith Park, L.A.
- Born: June 19, 1942 (age 84); Los Angeles, California, U.S.
- Occupations: Author and historian
- Notable work: Walt Disney's Railroad Story
- Spouse: Sharon Charmagne
- Children: 2, 1 stepson
- Parents: Roger E. Broggie (father); Thelma C. Broggie (mother)
- Website: carolwood.com

Michael Broggie (born June 19, 1942) is an American author and historian who specializes in the history of Walt Disney and The Walt Disney Company—specifically Disney's connection to railroads. He is the son of Roger E. Broggie, who was selected by Walt Disney to be the first Imagineer.

== Early life and education ==
Broggie was born in Los Angeles, California on June 19, 1942 and grew up between Lake Arrowhead and the San Fernando Valley. His father was Roger E. Broggie, an engineer, machinist, and head of Walt Disney Studio machine shop.

As a small child, Broggie spent many Sundays in the backyard of Walt Disney's home in the Holmby Hills neighborhood of Los Angeles. He helped Walt and his father operate the 1/8-scale Carolwood Pacific Railroad—the model railroad layout which his father helped build. On June 18, 1955, about a month before the opening of Disneyland Park, 12-year-old Broggie assisted Walt Disney and his father with the steam up of the E.P. Ripley—one of the locomotives of the Disneyland Railroad. He also test-drove cars designed for the park's Autopia attraction.

Broggie earned an MBA and a doctorate in marketing (summa cum laude) at Pacific University, San Diego; a BA in communications from California State University, Northridge; and an AA in Journalism (with honors) from Los Angeles Valley College. He attended Lincoln University School of Law, San Francisco.

== Professional career ==
After three years at Rim of the World High School at Lake Arrowhead, he graduated from North Hollywood High School in 1960. Broggie worked his way through college as an attractions Cast Member (ride operator) at Disneyland on the Autopia and Mine Train Through Nature's Wonderland during the summer seasons. After completing his undergraduate education, he joined the Walt Disney Studios in Burbank, California, as a publicity writer in the motion picture marketing department.

Broggie's career led to management and consulting positions with Marriott, Boise Cascade, and General Motors. For three years in the early 1970s, he returned to his hometown of Lake Arrowhead and served as the executive vice president and general manager of Lake Arrowhead Development Company. Under his administration, the lake was transferred to a community corporation owned in common by area property owners. Broggie also served on the ABC sponsorship team for the 1984 Summer Olympic Games in Los Angeles.

Broggie then focused on his connection to Disney and began researching Walt Disney's lifelong connections with trains—culminating in the publication of Walt Disney's Railroad Story in 1997. With his late wife, Sharon, he is co-founder and chairman of The Carolwood Society and chairman emeritus of the non-profit Carolwood Foundation. The foundation operates Walt Disney's Carolwood Barn within the Los Angeles Live Steamers Railroad Museum in Griffith Park on behalf of the Walt Disney Family Foundation.

On behalf of the model railroad industry, Broggie appeared in 30 cities as the featured presenter of “Walt Disney's Railroad Story” on a national tour titled “World's Greatest Hobby.”

Broggie is also a veteran of the United States Air Force, where he served as a medic and pharmacy specialist in the Aerospace Medical Command.

== Author ==
Broggie is the author or co-author of eight books—both Disney and non-Disney in subject matter. Walt Disney’s Railroad Story was awarded in 1998 with the Benjamin Franklin Gold Medal for Best Biography from the Publishers Marketing Association (PMA).

In addition to his books, Broggie has authored and edited numerous articles for regional and national publications, and is currently doing research for his autobiography. Broggie is also the author of the official souvenir guide to the Ronald Reagan Presidential Library and Museum in Simi Valley, California.

== Personal life ==
Broggie supports a variety of charitable and non-profit causes in Arizona. Broggie is a member of the Westlake Yacht Club, he was founder and initial CEO of The Nautical Foundation, a non-profit corporation that raises funds to promote the values and opportunities of youth and competitive sailing. He is also co-founder and past president of the Prescott Police Foundation. He and Sharon served eight years as volunteers in the Prescott Police Department's unit of Citizens on Patrol (COP). He was appointed to three terms on the appeals board of the Prescott Fire Department, the last term as chairman ended in 2020. Broggie was appointed as a board member of the City of Prescott Charter Review Committee by Mayor Cathey Rusing in 2026.

== Published works ==
=== As author ===
- Walt Disney's Railroad Story
- Walt Disney's Happy Place
- Walt Disney's Words of Wisdom
- The History of Irwindale: Jardin de Roca (Garden of Rocks)
- Ronald Reagan Presidential Library Souvenir Book

=== As co-author ===
Air Force One: The Final Mission

=== As contributor ===
Poor Charlie's Almanack: The Wit and Wisdom of Charles T. Munger

== See also ==
- Rail transport in Walt Disney Parks and Resorts

== Sources ==
- Broggie, Michael (2006). Walt Disney's Railroad Story. Marceline, Missouri, Virginia Beach, Virginia: The Donning Company Publishers, Walsworth Publishing Company. ISBN 1-57864-309-0
- The Carolwood Society Website

Famous People of Prescott, Arizona (Website of the City of Prescott, AZ)
