= Lasseter Family Winery =

Winery located in Glen Ellen, Sonoma County, California

Coordinates: 38.383186°N 122.524988°W

- Location: Glen Ellen, Sonoma County, California, United States
- Appellation: Sonoma Valley
- Founded: 2000
- Key people: John Lasseter
- Area cultivated: 27 acres
- Varietals: Cabernet Sauvignon, Cabernet Franc, Merlot, Malbec, Syrah, Grenache, Mourvèdre
- Distribution: Limited production
- Tasting: By appointment
- Website: www.lasseterfamilywinery.com

Lasseter Family Winery is a winery located in Glen Ellen, Sonoma County, California. The winery was founded in 2000 by Pixar film director John Lasseter and his wife, Nancy Lasseter. The winery, once operated by the Grand Cru Winery, produces approximately 1,200 cases of French red wine blends annually, with the capacity to produce up to 6,000.

The winery grows Bordeaux and Rhône varietals on 27 acres (11 ha). One of the Lasseters' winemaking mentors was Jess Jackson, of Kendall-Jackson.

== History ==
In 2000, after several years of amateur wine-making, the Lasseters bought 50 bare acres in Glen Ellen and planted syrah, grenache and mourvedre Rhône varieties. They bought an adjoining 35-acre (14 ha) property in 2002 with merlot and cabernet sauvignon grapes, then added malbec and cabernet franc to create French red wine blends.

Five years later, Julia Iantosca joined the Lasseters as a winemaker. Iantosca had spent time as the winemaker at Stevenot Vineyards in Murphys, William Wheeler Winery and Lambert Bridge Winery, both in Healdsburg, and worked closely with consulting winemaker Merry Edwards, who helped inspire Iantosca's love of blended wines.

Later that same year, they unveiled their eco-friendly, state-of-the-art winery and began accepting visitors by appointment only.

== Justi Creek Railway ==
The Justi Creek Railway is a private, 3 ft (914 mm) narrow-gauge railroad that runs through the winery's Syrah vineyard. A trademark for the railroad's name was filed by the Lasseter family through a trust in 2010, but was abandoned in 2013.

An H.K. Porter steam locomotive built in 1901, the Marie E. is used for traction, and can pull a small gondola and caboose. The Marie E. and its consist were once owned by Ollie Johnston, one of Walt Disney's Nine Old Men, and originally ran on Johnston's private Deer Lake Park & Julian Railroad until they were sold in 1993. The train was sold to John Lasseter around 2002. On May 10, 2005, the Marie E. locomotive and its caboose became the first privately owned rolling stock allowed to run on the Disneyland Railroad. This occurred during a private ceremony to honor Ollie Johnston, and allowed him to reunite with and drive his former locomotive. In May 2007 and again in June 2010, the locomotive (driven by John Lasseter) visited the Pacific Coast Railroad in Santa Margarita, California where it operated alongside the original Disneyland Railroad Retlaw 1 coaches. On July 28, 2017, Lasseter again drove the Marie E. locomotive on the Disneyland Railroad as part of festivities that marked the railroad's reopening after a year-long closure for construction of Star Wars: Galaxy's Edge, this time pulling the locomotive Chloe and a train car from the Southern California Railway Museum, (SCRM), formerly the Orange Empire Railway Museum, (OERM), in Perris, California.

Chloe and the train car were previously owned by Ward Kimball, another one of the Nine Old Men, and ran on the Grizzly Flats Railroad located in his backyard. Chloe was donated to the SCRM in 2006 and arrived there in 2007. The Grizzly Flats Railroad also consisted of a water tower and depot. They were sold to John Lasseter in 2007. The depot building was originally built as a set piece for the 1949 Disney film So Dear to My Heart.

== See also ==
- Rail transport in Walt Disney Parks and Resorts

== Bibliography ==
- Amendola, Dana (2015), All Aboard: The Wonderful World of Disney Trains (1st ed.), Disney Editions, ISBN 978-1-4231-1714-8
