= Walt Disney's Carolwood Barn =

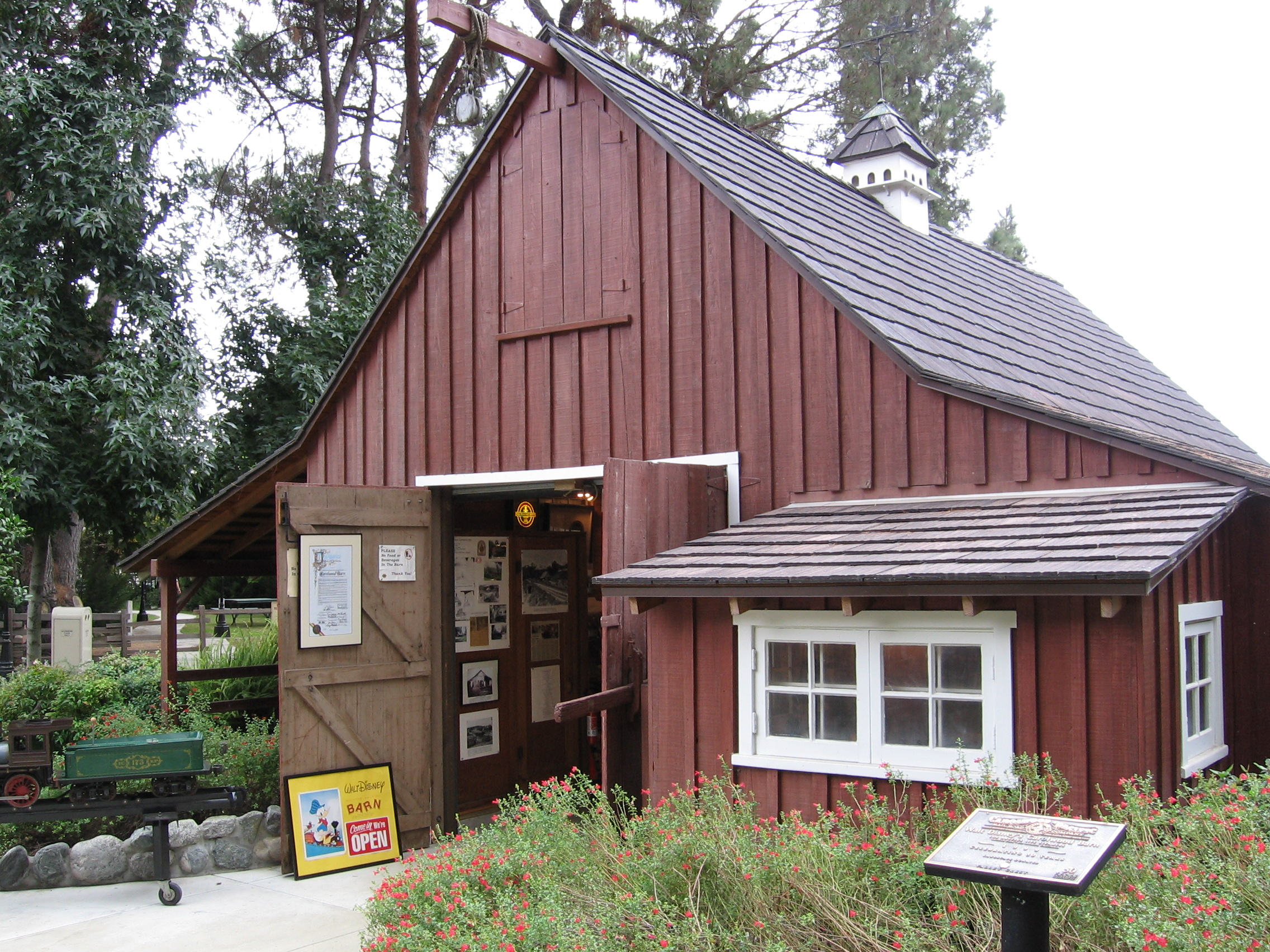
- Established: July 18, 1999
- Location: 5202 Zoo Drive, Los Angeles Live Steamers Railroad Museum, Griffith Park, Los Angeles, California, United States
- Type: Railroad museum
- Founder: Diane Disney Miller, Michael Broggie
- Architect: John V. Cowles, Miguel Fernandez
- Owner: The Walt Disney Family Foundation, Carolwood Foundation, Los Angeles Live Steamers Railroad Museum
- Nearest parking: On site (no charge)
- Website: carolwood.org

Walt Disney's Carolwood Barn is a museum located within the Los Angeles Live Steamers Railroad Museum (LALSRM) complex on the northern side of Griffith Park in Los Angeles, California. The barn, which was originally located in the backyard of Walt Disney's Holmby Hills home, features artifacts and displays related to Disney and his lifelong fascination with trains. The barn and surrounding exhibits are open to the public the third Sunday of each month, free of charge.

== History ==
Walt Disney was an avid railroad enthusiast and trains played a big role in his life and career. In June 1949, Disney and his wife Lillian purchased a five-acre tract of land in the Holmby Hills neighborhood of Los Angeles to build a new home for his family, as well as a miniature train layout that went completely around the new home. Disney named his railroad the Carolwood Pacific (CPRR) in reference to the new home's street address: 355 North Carolwood Drive.

Disney ran his 1/8 scale steam train Lilly Belle (named for his wife) along the Carolwood Pacific's 2,615 feet of track for three years (1950–1953). In addition to the railroad, Disney also had a miniature red barn built in the backyard. The barn was designed by Disney Studio architect John V. Cowles, and was based on a barn Disney remembered from his family's farm in Marceline, Missouri when he was a child. It became his machine shop, where he would work on the Lilly Belle and its rolling stock during his downtime at home. The barn was also the railroad's control center and housed the layout's electronic track switchboard.

The barn is often referred to as "the birthplace of Imagineering" because the time Disney spent there was one of his inspirations for the design of Disneyland Park in Anaheim, California—the first Disney Park (Walt Disney Imagineering, originally called WED Enterprises, is the firm that designs the Disney theme parks and resorts). When Disneyland opened in July 1955, one of the original attractions was a railroad that circumnavigated the park's perimeter, which still operates today. And other train-related attractions have come and gone over the decades, such as the Casey Jr. Circus Train and the Disneyland Monorail.

When the Disney family sold the Carolwood property in 1998 following the death of Lillian Disney the previous December, Diane Disney Miller, the Disneys' eldest daughter, requested that the barn be relocated. Diane and Disney historian Michael Broggie entered into an agreement with the city of Los Angeles and the Los Angeles Live Steamers Railroad Museum to have the barn rebuilt on the LALSRM property in Griffith Park as a museum dedicated to Disney's love of trains and the impact trains had on his life and work. The location was well suited, as Walt Disney was a charter member of LALSRM.

Dismantled and rebuilt piece by piece at Griffith Park, the structure is about 80% original, with a replacement roof and other changes necessary to bring the barn up to modern fire and building codes. Architect Miguel Fernandez updated John Cowles' original drawings, though Fernandez remarked that Cowles' work was so good that it only required slight adjustments for the city to approve. Fernandez worked with general contractor Bill Abel on the reconstruction and reinforcement of the barn. Disney Legend Morgan "Bill" Evans, the original landscaper of the Disney residence and several Disney theme parks, arranged for Walt Disney Imagineering to provide a landscaping plan for the barn's new site.

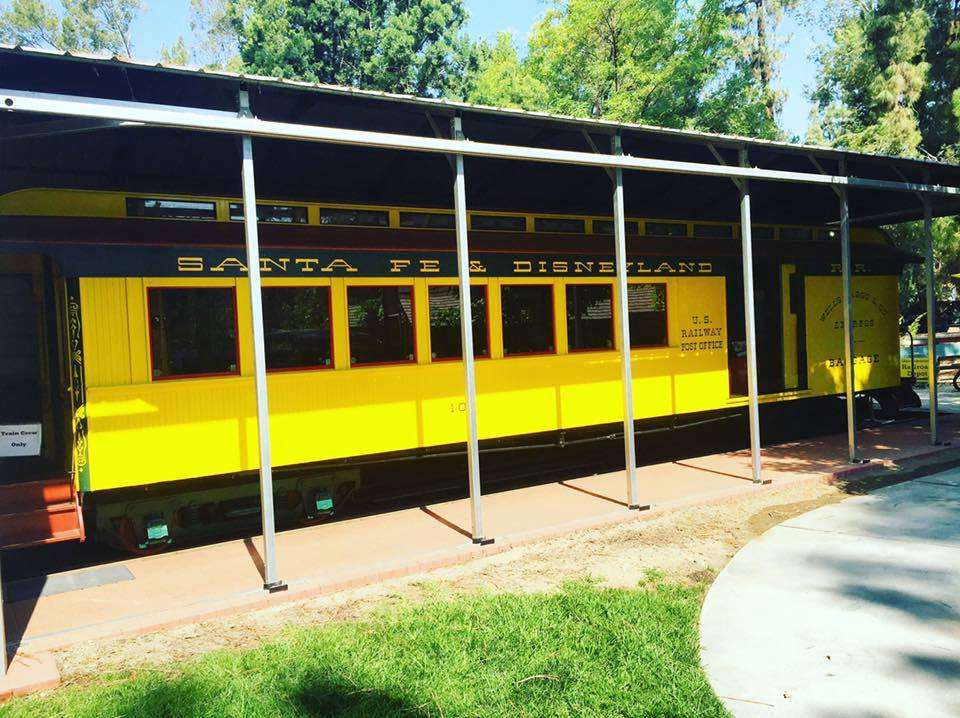
Disneyland Railroad combine car display.

Renamed Walt Disney's Carolwood Barn, the museum was dedicated on July 18, 1999 by Diane and members of the extended Disney family, as well as local politicians such as president of the LA Parks & Recreation Commission Steve Soboroff and special assistant to Mayor Richard Riordan (and future LA city councilman) Tom LaBonge.

The museum originally opened with only the barn and a few exhibits inside. Over time the displays have changed as the Carolwood Foundation has acquired more artifacts. In May 2008, a miniature railroad depot that was originally part of Disney animator Ollie Johnston's backyard layout, was moved to the barn and restored for display.

The barn received its largest expansion in 2010, when the Carolwood Foundation acquired the original Disneyland Railroad combine car from the family of railroad collector Bill Norred. The car was part of the Retlaw I passenger train that was utilized on the Disneyland Railroad by Engine No. 2 E.P. Ripley from 1955 to 1966. After a meticulous restoration, the combine car was placed in a pavilion next to the barn for display and preservation. The pavilion was built in such a way so that the combine car can be removed for temporary display elsewhere, such as at the Fullerton Railroad Days event and the D23 Expo. In 2019, an exhibit space opened up inside the combine pavilion. Funds are still being raised for a more permanent pavilion.

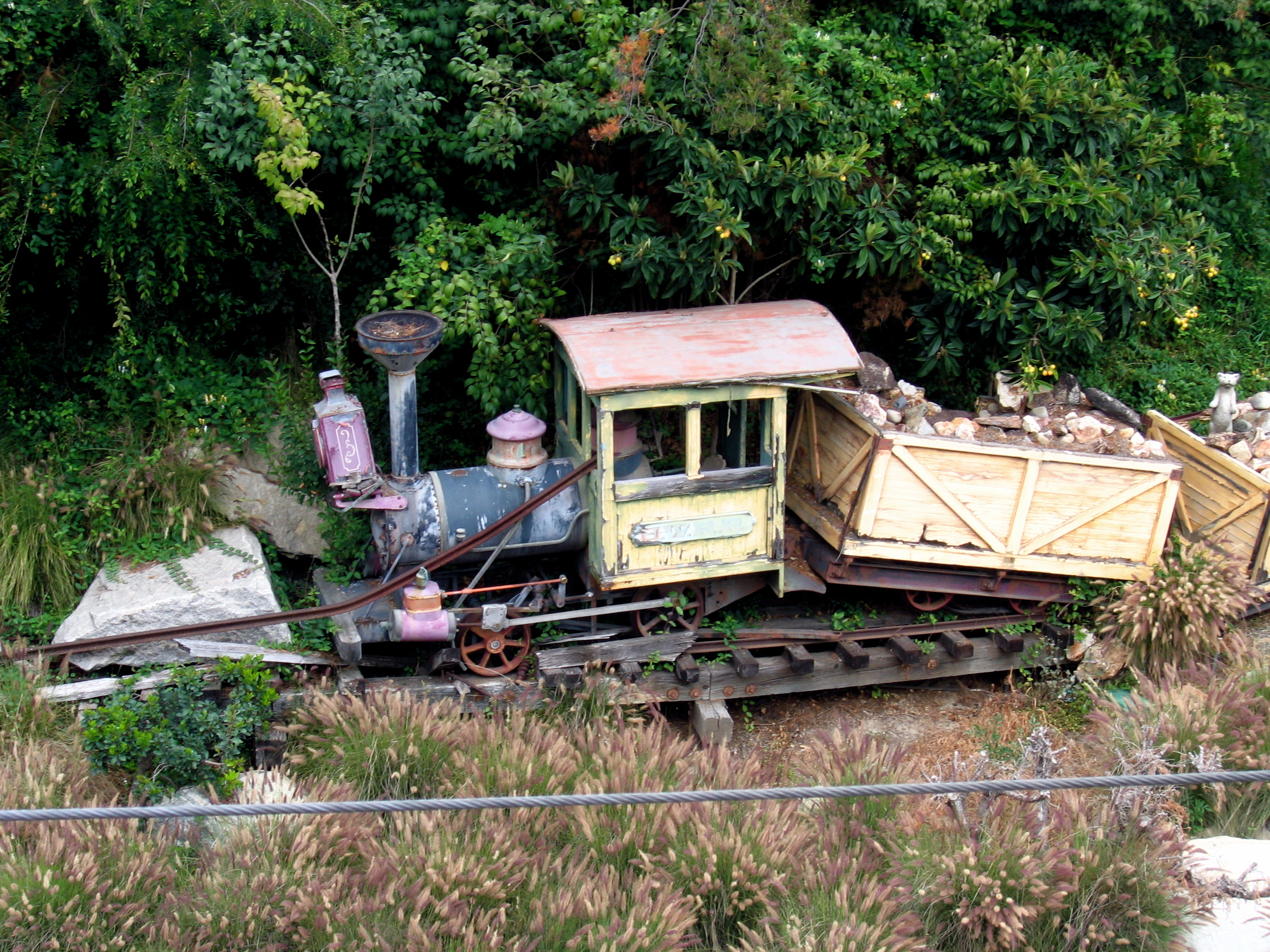
The wrecked Mine Train Through Nature's Wonderland locomotive and cars along the Rivers of America at Disneyland.

In 2016, the Carolwood Foundation announced a partnership with the Walt Disney Archives to restore and display the last surviving locomotive and passenger cars from the Mine Train Through Nature's Wonderland attraction, which operated at Disneyland from 1960 until 1977 (though it had run in the attraction's previous iteration, Rainbow Caverns Mine Train, since 1956). A completion date has yet to be announced.

Walt Disney's Carolwood Barn is operated by volunteers from the Carolwood Foundation, a non-profit organization, on behalf of the barn's owner, The Walt Disney Family Foundation. Its lack of an admission charge has given the barn the informal title of being "the only free Disney attraction in the world."

== Museum layout ==
The barn operates independently of the rest of the Los Angeles Live Steamers complex and has its own entrance located on the eastern end of the property off of Zoo Drive. Visitor parking is free in an unpaved lot adjacent to the entrance. Once inside the gate, signs direct guests to the barn meadow and surrounding displays. Miniature train rides can be found at the LALSRM main entrance at the west end of the property.

The centerpiece of the museum is the barn itself. Inside the barn are displays telling the story of Walt Disney's connection to trains through his life and his work—including photographs and original artifacts like an actual CPRR car. There are also displays dedicated to animators Ward Kimball and Ollie Johnston, who were responsible for rejuvenating Disney's interest in model railroads in the late 1940s.

Beyond the barn are the souvenir stand, steam plant (operated by LALSRM members), Ollie Johnston Depot, and combine car pavilion. The pavilion houses not just the combine car, but also an exhibit about the history of the Disneyland Railroad and other train-related attractions at the Disney theme parks.

== Special guests ==
The barn hosts several special events and book signings throughout the year. Special guests have also appeared at the barn for events, including Disney Legends. Notable guests have included Bobby Burgess, Margaret Kerry, Floyd Norman, Tony Baxter, Rolly Crump, Harriet Burns, and Alice Davis.
