= Rail transport in Walt Disney Parks and Resorts =

List of rail transport installations

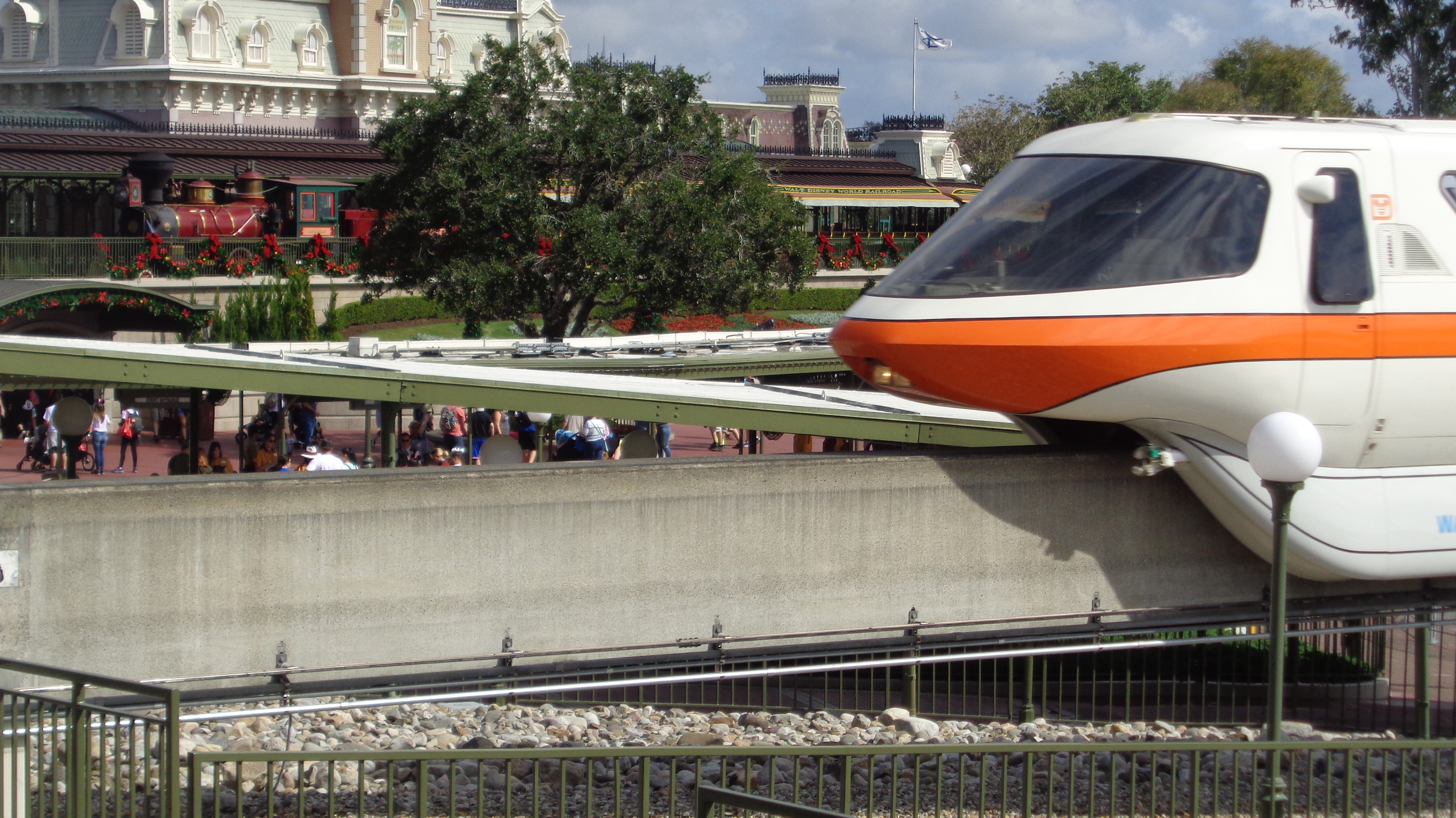
Trains of the Walt Disney World Monorail System (foreground) and Walt Disney World Railroad (background) at the entrance to Magic Kingdom

Yes, in one way or another I have always loved trains.

— Walt Disney

Rail transport can be found in every theme park resort property owned or licensed by Disney Experiences, one of the three business segments of the Walt Disney Company. The origins of Disney theme park rail transport can be traced back to Walt Disney himself and his personal fondness for railroads, who insisted that they be included in the first Disney park, the original Disneyland (a key component of the Disneyland Resort) in California in the United States, which opened on July 17, 1955. The Disney tradition of including transport by rail in, and adjacent to, its parks has since been extended to other Disney properties with the opening of Walt Disney World in Florida in the United States, Tokyo Disney Resort in Japan, Disneyland Paris in France, Hong Kong Disneyland Resort in China, and Shanghai Disney Resort in China. The Disney theme park chain is the largest on the planet by annual attendance with over 155 million visitors in 2019, and the rail systems located inside its properties play key roles as modes of transportation and as attractions for its visitors.

Each Disney theme park resort has a rail transport system serving its general resort area, whether it is a monorail system located inside the Disney resort properties in the United States and Japan, or a conventional rail system connecting external rail networks to the Disney resorts in France and China. The Disneyland Monorail System in California was the first monorail system in the United States; the Walt Disney World Monorail System in Florida, with an estimated 150,000 passengers per day, is one of the busiest monorail systems in the world. Both Disney park resort properties in the United States, as well as those in Japan and France, contain theme parks that feature genuine steam-powered railroads. The Disney park chain has one of the world's largest private collections of operational steam locomotives, with seventeen in total spread across the globe. Additional rail systems within the theme parks in both United States resorts and the Hong Kong resort resemble steam-powered railroads, but their locomotives are powered by internal combustion engines. Other rail transport modes found in Disney parks include horse-drawn streetcar rail lines within both resorts in the United States and the resort in France, replica vintage electric rail lines in California and Japan, and a people mover in Florida.

== Disneyland Resort ==
Name	Location	Image	Motive power type	Track gauge	Opened	Closed	Notes
Disneyland Monorail	General resort area	Disneyland Monorail	Electric (busbar)	Monorail	June 14, 1959	–	First operational monorail system in the United States. Historic Mechanical Engineering Landmark status. Valid admission to Disneyland is required to ride this monorail.
Disneyland Railroad	Disneyland	Disneyland Railroad	Steam	3 ft (914 mm)	July 17, 1955	–	Design inspired by Walt Disney's Carolwood Pacific Railroad and Ward Kimball's Grizzly Flats Railroad.
Main Street Vehicles	Disneyland	Main Street Vehicles	Working animal	3 ft (914 mm)	July 17, 1955	–	Besides the tramway with horse-drawn streetcars, non-rail, old-fashioned motor vehicles are also part of this attraction.
Casey Jr. Circus Train	Disneyland	Casey Jr. Circus Train	Internal combustion (gasoline)	2 ft (610 mm)	July 17, 1955	–	Based on the anthropomorphic locomotive character Casey Junior from the Disney 1941 animated feature film Dumbo
Mine Train Through Nature's Wonderland (formerly Rainbow Caverns Mine Train)	Disneyland	Mine Train Through Nature's Wonderland	Electric (battery)	2 ft 6 in (762 mm)	July 2, 1956	January 2, 1977	Replaced by the Big Thunder Mountain Railroad mine train roller coaster attraction
Viewliner Train of Tomorrow	Disneyland	–	Internal combustion (gasoline)	2 ft 6 in (762 mm)	June 10, 1957	September 30, 1958	Replaced by the Disneyland Monorail System
PeopleMover	Disneyland	PeopleMover	Electric (track-embedded spinning tires)	People mover	July 2, 1967	August 21, 1995	The former line's elevated track infrastructure is still present at the park.
Jolly Trolley	Disneyland	Jolly Trolley	Internal combustion (diesel)	3 ft (914 mm)	January 24, 1993	December 2003	The former line and ride vehicles are still present at the park as static displays.
Red Car Trolley	Disney California Adventure	Red Car Trolley	Electric (battery)	1,000 mm (3 ft 3 3/8 in) metre gauge	June 15, 2012	February 9, 2025	Non-operating overhead wires are in place to recreate the appearance of a heritage streetcar line.

== Walt Disney World ==
Name	Location	Image	Motive power type	Track gauge	Opened	Closed	Notes
Walt Disney World Monorail System	Magic Kingdom and Epcot resort areas	Walt Disney World Monorail System	Electric (busbar)	Monorail	October 1, 1971	–	One of the world's busiest monorail systems with an estimated 150,000 passengers each day. No purchase of any kind is required to ride this monorail.
Walt Disney World Railroad	Magic Kingdom	Walt Disney World Railroad	Steam	3 ft (914 mm)	October 1, 1971	–	All four locomotives, originally built by Baldwin Locomotive Works, were purchased from the Ferrocarriles Unidos de Yucatán.
Main Street Vehicles	Magic Kingdom	Main Street Vehicles	Working animal	3 ft (914 mm)	October 1, 1971	–	Besides the tramway with horse-drawn streetcars, non-rail, old-fashioned motor vehicles are also part of this attraction.
PeopleMover	Magic Kingdom	PeopleMover	Electric (track-embedded linear induction motors)	People mover	July 1, 1975	–	An early concept model for Epcot can be seen during the ride. Used purely as an attraction and not for transportation purposes, as it only has one station.
Fort Wilderness Railroad	Disney's Fort Wilderness Resort & Campground	–	Steam	2 ft 6 in (762 mm)	January 1, 1974	February 1980	Numerous operational problems, poor design, and high costs led to the closure of this railroad.
Wildlife Express Train	Disney's Animal Kingdom	Wildlife Express Train	Internal combustion (diesel)	3 ft (914 mm)	April 22, 1998	–	Despite the dated and weathered appearance of the trains, they are actually brand-new models built by Severn Lamb.

== Tokyo Disney Resort ==
Name	Location	Image	Motive power type	Track gauge	Opened	Closed	Notes
Disney Resort Line	General resort area	Disney Resort Line	Electric (busbar)	Monorail	July 27, 2001	–	Fares are required to ride this monorail. A transfer to Maihama Station, served by the JR East rail network's Keiyō Line and Musashino Line, exists via a short walk from the monorail's Resort Gateway Station.
Western River Railroad	Tokyo Disneyland	Western River Railroad	Steam	2 ft 6 in (762 mm)	April 15, 1983	–	Used purely as an attraction and not for transportation purposes, as it only has one station
Jolly Trolley	Tokyo Disneyland	Jolly Trolley	Electric (battery)	3 ft (914 mm)	April 15, 1996	April 14, 2009	The former line and ride vehicles are still present at the park as static displays.
DisneySea Electric Railway	Tokyo DisneySea	DisneySea Electric Railway	Electric (third rail)	2 ft 6 in (762 mm)	September 4, 2001	–	Designed to recreate the appearance of a classic elevated railway line

== Disneyland Paris ==
Name	Location	Image	Motive power type	Track gauge	Opened	Closed	Notes
Marne-la-Vallée–Chessy station	General resort area	Marne-la-Vallée–Chessy station	Electric (overhead wire)	4 ft 8 1/2 in (1,435 mm) standard gauge	April 1, 1992 (RER); May 29, 1994 (TGV)	–	Served by commuter trains on the Réseau Express Régional (RER) rail network's RER A line, as well as TGV inOui, Ouigo, and Eurostar high-speed trains
Disneyland Railroad	Disneyland Park	Disneyland Railroad	Steam	3 ft (914 mm)	April 12, 1992	–	Originally named Euro Disneyland Railroad, and its old initials, EDRR, are still visible in parts of the park
Horse-Drawn Streetcars	Disneyland Park	Horse-Drawn Streetcars	Working animal	3 ft (914 mm)	April 12, 1992	–	Unlike its counterpart attractions in other Disney parks, this tramway is a separate attraction from the non-rail, old-fashioned motor vehicles making up the Main Street Vehicles attraction.

== Hong Kong Disneyland Resort ==
Name	Location	Image	Motive power type	Track gauge	Opened	Closed	Notes
Disneyland Resort line	General resort area	Disneyland Resort line	Electric (overhead wire)	1,432 mm (4 ft 8 3/8 in)	August 1, 2005	–	Run by the MTR rapid transit rail network along with the line's two stations: Sunny Bay station and Disneyland Resort station. The former station is shared with MTR's Tung Chung line.
Hong Kong Disneyland Railroad	Hong Kong Disneyland	Hong Kong Disneyland Railroad	Internal combustion (diesel)	3 ft (914 mm)	September 12, 2005	–	Unlike its counterpart attractions in other Disney parks where the trains are powered by steam, this railroad's locomotives are steam outline models, which are diesel locomotives with the outward appearance of steam locomotives.

== Shanghai Disney Resort ==
Name	Location	Image	Motive power type	Track gauge	Opened	Closed	Notes
Disney Resort station	General resort area	Disney Resort station	Electric (overhead wire)	4 ft 8 1/2 in (1,435 mm) standard gauge	April 26, 2016	–	Served by Line 11 of the Shanghai Metro rapid transit rail network

== See also ==
- Large amusement railways
- Narrow-gauge railway

Similar railroads:

- Weiser Railroad (opened 1929) in Greenfield Village
- Edaville Railroad (opened 1947) in Edaville Family Theme Park
- Ghost Town & Calico Railroad (opened 1952) in Knott's Berry Farm
- Tweetsie Railroad (opened 1957)
- White Mountain Central Railroad (opened 1958) in Clark's Bears
- Dollywood Express (opened 1961) in Dollywood
- Six Flags & Texas Railroad (opened 1961) in Six Flags Over Texas
- Frisco Silver Dollar Line (opened 1962) in Silver Dollar City
- Cedar Point & Lake Erie Railroad (opened 1963) in Cedar Point
- Efteling Steam Train Company (opened 1969) in Efteling

Museums and private railroads with rolling stock previously run on Disney property:

- Justi Creek Railway
- Los Angeles Live Steamers Railroad Museum
- Pacific Coast Railroad
- Santa Rosa Valley Railroad
- Southern California Railway Museum

== Bibliography ==
- Amendola, Dana (2015). All Aboard: The Wonderful World of Disney Trains (1st ed.). Disney Editions. ISBN 978-1-4231-1714-8.
- Broggie, Michael (2014). Walt Disney's Railroad Story: The Small-Scale Fascination That Led to a Full-Scale Kingdom (4th ed.). The Donning Company Publishers. ISBN 978-1-57864-914-3.
- DeGaetano, Steve (2015). The Disneyland Railroad: A Complete History in Words and Pictures (2nd ed.). Theme Park Press. ISBN 978-1-941500-56-9.
- Leaphart, David (2014). Walt Disney World Railroads Part 1: Fort Wilderness Railroad (1st ed.). Steel Wheel on Steel Rail Studio. ISBN 978-1-5008-0522-7.
