= Pacific Coast Railroad (tourist) =

Narrow-gauge railway in Santa Margarita, California, US

Coordinates: 35.399353°N 120.612930°W

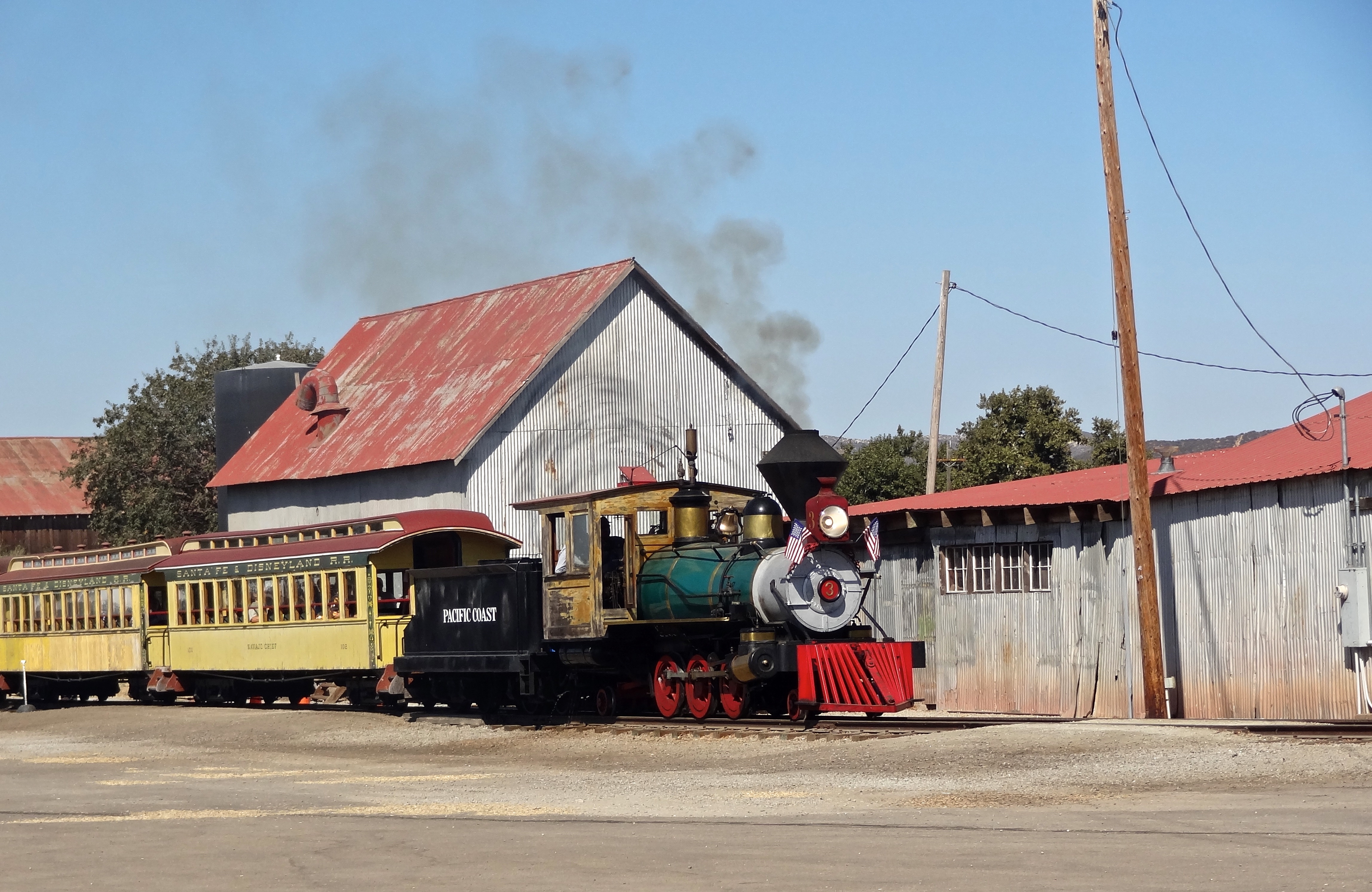

Overview
- Headquarters: Santa Margarita Ranch
- Locale: Santa Margarita, California, U.S.
- Dates of operation: 2000–present

Technical
- Track gauge: 3 ft (914 mm)
- Length: 3.2 miles (5.1 km)

The Pacific Coast Railroad is a 3 ft (914 mm) narrow gauge tourist railroad located at the Santa Margarita Ranch in Santa Margarita, California.

Established in 2000 and completed in 2004 by San Luis Obispo entrepreneur Rob Rossi, the railroad sees only limited public operation. Phase 1 consisted of a 1.5 mi (2.4 km) loop around the most historic part of the ranch. The railroad currently operates three steam locomotives built between 1897 and 1968, and four of the original Santa Fe & Disneyland Railroad Retlaw 1 passenger cars. One of the locomotives, the No. 2 Roger Linn, was used in the Dr. Quinn, Medicine Woman TV show. Other equipment includes an ex-International Railways of Central America caboose, business car Cuscatlan, a ford model A railspeeder, and several ex-Denver & Rio Grande freight cars.

== Equipment ==
Rolling stock of the Pacific Coast Railroad
No.	Name	Mfr.	Classification	Year	Status	Notes
1	Caroline	Guiberson-Harpur	4-4-0	1968	Under Restoration	Originally built for AstroWorld in Houston
2	Roger Linn	Vulcan	2-4-0	1922	Operational	Originally built as a quarry engine, served in Lehigh, Illinois until 1960
3	Melodia	H.K. Porter	2-6-2	1897 (1964)	Operational	Originally built as 0-6-2T for Barker & LePine Sugar Cane Co. of LaFourche Crossing, Louisiana; retired 1953 and rebuilt by Crown Metal Products as 2-6-2 in 1964.
7		GE	Diesel-electric switcher		Operational	In service since at least 2022; repainted in 2023,
1		Smitty	Motor car	1930		Built from a Ford Model A and Fairmont A-3 parts.
RB-1			Railbus			Ex-Durango and Silverton.
102–105	"Retlaw One"	Walt Disney Studios	—	1955	3 Operational 1 Under restoration	Four passenger coaches; retired in the mid-1960s
3410					Operational	Used during Christmas season.
DRGW 6629			Flatcar		Operational	Converted into a rider car as of 2022.
	Photo of the caboose with unit 7		Caboose		Operational	

== See also ==
- List of heritage railroads in the United States
- Los Angeles Live Steamers Railroad Museum
- Rail transport in Walt Disney Parks and Resorts
