= Mine Train Through Nature's Wonderland =

Former attraction at Disneyland

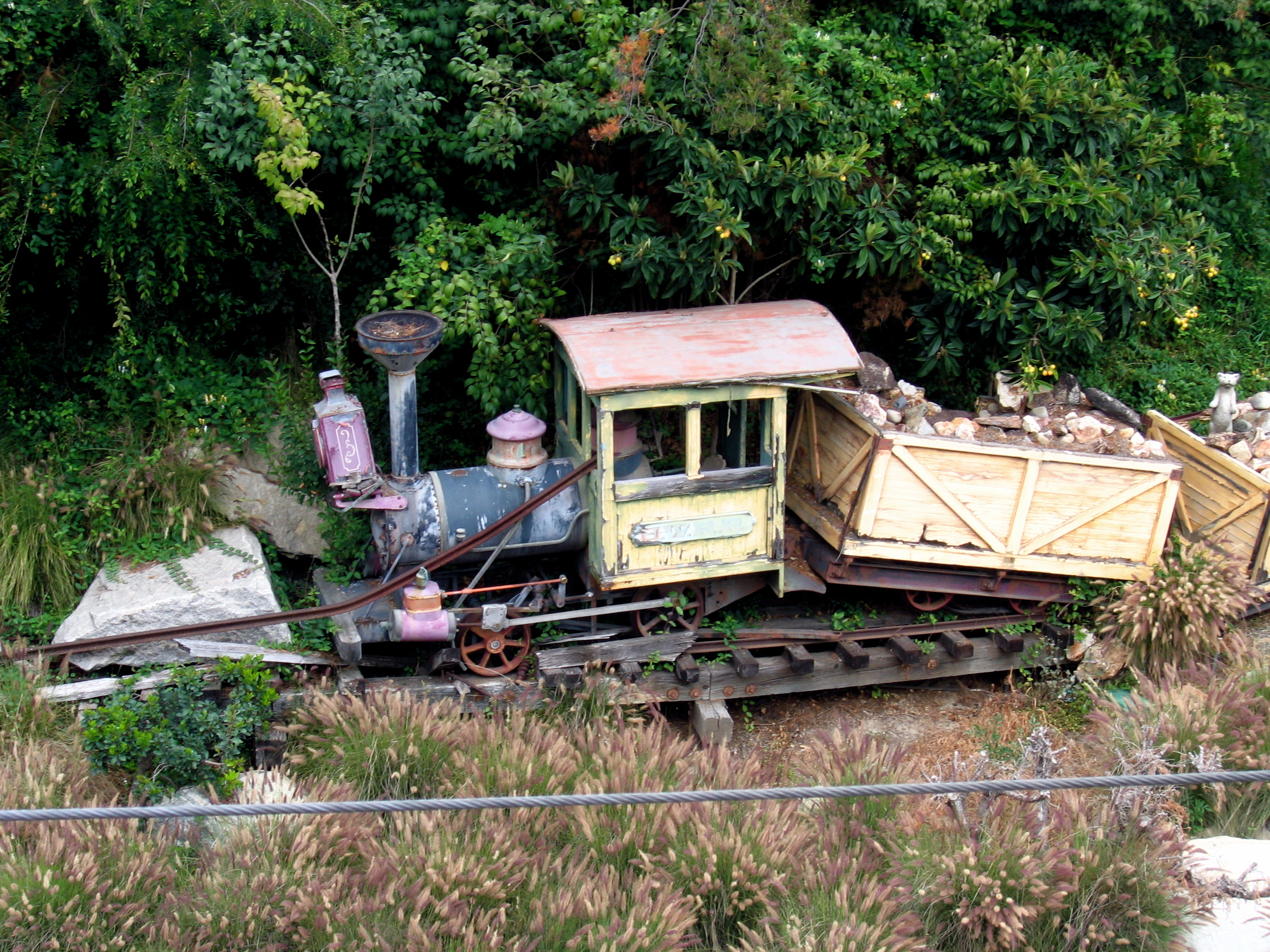
- A locomotive and two train cars from the attraction on display in Disneyland in 2006

Disneyland
- Area: Frontierland
- Status: Removed
- Opening date: July 2, 1956
- Closing date: January 2, 1977
- Replaced by: Big Thunder Mountain Railroad

Ride statistics
- Attraction type: Train
- Designer: WED Enterprises

The Mine Train Through Nature's Wonderland was a 2 ft 6 in (762 mm) narrow gauge railroad attraction in Frontierland in Disneyland, that featured Audio-Animatronic animals in natural desert- and woods-themed environments. It opened on June 12, 1960, as an extension of Rainbow Caverns Mine Train, which opened on July 2, 1956. It closed on January 2, 1977, to make room for Big Thunder Mountain Railroad.

== History ==
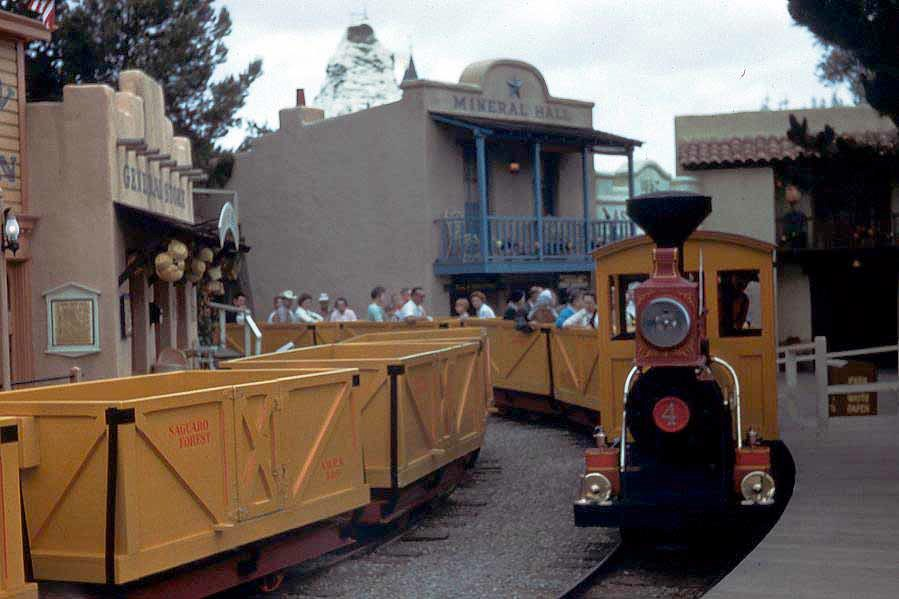
An older photo of the Mine Train when it was in service

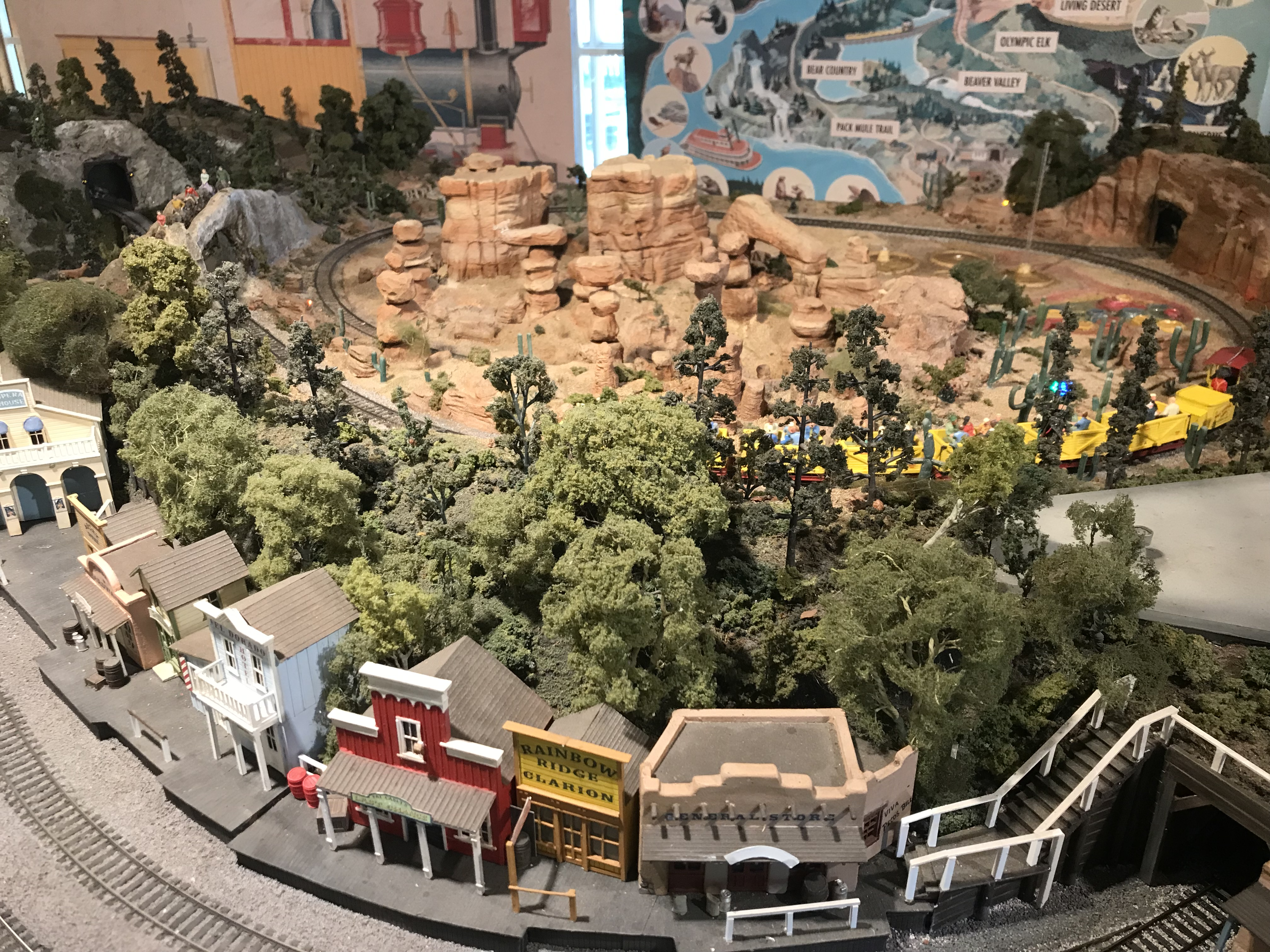
The Mine Train Thru Nature's Wonderland is a miniature on view at Disney's Carolwood Barn.

In 1956, the Rainbow Caverns Mine Train was opened in Frontierland, as part of the Living Desert. Guests boarded a miniature train and were transported through the various scenery of the desert environment, which featured anthropomorphic cacti, the Balancing Rocks which precariously rolled back and forth above the guests, and the beautiful Rainbow Caverns. The Living Desert was also host to other attractions like the Conestoga Wagons, Stagecoaches, and Pack Mules, though the former two disappeared when Nature's Wonderland was introduced.

Mine Train Through Nature's Wonderland was redesigned by Marc Davis when Walt Disney requested him to insert more humor into Disneyland's attractions. Rainbow Caverns Mine Train was closed and redesigned into Nature's Wonderland, taking inspiration from True-Life Adventures. The scenes of the Living Desert and Rainbow Caverns were incorporated into the redesign, which had guests boarding a train at the fictional Western town Rainbow Ridge before heading off into the attraction. The train traveled through Cascade Peak, Bear Country, Beaver Valley, the Living Desert, Devil's Paint Pots (multicolored geysers), and Rainbow Caverns before returning to the station. The attraction featured over two-hundred replicas of North American animals, and the narrative was provided by Dallas McKennon (who also did voices for some of Walt Disney's feature films and is the voice of Gumby).

Due to the rise in popularity for thrill rides, Nature's Wonderland was closed to build a new attraction, Big Thunder Mountain Railroad, which opened in 1979. However, Big Thunder Mountain is similar to Nature's Wonderland, featuring a runaway train as the ride vehicle, the set of Rainbow Ridge is used as the loading area, and a tribute to Rainbow Caverns exists within the attraction.

A surviving locomotive from the ride was part of the scenery on Rivers of America for years, near the former location of Cascade Peak. It was removed in 2010 and sat abandoned in a lot for years until it was moved to the Los Angeles Live Steamers Railroad Museum in 2014, pending final contracts for donation to the Carolwood Society, but was then returned to Disney when negotiations dragged. The deal was finally signed in 2016, and the group began raising funds to restore the engine. It will be placed on display in a new building next door to the Carolwood barn. In 2023, animatronics designer and builder Garner Holt Productions, Inc. began restoration efforts on the remaining locomotive. The work is planned to finish in early 2027.

An episode of Mickey Mouse titled "Nature's Wonderland" was released in October 2017, with its story made in homage of the defunct attraction.

== See also ==
- List of former Disneyland attractions
- Rail transport in Walt Disney Parks and Resorts

== Bibliography ==
- Broggie, Michael (2014), Walt Disney's Railroad Story: The Small-Scale Fascination That Led to a Full-Scale Kingdom (4th ed.), The Donning Company Publishers, ISBN 978-1-57864-914-3
