= Los Angeles Live Steamers Railroad Museum =

Railroad museum in Los Angeles, California

Coordinates: 34.15501°N 118.30213°W

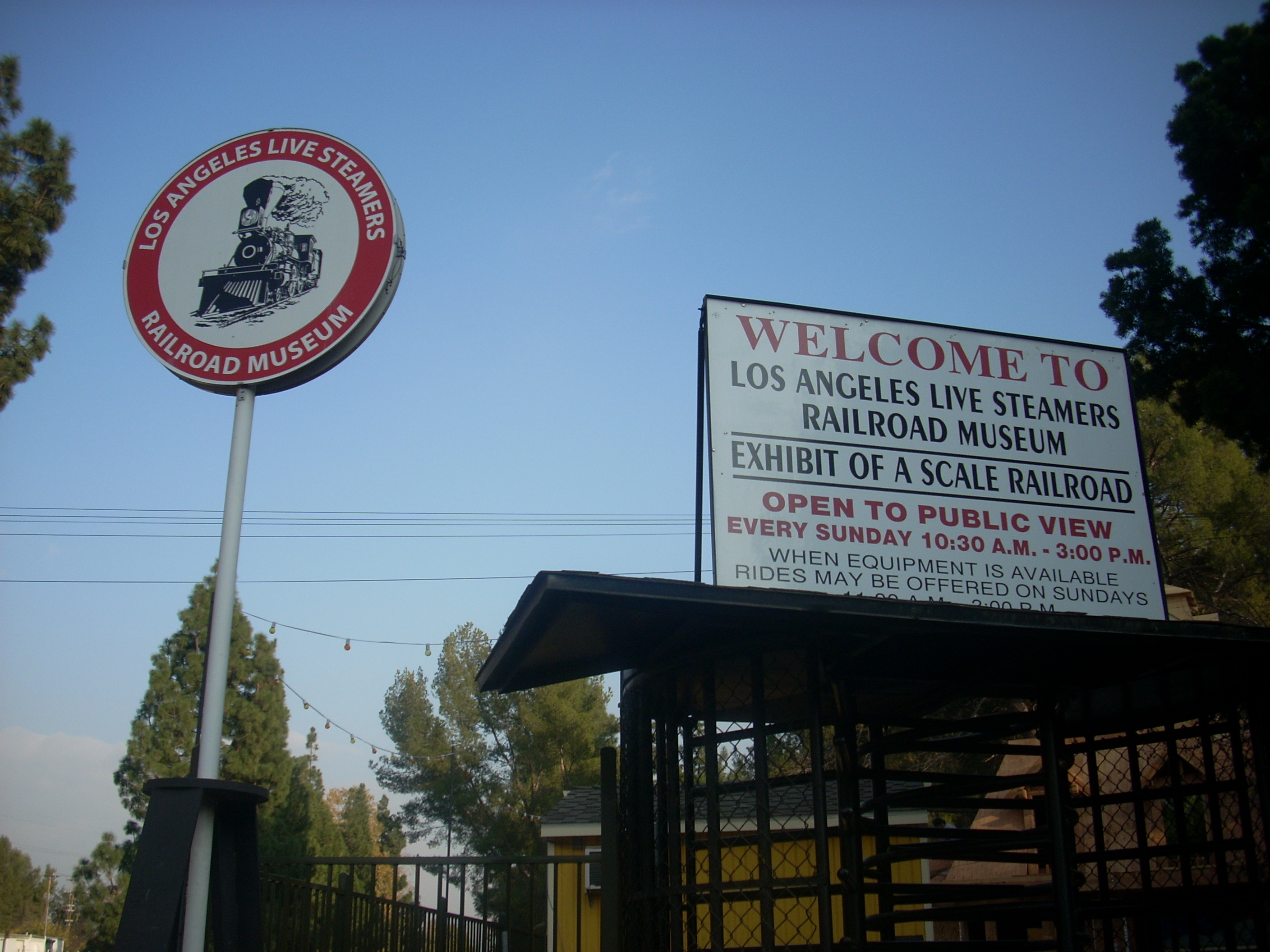
LALSRM Railroad Museum signage in Griffith Park

The Los Angeles Live Steamers Railroad Museum (LALSRM) is a non-profit public-benefit corporation founded in 1956 by live steam enthusiasts for the purpose of educating the public about railroad history and lore, and to promote live steam and scale model railroad technology. The museum is located in Griffith Park in Los Angeles, California and is open from 11 a.m. to 3 p.m. every Sunday weather permitting. In 1956, all of the model locomotives were steam-powered, hence the name "Live Steamers". Over the years, gasoline-powered models of diesel locomotives and battery-electric locomotives and trolleys have also become popular. The museum operates a 7 1/2 in (190.5 mm) gauge miniature railway on which these locomotives pull trains that the public can ride.

The museum also has multiple smaller gauge railroad layouts for members usage in 4.75" gauge, 3.5" gauge, elevated 1 gauge, and g-scale. In addition to live steam layouts, the museum also operates a stationary 19th century steam plant every 3rd Sunday with a variety of vintage restored steam appliances. The museum hosts two live steam gatherings per year for visiting live steam hobbyists, the Spring Meet on Memorial Day Weekend in May and the Fall Meet on the last weekend of October. The museum has also hosted a number themed fundraisers and charity events over the years for Halloween, City of Hope, PADRES Contra el Cancer, and many organizations.

The museum also hosts exhibits related to Walt Disney and his passion for trains, including a full-size barn once located on the miniature Carolwood Pacific Railroad in his backyard. The Carolwood Foundation, a separate non-profit entity from the Los Angeles Live Steamers Railroad Museum, runs the Disney exhibit space and provides volunteers to act as docents.

== In popular culture ==
- This appeared in the 2001 film Beethoven's 3rd
- The railroad appeared in the 2025 Netflix Series The Residence.

== History ==
By 1956, the live steam hobby had gained enough popularity among machinists and craftsmen in the Los Angeles area that a movement was begun to form a new local club. For many months, the group sought out several different locations to no avail. By mid-1956, the group attracted the interest of Charley Atkins, who was at the time the director of the Los Angeles Department of Recreation and Parks and was looking for an accompanying attraction for the neighboring Travel Town Museum which he had helped establish several years prior. By October 1956, both parties had agreed on a location situated on a former floodplain, and the area was leveled with decomposed granite.

Starting in 1957, the group installed elevated turntable steaming bays for 7.5" gauge and the smaller 4.75" and 3.5" gauges, then laid two concentric ovals of track. Prior to the construction of Zoo Drive and the Ventura Freeway in the 1960s, Crystal Springs Drive was the primary road through the area in what now forms the museum's member access driveway. In addition, the perimeter of the museum was encircled by the 3 ft (914 mm) narrow gauge Crystal Springs & Cahuenga Valley Railroad operated by Travel Town Museum utilizing former Oahu Railway and Land Company equipment. There was no perimeter fencing in the first decade of operation, so the public was free to wander the grounds and ask generous engineers for rides. By 1960, the attraction had become so popular that a formal station had to be established for riders to queue in and a perimeter fence added. Old Sherwood Station, named after charter member and longtime museum art director Gordon Sherwood, became a loading area for all three gauges until 1965 when Sutchville Station was established for public loading on the 7.5" gauge only. Sutchville Station was named after charter member Buss Sutch who was also instrumental in the early years of the museum.

By 1965, the railroad had many sidings and longer eastern loops for both the 7.5" and 4.75" gauges with some short bridges. It was also around this same time that famed charter member Walt Disney shortly before passing donated the tracks from his former Carolwood Pacific Railroad to the museum to form the Disney Loop extension. In 1968, a huge mudslide blocked Crystal Springs Drive and part of the Disney Loop which was cleaned up and would eventually form the grade for the Mountain Division. The railroad would undergo tremendous expansion in the 1980s after the former Crystal Springs Drive right of way would become the High Line route of the West End. Starting in the east end with the construction of a 200-foot trestle and driveway crossing in 1981, the expansion entailed constructing an additional three tunnels and four bridges, culminating with the crane installation of the massive O'Brien-Moore Bridge in 1983. During the 1990s, extensive rail wear from public hauling led the club to switch from aluminum to steel rail. In 1995, a landslide in the West End caused the original Eucalyptus Canyon route to be phased out in favor of the current routing. Also during this time period, public loading operations were moved from Sutchville Station to New Sherwood Station for better crowd control. Shortly thereafter, a new g-scale layout was added adjacent to New Sherwood Station for members usage and to entertain riders exiting the station.

Several improvements to safety were made in the early 2000s with the introduction of straddle-type bench cars instead of gondolas for public riders, as well as right-of-way improvements. In 2002, members constructed and opened the Smith Valley line designed as a lower alternate route to the High Line. From 2006-2007, the tracks comprising Webb Yard and Sutchville Station were updated extensively with more sidings and improved traffic flow. As a result, the 50th Anniversary Spring Meet was rescheduled from 2006 to 2007 along with the Fall Meet. From 2010-2012, a new station building was constructed to house a new ticket booth and ADA-accessible restroom facilities for public riders at New Sherwood Station. During the summer of 2014, the West End of the railroad was shut down temporarily for tunnel work as part of the LADWP Headworks Reservoir pipeline project. In 2016, the museum celebrated its 60th anniversary by hosting a special Spring Meet and commemorating a new 1 gauge elevated live steam layout.

== Signaling ==
Since the 1980s, the track has gained a comprehensive signal system based on Automatic Block Signaling for maintaining safe separation between trains and route indication. The layout has more than 80 electronic signal blocks and 50 motorized turnouts and was extensively used for bidirectional operations from 1995-2005. In addition, the layout utilizes a restored Wigwag (railroad) crossing signal and has a replica 19th century highball signal on display.

== Facilities ==
The museum has more than 1.5 miles of 7.5" gauge track covering an assortment of different routes. Since 2007, public operations have been largely limited to the High Line on the West End and the Mountain Division on the East End. While New Sherwood Station is only used for public boarding, Sutchville Station and Old Sherwood Station are still used for member boarding and private events. There are several large yards, sidings, turntables, transfer tables, and reversing tracks for trains on the layout. In addition, the museum also has extensive loading, maintenance, and storage facilities for members trains.

Over the years, the museum has brought in several historical pieces of full-size rolling stock renovated for use as museum offices and meeting rooms. There are three cabooses originally built for the Atchison, Topeka and Santa Fe Railway, Texas and New Orleans Railroad, and Union Pacific Railroad, as well as two streamlined Union Pacific passenger cars that saw service on the City of Los Angeles (train).

The 4.75" and 3.5" gauges are configured in a ground level shared dual-gauge format. Two loops make up the current layout with three yards, a turntable, roundhouse, transfer table, and elevated steaming area.

== Locomotives ==
In addition to the numerous privately owned consists operated by members, the museum maintains several locomotives for public hauling by qualified members. Currently, the club has 4 operational diesels which use gasoline-hydraulic and battery-electric propulsion, and an oil-fired 3.75" scale 2-4-4T Forney built by RMI Railworks in 2008.

== Walt Disney's Carolwood Barn ==
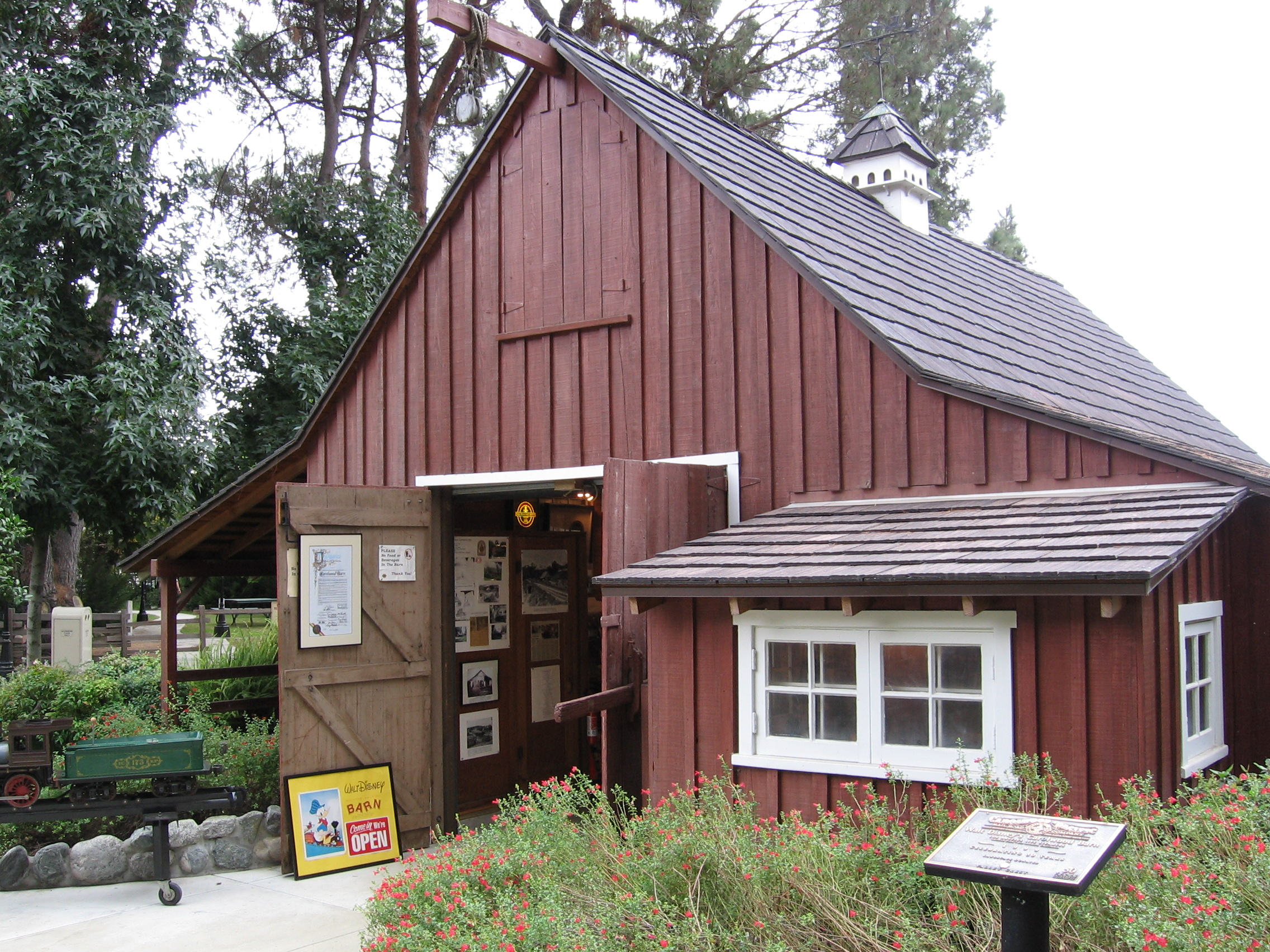
Walt Disney's Carolwood Barn

Walt Disney's Carolwood Barn, a separate museum within the Los Angeles Live Steamers complex, opened in 1999. The barn was the backyard workshop of Walt Disney, co-founder of The Walt Disney Company. Walt was an avid train enthusiast and his status as a charter member of LALSRM made the property a good fit to host the barn. Originally part of the backyard layout at Walt's residence in Holmby Hills, it was moved to LALSRM in 1999.

The barn has an extensive collection of Disney artifacts and memorabilia related to steam trains. When the barn is open to the public, volunteers from the Carolwood Foundation, the separate non-profit that operates the barn, are available to answer questions, provide informal tours, and describe displays about the intimate relationship Walt Disney had with railroading.

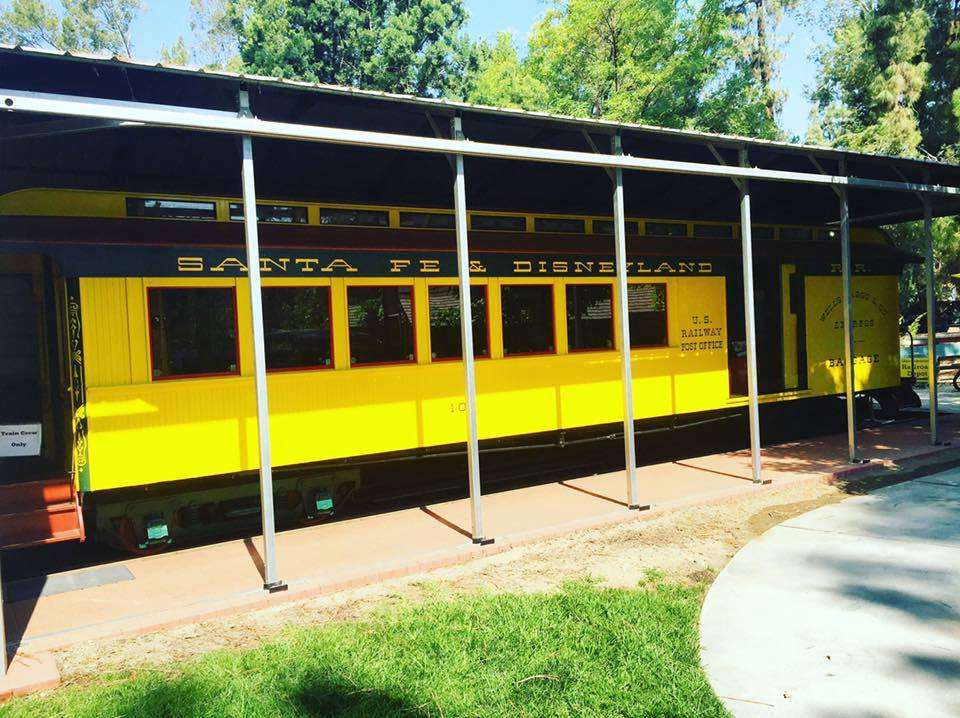
The Disneyland Railroad combine car is on display adjacent to Walt Disney's Carolwood Barn.

In addition to the items on display inside the barn, the combine car from the Disneyland Railroad's original Retlaw I passenger train, and a miniature train station once owned by Disney animator Ollie Johnston, are on display adjacent to the barn. A surviving locomotive and two train cars from the former Mine Train Through Nature's Wonderland attraction at Disneyland will also be displayed next to the barn after they are restored by the Carolwood Foundation.

Complimentary public admission to this museum is available on the third Sunday of each month from 11:00 a.m. to 3:00 p.m., which coincides with demonstrations of the LALSRM stationary steam plant. There is also a separate entrance for the barn at the west end of the LALSRM complex. Its lack of an admission charge has given the barn the informal title of being "the only free Disney attraction in the world".

== See also ==
- Pacific Coast Railroad
- Rail transport in Walt Disney Parks and Resorts
- Travel Town Museum
