= Central Pacific 173 =

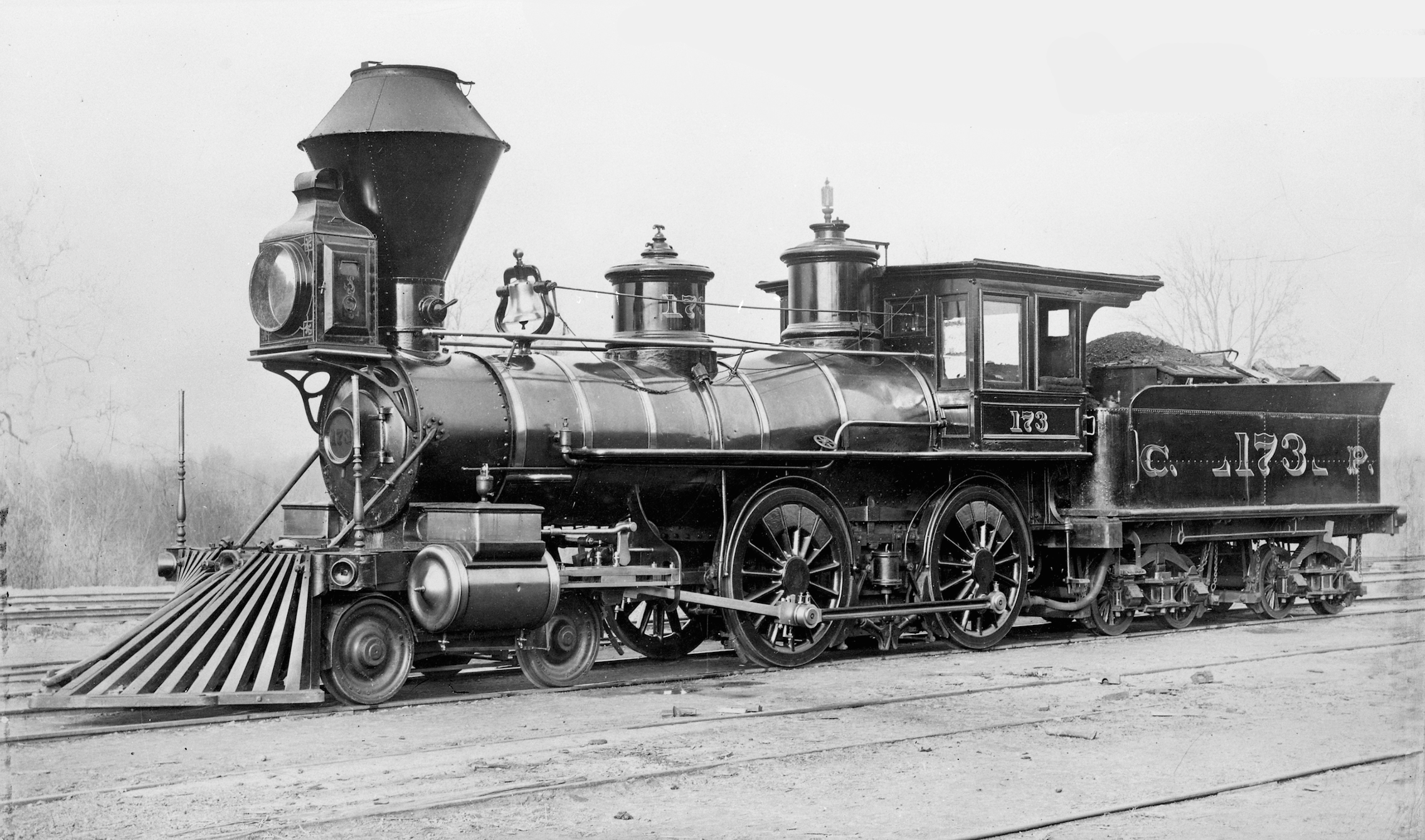
- Central Pacific 173 as the locomotive appeared in 1883, 11 years after being rebuilt
Type and origin
- Power type: Steam
- Designer: Andrew Jackson Stevens
- Builder: Norris-Lancaster
- Serial number: 13
- Build date: 1864
- Total produced: 1 (prototype for first 12 CP-built engines)
- Rebuilder: Central Pacific's Sacramento Shops
- Rebuild date: 1872
Specifications
- Configuration
  - Whyte: 4-4-0
  - UIC: 2'Bn
- Gauge: 4 ft 8 1/2 in (1,435 mm)
- Driver dia.: 54 in (1.372 m)
- Fuel type: Coal
- Cylinders: Two, outside
- Cylinder size: 17 in × 24 in (432 mm × 610 mm)
Career
- Operators: Western Pacific Railroad; Central Pacific Railroad; Southern Pacific Railroad
- Numbers: WP "H"; CP 173~SP 1285; SP 1523
- Official name: Sonoma
- First run: 1863
- Retired: 1909
- Preserved: V&T 18
- Disposition: Original and most copies scrapped in 1909, one copy preserved

Central Pacific 173 was a 4-4-0 "American" type steam locomotive, built by Norris-Lancaster for the Western Pacific Railroad in 1864. After its acquisition by Central Pacific, #173 was involved in a bad wreck, lying idle for two years before undergoing a sweeping reconstruction by the line's Sacramento Shops. It subsequently became the prototype for the railroad's engines when the CP began constructing locomotives. The engine was successful, and more engines were built to #173's design.

In the 1950s, its blueprints became the basis for a miniature railroad built by Hollywood movie studio owner and railroad enthusiast Walt Disney, who had a 1:8 replica built by the studio's machine shop. The Lilly Belle which resulted was widely copied by other "live steam" hobbyists and became the basis for the future Disneyland theme park's miniature railroad's engine, the C. K. Holliday. The engine itself also served as the basis for Engine No. 2 in the Disney animated short films The Brave Engineer, Out of Scale, and A Cowboy Needs a Horse.

== History ==
The locomotive was built in 1864 by Norris-Lancaster for the Western Pacific Railroad, which had it designated H in keeping with its alphabetic scheme and named it the Sonoma. The engine became Central Pacific's #173 after the railroad acquired the Western Pacific in 1869. A train wreck involving #173 and #177 occurred at Alameda Junction on November 14, and both engines were brought to the railroad's extensive shops in Sacramento two years later. Here, master mechanic Andrew Jackson "A.J." Stevens was given the task of rebuilding the #173. Though extensive damage was sustained from the wreck, Stevens found many of the engine's parts to be reusable and had decided to use the #173 as a test bed for the railroad's entry into the locomotive manufacturing business. The rebuild was extensive enough that the Central Pacific listed itself as the builder in subsequent records. The rebuilt #173, finished in November 1872, was well received by the railroad, and soon the shops produced twelve engines based on its design. Three of these were sold to other roads, among which was Virginia and Truckee Railroad's Dayton locomotive, which is the only preserved example of #173's design.

In addition to newly constructed engines, the #173 would also serve as the template for rebuilding the railroad's existing engines, as the Central Pacific began following the practice increasingly widespread among major railroads at the time of standardized components for easier maintenance and a more unified appearance among its engines. As such, the road's engines, including the Jupiter, the Gov. Stanford, as well as those of the Southern Pacific, such as the C. P. Huntington, would receive stacks and other components of #173's design as they were serviced in the shops, as well as having their names removed (as the road had discontinued the practice of naming engines).

As a side note, #177 was even more extensively rebuilt in 1873, apparently with very little (if any) of the original engine reused and was also listed as built by Central Pacific in the records. Through the 1891 to 1901 numbering period, #173 became Southern Pacific #1285, and would later become #1523 in 1907. The locomotive was finally scrapped in 1909, while #177 was sold to an unknown buyer in 1886.

== Subsequent builds ==
Following the success of the design, twelve subsequent locomotives were constructed based on #173's drawings. They either stayed within the CP, or were sold off the other railroads, such as the Virginia and Truckee Railroad and the Los Angeles & San Pedro Railroad.

Locomotive Chart
Appearance	No.	Type	Builder	Construct. #	Build Date	Dimensions Dr.-Cyls.-Weight	1891 No.	Later Nos.
CP #173, pictured in April of 1883.	#173	4-4-0	C.P. Shops, Sacto. (Originally Norris-Lancaster)	Original Pattern, never listed.	1864, Rebuilt 1872.	54-17x24-74000	#1285	#1523
CP #55, pictured as built in 1873.	#55	4-4-0	C.P. Shops, Sacto.	1	6-1873	56-17x24-74000	#1272	#1516
	#99	4-4-0	C.P. Shops, Sacto.	2	7-1873	56-17x24-74000	#1276	#1519
	SP#33 ex-LA&SP* Wilmington	4-4-0	C.P. Shops, Sacto.	3	8/9-1873	56-17x24-74000	#1311	
CP #135, pictured at Elk Grove in the 1880s.	#135	4-4-0	C.P. Shops, Sacto.	4	8-1873	56-17x24-74070	#1281	
V&T #17, pictured in 1905.	V&T #17 Columbus	4-4-0	C.P. Shops, Sacto.	5	9/1873	60-18x24-74000		
V&T #18, pictured in 2022.	V&T #18 Dayton	4-4-0	C.P. Shops, Sacto.	6	9-1873	58-18x24-74000		
CP #188, pictured as built in 1873.	#188	4-4-0	C.P. Shops, Sacto.	7	10-1873	60-18x24-74000	#1368	
CP #187, pictured mid-repaint in the 1880s.	#187	4-4-0	C.P. Shops, Sacto.	8	10-1873	60x18x24-74000	#1367	
	#142	4-4-0	C.P. Shops, Sacto.	9	11-1873	56-17x24-74000	#1282	#1520
CP #179, pictured in service in the early-to-mid-1870s.	#179	4-4-0	C.P. Shops, Sacto.	10	12-1873	56-17x24-74000	#1286	2nd #1368
CP #186 pictured in service on the Oakland local, 1880-1890s.	#186	4-4-0	C.P. Shops, Sacto.	11	1-1874	56-17x24-74000	#1291	#1525
CP #167, pictured in the mid-1870s.	#167	4-4-0	C.P. Shops, Sacto.	12	2-1874	56-17x24-74000	#1283	

*Named Wilmington, number unknown, later became SP #33 after the Southern Pacific merger, #1311 in 1891 and was scrapped in 1900.

== Miniature replicas ==
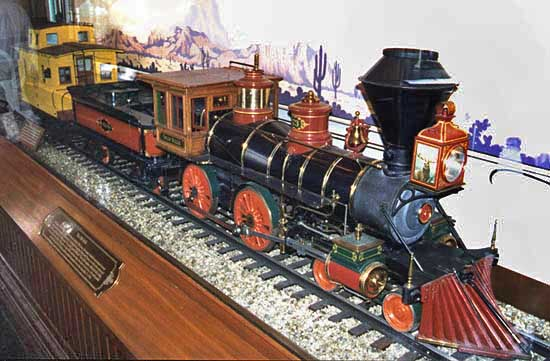
Disney's model of the Carolwood Pacific Railroad #173, named "Lilly Belle" after his wife

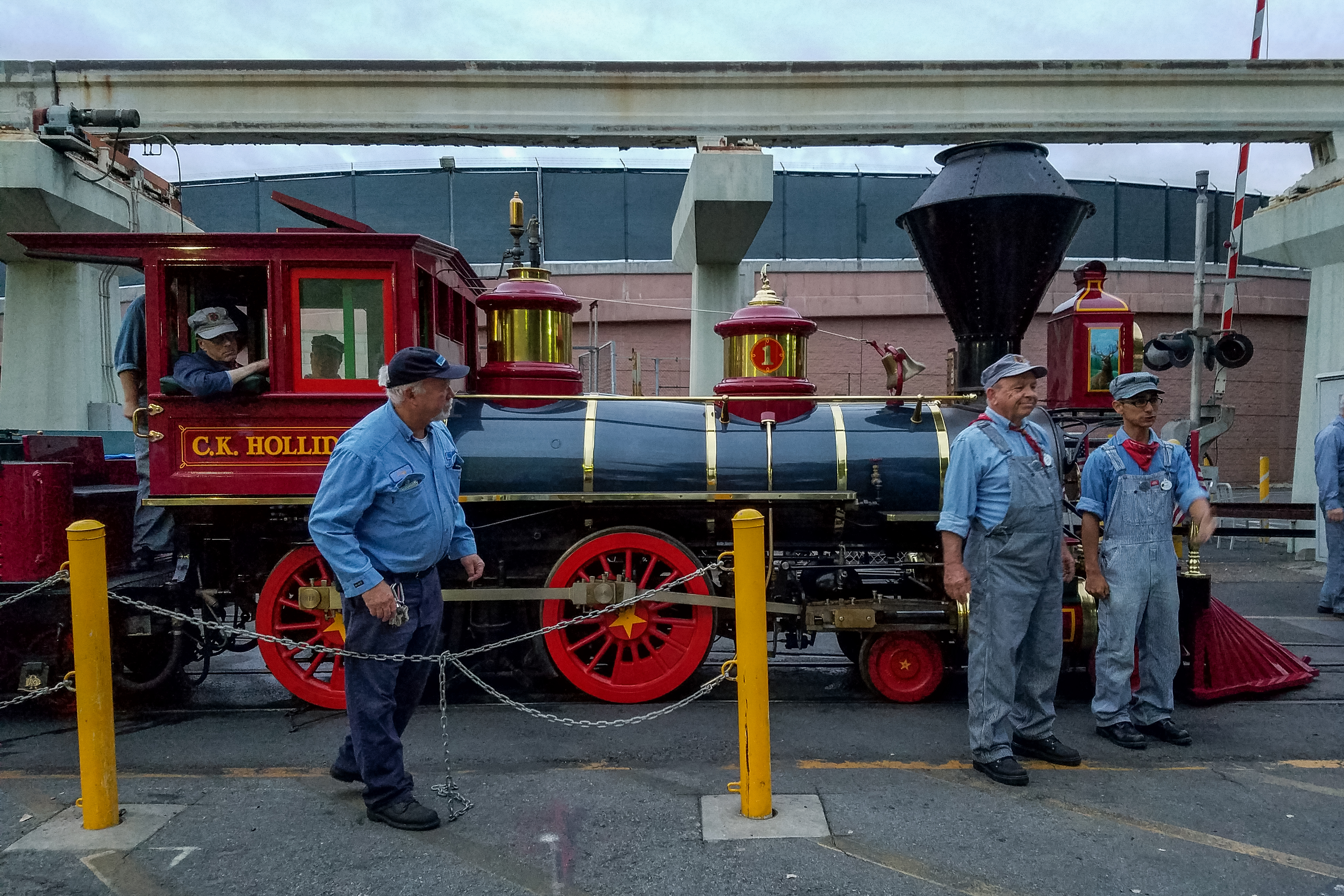
The C.K. Holliday at the Disneyland Railroad shops

In 1939, noted railroad historian Gerald M. Best constructed a 1/2-inch (1:24) scale model of the #173 using scale drawings provided by Southern Pacific draftsman David L. Joslyn, based on specifications recovered by the latter from a warehouse of old SP records. Best's model was built for operation at the Golden Gate International Exposition and was placed on display in his home after the exposition ended.

In 1948, Best's #173 model was shown to Walt Disney, who then decided to construct his own 1:8 scale model of the engine for his proposed rideable miniature railroad, the Carolwood Pacific Railroad. Drawings for Disney's model were likewise provided by Joslyn, with #173's proportions scaled down to 1.5 inches to one foot. Disney's #173, named "Lilly Belle" operated from 1950 to 1953 on his backyard Carolwood Pacific Railroad. After the railroad was shut down, the 173 model was displayed in Disneyland's Main Street station for nearly 50 years, before moving to the new Walt Disney Family Museum, dedicated to Disney's legacy.

At the Disneyland Railroad, the C.K. Holliday locomotive is also modeled after the #173, bearing a strong resemblance to it.

1:8 scale models of the #173 have become very popular with "live steamer" railroad hobbyists. In fact, most build the #173 from castings. The most popular locomotives are made by the Railroad Supply Company.
