= John Shedd Reed =

American industrialist (1917–2008)

- Born: 1917; Chicago
- Died: March 16, 2008 (aged 90); Lake Forest, Illinois
- Education: Los Alamos Ranch School; Hotchkiss School; Yale University; Harvard University
- Military career
- Allegiance: United States
- Branch: Navy
- Conflicts: World War II

John Shedd Reed (1917 in Chicago, Illinois – March 16, 2008 in Lake Forest, Illinois) was an American industrialist and railway magnate. He was president of the Atchison, Topeka and Santa Fe Railway and then of its parent Santa Fe Industries from 1967 until 1986. The rail transport industry journal Modern Railways named Reed its Man of the Year for 1970. Reed was popularly known as "John Santa Fe" by his employees. Prior to his ascendancy as president, Reed oversaw the final transition of the Santa Fe from steam to diesel engines in 1957.

He was educated at Los Alamos Ranch School, The Hotchkiss School, Yale University, and Harvard University. He served as the president of Shedd Aquarium in Chicago, Illinois, from 1984 to 1994. Reed's grandfather was John G. Shedd, founder of the aquarium.

| Preceded by Ernest S. Marsh | President of Atchison, Topeka and Santa Fe Railway; 1967–1986 | Succeeded by W. John Swartz |
| Preceded by John W. Barriger III (Monon, P&LE, MKT) | Modern Railways magazine Man of the Year; 1970 | Succeeded by Jervis Langdon Jr. (PC) |
