= Ernest S. Marsh =

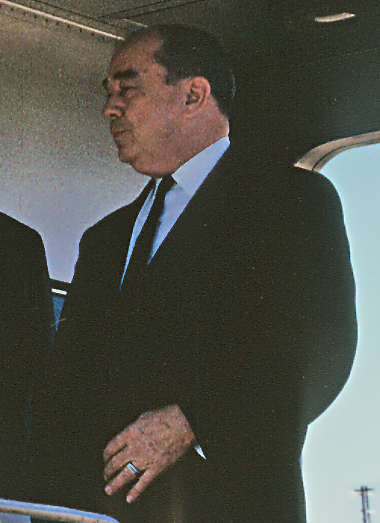
- Marsh aboard the Chief in October 1966
- Born: January 10, 1903; Lynchburg, Virginia, US
- Died: October 9, 1975 (aged 72)
- Occupation: railroad executive

Ernest S. Marsh (January 10, 1903 – October 9, 1975) was president of the Santa Fe Railway system from 1957 through 1966. He was instrumental in forming the railway's holding company, Santa Fe Industries, and served on the board of directors for the Regional Transportation Authority in Illinois.

== Family and education ==
Ernest Marsh was born in Lynchburg, Virginia, on January 10, 1903. In 1912, his father died, which led him to the workforce to help support his family. His formal education did not last through high school, with him taking employment rather than graduating.

== Career ==
Marsh first joined the Santa Fe as a file clerk in 1918 based in Clovis, New Mexico. In a 1973 interview, he revealed that he had lied about his birthdate on his application because the minimum work age at the time was 16; his birthdate in the employee records was not corrected for another 21 years. He served in several clerk positions on the railway until becoming chief clerk at the railway's president's office in Chicago in 1942. He was then promoted in 1944 to be an assistant to the president in 1944 and executive assistant to the president in 1945.

In 1948 Marsh became the Santa Fe's financial vice president. Marsh ascended to the presidency of the Santa Fe on May 1, 1957, succeeding Fred G. Gurley, who had served in that position since 1944. At the same time, John Shedd Reed was named as the president's executive assistant. Marsh was named chief executive officer on May 1, 1958, and chairman of the executive committee on May 1, 1959. Marsh was not averse to spending money to help the railway's success, nor did he spurn new technology, even going so far as to suggest the use of nuclear bombs to help excavate the railway's right-of-way.

On January 1, 1967, Marsh took another promotion, this time to become chairman of the board of directors for the railway. John Shedd Reed then succeeded Marsh as president.

Marsh finally retired from the Santa Fe on January 31, 1973, but remained as a member of the board of directors until his death. Chicago Mayor Richard J. Daley appointed Marsh to a two-year term on the board of directors for the Regional Transportation Authority in June 1974.

Ernest Marsh died at home following a heart attack on October 9, 1975.

== Legacy ==
- Engine No. 4 of the Disneyland Railroad is named Ernest S. Marsh. It began service there on July 25, 1959. It was originally built in 1925 and restored to operating condition for use on the Disneyland Railroad.
- METX 100, an EMD F40PH locomotive owned and operated by Metra is also named the Ernest Marsh. It entered service with Metra in 1977 and was the first F40PH to be delivered into their fleet. It has served Metra's routes out of Chicago Union Station. It currently serves the Union Pacific Northwest Line, Union Pacific North Line, and Union Pacific West Line that leads to Ogilvie Transportation Center. Marsh was on the board of directors with the Regional Transportation Authority which oversees the operations of Metra.
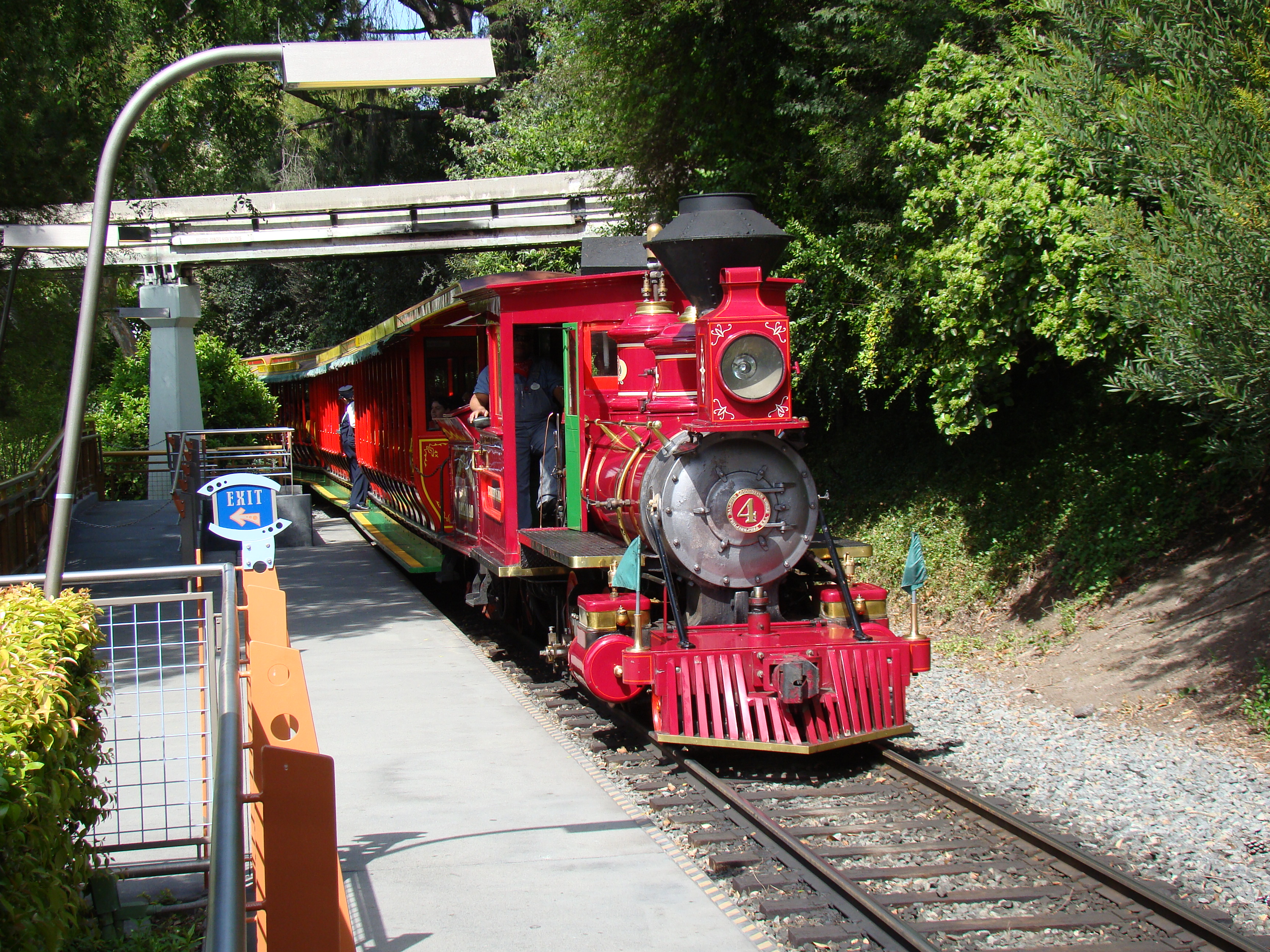
Disneyland Railroad locomotive #4, Ernest S. Marsh in 2016

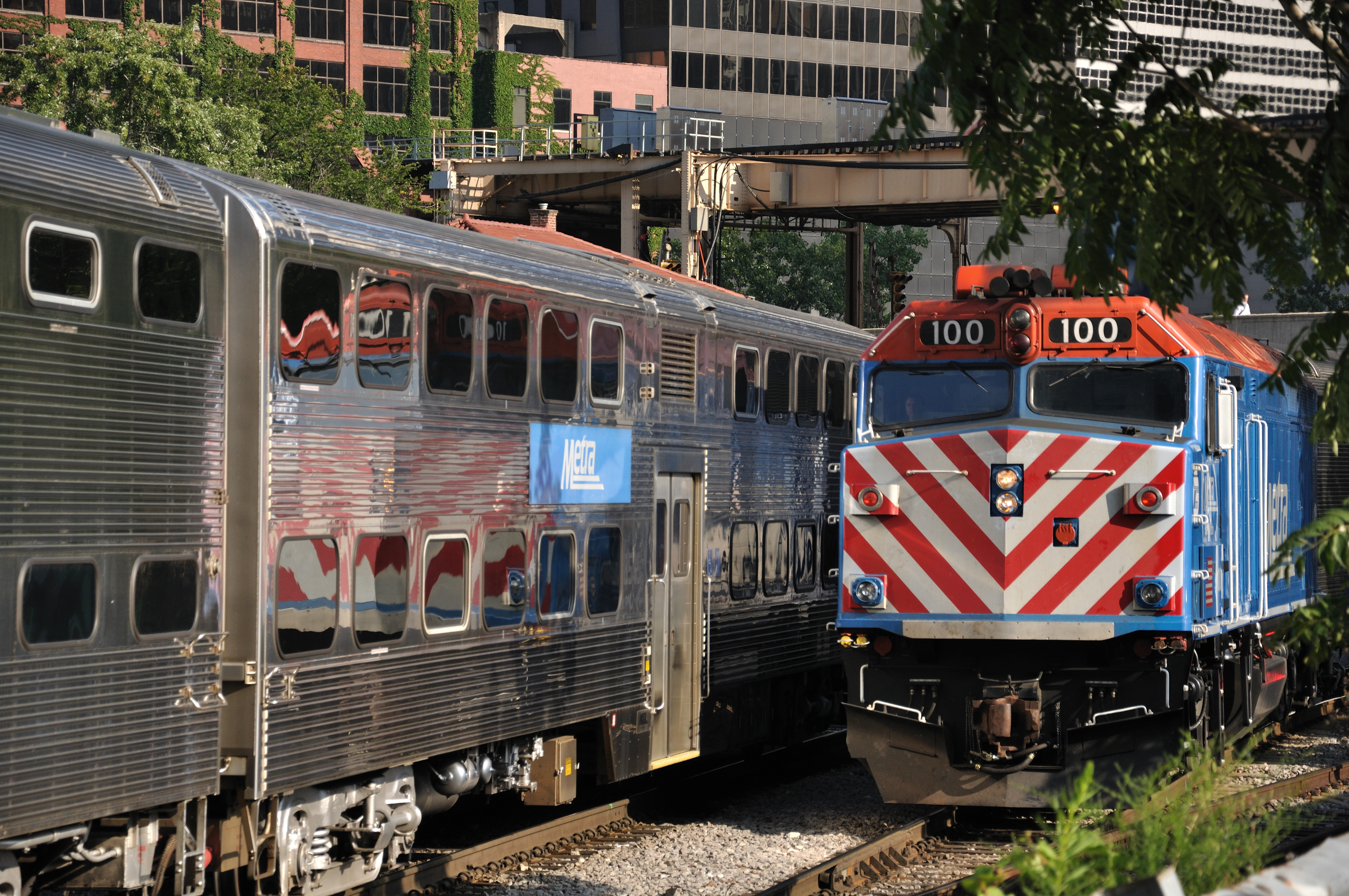
METX 100 leads a commuter train past another train out of Chicago Union Station in 2010

Preceded by Fred Gurley	President of Atchison, Topeka and Santa Fe Railway; 1957 – 1966	Succeeded by John Shedd Reed
