= Fred Gurley =

American railroad executive

Fred G. Gurley
- Born: February 20, 1889; Sedalia, Missouri
- Died: July 4, 1976; Chicago, Illinois
- Occupation: President of Atchison, Topeka and Santa Fe Railway 1944-1957

Fred G. Gurley (February 20, 1889 – July 4, 1976) was president and executive committee chairman of Atchison, Topeka and Santa Fe Railway.

Gurley was born on February 20, 1889 in Sedalia, Missouri, son of Horatio Nelson Gurley (1825-1893) and Mary E. Glass Gurley (1856-1939). He grew up in Kansas City and Warrensburg.

Gurley began his railroad career in 1906 on the Chicago, Burlington and Quincy Railroad, where he worked his way up to become an assistant vice president. In 1939 he transferred to the Santa Fe as a vice president; he was elected president and executive committee chairman of the Santa Fe in 1944, and served until 1957.

He was recognized as an innovator, and guided Santa Fe's transition from steam to diesel power. In 1946, he created Santa Fe Skyways, in an unsuccessful attempt to get the railroad into the air freight business.

On July 17, 1955, Gurley appeared on Dateline: Disneyland; the special broadcast of the opening of Disneyland. Gurley, along with Walt Disney and California Governor Goodwin Knight operated the inaugural running of the Disneyland Railroad; advertised at the time as the Santa Fe & Disneyland Railroad.

Gurley was a Republican, and served as an at-large delegate from Illinois to the 1956 Republican National Convention.

He married Myrtle Margaret Smith in 1913; she died in 1917. He remarried in 1920 to Ruth Brown.

Gurley retired in 1959, but stayed on as a director until 1964. At that time, he was named an honorary director for life by the railroad. He died in Chicago on July 4, 1976.

== Legacy ==
- Engine No. 3 of the Disneyland Railroad is named "Fred Gurley", it began service there on March 28, 1958.

Preceded by Edward Engel	President of Atchison, Topeka and Santa Fe Railway; 1944 – 1957	Succeeded by Ernest S. Marsh
