= Disneyland Railroad =

Steam railroad system in Disneyland

- The attraction poster for the Disneyland Railroad

Disneyland
- Coordinates: 33.8099°N 117.9190°W (Main Street, USA Station); 33.8112°N 117.9219°W (New Orleans Square Station); 33.8148°N 117.9185°W (Mickey's Toontown Depot); 33.8125°N 117.9158°W (Tomorrowland Station)
- Status: Operating
- Opening date: July 17, 1955

Ride statistics
- Attraction type: Heritage railroad
- Manufacturer: Baldwin Locomotive Works
- Designer: WED Enterprises
- Speed: 10–15 mph (16–24 km/h)
- Vehicle type: Train
- Vehicles: 5 steam locomotives; 24 passenger cars
- Duration: 18–20 minutes
- No. of tracks: 1
- Track gauge: 3 ft (914 mm)
- Track length: 1.2 miles (1.9 km)
- Sponsor: Atchison, Topeka and Santa Fe Railway (1955–1974)
- Wheelchair accessible
- Closed captioning available

The Disneyland Railroad (DRR), formerly known as the Santa Fe & Disneyland Railroad, is a 3-foot (914 mm) narrow-gauge heritage railroad and attraction in the Disneyland theme park of the Disneyland Resort in Anaheim, California, United States. Its route is 1.2 miles (1.9 km) long and encircles the majority of the park, with train stations in four different park areas. The rail line, which was constructed by WED Enterprises, operates with two steam locomotives built by WED and three historic steam locomotives originally built by Baldwin Locomotive Works. The ride takes roughly 18 minutes to complete a round trip on its mainline when three trains are running, and 20 minutes when four trains are running. Two to four trains can be in operation at any time, three on average.

The attraction was conceived by Walt Disney, who drew inspiration from the ridable miniature Carolwood Pacific Railroad built in his backyard. The Disneyland Railroad opened to the public at Disneyland's grand opening on July 17, 1955. Since that time, multiple alterations have been made to its route, including the addition of two large dioramas in the late 1950s and mid-1960s. Several changes have been made to its rolling stock, including the conversion of one of its train cars into a parlor car in the mid-1970s, and the switch from diesel oil to biodiesel to fuel its locomotives in the late 2000s.

The railroad has been consistently billed as one of Disneyland's top attractions, requiring a C ticket to ride when A, B, and C tickets were introduced in 1955, a D ticket to ride when those were introduced in 1956, and an E ticket to ride when those were introduced in 1959. The use of E tickets stood until a pay-one-price admission system was introduced in 1982. With an estimated 6.6 million passengers each year, the Disneyland Railroad has become one of the world's most popular steam-powered railroads.

== History ==
=== Attraction concept origins ===
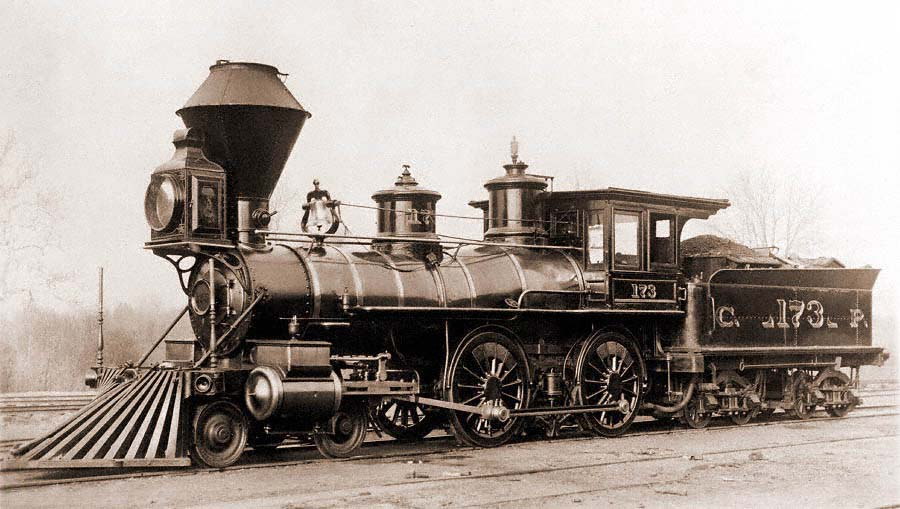
The Central Pacific No. 173 locomotive served as the basis for the 1:8-scale design of Walt Disney's Lilly Belle locomotive and was later used as the basis for the 5:8-scale design of the DRR's first two locomotives.

Walt Disney, the creator of the concepts for Disneyland and its railroad, always had a strong fondness for trains. As a young boy, he wanted to become a train engineer like his father's cousin, Mike Martin, who told him stories about his experiences driving main-line trains on the Atchison, Topeka and Santa Fe Railway. As a teenager, he obtained a news butcher job on the Missouri Pacific Railway, selling various products to train passengers, including newspapers, candy, and cigars. Many years later, after co-founding the Walt Disney Company with his older brother Roy O. Disney, he started playing polo. Fractured vertebrae and other injuries led him to abandon the sport on the advice of his doctor, who recommended a calmer recreational activity. Starting in late 1947, he developed an interest in model trains after purchasing several Lionel train sets.

By 1948, Disney's interest in model trains was evolving into an interest in larger, ridable miniature trains after observing the trains and backyard railroad layouts of several hobbyists, including Disney animator Ollie Johnston. In 1949, after purchasing 5 acres (2.0 ha) of vacant land in the Holmby Hills neighborhood of Los Angeles, he started construction on a new residence for himself and his family, and on the elaborate 7 1/4 in (184 mm) gauge ridable miniature Carolwood Pacific Railroad behind it. The railroad featured a set of freight cars pulled by the Lilly Belle, a 1:8-scale live steam locomotive named after Disney's wife Lillian and built by the Walt Disney Studios' machine shop team led by Roger E. Broggie. The locomotive's design, chosen by Walt Disney after seeing a smaller locomotive model with the same design at the home of rail historian Gerald M. Best, was based directly on copies of the blueprints for the Central Pacific No. 173, a steam locomotive rebuilt by the Central Pacific Railroad in 1872. The Lilly Belle first ran on the Carolwood Pacific Railroad on May 7, 1950. Walt Disney's backyard railroad attracted visitors interested in riding his miniature steam train, and on weekends, when the railroad was operating, he allowed them to do so, even allowing some to become "guest engineers" and drive the train. In early 1953, after a visitor drove the Lilly Belle too fast along a curve, causing it to derail and injure a five-year-old girl, Disney, fearing the possibility of future accidents, closed down the Carolwood Pacific Railroad and placed the locomotive in storage.

Prior to the incident that closed his railroad, Disney consulted with Roger Broggie about the concept of including his ridable miniature train in a potential tour of Walt Disney Studios in Burbank, north of Downtown Los Angeles. Broggie, believing that there would be limited visitor capacity for the attraction, recommended to Disney that he make the train bigger in scale. The idea of a studio tour was eventually replaced by the idea of an amusement park named Disneyland across the street from the studio, and in one of its first design concepts at that proposed location, a miniature steam train ride was included, as well as a larger, narrow-gauge steam railroad attraction. During this time, Disney proposed that the narrow-gauge Crystal Springs & Southwestern Railroad, which the nearby Travel Town Museum in Griffith Park planned to build, be extended to run through Disneyland. Planned construction of the Ventura Freeway across land between the two sites, and rejection by the Burbank City Council of a new amusement park in their city, led Disney to look for a different location to build the park and its narrow-gauge railroad.

=== Planning and construction ===
By 1953, 139 acres (56 ha) of orchard land in Anaheim in Orange County, southeast of Downtown Los Angeles, were chosen as the location for the planned Disneyland park, and on August 8, Walt Disney drew the triangular route for the future Disneyland Railroad (DRR) on the park's site plan. After financing for Disneyland was secured and all of the parcels of land at the Anaheim site were purchased, construction of the park and its railroad began in August 1954. In order to cut costs, a sponsorship deal was arranged with the Atchison, Topeka and Santa Fe Railway (AT&SF), and when it was finalized on March 29, 1955, the DRR was officially named Santa Fe & Disneyland Railroad, paying $50,000 per year. The DRR was known by that name until September 30, 1974, when the AT&SF's sponsorship ended due to the discontinuation of their passenger train business.

Prior to the start of construction of the DRR, in the hope of saving money by buying already-existing trains for the attraction, Disney tried to buy a set of 19 in (483 mm) gauge ridable miniature locomotives from William "Billy" Jones, but after Jones declined his offer, Disney decided that he wanted the railroad's rolling stock to be bigger and made from scratch. For this task, Disney again turned to Roger Broggie, who was confident that he and the Walt Disney Studios' machine shop team could use the design for Disney's 1:8-scale miniature Lilly Belle locomotive and enlarge it to build the DRR's locomotives. The exact size of the rolling stock for the new railroad was determined after Disney saw a set of narrow-gauge Oahu Railway and Land Company passenger cars that had recently arrived at the Travel Town Museum, whose dimensions Disney found to be favorable. The scale of the design for the DRR's passenger cars, based on the 3 ft (914 mm) narrow-gauge passenger cars at the Travel Town Museum, was nominally 5:8-scale when compared to the size of 4 ft 8 1/2 in (1,435 mm) standard gauge rolling stock. The same scale was also chosen for the steam locomotives planned for the DRR, and when its locomotives and passenger cars were completed and paired with its 3 ft (914 mm) narrow-gauge track, the railroad had nearly identical proportions to those of a conventional standard gauge railroad.

Through WED Enterprises, a legally separate entity from Walt Disney Productions, Disney retained personal ownership of the DRR and financed the creation of two trains to run on it in time for Disneyland's opening day. The names of both trains contained the word Retlaw, which is Walter spelled backwards. The first train, referred to by Disneyland employees as Retlaw 1, would be pulled by the No. 2 locomotive, which was given a turn-of-the-20th-century appearance with a straight smokestack (typical of coal-burning locomotives), a circular headlamp, and a small cowcatcher. The No. 2 locomotive would pull six 1890s-style passenger cars designed by Bob Gurr, consisting of a combine car, four coaches, and an observation coach. The second train, referred to by Disneyland employees as Retlaw 2, would be pulled by the No. 1 locomotive, which was given a late-19th-century appearance with a spark-arresting diamond smokestack (typical of wood-burning locomotives), a rectangular headlamp, and a large cowcatcher. The No. 1 locomotive would pull six freight cars consisting of three cattle cars, two gondolas, and a caboose. Walt Disney Studios built the train cars and most of the parts for the locomotives; Dixon Boiler Works built the locomotive boilers, and Wilmington Iron Works built the locomotive frames. Both locomotives were designed to run on diesel oil to generate steam. Final assembly of the locomotives and their tenders took place at the Disneyland site in the DRR's new roundhouse, which was built in one week by a construction crew directed by Park Construction Administrator Joe Fowler, a former US Navy rear admiral. The two original DRR trains cost over $240,000 to build, with the two locomotives costing over $40,000 each.

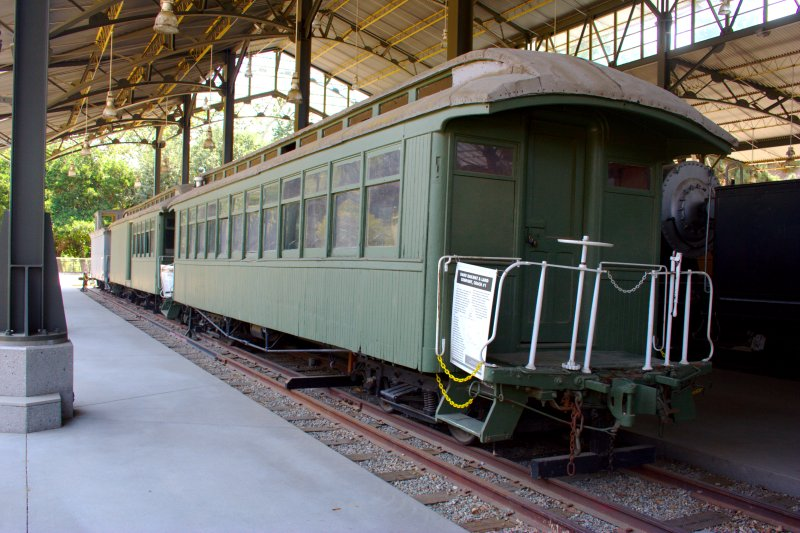
A set of Oahu Railway and Land Company passenger cars were used as the basis for the 5:8-scale design of the DRR's passenger cars.

Before the opening of Disneyland, a station in the Main Street, USA section and a station in the Frontierland section were built for the DRR. Main Street, USA Station, an example of Second Empire-style architecture, was built at the entrance to Disneyland using an original design that incorporated forced perspective elements on its upper levels to make it appear taller. Frontierland Station was built based on the design of the depot building located on the Grizzly Flats Railroad, a full-size 3 ft (914 mm) narrow-gauge railroad owned by Disney animator Ward Kimball in his backyard. Besides the depot building, the DRR's functioning water tower was also built at Frontierland Station.

Railroad-building expert Earl Vilmer created the track layout and operations for the DRR. Roger Broggie hired Vilmer because of his experience building railroads in Iran for the Allies during World War II, in France after the war, and later in Venezuela for U.S. Steel. Vilmer designed the operations of the DRR in such a way that each of its two trains would be assigned to a single station on the rail line, making only complete round trips possible. The Retlaw 1 passenger train pulled by the No. 2 locomotive only serviced Main Street, USA Station while the Retlaw 2 freight train pulled by the No. 1 locomotive only serviced Frontierland Station, and with sidings at both stations, each train would operate simultaneously and continue down the rail line even if the other train was stopped at its station. The first test run of the DRR's trains along the full length of its route occurred on July 10, 1955, one week before Disneyland's opening. The steam trains of the DRR were the first of Disneyland's attractions to become operational.

On July 17, 1955, Disneyland and its railroad opened, and the day began with Disney driving the DRR's No. 2 locomotive and its passenger train into Main Street, USA Station with California governor Goodwin J. Knight and AT&SF president Fred Gurley riding in the locomotive's cab. They were greeted at the station's platform by the park opening ceremony's host Art Linkletter, actor Ronald Reagan, and several television camera crews broadcasting the festivities nationwide. After exiting the locomotive, Linkletter briefly interviewed Disney, Knight, and Gurley before they walked towards the town square in the Main Street, USA section where Disney officially dedicated Disneyland. The DRR eventually became one of the most popular steam-powered railroads in the world with an estimated 6.6 million passengers each year.

=== Additions in the late 1950s ===
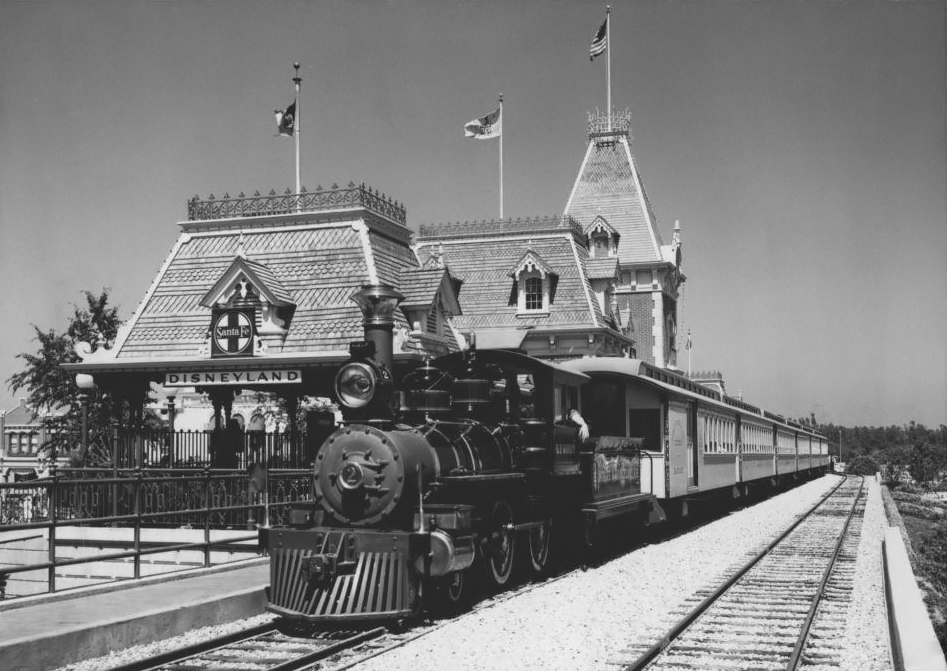
The DRR's No. 2 locomotive (E.P. Ripley) pulling the Retlaw 1 train in July 1955

Shortly after the Disneyland Railroad opened, A, B, and C tickets were introduced in Disneyland for admission to its rides, and C tickets, the highest-ranked tickets, were required to ride the DRR. These tickets were joined by the higher-ranked D ticket in 1956, and D tickets from that point forward were needed to gain access to the DRR.

One of the first additions to the DRR occurred in March 1956 when new covered shelters were built on each end of Frontierland Station's depot building. The shelters were added after the DRR's track on the western edge of its route, and the depot building standing next to it, were moved outwards.

Also during 1956, the Fantasyland Depot, a new station with a Medieval theme and consisting of a covered platform with no station building, was created for the DRR in the Fantasyland section. By the time this new station was added, the DRR's system of having one train assigned to a single station and using sidings to pass trains stopped at stations was abandoned and replaced by the current system where each train stops at every station along the railroad's route. Fantasyland Depot was removed by July 1966 when the It's a Small World attraction, originally built for the 1964 New York World's Fair, was installed.

By 1957, the DRR was becoming overwhelmed by ever-increasing crowds; Disney determined that a third train was needed. Instead of having another locomotive built from scratch to pull the train, Disney believed that costs could be saved by purchasing and restoring an already-existing narrow-gauge steam locomotive, and the job of finding one was given to Roger Broggie. With the assistance of Gerald Best, a suitable locomotive was found in Louisiana; it had been built by Baldwin Locomotive Works in 1894, had previously been used as a switcher at a sugar cane mill in Louisiana owned by the Godchaux Sugar Company, and was initially used by the Lafourche, Raceland & Longport Railway in Louisiana. After its purchase, the locomotive was delivered to the Walt Disney Studios' machine shop where restoration work began, which included installing a new boiler built by Dixon Boiler Works and having its firebox reconfigured to burn diesel oil for fuel to generate steam. This locomotive became the DRR's No. 3 locomotive and it went into service on March 28, 1958, at a cost after restoration of more than $37,000. Joining the No. 3 locomotive when it went into service were five new open-air Narragansett-style excursion cars with front-facing bench seating collectively referred to by Disneyland employees as the Excursion Train, which was designed by Bob Gurr and built at Walt Disney Studios.

On March 31, 1958, the No. 3 locomotive participated in the inauguration ceremony for the DRR's Grand Canyon Diorama, which features a foreground with several lifelike animals, a background painted by artist Delmer J. Yoakum on a single piece of seamless canvas measuring 306 feet (93.3 m) long by 34 feet (10.4 m) high, and musical accompaniment from Ferde Grofé's Grand Canyon Suite. Located inside a tunnel on the DRR's route, the diorama was claimed by Disneyland to be the longest in the world, and during its inauguration it was blessed by Chief Nevangnewa, a 96-year-old Hopi chief. The diorama cost over $367,000 and took 80,000 labor hours to construct.

The addition of the Grand Canyon Diorama in 1958 prompted changes to the Retlaw 2 freight train pulled by the DRR's No. 1 locomotive, which involved adding side-facing bench seating pointed towards Disneyland and red-and-white striped awnings on all of the cattle cars and gondolas. The walls on the cattle cars facing the park were also removed to allow for better views of the diorama. That same year, a third gondola with the same modifications as the other gondolas was added, and a fourth gondola with the same attributes was added in 1959. This brought the total number of freight cars in the train set, now referred to by Disneyland employees as Holiday Red, to eight. Prior to these modifications, the cattle cars and gondolas of this train set had no seating, requiring passengers to stand for the duration of the ride. Despite safety concerns voiced by Ward Kimball related to the lack of seats on these train cars, Disney, for the purpose of authenticity, had insisted that there be no seats on them; he wanted the passengers to feel like cattle on an actual cattle train.

In April 1958, Tomorrowland Station, a new station with a futuristic theme consisting of a covered platform with no station building, was built in the Tomorrowland section for the DRR. The station was updated in 1998 as part of a redevelopment of the Tomorrowland section. Around the same time that the No. 3 locomotive was placed into service in 1958, Roger Broggie decided that a fourth locomotive was needed for the DRR. After Walt Disney concurred, Broggie once again began searching for a narrow-gauge steam locomotive to purchase and restore. Broggie eventually found an advertisement in a rail magazine offering a suitable locomotive for sale in New Jersey, and after contacting the seller, Broggie passed on the information to Gerald Best to research the locomotive. Best was able to determine that the locomotive had been built by Baldwin Locomotive Works in 1925, that it had previously been used to pull tourist trains on the Pine Creek Railroad in New Jersey, and that it had been initially used by the Raritan River Sand Company in New Jersey. After being purchased for $2,000, the locomotive was delivered to the Walt Disney Studios' machine shop where restoration work began, which included installing a new boiler built by Dixon Boiler Works and adding a new tender built by Fleming Metal Fabricators designed to hold diesel oil. (Note: During its shipment, the locomotive was mistakenly sent to a railroad yard in Pittsburgh, Pennsylvania. Disney contacted AT&SF Railway President at the time, Ernest S. Marsh, to correct this error.) This locomotive became the DRR's No. 4 locomotive and it went into service on July 25, 1959, at a cost after restoration of more than $57,000. 1959 was also the year in which E tickets arrived, and the attractions deemed to be the best in the park required them, including the DRR.

=== Changes since 1960 ===
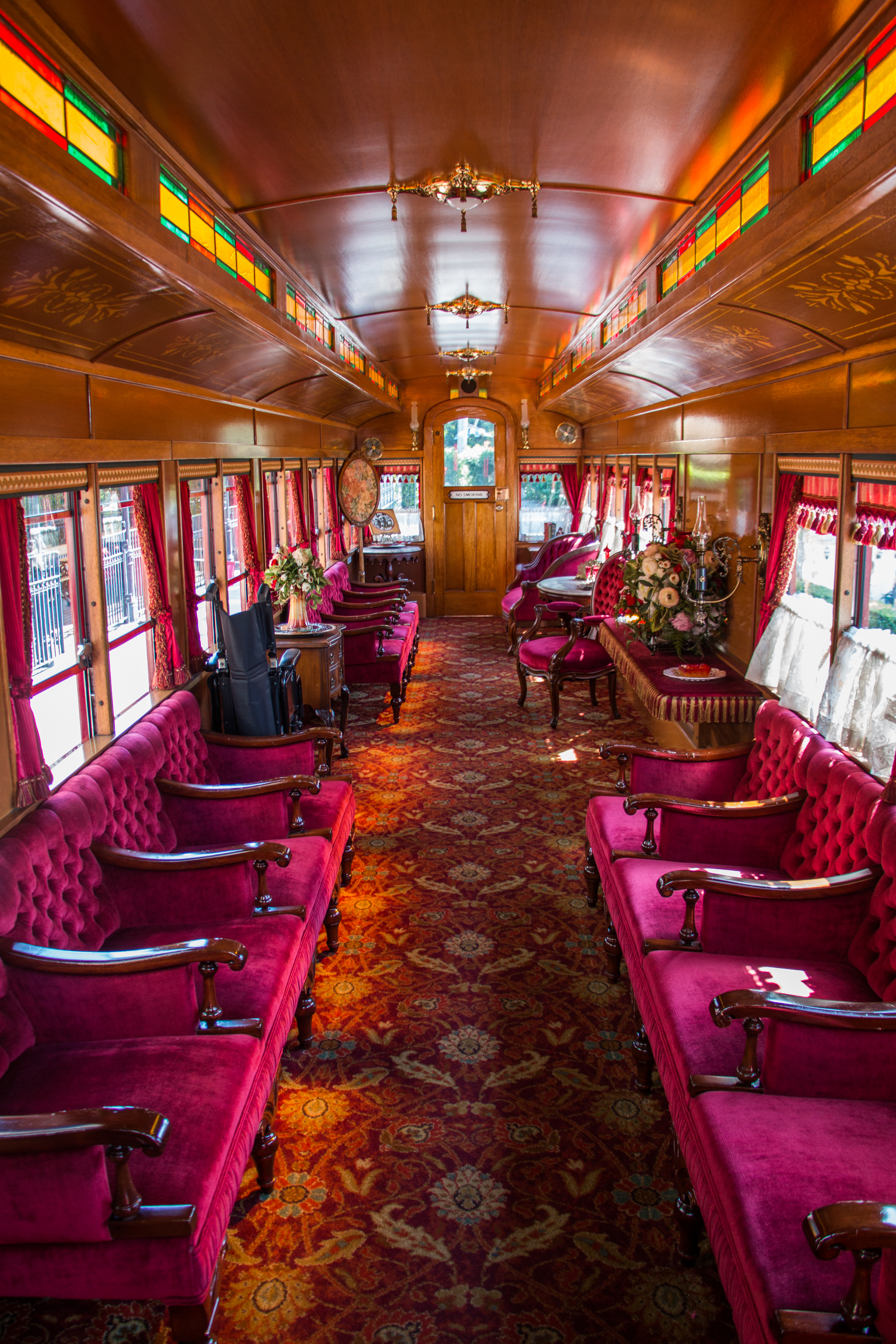
The interior of the DRR's Lilly Belle parlor car

To have sufficient space for the planned New Orleans Square section, the Disneyland Railroad's track on the western edge of its route was expanded outwards again in 1962, Frontierland Station's depot building in that same vicinity was moved across the DRR's track, and a covered platform with no station building was built on the opposite side to serve as the new Frontierland Station. Although the station was no longer in the Frontierland section, its name was not changed to New Orleans Square Station until September 1996.

By 1965, the six passenger cars of the DRR's Retlaw 1 train, due to their slow passenger loading and unloading times, began to be phased out of service. In July 1974, the Retlaw 1 passenger cars were retired and stored in the DRR's roundhouse, except for the Grand Canyon observation coach, which was converted into a parlor car and renamed Lilly Belle after Walt Disney's wife Lillian. The Lilly Belle was given a new exterior paint scheme and a new interior, which included varnished mahogany paneling, velour curtains and seats, a floral-patterned wool rug, and Disney family pictures framed and hung on the walls. The first official passenger to come aboard the Lilly Belle after its conversion into a parlor car in September 1975 was Japanese Emperor Hirohito, and since then it can be regularly seen coupled on the ends of the DRR's trains. In 1996, rail collector Bill Norred acquired the five other Retlaw 1 passenger cars. Norred died two years later, and in 1999 his family sold the four coaches of the former Retlaw 1 passenger train to Rob Rossi, owner of the Pacific Coast Railroad located within Santa Margarita Ranch in Santa Margarita, California, leaving only the Retlaw 1 combine car in the Norred family's possession. On July 10, 2010, the Norred family sold the Retlaw 1 combine car to the Carolwood Foundation, which restored it and put it on display next to Walt Disney's Carolwood Barn within the Los Angeles Live Steamers Railroad Museum complex in Los Angeles' Griffith Park.

In 1966, a five-gondola train set with green-and-white-striped awnings and a five-gondola train set with blue-and-white-striped awnings, referred to by Disneyland employees as Holiday Green and Holiday Blue respectively, were added to the DRR's rolling stock. Both train sets had side-facing bench seating like the Holiday Red freight train. By the time that the new Holiday Green and Holiday Blue trains sets were introduced in 1966, the DRR's original roundhouse, located on the end of a spur line connected to the main line near the Rivers of America in the Frontierland section, had been replaced by a larger roundhouse, located on the end of a new spur line connected to the main line in the Tomorrowland section. The new roundhouse, where the DRR's locomotives and train cars are stored and maintained, was also built to house the storage and maintenance facility for the Disneyland Monorail.

The DRR's Primeval World Diorama was put on display later in 1966, adjacent to the Grand Canyon Diorama. One year prior, the DRR's track on the eastern edge of its route had been expanded outwards to accommodate the diorama's construction. The Audio-Animatronic dinosaurs from Ford's Magic Skyway, one of the attractions created by Disney for the 1964 New York World's Fair, were incorporated into the diorama, including a Tyrannosaurus confronting a Stegosaurus. The diorama was one of the last additions made to the DRR, and Disneyland in general, before the death of Walt Disney on December 15, 1966.

From 1982, A, B, C, D, and E tickets were discontinued in favor of a pay-one-price admission system for Disneyland, allowing visitors to experience all of the park's attractions, including the DRR, as many times as desired. In June 1985, the new Videopolis Station, consisting of a covered platform with no station building, was constructed in the Fantasyland section for the DRR. That same year, the DRR's track on the northern edge of its route was expanded outwards in order to make room for the new Videopolis stage. With the Mickey's Toontown expansion of the park, Mickey's Toontown Depot, a cartoon-themed depot building, replaced Videopolis Station in 1993.

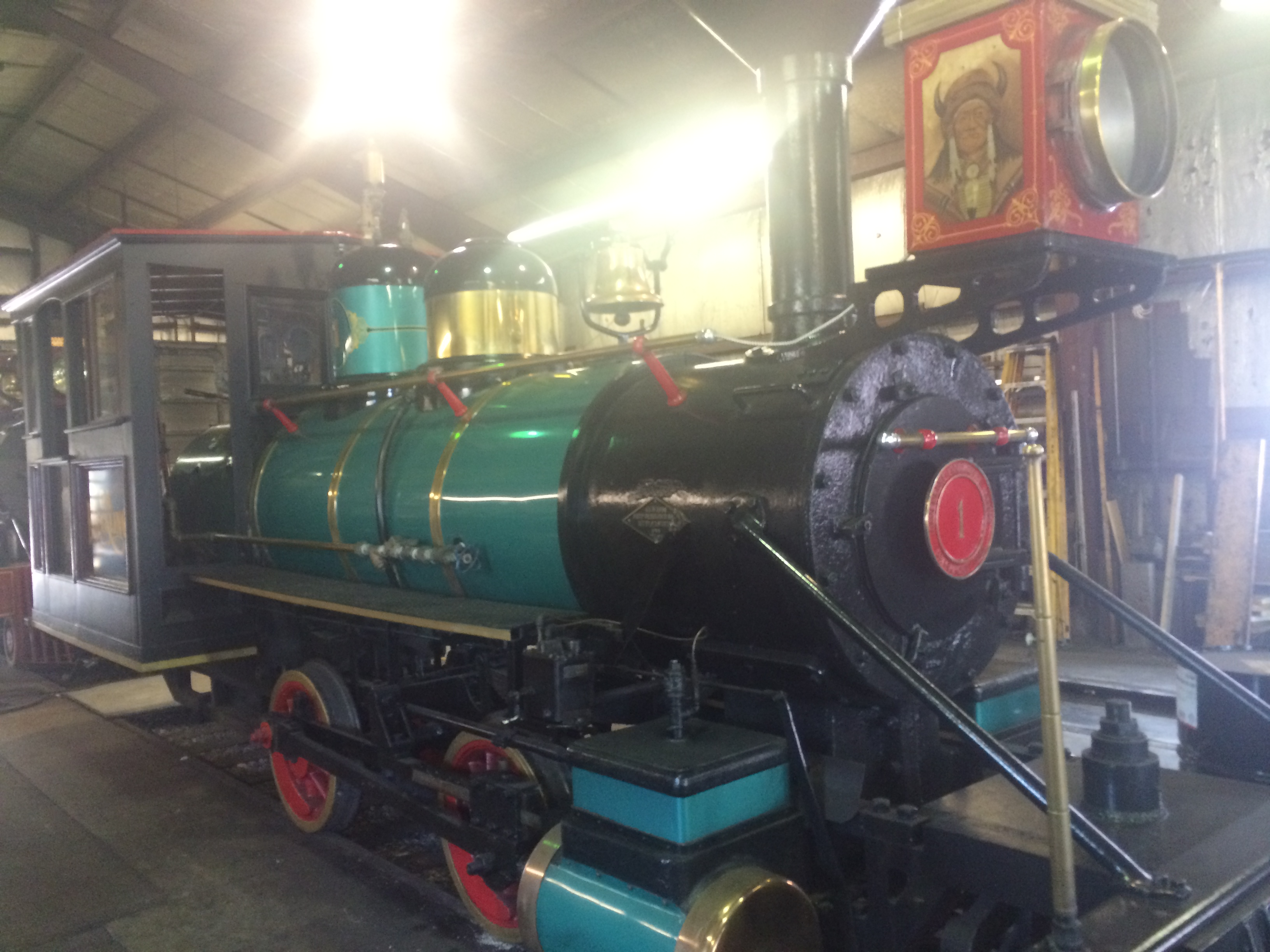
The first Ward Kimball locomotive (pictured, now named Randol D.) was traded to Cedar Point for the current one, due to being too large for the DRR and too small for the WDWRR.

Out of a desire to have four trains regularly running at once each day on the DRR, in the mid-1990s, Disneyland began to search for an additional narrow-gauge steam locomotive to add to the railroad's rolling stock. One such locomotive was acquired from Bill Norred in 1996 in exchange for the combine car and four coaches from the DRR's retired Retlaw 1 passenger train set, but after the park received it, the new locomotive was deemed to be too large for the DRR's operations. In 1997, it was sent to the Walt Disney World Railroad in the Magic Kingdom park of Walt Disney World in Bay Lake, Florida, where the locomotive was dedicated, despite being too small for the railroad's operations, and named after Disney animator and rail enthusiast Ward Kimball. Still needing a fifth locomotive for the DRR, the park traded the Ward Kimball locomotive in 1999 to the Cedar Point & Lake Erie Railroad in the Cedar Point amusement park in Sandusky, Ohio, for a new locomotive suitable for the railroad. Named Maud L., the locomotive was built by Baldwin Locomotive Works in 1902 and was originally used to haul sugar cane at the Laurel Valley Sugar Plantation in Louisiana owned by the Barker and Lepine Company. After arriving in Disneyland, the Maud L., later renamed Ward Kimball like the locomotive for which it was traded, was given a new cab built by Disney and a new boiler built by Hercules Power, which was subcontracted by Superior Boiler Works.

Due to budget issues, the restoration of the locomotive was suspended not long after its arrival, and its parts were planned to be placed in long-term storage in late 2003. The Ward Kimball locomotive's restoration efforts were resurrected soon after, when it was decided that its addition to the DRR would be incorporated into the celebration of Disneyland's fiftieth anniversary in July 2005. In late 2004, Boschan Boiler and Restorations in Carson, California, led by Paul Boschan, a former roundhouse manager and engineer at the Roaring Camp & Big Trees Narrow Gauge Railroad in Felton, California, was awarded the contract to complete the restoration of the Ward Kimball. The restoration work performed included installing new driving wheels, attaching a new smokebox door, and applying gold-leaf silhouettes of Kimball's Jiminy Cricket character on the sides of the headlamp. The Ward Kimball locomotive, which entered service on June 25, 2005, became the DRR's No. 5 locomotive, and on February 15 the following year, John Kimball, the son of Ward Kimball, who died in 2002, christened the locomotive during its dedication ceremony. In 2011, Ward Kimball's grandson Nate Lord became a DRR engineer and frequently drove the Ward Kimball locomotive.

A few weeks before the debut of the No. 5 locomotive, the railroad, for the first time in its history, hosted a privately owned train on its track. On the morning of May 10, before Disneyland opened for the day, a private ceremony was held at New Orleans Square Station to honor Disney animator and rail enthusiast Ollie Johnston, supposedly to thank him for helping to inspire Walt Disney's passion for trains, which led to the creation of Disneyland. The true motive for having Johnston there was soon revealed when a simple steam train not part of the DRR's rolling stock, consisting of a locomotive named Marie E. and a caboose, rolled towards the station and stopped at its platform. Johnston, a previous owner of the steam train, used to run it on his vacation property, which he sold, along with the train, in 1993. The man who now owned the train was Pixar film director John Lasseter, who had brought the train to Disneyland in order to give Johnston, his mentor, an opportunity to reunite with and drive his former locomotive. Johnston, then in his nineties, was helped into the Marie E., and with Lasseter at his side, he grasped the locomotive's throttle and drove his former possession three times around the DRR's main line. Although Johnston died in 2008, Lasseter continues to run the Marie E., the caboose, and an assortment of train cars on his private Justi Creek Railway.

The diesel oil used for fuel to generate steam in the DRR's locomotives was replaced in April 2007 with B98 biodiesel, consisting of two percent diesel oil and ninety-eight percent soybean oil. Due to problems with storing the soybean-based biodiesel, the DRR briefly switched back to conventional diesel oil in November 2008 before adopting new biodiesel incorporating recycled cooking oil in January 2009.

On January 11, 2016, the DRR temporarily closed to accommodate the construction of Star Wars: Galaxy's Edge. Additionally, the original DRR roundhouse building, which became a maintenance facility for ride vehicles of other Disneyland attractions, was demolished around April 2016. The DRR reopened on July 29, 2017, with a new route along the northern edge of the Rivers of America named Columbia Gorge, which features rock formations, waterfalls, a trestle bridge, and the line's only left-hand turn. The DRR's dioramas were also given new special projection effects. During a media preview for the attraction's reopening the previous day, Lasseter brought his Marie E. locomotive and drove it along the DRR's new route. Pulled behind the Marie E. were an inoperable locomotive and train car, which were both previously owned by Ward Kimball and run on his former Grizzly Flats Railroad. The inoperable locomotive, named Chloe, and the train car are now owned by the Southern California Railway Museum (formerly the Orange Empire Railway Museum) in Perris, California, which was in the process of restoring the Chloe to operating condition at the time of the DRR's media preview.

On May 31, 2023, the Splash Mountain log flume attraction containing one of the DRR tunnels permanently closed to be rethemed as Tiana's Bayou Adventure. The DRR temporarily closed between August 24 and 25 due to work being done on the former Splash Mountain tunnel. In late January 2024, the New Orleans Square Station was temporarily closed due to retheming with the Haunted Mansion ride. On August 5 that same year, the DRR was temporarily closed for complete track maintenance. It reopened on October 25. In January 2025, the DRR closed again for more track maintenance between the Main Street, USA and New Orleans Square sections. The DRR reopened on March 7, 2025.

== Ride experience ==
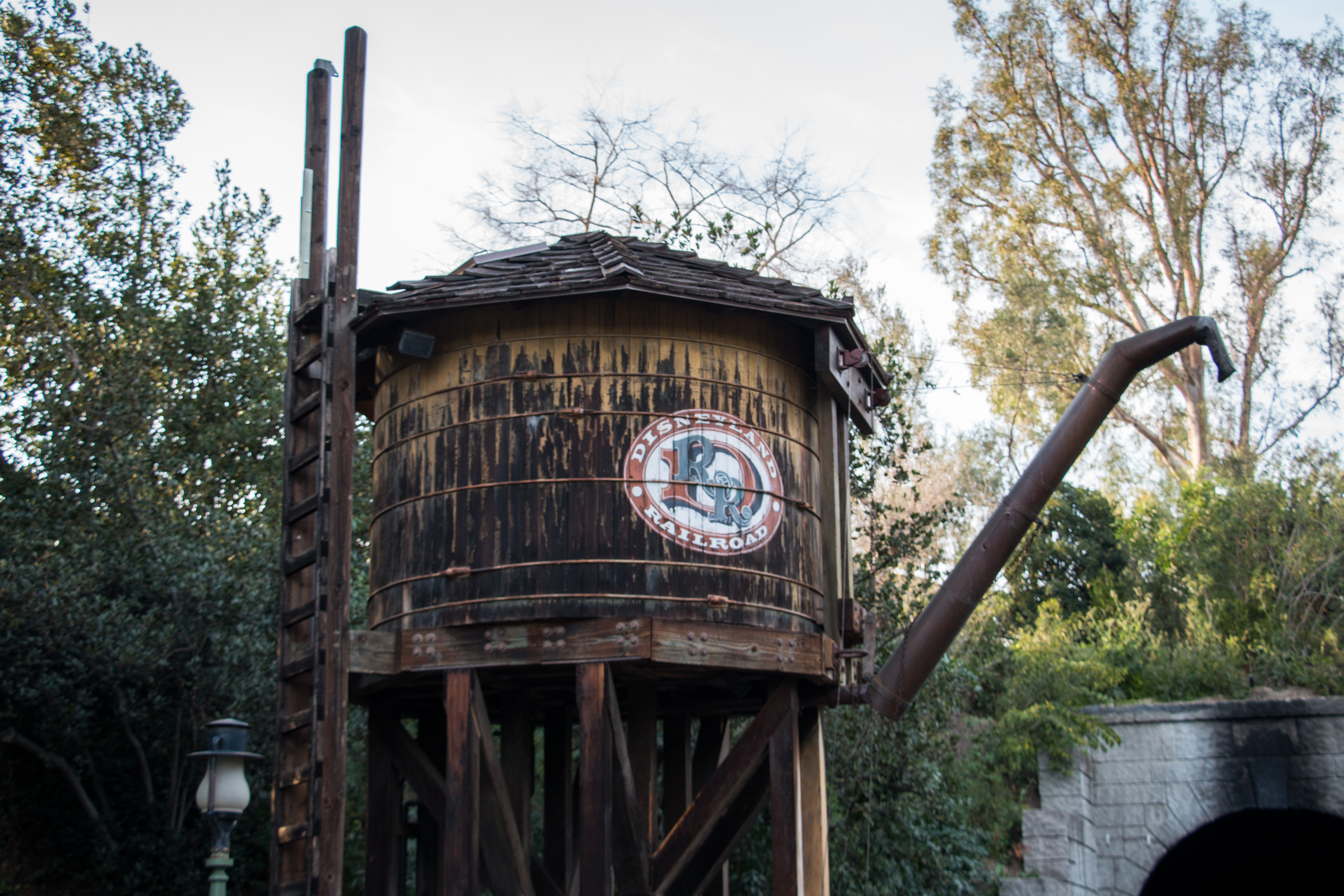
The DRR's water tower at New Orleans Square Station

Beginning at Main Street, USA Station adjacent to Disneyland's entrance, where a pump-style handcar built by the Kalamazoo Manufacturing Company can be seen on a siding, the trains of the Disneyland Railroad travel along its single track in a clockwise direction on its circular route. The train will take around 18 minutes to complete a round trip on the mainline when three trains are running, and 20 minutes when four trains are running; on any given day, between two and four trains run, with three trains running on average. Each train arrives at each station every 5-10 minutes. The entire round trip features pre-recorded commentary timed to each individual car. Several late actors such as Jack Wagner, Thurl Ravenscroft, and Earl Boen have provided their voice for the various versions of the trip, with the current voice being Bob Joles since 2017. An engineer accompanied by a fireman operates the locomotive, while conductors at each end of the train supervise the passengers. Prior to departing Main Street, USA Station, the engineer must confirm whether the signal light in the locomotive's cab is green, indicating that the track segment ahead is clear, or red, indicating that the track segment ahead is occupied by another train. The DRR's route is divided into eleven such segments, or blocks, and each locomotive has a block signal in its cab to communicate the status of each block. Prior to the installation of cab signalling in the locomotives around 2005, the status of each block along the railroad's 1.2 miles (1.9 km) of main-line track was displayed by track-side block signals, of which only the ones at the four stations remain. The speed limit of the DRR is 10–15 mph (16–24 km/h).

Once the signal light in the locomotive turns green, the journey from the Main Street, USA section begins with the train traversing a small bridge, passing by the Adventureland section, and going through a tunnel before arriving at New Orleans Square Station in the New Orleans Square section. While the train is stopped at this station, where the locomotive takes on water from the railroad's water tower if needed, the train crew will perform a boiler blowdown on the locomotive. At the old Frontierland Station depot building, a sound effect of a telegraph operator using a telegraph key to enter Morse code can be heard emanating the statement "To all who come to this happy place: welcome. Disneyland is your land." Adjacent to the old Frontierland Station depot building, a freight house building used as a train crew break and storage area can be seen, as well as a fully functioning historic semaphore signal connected to the station's block signal.

After the journey restarts, the train travels past the Haunted Mansion dark ride attraction, enters a tunnel with gaps that allow riders to see into the Tiana's Bayou Adventure log flume attraction, and crosses a trestle bridge over the Bayou Country section and past the Hungry Bear Barbecue Jamboree restaurant. It then moves over another trestle bridge that wraps around the Rivers of America in the Frontierland section, giving riders a unique view of the features as well as some animal maquettes not viewable to regular guests. Occasionally, the Mark Twain Riverboat can be seen in the Rivers of America alongside the train, at which time they will play whistle tag by sounding their whistles at each other to the tune of Shave and a Haircut. Afterwards, the train rolls past the Big Thunder Mountain Railroad roller coaster attraction and through another tunnel before reaching Mickey's Toontown Depot between the Mickey's Toontown and Fantasyland sections. While the train is stopped at this station, a non-functioning water tower can be seen on the opposite side of the track to the station's depot building.

Once the journey resumes, the train moves across an overpass and passes through the façade of the It's a Small World water-based dark ride attraction before reaching a fuel pump disguised as a boulder, where the train stops if the locomotive needs to be refueled. From this point, the train cuts across an access road, with the train having the right of way if a parade is occurring. Also in this area is a billboard titled "Agrifuture." The train then goes underneath the track of the Disneyland Monorail before stopping at Tomorrowland Station in the Tomorrowland section. A synthesized composition of the song There's a Great Big Beautiful Tomorrow, originally composed for the Carousel of Progress, plays during this stretch of the journey.

When the journey continues, the train goes across another access road and enters a tunnel containing the Grand Canyon Diorama followed by the Primeval World Diorama. As the train runs alongside the Grand Canyon Diorama, the main theme from On the Trail, the third movement of Ferde Grofé's Grand Canyon Suite, can be heard; and as the train runs alongside the Primeval World Diorama, music from the 1961 film Mysterious Island can be heard. Shortly after leaving the tunnel, the train arrives back at Main Street, USA Station, completing what the park refers to as The Grand Circle Tour.

Disneyland Railroad stations

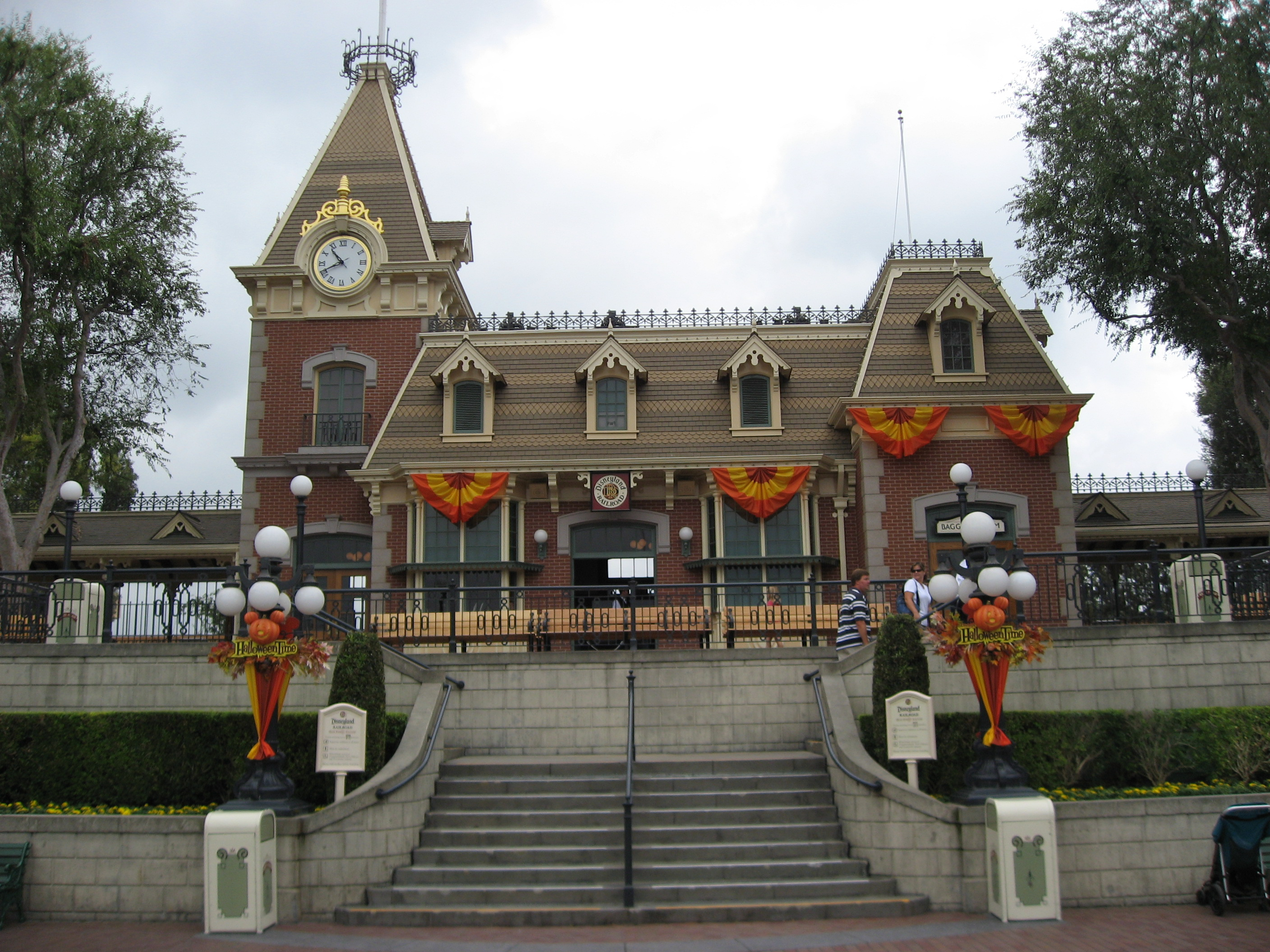
Main Street, USA Station

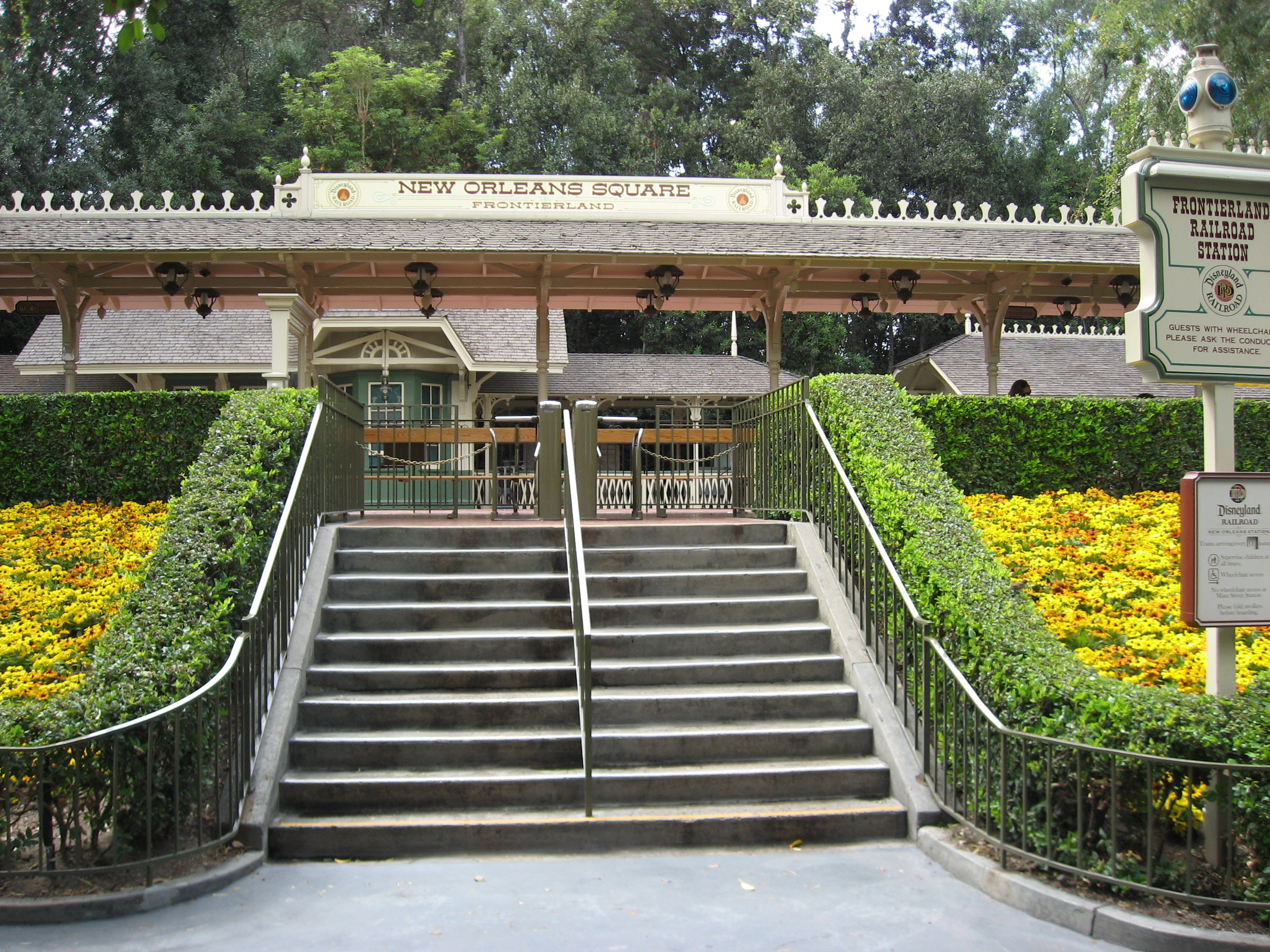
New Orleans Square Station

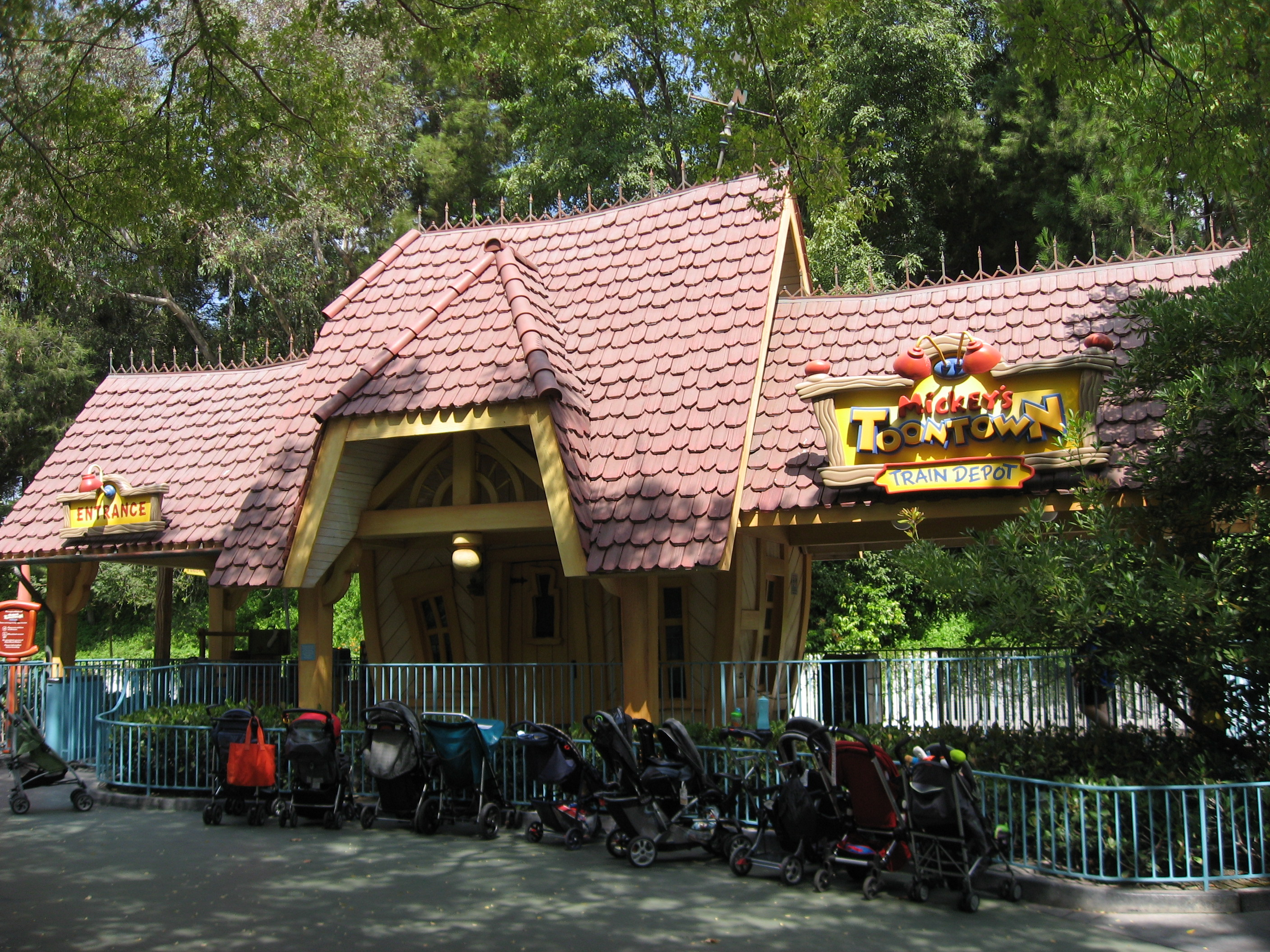
Mickey's Toontown Depot

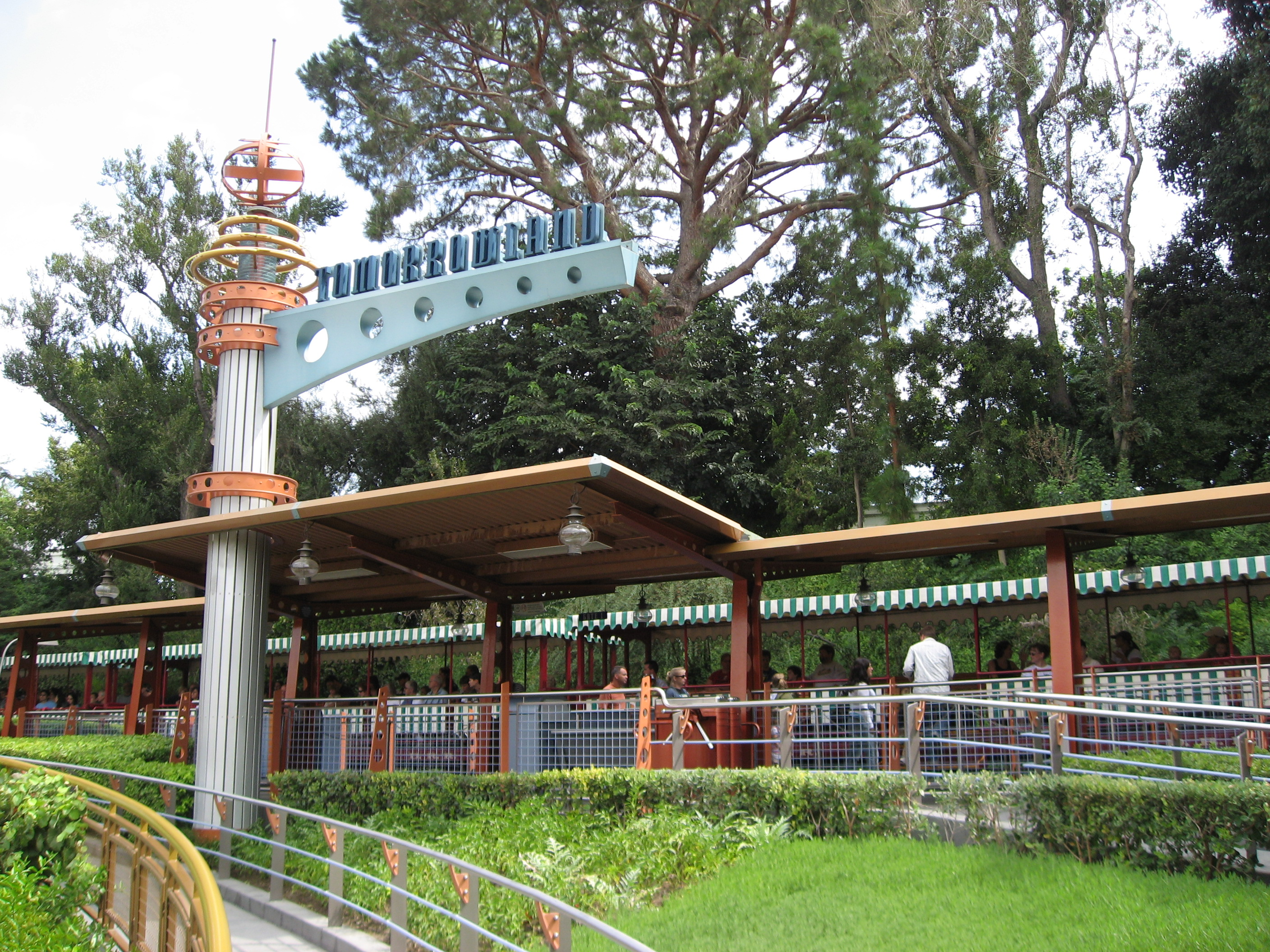
Tomorrowland Station

The DRR usually runs at night during evening fireworks shows, but sometimes closes due to adverse weather conditions. An option to ride on a seat in the tenders of the DRR's Nos. 1, 2, and 4 locomotives is available upon request at Main Street, USA Station at the start of each operating day. The option to ride in the DRR's Lilly Belle parlor car is also available upon request at Main Street, USA Station when a Disneyland employee is available to monitor the passengers aboard it and no heavy rain is falling. The DRR's roundhouse, which cannot normally be viewed by the public, is made available for viewing to participants of specific runDisney events where the race course organized for the runners goes past the facility. On May 11, 2024, the DRR's roundhouse opened to guests taking the new Disneyland Railroad Guided Tour.

== Rolling stock ==
=== Locomotives ===
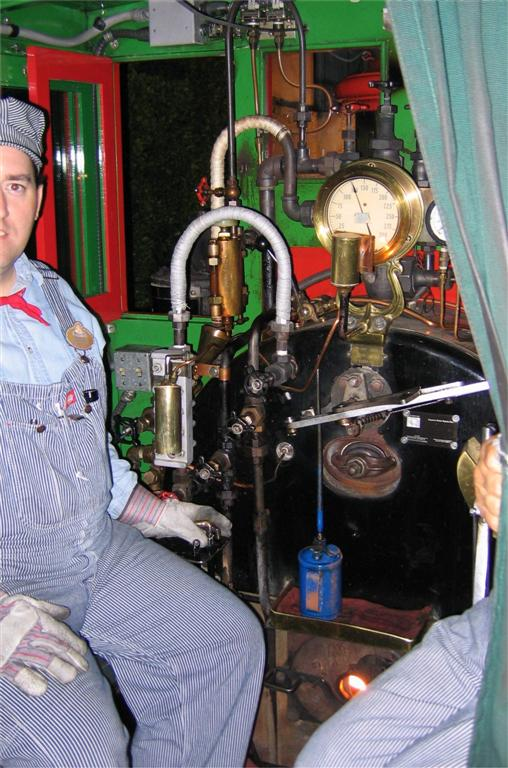
A view of the backhead inside the cab of the DRR's No. 1 locomotive (C.K. Holliday)

The first four steam locomotives to enter service on the Disneyland Railroad are named after former AT&SF Railway presidents. The fifth is named after a former Disney animator. Walt Disney himself, after putting on an engineer's outfit, occasionally drove the DRR's locomotives when they were pulling trains with passengers on board. Each year, the DRR locomotive fleet consumes about 200,000 US gallons (760,000 L) of fuel. The DRR locomotives each require 75 US gallons (280 L) gallons of water for one trip around the park. Since 2006, the DRR locomotives have been featured as static displays multiple times at Fullerton Railroad Days, an annual festival that takes place at the Fullerton Transportation Center in Fullerton, California. Since 2010, the DRR locomotives received overhauls one by one at the Hillcrest Shops in Reedley, California.

Disneyland Railroad locomotive details
Number and name	Namesake	Image	Wheel arrangement	Date built	Builder	Serial number	Date entered service	Status	Notes
1 C.K. Holliday	Cyrus K. Holliday	A red steam locomotive with a 4-4-0 wheel arrangement (four leading wheels, four driving wheels, and no trailing wheels) and its tender	4-4-0 (American)	1955	WED Enterprises	12544	July 17, 1955	Operational	Designed to resemble Walt Disney's miniature Lilly Belle locomotive, which had been modeled after the Central Pacific No. 173 locomotive.
2 E.P. Ripley	Edward Payson Ripley	A green steam locomotive with a 4-4-0 wheel arrangement and its tender	4-4-0 (American)	1955	WED Enterprises	12555	July 17, 1955	Operational	Designed to resemble the Baltimore and Ohio No. 774 locomotive, per advice from Gerald Best. This locomotive is mechanically identical to the DRR's No. 1 locomotive. It was also Walt Disney's favorite locomotive. During its overhaul at the Hillcrest Shops, it received a new boiler, a new headlamp, and a new bell.
3 Fred Gurley	Fred Gurley	A green steam locomotive with a 2-4-4T wheel arrangement and no tender	2-4-4RT (Boston)	August 1894	Baldwin Locomotive Works	14065	March 28, 1958	Operational	Originally built as a Forney locomotive with a 0-4-4T wheel arrangement. A commemorative plaque celebrating this locomotive's centennial was mounted under its running board in 1994. During its overhaul from 2007 to 2008, it received a new boiler built by Boschan Boiler and Restorations.
4 Ernest S. Marsh	Ernest S. Marsh	A red steam locomotive with a 2-4-0 wheel arrangement and its tender	2-4-0 (Porter)	April 1925	Baldwin Locomotive Works	58367	July 25, 1959	Operational	Originally built as a 0-4-0ST and later rebuilt as a 0-4-0 tender locomotive. Designed to resemble the Denver & Rio Grande Montezuma locomotive, per advice from Ward Kimball. It was the first DRR locomotive to receive an overhaul at the Hillcrest Shops.
5 Ward Kimball	Ward Kimball	A red steam locomotive with a 2-4-4T wheel arrangement (two leading wheels, four driving wheels, and four trailing wheels) and no tender	2-4-4RT (Boston)	September 1902	Baldwin Locomotive Works	20925	June 25, 2005	Under overhaul	Originally built as a Forney locomotive with a 0-4-4T wheel arrangement.

=== Train cars ===
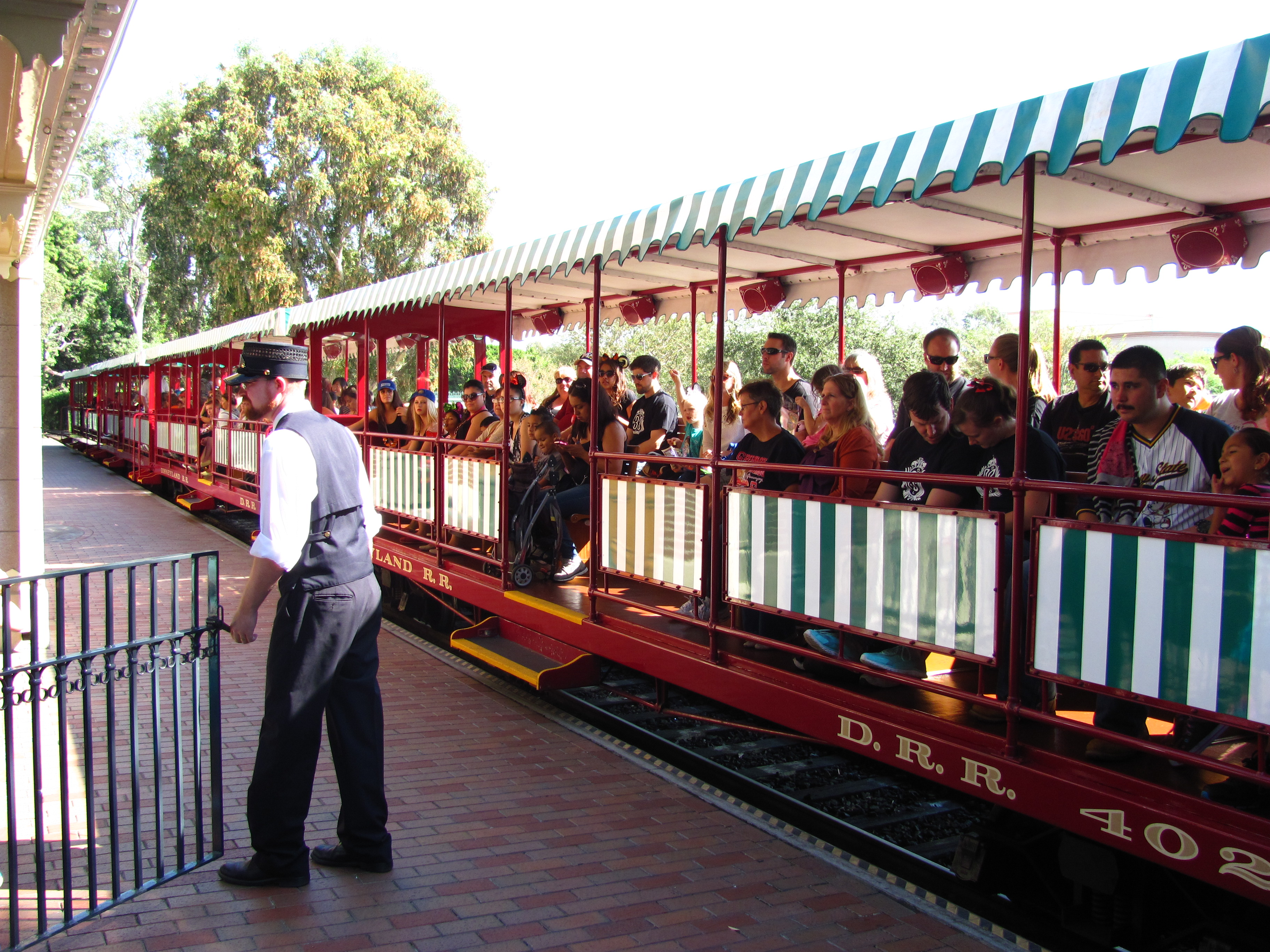
The DRR's Holiday Green train

The Disneyland Railroad today operates four sets of train cars, as well as a parlor car. The combine car from the railroad's former Retlaw 1 passenger train, one of the DRR's two original train sets, was Walt Disney's favorite train car on the railroad, as it brought back memories from his youth working as a news butcher on the Missouri Pacific Railway. On May 5 and 6, 2012, the Retlaw 1 combine car and the Lilly Belle parlor car were temporarily put on static display at Fullerton Railroad Days.

Disneyland Railroad train car details
Train set name	Seating arrangement	Capacity	Train car number	Train car name	Train car type	Date entered service	Date retired from service	Current location
Retlaw 1	Front-facing	268 (including Grand Canyon observation coach)	101	Wells Fargo Express	Combine car	July 17, 1955	July 1974	Los Angeles Live Steamers Railroad Museum (Griffith Park, Los Angeles, California)
Retlaw 1	Front-facing	268 (including Grand Canyon observation coach)	102	Navajo Chief	Coach	July 17, 1955	July 1974	Pacific Coast Railroad (Santa Margarita Ranch, Santa Margarita, California)
Retlaw 1	Front-facing	268 (including Grand Canyon observation coach)	103	Colorado Rockies	Coach	July 17, 1955	July 1974	Pacific Coast Railroad (Santa Margarita Ranch, Santa Margarita, California)
Retlaw 1	Front-facing	268 (including Grand Canyon observation coach)	104	Land of Pueblos	Coach	July 17, 1955	July 1974	Pacific Coast Railroad (Santa Margarita Ranch, Santa Margarita, California)
Retlaw 1	Front-facing	268 (including Grand Canyon observation coach)	105	Painted Desert	Coach	July 17, 1955	July 1974	Pacific Coast Railroad (Santa Margarita Ranch, Santa Margarita, California)
Retlaw 1	Side-facing	15 (after Lilly Belle parlor car conversion)	106	Lilly Belle (formerly Grand Canyon)	Parlor car (formerly an observation coach)	July 17, 1955 (observation coach); September 1975 (parlor car)	–	Disneyland Railroad (Disneyland, Anaheim, California)
Holiday Red (formerly Retlaw 2)	Side-facing	264	201 (Note: No. 201's position had been switched over with No. 202 for a better audio experience since August 2015.)	–	Cattle car	July 17, 1955	–	Disneyland Railroad (Disneyland, Anaheim, California)
Holiday Red (formerly Retlaw 2)	Side-facing	264	202	–	Gondola	July 17, 1955	–	Disneyland Railroad (Disneyland, Anaheim, California)
Holiday Red (formerly Retlaw 2)	Side-facing	264	203	–	Cattle car	July 17, 1955	–	Disneyland Railroad (Disneyland, Anaheim, California)
Holiday Red (formerly Retlaw 2)	Side-facing	264	204	–	Gondola	July 17, 1955	–	Disneyland Railroad (Disneyland, Anaheim, California)
Holiday Red (formerly Retlaw 2)	Side-facing	264	205	–	Cattle car	July 17, 1955	–	Disneyland Railroad (Disneyland, Anaheim, California)
Holiday Red (formerly Retlaw 2)	Side-facing	264	206	–	Gondola	1958	–	Disneyland Railroad (Disneyland, Anaheim, California)
Holiday Red (formerly Retlaw 2)	Side-facing	264	207	–	Gondola	1959	–	Disneyland Railroad (Disneyland, Anaheim, California)
Holiday Red (formerly Retlaw 2)	Side-facing	264	208	–	Caboose	July 17, 1955	–	Disneyland Railroad (Disneyland, Anaheim, California)
Excursion Train	Front-facing	325	301	–	Narragansett-style excursion car	Early 1958	–	Disneyland Railroad (Disneyland, Anaheim, California)
Excursion Train	Front-facing	325	302	–	Narragansett-style excursion car	Early 1958	–	Disneyland Railroad (Disneyland, Anaheim, California)
Excursion Train	Front-facing	325	303	–	Narragansett-style excursion car	Early 1958	–	Disneyland Railroad (Disneyland, Anaheim, California)
Excursion Train	Front-facing	325	304	–	Narragansett-style excursion car	Early 1958	–	Disneyland Railroad (Disneyland, Anaheim, California)
Excursion Train	Front-facing	325	305	–	Narragansett-style excursion car	Early 1958	–	Disneyland Railroad (Disneyland, Anaheim, California)
Holiday Green	Side-facing	215	401	–	Gondola	Early 1966	–	Disneyland Railroad (Disneyland, Anaheim, California)
Holiday Green	Side-facing	215	402	–	Gondola	Early 1966	–	Disneyland Railroad (Disneyland, Anaheim, California)
Holiday Green	Side-facing	215	403	–	Gondola	Early 1966	–	Disneyland Railroad (Disneyland, Anaheim, California)
Holiday Green	Side-facing	215	404	–	Gondola	Early 1966	–	Disneyland Railroad (Disneyland, Anaheim, California)
Holiday Green	Side-facing	215	405	–	Gondola	Early 1966	–	Disneyland Railroad (Disneyland, Anaheim, California)
Holiday Blue	Side-facing	215	501	–	Gondola	Early 1966	–	Disneyland Railroad (Disneyland, Anaheim, California)
Holiday Blue	Side-facing	215	502	–	Gondola	Early 1966	–	Disneyland Railroad (Disneyland, Anaheim, California)
Holiday Blue	Side-facing	215	503	–	Gondola	Early 1966	–	Disneyland Railroad (Disneyland, Anaheim, California)
Holiday Blue	Side-facing	215	504	–	Gondola	Early 1966	–	Disneyland Railroad (Disneyland, Anaheim, California)
Holiday Blue	Side-facing	215	505	–	Gondola	Early 1966	–	Disneyland Railroad (Disneyland, Anaheim, California)

== Incidents ==
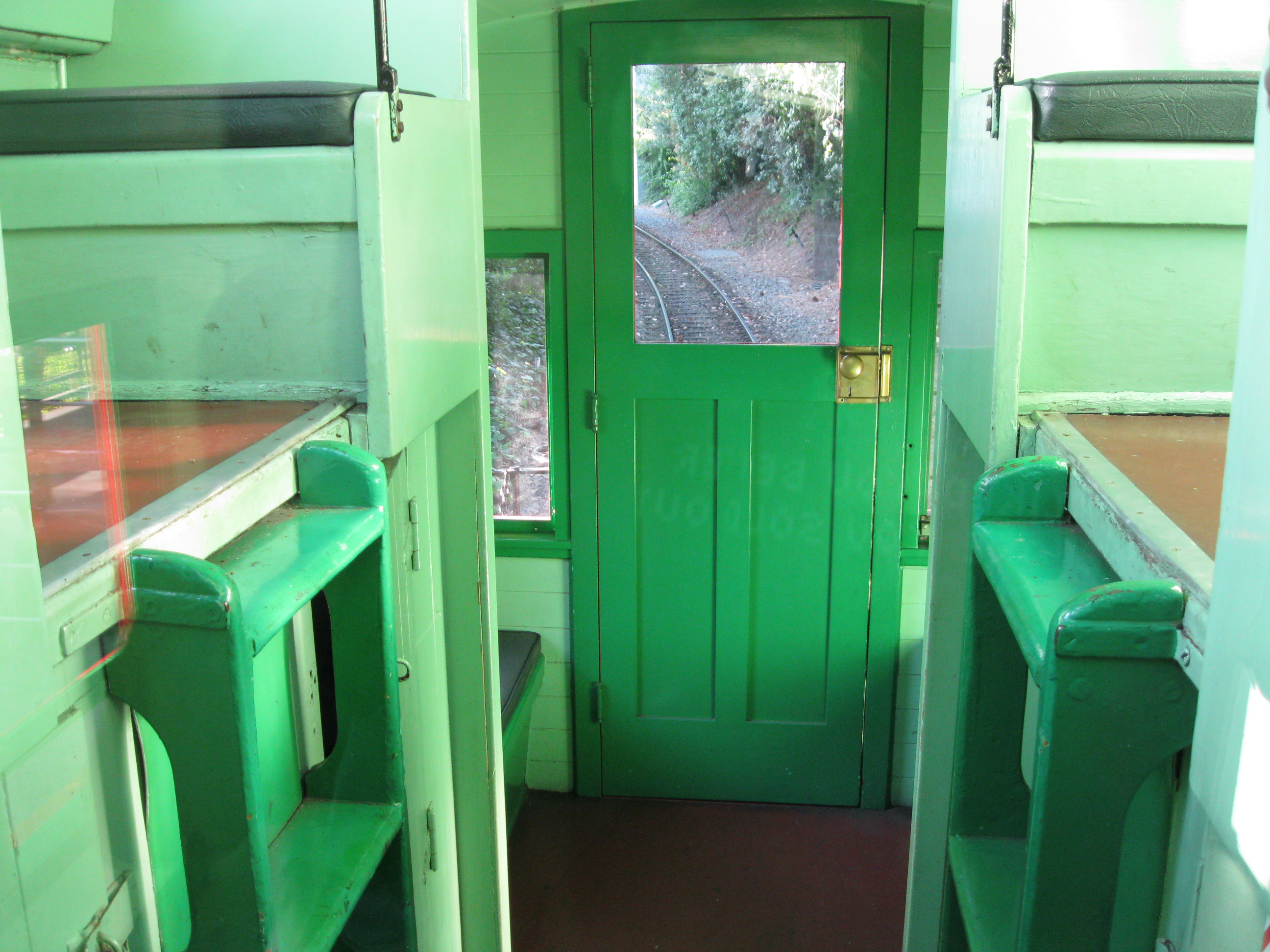
The interior of the DRR's caboose

- Within a week of Disneyland's opening on July 17, 1955, a brakeman pulled the switch connecting the Disneyland Railroad's main line with a siding at Main Street, USA Station too soon as the Retlaw 2 freight train on the siding was passing the Retlaw 1 passenger train stopped at the station on the main line. The caboose on the end of the freight train had not made it fully across the switch when it was pulled, and as a result the caboose's front set of wheels correctly traveled along the siding while the rear set of wheels incorrectly traveled along the main line towards the passenger train, causing the caboose to swing to the side before colliding with a concrete slab and derailing upon impact. During the ensuing commotion, the erring brakeman, presumably to avoid disciplinary action, quietly left the scene of the accident, exited the park, and was not seen again. No injuries were reported, and by the following year the use of sidings at stations on the DRR's main line came to an end.
- In February 2000, a tree in the Adventureland section fell onto the DRR's Holiday Red freight train while it was in motion, damaging the awnings and their supports on the gondolas as well as knocking off the cupola on top of the caboose before the train came to a stop. No injuries occurred as a result of this accident.
- On the night of April 4, 2004, at Tomorrowland Station, accumulated diesel fumes in the firebox of the DRR's No. 3 locomotive exploded after its fire suddenly went out. The explosion ejected the engineer from the locomotive's cab and inflicted serious burns on the fireman.
- On the afternoon of August 11, 2019, the DRR's No. 5 locomotive broke down on a trestle over the entrance to Star Wars: Galaxy's Edge with a broken axle, forcing an evacuation of the train. No injuries were reported and the DRR was back in service by the following day.
- Between the night of December 28 and early morning of December 29, 2022, a fire broke out in the New Orleans Square section, damaging the freight depot. The cause of the fire was investigated.
- On May 26, 2023, one of the DRR locomotives broke down on a trestle bridge over the Critter Country section near the entrance to Star Wars: Galaxy's Edge, forcing an evacuation of the train 45 minutes later.

== See also ==
- AT&SF No. 3751 steam locomotive
- Ghost Town & Calico Railroad
- Rail transport in Walt Disney Parks and Resorts

== Bibliography ==
- Amendola, Dana (2015). All Aboard: The Wonderful World of Disney Trains (1st ed.). Disney Editions. ISBN 978-1-4231-1714-8.
- Broggie, Michael (2006). Walt Disney's Railroad Story: The Small-Scale Fascination That Led to a Full-Scale Kingdom (2nd ed.). Virginia Beach, Virginia: The Donning Company Publishers. ISBN 9781578643097. OCLC 756842761 – via Google Books.
- Broggie, Michael (2014). Walt Disney's Railroad Story: The Small-Scale Fascination That Led to a Full-Scale Kingdom (4th ed.). The Donning Company Publishers. ISBN 978-1-57864-914-3.
- DeGaetano, Steve (2015a). The Disneyland Railroad: A Complete History in Words and Pictures (2nd ed.). Theme Park Press. ISBN 978-1-941500-56-9.
- DeGaetano, Steve (2015b). The Ward Kimball: The Story of Disneyland Engine No. 5 (2nd ed.). Theme Park Press. ISBN 978-1-941500-58-3.
- Glischinski, Steve (2008). Santa Fe Railway. MBI Railroad Color History (2nd ed.). Voyageur Press. ISBN 978-0-7603-3335-8.
- Smith, Dave (2012). Disney Trivia from the Vault: Secrets Revealed and Questions Answered (1st ed.). Disney Editions. ISBN 978-1-4231-5370-2.
- Strodder, Chris (2017). The Disneyland Encyclopedia: The unofficial, unauthorized, and unprecedented history of every land, attraction, restaurant, shop, and major event in the original Magic Kingdom (3rd ed.). Santa Monica Press. ISBN 978-1-595800-90-9.
- Trahan, Kendra D. (2005). Disneyland Detective: An Independent Guide to Discovering Disney's Legend, Lore, and Magic! (1st ed.). PermaGrin Publishing. ISBN 978-0-9717464-0-4.
- Veness, Susan (2015). The Hidden Magic of Walt Disney World: Over 600 Secrets of the Magic Kingdom, Epcot, Disney's Hollywood Studios, and Disney's Animal Kingdom (2nd ed.). Adams Media. ISBN 978-1-4405-8780-1.
