= Gerald M. Best =

Railroad historian, author, photographer

Gerald M. Best (1895–1985) was a noted railroad historian, writer, photographer, and one of the top sound engineers in the motion picture industry.

After receiving an electrical engineering degree from Cornell, Best served in the Army Signal Corps, worked for AT&T, and then went to work for Warner Brothers in 1928, where his knowledge of sound technology was very useful as the age of talking pictures began. In 1958, he went to work for Walt Disney, taking responsibility for Disneyland’s railroad. After retiring in 1962, he served as an advisor to the President’s Golden Spike Centennial Commission and the Golden Spike National Historic Site. Under his guidance as Engineering Consultant and National Park Service Representative, the National Park Service ordered the construction of two steam locomotives by O'Connor Engineering Laboratories as replicas of the famous Central Pacific Jupiter and Union Pacific No. 119, which met at Promontory Summit, Utah in 1869.

Best collected over 130,000 railroad photographs, negatives, blueprints and other records – one of the largest collections ever assembled. After his death, his widow, Harriet, arranged for it to go to the California State Railroad Museum in Sacramento. Best wrote over a dozen books, as well as numerous articles on railroad history.

In 1948, he purchased an 1883 steam engine for $250 from the Waimanalo Sugar Plantation in Hawaii, which had been using it in the harvesting of sugar cane. With the help of Chadwell O'Connor, he meticulously restored the locomotive. The engine was kept for many years on the Grizzly Flats Railroad in San Gabriel, California, which was owned by fellow railroad enthusiast Ward Kimball. Named the Olomana, Best donated the engine to the Smithsonian Institution in 1977.

== Partial list of books by Gerald Best ==
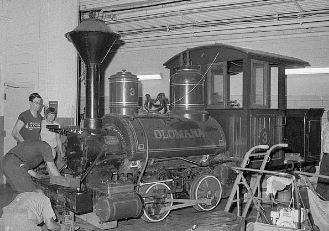
Gerald M. Best's steam engine, the Olomana, at the Smithsonian. The engine is currently on loan to the Railroad Museum of Pennsylvania.

Below is a partial list of notable books written by Gerald Best:

- American Railroad Journal, 1966
- Central American Holiday: A Guide to the Railroads of El Salvador, Guatemala and Mexico
- Iron Horses to Promontory
- Locomotives of the Southern Pacific Company
- Mexican Narrow Gauge
- Minisink Valley Express: A History of the Port Jervis, Monticello & New York Railroad
- Nevada County Narrow Gauge
- Promontory's Locomotives
- Railroads of Hawaii: Narrow and Standard Gauge Common Carriers
- Ships and Narrow Gauge Rails: The Story of the Pacific Coast Company
- Snowplow: Clearing Mountain Rails
- Sugar Trains: Narrow Gauge Rails of Hawaii
- The Last Spike is Driven
- The Ulster and Delaware: Railroad Through the Catskills

== See also ==
- Rail transport in Walt Disney Parks and Resorts

== Bibliography ==
- Broggie, Michael (2014), Walt Disney's Railroad Story: The Small-Scale Fascination That Led to a Full-Scale Kingdom (4th ed.), The Donning Company Publishers, ISBN 978-1-57864-914-3
- Menke, Arnold S. (1988). Gerald M. Best’s “Autobiography of a Railfan.” Railroad History, No. 158, 14–71.
