= List of Disneyland Park (Paris) attractions =

Disneyland Park is a theme park at Disneyland Paris in Marne-la-Vallée, near Paris, France. These are the attractions found in the Disneyland Park.

== Main Street USA ==
- Discovery Arcade
- Disneyland Railroad – Main Street Station
- Gardens of Wonder
- Horse-Drawn Streetcar
- Liberty Arcade
- Main Street Vehicles

== Adventureland ==
- Adventure Isle
- Adventureland Bazaar
- Indiana Jones et le Temple du Péril (Indiana Jones and the Temple of Peril)
- La Cabane des Robinson (Swiss Family Treehouse)
- La Plage des Pirates (Pirates Beach)
- Le Passage Enchanté d'Aladdin (Aladdin's Enchanted Passage)
- Pirate Galleon
- Pirates of the Caribbean

=== Former attractions ===
- Indiana Jones and the Temple of Peril: Backwards! (Indiana Jones and the Temple of Peril: Backwards!)

== Frontierland ==
- Big Thunder Mountain
- Disneyland Railroad – Frontierland Depot
- Frontierland Playground
- Phantom Manor (Haunted Mansion)
- Rustler Roundup Shootin' Gallery
- Thunder Mesa Riverboat Landing

=== Former attractions ===
- Cottonwood Creek Ranch
- Woody's Roundup Village
- Frozen Celebration
- Pocahontas Indian Village
- Indian Canoes
- River Rogue Keelboats

== Fantasyland ==
- Alice's Curious Labyrinth
- Blanche-Neige et les Sept Nains (Snow White and the Seven Dwarfs)
- Casey Jr. – Le Petit Train du Cirque (Casey Jr. Circus Train)
- Disneyland Paris Railroad – Fantasyland Station
- Dumbo the Flying Elephant
- It's a Small World
- La Galerie de la Belle au Bois Dormant (Die Dornröschen-Galerie/Sleeping Beauty Gallery)
- La Tanière du Dragon (The Dragon's Lair)
- Le Carrousel de Lancelot (Lancelot's Carousel)
- Le Château de la Belle au Bois Dormant (Sleeping Beauty Castle)
- Le Pays de Contes de Fées (Storybook Land Canal Boats)
- Les Voyages de Pinocchio (The Voyages of Pinocchio)
- Mad Hatter's Tea Cups
- Meet Mickey Mouse
- Peter Pan's Flight
- Princess Pavilion

=== Former attractions ===
Les Pirouettes du Vieux Moulin

- Les Pirouettes du Vieux Moulin (Old Mill's Pirouettes)
- World Chorus
- Fantasy Festival Stage

== Discoveryland ==
- Autopia
- Buzz Lightyear Laser Blast
- Disneyland Railroad – Discoveryland Station
- Discoveryland Theatre
  - Mickey et son Orchestre PhilharMagique (Mickey's PhilharMagic)
- Les Mystères du Nautilus (The Mysteries of the Nautilus)
- Orbitron
- Star Tours: L'Aventure Continue (Star Tours: The Adventures Continue)
- Star Wars Hyperspace Mountain
- Welcome to Starport: A Star Wars Encounter

=== Former attractions ===
- Circle-Vision Theater
  - Le Visionarium
- Space Mountain
  - De la Terre à la Lune (From the Earth to the Moon) (1995–2005)
  - Space Mountain: Mission 2 (2005–2017)
- Star Tours
- Arcade Beta
- Discoveryland Theatre
  - Captain EO (1992–1998; 2010–2015)
  - Chérie, J'ai Retreci le Public (Honey, I Shrunk the Audience!) (1999–2010)
  - Ant-Man Special Sneak Peek
  - Star Wars: Path of the Jedi
  - Disney and Pixar Shorts Festival

== Entertainment ==
Disneyland Park hosts a range of daytime and nighttime entertainment throughout the year, although the nighttime entertainment is seasonal.

=== Current ===
==== Daytime shows ====
- Disney Stars on Parade – 2017–present
- Rhythms of the Pride Lands – 2019–2020, 2021-present

==== Nighttime shows ====
- Disney Tales Of Magic - 2025 - Present

==== Seasonal ====
- Disney Halloween Festival (Halloween Season)
- Mickey's Halloween Celebration (2013–2016; 2018–current)
- Disney Halloween Party (Halloween Season)
- Disney Enchanted Christmas (Christmas Season)
- Mickey's Dazzling Christmas Parade (2021-current)
- Disney New Year's Eve Party (Christmas Season)
- Disneyland Paris Pride

=== Retired ===
==== Daytime shows ====
- Beauty and the Beast (1992–1996)
- Winnie the Pooh and Friends, too (1998–2005, 2006–2011)
- Mulan, la Légende (1999–2002)
- Mickey's Winter Wonderland (seasonal, 1997–2012)
- Tarzan: The Encounter (2000–2008, 2011–2012)
- Jedi Training Academy (2015–2017)
- Welcome to Spring (Seasonal, Swing into Spring – 2015–2016)
- Chantons La Reine des Neiges – Frozen Sing-Along (2015–2018)
- Mickey Presents Happy Anniversary Disneyland Paris (2017–2018)
- Forest of Enchantment: A Disney Musical Adventure (2016–2017)
- The Starlit Princess Waltz (2018–2019)

==== Central Plaza shows ====
- The Disney Villains Halloween Showtime (Halloween) (2009–2010)
- It's Party Time... with Mickey and Friends (2009–2010)
- Disney's Showtime Spectacular (2010–2011)
- Mickey's Magical Celebration (2011–2012)
- Disney's Maleficious Halloween Party (Halloween) (2011)
- Le Voeu de Noël de la Princesse Aurore (Christmas) (2011–2012)
- Disney's Not-So-Scary Halloween Show (Halloween)
- Mickey and his Magic Halloween Night (Halloween)
- Goofy's Garden Party (Seasonal, Swing into Spring – 2015–2016)
- Disney Pirate or Princess: Make Your Choice (Seasonal – 2018–2019)
- Jungle Book Jive (Festival of the Lion King and Jungle) (2019–2020)
- Dream...and Shine Brighter (2022–2023)
- A Million Splashes of Colour (2024)

==== Nighttime shows ====
- Fantasy in the Sky (1992–2005)
- Wishes (2005–2007)
- The Enchanted Fireworks (2008–2012)
- Disney Dreams! (2012–2017, 2023–2024)
- Disney D-Light (2022–2023)
- Disney Illuminations (2017–2023, 2024–2025)
- Disney Electrical Sky Parade (2024–2025)

==== Train parades ====
- Disney Characters Express (2007–2009)
- Minnie's Party Train (2009–2010)
- Disney All Stars Express (2010–2011)
- Disney Dance Express (2011–2012)
- Disney's 20th Anniversary Celebration Train (2012–2013)

==== Parades ====
- Disney Classics Parade (1992–1997)
- Main Street Electrical Parade (1992–2003)
- The Hunchback Of Notre Dame Carnival (1997–1998)
- The Wonderful World of Disney Parade (1998–1999 and 2001–2007)
- Disney ImagiNations Parade (1999–2001)
- Disney's Fantillusion (2003–2012)
- Once Upon a Dream Parade (2007–2012)
- Disney Magic On Parade (2012–2017)
