= Autopia =

Attraction at Disney theme parks

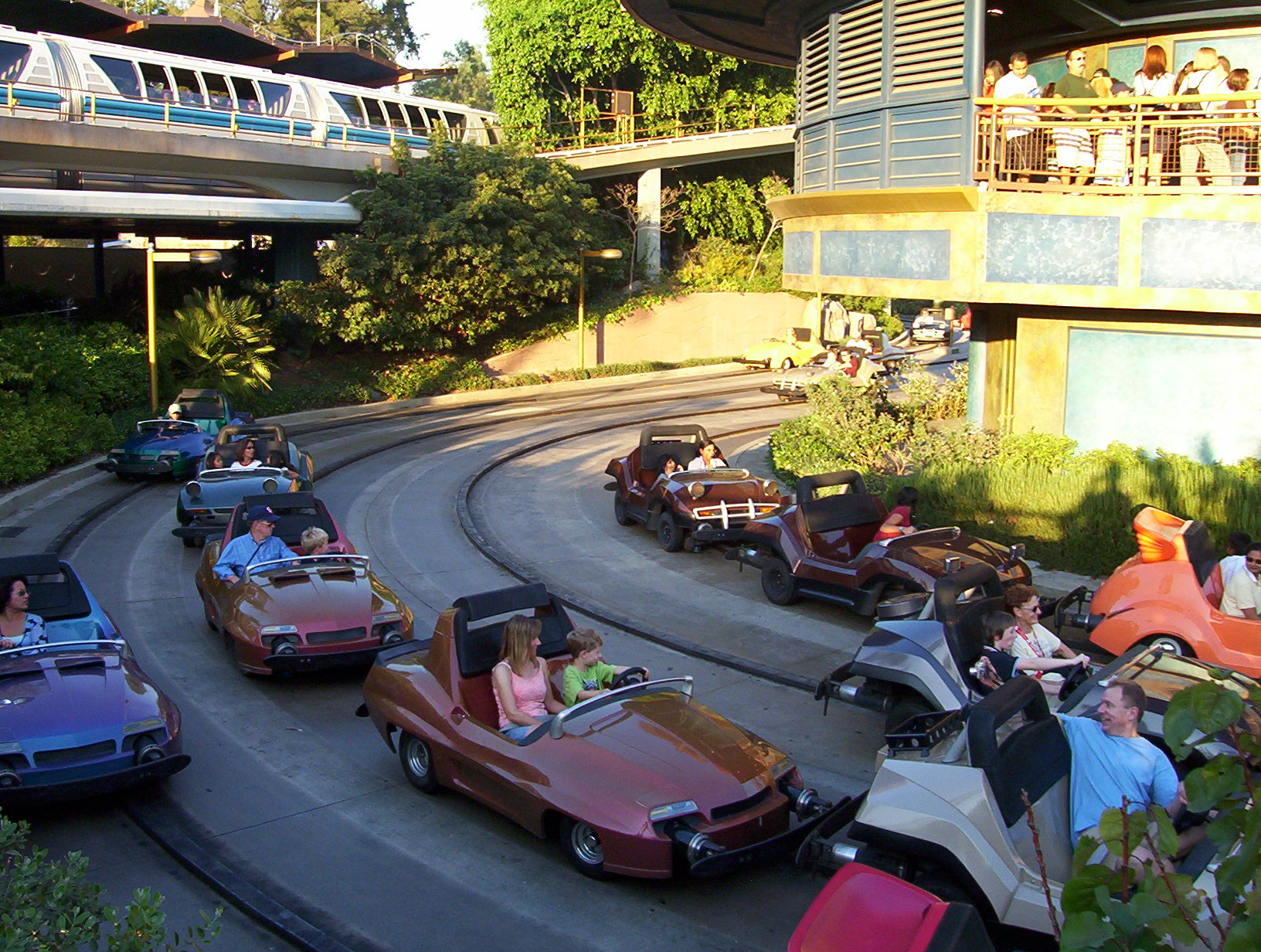
- Disneyland's Autopia

Disneyland
- Area: Tomorrowland
- Coordinates: 33.8125°N 117.9164°W
- Status: Operating
- Opening date: July 17, 1955
- Lightning Lane available

Magic Kingdom
- Name: Tomorrowland Speedway
- Area: Tomorrowland
- Coordinates: 28.4194°N 81.5792°W
- Status: Operating
- Opening date: October 1, 1971
- Lightning Lane available

Tokyo Disneyland
- Name: Grand Circuit Raceway
- Area: Tomorrowland
- Coordinates: 35.6314°N 139.8788°E
- Status: Removed
- Opening date: April 15, 1983
- Closing date: January 11, 2017
- Replaced by: Enchanted Tale of Beauty and the Beast (Fantasyland)

Disneyland Park (Paris)
- Area: Discoveryland
- Coordinates: 48.8729°N 2.7794°E
- Status: Operating
- Opening date: April 12, 1992
- Disney Premier Access available

Hong Kong Disneyland
- Area: Tomorrowland
- Coordinates: 22.3147°N 114.0419°E
- Status: Removed
- Opening date: July 13, 2006
- Closing date: June 11, 2016
- Replaced by: Spiderman/Avengers Tower Attraction

Ride statistics
- Attraction type: Race track
- Manufacturer: Arrow Development
- Designer: Walt Disney Imagineering
- Length: 782 m (2,566 ft)
- Vehicle type: Race cars
- Riders per vehicle: 2
- Duration: 5:10 minutes
- Height restriction: 32 in (81 cm)
- Must transfer from wheelchair

Autopia is a race track attraction at various Disney theme parks, in which patrons steer specially designed cars through an enclosed track. Versions of Autopia exist at Disneyland at Anaheim, California and Disneyland Paris in Marne-la-Vallée, France. There was also an Autopia at Hong Kong Disneyland on Lantau Island, Hong Kong before it closed on June 11, 2016. Other versions of the attraction can be found at the Magic Kingdom as the Tomorrowland Speedway and formerly at Tokyo Disneyland as the Grand Circuit Raceway. A previous generation of Disneyland's Autopia operated for over a decade at the Walt Disney Hometown Museum in Marceline, Missouri; one of the retired cars is now on display.

== Etymology ==
The term autopia is a portmanteau of the words "automobile utopia" and was first coined in the 1920s. The term was later popularized in the 1970s to describe the effect of freeways on urbanization and architecture, particularly by English architecture critic Reyner Banham in his 1971 book Los Angeles: The Architecture of Four Ecologies and in American architect Denise Scott Brown’s 1972 book Learning from Las Vegas.

== Disneyland Autopia ==
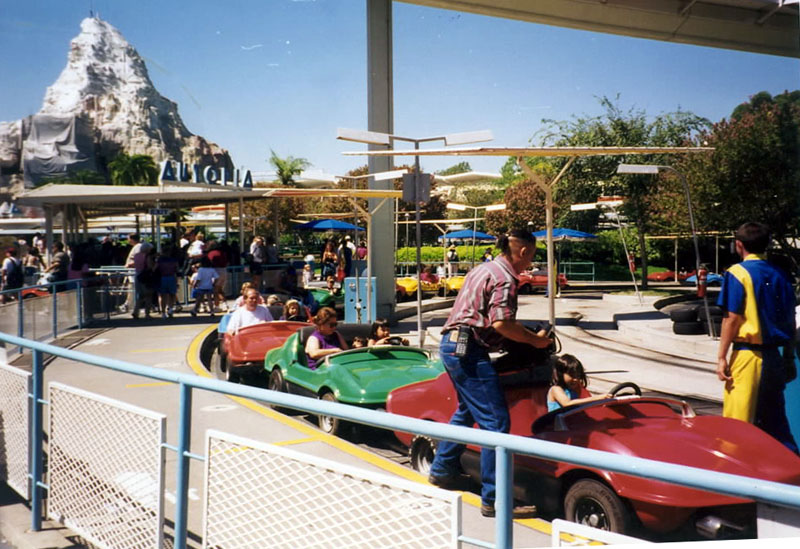
Autopia in 1996, before its complete remodel in 2000. The Autopia cars at this time closely resembled the Corvette Stingray.

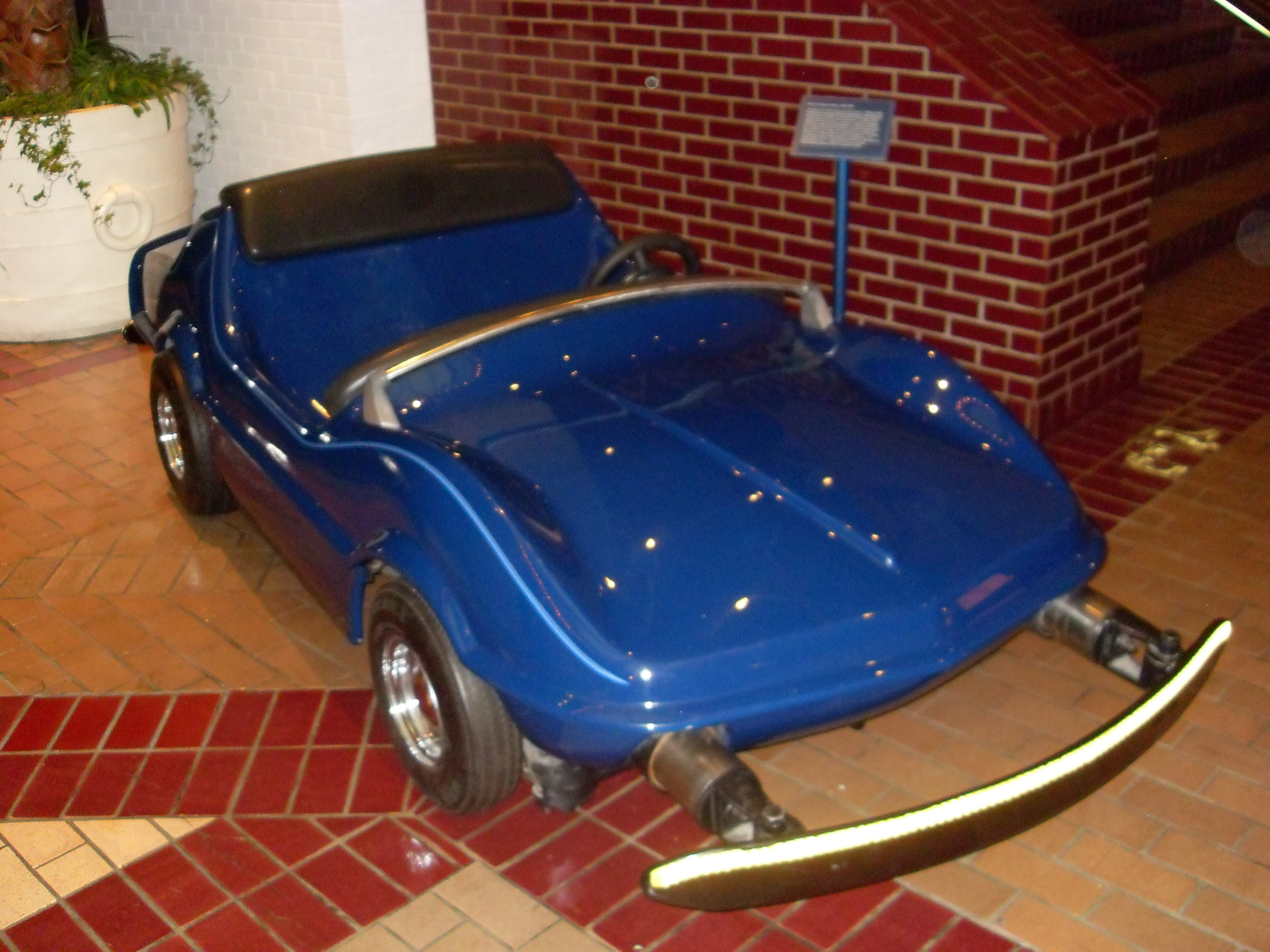
A 1967-era Corvette Stingray-style Autopia car on display in the Disneyland Hotel.

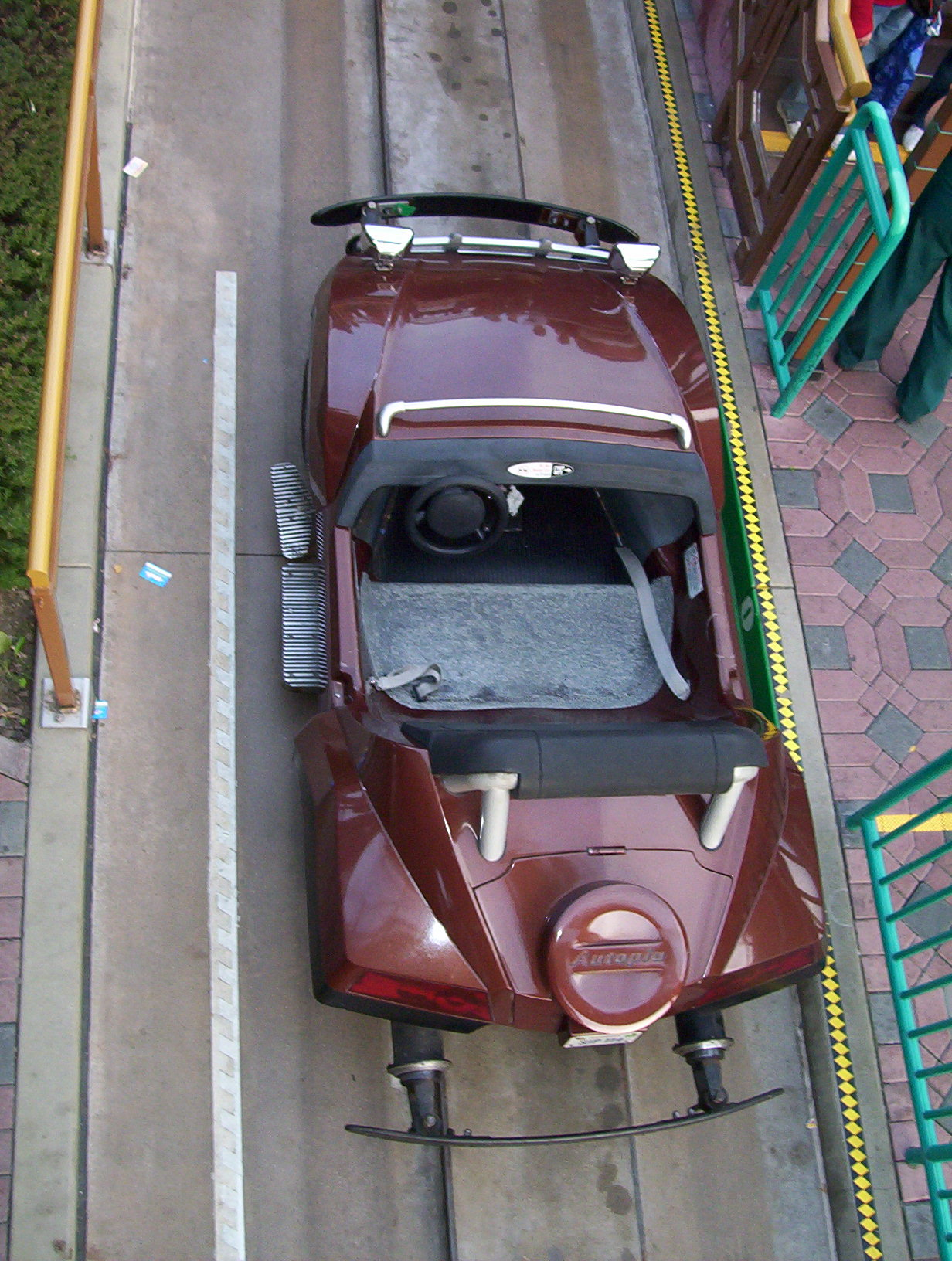
An overhead view, looking down at an Autopia car in 2003.

The Disneyland Autopia, in one form or another, is one of the few current attractions that opened with the park on July 17, 1955. When it opened, it represented the future of what would become America's multilane limited-access highways, which were still being developed. President Eisenhower had yet to sign the Interstate Highway legislation at the time Disneyland opened. Disneyland Autopia’s original sponsor from 1955 until 1970 was Richfield Oil.

Drivers can use the steering wheel along the track but the center rail will guide the cars along the track regardless of steering input. Drivers and children too short to depress the gas pedal are paired with taller individuals who can. Brakes are applied automatically when the driver releases the gas pedal.

=== Autopia cars ===
The original Disneyland Autopia cars were designed by Disney Imagineer Bob Gurr to resemble actual full-sized vehicles rather than a common bumper car. The cars were constructed with fiberglass bodies on a 64-inch wheelbase. They used a Gladden Products Corp. 4-stroke, single-cylinder 318 cc gasoline engine rated at 7.5 bhp at 3400 rpm. The 475-lb cars were limited to a top speed of 11 mph.

Before the park opened, the cars were tested without the bumpers, and were almost completely destroyed by the test drivers. Bumpers were fitted around the vehicle, but there were still problems with collisions. After opening day, many of the 39 cars in service were broken. Eventually the vehicles were fitted with spring-loaded bumpers to discourage collisions, and roadway dividers and guide rails were added.

The first fleet of Autopia cars were dubbed "Mark I". Throughout Disneyland's first few years, Autopia went through a few fleets, as the cars took much abuse. Though basically the same look, they went through Mark I, II, III, and IV by 1958. When the Monorail, Submarine Voyage, and Matterhorn debuted in 1959, so did a new fleet with an all-new look – the "Mark Vs". The next design, Mark VI, came in 1964. It was at this time (1965) the center guide rail was first installed. 1967 brought another new design, the Mark VIIs, which cost $5,000 for each car and looked similar to the new Corvette Stingray. They remained in service through 1999, till a breed of Mark VIIIs hit the Autopia roadway. The cars were manufactured by Intermountain Design, Utah.

Until 2008, the Disneyland Autopia cars were powered by 286 cc (17.5 cu in) two-stroke gasoline motors from Kawasaki. After Honda agreed to sponsor the ride in 2008, cars were re-engined with the 270 cc (16 cu in) Honda iGX270, a four-stroke gasoline engine which was quieter and produced fewer emissions.

In April 2024, it was announced that the cars would be re-powered with fully electric drivetrains by fall 2026. However, in May 2026, it was announced that Autopia's fully electric cars has been delayed to 2027. In 2026, Gurr gave an interview in which he said he had been arguing for years that Disney should move away from gasoline-powered Autopia cars due to the pollution they produced.

=== Autopia tracks ===
The Tomorrowland version was not the only form of Autopia to exist at Disneyland. Other versions, separate from the Tomorrowland version, included the Midget Autopia, Fantasyland Autopia (Rescue Rangers Raceway), and Junior Autopia. Of these, the Tomorrowland Autopia existed the longest.

The Midget Autopia opened in 1957 and was manufactured by Arrow Development. It was the smallest and was the third Autopia track, after the Tomorrowland Autopia (1955) and the Junior Autopia in Fantasyland (1956). It was located next to the Storybook Land Canal Boats and the Motor Boat Cruise at the very edge of Fantasyland. Adults were not allowed on the ride. It was closed in 1966 and dismantled to make way for It's a Small World.

The ride was then donated to the city of Marceline, Missouri, where it operated in the Walt Disney Municipal Park for 11 years until parts were no longer available for the cars. One of the cars is on display in the museum whereas the concrete track on which the cars ran was ultimately demolished in 2016 to facilitate replacement of the city pool. In 2015, the Walt Disney Hometown Museum made plans to recreate the ride next to the museum in downtown Marceline, launching a Kickstarter campaign to finance the project. The project attracted a fraction of the $500,000 required to reconstruct the vehicles and track.

Unlike all other Autopia attractions, Midget Autopia was one of several of Arrow Development's "off-the-shelf" Arrowflite Tracked Auto Rides built at several amusement parks throughout the country, at least one of which still operates at Idlewild Park in Pennsylvania.

The Fantasyland Autopia began as the Junior Autopia in 1956. Unlike the original Autopia, the Junior Autopia track had a center guard rail. It closed in 1958, and reopened on January 1, 1959, as the expanded Fantasyland Autopia. It was a duplicate version of the Tomorrowland Autopia and featured the same theme of the original until March 1991, when part of the Disney's Afternoon Avenue makeover of Fantasyland, the ride was transformed into the Rescue Rangers Raceway. The theming was kept until the beginning of 1992, when the promotion ended. The ride remained open on an interim basis until September 7, 1999, when both the Tomorrowland and Fantasyland Autopias were closed.

In 2000, Disneyland replaced both existing Autopia tracks with a new, much larger Autopia sponsored by Chevron. The colorful Chevrolet Corvette Stingray-style cars were replaced by three different kinds of cars: Dusty, an off-road style car; Sparky, a sports car; and Suzy, a Volkswagen Beetle-style car. Each was designed to be tied into the Chevron line of animated 'Chevron Cars', and four versions of the Autopia cars were sold as toys during the 2000 summer season at Chevron stations nationwide. The queue featured animated dioramas featuring the Chevron Cars, and the ride's background music is taken directly from the park's former PeopleMover attraction, which had closed five years prior to the new Autopia's opening. The voice of Dusty the Autopia car is voiced by Matthew Howard, who is said to be (as of 2004) the youngest Disney ride announcer. In response to several minor incidents, the ride safety spiel was re-recorded in 2004 in order to remind parents to watch their children. New for the track was a short "off-road" section. Chevron's sponsorship ended in the summer of 2012, though the Chevron Cars still appeared in the attraction's preshow until Honda took over sponsorship, with all overt references to Chevron removed.

On January 11, 2016, the attraction closed for a new building, walkway (now painted blue, white, and silver), sign, vehicle paint schemes, minor vehicle modifications, and sponsor. The attraction reopened on April 29, 2016, with Honda as its new sponsor, replacing Chevron. In early 2017 all remaining Chevron references were all removed from the attraction. On March 24, 2017, Honda revealed ASIMO in the attraction. Asimo is accompanied by Bird and are in various scenes throughout the attraction, most of the scenes replaced the carpark, and various billboards.

== Car attractions in other Disney parks ==
=== Magic Kingdom ===
Attraction logo at the Magic Kingdom

Magic Kingdom's Tomorrowland Speedway

The second Disney theme park to open was Magic Kingdom. An opening day attraction, the Grand Prix Raceway was based on an international car race rather than the futuristic roadways of Autopia. The original sponsor was Goodyear, as it supplied all of the tires on the Mark VII vehicles.

The track length has been the subject of incorrect discussion over the years. Through aerial photography and research, it has been determined that the attraction was never lengthened, but shortened 3 times. On opening day, the track was approximately 3,118 feet. The attraction saw its length greatly reduced for the first time in 1974 for the construction of Space Mountain, with the two southern curves being shortened and the entire north portion of the track being reduced, thus shortening the ride to ~2,760 feet. An even larger section was removed to make room for Mickey's Toontown Fair sometime between late 1987 and early 1988, this time the track was reduced to ~2,191 feet. In 2012 the final curve was again shortened to make way for Dumbo the Flying Elephant diminishing the ride to ~2,119 feet. In the end, the current attraction has lost over 32% of its original length.

In 1994, the Grand Prix theme and name was dropped in favor of Tomorrowland Indy Speedway, but the track and vehicles remained the same, as new theming to coincide with the "New Tomorrowland" overlay was installed. However, The Walt Disney World Explorer application—both the original edition released in 1996 and the Second Edition released in 1998—used the original name for the attraction's slideshow topic in the application.

On December 20, 1999, Walt Disney Company and the Indianapolis Motor Speedway partnered to change the theme of the track. The ride was changed to add items from the famous Speedway, such as the famous Yard of Bricks, the Scoring Pylon, Gasoline Alley and the wheel and wing logo. The loading area featured panels with the three Indy events: the Indianapolis 500, the Brickyard 400 and the United States Grand Prix.

The name was changed in 2008 to Tomorrowland Speedway, resulting in the drop of the Indy portion of the title.

In 2019, the ride underwent more track adjustments to accommodate the addition of TRON Lightcycle / Run. The attraction reopened on May 18, 2019.

=== Tokyo Disneyland ===
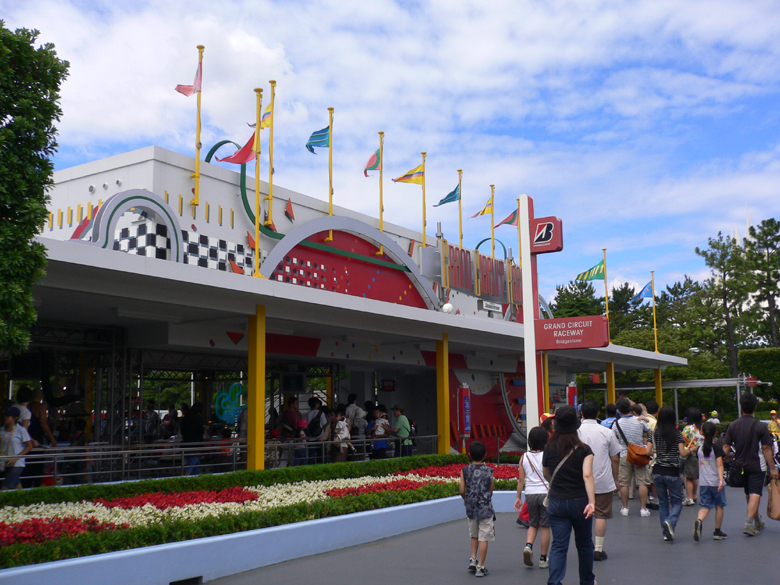
Tokyo Disneyland's Grand Circuit Raceway

At Tokyo Disneyland, the ride was known as Grand Circuit Raceway. This version of the ride opened with the park in 1983 and remained largely unchanged. The ride was sponsored by Bridgestone and featured a grandstand for visitors to watch the "races" between drivers. The track was described as a "figure eight" shape, but was actually quite longer. A new ride, Aquatopia, opened at neighboring park Tokyo DisneySea in 2001, but other than the name similarity to the Disneyland car ride (it is a homage) Aquatopia is closer (as an attraction) to Disneyland's former Motor Boat Cruise. Tokyo Disneyland's version closed on January 11, 2017, to make way for a Beauty and the Beast themed area.

=== Disneyland Paris ===
In Disneyland Park in Paris, the attraction, which opened with Euro Disneyland on April 12, 1992, uses the original Disneyland name of Autopia, but has a unique sense of style and theming. The cars are more rounded to go with a 1920s retro-futuristic theme.

This is also the only Autopia style attraction to have a storyline. The story was that the guests drove their cars, called "Astrocoupes", around a nearby city to Discoveryland, "Solaria".

In 2012, the "Solaria" prop was removed from the attraction and all Discoveryland logos were removed from the fleet of cars. The original storyline was also removed, turning it into a simple driving track, just like its American and Asian counterparts.

=== Hong Kong Disneyland ===
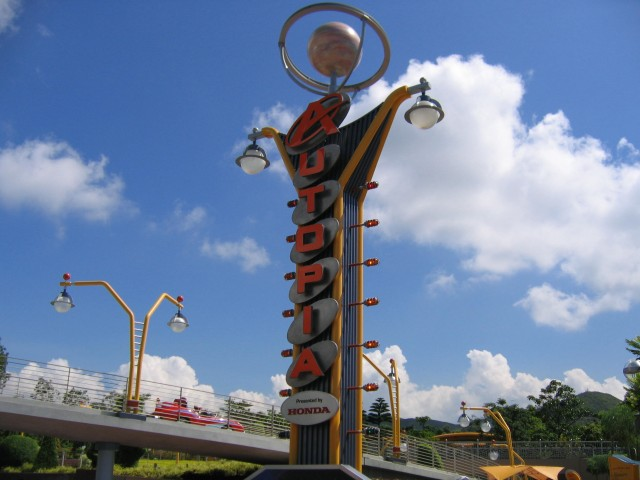
Hong Kong Disneyland's Autopia

Hong Kong Disneyland was the first Disneyland-style park to not open with a form of the Autopia attraction. Later opened in summer 2006 as part of its phase one expansion, the Hong Kong version was different from the other versions as it featured electric cars with lighting effects and an onboard audio system. Theming included a lush jungle and alien landscapes. Honda was the sponsor of the attraction. Hong Kong Disneyland's Autopia closed on June 11, 2016, which was originally set to be replaced by "Avengers Quinjet Experience". But, at D23 2024 on August 10, it was announced that "Avengers Quinjet Experience" has been cancelled to make way for a new unnamed Spider-Man attraction, a part of "Stark Expo". In January 2026, the Walt Disney World News Today stated the new project would be expanded into a Spiderman/Avengers themed tower structure.

== See also ==
- List of Disneyland attractions
- List of Magic Kingdom attractions
- List of Disneyland Park (Paris) attractions
