= Casey Jr. Splash 'n' Soak Station =

Water play area at Walt Disney World

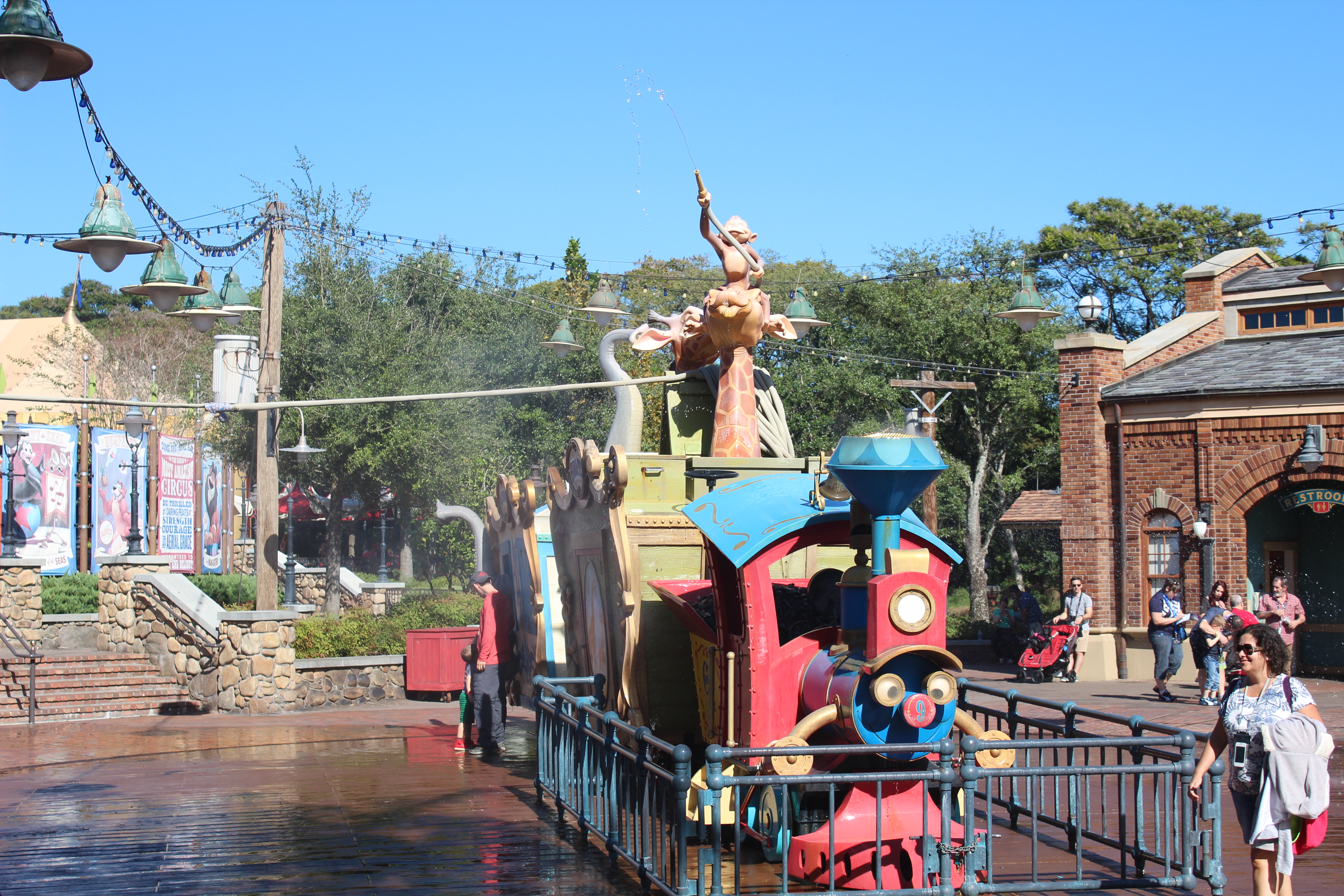

Magic Kingdom
- Area: Fantasyland (Storybook Circus)
- Status: Operating
- Soft opening date: June 22, 2012
- Opening date: December 6, 2012; 13 years ago
- Replaced: Donald's Boat (Mickey's Toontown Fair)

Ride statistics
- Attraction type: Water play area
- Theme: Dumbo
- Wheelchair accessible

The Casey Jr. Splash 'n' Soak Station is an attraction in the Fantasyland section of Walt Disney World in Bay Lake, Florida.

== Attraction ==
Casey Jr is the train seen in the film Dumbo, where Dumbo, his mother, Mrs. Jumbo, and other animals travel on to the shows. This attraction is a water play area across from Dumbo the Flying Elephant and The Barnstormer. It is designed to look like it has actual circus animals in the train by having monkeys, elephants and camels that spray out water at young guests.

== Status ==
Over the years, the water attraction began to have its paint peeling off and some of the water effects stop functioning. As a result, the attraction was temporarily closed on February 11, 2019, for some cleaning, repainting, and refurbishment.

== See also ==
- Casey Jr. Circus Train
