= Castle of Magical Dreams =

Castle at Hong Kong Disneyland

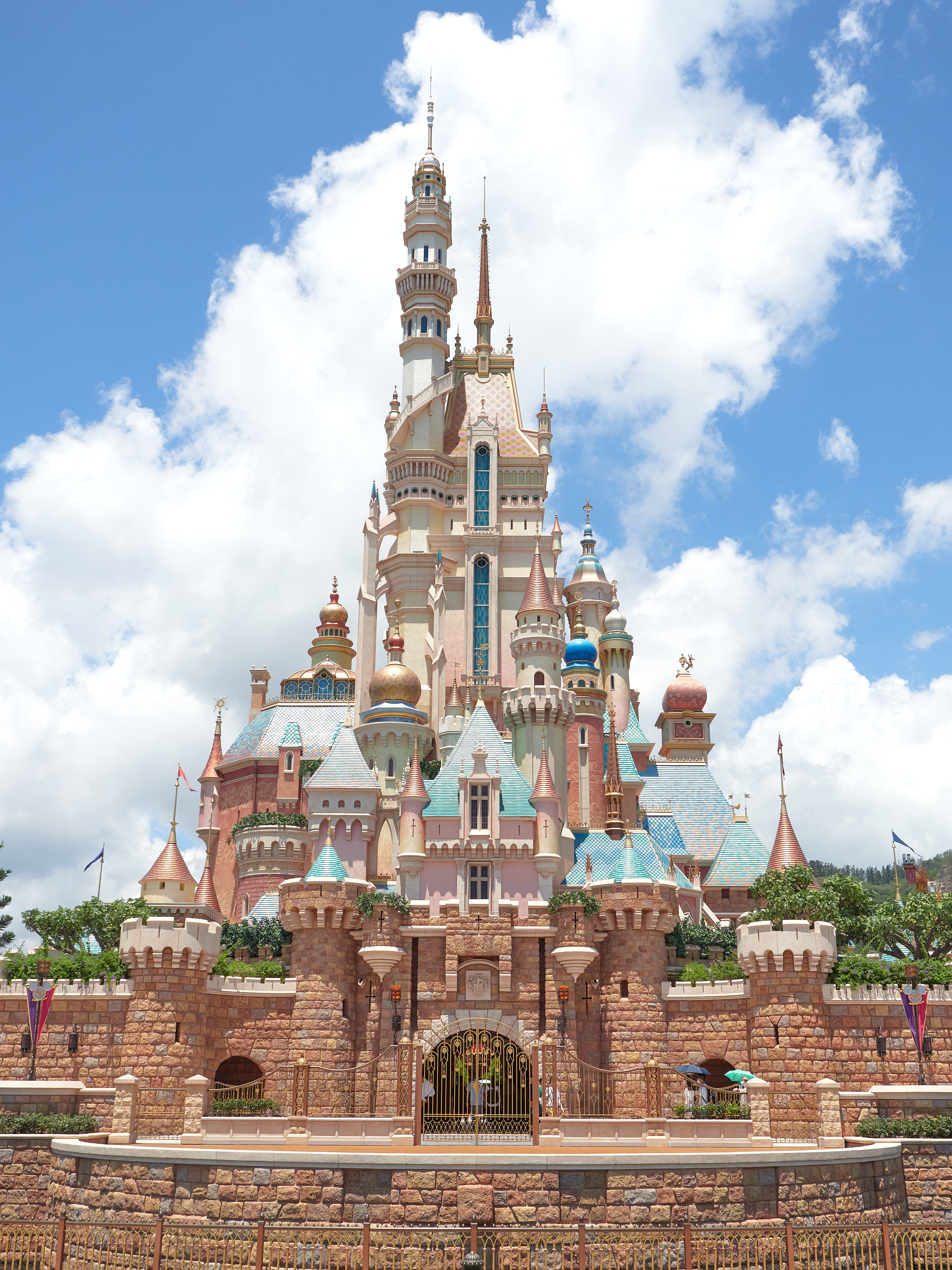
- Castle of Magical Dreams in May 2021

Hong Kong Disneyland
- Name: Castle of Magical Dreams 奇妙夢想城堡
- Area: Fantasyland
- Coordinates: 22.31262°N 114.04113°E
- Status: Operating
- Opening date: 21 November 2020
- Replaced: Sleeping Beauty Castle

Ride statistics
- Attraction type: Walkthrough
- Designer: Walt Disney Imagineering
- Theme: Disney Princess/Frozen
- Height: 51 m (167 ft)

Castle of Magical Dreams
- Traditional Chinese: 奇妙夢想城堡
- Simplified Chinese: 奇妙梦想城堡
Transcriptions
Standard Mandarin
- Hanyu Pinyin: Qímiào Mèngxiǎng Chéngbǎo
Yue: Cantonese
- Jyutping: kei4 miu6 mung6 soeng2 sing4 bou2

Castle of Magical Dreams is the centerpiece castle at Hong Kong Disneyland. It replaced the park's previous centerpiece, Sleeping Beauty Castle, as part of the park's 15th anniversary celebration. The castle's design pays tribute to the 12 Disney Princesses and 2 Frozen queens: Snow White, Cinderella, Aurora, Ariel, Belle, Jasmine, Pocahontas, Mulan, Tiana, Rapunzel, Merida, Anna, Elsa, and Moana. It is the third attraction to open as part of the park's multi-year expansion from 2018 to 2023.

The castle features a jewelry shop — Enchanted Treasures and a meet-and-greet attraction — The Royal Reception Hall. The castle forecourt features a show stage and viewing area for the new daytime and nighttime spectacular, Follow Your Dreams and Momentous. The castle area consists of the castle itself, the Bibbidi Bobbidi Boutique in Storybook Shoppe and the Snow White Grotto.

== History ==
On 22 November 2016, The Walt Disney Company and the Hong Kong government announced plans for a multiyear, HK$10.9 billion expansion of Hong Kong Disneyland. The proposed expansion includes a reimagined castle, World of Frozen, Stark Expo, multiple new attractions and live entertainment.

Hong Kong Disneyland Resort and Walt Disney Imagineering Asia revealed creative design concepts and details of the upcoming castle transformation on 8 December 2017. The construction began after the last show of Disney in the Stars fireworks spectacular on 1 January 2018. The construction also took place in park operating hours and guests were invited to be part of the transformation in a campaign called "#CreateADisneyCastle". Throughout the transformation, the Central Plaza displayed the scenes of 13 Disney princess stories with lyrics of the stories' classic songs. On 1 July 2019, another Bibbidi Bobbidi Boutique in the resort opened in Storybook Shoppe as part of the new castle project. The name of the newly imagined castle was unveiled in D23 Expo 2019, the Castle of Magical Dreams.

Although the castle was slated to officially open in late 2020, park guests were able begin experiencing previews of the castle through special hotel and ticket packages starting on 25 September 2020, after the second closure of the park due to COVID-19 pandemic. On 20 November 2020, former managing director of Hong Kong Disneyland Resort Stephanie Young officially announced the opening of Castle of Magical Dreams in a celebration moment with Disney Princesses and heroines and representatives of local non-profit organizations.

=== During 15th anniversary ===
As part of the park's 15th anniversary celebration, the opening of Castle of Magical Dreams came along with a behind-the-scenes exhibition and an audio tour in introducing the creative process from conceptual sketches, innovative building techniques to story integration.

=== During 20th anniversary ===
As part of the park's 20th anniversary celebration, If the Castle of Magical Dreams was expanded, it could potentially include new themed areas representing different Disney princesses, more intricate towers and spires, a larger courtyard for shows and parades, additional interactive elements, and potentially even new ride experiences all tied to the various Disney stories the castle pays homage to, with a focus on diversity and inclusivity across the different princess narratives; essentially creating a more immersive "world of dreams" experience for guests.

== See also ==
- Sleeping Beauty Castle
- Cinderella Castle
- Le Château de la Belle au Bois Dormant
- Enchanted Storybook Castle
