= Snow White Grotto =

Disney attraction

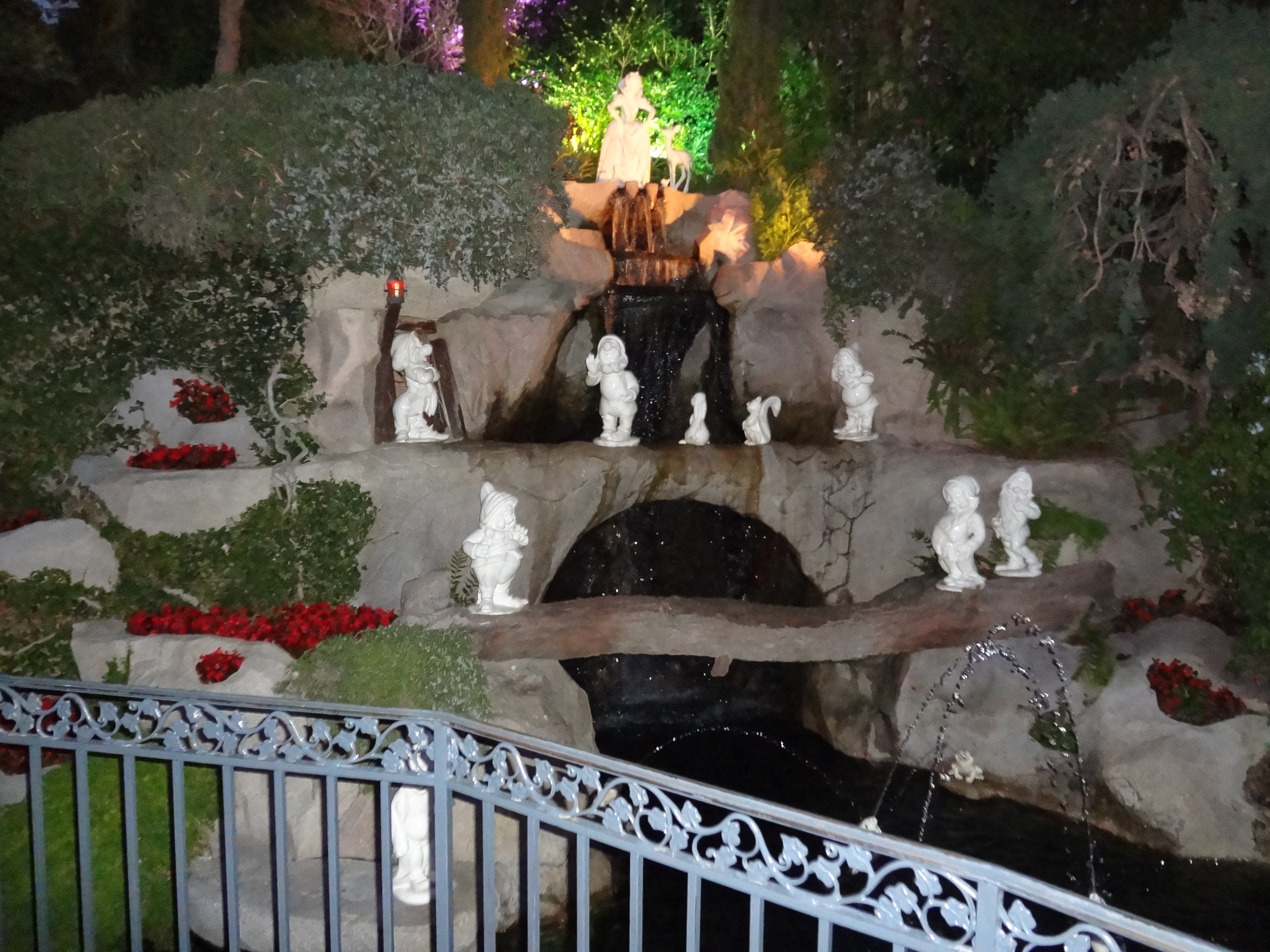
- Snow White Grotto in Disneyland

Disneyland
- Area: Fantasyland
- Status: Operating
- Opening date: April 9, 1961

Tokyo Disneyland
- Area: Fantasyland
- Status: Operating
- Opening date: April 15, 1983

Hong Kong Disneyland
- Area: Fantasyland
- Status: Operating
- Opening date: September 12, 2005

Ride statistics
- Attraction type: Wishing well
- Theme: Snow White and the Seven Dwarfs
- Music: I'm Wishing/One Song from Snow White and the Seven Dwarfs
- Wheelchair accessible

Snow White Grotto is an attraction at Disneyland in Anaheim, California, which originally opened on April 9, 1961, Tokyo Disneyland at the Tokyo Disney Resort in Japan in 1983, and at Hong Kong Disneyland in Hong Kong in 2005. It is a wishing well located at the east of Sleeping Beauty Castle for Disneyland and west of Castle of Magical Dreams for Hong Kong Disneyland and Cinderella Castle for Tokyo Disneyland. Guests can throw a coin and make a wish in front of the grotto.

When Tokyo Disneyland was under construction, the error in which Snow White was taller than the dwarfs was corrected. However, it was later decided to replicate the Disneyland version in which Snow White is the same height as the dwarfs.

== Overview ==
Snow White Grotto is located on the east side of the Sleeping Beauty Castle, Cinderella Castle and Castle of Magical Dreams. The grotto includes statues of Snow White, the seven dwarfs, and a few woodland creatures. Snow White is standing at the top of a cascading waterfall. There is a bridge and a walkway in front of the waterfall as well as a wishing well, the proceeds of which go to local children's charities. The statues were donated anonymously and Walt Disney was determined to incorporate them into the park. The only problem was that whoever made the statues made Snow White the same size as the dwarves, which she is not. Walt Disney Imagineer John Hench used the optical trick of forced perspective to make the statues work. He put Snow White at the top of the waterfall with a Disney-made small deer and put the dwarfs close to ground-level, making Snow White to appear further away, and thus smaller. One rumor as to the origin of the statues is that they were "a gift from an Italian sculptor that had never seen the film, but owned a set of soaps in the form of the princess and the dwarfs. Unfortunately, Snow White was the same size as the dwarfs in the soap set, so the sculptor made her that way." The song "I'm Wishing" was also re-recorded and added to the grotto inside the wishing well in 1991 by Adriana Caselotti, who was the original voice of Snow White from the 1937 film.
