= Enchanted Tale of Beauty and the Beast =

Trackless dark ride at Tokyo Disneyland

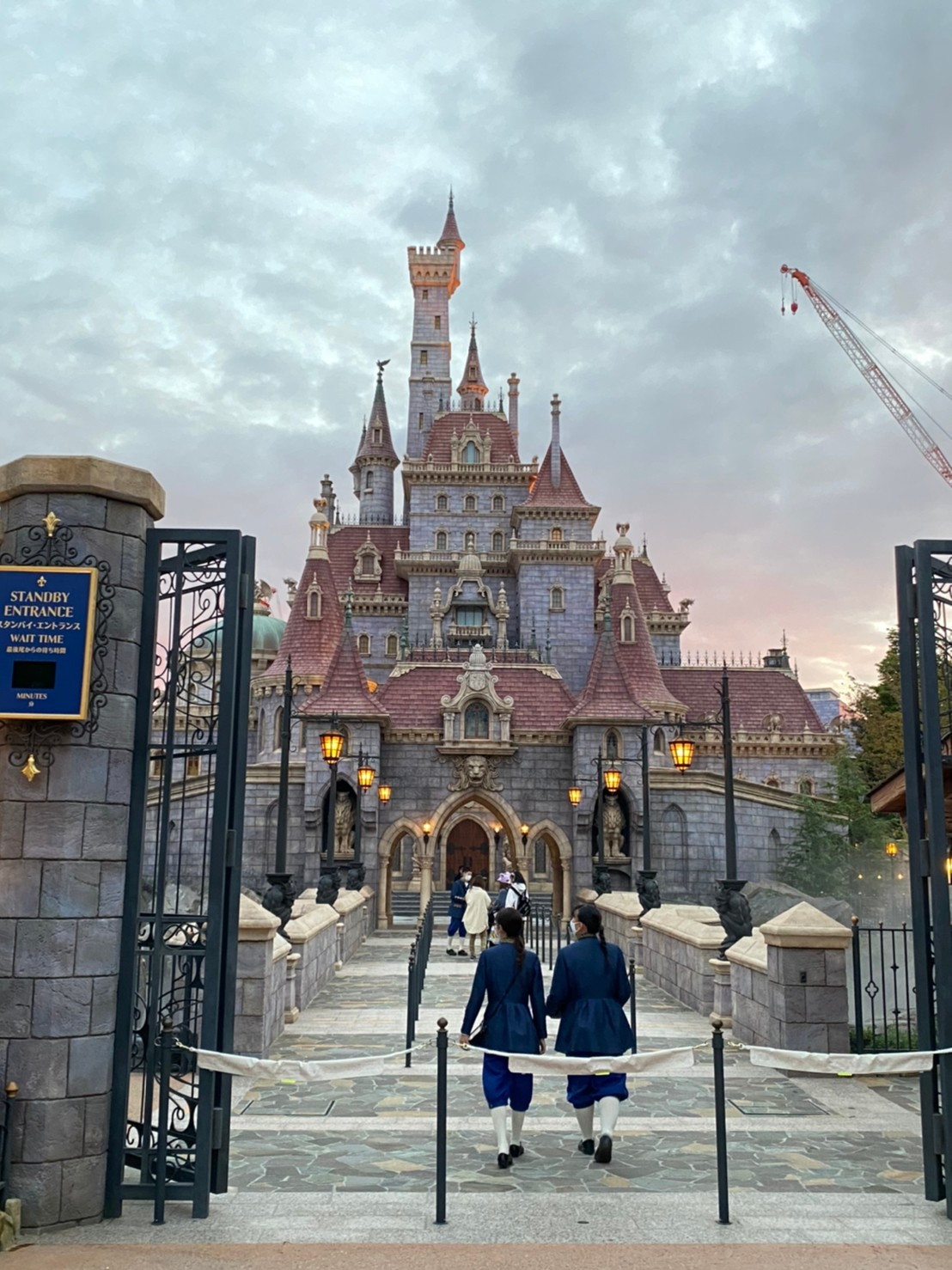

Tokyo Disneyland
- Area: Fantasyland
- Status: Operating
- Soft opening date: September 21, 2020
- Opening date: September 28, 2020
- Replaced: Grand Circuit Raceway (Tomorrowland)
- Disney Premier Access available

Ride statistics
- Attraction type: Trackless vehicles
- Designer: Walt Disney Imagineering
- Theme: Beauty and the Beast
- Music: Alan Menken (music), Howard Ashman (lyrics) & Alan Menken (score)
- Capacity: 1,800 riders per hour
- Duration: 7:50
- Must transfer from wheelchair

Enchanted Tale of Beauty and the Beast (Japanese: 美女と野獣 “魔法のものがたり”) is a trackless dark ride at Tokyo Disneyland based on Disney's Beauty and the Beast (1991). It opened on September 28, 2020. The attraction opened as part of the Tokyo Disneyland Expansion in 2020, the largest expansion in the history of Tokyo Disneyland. The new section adds around 4.7 hectares to the theme park.

== Summary ==
Enchanted Tale of Beauty and the Beast is one of the largest and most technically complex attractions ever created by Walt Disney Imagineering. It is a unique musical attraction that uses trackless ride vehicles which take park guests though the memorable musical numbers from the animated film, allowing them to dance around and through the musical scenes.

== History ==
On October 14, 2016, The Oriental Land Company (OLC) announced they would close the Grand Circuit Raceway and open a "Beauty and the Beast" theme area with a budget of 32 billion yen. The construction started on April 5, 2017. It was scheduled to open Spring 2020, however it got delayed due to COVID-19 pandemic in Japan and opened on September 28, 2020.

== Exterior ==
Enchanted Tale of Beauty and the Beast is one of the most technologically advanced attractions at Tokyo Disney Resort. The Imagineers created a 108-foot-tall castle, with over 100 pieces of architectural ornamentation.

== Technology ==
This attraction is an E-ticket and features 35 electric Audio-Animatronics figures and a trackless ride system that includes both a transport base and an on-board motion base that simulates a wide variety of dance moves. The climax of the attraction uses a Pepper's Ghost illusion that includes projection mapping on an animated figure that moves on the end of an invisible robotic arm through three-dimensional space while spinning 360 degrees.

== Layout ==
=== Pre-Show ===
The pre-show takes place inside a large hall. A stained glass window shows the story of how the Prince became the Beast. After this, Audio-Animatronics figures of Belle and the Beast briefly interact before the Beast roars in loneliness. The doors open and guests enter the loading area.

=== Ride ===
Once guests are seated, the tea cups whisk guests into the dining room where “Be Our Guest” begins to play. As the song progresses, more dinnerware begins to appear on the table, along with dancing plates in the cabinets. Once the sequence finishes, the cabinets close up and guests proceed to the next scene.

The tea cups are now in the Courtyard, where “Something There” is now playing as Belle pets Philippe and the Beast watches. When the guests first enter the room the Beast is holding one bird perched on his right hand. While guests' vehicles dance around the room, it is revealed that he has a bunch of birds in his left hand. The Beast figures laughs and smiles realistically.

Leaving the scene, guests enter a hallway where Belle and the Beast are on a balcony. A curtain behind them closes and a loud knock is heard. From the windows on the opposite side, the mob can be seen attempting to storm the castle. Madame Wardrobe and Fifi are blocking the doors as pitchforks attempt to break through.

Following this, Belle professes her love for the Beast. The Beast rises into the air a spins in circles and then transforms into the Prince. Projections can be seen showing the castle being repaired as the vehicles enter the final scene.

Guests are now in the ballroom, where “Beauty and the Beast” (reprise) is now playing. Lumiere, Cogsworsth, Mrs Potts, Chip, Sultan and Fifi are now human again and Belle and the Prince dance happily. The song concludes as the tea cups exit the ballroom and enter the unloading area.

== Music ==
All the vehicle movement, animation, practical effects, projection and lighting are synchronized to the music. The guests themselves are inside a vehicle that is a part of the show--dancing along with all of the characters. Enchanted Tale of Beauty and the Beast was inspired by the Disney tradition of animating to music. The score by Academy Award-winning composer, Alan Menken has been arranged to become one continuous piece of music that begins when the ride vehicles are first dispatched and ends just as the vehicles park.

== Critical response ==
Due to the COVID-19 pandemic in Japan the attraction opened without the usual publicity as travel was severely limited. Despite this, the critical response among those who were able to experience the attraction has been strongly positive.
