= Alice's Curious Labyrinth =

Attraction at Disneyland Paris

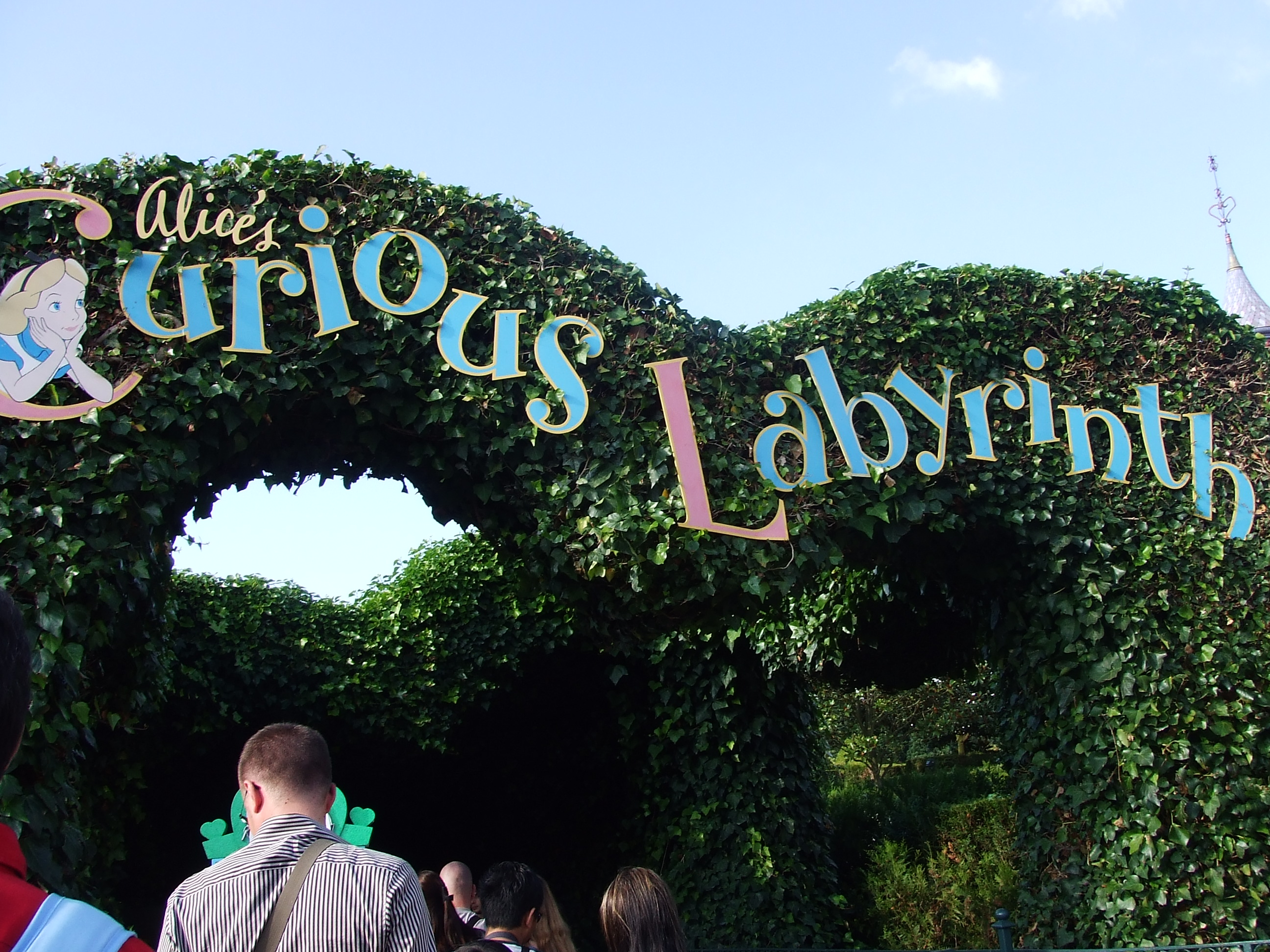
- Entrance to the maze in Paris

Disneyland Park (Paris)
- Area: Fantasyland
- Status: Operating
- Opening date: April 12, 1992

Shanghai Disneyland Park
- Name: Alice in Wonderland Maze
- Area: Fantasyland
- Status: Operating
- Soft opening date: May 13, 2016
- Opening date: June 16, 2016

Ride statistics
- Attraction type: Hedge maze
- Designer: Walt Disney Imagineering
- Theme: Alice in Wonderland
- Wheelchair accessible

Alice's Curious Labyrinth is a hedge maze attraction at the Disneyland Park within Disneyland Paris. It opened in 1992 with the Park, and belongs to the British part of Fantasyland. A similar maze attraction, based on both the 1951 and 2010 Disney film adaptations of Lewis Carroll's Alice in Wonderland, exists at Shanghai Disneyland Park.

== Disneyland Paris ==
=== The Labyrinth ===
The hedge maze is themed around scenes and characters from the Disney 1951 feature Alice in Wonderland. It comprises two sections: the first one with some of Alice's adventures prior to meeting the Queen of Hearts, and the second based on Alice's encounter with the Queen, who had a similar labyrinth in the film.

The goal of the maze is to reach the Queen of Hearts's Castle, where one can obtain an aerial view of the Fantasyland section of the park. One can exit the maze prior to entering the second area, and the maze's route is similar in shape to the body of the Cheshire Cat, with a semi-floral recreation of the character's face adjacent to the attraction.

=== Tulgey Wood ===
The first and easiest part of the Labyrinth focuses on Alice's journey through Wonderland. It starts with guests entering the White Rabbit's Hole, and arriving in a wood featuring strange animals, doors of various sizes (for instance some can only be opened by children), and several signs with conflicting directions. Guests then walk under fountains which spray streams of water over the guest's heads.

Then they discover the Caterpillar's Mushroom Lair, and see the Caterpillar smoking his hookah while it says quotes from the movie. Finally, guests enter the Caucus-Race, led by the Dodo Bird, as they circle him with animals (as the movie presents that scene). The first part of the Labyrinth ends up here with a small "Cheshire Cat Walk" Maze and the scene of card soldiers painting the white roses red.

=== Queen of Hearts's Maze ===
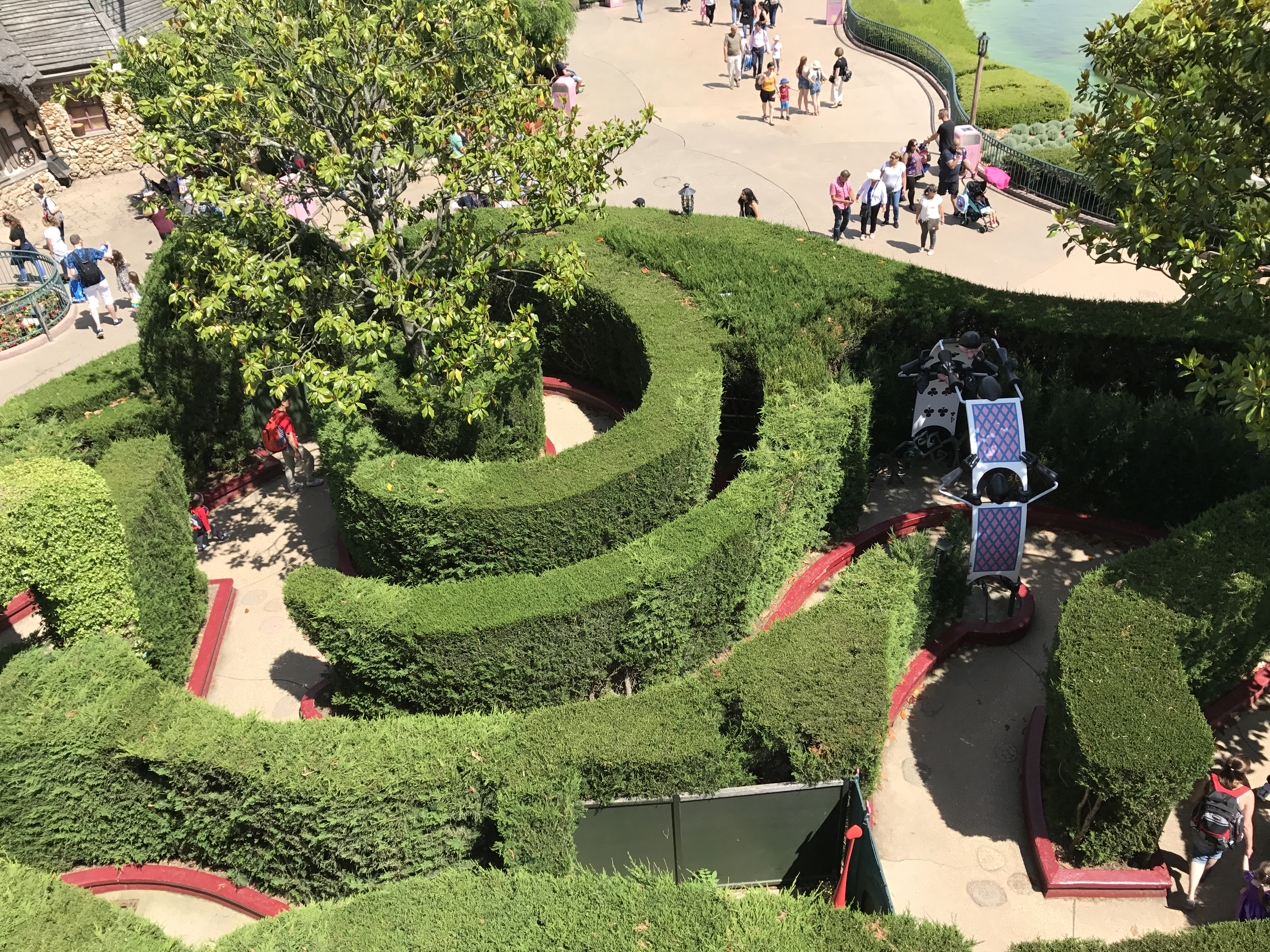
View of the hedge maze

This is the second and tougher part of the Labyrinth. It represents the Queen's Maze as long as Alice's encounter with her. As guests wander through it, the Queen or her card soldiers pop up from time to time, while she screams her famous "Off with their heads!"

The Queen's Castle stands in the center of the maze. Guests reach it in the end, and can therefore go on top of it, where they are given a sight of Fantasyland. A slide used to be featured on the side of the Castle, for children to go down without the stairs, but it was removed due to safety reasons during the park's opening year.

== March Hare Refreshments ==
Close to this maze is a recreation of the Tea Party of the March Hare and the Hatter. Known as March Hare Refreshments, guests can have drinks near the Hare's house. Like in Walt Disney World and in Tokyo Disneyland, the Dormouse can be seen popping his head out of a large teapot and the March Hare, although absent, can be seen on the sign of the doorway. The attraction Mad Hatter's Tea Cups is located close to this house as well. Back in April 1992 when the park opened, March Hare Refreshments sold Unbirthday Cakes (Gâteau de non-anniversaire) for 19,00 FF each.

== In Epic Mickey ==
The video game Epic Mickey features a Wonderland area that bears a resemblance to the Labyrinth, despite some differences. It can be seen in the beginning, and it disappears when there is a hole formed by the thinner while Mickey runs away. The real-world reason that the level didn't appear was that during 2010, the 2010 film was running that year, and game designer Warren Spector did not want gamers who didn't see the 1951 version to get confused.

== See also ==
- Alice in Wonderland (1951 film)
- Alice in Wonderland (2010 film)
