= Fantasyland =

Themed land at Disney theme parks

- Theme: Disney's animated fairy tale films, Fantasy, the towns and villages of Europe

Disneyland
- Status: Operating
- Opened: July 17, 1955

Magic Kingdom
- Status: Operating
- Opened: October 1, 1971

Tokyo Disneyland
- Status: Operating
- Opened: April 15, 1983

Disneyland Park (Paris)
- Status: Operating
- Opened: April 12, 1992

Hong Kong Disneyland
- Status: Operating
- Opened: September 12, 2005

Shanghai Disneyland
- Status: Operating
- Opened: June 16, 2016

Fantasyland is one of the "themed lands" at all of the Disneyland-style parks run by The Walt Disney Company around the world. It is themed after Disney's animated fairy tale feature films. Each Fantasyland has a castle, as well as several gentle rides themed after those Disney animated feature films.

== Disneyland ==
=== History and environs ===
Original dedication

Here is a land of imagination, hopes and dreams. In this timeless land of enchantment, the age of chivalry, magic and make-believe are reborn and fairy tales come true. Fantasyland is dedicated to the young and the young at heart, to those who believe that when you wish upon a star your dreams do come true.

Fantasyland is one of the original themed lands at Disneyland. Fantasyland features Sleeping Beauty Castle at its main entrance, which is also the park's icon, and a central courtyard dominated by King Arthur Carrousel, in front of which sits a sword in an anvil; several times each day a costumed Merlin helps a child pull the sword from it. The entrance also contains a separate walk-through attraction that opened in 1957 but was closed from 2001 to 2008 due to security concerns following the September 11 attacks. The attraction reopened in May 2008.

The famed "Fantasy in the Sky Fireworks" show was introduced in 1956, but Tinker Bell's first flight wasn't until 1961. The first Tinker Bell was Tiny Kline, a former circus aerialist. Multiple shows have replaced this, most involving some sort of 'flying' character, such as Tinker Bell.

In 1983, Fantasyland received a major facelift (dubbed "New Fantasyland") and the attraction façades changed from a Renaissance motif to a fantasy mock up of a Bavarian village, similar to the European setting of many of the fairy tales Walt adapted. During the development of New Fantasyland, Dale Burner served as Disneyland's Fantasyland/Tomorrowland Director. An August 1982 issue of the employee publication Disneyland LINE identified Burner in this role while discussing preparations for the project and changes being made to Fantasyland facilities. The area was expanded to allow for more space between attractions. Existing rides were given small but helpful upgrades; new rides were added; and only a small handful of less popular attractions were removed. To commemorate the opening of New Fantasyland, the drawbridge was lowered on Sleeping Beauty Castle for only the second time ever (the first being the park's opening in 1955).

The plaque in front of the castle marks the spot where the Disneyland Time Capsule is buried. Sealed on the 40th anniversary of the park in 1995, it contains different items from the history of Disney parks, and is scheduled to be opened in the year 2035.

=== Current attractions and entertainment ===
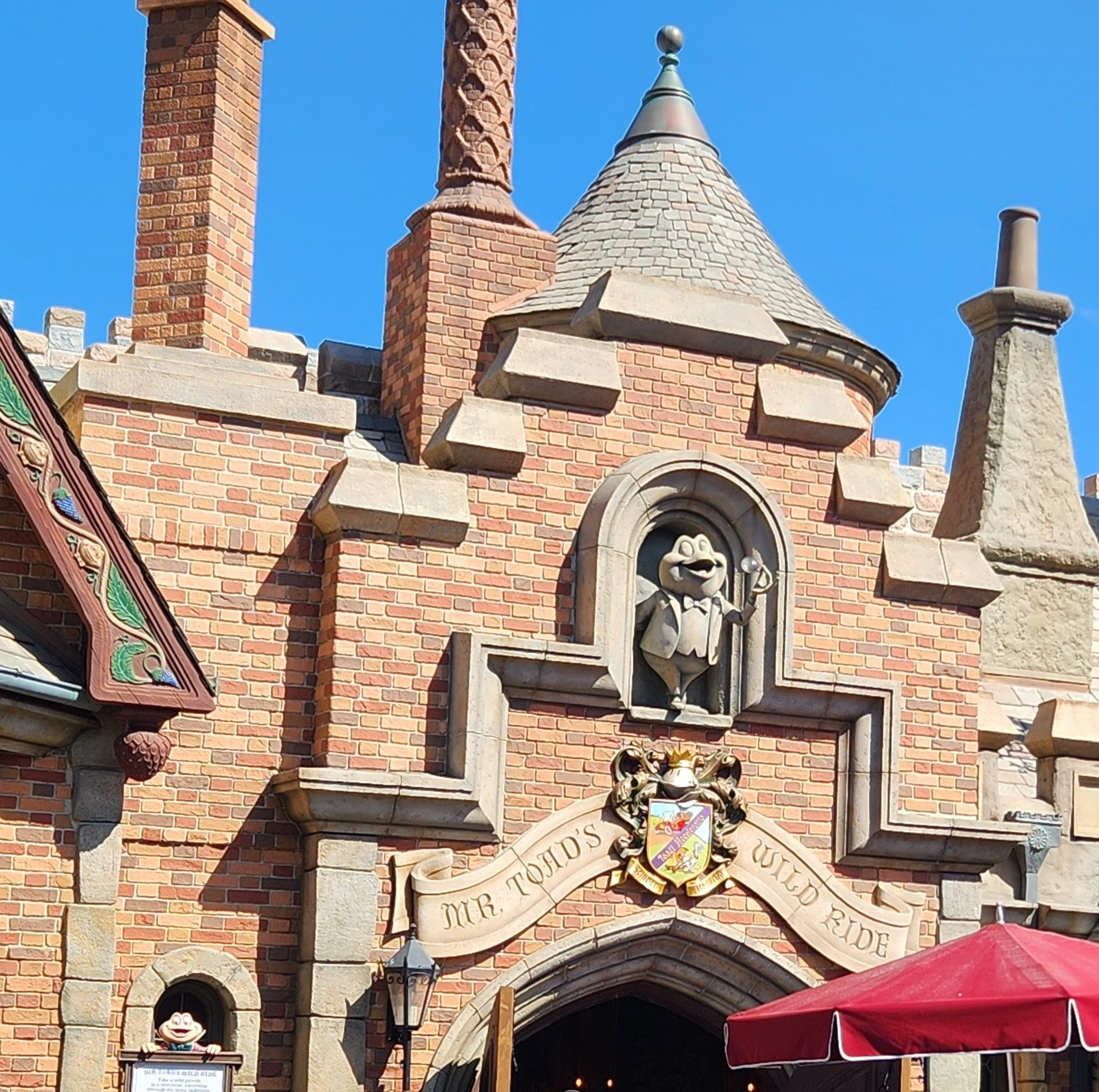
Mr. Toad's Wild Ride

- Alice in Wonderland (1958–present)
- Casey Jr. Circus Train (1955–present)
- Dumbo the Flying Elephant (1955–present)
- It's a Small World (1966–present)
- Fantasy Faire
  - Royal Hall
  - Royal Theatre
- Fantasyland Theatre
  - Holiday Fun with Santa and Friends (2024–2025; seasonal)
  - "Bluey's Best Day Ever!" (2026–present, based on the Australian television series Bluey)
- King Arthur Carrousel (1955–present)
- Mad Tea Party (1955–present)
- Matterhorn Bobsleds (1959–present)
- Mr. Toad's Wild Ride (1955–present)
- Peter Pan's Flight (1955–present)
- Pinocchio's Daring Journey (1983–present)
- Pixie Hollow (2008–present)
- Sleeping Beauty Castle walk-through (1957–2001, 2008–present)
- Snow White Grotto (1961–present)
- Snow White's Enchanted Wish (1955–present)
- Storybook Land Canal Boats (1955–present)

=== Former attractions and entertainment ===
- Snow White and Her Adventures (1955–82)
- Canal Boats of the World (1955)
- Mickey Mouse Club Circus (1955–56)
- Mickey Mouse Club Theater (1955–82, replaced by Pinocchio's Daring Journey)
- Keller's Jungle Killers (1956)
- Skyway to Tomorrowland (1956–94)
- Motor Boat Cruise (1957–93)
- Midget Autopia (1957–66)
- Fantasyland Autopia (1959–99)
- Skull Rock (1960–82)
- Snow White's Scary Adventures (1983–2020)
- Videopolis (1985–2006)
- Fantasyland Depot (1961–93, re-themed as Toon Town Depot)
- Disney Afternoon Avenue, featuring the Disney Afternoon characters (1991):
  - Baloo's Dressing Room
  - Motor Boat Cruise to Gummi Glen
  - Rescue Rangers Raceway
- Ariel's Grotto in Triton's Garden (1996–2008, replaced by Pixie Hollow)
- Fantasyland Theater:
  - "Plane Crazy" Stage Show (1991–2012)
  - Beauty and the Beast Live on Stage (1992–95)
  - The Spirit of Pocahontas (1995–97)
  - Disney's Animazement – The Musical (1998–2001)
  - Minnie's Christmas Party (2001–02)
  - Mickey's Detective School (2002–03)
  - Snow White: An Enchanting Musical (2004–05)
  - Disney Princess Fantasy Faire (2006–12)
  - Mickey and the Magical Map (2013–20)
  - Tale of the Lion King(2022–24)
  - Pixar Pals Playtime Party (2024–25)
- Fantasia Gardens (1993–2006)
- Royal Theatre
  - "Frozen" (2015–16)

=== Current restaurants and refreshments ===
- Edelweiss Snacks
- Maurice's Treats
- Red Rose Taverne
- Troubadour Tavern

=== Former restaurants and refreshments ===
- Character Foods (1955–81)
- Chicken of the Sea Pirate Ship/Captain Hook's Galley (1955–82, replaced by Dumbo the Flying Elephant)
- Welch's Grape Juice Stand (1956–81)
- Yumz (1985–2004)
- Enchanted Cottage Sweets & Treats (2004–2012)
- Village Haus Restaurant (1983–2017)

=== Current shops ===
- Bibbidi Bobbidi Boutique
- The Castle Holiday Shop
- Stromboli's Cart
- Royal Reception
- Fairy Tale Treasures
- "It's a Small World" Toy Shop
- Le Petit Chalet
- The Mad Hatter

=== Former shops ===
- Merlin's Magic Shop (1955–83)
- Tinker Bell Toy Shoppe (1957–2008)
- Castle Candy Kitchen/Shoppe (1958–67)
- Arts & Crafts Shop (1958–82)
- Clock Shop (1963–69)
- Castle Arts (1983–87)
- Mickey's Christmas Chalet (1983–87)
- Geppetto's Arts & Crafts (1983–2007)
- Briar Rose Cottage (1987–91)
- Castle Christmas Shop (1987–96)
- Disney Villains (1991–1996)
- The Castle Heraldry Shoppe (1994–2017)
- Names Unraveled (1995–2005)
- Knight Shop (1997–98)
- Princess Boutique (1997–2005)
- Villains Lair (1998–2004)
- 50th Anniversary Shop (2005–06)
- Three Fairies Magic Crystals (2006–08)

== Magic Kingdom ==
=== Expansion ===
The area went through a large expansion and renovation between 2010 and 2014.

Conceptual artwork for the expansion shows several new additions and changes. Included is the dark ride themed to Disney Animation's 1989 film The Little Mermaid, and an area themed to Disney Animation's 1991 film Beauty and the Beast featuring the Beast's Castle with a new sit-down restaurant and Belle's cottage. Between the two attractions life-sized figures of Bambi and Thumper can be seen playing in the woodland with the Great Prince of the Forest watching them from a distance. There is also a rest area themed to Disney Animation's 2010 film Tangled, and an interactive queue for Peter Pan's Flight.

There were originally plans for an area and attraction based on The Chronicles of Narnia film series as part of the expansion but they were cancelled when Walden Media’s contract with C. S. Lewis' estate expired in 2011.

Mickey's Toontown Fair was closed on February 11, 2011 in order to build the Storybook Circus area of the Fantasyland extension. Some elements of Mickey's Toontown Fair were demolished and others were re-themed to the new area. Storybook Circus is based on elements of the 1941 animated film Dumbo and other characters from the Mickey Mouse universe. The Dumbo the Flying Elephant ride was removed from Fantasyland and rebuilt in Storybook Circus, the new version doubling the capacity of the old ride and introducing an interactive queue. The Barnstormer at Goofy's Wiseacre Farm was renamed The Barnstormer featuring the Great Goofini. Storybook Circus has been completed and became fully open to the public on October 4, 2012. The first stage was completed on March 12, 2012 ("The Barnstormer", the renovated Storybook Circus train station, and the first half of the new Dumbo ride). The second phase of Storybook Circus (the second half of Dumbo, the indoor queue area, and the Casey Jr. Splash 'n' Soak Station) opened in July 2012. The third and final phase (Pete's Silly Sideshow and Big Top Souvenirs) saw the completion of Storybook Circus on October 4, 2012.

Snow White's Scary Adventures closed on May 31, 2012. The original ride was removed and Princess Fairytale Hall, a new Disney Princess "meet and greet" area, opened on September 18, 2013, where the attraction previously existed. An area themed to Disney Animation's 1937 film Snow White and the Seven Dwarfs features the dwarfs' cottage and a new roller coaster ride called the Seven Dwarfs Mine Train. The coaster features a first-of-its-kind ride system with a train of ride vehicles that swing back and forth, responding to the twists and turns of the track. Although not part of the original plans for the new Fantasyland, this attraction took the place of several proposed interactive Disney Princess meet and greets; these have been removed from the updated plans for the expansion. The Seven Dwarfs Mine Train opened on May 28, 2014, completing New Fantasyland.

On May 2, 2024, Magic Kingdom announced a new interactive game attraction, Smellephants on Parade, where guests can find 8 pachyderms throughout Storybook Circus in a search-and-sniff adventure.

=== Current attractions and entertainment ===
Note: ▲ = Genie Plus / Lightning Lane available

==== Attractions ====
===== Castle Courtyard =====
- Mickey's PhilharMagic – located inside the Fantasyland Theatre. ▲
- Princess Fairytale Hall – offers indoor daily character greetings with Disney Princesses. ▲
- Fairytale Garden – currently offering a daily outdoor character greeting with Mirabel Madrigal from Encanto.

===== Enchanted Forest =====
- Enchanted Tales with Belle – an indoor daily interactive character greeting with Belle. ▲
- Ariel's Grotto – an indoor daily character greeting with Ariel. ▲

===== Storybook Circus =====
- Casey Jr. Splash 'n' Soak Station
- Pete's Silly Sideshow – an indoor character greeting space featuring Minnie, Goofy, Donald, and Daisy. Named after Pete from the Mickey Mouse cartoons.
- Smellephants on Parade – a new interactive game where you go around sniffing elephant statues in Storybook Circus.

==== Rides ====
===== Enchanted Forest =====
- The Little Mermaid: Ariel's Undersea Adventure ▲
- Seven Dwarfs Mine Train ▲
- Mad Tea Party ▲
- The Many Adventures of Winnie the Pooh ▲

===== Castle Courtyard =====
- It's a Small World ▲
- Peter Pan's Flight ▲
- Prince Charming Regal Carrousel – named after Cinderella's prince.

===== Storybook Circus =====
- Dumbo the Flying Elephant ▲
- The Barnstormer ▲

==== Merchandise ====
===== Castle Courtyard =====
- Fantasy Faire – the exit gift shop at Mickey's PhiharMagic.
- Sir Mickeys – gift shop themed after the Mickey and the Beanstalk segment from the 1947 Disney film Fun and Fancy Free. Guests can be "pixie-dusted" inside the store.

===== Enchanted Forest =====
- Cottage of the Three Fairies - confectionery shop themed after the fairies’ cottage in the 1959 Disney film Sleeping Beauty.
- Hundred Acre Goods – specializes in Winnie-the-Pooh-themed merchandise.
- Bonjour Village Gifts

===== Storybook Circus =====
- Big Top Souvenirs – a large gift shop that includes an ear-hat embroidery station and a smaller version of the confectionery.

==== Points Of Interest ====
===== Castle Courtyard =====
- Rapunzel's Tower – a themed area and replica of Rapunzel's Tower from the 2010 Disney film Tangled.
- Bibbidi-Bobbidi-Boutique – offers Disney Princess makeovers for children.
- Cinderella Fountain – Cinderella themed fountain located near the castle.
- Cinderella's Wishing Well – Cinderella themed Wishing well located near the castle.

===== Storybook Circus =====
- Walt Disney World Railroad
  - Fantasyland Railroad Station

==== Daytime shows ====
===== Castle Courtyard =====
- Mickey's Magical Friendship Faire

=== Former attractions and entertainment ===
- Fantasyland Theatre
  - Mickey Mouse Revue (1971–83)
  - Magic Journeys (1987–93)
  - Legend of the Lion King (1994–2002)
- 20,000 Leagues Under the Sea: Submarine Voyage (1971–94)
- Mr. Toad's Wild Ride (1971–98)
- Skyway to Tomorrowland (1971–99)
- Snow White's Adventures (1971–94)
- Snow White's Scary Adventures (1994–2012)
- Storytime with Belle (1999–2010)
- Pooh's Playful Spot (2005–10)
- Dream Along with Mickey (2006–16)
- Mickey's Royal Friendship Faire (2016–20)
- Fairytale Garden
  - Merida "Meet and Greet"

=== Current restaurants and refreshments ===
==== Table-Service Restaurants ====
===== Enchanted Forest =====
- Be Our Guest Restaurant – a Beauty and the Beast themed restaurant with character dining. Located inside the Beast's castle.

===== Castle Courtyard =====
- Cinderella's Royal Table – a Cinderella themed restaurant with character dining. Located inside Cinderella's Castle.

==== Quick-Service Food ====
===== Castle Courtyard =====
- Pinocchio's Village Haus – quick service specializing in pizza, with themes from the 1940 Disney film Pinocchio.

===== Enchanted Forest =====
- Cheshire Cafe – named after the Cheshire Cat, a character featured in the 1951 Disney film Alice in Wonderland. Currently sponsored by Minute Maid
- The Friar's Nook – named after the character Friar Tuck from the 1973 Disney film Robin Hood.
- Storybook Treats – an ice cream quick service location.
- Prince Eric's Village Market – named after Prince Eric from the 1989 Disney film The Little Mermaid.
- Maurice's Popcorn Cart – named after Belle's father Maurice from Beauty and the Beast.
- Gaston's Tavern – named after Gaston from Beauty and the Beast.

=== Former restaurants and refreshments ===
- Hook's Tavern
- Troubadour Tavern
- Enchanted Grove (1983–2011, replaced with Cheshire Cafe)
- Round Table (current site of Storybook Treats, 1971–1994)
  - Mrs. Potts' Cupboard (1994–2010)
- Lancer's Inn (current site of Friar's Nook, 1971–1986)
  - Gurgi's Munchings and Crunchings (1986–1993)
  - Lumiere's Kitchen (1993–2006)
  - The Village Frye Shoppe (2006–2009)

== Tokyo Disneyland ==
Tokyo Disneyland has two original attractions among the usual dark rides: Cinderella's Fairy Tale Hall, which features the story of Cinderella in a walk-through style attraction, and Pooh's Hunny Hunt, which uses a trackless ride system. It is also the only version of Fantasyland to still feature the original version of Dumbo the Flying Elephant with only ten flying elephants, while the other versions of the attraction have sixteen elephants.

On April 29, 2015, The Oriental Land Company revealed a major expansion/re-imagining of the area that included the addition of areas based on Beauty and the Beast and Alice in Wonderland. Alice in Wonderland was supposed to be the theme for a new area that would have replaced the current It's a Small World building, which would have been moved next to Space Mountain. However, the plan was cancelled and been replaced by an indoor theater, The Happy Ride with Baymax, a ride based on the 2014 film Big Hero 6 in Tomorrowland, and a meet and greet attraction with Minnie Mouse in Mickey's Toontown. On September 19, 2019, it was announced that the opening date of this area is April 15, 2020. However, due to the COVID-19 pandemic in Japan, this date was moved to September 28, 2020.

=== Current attractions and entertainment ===
- Alice's Tea Party (1986–present)
- Castle Carrousel (1983–present)
- Cinderella Castle (1983–present)
- Cinderella's Fairy Tale Hall (2011–present)
- Court Jesters Quartet
- Dumbo the Flying Elephant (1983–present)
- Enchanted Tale of Beauty and the Beast (2020–present)
- Fantasyland Forest Theatre
  - Mickey's Magical Music World (2021–present)
- Fantasyland Concert Hall
- The Haunted Mansion (1983–present)
  - Haunted Mansion Holiday Nightmare (2004–present)
- It's a Small World (1983–present)
  - It's a Small World with Groot (2025–present)
- Peter Pan's Flight (1983–present)
- Pinocchio's Daring Journey (1983–present)
- Pooh's Hunny Hunt (2000–present)
- Snow White's Enchanted Wish (1983–present)
- Snow White Grotto (1983–present)
- The Sword in the Stone

=== Former attractions and entertainment ===
- Skyway (1983–98)
- Fantasyland Concert Hall
  - Mickey Mouse Revue (1983–2009)
  - Mickey's PhilharMagic (2011–2026)
- Cinderella Castle Mystery Tour (1986–2006)
- Small World Stage (1983–96)
  - The Kids of the Kingdom (1983–88)
  - Let's Be Friends (1988–89)
  - It's a Musical World (1989–93)
  - Mickey Mouse Club (1993–96)
  - Alice's Wonderland Tales (1995)

=== Current restaurants and refreshments ===
- Captain Hook's Galley
- Cleo's
- Magical Market
- Popcorn Wagons
- Queen of Hearts Banquet Hall
- Troubadour Tavern
- Village Pastry
- La Taverne de Gaston
- LeFou's
- Le Petit Popper

=== Former restaurants and refreshments ===
- Small World Restaurant (1983–1998)

=== Current shops ===
- Brave Little Tailor Shoppe
- The Glass Slipper
- Kingdom Treasures
- Pleasure Island Candies
- Pooh Corner
- Stromboli's Wagon
- Village Shoppes
  - Bonjour Gifts
  - La Belle Librairie
  - Little Town Traders

=== Former shops ===
- Baby Mine (1983–2018)
- Fantasy Gifts (closed on February 15, 2018)

== Disneyland Park (Paris) ==
The fourth Fantasyland to open was in France, at Disneyland Park, previously named Euro Disneyland. Themed as a fairy tale village, this land specifically notes the European origins of the source material for many Disney animated films.

A unique attraction of the park was Les Pirouettes du Vieux Moulin, a Ferris wheel added to the rear of The Old Mill building in 1993. The Old Mill, which resembles a Dutch windmill and was inspired by the 1937 Academy Award-winning Disney cartoon of the same name, was a feature of the park when it opened in 1992, and serves drinks and snacks. The ride closed in the early 2000s, but the wheel and its eight bucket-like passenger cars were left in place and were seasonally decorated. It was later reformed, with the buckets removed, the mill's building serving as a snack counter and the queue area as a meet and greet area. Rides and attractions themed to Beauty and the Beast, The Little Mermaid and Winnie the Pooh have been planned for Fantasyland at Disneyland Paris since the park first opened but are yet to be built. The attraction Ratatouille: L'Aventure Totalement Toquée de Rémy (Remy's Ratatouille Adventure) was originally planned for Fantasyland but was built at the neighbouring Walt Disney Studios Park due to a lack of space.

=== Current attractions and entertainment ===
- Alice's Curious Labyrinth (1992–present)
- Blanche-Neige et les Sept Nains (Snow White's Scary Adventures) (1992–present)
- Le Carrousel de Lancelot (Lancelot's Carousel) (1992–present)
- Casey Jr. – Le Petit Train du Cirque (Casey Jr. Circus Train) (1994–present)
- Le Château de la Belle au Bois Dormant (Sleeping Beauty Castle) (1992–present)
- Disneyland Paris Railroad – Fantasyland Station (1992–present)
- Dumbo the Flying Elephant (1992–present)
- La Galerie de la Belle au Bois Dormant (Sleeping Beauty's Castle)
- Le Théâtre du Château (The Castle Stage)
- It's a Small World (1992–present)
- Mad Hatter's Tea Cups (1992–present)
- Meet Mickey Mouse
- Le Pays de Contes de Fées (Storybook Land Canal Boats) (1994–present)
- Peter Pan's Flight (1992–present)
- Princess Pavilion
- La Tanière du Dragon (The Dragon's Lair) (1992–present)
- Les Voyages de Pinocchio (Pinocchio's Fantastic Journey) (1992–present)
- The Sword in the Stone

=== Former attractions and entertainment ===
- Les Pirouettes du Vieux Moulin
- Fantasy Festival Stage:
  - Winnie the Pooh and Friends, too! (1998–2008)
- World Chorus

=== Current restaurants and refreshments ===
- L'Auberge de Cendrillon
- Au Chalet de la Marionnette
- March Hare Refreshments
- The Old Mill
- Pizzeria Bella Notte
- Toad Hall Restaurant

=== Former restaurants and refreshments ===
- Fantasia Gelati

=== Current shops ===
- La Bottega di Geppetto (Gepetto's Shop)
- La Boutique du Château (The Castle Shop)
- La Chaumière des Sept Nains (The Seven Dwarfs' Cottage)
- La Confiserie des Trois Fées (The Three Fairies' Sweet Shop)
- La Ménagerie du Royaume (The Kingdom Menagerie)
- Merlin l'Enchanteur (Merlin the Magician)
- La Petite Maison des Jouets (The Little House of Toys)
- Bo Peep's Farmhouse
- Thumper's Tree
- Sir Mickey's Boutique

== Hong Kong Disneyland ==
Hong Kong Disneyland features the Castle of Magical Dreams and Fantasy Gardens, the meeting point for character greetings.

In August 2014, the second Pixie Hollow decor had moved closer to Adventureland, and the area that up to the Fantasyland Train Station, was surrounded by fences hiding the works that started recently for "Fairy Tale Forest", which opened on December 17, 2015 as part of the park's 10th anniversary celebration presented by Pandora.

On June 29, 2023, the park removed Sword in the Stone due to the construction of a new Walt Disney statue entitled "Dream Makers" which debuted on October 15, 2023, as a part of the 100 Years of Wonder Celebration. The statue immortalizes the moment when Walt Disney, sitting on a bench and watching his daughters on the Merry-Go-Round in Griffith Park, dreamed up the idea for Disneyland.

=== Current attractions and entertainment ===
- Cinderella Carousel (2005–present)
- Dumbo the Flying Elephant (2005–present)
- Fairy Tale Forest (2015–present)
- Fantasy Gardens (2005–present)
- Fantasyland Concert Hall
  - Mickey's PhilharMagic (2005–present)
- Hong Kong Disneyland Railroad – Fantasyland Station (2005–present)
- It's a Small World (2008–present)
- Mad Hatter Tea Cups (2005–present)
- The Many Adventures of Winnie the Pooh (2005–present)
- Snow White Grotto (2005–present)
- The Royal Reception Hall (2020–present)
- Storybook Theater
  - Mickey and the Wondrous Book (2015–present)
- Castle of Magical Dreams (2020–present)

=== Former attractions and entertainment ===
- Storybook Theater
  - The Golden Mickeys (2005–15)
- Sleeping Beauty Castle (2005–18)
- The Sword in the Stone (2005–23)

=== Restaurants and refreshments ===
- Clopin's Festival of Foods
- Popcorn, Cotton Candy, Frozen Lollipops Cart
- Royal Banquet Hall
- Small World Ice Cream
- Soya Chicken Leg, Corn on the Cob, Frozen Lollipops Cart

=== Current shops ===
- Bibbidi Bobbidi Boutique
- Enchanted Treasures
- Merlin's Magic Portraits
- Merlin's Treasures
- Pooh Corner
- Storybook Shoppe

== Shanghai Disneyland ==
Opened on June 16, 2016, Shanghai Disneyland also features a version of Fantasyland. The park's castle, called Enchanted Storybook Castle, represents all Disney Princesses and is the largest of all six Magic Kingdom castles. A brand new unique attraction called Voyage to the Crystal Grotto, a guided boat ride tour through the castle, and around Fantasyland, is also included.

=== Current attractions and entertainment ===
- Alice in Wonderland Maze (2016–present)
- Bai Ling Storytime
- Enchanted Storybook Castle (2016–present)
  - Once Upon a Time Adventure
- Voyage to the Crystal Grotto (2016–present)
- Evergreen Playhouse
  - Frozen: A Sing-Along Celebration (2016–present)
- Hunny Pot Spin
- The Many Adventures of Winnie the Pooh (2016–present)
- Storybook Court
- Peter Pan's Flight (2016–present)
- Seven Dwarfs Mine Train (2016–present)

=== Current restaurants and refreshments ===
- Fairy Godmother's Cupboard
- Merlin's Magic Recipe
- Pinocchio Village Kitchen
- Royal Banquet Hall
- Tangled Tree Tavern
- Troubadour Treats

=== Former restaurants and refreshments ===
- Celebration Cafe (2016–18)

=== Current shops ===
- Be Our Guest Boutique
- Bibbidi Bobbidi Boutique
- Cottage Curios
- Fantasy Faire
- Hundred Acre Goods
- Mickey & Minnie's Mercantile
- Mountainside Treasures
