= Motor Boat Cruise =

Former attraction at Disneyland

Disneyland
- Area: Fantasyland
- Coordinates: 33.813986°N 117.917604°W
- Status: Removed
- Opening date: June 1957 (As Motor Boat Cruise); 1991 (As Motor Boat Cruise to Gummi Glen)
- Closing date: 1991 (As Motor Boat Cruise); January 11, 1993 (As Motor Boat Cruise to Gummi Glen)

Ride statistics
- Attraction type: Motor boat
- Designer: WED Enterprises
- Theme: Disney's Adventures of the Gummi Bears (1991-1993)
- Riders per vehicle: 3 or 4

Motor Boat Cruise was an attraction at Disneyland in Anaheim, California, in which patrons steer motor boats, which were guided through a hidden track similar to the Autopia ride. It operated from June 1957 until January 11, 1993.

== History ==
Motor Boat Cruise opened in 1957 on the border between Fantasyland and Tomorrowland. The waterways of the Motor Boat Cruise shared space with other attractions such as the Viewliner train and bridges for Junior Autopia.

The design of the boats appears very similar to those illustrated in a "Boat Ride Apparatus" patent filed by Edgar A. Morgan and Karl W. Bacon, of Arrow Development. Arrow Development was involved in the design of many attractions at Disneyland between 1953 and 1973.

Major changes took place in 1959 to the three attractions in the area. The Viewliner and its railroad track were gone, and replaced by the elevated beam of the Disneyland Alweg Monorail. The new Fantasyland Autopia and an expanded Tomorrowland Autopia replaced the Junior Autopia. The lagoon which had once been home to the Phantom Boats was turned into the lagoon of the Submarine Voyage. The Motor Boat cruise remained.

In 1991, as part of the Disney Afternoon Avenue event, the Motor Boat Cruise became the Motor Boat Cruise to Gummi Glen. Plywood characters from Adventures of the Gummi Bears made Gummi Berry juice along the waterway.

On January 11, 1993, the Motor Boat Cruise closed permanently, in part due to the negative reactions to the Gummi Bears overlay, as well as its operating budget being needed for Mickey's Toontown. Its loading platform and landscaped grounds are now called Fantasia Gardens.

In 2001, an attraction considered by WDI to be the true successor to the Motor Boat Cruise, Aquatopia, opened at Tokyo DisneySea in Japan.

== Current status ==
In 2007, the former Motor Boat Cruise waterways were drained during construction of the neighboring attraction, Finding Nemo Submarine Voyage. During this time, around 2/3 of Motor Boat Cruise's former waterways were filled in with landscaping, creating more of a space buffer between the freshwater-based submarine lagoon and the 'green system' water of Motor Boat Cruise's area. During this time, the former tracks that lay hidden beneath the green water were covered up or destroyed. In April 2007, a new dam was built, and water filled back into the area known as Fantasia Gardens (the former Motor Boat Cruise loading dock). It is expected that the last portion of surviving track around the dock, will also be destroyed (and filled in) when Disney decides on what to do with the land. The Motor Boat Cruise's old dock was repurposed into a waterside dining area for the neighboring Edelweiss Snacks, and is used as one of many locations to hand out candy during Mickey's Halloween Party.

== In popular culture ==
The Motor Boat Cruise is the subject of a running joke in the Freakazoid! episode "The Cloud", in which various characters lament its closure, as well as those of the Skyway and Adventure Thru Inner Space. When Freakazoid learns that the Motor Boat Cruise has been shut down, he cries out "NOOO!!!! NOT THE BOATS!!!!!".
