= Mad Tea Party =

Attraction at Disney theme parks

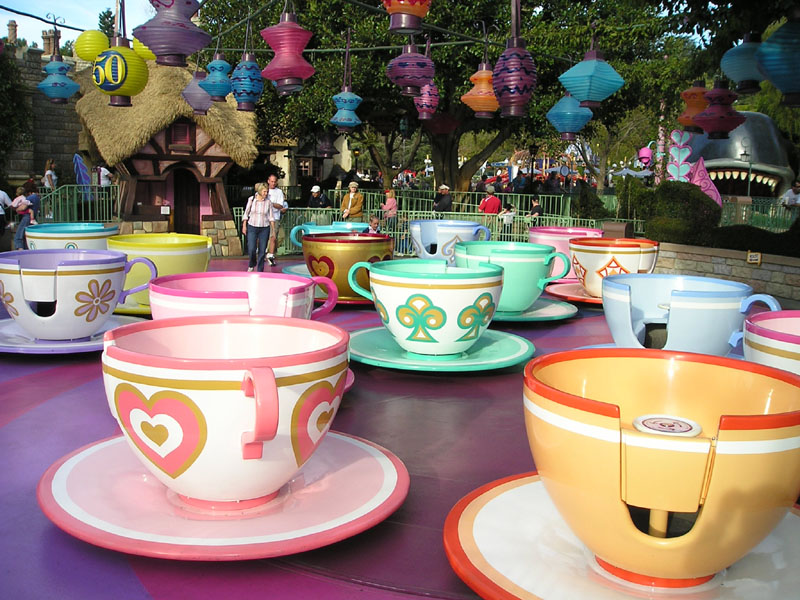
- Mad Tea Party at Disneyland

Disneyland
- Area: Fantasyland
- Coordinates: 33.8135°N 117.9183°W
- Status: Operating
- Opening date: July 17, 1955

Magic Kingdom
- Area: Fantasyland (Enchanted Forest)
- Coordinates: 28.42°N 81.5798°W
- Status: Operating
- Opening date: October 1, 1971
- Lightning Lane available

Tokyo Disneyland
- Name: Alice's Tea Party
- Area: Fantasyland
- Coordinates: 35.6312°N 139.881°E
- Status: Operating
- Opening date: March 8, 1986

Disneyland Park (Paris)
- Name: Mad Hatter's Tea Cups
- Area: Fantasyland
- Coordinates: 48.8744°N 2.7752°E
- Status: Operating
- Opening date: April 12, 1992

Hong Kong Disneyland
- Name: Mad Hatter Tea Cups
- Area: Fantasyland
- Coordinates: 22.3133°N 114.0401°E
- Status: Operating
- Opening date: September 12, 2005

Ride statistics
- Attraction type: Teacups
- Designer: Walt Disney Imagineering
- Theme: Alice in Wonderland
- Height restriction: No restriction for the American attractions
- Manufacturer: Arrow Development (Disneyland)
- Host: Alice
- Must transfer from wheelchair

Mad Tea Party is a spinning tea cup ride at five of the six Disneyland-style theme parks around the world. The ride theme is inspired by the Unbirthday Party scene in Walt Disney's Alice In Wonderland, and plays a carousel version of the film's "Unbirthday Song". It was one of the opening day attractions operating at Disneyland on July 17, 1955.

The attraction is called Mad Tea Party at Disneyland and the Magic Kingdom. It is known as Alice's Tea Party at Tokyo Disneyland, Mad Hatter's Tea Cups at Disneyland Paris, and Mad Hatter Tea Cups at Hong Kong Disneyland.

All five versions of the attraction are located in Fantasyland, and all except the Tokyo version were opening-day attractions at their respective parks. The Disneyland, Disneyland Paris, and Hong Kong Disneyland versions do not have a big teapot in the center of the ride platform. The ride has gained infamy over the years for the number of guests who get motion sickness as a result of the spinning component to the ride.

Like Dumbo the Flying Elephant, Disneyland and its Hong Kong counterpart have a replica of one of the teacups located outside the attraction to be used by guests for better photo opportunities.

== Attraction facts ==
- Ride system: Three small turntables, which rotate clockwise, each holding six teacups, within one large turntable, rotating counter-clockwise
- Theming: The Dormouse can be seen popping his head out of a large teapot in the middle of the large turntable. This occurs only at Magic Kingdom and Tokyo Disneyland, as the other parks do not feature a central teapot; Hong Kong Disneyland and the March Hare Refreshments at Disneyland Paris feature their own teapots apart from the ride.
- Restrictions: The original attraction at Disneyland is unable to run in the rain because once the turntables are saturated with a moderate amount of water, they slip and can no longer spin. The other versions of this attraction at Magic Kingdom, Tokyo Disneyland, Disneyland Paris, and Hong Kong Disneyland are covered to prevent such situations, as well as to protect riders from extreme heat and sun. Unlike its Magic Kingdom, Tokyo Disneyland, and Hong Kong Disneyland counterparts, the Disneyland Paris version has a petal-shaped glass roof.

== History ==
=== Disneyland ===
Several concepts for the Mad Tea Party were originally much more outrageous compared to today's version. One drawing showed the Mad Hatter's dinner table featured in the center of the ride with various lanterns and decorations all around. Another drawing showed 20 teacups circling a central hub, making it similar to a racetrack with banked curves.

For the first few months after the ride first opened, the tea cups spun on a bare platform before it was painted with the psychedelic spiral that exists today. Also, during the ride's first two years, the tea cups had no brakes or clutches; nothing limited how fast they could be spun.

The attraction's original location was directly behind King Arthur Carrousel and Sleeping Beauty Castle. It was given slight modifications in 1972 with ornamental arches connecting the light posts, and again in 1978 with the platform and teacups being repainted. In 1983, the whole attraction was completely remodeled and relocated to its present location near Matterhorn Bobsleds. It also incorporated a few ideas from the original concepts, such as colorful lanterns.

In 2004, the attraction was modified to make it more difficult to spin fast after a disabled rider lost his balance and slipped from a teacup. Like other remaining 1955 attractions, one of Disneyland's teacups was painted gold in honor of the park's 50th anniversary in 2005.

The installation at Disneyland was manufactured by Arrow Development.

In 1956, the ride was paired with a nearby gift shop, called the "Mad Hatter of Fantasyland"; when the Alice in Wonderland attraction was built in 1958, the store was moved closer to both rides, creating an Alice corner. One of the teacups is positioned outside the hat store, for photo opportunities.

=== Magic Kingdom ===
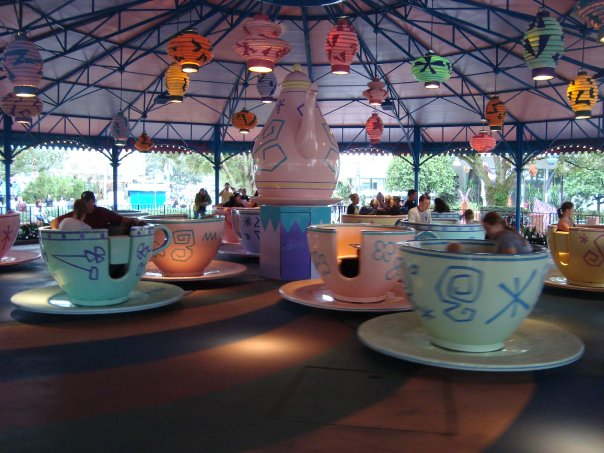
Mad Tea Party at Magic Kingdom

Like Disneyland, Magic Kingdom's original 1971 version of this attraction opened without a roof. It was eventually added in 1973 (along with the central teapot) due to extreme weather conditions. It was updated in 1992 with a new color scheme, new music, and the colorful lanterns. In 2010, the canopy was repainted.

On February 2, 2021, Magic Kingdom reopened after being temporarily closed due to the COVID-19 outbreak's impact on Florida. The ride closed temporarily on February 22 and reopened March 5, in time for Walt Disney World's 50th Anniversary celebration.

=== Tokyo Disneyland ===
Unlike any other version of the attraction, Tokyo's version did not open with the park in 1983, instead opening in 1986. It is mostly the same version as in Florida, with a canopy roof to protect from the often rainy Japanese weather and a teapot in the center from which the Dormouse continuously appears.

Originally, the ride was located close next to the former Skyway station to Tomorrowland, on the edge of Fantasyland. However, in late 1998, as part of Tokyo Disneyland's 15th anniversary, the ride was relocated to the center of Fantasyland near Castle Carrousel, while the Skyway station was closed to make room for Pooh's Hunny Hunt. In the process, the ride was given an overhaul, with more swirly designs on the cups and teapot that resemble those from Disneyland Paris and the addition of colorful Japanese lanterns.

=== Disneyland Paris ===
The Paris version of the attraction is the only version to feature a petal-shaped glass roof and surrounding gardens. It also uses the Dormouse's teapot outside the ride, near the March Hare's Refreshments. The teacup designs were later used for Tokyo Disneyland and Hong Kong Disneyland's teacups.

== See also ==
- List of Disneyland attractions
- List of Magic Kingdom attractions
- List of Tokyo Disneyland attractions
- List of Disneyland Park (Paris) attractions
- List of Hong Kong Disneyland attractions
