= Pinocchio's Daring Journey =

Dark ride at Disney theme parks

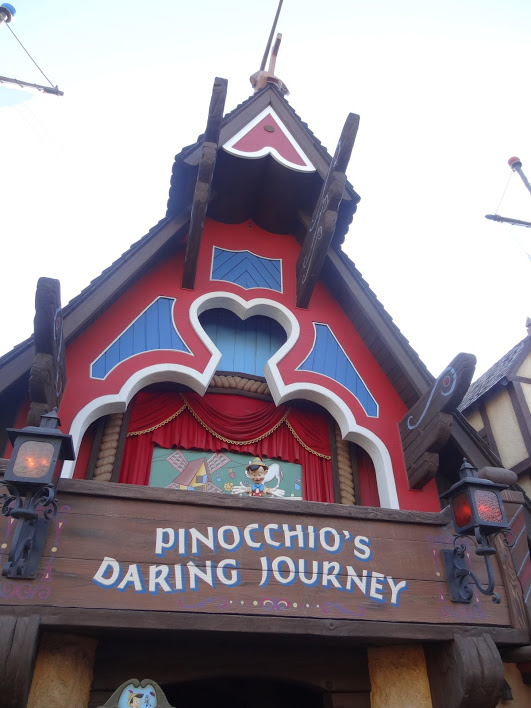

- Poster for Anaheim version

Tokyo Disneyland
- Name: ピノキオの冒険旅行
- Area: Fantasyland
- Coordinates: 35.63106°N 139.8805°E
- Status: Operating
- Opening date: April 15, 1983

Disneyland
- Name: Pinocchio's Daring Journey
- Area: Fantasyland
- Coordinates: 33.8133°N 117.9193°W
- Status: Operating
- Opening date: May 23, 1983
- Replaced by: Mickey Mouse Club Theater

Disneyland Park (Paris)
- Name: Les Voyages de Pinocchio
- Area: Fantasyland
- Coordinates: 48.8735°N 2.7749°E
- Status: Operating
- Opening date: April 12, 1992

Ride statistics
- Attraction type: Dark ride
- Designer: Walt Disney Imagineering
- Theme: Pinocchio
- Duration: 2 minutes
- Must transfer from wheelchair

Pinocchio's Daring Journey is a dark ride at Tokyo Disneyland, Disneyland, and Disneyland Park (Paris). Located in the Fantasyland section of each park, this ride is based on Disney's 1940 animated film version of the classic story, which was the studio's second animated feature film. The attraction tells an abbreviated version of the film, with Pinocchio escaping from Stromboli's puppet show and visiting Pleasure Island, ignoring Jiminy Cricket's advice. Monstro the whale makes an appearance, and Pinocchio is finally reunited with Geppetto and turned into a real boy.

The attraction was built in 1983, as part of Disneyland's "New Fantasyland" expansion.

== History ==
In 1976, Disney Imagineers decided to remove the Mickey Mouse Club Theater in Disneyland and insert a Pinocchio-themed dark ride into the space. It was originally intended for the guests to ride in cars designed to resemble Geppetto's wood-carved toys. However, the idea was put on hold for a while before it was revived for the opening of Tokyo Disneyland in 1983. The attraction came to Disneyland a month and a half later as part of the complete overhaul of Fantasyland.

The Disneyland ride is placed in the Fantasyland courtyard, where the Mickey Mouse Club Theater originally stood. The building is topped with three decorative weathervanes which look like a school of eight fish, a stork with a baby, and a whale. The exterior of the building is based on concept art of Stromboli's theater drawn by Gustaf Tenggren.

The Disneyland version of the ride was the first Disney parks attraction to use holographic material, which appears on a handheld mirror in the scene where the boys turn into donkeys on Pleasure Island. The Pepper's ghost illusion (used extensively in the Haunted Mansion) is used when the Blue Fairy disappears, leaving a pile of fiber-optic fairy dust on the floor.

== Ride experience ==
Guests board the ride vehicle, designed to look like a wooden cart, in a station themed to a street in Pinocchio's village. The vehicles are carved with the faces of Figaro, Cleo and Jiminy Cricket.

The ride travels through Stromboli's puppet theater, featuring Pinocchio dancing and singing with a pair of marionettes, then travels backstage where Pinocchio is being kept prisoner in a birdcage. Stromboli tries to catch the guests in a cage, but Jiminy Cricket warns riders of the trap and leads the car down an alley to safety. The ride then goes to Pleasure Island, which is filled with boys enjoying carnival rides, brawls, candy, junk food and cigars. There are also Honest John and Gideon with a stand along with the statue of a gendarme keeping an eye on the two crooks, and inside a pool hall Lampwick is turning into a donkey. Outside, behind Pleasure Island, the Coachman and his henchmen are caging the other boys who have become donkeys. The Coachman tries to trap the guests in a crate and send them to the salt mines, but Jiminy Cricket leads them past the docks, where Monstro the whale appears, and back to Pinocchio's village. Inside Geppetto's workshop, the Blue Fairy appears and disappears beside Geppetto and Pinocchio, and the ride vehicle travels through Geppetto's workshop, filled with animated clocks, toys and automatons, back to the station.

There's a "Hidden Mickey" in the final scene as the vehicle goes through the workshop; the top of a carved wooden display case holding a ship has a familiar pair of mouse ears.

== Geppetto's shop ==
When the ride was built in 1983, it was paired with a souvenir shop located next to the attraction's exit. Geppetto's Arts & Crafts was a toy shop designed to look like the movie setting, selling wooden marionettes, old-fashioned figurines and cuckoo clocks. Over the years, the shop's merchandise shifted to more conventional plush toys, and in the mid-90s, the store's name was changed to Geppetto's Toys & Gifts. The shop closed in 2004, replaced briefly by a store called Names Unraveled. It reopened in late 2006 as Geppetto's Holiday Workshop, closed in 2007 and then reopened again in spring 2010 as Geppetto's Candy Shoppe.

In fall 2010, the space became a meet and greet for the characters of Tangled, and then became the "Frozen Royal Reception" from 2013 to 2014. The space was occupied by a face-painting service for a few years, and then became the "Royal Reception" shop in 2017, selling Beauty and the Beast merchandise. It now sits vacant.

== Voice cast ==
- Pinocchio - Kevin Brando
- Jiminy Cricket - Eddie Carroll
- Stromboli/Coachman/Carnival Barker 1/Statue 1- Ray Templin
- Geppetto - Tony Pope
- Carnival Barker 2/Statue 2 - Candy Candido
- Additional voices - Will Ryan, Thurl Ravenscroft, Wayne Allwine

== See also ==
- Mr. Toad's Wild Ride
- Peter Pan's Flight
- Snow White's Enchanted Wish
