= Casey Jr. Circus Train =

Attraction at two Disney Parks

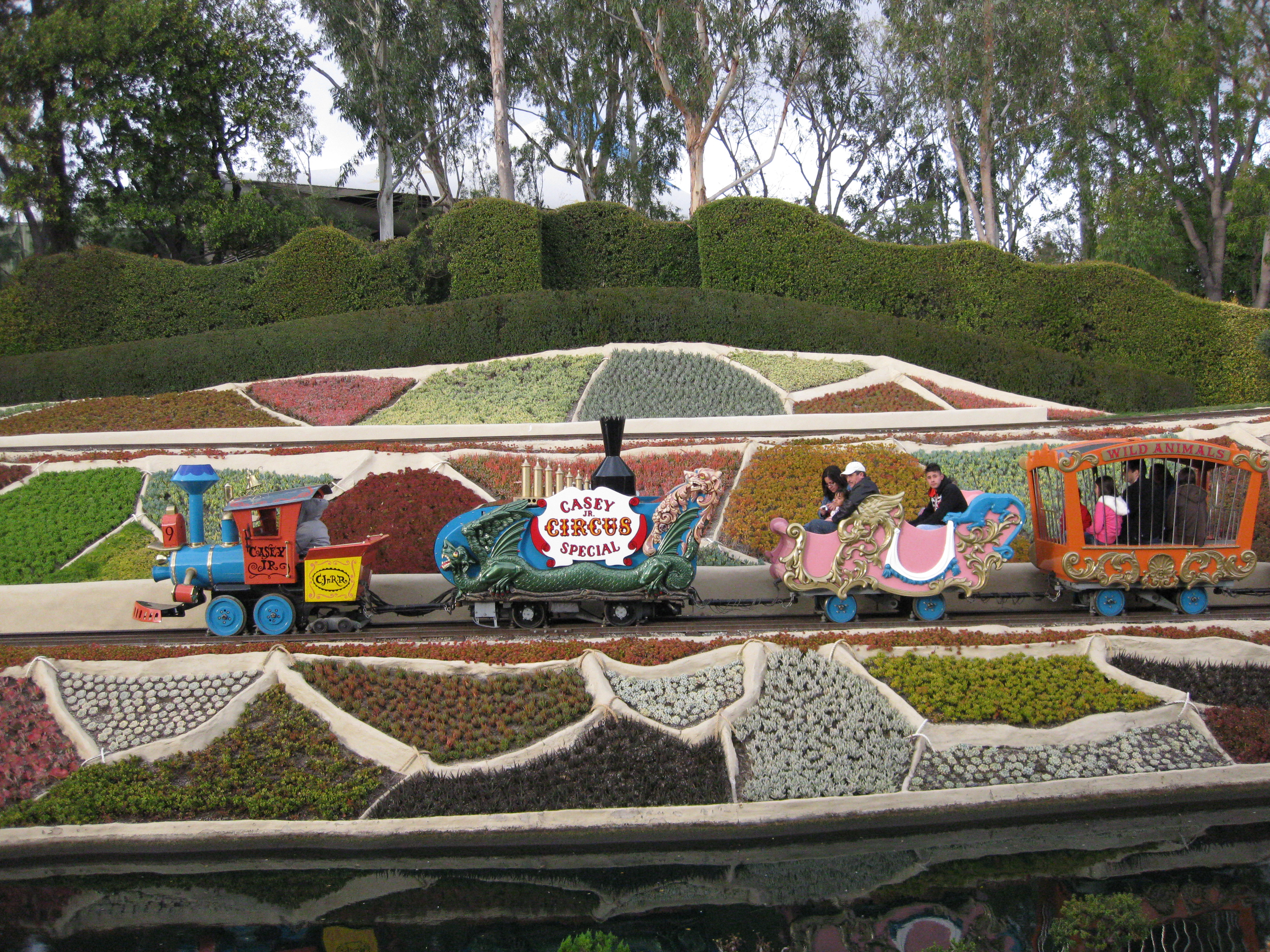
- Casey Jr. Circus Train No. 9 at Disneyland, California

Disneyland
- Area: Fantasyland
- Coordinates: 33.8137°N 117.9193°W
- Status: Operating
- Opening date: July 31, 1955

Disneyland Park (Paris)
- Name: Casey Jr. – le Petit Train du Cirque (English; “Casey Jr. — The Small Circus Train”)
- Area: Fantasyland
- Coordinates: 48.8754°N 2.7751°E
- Status: Operating
- Opening date: March 20, 1994

Ride statistics
- Designer: WED Enterprises / Walt Disney Imagineering
- Theme: Dumbo
- G-force: 1
- Vehicle type: Train
- Duration: 3:40 (Disneyland)
- Hosted by: Ringmaster
- Manufacturer: Arrow Development (Disneyland); Vekoma (Disneyland Paris)
- Must transfer from wheelchair

The Casey Jr. Circus Train is the name of a 2 ft (610 mm) narrow-gauge railroad attraction found at Disneyland and a powered roller coaster attraction found at Disneyland Park (Paris). It is based on the train from Dumbo. This tour is similar to the one given on the slower paced Storybook Land Canal Boats, but does not incorporate narration.

== Description ==
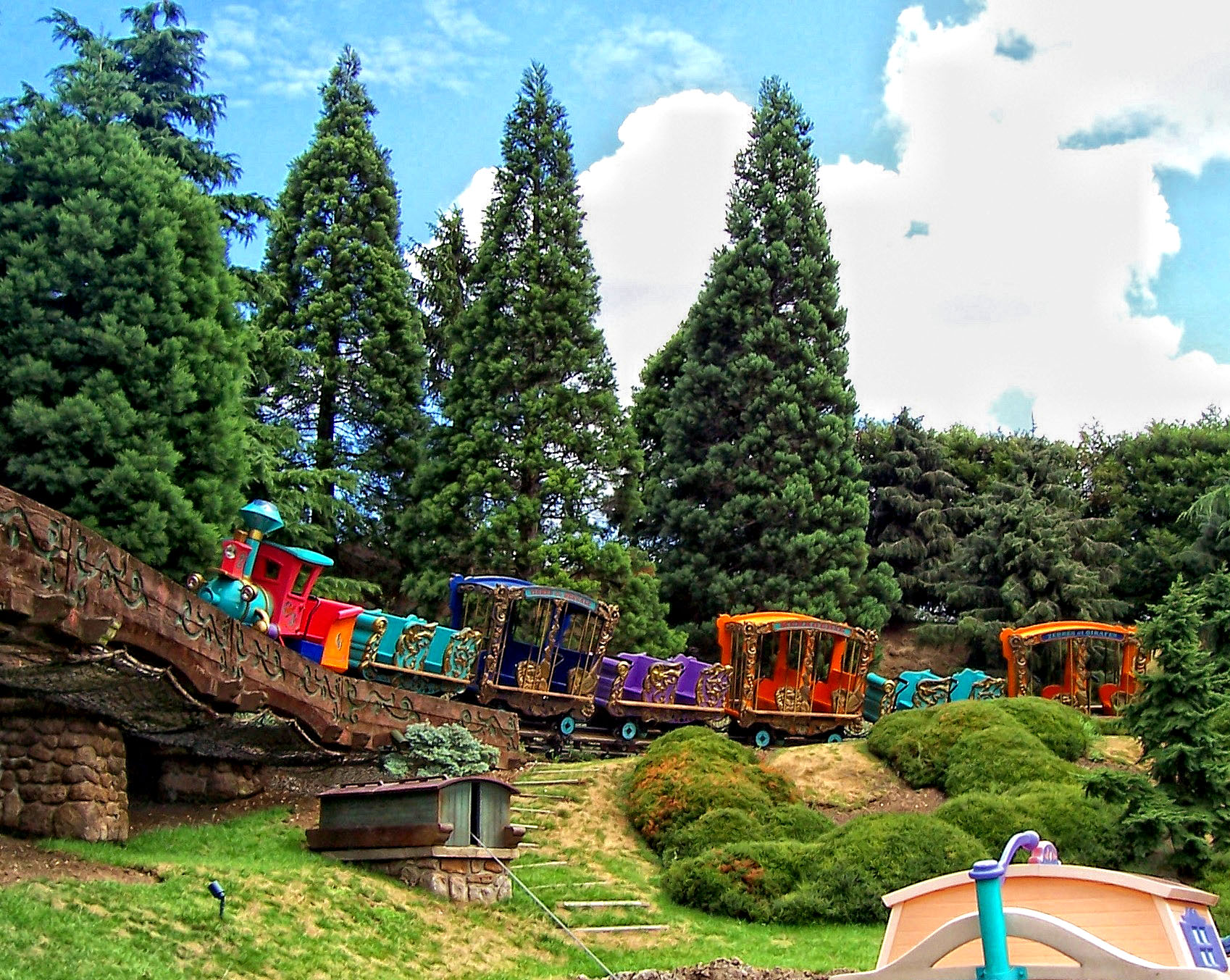
Casey Jr. at Disneyland Paris

The original attraction at Disneyland was operating during the grand opening of Disneyland on July 17, 1955, but was closed the following day for safety testing and reopened on July 31, 1955. It gives passengers a tour of many miniature versions of scenes from Disney animated films.

Casey Jr. Circus Train at Disneyland Paris opened on March 20, 1994. Unlike its California counterpart, the Paris version is designed as a roller coaster for small children through Storybook Land, giving riders good views of the Storybook Land castle and other scenes that are not as visible from the Storybook Land Canal Boats.

The original 2 ft (610 mm) narrow gauge internal combustion-powered railroad version at Disneyland was manufactured by Arrow Development. The powered roller coaster version of the ride in Disneyland Paris was manufactured by Vekoma.

A video of the attraction at Disneyland California.

== See also ==
- Casey Jr. Splash 'n' Soak Station
- Rail transport in Walt Disney Parks and Resorts

== Bibliography ==
- Broggie, Michael (2014), Walt Disney's Railroad Story: The Small-Scale Fascination That Led to a Full-Scale Kingdom (4th ed.), The Donning Company Publishers, ISBN 978-1-57864-914-3
