= Dumbo the Flying Elephant =

Ride at six Disney parks

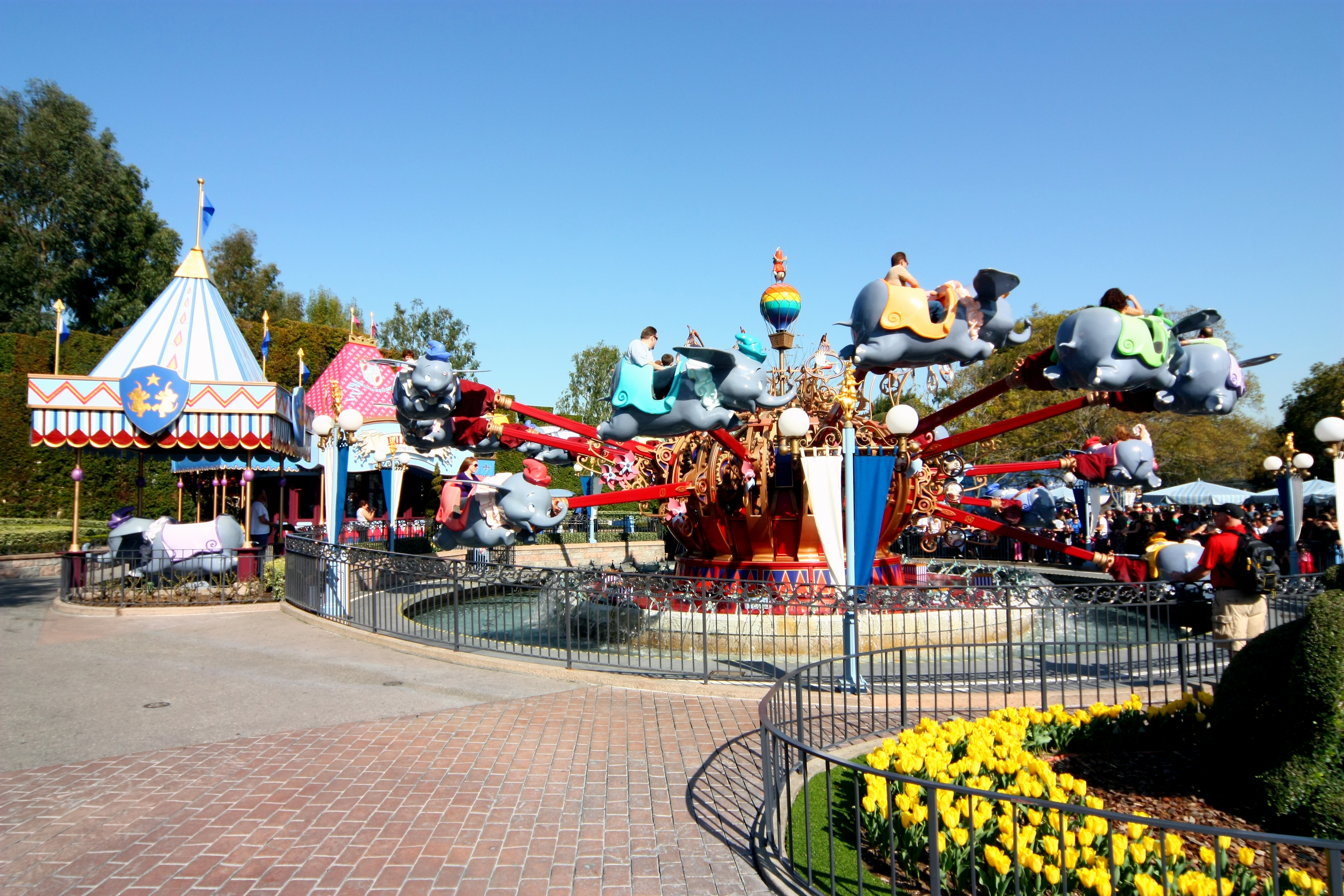
- Dumbo the Flying Elephant at Disneyland

Disneyland
- Area: Fantasyland
- Coordinates: 33.81367°N 117.91891°W
- Status: Operating
- Opening date: August 16, 1955

Magic Kingdom
- Area: Fantasyland (Storybook Circus; 2012–present)
- Coordinates: 28.42036°N 81.5810°W
- Status: Operating
- Soft opening date: March 12, 2012 (relocation)
- Opening date: October 1, 1971 (original); March 21, 2012 (relocation)
- Lightning Lane available

Tokyo Disneyland
- Name: 空飛ぶダンボ(in Japanese)
- Area: Fantasyland
- Coordinates: 35.63147°N 139.8817°E
- Status: Operating
- Opening date: April 15, 1983

Disneyland Park (Paris)
- Area: Fantasyland
- Coordinates: 48.874°N 2.77455°E
- Status: Operating
- Opening date: April 12, 1992

Hong Kong Disneyland
- Name: 小飛象旋轉世界
- Area: Fantasyland
- Coordinates: 22.31236°N 114.0402°E
- Status: Operating
- Opening date: September 12, 2005

Shanghai Disneyland
- Name: 小飞象
- Area: Gardens of Imagination
- Status: Operating
- Soft opening date: May 7, 2016
- Opening date: June 16, 2016

Ride statistics
- Attraction type: Aerial carousel
- Manufacturers: Arrow Development (Disneyland); Zamperla
- Designer: Walt Disney Imagineering
- Theme: Dumbo
- Music: Compositions by Frank Churchill and Oliver Wallace, and Circus Music (Florida and Shanghai); Whip and Spur & Other Circus Marches (Paris and Tokyo)
- Vehicle type: Flying Dumbo elephants
- Riders per vehicle: 2–3
- Rows: 1
- Riders per row: 2 (3 with small child on lap)
- Sponsor: Scentsy (Florida; 2023–present); China Eastern Airlines (Shanghai)
- Host: Timothy Q. Mouse
- Must transfer from wheelchair

Dumbo the Flying Elephant is an aerial carousel-style ride located in Fantasyland at six Disney theme parks around the world. It is based on Disney's 1941 animated feature film, Dumbo. The original attraction opened at Disneyland on August 16, 1955. The five other versions of the attraction were opening-day attractions at their respective parks. It is the only attraction that can be found at all six Disney castle parks worldwide.

One elephant from the ride is in the collection of the Smithsonian National Museum of American History in Washington, D.C., donated in 2005, on the occasion of Disneyland's 50th anniversary.

== Attraction ==
Based on the character from the 1941 animated feature, the 16 ride vehicles each resemble Dumbo, and are mounted on articulated armatures connected to a rotating hub. The passengers ride in the "Dumbos" and can maneuver them up and down with a joystick that operates a hydraulic ram. The ride itself rotates counterclockwise at a constant rate.

A figure of Timothy Q. Mouse, currently voiced by Chris Edgerly, rides atop the central hub. Originally at Magic Kingdom, the figure held a training whip and stood on a disco ball. With the exception of Disneyland and Tokyo Disneyland, he currently stands on a hot air balloon and holds the "magic feather". Starting in 2012, Magic Kingdom's Timothy currently spins with his magic feather on top of the attraction's marquee.

Each of the parks, with the exception of Disneyland Paris, has an extra Dumbo vehicle located outside of the attraction to be used by guests for better photo opportunities. Tokyo Disneyland's photo spot differs from its three counterparts; the character is shown in his regular outfit from the original film, with a pink saddle blanket and Timothy Mouse in his hat.

All of the Dumbo attractions spin counterclockwise. An additional aerial carousel was added with the relocation of Magic Kingdom's Dumbo attraction to the New Fantasyland, where one spins counterclockwise while the other one spins clockwise, the first and only Dumbo attraction to feature two carousels.

== History ==
=== Disneyland ===
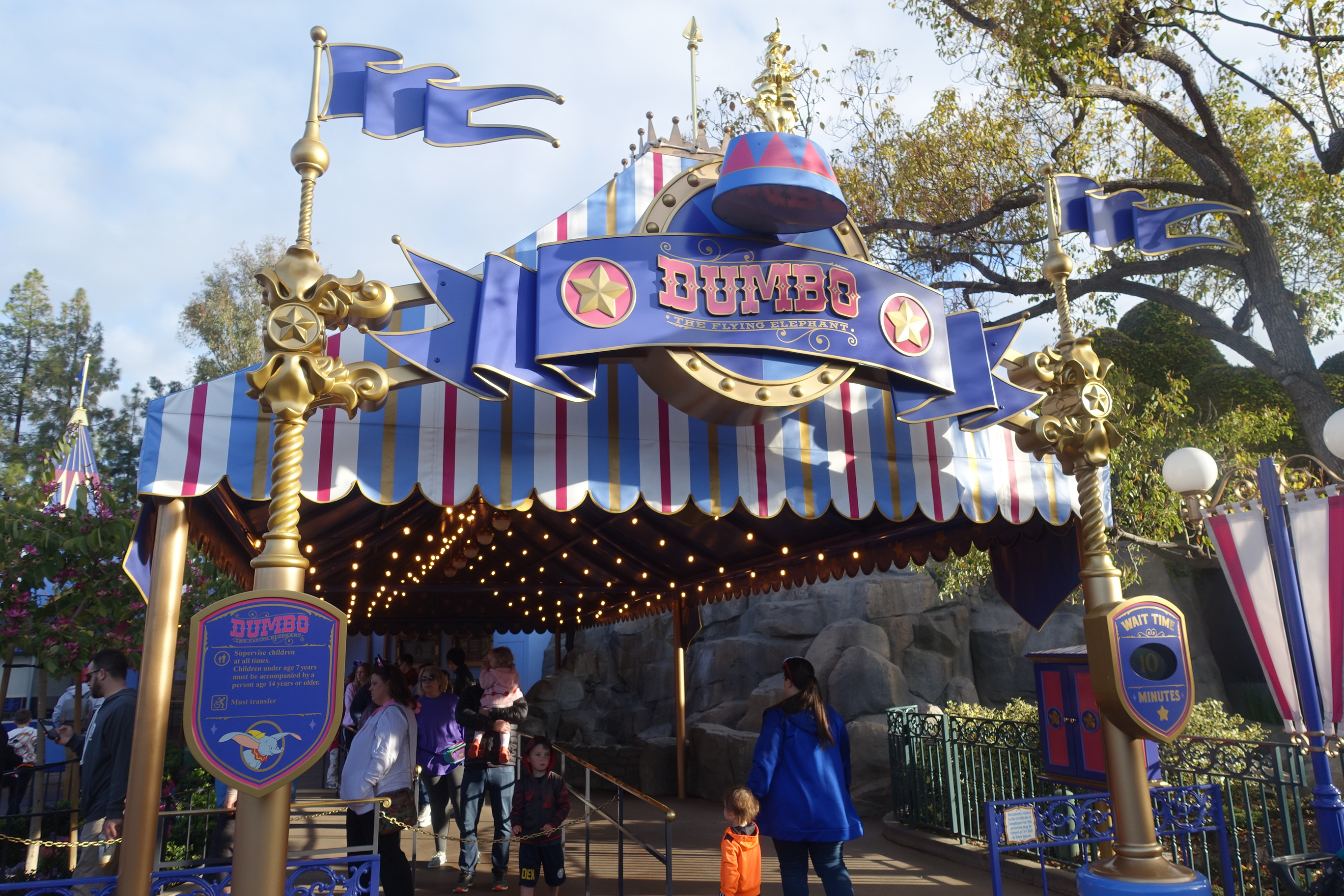
The sign of Dumbo the Flying Elephant at Disneyland

The original design of the attraction had 10 ride vehicles which were intended to represent not the "one and only" Dumbo, but the alcohol-induced "pink elephants" scene from the film. The installation at Disneyland was manufactured by Arrow Development.

The ride was scheduled to be one of Disneyland's opening-day attractions, but instead opened a month after the park's grand opening, due to flawed prototypes. For the first two years, the hub of the original Dumbo ride lacked the ball with the Timothy Mouse figure. Also, the original Dumbos has hinged ears that were supposed to flap, but failed, due to a number of mechanical problems. (Contrary to this, an original Dumbo vehicle with functioning flapping ears was featured in a scene during the first-season opening song to Wednesday's "Anything Can Happen Day" of the original Mickey Mouse Club series.) So, the ears remained stationary until sometime between 1963 and 1964, when new Dumbos were given casts with no hinges for movement. The new vehicles also featured eyes with big black pupils instead of small black pupils with blue irises. This lasted until 1998, when it was switched back to the former blue-iris design.

During the 1970s, the attraction was planned to be expanded and renamed "Dumbo's Circusland" and was displayed in "Disneyland Presents a Preview of Coming Attractions", but was cancelled. The attraction was given another update around April 1978, with the ride's center having a slight redesign, and the color of the elephants' clothing changing to a matching pale 3-color palette.

In 1983, as part of Fantasyland's major remodeling, the ride was moved to where Skull Rock used to be, allowing Dumbo's original location to be a shortcut to Frontierland. It was completely rebuilt with a kinetic toymaker-like design, although ten elephants were still used and Timothy still held the whip. In a featurette of the ride, as shown on the DVD release of the film's 70th anniversary, the head Disney imagineer, Tony Baxter, even noted that the new ride looked like one of Geppetto's inventions.

In 1990, the attraction was updated with the 16 rainbow-colored vehicles (and Timothy's magic feather) originally intended for installation at Disneyland Paris, after an incident during which a bracket support broke. The elephants' clothing also changed for the third time to a full 8-color rainbow palette.

During the 1992 Disneyana convention, one of the original ride vehicles sold for US$16,000. Like other remaining 1955 attractions, one of Disneyland's Dumbos was painted gold in honor of the park's 50th anniversary in 2005. Around that same time, Timothy's magic feather was replaced by the whip.

At Disneyland, a circa 1915 band organ occasionally provides background music for the attraction. This powerful instrument can be heard more than a mile away, so it is rarely played.

In 2018, the queue of the ride was expanded and is now covered with new shade structures. Also riders are now assigned to specific Dumbo elephants. The queue is now completely wheelchair accessible.

=== Magic Kingdom ===
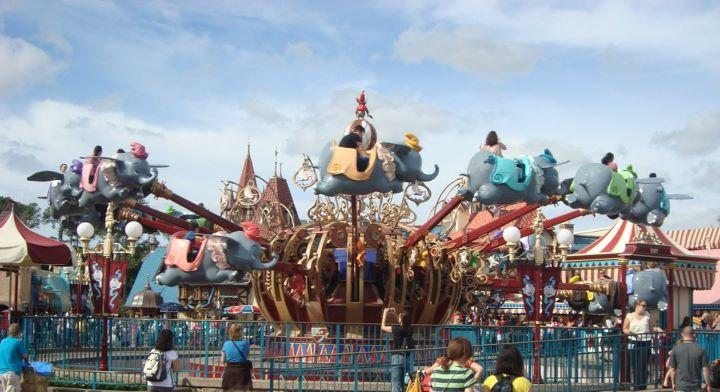
Dumbo the Flying Elephant at Magic Kingdom, before the new Fantasyland expansion

Magic Kingdom's original 1971 version of this attraction was designed differently from its 1955 Disneyland counterpart. On opening day, it not only soft-opened without Timothy and his disco ball, but the elephants created for this version oddly wore no hats. The test vehicles were eventually re-updated shortly afterwards with the elephants now wearing hats, like the Disneyland version, while Timothy and his ball were eventually added around 1972.

The ride was later updated with the 16 vehicles and the new ride mechanism in 1993. However, it does not include a central water feature like its Disneyland, Disneyland Paris, and Hong Kong Disneyland counterparts; the utilidors running directly below the attraction prevented the installation of water pipes necessary for the water features to operate. Also for this version, as well as its Disneyland Paris and Hong Kong Disneyland counterparts, Timothy's hot air balloon had red and white stripes, rather than rainbow stripes for the Disneyland version. In 1997, the attraction's queue was covered to provide shade and decorated with topiaries.

For nostalgic visitors, a replica of Magic Kingdom's 1971 version (with slightly altered colors being the only change) currently exists at Tokyo Disneyland, being the only park to still feature 10 flying elephants and Timothy spinning on a disco ball. It is also the only other park, aside from Disneyland, to have Timothy holding a whip. This all changed in October 2026 after a lengthy refurbishment that completely changed the color scheme, feature more blue tones, and replaced the whip with a golden magic feather.

Magic Kingdom's Fantasyland underwent a large expansion and renovation that began in 2011. The new Fantasyland was constructed in phases with the first half of the storybook circus open by mid-2012; a section dedicated to The Little Mermaid, a section dedicated to Beauty and the Beast, and the second half of storybook circus were opened by December 6, 2012, some additional attractions opened in 2013, and the final phase was the opening of the Seven Dwarfs Mine Train, which soft-opened in mid-May 2014, and officially opened on May 28. Some elements of Mickey's Toontown Fair were demolished and others were rethemed to a new Storybook Circus area. An expanded Dumbo the Flying Elephant ride was built in this new location with an interactive queue.

Storybook Circus began soft openings on March 12, 2012, including one of the new Dumbo carousels. The southern end of Storybook Circus had a delayed opening on March 21, 2012. During the soft openings, it was revealed that the new attraction received the water features that have been included with the attraction in many other Disney Parks around the world. However, unlike the other versions, an additional effect occurs at night when the fountain lights change colors, an effect that was picked up from the Disneyland version, but with more colors. The Dumbo vehicles, which are richly detailed and vibrantly colored, now spin clockwise from the original version, which was reconstructed next to the new one, that soft-opened on June 22. The two rides therefore rotate counter to each other. The attraction also features a new soundtrack and artwork panels at the bottom of the carousels that tell the story of Dumbo, like the Prince Charming Regal Carrousel attraction. However, a new central hub was introduced that lacks the hot air balloon with Timothy Mouse and the magic feather. This figure has been moved above the attraction's marquee. A signature feature of this version is an indoor queue themed to the Bigtop from the film. Inside guests receive ticket-themed pagers where they can wait until prompted, and small children can play in the play area themed to Dumbo's fire rescue stunt scene.

=== Shanghai Disneyland ===
Unlike the other Disney parks, this installment of the ride is the only version that is not placed at the park's Fantasyland. Instead, it is placed at the Gardens of Imagination.

== Gallery ==
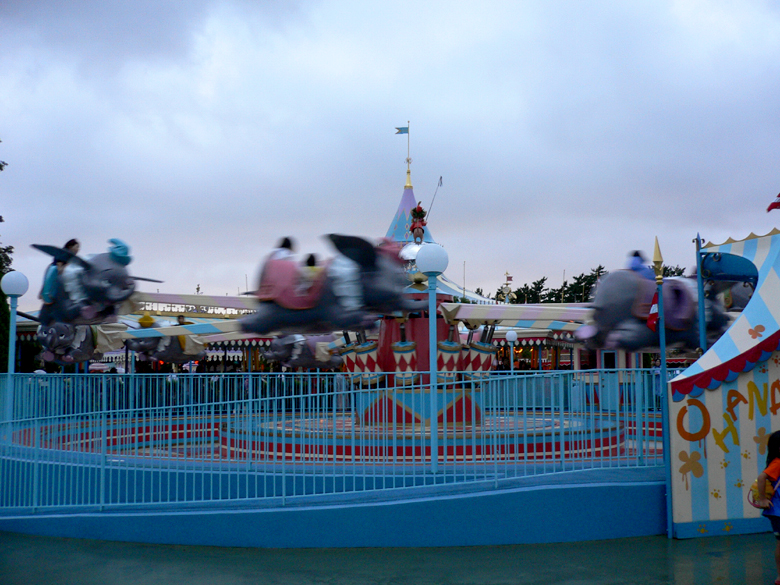
Dumbo the Flying Elephant at Tokyo Disneyland

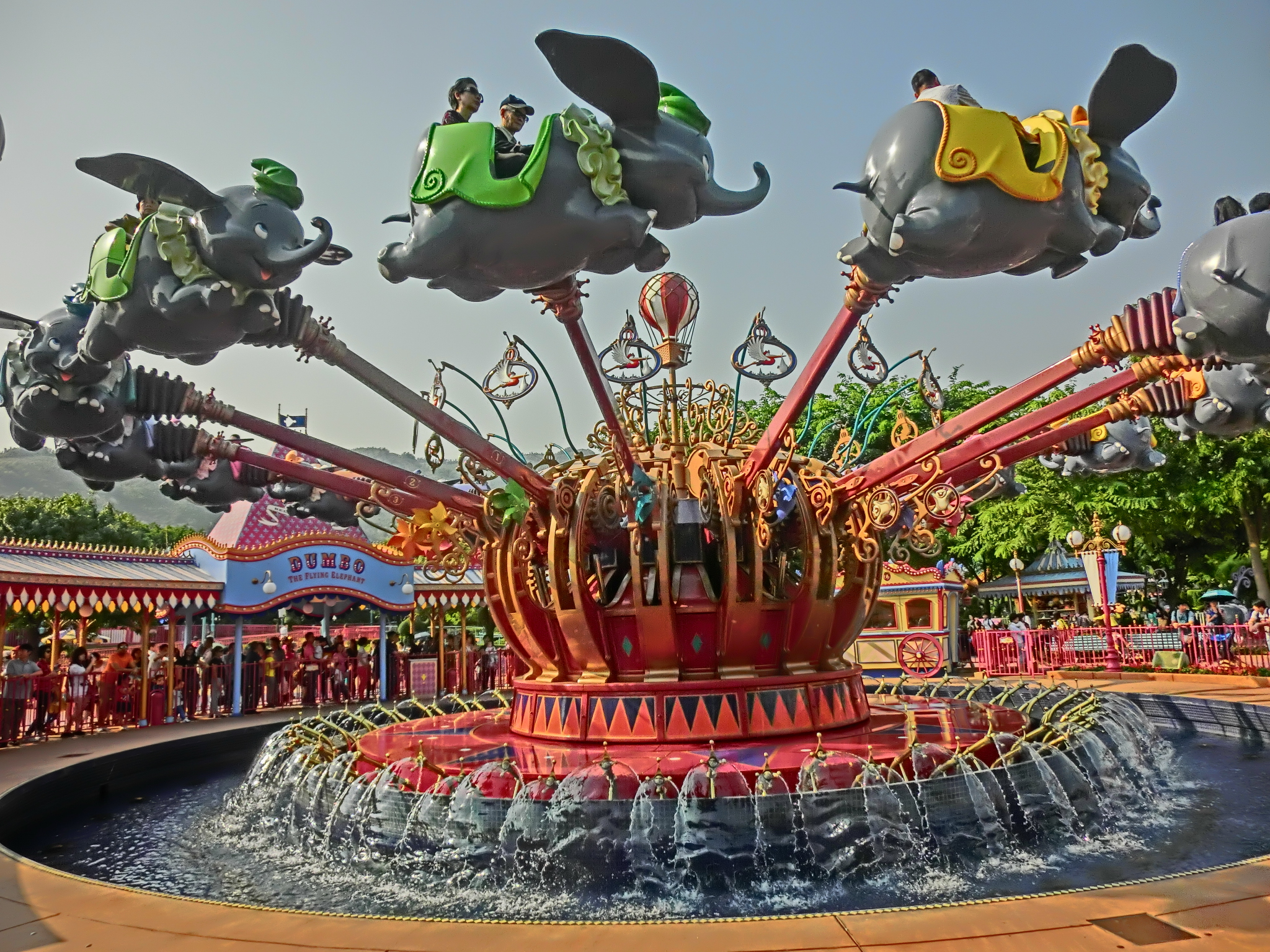
Dumbo the Flying Elephant at Hong Kong Disneyland
