= List of Disney theme park attractions =

The following table shows most of the attractions found in all of the Disney Experiences around the world.

Key:

Attraction is operating (this includes attractions which are temporarily closed for reasons such as seasonal operation or routine maintenance).
Attraction is planned or under construction.
Attraction is permanently closed and no longer exists.
Attraction exists but is no longer operating.
Attraction does not exist at this location.

== A – C ==
Attraction	Opening Year	Disneyland Resort		Walt Disney World Resort				Disneyland Paris		Tokyo Disney Resort		Hong Kong Disneyland Resort	Shanghai Disney Resort	Disneyland Resort Abu Dhabi
Attraction	Opening Year	Disneyland	Disney California Adventure	Magic Kingdom	Epcot	Disney's Hollywood Studios	Disney's Animal Kingdom	Disneyland Park (Paris)	Disney Adventure World	Tokyo Disneyland	Tokyo DisneySea	Hong Kong Disneyland	Shanghai Disneyland	Disneyland Abu Dhabi
Adventure Isle	1992							Adventureland (1992–present)						
Adventure Thru Inner Space	1967	Tomorrowland (1967–1985)												
Adventureland Treehouse	2023	Adventureland (2023–present)												
Aladdin's Enchanted Passage	1993							Adventureland (1993–present)						
Aladdin's Oasis Dinner Show	1993	Adventureland (1993–1996)												
Aladdin's Royal Caravan	1992	(1993–1994)				(1992–1995)		(1993–1994)						
Alice & the Queen of Hearts: Back to Wonderland	2024								Production Courtyard, World Premiere Plaza, Adventure Way (2024–present)					
Alice in Wonderland	1958	Fantasyland (1958–present)												
Alice's Curious Labyrinth	1992							Fantasyland (1992–present)					Fantasyland (as Alice In Wonderland Maze) (2016–present)	
Alien Swirling Saucers	2018					Toy Story Land (2018–present)								
Aluminum Hall of Fame	1955	Tomorrowland (1955–1965)												
America on Parade	1975	Main Street, U.S.A. (1975–1977)		Main Street, USA (1975–1977)										
America Sings	1974	Tomorrowland (1974–1988)												
America the Beautiful (Circle-Vision 360° film)	1967	Tomorrowland (1967–1984)												
American Adventure, The	1982				World Showcase (1982–present)									
American Idol Experience, The	2009					Echo Lake (2009–2014)								
American Space Experience, The	1998	Tomorrowland (1998–2003)												
Animagique	2002								Toon Studio (2002–2016)					
Animation Academy	2002		Hollywood Land (2007–present)		Animation Academy with Edna Mode; World Discovery	Animation Courtyard (2004–2015); Olaf Draws!; The Walt Disney Studios Lot (2026)	Animation Experience; Rafiki's Planet Watch (2019–2026)		Art of Disney Animation; Animation Courtyard (2002–2025); World Premiere Plaza (2025)			Main Street, U.S.A. (2007–present)	Marvel Comic Academy; Gardens of Imagination (2016–present)	
Ant-Man and The Wasp: Nano Battle!	2019											Tomorrowland (2019–2026) Stark Expo (2026)		
Antonio's Fiesta de Encanto	2027						Tropical Americas (Opening in 2027)							
Aquatopia	2001										Port Discovery (2001–2026)			
Ariel's Grotto, aka Ariel's Greeting Grotto	1996	Fantasyland (1996–2008)	Paradise Pier (2001–2018)	Fantasyland (1996–2010, 2012–present)							Mermaid Lagoon (as Ariel's Greeting Grotto) (2005–2020)			
Ariel's Playground	2001										Mermaid Lagoon (2001–present)			
Armageddon – Les Effets Speciaux	2002								Backlot (2002–2020)					
Art of Animation	2008		See "Disney Animation"			See "Magic of Disney Animation, The"			See "Art of Disney Animation"			Main Street, USA (2008–present)		
Art of Animation, The (1960s exhibit)	1960	Tomorrowland (1960–1966)												
Art of Disney Animation	2002		See "Disney Animation"			See "Magic of Disney Animation, The"			Toon Studio (2002–2019)			See "Art of Animation"		
Astro Orbiter, aka Astro Jets, Astro Orbitor, Orbitron, Rocket Jets, Star Jets, Tomorrowland Jets	1956	Tomorrowland (as Astro Jets, Tomorrowland Jets, Rocket Jets, or Astro Orbitor) (1956–present)		Tomorrowland (as Star Jets or Astro Orbiter) (1974–present)				Discoveryland (as Orbitron) (1992–present)		Tomorrowland (as Star Jets) (1983–2017)		Tomorrowland (as Orbitron) (2005–present)		
Autopia, aka Grand Circuit Raceway, Grand Prix Raceway, Tomorrowland Indy Speedway, Tomorrowland Speedway	1955	Tomorrowland (1955–present)		Tomorrowland (as Grand Prix Raceway, Tomorrowland Indy Speedway, or Tomorrowland Speedway) (1971–present)				Discoveryland (1992–present)		Tomorrowland (as Grand Circuit Raceway) (1983–2017)		Tomorrowland (2006–2016)		
Avatar Flight of Passage	2017						Pandora-The World of Avatar (2017–present)							
Avengers Assemble: Flight Force	2022								Avengers Campus (2022–present)					
Avengers Infinity Defense	2028		Avengers Campus (Opening in 2028)											
Awesome Planet	2020				The Land (2020–present)									
The Bakery Tour	2001		Pacific Wharf (2001–2023); San Fransokyo Square (2023–present)											
The Barnstormer at Goofy's Wiseacre Farm	1996			Mickey's Toontown Fair (1996–2011) (rethemed as "The Barnstormer featuring Goofy as the Great Goofini")										
The Barnstormer featuring Goofy as the Great Goofini	2012			Storybook Circus (2012–present) (rethemed from "The Barnstormer at Goofy's Wiseacre Farm")										
Beauty and the Beast Sing-Along	2020				World Showcase (2020–present)									
Beauty and the Beast Live on Stage	1991	Fantasyland Theatre (1992–1995)				Sunset Boulevard (1991–present)		Discovery Land (1992–1996)						
Believe... In Holiday Magic	2000	(2000–present)												
Believe... There's Magic in the Stars	2000	(2000–2004)												
Big Grizzly Mountain Runaway Mine Cars	2012											Grizzly Gulch (2012–present)		
Big Thunder Mountain Railroad	1979	Frontierland (1979–present)		Frontierland (1980–present)				Frontierland (as Big Thunder Mountain) (1992–present)		Westernland (as Big Thunder Mountain) (1987–present)				
Block Party Bash (parade/show)	2005		(2005–2008)			(2008–2011)								
Blowfish Balloon Race	2001										Mermaid Lagoon (2001–present)			
Body Wars	1989				Future World (1989–2007)									
BraviSEAmo!	2004									Mediterranean Harbor (2004–2010)				
Buzz Lightyear attractions (names vary)	1998	Tomorrowland (as Buzz Lightyear Astro Blasters) (2005–present)		Tomorrowland (as Buzz Lightyear's Space Ranger Spin) (1998–2025; 2026-present)				Discoveryland (as Buzz Lightyear Lazer Blast) (2006–present)		Tomorrowland (as Buzz Lightyear's Astro Blasters) (2004–2024)		Tomorrowland (as Buzz Lightyear Astro Blasters) (2005–2017)	Tomorrowland (as Buzz Lightyear Planet Rescue) (2016–present)	
Canada Pavilion	1982				World Showcase (1982–present)									
Canada: Far and Wide	2020				World Showcase (2020–present)									
Captain EO	1986	Tomorrowland (1986–1997, 2010–2014)			Future World (1986–1994, 2010–2015)			Discoveryland (1992–1998, 2010–2015)		Tomorrowland (1987–1996, 2010–2014)				
Carnival de Lumiere	1982				World Showcase (1982–1983) (replaced by "A New World Fantasy")									
Carrousel de Lancelot	1992							Fantasyland (1992–present)						
Castle of Magical Dreams	2020											Fantasyland (2020–present)		
Carousel of Progress, aka Walt Disney's Carousel of Progress	1967	Tomorrowland (1967–1973)		Tomorrowland (as Walt Disney's Carousel of Progress) (1975–present)										
Cars Quatre Roues Rallye	2007								Toon Studio, Worlds of Pixar (2007–present)					
Cars Ridge Run Rally	2028			Piston Peak National Park (Opening in 2028)										
Cars: Road Trip	2021								Toon Studio, Worlds of Pixar (2021–present)					
Casey Jr. Circus Train	1955	Fantasyland (1955–present)						Fantasyland (1994–present)						
Castle Carrousel										See "Prince Charming Regal Carrousel"				
Celebrate the Magic	2012		(2012–2016)											
Celebrate! Tokyo Disneyland	2018									(2018–2019)				
China Pavilion	1982				World Showcase (1982–present)									
Chip 'n Dale's Treehouse	1993	Mickey's Toontown (1993–2022)								Toontown				
A Christmas Fantasy Parade	1995	(1995–present)												
Cinderella Carousel												See "Prince Charming Regal Carrousel"		
Cinderella Castle	1971			Fantasyland (1971–present)						Fantasyland (1983–present)				
Cinderella's Golden Carrousel				See "Prince Charming Regal Carrousel"										
CinéMagique	2002								Production Courtyard (2002–2017)					
Circarama		See "Circle-Vision"												
Circle of Life: An Environmental Fable	1995				The Land (1995–2018)									
Circle-Vision, aka Circarama	1955	Tomorrowland (1955–1997)												
Club 33	1967	New Orleans Square (1967–present)								World Bazaar (1983–present)			Mickey Avenue (2016–present)	
CommuniCore	1982				Future World (1982–1994)									
Countdown to Extinction							See "Dinosaur"							
Country Bear Jamboree AKA Country Bear Theater	1971	Critter Country (1972–2001)		Frontierland (1971–2024); (as Country Bear Musical Jamboree) (2024–present)						Westernland (1983–present)				
Cranium Command	1989				Future World (1989–2007)									
Crush's Coaster	2007							Toon Studio, Worlds of Pixar (2007–present)						

== D – F ==
Attraction	Opening Year	Disneyland Resort		Walt Disney World Resort				Disneyland Paris		Tokyo Disney Resort		Hong Kong Disneyland Resort	Shanghai Disney Resort	Disneyland Resort Abu Dhabi
Attraction	Opening Year	Disneyland	Disney California Adventure	Magic Kingdom	Epcot	Disney's Hollywood Studios	Disney's Animal Kingdom	Disneyland Park (Paris)	Disney Adventure World	Tokyo Disneyland	Tokyo DisneySea	Hong Kong Disneyland	Shanghai Disneyland	Disneyland Abu Dhabi
Dapper Dans, The, aka The Mainstreet Quartet	1959	Main Street, U.S.A (1959–present)		Main Street, USA (1971–present)				Main Street, USA (as The Mainstreet Quartet) (1992–1995)				Main Street, USA (2005–present)		
Davy Crockett's Explorer Canoes, aka Beaver Brothers Explorer Canoes, Indian Canoes	1956	Frontierland (Indian War Canoes; 1956–1972); Bear Country (1972–1989); Critter Country (1989–present)		Frontierland (1971–1994)				Frontierland (1992–1994) (as Indian Canoes)		Critter Country (1991–present) (as Davy Crockett's Explorer Canoes or Beaver Brothers Explorer Canoes)			Treasure Cove (as Explorer Canoes) (2016–present)	
Delta Dreamflight	1989			Tomorrowland (1989–1998)										
Dinosaur	1998						DinoLand, U.S.A. (1998–2026)							
Discovery Arcade	1992							Main Street, USA (1992–present)						
Discovery River Boats	1998						Discovery Island & Asia (1998–1999)							
Disney Afternoon Avenue	1991	Fantasyland (1991)												
Disney & Pixar Short Film Festival	2015		Hollywood Land, as Pixar Shorts Film Festival (2018)		Future World (2015–2021); World Celebration (2021–present)			Discoveryland (2016–2017)						
Disney Animation	2001		Hollywood Land (2001–present)			See "Magic of Disney Animation, The"			See "Art of Disney Animation"			See "Art of Animation"		
Disney Cascade of Lights	2026								bgcolor=#80fff80					
Disney Dreams!	2012							Main Street USA (2012–2017) (2023–present)						
Disney Enchantment	2021			(2021–2023)										
The Disney Gallery	1987	New Orleans Square (1987–2007); Main Street, U.S.A (2009–present)								World Bazaar (1994–2016)				
Disney Illuminations	2017							(2017–2023)						
Disney in the Stars	2005											(2005–2018)		
Disney Junior – Live on Stage!, before "Playhouse Disney live on Stage"	2001		Hollywood Pictures Backlot (2003–2017)			Animation Courtyard (2001–2018)			Production Courtyard (2009–2019)					
Disney Jr. Dance Party!	2017		Hollywood Land (2017–2025)			Animation Courtyard (2018–2020)								
Disney Jr. Play & Dance!	2020					Animation Courtyard (2020—2025)								
Disney Jr. Dream Factory	2021								Production Courtyard, World Premiere Plaza (2021–present)					
Disney on Parade	2005											(2005–2011)		
Disney Stars and Motor Cars Parade	2001					(2001–2008)								
Disney Stars 'n' Cars	2009								(2009–2015)					
Disney Stars on Parade	2017							(2017–2023)						
Disney Starlight: Dream the Night Away	2025							(2025-present)						
Disney Studio 1	2002								Front Lot (2002–2024)					
Disney Villains: Unfairly Ever After	2025					Sunset Boulevard (2025–present)								
Disneyland Forever	2015	(2015–2016, 2019)												
Disneyland Monorail	1959	Tomorrowland (1959–present)												
Disneyland Railroad/Walt Disney World Railroad	1955	Stops at Main Street, U.S.A.; New Orleans Square; Mickey's Toontown; and Tomorrowland (1955–present)		Stops at Main Street, USA, Frontierland and Storybook circus (as Walt Disney World Railroad) (1971–present)				Stops at Main Street, U.S.A.; Frontierland; Fantasyland; and Discoveryland (1992–present)				Stops at Main Street, U.S.A., and Fantasyland (2005–present)		
Disneyland Story Presenting Great Moments with Mr. Lincoln, The		See "Great Moments with Mr. Lincoln"												
Disneyland: The First 50 Magical Years	2005	Main Street U.S.A. (2005–2009)												
Disney's Aladdin: A Musical Spectacular	2003		Hollywood Land (2003–2016)											
Disney's Celebrate America	2008	(2008–present)	(2011–present)	(2008–present)										
Disney's Dreams Come True Parade	2006			(2006–2009)										
Disney's Eureka! A California Parade	2001		(2001–2002)											
Disney's Fantillusion	1995							(2003–2012)		(1995–2001)				
Disney's LuminAria	2001		Paradise Pier (2001–2002)											
DisneySea Electric Railway	2001										American Waterfront & Port Discovery (2001–present)			
DisneySea Transit Steamer Line	2001										Mediterranean Harbor, American Waterfront, & Lost River Delta (2001–present)			
Disney Tales of Magic	2025													
Donald's Boat	1988	Mickey's Toontown (1993–present)		Mickey's Toontown Fair (1988–2010)						Toontown				
Doctor Strange: Journey into the Mystic Arts	2021		Avengers Campus (2021–2024)						Avengers Campus (2024–)					
Doug: Live!	1999					Hollywood Boulevard (1999–2001)								
Dream-Along With Mickey	2006			Cinderella Castle (2006–2016)										
Dreamers Point	2023				World Celebration (2023)									
Dumbo the Flying Elephant	1955	Fantasyland (1955–present)		Fantasyland (1971–present)				Fantasyland (1992–present)		Fantasyland (1983–present)		Fantasyland (2005–present)	Gardens of Imagination (2016–present)	
Dutch Boy Color Gallery	1956	Tomorrowland (1956–1963)												
Earffel Tower	1989					Backlot Tour (1989–2016)			Front Lot (2002–present)					
Earth Station	1982				Future World (1982–1994)									
El Rio del Tiempo	1982				World Showcase, Mexico (1982–2007) (converted to "Gran Fiesta Tour Starring The Three Caballeros")									
Epcot Forever	2019				World Showcase (2019–2021, 2023)									
The EPCOT Experience Center	2019				Odyssey Pavilion (2019–2022)									
ElecTRONica	2010		Hollywood Pictures Backlot (2010–2012)											
Ellen's Energy Adventure	1996				Future World (1996–2017)									
Enchanted Storybook Castle	2016												Fantasyland (2016–present)	
Enchanted Tale of Beauty and the Beast	2020									Fantasyland (2020–present)				
Enchanted Tales with Belle	2012			Fantasyland (2012–present)										
Enchanted Tiki Room, The	1963	Adventureland (1963–present)		Adventureland (1971–present)						Adventureland (1983–1999)				
Enchanted Tiki Room: Now Playing "Get the Fever!", The	2000									Adventureland (2000–2008) (converted from "Walt Disney's Enchanted Tiki Room"; converted to "Enchanted Tiki Room: Stitch Presents Aloha e Komo Mai!, The")				
Enchanted Tiki Room: Stitch Presents Aloha e Komo Mai!, The	2008									Adventureland (2008–present) (converted from "Enchanted Tiki Room: Now Playing 'Get the Fever!', The")				
Enchanted Tiki Room (Under New Management), The	1998			Adventureland (1998–2011) (converted from "Walt Disney's Enchanted Tiki Room" and back again)										
Expedition Everest	2006						Asia (2006–2026)							
ExtraTERRORestrial Alien Encounter	1995			Tomorrowland (1995–2003)										
Fairy Tinker Bell's Busy Buggies	2024										Fantasy Springs			
Fantasmic!	1992	Frontierland (1992–present)				Sunset Boulevard (1998–present)					Mediterranean Harbor (2011–2020)			
Fantasy in the Sky (fireworks)	1958	(1958–1999, 2017–2018)		(1971–2003)				(1993–2005)						
Fantasyland Theater (cinema), aka The Mickey Mouse Club Theater	1955	Fantasyland (1955–1982)												
Fantasyland Theater (amphitheater)	1995	Fantasyland (1995–present) (converted from "Videopolis")												
Fashions and Fabrics Through the Ages	1965	Tomorrowland (1965–1966)												
Festival of the Lion King	1998						Camp Minnie-Mickey (1998–2014); Africa (2014–2020); (2021–present)					Adventureland (2005–present)		
Finding Nemo Submarine Voyage	2007	Tomorrowland (2007–present) (rethemed from "Submarine Voyage")												
Finding Nemo – The Musical	2007						DinoLand, U.S.A. (2007–2020); (as Finding Nemo: The Big Blue… and Beyond!) (2022–present)							
Flight Circle	1955	Tomorrowland (1955–1966)												
Flight to the Moon, aka Rocket to the Moon	1955	Tomorrowland (1955–1974) (converted to "Mission to Mars")		Tomorrowland (1971–1975) (converted to "Mission to Mars")										
Flights of Fantasy Parade	2011											(2011–2020)		
Flik's Flyers	2002		A Bug's Land (2002–2018)											
Flounder's Flying Fish Coaster	2001										Mermaid Lagoon (2001–present)			
Flying Saucers	1961	Tomorrowland (1961–1966)												
Food Rocks	1994				Future World (1994–2004)									
For the First Time in Forever: A Frozen Sing-Along Celebration	2014		Hollywood Land (2015–2016)			Echo Lake (2014–present)		Frontierland (2015–2018)				The Pavilion (2015)	Fantasyland (2016–present)	
Fortress Explorations	2001										Mediterranean Harbor (2001–present)			
Fountain of Nations	1982				Future World (1982–2019)									
France Pavilion	1982				World Showcase (1982–present)									
Francis' Ladybug Boogie	2002		A Bug's Land (2002–2018)											
Frontierland Shootin' Arcade, aka Frontierland Shootin' Exposition, Rustler Roundup Shootin' Gallery, Westernland Shootin' Gallery	1957	Frontierland (as Frontierland Shootin' Exposition)(1957–present)		Frontierland (1971–2024)				Frontierland (as Rustler Roundup Shootin' Gallery) (1992–present)		Westernland (as Westernland Shootin' Gallery) (1983–present)				
Frontierland Shootin' Exposition		See "Frontierland Shootin' Arcade"												
Frozen Ever After AKA Anna and Elsa's Frozen Journey	2016				World Showcase, Norway (2016–present)				World of Frozen (2026)		Fantasy Springs (Frozen Kingdom) (as Anna and Elsa's Frozen Journey)	World of Frozen (2023)		
Frozen – Live at the Hyperion	2016		Hollywood Land (2016–2020)											

== G – I ==
Attraction	Opening Year	Disneyland Resort		Walt Disney World Resort				Disneyland Paris		Tokyo Disney Resort		Hong Kong Disneyland Resort	Shanghai Disney Resort	Disneyland Resort Abu Dhabi
Attraction	Opening Year	Disneyland	Disney California Adventure	Magic Kingdom	Epcot	Disney's Hollywood Studios	Disney's Animal Kingdom	Disneyland Park (Paris)	Disney Adventure World	Tokyo Disneyland	Tokyo DisneySea	Hong Kong Disneyland	Shanghai Disneyland	Disneyland Abu Dhabi
Gadget's Go Coaster	1993	Mickey's Toontown (1993–2022), As Chip 'n' Dale's Gadget Coaster (2023–present)								Toontown				
Games of Pixar Pier	2001		Games of the Boardwalk (2001–2018); Games of Pixar Pier (2018–present)											
Garden of the Twelve Friends	2016												Gardens of Imagination (2016–present)	
Germany Pavilion	1982				World Showcase (1982–present)									
Global Neighborhood	1994				Future World (1994–1999) (converted to "New Global Neighborhood")									
Golden Dreams	2001		Golden State (2001–2008)											
Golden Mickeys, The	2005											Fantasyland (2005–2015)		
Golden Zephyr	2001		Paradise Pier (2001–2018); Paradise Gardens Park (2018–present)											
Goofy's Playhouse	1993	Mickey's Toontown; Goofy's Bounce House (1993–2008); Goofy's Playhouse (2008–present)								Toontown; Goofy's Bounce House (1996–2012); Goofy's Paint 'n' Playhouse (2012–present)				
Goofy's Sky School	2011		Paradise Gardens Park (2011–present) (rethemed from "Mulholland Madness")											
Gorilla Falls Exploration Trail	1998						Asia; Pangani Forest Exploration Trail (1998–2016); Gorilla Falls Exploration Trail (2016–present)							
Gran Fiesta Tour Starring The Three Caballeros	2007				World Showcase, Mexico (2007–present) (converted from "El Rio del Tiempo")									
Grand Circuit Raceway										See "Autopia"				
Grand Prix Raceway				See "Autopia"										
Great Moments with Mr. Lincoln, aka The Walt Disney Story Featuring Great Moments with Mr. Lincoln, The Disneyland Story Presenting Great Moments with Mr. Lincoln	1965	Main Street, U.S.A. (1965–1972, 1975–2004, 2009–present)												
Great Movie Ride, The	1989					Hollywood Boulevard (1989–2017)								
Grizzly River Run	2001		Grizzly Peak (2001–present)											
Guardians of the Galaxy: Cosmic Rewind	2022				Wonders of Xandar Pavilion (as Guardians of the Galaxy: Cosmic Rewind: Holiday Remix) (2022–present, seasonal)									
Guardians of the Galaxy – Mission: Breakout!	2017		Hollywood Land (2017–2021) Avengers Campus (2021–present)											
Harmonious	2021				World Showcase (2021–2023)									
Hall of Chemistry	1955	Tomorrowland (1955–1966)												
Hall of Presidents, The	1971			Liberty Square (1971–present)										
Halloween Screams	2009	(2009–present)												
HalloWishes	2005			(2005–2018)										
Happily Ever After	2017			(2017–2021, 2023–present)										
Happy Circle	2016												Adventure Isle (2016–present)	
The Happy Ride with Baymax	2020									Tomorrowland (2020–present)				
Haunted Mansion	1969	New Orleans Square (1969–present)		Liberty Square (1971–present)				See "Phantom Manor"		Fantasyland (1983–present)		See "Mystic Manor"		
Haunted Mansion Holiday	2001	New Orleans Square (2001–present, seasonal)								Fantasyland (as Haunted Mansion Holiday Nightmare) (2004–present, seasonal)				
Heimlich's Chew Chew Train	2002		A Bug's Land (2002–2018)											
Holiday IllumiNations	1994				World Showcase (1994–1998, seasonal)									
Home of the Future		See "Monsanto House of the Future"												
Honey, I Shrunk the Audience!	1994	Tomorrowland (1998–2010)			Future World (1994–2010)			Discoveryland (1999–2010)		Tomorrowland (as Microadventure!) (1997–2010)				
Honey, I Shrunk the Kids: Movie Set Adventure	1990					Streets of America (1990–2016)								
Horizons	1983				Future World (1983–1999)									
House of the Future		See "Monsanto House of the Future"												
Hunny Pot Spin	2016												Fantasyland (2016–present)	
If You Had Wings	1972			Tomorrowland (1972–1987)										
Ignite the Dream	2016												(2016–2021)	
IllumiNations	1988				World Showcase (1988–1999) (replaced by "IllumiNations: Reflections of Earth")									
IllumiNations 2000: Reflections of Earth					See "IllumiNations: Reflections of Earth"									
IllumiNations: Reflections of Earth	1999				World Showcase (1999–2019)									
ImageWorks	1982				Future World (1982–1998) (converted to "ImageWorks – The "What If" Labs")									
ImageWorks: The What-If Labs	1999				Future World (1999–2021); World Celebration (2021–present) (converted from "ImageWorks")									
Imagination! Pavilion	1982				Future World (1982–2021); World Celebration (2021–present)									
Imagine... A Fantasy in the Sky	2004	(2004–2005)												
Impressions de France	1982				World Showcase, France (1982–present)									
Incredicoaster	2018		Pixar Pier (2018–present) (re-themed from "California Screamin'")											
Indian Village	1955	Frontierland (1955–1971)												
Indian War Canoes	1956	Frontierland (1956–1971) (rethemed as "Davy Crockett's Explorer Canoes")												
Indiana Jones Adventure	1995	Adventureland (1995–present)					Tropical America				Lost River Delta (2001–present)			
Indiana Jones Epic Stunt Spectacular!	1989					Echo Lake (1989–present)								
Indiana Jones et le Temple du Péril	1993							Adventureland (1993–present)						
Innoventions	1994	Tomorrowland (1998–2015)			Future World (1994–2019)									
Inside Out Emotional Whirlwind	2019		Pixar Pier (2019–present)											
Iron Man Experience	2017											Tomorrowland (2017–present); Stark Expo (future)		
Italy Pavilion	1982				World Showcase (1982–present)									
It's a Small World	1966	Fantasyland (1966–present)		Fantasyland (1971–present)				Fantasyland (1992–present)		Fantasyland (1983–2024)		Fantasyland (2008–present)		
It's a Small World with Groot	2025									Fantasyland (2025-Present)				
It's Tough to Be a Bug!	1998		A Bug's Land (2001–2018)				Discovery Island (1998–2025)							

== J – L ==
Attraction	Opening Year	Disneyland Resort		Walt Disney World Resort				Disneyland Paris		Tokyo Disney Resort		Hong Kong Disneyland Resort	Shanghai Disney Resort	Disneyland Resort Abu Dhabi
Attraction	Opening Year	Disneyland	Disney California Adventure	Magic Kingdom	Epcot	Disney's Hollywood Studios	Disney's Animal Kingdom	Disneyland Park (Paris)	Disney Adventure World	Tokyo Disneyland	Tokyo DisneySea	Hong Kong Disneyland	Shanghai Disneyland	Disneyland Abu Dhabi
Japan Pavilion	1982				World Showcase (1982–present)									
Jedi Training: Trials of the Temple	2006	Tomorrowland (2006–2018)				Echo Lake (2007–present)		Discoveryland (2015–2017)				Tomorrowland (2016–2021)		
Jessie's Critter Carousel	2019		Pixar Pier (2019–present)											
Jet Packs	2016												Tomorrowland (2016–present)	
Jolly Trolley	1993	Mickey's Toontown (1993–2003)									Mickey's Toontown (1996–2009)			
Journey Into Imagination With Figment	1983				Imagination Pavilion – As Journey Into Imagination (1983–1998); as Journey Into Your Imagination (1999–2001); Journey Into Imagination With Figment (2002–present)									
Journey into Narnia: Creating The Lion, the Witch, and the Wardrobe	2005					Animation Courtyard (2005–2008)								
Journey into Narnia: Prince Caspian	2008					Animation Courtyard (2008–2011)								
Journey to the Center of the Earth	2001										Mysterious Island (2001–present)			
Journey of Water	2023				World Nature									
Jumpin' Jellyfish	2001		Paradise Pier (2001–2018); Paradise Gardens Park (2018–present)								Mermaid Lagoon (2001–present)			
Jungle Cruise	1955	Adventureland (1955–present)		Adventureland (1971–present)						Adventureland (1983–present)		Adventureland – As Jungle River Cruise (2005–present)		
Kali River Rapids	1999						Asia (1999–present)							
Kilimanjaro Safaris	1998						Africa (1998–present)							
King Arthur Carrousel	1955	Fantasyland (1955–present)												
King Triton's Carousel of the Sea	2001		Paradise Pier (2001–2018)											
King Triton's Concert	2001										Mermaid Lagoon (2001–present)			
Kitchen Kabaret	1982				The Land (1982–1994)									
The Lair of the Dragon	1992							Fantasyland (1992–present)						
Land, The	1982				Future World (1982–2021) World Nature (2021–present)									
Laserphonic Fantasy	1984				World Showcase (1984–1988)									
The Legend of Captain Jack Sparrow	2012					Animation Courtyard (2012–2014)								
The Legend of the Lion King	1994		Paradise Gardens Park (as Tale of the Lion King) (2019–present)	Fantasyland (1994–2002)				Discoveryland (2004–2009) / Frontierland (2019–present)						
Legends of the Wild West	1993							Frontierland (1993–present)						
Liberty Arcade	1992							Main Street, U.S.A (1992–present)						
Light Magic	1997	Main Street, U.S.A. (1997)												
Lights, Motors, Action! Extreme Stunt Show	2002					Streets of America (2005–2016)			Backlot (2002–2019) Production Courtyard (2020) – As Moteurs...Action! Stunt Show Spectacular (2002–present)					
Lightning McQueen's Racing Academy	2019					Sunset Boulevard (2019–2024)								
The Little Mermaid: Ariel's Undersea Adventure	2011		Paradise Gardens Park (2011–present)	Fantasyland – as Under the Sea: Journey of The Little Mermaid (2012–present)										
Lion King Celebration, The	1994	(1994–1997)												
Listen to the Land	1982				The Land (1982–1993)									
The Living Seas	1986				Future World (1986–2005)									
Living with the Land	1982				The Land – As Listen to the Land (1982–1993); as Living with the Land (1993–present)									
Luigi's Flying Tires	2012		Cars Land (2012–2015)											
Luigi's Rollickin' Roadsters	2016		Cars Land (2016–present)											

== M – O ==
Attraction	Opening Year	Disneyland Resort		Walt Disney World Resort				Disneyland Paris		Tokyo Disney Resort		Hong Kong Disneyland Resort	Shanghai Disney Resort	Disneyland Resort Abu Dhabi
Attraction	Opening Year	Disneyland	Disney California Adventure	Magic Kingdom	Epcot	Disney's Hollywood Studios	Disney's Animal Kingdom	Disneyland Park (Paris)	Disney Adventure World	Tokyo Disneyland	Tokyo DisneySea	Hong Kong Disneyland	Shanghai Disneyland	Disneyland Abu Dhabi
Mad T Party	2012		Hollywood Land (2012–2014; 2015–2016)											
Mad Tea Party	1955	Fantasyland (1955–present)		Fantasyland (1971–present)				Fantasyland (1992–present)		Fantasyland (1986–present)		Fantasyland (2005–present)		
Maelstrom	1988				Norway Pavilion (1988–2014)									
Magic Carpets of Aladdin	2001			Adventureland (2001–present)					Toon Studio (2002–2025); World Premiere Plaza, As Flying Carpets over Agrabah (2002–present)		Arabian Cost, As Jasmine's Flying Carpets (2011–present)			
Magic Journeys	1982	Tomorrowland (1984–1986)		Fantasyland (1987–1993)	Future World (1982–1986)									
Magic Over Disney	2022								See "We Love Mickey!"					
Magic of Disney Animation, The	1989		See "Disney Animation"			(1989-2015; 2026)			See "Art of Disney Animation"			See "Art of Animation"		
Magical	2009	(2009–2014)												
Maharajah Jungle Trek	1999						Asia (1999–present)							
Main Street Cinema	1955	Main Street, U.S.A. (1955–present)		Main Street, USA (1971–1998)						World Bazaar (1983–2002)				
Main Street Electrical Parade (a.k.a. Disney's Electrical Parade & Tokyo Disneyland Electrical Parade: DreamLights)	1972	(1972–1996; 2017; 2019; 2022)	(2001–2010)	(1979–1991, 1999–2001, 2010–2016)				(1992–2003)		(1985–1995, 2001–present)				
Main Street Flower Mart	1955	Main Street, USA (1955–1995)												
Mainstreet Quartet, The								See "Dapper Dans, The"						
Making of Me, The	1989				Wonders of Life (1989–2007)									
Maliboomer	2001		Paradise Pier (2001–2010)											
The Many Adventures of Winnie the Pooh (see also Pooh's Hunny Hunt)	1999	Critter Country (2003–present)		Fantasyland (1999–present)								Fantasyland (2005–present)	Fantasyland (2016–present)	
Mark Twain Riverboat	1955	Frontierland (1955–present)		Liberty Square (as Liberty Belle Riverboat, 1971–2025)				Frontierland (as Thunder Mesa Riverboat Landing, 1992–present)		Westernland (1983–present)				
Marvel Universe a.k.a. Super Hero HQ	2015	Tomorrowland (2015–2016)	Hollywood Land (2017–present)										Gardens of Imagination (2016–present)	
Mater's Junkyard Jamboree	2012		Cars Land (2012–present)											
Matterhorn Bobsleds	1959	Fantasyland (1959–present)					Asia (as Expedition Everest: Legend of The Forbidden Mountain) (2006–present)							
Mexico Pavilion	1982				World Showcase (1982–present)									
Mickey's House	1988	Mickey's Toontown (1993–present)		Mickey's Toontown Fair (1988–2011)						Toontown		Main Street, USA (2008–2009)		
Mickey Mania	1994			(1994–1996)						(1995)				
Mickey Mouse Clubhouse Live!	2025		Hollywood Land			The Walt Disney Studios Lot								
Mickey Mouse Club Theater, The		See "Fantasyland Theater (cinema)"												
Mickey Mouse Revue	1971			Fantasyland (1971–1980)						Fantasyland (1983–2009)				
Mickey's Film Festival	2016												Mickey Avenue (2016–present)	
Mickey's Fun Wheel	2008		Paradise Pier (2008–2018)											
Mickey's Jammin' Jungle Parade	2001						Africa, Discovery Island, Asia (2001–2014)							
Mickey & Minnie's Runaway Railway	2020	Mickey's Toontown (2023–present)				Hollywood Boulevard (2020–present)								
Mickey's Mix Magic	2019	See "We Love Mickey!"												
Mickey's PhilharMagic	2003		Hollywood Land (2019–present)	Fantasyland (2003–present)				Discoveryland / Mickey's PhilharMagic: (Mickey et son Orchestre Philharmagique) (2018–present)		Fantasyland (2011–present)		Fantasyland (2005–present)		
Mickey's Royal Friendship Faire	2016			Cinderella Castle (2016–present)										
Midget Autopia	1957	Fantasyland (1957–1966)												
Mike Fink Keel Boats	1955	Frontierland (1955–1997)		Liberty Square (1971–2001)				Frontierland (1992–2010)						
Millennium Falcon: Smugglers Run	2019	Star Wars: Galaxy's Edge (2019–present)				Star Wars: Galaxy's Edge (2019–present)								
Millennium Village	1999				World Showcase (1999–2001)									
Minnie's House	1988	Mickey's Toontown (1993–present)		Mickey's Toontown Fair (1988–2011)						Toontown (1996–present)				
Minnie's Style Studio	2020									Mickey's Toontown (2020–present)				
Mission: Space	2003				Future World (2003–2021); World Discovery (2021–present)									
Mission: Space Advanced Training Lab	2003				Future World (2003–2021); World Discovery (2021–present)									
Mission to Mars	1975	Tomorrowland (1975–1992)		Tomorrowland (1975–1993)										
Miss Fritter's Daredevil Spin-Along	2028			Piston Peak National Park (Opening in 2028)										
Monsanto House of the Future, aka Home of the Future	1957	Tomorrowland (1957–1967)												
Monsters, Inc. Door Coaster	TBA					Monstropolis								
Monsters, Inc. Laugh Floor	2007			Tomorrowland (2007–present)										
Monsters, Inc. Mike & Sulley to the Rescue!	2006		Hollywood Land (2006–present)											
Monsters, Inc. Ride & Go Seek	2009									Tomorrowland (2009–present)				
Morocco Pavilion	1982				World Showcase (1982–present)									
Motor Boat Cruise	1957	Fantasyland (1957–1993)												
Mr. Toad's Wild Ride	1955	Fantasyland (1955–present)		Fantasyland (1971–1998)										
Mulholland Madness	2001		Paradise Pier (2001–2010)											
Muppet*Vision 3D	1991		Hollywood Land (2001–2014)			Streets of America (1991–2016); Muppets Courtyard (2016–2017); Grand Avenue (2017–2025)								
The Mysteries of the Nautilus	1994							Discoveryland (1994–present)						
Mystic Manor	2013							Frontierland (as Phantom Manor) (1992–present)				Mystic Point (2013–present)		
Nature's Wonderland	1956	Frontierland (1956–1977)												
Na'vi River Journey	2017						Pandora – The World of Avatar (2017–present)							
Nemo & Friends SeaRider	2017			Fantasyland (2006 – April 2007)							Port Discovery (2017–present)			
New Global Neighborhood	1999				Future World (1999–2004) (converted from "Global Neighborhood")									
New World Fantasy, A	1983				World Showcase (1983–1984)									
Norway Pavilion	1988				World Showcase (1988–present)									
O Canada!	1982				Canada Pavilion (1982–2019)									
Once Upon a Time	2014			(2016–2020)						(2014–2017)				
"Once Upon a Time" Adventure	2016												Fantasyland (2016–present)	
One Man's Dream II: The Magic Lives On	2004									Tomorrowland (2004–2019)				
Orange Stinger	2001		Paradise Pier (2001–2010)											
Orbitron	2005											Tomorrowland (2005–present)		

== P – S ==
Attraction	Opening Year	Disneyland Resort		Walt Disney World Resort				Disneyland Paris		Tokyo Disney Resort		Hong Kong Disneyland Resort	Shanghai Disney Resort	Disneyland Resort Abu Dhabi
Attraction	Opening Year	Disneyland	Disney California Adventure	Magic Kingdom	Epcot	Disney's Hollywood Studios	Disney's Animal Kingdom	Disneyland Park (Paris)	Disney Adventure World	Tokyo Disneyland	Tokyo DisneySea	Hong Kong Disneyland	Shanghai Disneyland	Disneyland Abu Dhabi
Paint the Night	2014	(2015–2017)	(2018)									(2014–2020)		
PeopleMover (a.k.a. Tomorrowland Transit Authority PeopleMover)	1967	Tomorrowland (1967–1995)		Tomorrowland (1975–present)										
Peter Pan's Flight	1955	Fantasyland (1955–present)		Fantasyland (1971–2006) (2006-2024) (2024-present)				Fantasyland (1992–present)		Fantasyland (1983–present)			Fantasyland (2016–present)	
Peter Pan's Never Land Adventure	2024										Fantasy Springs (2024–present)			
Phantom Boats	1955	Tomorrowland (1955)												
Phantom Manor	1992							Frontierland (1992–present)						
Pinocchio's Daring Journey	1983	Fantasyland (1983–present)						Fantasyland (1992–present)		Fantasyland (1983–present)				
Pirates Arcade Museum	1967	New Orleans Square (1967–1980)		Adventureland (as The Pirates Arcade Museum) (1974–1980)										
Pirates of the Caribbean	1967	New Orleans Square (1967–present)		Adventureland (1973–present)				Adventureland (1992–present)		Adventureland (1983–present)			Treasure Cove (2016–present)	
Pirates of the Caribbean: Battle for the Sunken Treasure	2016												Treasure Cove (2016–present)	
Pirates Lair on Tom Sawyer Island	2007	Frontierland (2007–present)												
Pixar Adventurous Journey	2025												Tomorrowland (2025–present)	
Pixar Pal-A-Round	2018		(2018–present)											
Pixar Play Parade	2008	(2018)	(2008–2011, 2012–2017, 2018)			Pixar Pals: Countdown to Fun (2011–2013)								
Pixie Hollow	2008	Fantasyland (2008–present)		Mickey's Toontown Fair (2008–2011); Adventureland (2011–2014)								Fantasyland (2011–2015) (2015–present)		
PLAY! Pavilion	2024				World Discovery									
Pocahontas and her Forest Friends	1998						Camp Minnie-Mickey (1998–2008)							
Pooh's Hunny Hunt	2000									Fantasyland (2000–present)				
Pooh's Playful Spot	2005			Fantasyland (2005–2010)										
Primeval Whirl	2002						DinoLand U.S.A. (2002–2020)							
Prince Charming Regal Carrousel, aka Castle Carrousel, Cinderella Carousel, Cinderella's Golden Carrousel	1971			Fantasyland (as Cinderella's Golden Carrousel or Prince Charming Regal Carrousel) (1971–2010)						Fantasyland (as Castle Carrousel) (1983–present)		Fantasyland (as Cinderella Carousel) (2005–present)	Gardens of Imagination (as Fantasia Carousel) (2016–present)	
Princess Dot Puddle Park	2002		A Bug's Land (2002–2018)											
Project Tomorrow: Inventing the Wonders of the Future	1998	Tomorrowland (1998–2015) (A exhibit inside Innoventions)			Future World (2005–2021); World Celebration (2021–present)									
Radiator Springs Racers	2012		Cars Land (2012–present)											
Rafiki's Planet Watch	1998						Rafiki's Planet Watch (1998–present)							
Raging Spirits	2005										Lost River Delta (2005–present)			
Rainbow Caverns Mine Train	1956	Frontierland (1956–1960)												
Rainbow Ridge Pack Mules	1955	Frontierland (1955–1973)												
Raiponce Tangled Spin	2026								Adventure Way					
Rapunzel's Lantern Festival	2024										Fantasy Springs (2024–present)			
Reach for the Stars	2024									World Bazaar (2024-Present)				
Remy's Ratatouille Adventure AKA Ratatouille: L’Aventure Totalement Toquée de Rémy	2014				World Showcase (France Pavilion) (as Remy's Ratatouille Adventure, 2021–present)				Toon Studio, World of Pixar (2014–present)					
RC Racer	2010					Toy Story Land			Toy Story Playland (2010–present)			Toy Story Land (2011–present)	Disney·Pixar Toy Story Land (2018–present)	
Red Car Trolley	2012		Buena Vista Street; Hollywood Land (2012–2025)											
Redwood Creek Challenge Trail	2001		Grizzly Peak (2001–present)											
Reflections of China	2003				World Showcase (China Pavilion) (2003–present)									
Remember... Dreams Come True	2005	(2005–2009; 2010–2014; 2017–2018; 2018–2019)												
Rivers of Adventure	2005											Adventureland (2005–present)		
Rivers of America (a.k.a. Rivers of the Far West)	1955	Frontierland (1955–present)		Frontierland (1971–present)				Frontierland (1992–present)		Westernland (1983–present)				
Rivers of Light	2017						Asia (2017–2020)							
Roaring Rapids	2016												Adventure Isle (2016–present)	
Rock 'n' Roller Coaster starring Aerosmith	1999					Sunset Boulevard (1999–2026)			Backlot (2002–2019)					
Rock 'n' Roller Coaster Starring The Muppets	2026					Sunset Boulevard								
Rocket Jets		See "Astro Orbiter"												
Rocket Rods	1998	Tomorrowland (1998–2000)												
Rocket to the Moon		See "Flight to the Moon"												
Roger Rabbit's Car Toon Spin	1994	Mickey's Toontown (1994–present)								Toontown (1996–present)				
Sailing Ship Columbia	1958	Frontierland (1958–present)												
Scuttle's Scooters	2001										Mermaid Lagoon (2001–present)			
The Seas	2007				Future World (2007–2021); World Nature (2021–present)									
Seas with Nemo & Friends, The	2007				Future World, The Seas (2007–2021); World Nature, The Seas (2021–present)									
Seven Dwarfs Mine Train	2014			Fantasyland (2014–present)									Fantasyland (2016–present)	
Share A Dream Come True Parade	2001			(2001–2014)										
Shipwreck Shore	2016												Treasure Cove (2016–present)	
Silly Symphony Swings	2010		Paradise Gardens Park (2010–present)											
Sinbad's Storybook Voyage	2001										Arabian Coast; Sinbad's Seven Voyages (2001–2007); Sinbad's Storybook Voyage (2007–present)			
Siren's Revenge	2016												Treasure Cove (2016–present)	
Skyway	1956	Fantasyland to Tomorrowland (1956–1994)		Fantasyland to Tomorrowland (1971–1999)						Fantasyland to Tomorrowland (1983–1998)				
Sleeping Beauty Castle	1955	Fantasyland (1955–present)						Fantasyland (as Le Château de la Belle au Bois Dormant) (1992–present)				Fantasyland (2005–2018)		
Slinky Dog Dash	2018					Toy Story Land (2018–present)								
Slinky Dog Zig Zag Spin	2010					Toy Story Land (as Slinky Dog Dash) (2018–present)			Toy Story Playland (2010–present)			Toy Story Land (2011–present)	Disney·Pixar Toy Story Land (2018–present)	
Smellephants on Parade	2024			Fantasyland (2024—present)										
Snow White Grotto	1961	Fantasyland (1961–present)								Fantasyland (1983–present)		Fantasyland (2005–present)		
Snow White's Scary Adventures	1955	Fantasyland (1955–present)		Fantasyland (1971–2012)				Fantasyland (1992–present)		Fantasyland (1983–present)				
Soarin' (Formerly Soarin Over California)	2001		Grizzly Peak (as Soarin': Around the World) (2001–present)		Future World, The Land (as Soarin'; 2005–2016); Future World, The Land (as Soarin': Around the World; 2016–present); World Nature, The Land (as Soarin: Around the World; 2021–present)						Mediterranean Harbor (as Soaring: Fantastic Flight, 2019–present)		Adventure Isle (as Soaring Over The Horizon, 2016–present)	
Sorcerers of the Magic Kingdom	2012			Main Street, USA, Adventureland, Frontierland, Liberty Square, & Fantasyland (2012–2021)										
Sounds Dangerous!	1999					Echo Lake (1999–2012)								
Space Mountain	1975	Tomorrowland (1977–present)		Tomorrowland (1975–present)				Discoveryland (Star Wars Hyperspace Mountain, 1995–present)		Tomorrowland (1983–2024)		Tomorrowland (Hyperspace Mountain, 2005–present)		
Space Mountain Ghost Galaxy	2007	Tomorrowland (2009–2018)										Tomorrowland (2007–2013)		
Space Station X-1	1955	Tomorrowland (1955–1960)												
Spaceship Earth	1982				Future World (1982–2021); World Celebration (2021–present)									
Spirit of Pocahontas, The	1995	Fantasyland (1995–1997)				Backlot Theater (1995–1996)								
SpectroMagic	1991			Main Street, USA (1991–1999, 2001–2010)										
Splash Mountain	1989	Critter Country (1989–2023)		Frontierland (1992–2023)						Critter Country (1992–present)				
S.S. Rustworthy	2001		Paradise Pier (2001–2010)											
Stark Flight Lab	2028		Avengers Campus (Opening in 2028)											
Star Jets				See "Astro Orbiter"						See "Astro Orbiter"				
Star Tours	1987	Tomorrowland (1987–2010)				Echo Lake (1989–2010)		Discoveryland (1992–2016)		Tomorrowland (1989–2012)				
Star Wars: A Galactic Spectacular	2016					(2016–2020)			(2017–2020)					
Star Wars: Path of the Jedi	2015	Tomorrowland (2015–2018, 2019–2020)				Echo Lake (2015–2019)		Discoveryland (2017–2018)					Tomorrowland (2016–2019)	
Star Tours – The Adventures Continue	2011	Tomorrowland (2011–present)				Echo Lake (2011–present)		Discoveryland (2017–present)		Tomorrowland (2013–present)				
Star Wars Launch Bay	2015	Tomorrowland (2015–2020)				Animation Courtyard (2015–2025)							Tomorrowland (2016–2019)	
Star Wars: Rise of the Resistance	2019	Star Wars: Galaxy's Edge (2020–present)				Star Wars: Galaxy's Edge (2019–present)								
Stitch Encounter (a.k.a. Stitch Live!, Space Chat with Stitch)	2008								Production Courtyard (2008–2025); Walt Disney Studios Television (2008–2019); World Premiere Plaza (2025); Studio D (2021–present)	Tomorrowland (2015–present)		Tomorrowland (2006–2016); The Pavilion (2019)	Tomorrowland (2016–2025; 2025–present)	
Stitch's Great Escape!	2004			Tomorrowland (2004–2018)										
StormRider	2001										Port Discovery (2001–2016)			
Storybook Land Canal Boats	1955	Fantasyland; Canal Boats of the World (1955); Storybook Land Canal Boats (1956–present)						Fantasyland (1994–present)						
Studio Backlot Tour	1989					Streets of America (1989–2014)			see "Studio Tram Tour: Behind the Magic"					
Studio Tram Tour: Behind the Magic	2002								Production Courtyard (2002–2020)					
Submarine Voyage	1959	Tomorrowland (1959–1998)												
Sugar Rush: Sweet Rescue	2027									Tomorrowland (Opening in Spring 2027)				
Superstar Limo	2001		Hollywood Pictures Backlot (2001–2002)											
Swiss Family Treehouse	1960	Adventureland (1960–1999)		Adventureland (1971–present)				Adventureland (1992–present)		Adventureland (1993–present)				
Symbiosis	1982				The Land (1982–1995)									

== T – Z ==
Attraction	Opening Year	Disneyland Resort		Walt Disney World Resort				Disneyland Paris		Tokyo Disney Resort		Hong Kong Disneyland Resort	Shanghai Disney Resort	Disneyland Resort Abu Dhabi
Attraction	Opening Year	Disneyland	Disney California Adventure	Magic Kingdom	Epcot	Disney's Hollywood Studios	Disney's Animal Kingdom	Disneyland Park (Paris)	Disney Adventure World	Tokyo Disneyland	Tokyo DisneySea	Hong Kong Disneyland	Shanghai Disneyland	Disneyland Abu Dhabi
Tahitian Terrace	1962	Adventureland (1962–1993)												
Take Flight				See "Delta Dreamflight"										
Tapestry of Nations	1999				World Showcase (1999–2001)									
Tarzan's Treehouse	1999	Adventureland (1999–2021)										Adventureland (2005–present)		
Test Track	1999				Future World (1999–2021); World Discovery (2021–present)									
The Timekeeper	1992			Tomorrowland (1994–2006)				Discoveryland (1992–2004)		Tomorrowland (1993–2002)				
The Little Mermaid – A Musical Adventure	2025					Animation Courtyard, The Walt Disney Studios Lot (2025–present)								
The Land of the Lion King, aka Un Land Dédie au Roi Lion	TBA								Pride Lands					
Tiana's Bayou Adventure	2024	Bayou Country (2024–present)		Frontierland (2024–present)										
TOGETHER: a Pixar Musical Adventure	2023								Production Courtyard, World Premiere Plaza (2023–present)					
Together Forever	2018	(2018)												
Tom Sawyer Island (See also Pirate's Lair on Tom Sawyer Island)	1956	Frontierland (1956–present)		Frontierland (1973–2025)						Westernland (1983–present)				
Tomorrowland Indy Speedway				See "Autopia"										
Tomorrowland Jets		See "Astro Orbiter"												
Tomorrowland Speedway				See "Autopia"										
Tomorrowland Transit Authority				See "People Mover"										
Toon Park	1993	Mickey's Toontown (1993–1999)								Mickey's Toontown (1996–present)				
Toy Story Funhouse	1996	Tomorrowland (1996)												
Toy Story Midway Mania!	2008		Paradise Pier (2008–2018); Pixar Pier (2018–present)			Pixar Place (2008–2018); Toy Story Land (2018–present)					American Waterfront (2012–present)			
Toy Soldier Parachute Drop	2010								Toy Story Playland (2010–present)			Toy Story Playland (2011–present)		
The Tree of Life	1998						Discovery Island (1998–present)							
TriceraTop Spin	2001						Dinoland U.S.A. (2001–2025)							
Tron Lightcycle Power Run, aka Tron Lightcycle / Run	2016			Tomorrowland (2023–present)									Tomorrowland (2016–present)	
Tron Realm: Chevrolet Digital Challenge	2016												Tomorrowland (2016–present)	
Tropical Serenade				See "Walt Disney's Enchanted Tiki Room"										
Tuck and Roll's Drive 'Em Buggies	2002		A Bug's Land (2002–2018)											
Turtle Talk with Crush	2004		Hollywood Land (2005–present)		The Seas (2004–present)						American Waterfront (2009–present)	Main Street, U.S.A. (2008)		
The Twilight Zone Tower of Terror	1994		Hollywood Land (2004–2017)			Sunset Boulevard (1994–present)			Production Courtyard, World Premiere Plaza (2007–present)		American Waterfront (as Tower of Terror) (2006–present)			
20,000 Leagues Under the Sea: Submarine Voyage	1971			Fantasyland (1971–1994)										
20,000 Leagues Under the Sea	2001										Mysterious Island (2001–present)			
Under the Sea – Journey of the Little Mermaid, aka The Little Mermaid: Ariel's Undersea Adventure	2011		Paradise Gardens Park (as The Little Mermaid: Ariel's Undersea Adventure) (2011–present)	Fantasyland (2011–present)										
Ultimate Pixar Adventure	2027											Toy Story Land		
United Kingdom Pavilion	1982				World Showcase (1982–present)									
Universe of Energy	1982				Future World (1982–2004)									
Videopolis	1985	Fantasyland (1985–1995)						Discoveryland (1992–present)						
Venetian Gondolas	2001										Mediterranean Harbor (2001–present)			
Viewliner Train of Tomorrow	1957	Tomorrowland (1957–1958)												
Voyage of the Little Mermaid	1992					Animation Courtyard (1992–2020)								
Voyage to the Crystal Grotto	2016												Fantasyland (2016–present)	
Walt Disney's Carousel of Progress				See "Carousel of Progress"										
Walt Disney's Enchanted Tiki Room	1963	Adventureland (1963–present)		Adventureland (1971–present)										
Walt Disney's Parade of Dreams	2005	(2005–2008)												
Walt Disney Imagineering Blue Sky Cellar	2008		Pacific Wharf (2008–2013, 2018–2020)											
Walt Disney Presents	2001					Mickey Avenue, The Walt Disney Studios Lot (2001–present)								
Walt Disney Story, The		Main Street												
Walt Disney Story Featuring Great Moments with Mr. Lincoln, The		See "Great Moments with Mr. Lincoln"												
Disneyland Railroad, aka Walt Disney World Railroad				See "Disneyland Railroad"										
Walt Disney's Enchanted Tiki Room	1963	Adventureland (1963–present)		Adventureland (as Tropical Serenade or Walt Disney's Enchanted Tiki Room) (1971–1998, 2011–present) (see also "Enchanted Tiki Room (Under New Management), The")						Adventureland (1983–1999) (converted to "Enchanted Tiki Room: Now Playing 'Get the Fever!', The")				
Wandering Oaken's Sliding Sleighs	2023											World of Frozen		
Walt Disney — A Magical Life	2025	Main Street, U.S.A.												
We Love Mickey!	2018	Main Street, U.S.A. (as Mickey's Mix Magic) (2019–2023)							Production Courtyard (as Magic Over Disney) (2022–2023)			Main Street, U.S.A. (2018–2022)		
WEDway people mover (aka Tomorrowland Transit Authority)		See People Mover		See People Mover										
Web Slingers: A Spider-Man Adventure, aka Spider-Man W.E.B. Adventure	2021		Avengers Campus (2021–present)						Avengers Campus					
Welcome to Monstropolis	2027					Monstropolis (Opening in 2027)								
Western River Railroad	1983									Adventureland (1983–present)				
Westernland Shootin' Gallery										See "Frontierland Shootin' Arcade"				
The Whirlpool	2001										Mermaid Lagoon (2001–present)			
Who Wants to Be a Millionaire – Play It!	2001		Hollywood Pictures Backlot (2001–2004)			Walt Disney Theatre (2001–2006)								
Wild Africa Trek	2011						Africa (2011–present)							
Wildlife Express Train	1998						Rafiki's Planet Watch (1998–present)							
Wishes: A Magical Gathering of Disney Dreams	2003			(2003–2017)				(2005–2007)						
Wonders of China	1982	Tomorrowland (1984–1996)			World Showcase, China (1982–2003)									
Wonders of Life	1989				Future World (1989–2007)									
Wonders of Xandar Pavilion	2022				World Discovery (2022–present)									
Woody's Round-Up	2018												Toy Story Land (2018–present)	
Woody's Roundup Village	2007							Frontierland (2007–2011)						
Wonderful World of Animation	2019					Hollywood Boulevard (2019–present)								
Wondrous Journeys	2023	Main Street, U.S.A. (2023, 2024)												
World of Color	2010		Paradise Pier (2010–2018); Paradise Gardens Park (2018–present)											
World of Motion	1982				Future World (1982–1996)									
World According to Goofy, The	1992	Main Street (1992)												
World Beneath Us, The	1955	Tomorrowland (1955–1960)												
World Premiere	2025								Front Lot					
Zootopia: Better Zoogether!	2025						Discovery Island							
Zootopia: Hot Pursuit	2023												Zootopia (2023–present)	

== See also ==
- List of Disney attractions using Audio-Animatronics
- List of lands at Disney theme parks
- List of Disney attractions that were never built
- Rail transport in Walt Disney Parks and Resorts
