= Leaning Tower of Pizza =

Leaning Tower of Pizza may refer to:

- Leaning Tower of Pizza (proposed structure), a proposed skyscraper near Ann Arbor, Michigan
- "Leaning Tower of Pizza", a 2012 episode of Fleabag Monkeyface
- Leaning Tower of Pizza, a nickname of basketball player Charles Barkley
- Leaning Tower of Pizza, an element of The World According to Goofy parade at Disneyland
- The Leaning Tower of Pizza, the working title for the 2023 game Pizza Tower
