= List of former Disneyland attractions =

Disneyland is a theme park in Anaheim, California conceived by Walt Disney. This is a list of attractions – rides, shows, shops and parades – that have appeared at the park but have permanently closed. Character meets and atmosphere entertainment (e.g., roving musicians) are not listed. Also not listed are permanently closed attractions from Disney California Adventure.

== Main Street, USA ==
Maxwell House operated on Main Street, U.S.A. from 1955 to 1957

- Hollywood-Maxwell's Intimate Apparel Shop (1955–1956): Featuring the "Wizard of Bras"
- Maxwell House Coffee House (1955–1957)
- Main Street Shooting Gallery (1955–1962): A shooting gallery themed to the 1920s
- Main Street Flower Market (1955–1977): A large display of plastic flowers: "The world's finest natural flowers not grown by nature"
- Disneyland Branch of Bank of America (1955–1993): A Bank of America with three ATMs to use
- Story Book Shop (1955–1995): A book shop operated by Western Publishing
- Babes in Toyland Exhibit (1961–1963): Utilizing the sets from Disney's 1961 film Babes in Toyland, this walk-through attraction occupied the Opera House near the park's entrance.
- Legacy of Walt Disney (1901-1966): A museum showing exhibits on how Walt Disney changed the world
- Disneyland Presents a Preview of Coming Attractions (1973–1989): A preview center for up-coming attractions
- Bank of Main Street U.S.A. (1993–2005)
- Annual Passholder Center (2005–2009)

=== Main Street Opera House shows ===
The Main Street Opera House has housed the following shows:

- Great Moments with Mr. Lincoln (1965–1973): Theater presentation featuring an Audio-Animatronics figure of Abraham Lincoln, a replica of a similar attraction at the 1964 New York World's Fair. Elements of the original show were incorporated into later versions of the attraction from 1975 to 2004 and from 2009–2024.
- The Walt Disney Story (1973–1975): Biographical film about Walt Disney, which originally appeared at Walt Disney World in 1972.
- The Walt Disney Story featuring Great Moments with Mr. Lincoln (1975–2004): A combination of the two previous shows. Disneyland had been criticized for replacing the Lincoln tribute with a tribute to Walt Disney, and combined elements of the two shows in response. From 2001 to 2004 the Disney tribute was removed, and the entire show was given more of a focus on the American Civil War.
- Disneyland: The First 50 Magical Years (2005–2009): An exhibition on the history of Disneyland, including a film narrated by Steve Martin.

== Adventureland ==
- Tahitian Terrace (1962–1993): Dinner show with various Polynesian entertainment. Replaced by:

- Aladdin's Oasis (1993–1995, 1997–2008): Dinner show based on Disney Animation's 1992 film Aladdin. The dinner show ended in 1995 and the stage show was brought back in 1997–2008.

- Big Game Safari Shooting Gallery (1962–1982): A jungle-themed shooting gallery with images of wild animals as the targets.
- Swiss Family Treehouse (1962–1999): A Treehouse walk-through attraction based on the 1960 film Swiss Family Robinson. Rethemed as Tarzan's Treehouse in 1999.

- Tarzan's Treehouse (1999–2021): A Treehouse walk-through attraction based on Disney Animation's 1999 film, Tarzan. Rethemed to Adventureland Treehouse in 2023.

== New Orleans Square ==
- The Disney Gallery (1987–2007): A gallery of Disney-related art. The Disney Gallery was the only area listed on Disneyland maps as both an attraction and a retail location. The Gallery sometimes featured preliminary artwork and sketches from certain attractions or movies, sometimes (as in the 100 Mickeys exhibit) the displayed art was associated only with Disney and not with any specific attraction, film, or event. Often, prints from the exhibit were available for purchase via the print-on-demand system, and the Gallery always featured items such as books about Disney artwork. The Gallery used to sell prints of the ride posters featured in the tunnels leading to and from Main Street. The former gallery was replaced by the Disneyland Dream Suite. In October 2009 the gallery re-opened, but now it resides on Main Street, U.S.A.
- Disneyland Dream Suite (2008–2014): A 2,200-square-foot (200 m2) luxury apartment. It was created as part of the "Year of a Million Dreams" promotion that ran from October 1, 2006, through December 31, 2008.

== Frontierland ==
- Golden Horseshoe Revue (1955–1986): A musical comedy show featuring Sluefoot-Sue (Betty Taylor), an Irish Tenor (Fulton Burley) and a traveling Salesman (Wally Boag) along with Can-Can girls. An extremely popular show, it ran in the Golden Horseshoe Saloon nearly unchanged for about three decades.
- Golden Horseshoe Jamboree (1986–1994): An Old West show featuring singing, dancing, joke-telling, banjo playing, and general fun and rowdiness, starring Miss Lilly, Sam the Bartender and a gang of cowpunchers.
- Golden Horseshoe Variety Show (1986–2003): A variety show featuring comedian/musician Dana Daniels and Luigi, his psychic parrot. This shared the Golden Horseshoe Saloon with Billy Hill and the Hillbillies.
- All-New Woody's Roundup (1999–2000): A live-action show featuring characters from Pixar's 1999 film Toy Story 2.
- Billy Hill and the Hillbillies (1994–2014): A live-action show featuring singing and comedy. In 2012 the musical/variety group moved to Big Thunder Ranch until their show was retired in early 2014. Afterward, they were hired by Knott's Berry Farm as Krazy Kirk and the Hillbillies.
- Davy Crockett Museum (1955–1956): Mostly given over to retail space, with a few exhibits detailing scenes from the television series of the same name.
  Frontierland stagecoach and pack mule rides, 1955, featuring Walt Disney
- Pack Mules (1955–1956): Real mules which were ridden in a line to view simulated frontierlands and deserts. After renovations and upgrades, the ride was renamed:

- Rainbow Ridge Pack Mules (1956–1959)
- Pack Mules Through Nature's Wonderland (1960–1973); in 1979, Big Thunder Mountain Railroad and Big Thunder Ranch replaced Nature's Wonderland.

- Stage Coach (1955–1956): A real stagecoach drawn by real horses. After new scenic landscaping, it became Rainbow Mountain Stage Coaches (1956–1960).
- Conestoga Wagons (1955–1960): A real Conestoga wagon drawn by real animals.
- Rainbow Caverns Mine Train (1956–1959): A 2 ft 6 in (762 mm) narrow gauge mine train attraction through the new Living Desert. After the scenery was again redone in 1960, it was also upgraded and became:

- Mine Train Through Nature's Wonderland (1960–1977): The Big Thunder Mountain Railroad attraction replaced this sedate train ride with a roller coaster version due to the fact that attendance had dropped for the original mine train ride and there was a need for more thrill rides at Disneyland. The only element that remained in place from its scenic vistas was the waterfall tumbling from Cascade Peak into the Rivers of America, visible from various boat rides around the Rivers. The structure that formed Cascade Peak and its waterfalls was demolished in 1998 after it was found to be suffering structurally from the decades of water that had flowed over it. One of the four locomotives and two cars from the ride remained on a stretch of track where Cascade peak once stood, as a staged wreck scene. The train, however, was removed in early 2010 during the Rivers of America refurbishment.

- Mineral Hall (1956–1963): Mineral Hall was a shop located next door to the Rainbow Caverns Mine Train/Mine Train through Nature's Wonderland ride. Operated by Ultra-Violet Products, the Mineral Hall featured a free exhibit, which included a mineral display lit by black-light. The shop also sold related gifts and mineral samples. Selling anywhere between 10 and 50 cents, the Disneyland-themed mineral samples were labeled "Walt Disney's Mineral Land – Rocks & Minerals".
- Indian War Canoes (1956–1971): Now Davy Crockett's Explorer Canoes, and part of Bayou Country.
- Huckleberry Finn's Fishing Pier (1956–1965): located on Tom Sawyer Island, guests were able to rent fishing poles and fish for real Catfish, Bluegill, River Perch and Trout at Catfish Cove. The fish were held in a hidden underwater net pen, and guests could have park staff clean any fish they caught and store them in a refrigerator until they were ready to leave the park. The "take-home" option was discontinued just weeks after the attraction opened, as many guests chose not to have their fish cleaned and refrigerated, instead taking them into the park and on rides in the special "fish totes" provided by staff for use in carrying cleaned and chilled fish home. Many of these guests ended up abandoning their catch in bushes, trash cans, lockers, etc. Guests continued to be able to practice catch-and-release fishing for some time afterwards, until the attraction was eventually scrapped altogether. The raised stage used for the Fantasmic! show now occupies the space above where the fish pen was once submerged.

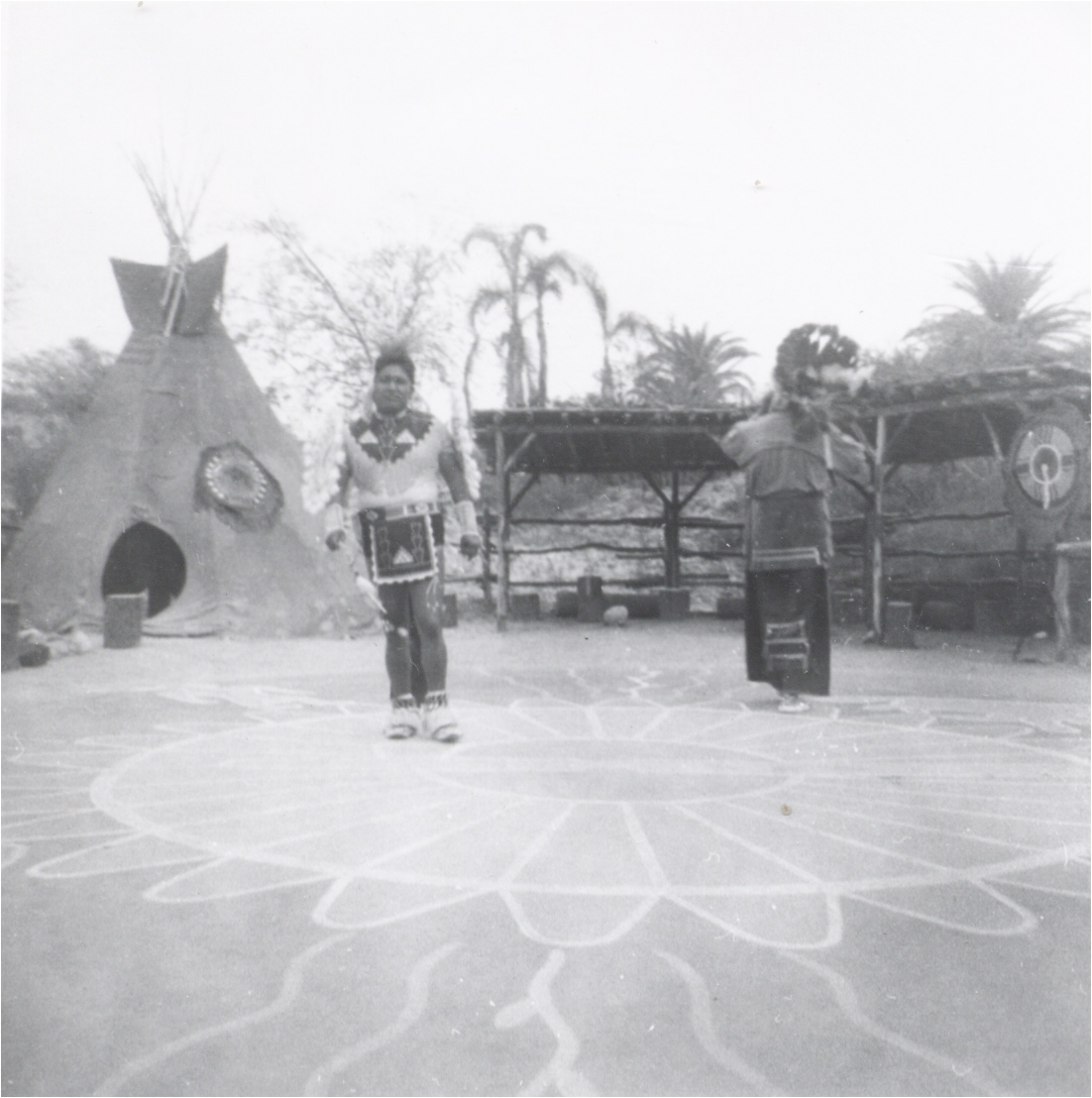
A Native American cast member at the Indian Village in 1955

- Indian Village (1955–1971): Originally in Frontierland, it moved to the other side of the Rivers of America in 1956. "The Indian Village featured authentic dwellings, craft demonstrations, ceremonial dances, and the Indian War Canoes attraction." Now part of Bayou Country.
- Big Thunder Ranch (1986–2016): A Western-themed casual area for seeing shows, viewing Disneyland's horses on their breaks and days off, and dining at Big Thunder Barbecue which served ribs, chicken, potatoes, beans, and such. The Barbecue remained open for a few more years after the Ranch area became the Festival of Fools stage for The Hunchback of Notre Dame show. Up until its closing, the area was used for special events, a Petting Zoo, and seasonal attractions. It closed in early 2016 for Star Wars: Galaxy's Edge.
- Mike Fink Keel Boats (1956–1994, 1996–1997): Shut down due to an accident in 1997 when the Gullywhumper boat began rocking side-to-side on a trip on the Rivers of America and capsized. The attraction never returned. The Gullywhumper's sister boat, the Bertha Mae, was sold on Disney's auctions site. In 2003, the Gullywhumper returned to the Rivers of America as a prop and is moored on Tom Sawyer Island, where it is visible from the Mark Twain Riverboat, the Sailing Ship Columbia, and the Explorer Canoes.
- Little Patch of Heaven Petting Farm (2004–2005): Petting zoo located at Big Thunder Ranch to promote Disney Animation's 2004 film Home on the Range.

== Bayou Country ==
Bear Country opened in 1972. It was renamed Critter Country in 1988, and in 2024 it was renamed Bayou Country.

- Country Bear Jamboree (1972–1986): An Audio-Animatronics show featuring traditional American folk songs sung by a variety of bears and their friends. The content of the show was replaced by Country Bear Vacation Hoedown at the Country Bear Playhouse (1986–2001): Used the same bear figures as Country Bear Jamboree, with new costumes. This is now the site of The Many Adventures of Winnie the Pooh.
- The Mile-Long Bar (1972–1988): A snack bar fashioned like an old-west wooden bar with brass footrail and featuring wall-sized mirrors at either end. Later became Brer Bar and is now the site of the expanded Pooh Corner store (formerly Crocodile Mercantile).
- Teddi Barra's Swinging Arcade (1972–2003): Video arcade, now the site of the expanded Pooh Corner store.
- Splash Mountain (1989–2023): A log flume ride based on the animated sequences of Disney's 1946 film Song of the South. Was rethemed to Tiana's Bayou Adventure.

== Fantasyland ==
- Mickey Mouse Club Theater (1955–1964): Walk-in theater continuously showing animated Disney films and shorts, similar to the Main Street Cinema. Renamed Fantasyland Theater (1964–1982); not to be confused with the present-day theater). Now the site of Pinocchio's Daring Journey.
- Mickey Mouse Club Circus (1955–1956): A circus arts show featuring actual cast members of the Mickey Mouse Club, live animals with Professor George J. Keller's Jungle Killers, Bob-O the Disneyland Clown and the talking equine, The Wonder Horse!
- Keller's Jungle Killers (1956)
- Merlin's Magic Shop (1955–1983): The original magic shop in the park. A second one on Main Street, U.S.A. opened in 1957
- Skyway to Tomorrowland (1956–1994): This ride, a typical aerial lift ride seen in many parks, traveled from a chalet on the west side of Fantasyland, through the Matterhorn, to a station in Tomorrowland. Cabins hung from cables and ran constantly back and forth between the two lands. The Fantasyland station stood until 2016 – closed to public access – adjacent to the Casey Jr. Circus Train, and was concealed by trees. It was demolished for Star Wars: Galaxy's Edge construction. Its support towers were removed and the holes in the Matterhorn through which the ride passed were filled in.
- Junior Autopia (1956–1958): A version of the original Autopia geared towards children. The Junior Autopia featured a guide rail, which the original version of Autopia did not have at the time. The site of the Junior Autopia reopened a year later as the Fantasyland Autopia and is now part of the present-day Autopia.
- Midget Autopia (1957–1966): A version of the original Autopia geared towards young children. After the Midget Autopia closed, the ride was dismantled and sent to Walt Disney's hometown of Marceline, Missouri, where it operated for a few years. The site of the Midget Autopia is now the main walkway between It's a Small World and the rest of Fantasyland.
- Fantasyland Autopia (1959–1999): A version of the original Autopia, built on the site of the former Junior Autopia. The Fantasyland Autopia was known as the "Rescue Ranger Raceway" and themed to the Chip 'n Dale Rescue Rangers television series from 1991 to 1993. Its name reverted to "Fantasyland Autopia" afterwards, and operated part-time until it permanently closed in 1999. Its track was combined with the track of the Tomorrowland Autopia to create the present-day Autopia.
- Skull Rock and Pirate's Cove (1961–1982): A dining experience themed to Captain Hook's pirate ship. Dumbo the Flying Elephant was relocated to the former location of Skull Rock and Pirate's Cove and reopened there in 1983.
- Motor Boat Cruise (1957–1991): Simulated experience of navigating waterways in a motor boat. Renamed Motor Boat Cruise to Gummi Glen (1991–1993), based on the Gummi Bears television show.
- Videopolis (1985–1995): A nighttime dance club targeted at young adults. Videopolis featured television monitors playing modern music videos and also hosted live musical acts. It also featured a snack bar, "Yumz". Videopolis was converted into an amphitheatre in 1990 and was renamed Fantasyland Theatre in 1995.

=== Videopolis/Fantasyland Theatre shows ===
- One Man's Dream: Stage show about Walt Disney
- Dick Tracy: Diamond Double-Cross: Based on the 1990 film Dick Tracy
- Beauty and the Beast Live on Stage: Stage version of Disney Animation's 1991 film Beauty and the Beast
- Plane Crazy: Original show featuring characters from The Disney Afternoon television shows
- The Spirit of Pocahontas: Based on Disney Animation's 1995 film Pocahontas
- Animazement—The Musical: Musical featuring characters from several Disney Animation films
- Snow White—An Enchanting Musical: Based on Disney Animation's 1937 film Snow White and the Seven Dwarfs

== Mickey's Toontown ==
- Jolly Trolley (1993–2003): The Jolly Trolley was a Trolley providing transportation from one end of Toontown to the other. Closed due to crowded walkways presenting safety hazards, meaning the trolleys could only operate on days with sparse crowds.
- Chip 'n Dale's Acorn Crawl (1993–1998)
- Goofy's Bounce House (1993–2008) (re-themed to Goofy's Playhouse)
- Goofy's Playhouse (2008–2022) (re-themed to Goofy's How-To-Play Yard)
- Donald's Boat (1993–2022) (re-themed to Donald's Duck Pond)
- Toon Park (1993–1998 or 1999) (re-themed to CenTOONial Park)
- Chip 'n Dale's Treehouse (1993–2020)

== Tomorrowland ==
- Circarama, U.S.A. (1955–1997), renamed Circle-Vision 360° in 1967: A film presentation showing scenes from around the United States and later China. Guests stood in a large circular room and watched a film projected on nine large, contiguous screens that surrounded them. During its run, the attraction was hosted by American Motors, Bell System, AT&T Corporation, Pacific Southwest Airlines, and Delta Air Lines. In 1998, the theater became the queue for the short-lived Rocket Rods attraction. The building now houses Buzz Lightyear Astro Blasters. Shows were:
  A Tour of the West (1955–1959)
  America the Beautiful (1960–1984)
  "All Because Man Wanted to Fly" (lobby pre-show) (1984–1989)
  American Journeys (1984–1996)
  Wonders of China (1984–1996)
  America the Beautiful (1996–1997)
- Clock of the World (1955–1966): A clock tower in the center of Tomorrowland
- Monsanto Hall of Chemistry (1955–1966): A hands-on museum-like attraction teaching guests about chemistry
- Monsanto's Fashions and Fabrics through the Ages (1965–1966): An exhibition on the evolution of women's attire from the Stone Age to the space age
- Space Station X-1 (1955–1960), renamed Satellite View of America in 1958: A circular screen showed America from space.
- Rocket to the Moon (1955–1966): Inside a building under a tall futuristic-looking rocket ship, the audience sat in seats around central viewing screens (top and bottom of the center of the room) so that they could see where they were going as they headed away from Earth and towards other worlds. As actual flight to the Moon became more likely, the ride was refurbished as:

- Flight to the Moon (1967–1975): A refurbished version of Rocket to the Moon with a mission control pre-show. The ride became obsolete as the United States sent actual crewed flights to the Moon between 1969 and 1972, and it was refurbished as:
- Mission to Mars (1975–1992): An updated version of Flight to the Moon, simulating spaceflight to Mars instead of the Moon.
The attraction building is now the site of Pizza Planet, a space-themed restaurant.

- Tomorrowland Boats (1955–1956), renamed Phantom Boats in 1956: The boat engines were unreliable, and this became the first permanent attraction to be removed from Disneyland. Later became the site of Submarine Voyage, now Finding Nemo Submarine Voyage.
- The World Beneath Us (1955–1960): A CinemaScope film about man's quest for energy, featuring an animated diorama of the Earth's crust.
- 20,000 Leagues Under the Sea Exhibit (1955–1966): A walk-through with sets from the 1954 film
- Flight Circle (1955–1966): A show about planes, cars and boats
- Hobbyland (1955–1966)
- Art Corner (1955–1966)
- Aluminum Hall of Fame (1955–1960)
- Dutch Boy Color Gallery (1955–1963)
- Starcade (1975–2015): A space themed arcade that was originally two stories but the second story closed in 1997.

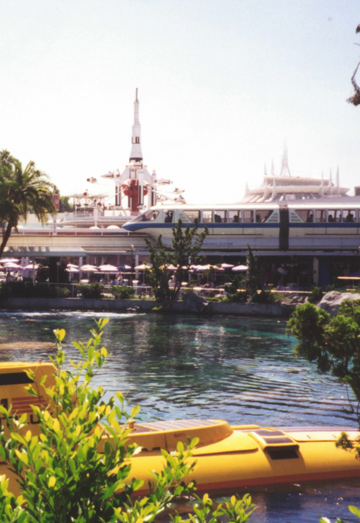
Rocket Jets in background, 1996, with Monorail and Submarines in foreground

- Astro Jets (1956–1964): A rocket-spinner ride originally located between Submarine Voyage and Flight to the Moon. Astro Jets has undergone the following name and location changes:

- Tomorrowland Jets (1964–1966): New name for the original attraction after corporate sponsor disagreements. After its closure the original attraction was dismantled and the Carousel of Progress theater was built on the site. The building now houses Star Wars Launch Bay and Super Hero HQ.
- Rocket Jets (1967–1997): A new version of the same ride, in a new location above the PeopleMover loading platform. The ride's mechanical components are now part of the Observatron, a sculpture on the same site that plays music and spins at regular intervals.
The ride's present incarnation is known as Astro Orbitor, located at the entrance to Tomorrowland from Main Street, and debuted in 1998.

- Crane Company Bathroom of Tomorrow (1956–1960)
- Skyway to Fantasyland (1956–1994): Aerial lift ride; see Skyway to Tomorrowland in Fantasyland, below. The Tomorrowland station was adjacent to the north side of the Carousel of Progress/America Sings (present-day Innoventions) building and has been demolished.
- Viewliner Train of Tomorrow (1957–1958): "The fastest miniature train in the world" ran alongside the Disneyland Railroad for just over a year, and therefore has the distinction of being the shortest-lived ride in the park's history.
- Monsanto House of the Future (1957–1967): A walk-through tour of a plastic house with plastic furnishings and interior and modern appliances such as dishwashers. The house was designed in roughly the shape of a plus sign with high-tech rounded exterior contours, all made from white plastic with large windows. It was anchored to a solid concrete foundation that proved to be so indestructible that, when it was dismantled, the work left some of the support pilings in place and are today hidden at the entrance to Pixie Hollow.

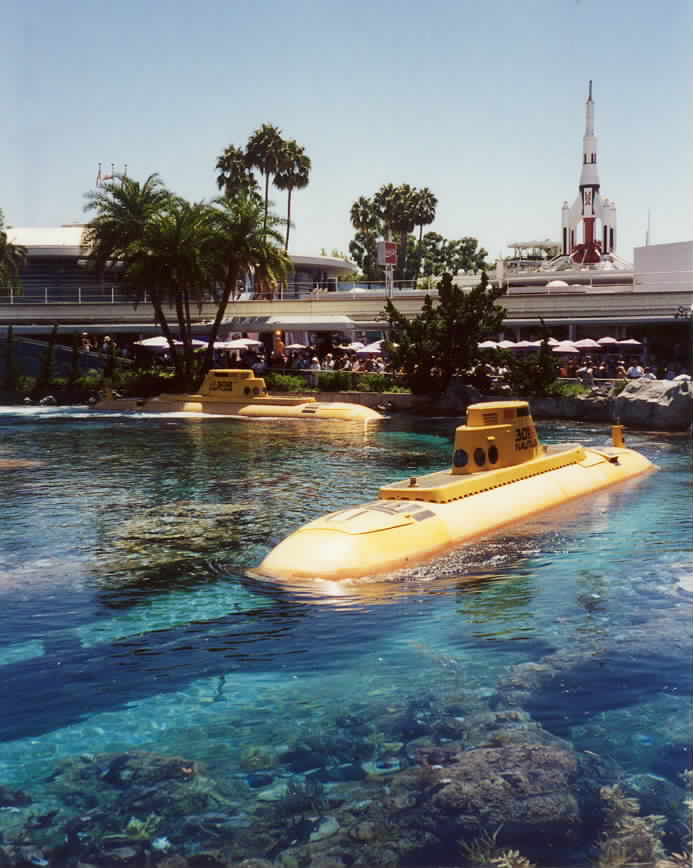
Submarine Voyage, 1995. Note Rocket Jets at background right and former Carousel of Progress/America Sings building behind palm trees at background left, abandoned at this time.

- Submarine Voyage (1959–1998): Riders entered the half-submerged miniature submarines by descending through access hatches at either end of the submarine, sat on tiny fold-down seats, and leaned forward to peer out through portholes on either side of the submarine. The submarines moved around a track in the mermaid lagoon and simulated diving by having bubbles rise around it with the purported captain intoning commands over the loudspeaker. On the trip, riders saw real-looking and imaginary sea life fastened to rocks or floating in the water, a treasure chest of gold, mermaids and a sea serpent, and passed under icebergs at the "North Pole". The submarines were originally military gray and named after US Navy nuclear-powered submarines but were repainted high-visibility yellow in the 1980s. The attraction returned as "Finding Nemo Submarine Voyage" in 2007.
- The Art of Animation (1960–1966)
- Flying Saucers (1961–1966): Guests rode in single-rider cars on a cushion of air that were steered by shifting body weight. The air cushion was supplied from below through holes in the floor that opened when the cars passed over. The ride's site later became the site of the Tomorrowland Stage, and is now the site of Magic Eye Theater.
- Fashion and Fabrics Through the Ages (1965–1966)
- Tomorrowland Stage (1967–1977): Performance venue for concerts and other stage shows, built on the site of the Flying Saucers. The stage was demolished due to the construction of Space Mountain, and was replaced by Space Stage (1977–1985), a performance venue that served a similar purpose to the Tomorrowland Stage. The stage's location is now the site of the Magic Eye Theater.
- General Electric Carousel of Progress (1967–1973): A sit-down show in which the building rotated the audience around a series of stages. The stages had audioanimatronic human figures and household appliances showing how appliances and electronics advanced about every 20 years from the turn of the century to the "modern" era of the early 1960s. The audience stopped in front of each stage while the characters joked with each other, described life at the time in history, and demonstrated their kitchen. This ride originated at the 1964 New York World's Fair and was installed at Disneyland after the fair closed. In 1974, Carousel of Progress was moved to Magic Kingdom at Walt Disney World, and the show building was used for America Sings and Innoventions.
- PeopleMover (1967–1995): A scenic, slow-moving ride high-above Tomorrowland that was intended to demonstrate how people could be shuttled around a central urban area without rushing to board individual trains or drive individual cars. It consisted of many dozens of small open-air cars seating up to eight riders, all running continuously on a track above and through the various attractions in Tomorrowland. After the ride was closed, the track sat vacant for two-and-a-half years until the opening of Rocket Rods.
- Adventure Thru Inner Space (1967–1985): A dark ride that pretended to shrink the rider gradually down to microscopic size within a snowflake, then further to view a water molecule in the flake, then finally to the point where one could see the throbbing nucleus of a single oxygen atom, with electrons zooming all around. The attraction was replaced by Star Tours in 1987 and is now the site of Star Tours: The Adventures Continue.
- America Sings (1974–1988): A sit-down show in the same building using the same stages as Carousel of Progress. Audio-Animatronics animal figures sang American songs from different eras. It was described as a "lighthearted journey to Musicland, U.S.A". After the attraction closed in spring of 1988, most of the Audio-Animatronics figures were recycled for Splash Mountain. Earlier in 1987, two Audio-Animatronic geese were removed from America Sings, their outer skins removed and used in the Star Tours queue as droids. The building sat empty from 1988 to 1998, except for seats, the old stages and some offices. Innoventions occupied the same building until its closure on March 31, 2015.* Tomorrowland Autopia (1955–1999): The original Autopia attraction. At least one other Autopia had existed in some form in Fantasyland since 1956. In 1999, the tracks of the Tomorrowland Autopia and the last version of the Fantasyland Autopia were combined to create the present-day Autopia, which opened in 2000.
- Toy Story Funhouse (1996–1997): A temporary stage show and exhibit themed to Pixar's first feature film, Toy Story (1995).

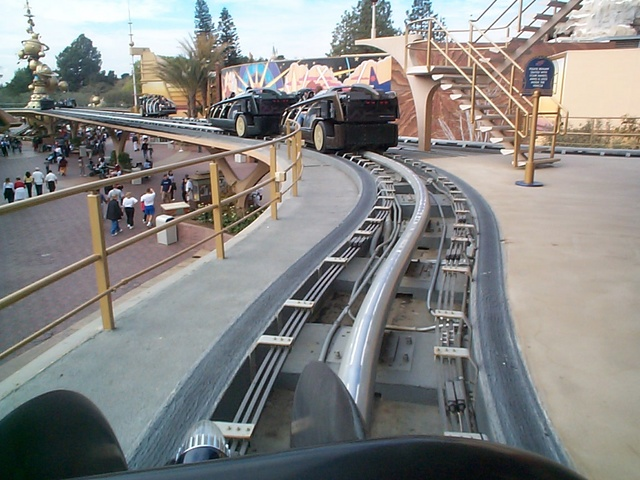
Rocket Rods leaving the launch platform. Cars paused before accelerating down the track, pictured in 2000

- Rocket Rods (1998–2000): A high-speed ride high above Tomorrowland along the former PeopleMover track. The ride's queue, which went through the old Circle-Vision theater, showed early Disney films about transportation combined with more recent footage. Rocket Rods experienced technical problems that frequently caused the ride to shut down. Its track and station remain standing and unused, and its queue area is now part of Buzz Lightyear Astro Blasters.
- The American Space Experience (1998–2003): An exhibit highlighting space exploration in conjunction with NASA's 40th anniversary. It occupied the former Premiere Shop location outside of the Circle-Vision 360 theater. Now the site of the Disney's Fastpass distribution center for Star Tours: The Adventures Continue and part of the Buzz Lightyear Astro Blasters ride.
- Star Tours (1987–2010): Built at the original site for Adventure Through Inner Space, this was Disney's first attempt at a motion simulator ride, based on the Star Wars film series. It was closed in late July 2010 to allow the area to be remodeled to a new attraction, Star Tours – The Adventures Continue which features all new simulators, along with a new story line and other changes, including the film being shown in high-definition 3-D film
- Innoventions (1998–2015): Built inside the Carousel Theater, its focus was to show near-futuristic technologies. The attraction closed on March 31, 2015.
- Jedi Training Academy (2015–2018)
- Star Wars Launch Bay (2015–2020)

== Holidayland ==
- Holidayland (1957–1961): Holidayland was a recreation area with a separate entrance before being replaced by New Orleans Square. Holidayland featured a baseball diamond, a circus and a picnic area and more resembled a park than a themed land.

== Parades ==
- Christmas in Many Lands (1957–1959?)
- Mickey at the Movies (1960–1964)
- Christmas Toy Parade (1960–1964?)
- Fantasy on Parade (1965–1976, 1980–1986)
- Mickey's Character Parade (Early 70's)
- America on Parade (1975–1976)
- Mickey's 50th Birthday Parade (1978)
- Dumbo's Circus Parade (1979)
- Disneyland's 25th Anniversary Family Reunion Parade (1980)
- It's a Small World Parade (1981)
- Flights of Fantasy (1983)
- American Gazette (1984–1985)
- Donald's 50th Birthday (1984)
- Mickey, Our Hero (1984)
- Disneyland's 30th Anniversary Parade (1985)
- Circus Fantasy Parade (1986–1988)
- Totally Minnie (1986–1987)
- Snow White's 50th Anniversary (1987)
- State Fair Parade (1987–1988)
- The Very Merry Christmas Parade (1987–1994)
- Blast To The Past (1988–1989)
- Mickey's 60th Birthday (1988–1989)
- Hooray For Disney Stars Parade (1989–1990)
- Party Gras Parade (1990)
- Celebration, U.S.A. (1991)
- Livin' in the USA (1992)
- The World According to Goofy (1992)
- Aladdin's Royal Caravan (1993–1994)
- The Lion King Celebration (1994–1997)
- Crusin' The Kingdom (1995–1997)
- Light Magic (1997)
- Hercules' Victory Parade (1997–1998)
- Mulan Parade (1998–1999)
- 45 Years of Magic Parade/Parade of the Stars (2000–2005)
- Walt Disney's Parade of Dreams (2005–2008)
- Celebrate! A Street Party (2009–2010)
- Paint the Night Parade (May 22, 2015 – January 8, 2017), (May 16, 2025 – August 20, 2026)
- Pixar Play Parade (April – November 2018)
- Mickey's Soundsational Parade (2011–2019)
- Main Street Electrical Parade (June 1972 – 1996), (January 19 – August 20, 2017), (August 2 – September 30, 2019), (April 22 - September 1, 2022)
- Magic Happens (February 27 – March 11, 2020; 2023 - 2024) (Reopening in February 2027)

== Fireworks ==
- Fantasy in the Sky (1958—1996, January — May 2015, September 2016 — January 2017)
- Believe... There's Magic in the Stars (February 2000 — May 2004)
- Imagine... A Fantasy in the Sky (June 2004 — April 2005)
- Remember... Dreams Come True (May 2005 – June 2009, January 2010 — November 2014, February 2017 — April 2018, September 2018 — January 2019) (Returning in February 2027)
- Magical: Disney's New Nighttime Spectacular of Magical Celebrations (2009—2014)
- Disneyland Forever (May 2015 — September 2016, June — September 2019, April — September 2022)
- Together Forever: A Pixar Nighttime Spectacular (April — September 2018, April — August 2024)
- Mickey's Mix Magic (January — June 2019, October 2019 — March 2020, September 2022 — January 2023, 2024, November 2026)
- Wondrous Journeys (January — August 2023, March — April 2024, May 2025 — August 2026)

== Projections ==
- Tapestry of Happiness (May 2025 — November 2026)

== See also ==
- List of Disneyland attractions
- List of former Disney California Adventure attractions
- List of Disney California Adventure attractions
