= Walt Disney's Parade of Dreams =

Former parade at Disneyland

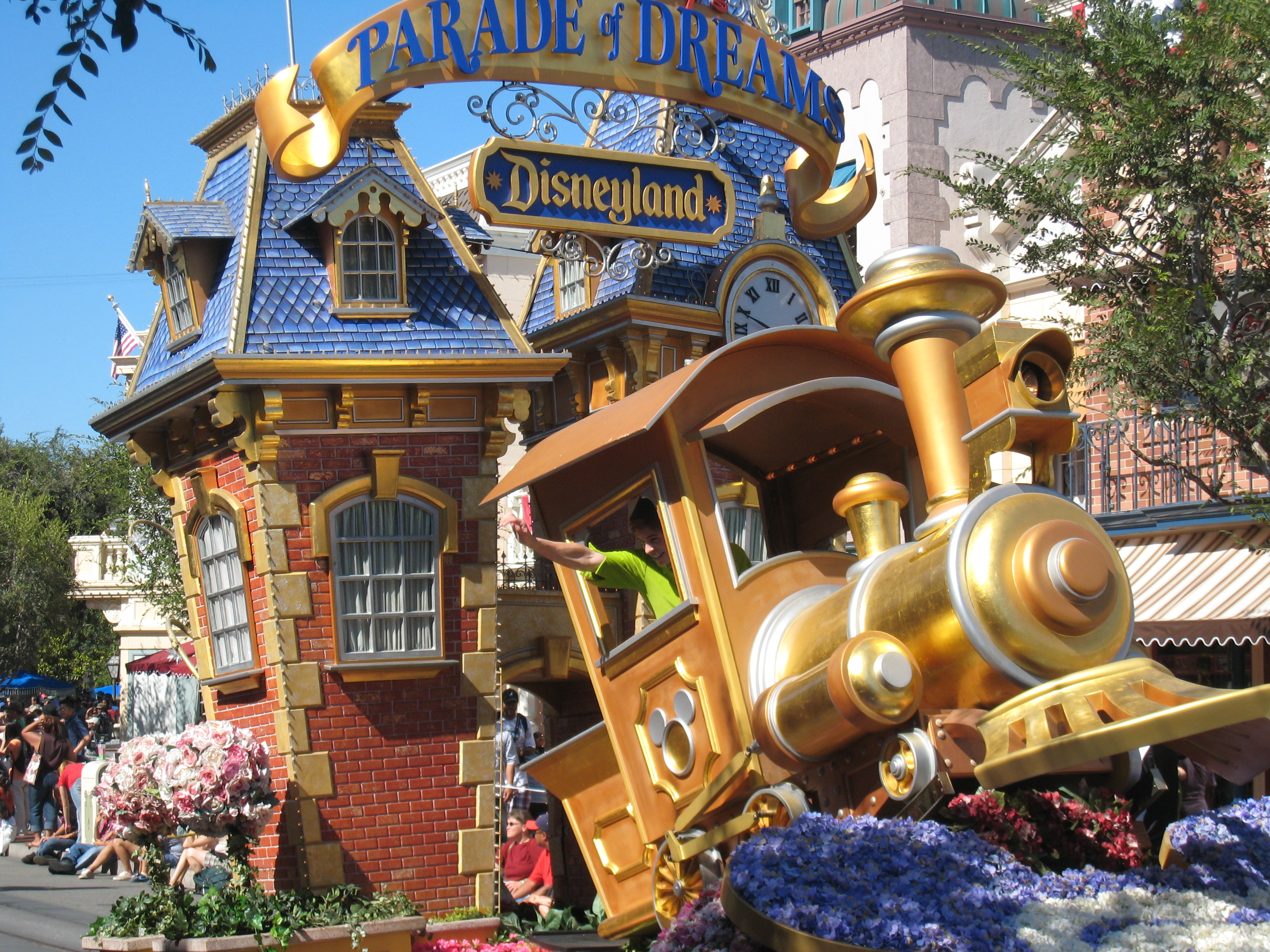
- Parade of Dreams' lead float

Disneyland
- Status: Removed
- Opening date: May 5, 2005
- Closing date: November 11, 2008
- Replaced: Parade of the Stars
- Replaced by: Celebrate! A Street Party

Ride statistics
- Attraction type: Parade

Walt Disney's Parade of Dreams premiered on May 5, 2005 as part of the Happiest Homecoming on Earth, celebrating the 50th anniversary of Disneyland in California. Conceived by VP Parades and Spectaculars, Steve Davison, the parade celebrates the dreams of Disney characters and includes Disney characters such as Mickey, Minnie, Tinker Bell, Cinderella, Snow White, Simba, Alice and Mad Hatter, Pinocchio, Belle and Beast, Ariel, Donald, Goofy and Pluto. The parade includes eight floats which include Getaway to Dreams, Dream of Enchantment, Dream of Laughter, Dream of Another World, Dream of Imagination, Dream of Adventure, and Dreams Come True. It closed in November 2008 before the Holidays at Disneyland without notice to the public.

== Pre-parade/grand marshal ==
As part of "Year of a Million Dreams", one lucky family was chosen to be part of the "Grand Marshal Pre-Parade Cavalcade" and to stay one night in the Mickey Mouse Penthouse located in the Disneyland Hotel or the Disneyland Dream Suite in New Orleans Square. The family journeyed along the parade route with the Mayor of Main Street and other Disney characters such as Winnie the Pooh, Tigger, Eeyore, Mary Poppins, Bert, Woody, Jessie, Aladdin and Jasmine. The "Grand Marshal Pre-Parade Cavalcade" featured two banner holders, six dancers, and two rope carriers as well. The song played was "The Happiest Place on Earth". On August 17, 2008, this pre-parade was cut back to only include the Mayor and the lucky family.

A pre-parade is a mini-parade with usually one float with the main character(s) that promote an upcoming Disney movie. There were four Pre-Parades for Walt Disney's Parade of Dreams, Ratatouille, Enchanted, Prince Caspian and Bolt.

For the Resort's 2009 "Celebrate Today" campaign it was initially planned for Walt Disney's Parade of Dreams to continue operation with an updated show stop sequence re-scoree to feature the campaign's signature song "Celebrate You". This was so set in stone that the new song's recording was timecoded precisely to match the current parade's show stop choreography. The full "Celebrate...A Street Party" would designed to be a pre-show to the actual parade with sets that were far simpler. However, due to budget cuts at Disneyland, Management decided to cut "Walt Disney's Parade of Dreams" without notice and simply offer the alternative "Celebrate...A Street Party" as the only street entertainment in Disneyland until the winter return of 'A Christmas Fanstasy' and the debut of "Mickey's Soundsational Parade". The floats for 'Walt Disney's Parade of Dreams" were quietly dismantled with no formal public announcement. The recording of the intended show stop was ultimately utilized for Magic Kingdom's "Celebrate a Dream Come True Parade" following the decision.

== Parade units and characters ==
- Happiest Homecoming on Earth Introduction: "Fifty years ago a magical place was born; a place of Enchantment and Adventure, Laughter and Imagination, where new worlds of joy and wonder just waited to be discovered and in this marvelous kingdom there lived many delightful friends who made our dreams come true. Today we invite you to celebrate fifty years of magical memories with your Disney family as we proudly present Walt Disney's Parade of Dreams, we dedicate it to dreamers around the world and to that special dream that first began when Walt Disney proclaimed To All Who Come to This Happy Place, Welcome."-Voice Over by Julie Andrews
- Year of a Million Dreams introduction: "Once upon a time, a marvelous dreamer found the power to transform wishes into reality, and with just a sprinkle of pixie dust, a magical kingdom came alive for dreamers of all ages to enjoy. Soon the young at heart gathered from around the world, following their dreams to the place where anything is possible. The magic place where dreams come true. Walt Disney's Parade of Dreams is dedicated to children of all ages, and to that special dream that first began when Walt Disney proclaimed 'To All Who Come to This Happy Place, Welcome.'"
- Gateway to Dreams: Peter Pan is inside a golden train with Tinker Bell sitting on top of it with the Main Street train station as the backdrop of the unit. The Fairy Godmother of Cinderella, the Blue Fairy from Pinocchio and Flora, Fauna, & Merryweather from Sleeping Beauty dance around this unit. (Occasionally Merlin from The Sword in the Stone may fill in for any Opening Unit characters which may have been cut from the performance, except Tinkerbell, and the 3 fairies).
- Dream of Enchantment (Beauty and the Beast Unit): Belle and Beast dance and an Audio-Animatronic Lumiere sings. Cogsworth, Mrs. Potts, and Chip entertain the crowd as well while spoons, forks, knives, salt & pepper shakers, a feather duster, and plate dancers perform around the unit. This was Jerry Orbach's last time supplying the voice of Lumiere. Orbach died in December 2004 after he recorded the dialogue for the parade.

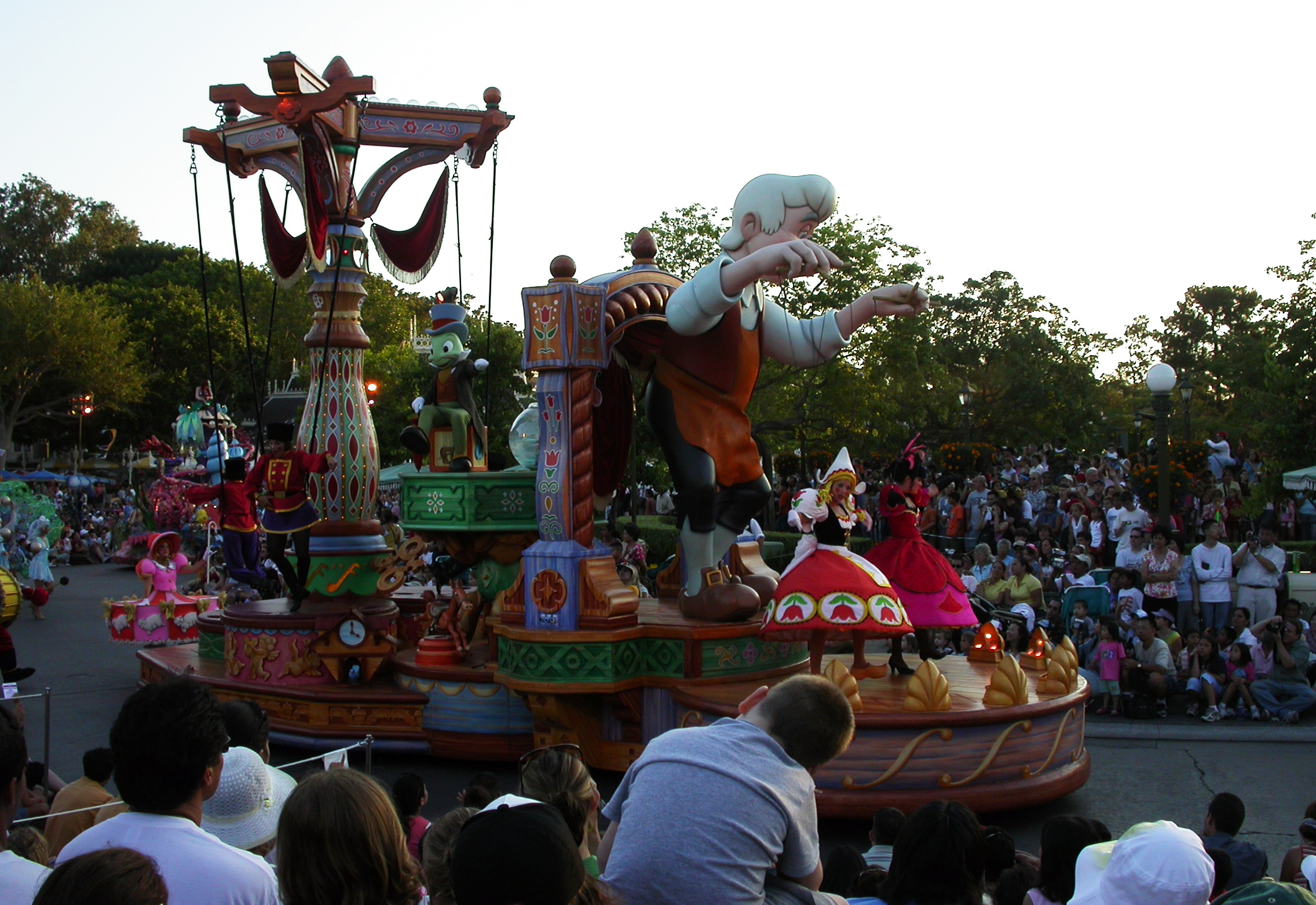
Pinocchio float

- Dream of Laughter (Pinocchio Unit): Pinocchio and toys from Geppetto's workshop dance around a giant Geppetto who is controlling the Can-Can and in the background music playing "An actors life for me" and Dutch dancing puppets from the movie. Hanging behind the unit are Russian puppets on bungee cords. The part of the unit that they hang on rises up during the show stop to allow the Russian puppets to perform bungee tricks. Other toys include two bell ringers, two ballroom dancers attached to female doll counterparts, a toy drummer, and Bo Peep. Other characters include Foulfellow, Gideon, Jiminy Cricket sitting atop a toy block and Cleo swimming around in her fish bowl (as of September 28, 2008, Jiminy Cricket will no longer be part of the Parade).
- Dream of Another World (The Little Mermaid Unit): Ariel sits on top of a giant fountain made of clam shells, with Part of Your World and Under the Sea playing in the background. Bubbles float around Ariel. This unit also features Audio-Animatronics Sebastian and Flounder. Before the unit are dancers decorated like stylized waves, blue and white pearl dancers, and light-colored 'fish kites' (No Longer a part of the Parade). When the Parade returned in 2007 the water fountains on Ariel's shell was replaced by clear plastic tubing. For the parade's 2008 run, the fountains returned. A giant Ursula puppet makes potions and cackles to "Poor Unfortunate Souls" while Flotsam and Jetsam lurk around. Black Pearl dancers perform for the audience as well. A soft, dark instrumental version of "Under the Sea" can also be heard during this sequence.
- Dream of Imagination (Alice in Wonderland Unit): It carries a live-action Mad Hatter and Alice. A giant animatronic Caterpillar sits on the back of the unit atop a mushroom, and music from the masterpiece itself: "Unbirthday song and joyful Mad tea Party music too!" The Queen of Hearts and White Rabbit entertain the crowd, while Tweedle Dee and Dum are pushing stylized tea cups, a pair of Royal Marching Cards, and four 'jumping' flowers entertain the crowd. The Cards climb atop the trampoline during the show stop to perform incredible acrobatics.
- Dream of Adventure (The Lion King Unit): Simba atop Pride Rock with Zazu, Pumbaa sleeping in a hammock, a live-action Timon, Rafiki and Nala. Various costumed animal dancers surround the unit, such as a tiger, panther, antelope, chimpanzee, cheetah, leopard, and a life-sized rhinoceros along with walking stilt performers dressed as a stylized zebra and giraffe. On the back of the unit are two Bird performers. During the show stop, the "tree" part of the unit raises up and the Birds perform an amazing Spanish Web routine.
- Dreams Come True (Finale Unit): Lastly, Mickey and Minnie as King and Queen on Sleeping Beauty Castle with other Disney royalty, including Princess Aurora (Sleeping Beauty), Snow White, and Cinderella and their Princes. Attendants Chip 'n' Dale, Goofy, Pluto, and Donald also perform on and around this unit along with the Seven Dwarfs entertaining guests. With the "Welcome" song in the background and have a dance to end the parade. (Occasionally all of the dwarfs except Dopey will be absent, but this is rare.)

== Show facts ==
- Show length: Approximately 35 minutes with three show stops
- Show Stop Song: An upbeat version of "Welcome" from Disney's Brother Bear, composed by Phil Collins and performed by Jump5
- Other Songs Featured:
  - OPENING UNIT:
    - "Welcome" / "Magical House Cleaning" / "You Can Fly" / "When You Wish Upon A Star" / "Bibbidi-Bobbidi-Boo"
  - BEAUTY & THE BEAST UNIT:
    - "Belle" / "Beauty and the Beast"/ "Be Our Guest"
  - PINOCCHIO UNIT:
    - "I've Got No Strings" / "Hi-Diddle-Dee-Dee (An Actor's Life for Me)"
  - THE LITTLE MERMAID UNIT:
    - "Part of that World" / "Under the Sea"/ "Poor Unfortunate Souls"
  - ALICE IN WONDERLAND UNIT:
    - "I'm Late" / "The Unbirthday Song" / "Alice in Wonderland" / "March of the Cards" / "How Do You Do and Shake Hands" / "March of the Cards" (reprise)
  - LION KING UNIT:
    - "Circle of Life" / "I Just Can't Wait To Be King" / "Hakuna-Matata"
  - FINALE UNIT:
    - "Welcome" / "Hail to the Princess Aurora" / "A Dream is a Wish Your Heart Makes" / "Someday My Prince Will Come" / "When You Wish Upon A Star" / "Mickey Mouse Club March"
- Pre-Parade/Grand Marshal Song: "The Happiest Place on Earth"
- Show Times and Information: Generally 3:30pm (Small World to Main Street) and 6:30pm (Main Street to Small World). During off seasons, there is generally only one parade at 7:00pm that will go from Small World to Main Street. On hotter days, there are times where there will be only two show stops and reduced choreography.
- Previous Parades:
  - Parades before Hercules Victory Parade were all presented back-to-back with the Electrical Parade
    - Parade of the Stars (45th Anniversary Parade)
    - Mulan Parade
      - This parade was presented back-to-back with the Christmas Fantasy Parade for the 1998 holiday season.
    - Hercules Victory Parade
    - The Lion King Celebration Parade
    - Aladdin's Royal Caravan Parade
    - The World According to Goofy Parade
      - A parade similar to this exists at Tokyo Disneyland and The Magic Kingdom called Mickey Mania
      - When this parade ended, all performances of the parade that was running back-to-back with was temporary suspended due to portions of the parade route closing in order for the outside of It's a Small World to be refurbished.
    - Celebration U.S.A. Parade
    - Party Gras Parade

== See also ==
- List of former Disneyland attractions
