= Front Lot =

Former area in Walt Disney Studios Park

Walt Disney Studios Park
- Status: Defunct
- Opened: March 16, 2002
- Closed: April 24, 2024
- Replaced by: World Premiere Plaza

Front Lot is a formerly themed land or studio lot at Walt Disney Studios Park in Disneyland Paris, based on the glamorous administration areas of Hollywood movie studios from the "golden age" of movies in the 1930s. It serves as the main entrance area of the park, similar to Main Street USA, with park services and several boutiques. Earffel Tower, the park's icon, is located in this area.

Its focal point, Disney Studio 1, is based on the first soundstage ever owned by Walt Disney himself, at the original Disney Bros. Studios on Hyperion Avenue, Burbank, California. The central square is named Place des Frères Lumière, featuring a bronze-effect fountain - the Fantasia Fountain - at its heart.

On April 12, 2025, following the announcement, it was reported that World Premiere and World Premiere Plaza will open on May 15, 2025, since Front Lot area was permanently closed on April 24, 2024, to make way for a new land, World Premiere as a new entrance area.

== Attractions ==
- Disney Theater (Redesignation on World Premiere Plaza)
  - World Premiere (Redesignation on World Premiere Plaza)

=== Former attractions ===
- Disney Studio 1 (2002–2024)

== Entertainment ==
- 20th Century Orchestra (Redesignation on World Premiere Plaza)

=== Former Entertainment ===
- Studio One Orchestra

== Restaurants ==
- Club Swankadero Coffee (Redesignation on World Premiere Plaza)
- Hollywood Gardens Restaurant (Redesignation on World Premiere Plaza)
- Hollywood & Vine: Five and Dime (Redesignation on World Premiere Plaza)
- Searchlight (Redesignation on World Premiere Plaza)

=== Former restaurants ===
- Restaurant en Coulisse

== Shops ==
- Walt Disney Studios Store (Redesignation on World Premiere Plaza)
- Studio Photo (Redesignation on World Premiere Plaza)
- Hollywood Pictures Museum (Redesignation on World Premiere Plaza)
- Mickey's of Hollywood Boutique (Redesignation on World Premiere Plaza)

=== Former Shops ===
- Hollywood Jewel Box
- Les Légends d'Hollywood
