= Monsanto House of the Future =

Former structure at Disneyland

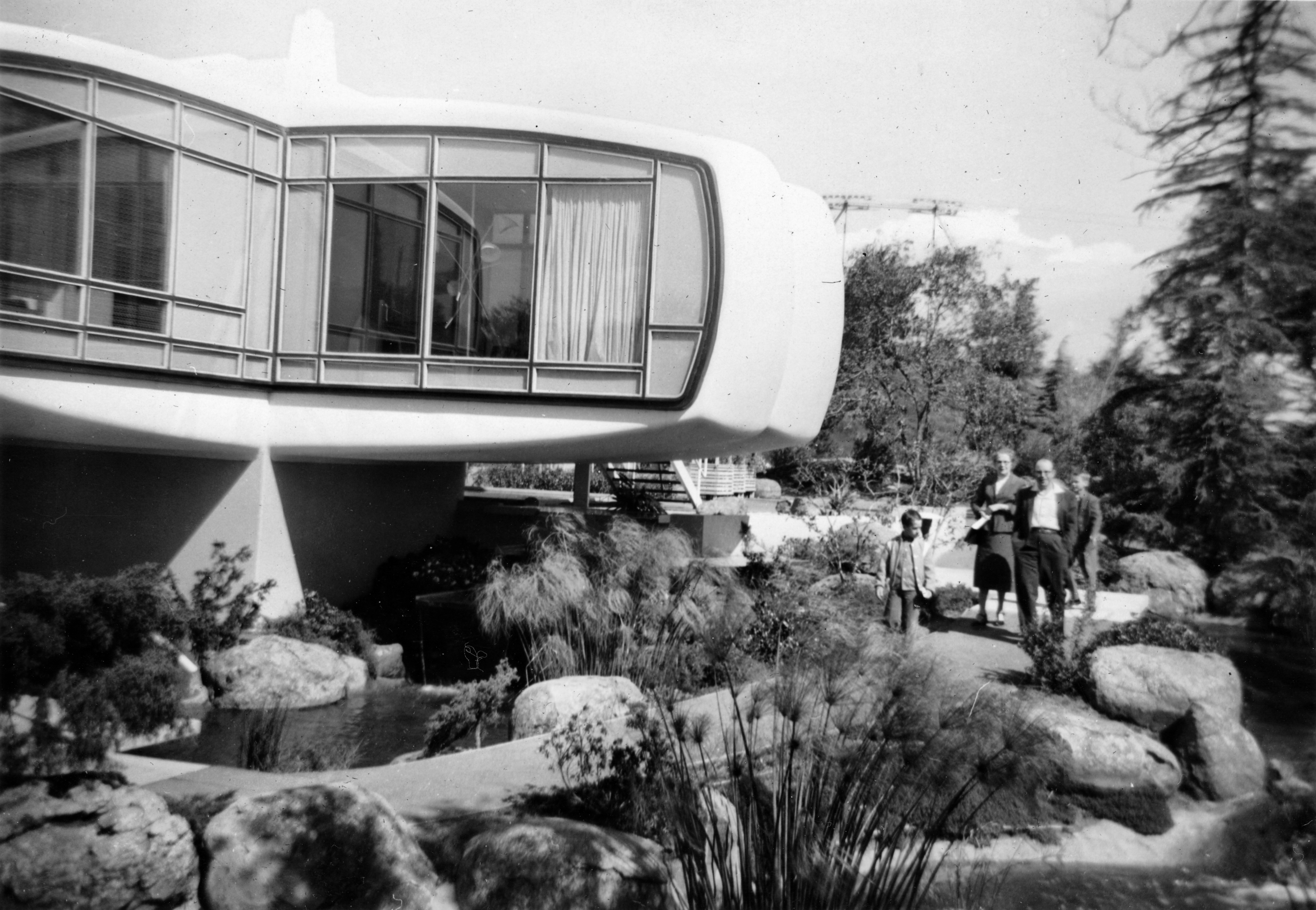

Disneyland
- Area: Tomorrowland
- Coordinates: 33°48′45″N 117°55′06″W
- Status: Closed
- Soft opening date: June 11, 1957
- Opening date: June 12, 1957
- Closing date: December 1967
- Replaced by: Alpine Gardens

Ride statistics
- Attraction type: Walkthrough attraction
- Designer: Marvin Goody & Richard Hamilton
- Theme: Futuristic House set in 1986
- Site area: 1,280 sq ft (119 m^{2})
- Participants per group: 60,000 per week
- Sponsor: Monsanto Company

The Monsanto House of the Future was an attraction at Disneyland's Tomorrowland in Anaheim, California, United States, from 1957 to 1967. It offered a tour of a futuristic home, and was intended to demonstrate the versatility of modern plastics.

== History ==
Sponsored by Monsanto Company, the House of the Future was made possible by Monsanto, the Massachusetts Institute of Technology (MIT), and WED Enterprises. With this project, Monsanto wanted to demonstrate plastic's versatility as a high-quality, engineered material. The design team for this innovative structure included MIT architecture faculty Richard Hamilton and Marvin Goody (founders of Goody Clancy) and MIT civil engineering faculty Albert G. H. Dietz, Frank J. Heger, Jr. (a founder of Simpson Gumpertz & Heger) and Frederick J. McGarry. The MIT faculty worked with the Engineering Department of Monsanto's Plastics Division, including R. P. Whittier and M. F. Gigliotti. The house, featuring four symmetric wings cantilevered off a central core, was fabricated with glass-reinforced plastics.

The attraction offered a tour of a home of the future, featuring household appliances such as microwave ovens, which eventually became commonplace. The house saw over 435,000 visitors within the first six weeks of opening, and ultimately saw over 20 million visitors before being closed.

The house closed in 1967. The building was so sturdy that when demolition crews failed to demolish the house using wrecking balls, torches, chainsaws, and jackhammers, it was ultimately demolished using choker chains to crush it into smaller parts. The plastic structure was so strong that the half-inch steel bolts used to mount it to its foundation broke before the structure itself did.

The reinforced concrete foundation was never removed and remains in its original location, now at Pixie Hollow, where it has been painted green and is used as a planter. The concrete base can be seen covered in camouflage and netting over the top of Disneyland's signature "Go Away Green" paint behind the Pixie Hollow sign.

== Legacy ==
The House of the Future has had a significant impact on later design at Disney and Epcot. In February 2008, Disney announced it would conceptually bring back the attraction with a more modern and accessible interior. The $15 million Innoventions Dream Home was a collaboration of the Walt Disney Company, Microsoft, Hewlett-Packard, software maker LifeWare, and homebuilder Taylor Morrison.

In 2010, MIT Museum Architecture Curator Gary Van Zante gave a presentation on campus where he showed archived drawings and photographs of the plastic house. The talk, titled Back to the Future: A 1950s House of the Future, was part of the Cambridge Science Festival.

The attraction served as the basis for The Wonderful World of Mickey Mouse episode "House of Tomorrow".

== See also ==
- List of former Disneyland attractions
