= Tahitian Terrace =

Restaurant at Disneyland (1962–92)

Restaurant information
- Established: June 1962
- Closed: April 17, 1993
- Location: Adventureland, Disneyland Park, Disneyland Resort (1313 South Harbor Boulevard), Anaheim, California, U.S.

The Tahitian Terrace was a Polynesian-themed restaurant located in the Adventureland section of Disneyland in Anaheim, California, from 1962 to 1993. It was the park's first dinner theater experience, with entertainment provided by a troupe of Polynesian dancers and musicians. The restaurant was originally sponsored by Stouffer's, then Kikkoman took over in the 1980s. The Tahitian Terrace was replaced by Aladdin's Oasis in 1993, and the area has been the Tropical Hideaway since 2018.

Another Tahitian Terrace restaurant opened at Hong Kong Disneyland in 2005 and is still operating.

== History ==
=== Before the Tahitian Terrace ===
The area that would become the Tahitian Terrace was originally occupied by the Pavilion Restaurant—a facility straddling Main Street, U.S.A. and Adventureland with a bifurcated theme (Victorian architecture on one side, thatched roof on the other). Guests would buy their food from a counter on the Main Street side and then be served on a Hawaiian themed counter on the Main Street side. Guests would then dine on the large patio overlooking the Jungle Cruise.

Not long after Disneyland opened, a live tropical-themed musical quartet was placed on the Pavilion's dining patio to entertain guests. In 1957, Disneyland expanded its live entertainment offerings and hired an authentic Hawaiian trio with a hula dancer for the patio and also constructed a semi-permanent stage. Over the next four years, the entertainment expanded to a quartet and quintet and the stage was redesigned several times.

In 1961, Walt Disney and Disney entertainment director Tommy Walker hired Polynesian dancer Pete Seanoa to form a performance troupe for the Pavilion patio. Seanoa found dancers in the tight-knit Polynesian community of Southern California and by late summer, the Pavilion patio had hula dancers, fire knife dancers, and firewalking. With this new troupe, dubbed the Royal Tahitians, came a new and more elaborate stage.

In April 1962, the Royal Tahitians were featured in an episode of Walt Disney's Wonderful World of Color called "Disneyland After Dark" (the show was filmed the previous September). The troupe went through a demonstration of hula, firewalking, and fire-knife dancing. The episode was eventually released theatrically both in the U.S. and abroad.

=== Tahitian Terrace opens ===
The same year, Disneyland began a $7 million expansion of Adventureland, which started with the opening of the Tahitian Terrace in the former location of the Pavilion Restaurant in June. The new restaurant was a dinner show experience—the first in a Disney Park. Served at outdoor tables, guests could sample exotic South Seas foods, including "sizzling teriyaki steak, savory shrimp tempura, fried almonds in rich egg batter, and raisin ice cream topped with flaming caramel sauce." The signature drink was the non-alcoholic Planter's Punch, served in a tall frosted glass with faux flower garnish. In 1962, a full dinner, including drink and dessert, cost under $4 ($43 in 2025 dollars). Guests at the restaurant were given free leis. Lunchtime service had no entertainment, but the dinner hours offered the full dinner show experience.

The back of the menu described the show, the Tahitian Terrace Polynesian Revue, a "travelogue journey" through the traditions of the featured Pacific island cultures.:

"Nestled beneath the tumbling waterfall is a matchless stage setting... a stage whose 'curtain' is a cascade of water, and whose 'footlights' are a leaping flame of fire burning on the water itself! For your summer evening entertainment, the falls magically draw aside...and out from behind the waters, sarong-clad natives appear to perform the swaying rhythms and amazing rituals of the islands...the hypnotic bare-foot fire walk and thrilling fire-knife dance, and the traditional grass-skirted hula of Samoa, Tahiti and Hawaii.

The stage was the center of the restaurant's outdoor dining area, with guest tables placed on tiered levels for viewing. Covering the stage was the canopy of 35-foot-tall artificial coral tree. Disneyland horticulturalist Morgan "Bill" Evans originally intended to use a real coral tree as the central feature in the dining patio, but Walt Disney said it wasn't big enough. When the artificial tree was initially installed, it too was not tall enough—with Walt noting that the tree's canopy was too low for guests seated on the restaurant's upper tiers to see the show. Walt proposed that the tree be cut in half, the top half hoisted up six feet by crane, and the gap filled in with more concrete.

In the summer of 1962, Disneyland produced a weekly live television show for Los Angeles station KTTV called Meet Me at Disneyland, to entice local residents to visit the theme park on weekdays. The new Tahitian Terrace was featured in the sixth episode, "Tahitian Terrace Show", which aired on July 14, 1962. The episode included a demonstration of Polynesian dances by the Royal Tahitians, and an appearance by Mouseketeer Annette Funicello.

The Tahitian Terrace operated seasonally. Summer was the longest season, with dining and performances going seven days a week. The same went for the two-week Christmas holiday season and the spring break weeks. But between New Year's and the spring break weeks as well as from the end of summer to Thanksgiving, the restaurant was either completely closed for refurbishment or on a weekend-only schedule. Through its kitchen facilities, the Tahitian Terrace was connected to the Plaza Pavilion restaurant (which also opened in 1962) and Walt Disney's Enchanted Tiki Room (which was originally intended to be a restaurant).

In 1972, a new Polynesian Revue show debuted at the Tahitian Terrace—produced by the Kau'i-Pono dance company, who also provided performers for the Polynesian Luau at Disney's Polynesian Village Resort at the Walt Disney World Resort. Other shows were performed in tandem with the Polynesian Revue beginning in 1986 with the South Seas Paradise Revue. Mickey's South Seas Celebration opened in 1988 and was the restaurant's first character-based show. Another character show, Jewel of the Island (or Legend of the Island Jewel) debuted in 1989 as a lunchtime offering. Drums of the Islands opened in 1991 and was short-lived. The same year, the restaurant reverted to only performing the Polynesian Revue.

=== Aladdin's Oasis ===
The Tahitian Terrace closed on April 17, 1993. But the closure wasn't because of a lack of attendance; in fact, the restaurant was consistently busy right up until it closed. Disneyland Operations saw the facility as underutilized, so they wanted to get rid of the dinner show concept. Walt Disney Imagineering executive show producer Eddie Sotto suggested that the restaurant instead be converted into a dinner show based on Disney's animated feature, Aladdin, which had opened the previous November.

After a fast-paced three-month refurbishment, the restaurant reopened as Aladdin's Oasis. Instead of Polynesian-inspired food, the restaurant now served Middle Eastern cuisine. The waterfalls and rockwork of the performing area were replaced with a replica of the huge tiger head that formed the entrance of the Cave of Wonders from the film, but the coral tree remained—though the stage was now almost completely separated from the Jungle Cruise. The new dinner show, which starred the Aladdin characters as well as several characters created just for the show, could accommodate up to eight shows a day.

In August 1994, the dinner show was discontinued, but the restaurant continued to have table-service dining on busier days through 1995. In 1996, the entire restaurant facility was closed and used only for private events.

=== After Aladdin's Oasis ===
In 1997, the dinner show was replaced by Aladdin & Jasmine's Story-Tale Adventures—a live storytelling character show with no food component. That show closed in April 2008 and was replaced by Indiana Jones and the Secrets of the Stone Tiger, a stunt show which opened in time to promote the fourth Indian Jones film, Indiana Jones and the Kingdom of the Crystal Skull. After that promotion ended in late 2008, the stage and dining area were closed off and used for character meet-and-greets and private events.

In 2014, the restaurant and seating portion of Aladdin's Oasis re-opened for "On the Go" dining packages for Fantasmic!,Paint the Night in 2015, and the Main Street Electrical Parade in 2016. The Aladdin characters stopped meeting guests in 2016, when Moana began meeting guests until Aladdin's Oasis closed on May 16, 2018.

On December 21, 2018, Aladdin's Oasis was completely replaced by a new Polynesian-themed food service area called the Tropical Hideaway. Inspired by the stories and lore of Adventureland, the counter-service facility became a new home for the Dole Whip. The view of the Jungle Cruise was also restored. However, there is no live entertainment.

== Similar restaurants ==
When the Walt Disney World Resort opened in October 1971, Disney's Polynesian Village Resort offered a Polynesian revue dinner show very similar to the Tahitian Terrace. The Kau'i-Pono dance company provided all the performers and Pete Seanoa was consulted on the show as well. It became The Spirit of Aloha dinner show in 2003 and closed in March 2020. The Luau Cover performance space was razed to make way for the Island Tower at Disney's Polynesian Village Resort, a new Disney Vacation Club development, which will open in December 2024.

Tokyo Disneyland opened with the Polynesian Terrace restaurant in 1983. Like the Tahitian Terrace, this venue is a dinner show and is currently presenting Mickey's Rainbow Luau.

A Tahitian Terrace restaurant opened with Hong Kong Disneyland on September 12, 2005. The location is a quick-service restaurant and has no live entertainment.
