= Art Corner =

Art Corner was a retail store that operated at Disneyland amusement park in Anaheim, California, from 1955 until 1966. The store was located in the Tomorrowland area of the park.

== History ==
When Disneyland opened in Anaheim, California, on July 17, 1955, a temporary location for the store was set up at the end of Main Street, U.S.A., in a striped tent adjacent to the Red Wagon Inn. It offered souvenirs and Disneyana. The permanent location opened on September 15, 1955.

== Store offerings ==
One of The Art Corner's main claims to fame is as an outlet for Disney animation cels. These collector-prized items had once been available through the Courvoisier Gallery (from 1938 until 1946), but had been off the market until Disneyland opened in 1955. Disney collector Rob Richards notes "The Art Corner rescued thousands of cels from being destroyed and saved them for posterity." Other offerings that had an immense impact on future artists were a series of Cartoon Character Guides on drawing Mickey Mouse, Goofy, Pluto, Jiminy Cricket, Chip 'n' Dale, Donald Duck, flip books, and animation kits.

== Art of Animation exhibit ==
On May 28, 1960, an exhibit, The Art of Animation, opened adjacent to the store. It contained artwork and other items, including a thaumatrope, drawn from an international traveling display that had promoted the release of Sleeping Beauty. It closed on September 5, 1966, to make way for the renovation of Tomorrowland. The Art Corner permanently closed on September 6, 1966, also to make way for the renovation.

== Legacy ==
The Art Corner was a precursor of the Disneyana shop that sold vintage Disneyana which operated on Main Street U.S.A. from 1976 to 1986. The current Main Street Disneyana shop (opened in May 1998) solely sells books and limited edition merchandise/art prints. Unlike its predecessors, this shop does not offer vintage Disneyana products.

== See also ==
- List of former Disneyland attractions
