= Innoventions =

Innoventions may refer to:

- Innoventions (Epcot), at Walt Disney World in Florida
- Innoventions (Disneyland), in California
