= Disney Studio 1 =

Building at Disneyland Paris

- Studio 1, as seen from the Front Lot.

Disney Adventure World
- Area: Front Lot
- Status: Closed
- Opening date: March 16, 2002
- Closing date: April 24, 2024
- Replaced by: World Premiere

Ride statistics
- Designer: Walt Disney Imagineering
- Theme: Hollywood
- Wheelchair accessible

Disney Studio 1 is the largest building and attraction located in the Disney Adventure World in Disneyland Paris. Until the building's temporary closure, guests entering the park walked through the building to have access to the remainder of the park. The interior is a reconstruction of a street in Hollywood.

The right side of the building featured eight facades based on various Hollywood buildings, both real and fictional, from the 1920s to 1940s: Schwab's Pharmacy, Celebrity Five and Dime, The Darkroom/Cover Story, The Brown Derby, Club Swankedero, The Gunga Den, The Hep Cat Club, and The Liki Tiki. Behind these facades was the Restaurant en Coulisse, a fast-food restaurant.

The left side featured six facades of fictional retail buildings, including: The Darkroom/Shutterbugs, Glamour Girl Cosmetics, The Alexandria Theater, Hollywood and Vine Five & Dime, The Gossip Column, and Last Chance Gas. The Legends of Hollywood boutique-store could be found behind them.

On July 5, 2003, the Shutterbugs building facade was turned into an actual working photo studio.

On April 12, 2024, Disneyland Paris announced that Disney Studio 1 would be renamed to World Premiere, once reopened after an extensive refurbishment in originally set to open in April 2025. However, on April 12, 2025, it was announced that World Premiere and World Premiere Plaza would open on May 15, 2025, since Front Lot area was permanently closed to make way for a new land, World Premiere as became a new entrance area.

== See also ==
Photograph of the "Last Chance Gas" building facade

- Front Lot
