= Disneyland: The First 50 Magical Years =

Former exhibition at Disneyland

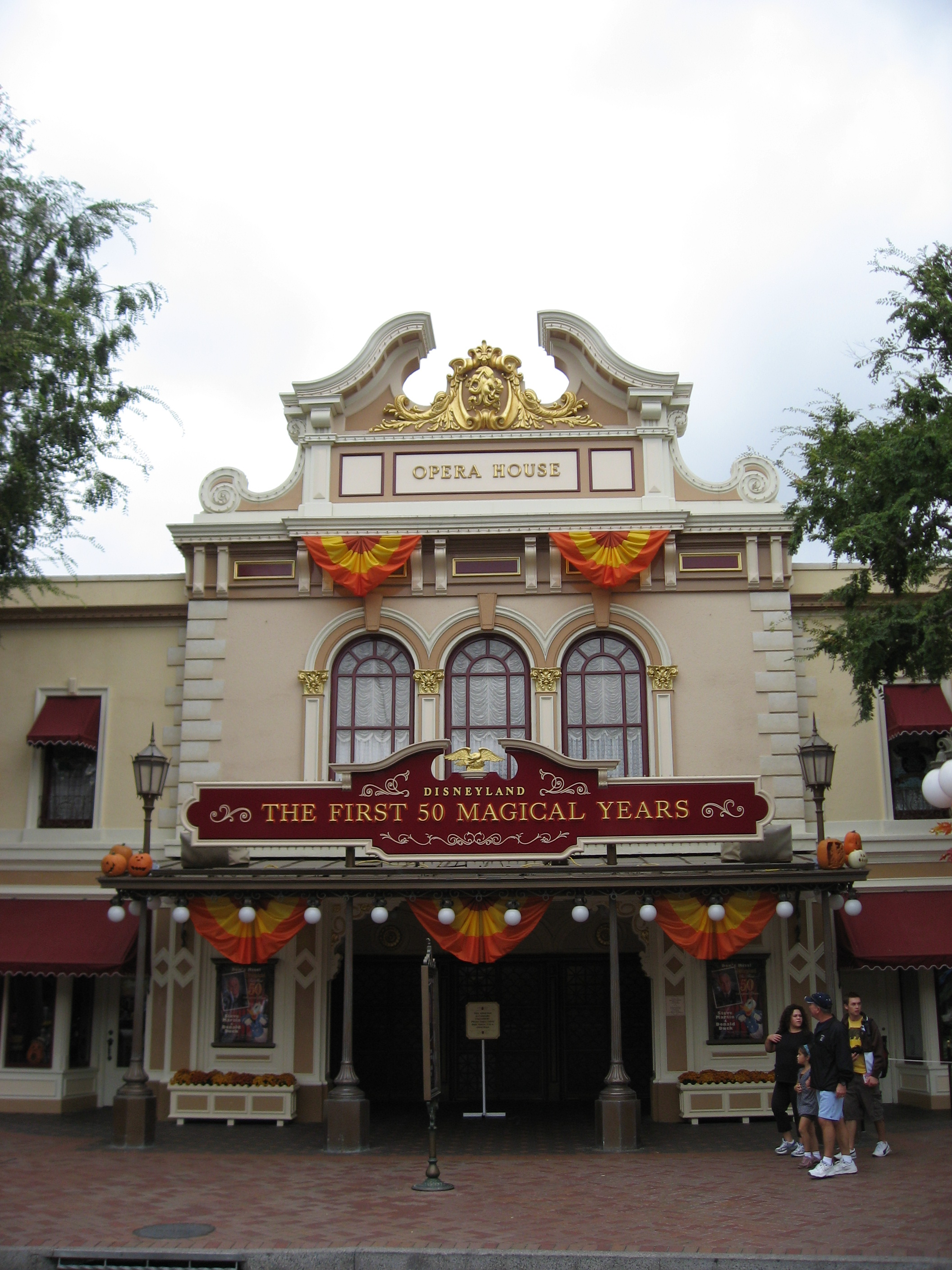

Disneyland
- Area: Main Street, U.S.A.
- Status: Removed
- Opening date: May 5, 2005
- Closing date: March 15, 2009
- Replaced: The Walt Disney Story featuring Great Moments with Mr. Lincoln
- Replaced by: The Disneyland Story presenting Great Moments with Mr. Lincoln

Ride statistics
- Attraction type: Theater presentation
- Designer: WED Enterprises
- Duration: 17 minutes
- Hosted by: Steve Martin (featuring Donald Duck)
- Film director(s): Jerry Rees (live action) and George Scribner (animation)
- Wheelchair accessible
- Assistive listening available
- Closed captioning available

Disneyland: The First 50 Magical Years was an exhibit about the history of Disneyland. It was located on Main Street, U.S.A. in the Opera House, which since 1965 had housed Great Moments with Mr. Lincoln. In the lobby are displays featuring models, photos, concept art and sculptures associated with many Disneyland attractions. There was also a scale model of Disneyland as it appeared in the summer of the opening year 1955.

Steve Martin and Donald Duck in Disneyland: The First 50 Magical Years

The second portion of the attraction was a film which was shown in the Opera House's theater. It featured Steve Martin, who once worked at Merlin's Magic Shop in Fantasyland, and Donald Duck. The film was a 17-minute-long humorous look at how Disneyland has changed throughout the years.

This attraction premiered on May 5, 2005, and closed on March 15, 2009, to make way for the return of Mr. Lincoln which opened on December 18, 2009.

The film Disneyland: The First 50 Magical Years has been shown on a wide-screen television in the Opera House lobby since September 26, 2009. From 2009 to 2013 some scenes were cut for unknown reasons. The shortened version also provided show timing to the Cast Member running the "Great Moments with Mr. Lincoln" attraction. When the edited "First 50 Magical Years" ends, it was a cue for the Cast Member to invite guests inside the Opera House to move into the north end of the lobby, and to begin the preshow for "Great Moments with Mr. Lincoln". Beginning in 2013 the film began playing in its entirety. Beginning in October 18, 2023, the film was replaced with a screening of the live-action/animated short, Once Upon a Studio.

== See also ==
- List of former Disneyland attractions
