= A Christmas Fantasy Parade =

Parade at Disneyland

Disneyland
- Area: Main Street U.S.A., Fantasyland
- Status: Operating
- Opening date: November 28, 1995

Ride statistics
- Attraction type: Parade
- Theme: Christmas
- Wheelchair accessible

A Christmas Fantasy Parade or Christmas Fantasy Parade is an annual parade presented at Disneyland Park in the Disneyland Resort in Anaheim, California. The parade is a holiday parade that runs from mid-November until the weekend after New Year's Day. It debuted during the 1995 Holiday Season, replacing the "Very Merry Christmas Parade". The parade features several Christmas themed floats and a catchy soundtrack, along with favorite Disney characters such as Mickey, Minnie, Donald, Pluto, Goofy, Clarabelle, Elsa, Anna, Olaf, Woody, Buzz Lightyear, Belle, the Beast, Snow White and her Prince, Princess Aurora, Prince Phillip, Cinderella, Prince Charming, Ariel, Prince Eric and the Babes in Toyland soldiers. Earlier versions of the parade included Scrooge McDuck, Roger Rabbit, Max Goof, Winnie the Pooh, Tigger, Eeyore, characters from Lilo & Stitch, The Hunchback of Notre Dame, Mulan, Aladdin and also young children.

Its counterpart at the Magic Kingdom in Walt Disney World is the Mickey's Once Upon a Christmastime Parade that is part of Mickey's Very Merry Christmas Party.
