= Fantasyland Theatre =

Outdoor theater at Disneyland

- The venue currently hosts "Bluey's Best Day Ever!", based on the Australian television series Bluey
- Interactive map of Fantasyland Theatre
- Former names: Videopolis (1985–1995); Fantasyland Theater (1995–2013)
- Location: Disneyland
- Coordinates: 33.8146°N 117.9191°W
- Owner: Disney Parks
- Capacity: 1,800

Construction
- Opened: June 22, 1985

The Fantasyland Theatre, formerly Videopolis, is a 5,000-square-foot (460 m^{2}) outdoor amphitheater at Disneyland in Anaheim, California. Located in Fantasyland, it has 1,800 seats and functions as a venue for various shows. In 1995, the location was renamed to the Fantasyland Theater with the opening of The Spirit of Pocahontas. In 2013, it was renamed to the English-classic spelling, Fantasyland Theatre, with the opening of the venue's show Mickey and the Magical Map.

== Predecessor ==
The original Fantasyland Theater (different spelling) opened in 1956 as the Mickey Mouse Club Theater. This theater presented a short film, 3D Jamboree, a 3D film featuring specially filmed footage of the Mouseketeers from The Mickey Mouse Club. Additionally the program showcased the Donald Duck cartoon short Working For Peanuts and Adventures in Music: Melody. It was the first 3D show in a Disney park.

In 1965 it was renamed Fantasyland Theater. In 1981, it shut down in preparation for construction of the revamped Fantasyland and was then replaced with Pinocchio's Daring Journey in 1983.

== History ==
The venue as it appeared in the early 1990s

Videopolis opened on June 22, 1985, a short distance to the west of It's a Small World. During the day, the theater was used for theme-park shows, but in the evening, it was used as a dance club with music videos. It featured 70 video monitors that displayed music videos and/or live feeds that allowed guests to watch themselves. Some DJs from local radio station KROQ would also appear during the music video segments. The venue included a snack bar called "Yumz" opening on June 19.

Disneyland was successfully sued on two separate occasions by members of the LGBT community in 1985 due to dancing between the same-sex being prohibited at the club. The policy was dropped in 1985.

The Children's Miracle Network Telethon also made use of Videopolis from 1982 to 1993. The show's hosts included singer and The Dukes of Hazzard actor John Schneider, Marie Osmond, Entertainment Tonight co-host Mary Hart, impressionist Rich Little, Olympic Gold Medalist Mary Lou Retton, Pro Football Hall of Famer Merlin Olsen, and the 5th Dimension's Marilyn McCoo and Billy Davis Jr.

On January 29, 2020, the Videopolis dance club was briefly revived for the Disneyland After Dark: 80s Nite event.

In October 2020, it was reported that Mickey and the Magical Map along with Frozen – Live at the Hyperion at Disney California Adventure would not return when the parks reopened.

On November 7, 2024, it was announced that a new holiday shows, Holiday Fun with Santa and Friends!, would be premiere on November 15, 2024 in Fantasyland Theatre, as part of "Holidays at Disneyland" celebration.

In December 2025, it was announced that "Bluey's Best Day Ever!", based on the Australian television series Bluey, would premiere in Fantasyland Theatre on March 22, 2026.

=== Disneyland Park Paris ===
In Discoveryland at Disneyland Park Paris, Videopolis is a large complex housing the Videopolis Theatre and the Hyperion Café counter service restaurant. It features one of the largest props in the resort: the Hyperion airship.

== Shows ==
=== As Videopolis ===
- The Magic of Christmas (Christmas Seasons 1985 – 1988)
- Sing'in' Dance'in' Heigh Ho (1987)
- Circus Fantasy (1988)
- Show Biz Is (1989)
- One Man's Dream, a celebration of Walt Disney (December 16, 1989 – April 29, 1990)
- Dick Tracy in Diamond Double-Cross (June 15, 1990 – December 31, 1990)
- Plane Crazy, with characters from TaleSpin and other Disney Afternoon shows. (March 15, 1991 – September 1991)
- Mickey's Nutcracker (Christmas Seasons 1991 & 1992)
- Beauty and the Beast Live on Stage (April 12, 1992 – April 30, 1995)

=== As Fantasyland Theater ===
- The Spirit of Pocahontas (June 23, 1995 – September 4, 1997)
- Animazment - The Musical (June 18, 1998 – October 21, 2001)
- Minnie's Christmas Party (Christmas Seasons 2001 & 2002)
- Mickey's Detective School (2002 – 2003)
- Snow White: An Enchanting Musical (February 2004 – September 2006)
- Disney Princess Fantasy Faire (October 2006 – August 2012)

=== As Fantasyland Theatre ===
- Mickey and the Magical Map (May 25, 2013 – October 9, 2020)
- Tale of the Lion King (May 28, 2022 – January 7, 2024)
- Pixar Pals Playtime Party (April 26, 2024 – August 21, 2025)
- Holiday Fun with Santa and Friends (November 15, 2024 – January 6, 2025)
- Bluey's Best Day Ever! (March 22, 2026 – present)

== Television ==
- During the 1991 and 1992 holiday seasons, Mickey's Nutcracker was televised on the Disney Channel.
- In 1998, some of the live segments of The Wiggles Live at Disneyland were televised on the Disney Channel in Australia.
- In 2022, April season, Party Gustavo Live at Disneyland were televised on the Disney Junior in Australia.
