= Pixie Hollow =

Meet and greet at Disney theme parks

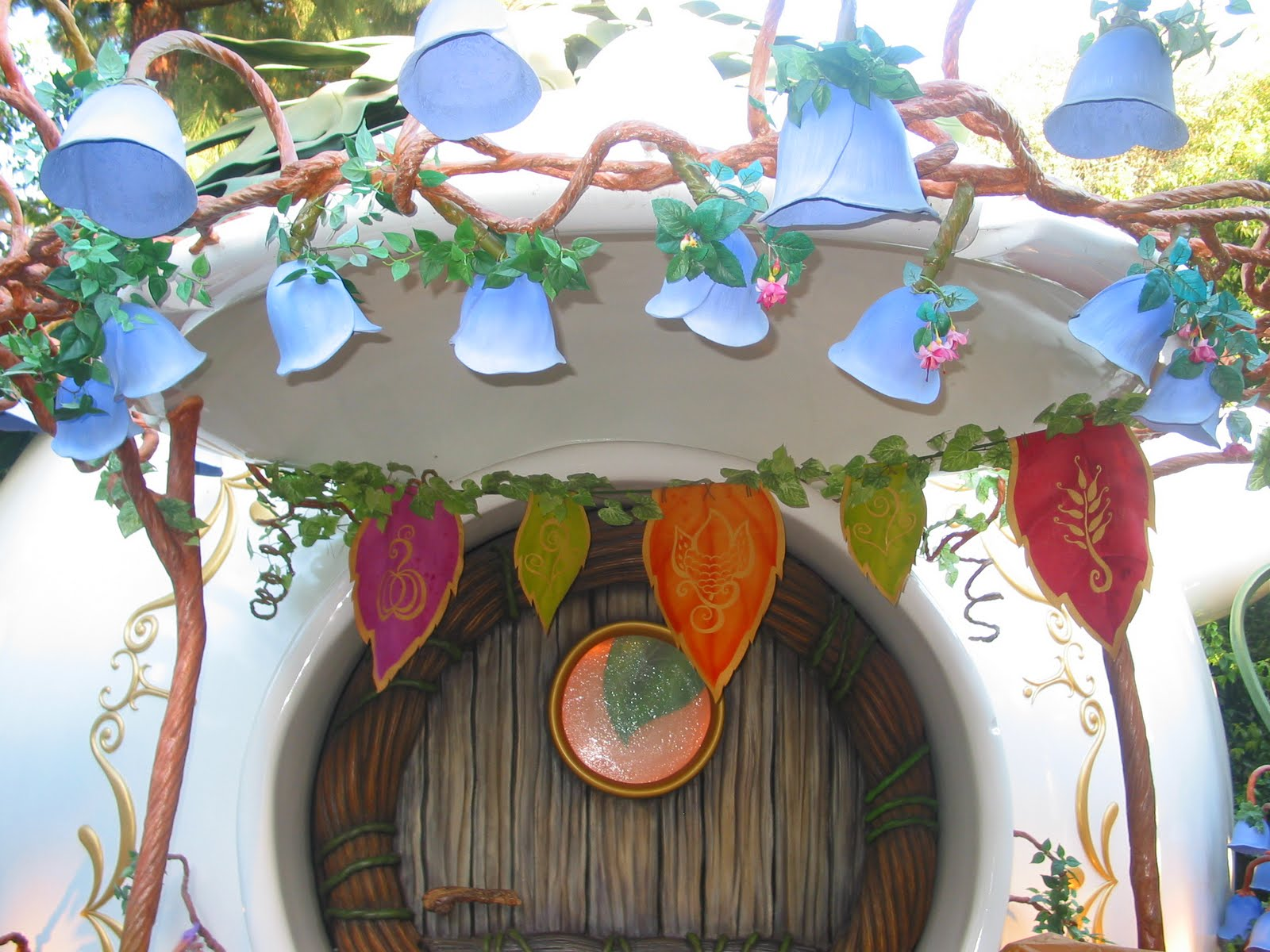
- Tinker Bell's house at Pixie Hollow at Disneyland

Disneyland
- Area: Fantasyland
- Status: Operating
- Opening date: October 28, 2008
- Replaced: Ariel's Grotto

Magic Kingdom
- Name: Tinker Bell's Magical Nook
- Area: Mickey's Toontown Fair (2008–2011); Adventureland (2011–2014)
- Status: Removed
- Opening date: October 28, 2008 (original version); July 28, 2011 (second version)
- Closing date: February 28, 2011 (original version); May 20, 2014 (second version)
- Replaced by: Pete's Silly Sideshow (original version); Skipper Canteen (second version)

Hong Kong Disneyland
- Area: Fantasyland
- Status: Operating
- Soft opening date: December 11, 2015 (part of Fairy Tale Forest)
- Opening date: January 21, 2011 (original version); December 17, 2015 (part of Fairy Tale Forest)
- Closing date: December 14, 2015 (original version)

Ride statistics
- Attraction type: Meet & Greet attraction
- Theme: Disney Fairies

Pixie Hollow is a character meet and greet with Tinker Bell attraction at Disneyland and Hong Kong Disneyland. The attraction is designed to create the illusion of gradually shrinking to Pixie size as the scenic elements in the queue increase in scale as guests approach Tinker Bell's teapot house.

== Disneyland ==
Beneath the Pixie Hollow signage, there is a large block of concrete painted with Disney's "Go Away Green" paint, a signature paint color the company uses to disguise or hide objects from the view of park visitors. This area's cement is the last remaining footprint of the now-gone Monsanto House of the Future attraction which was previously located in the adjacent Tomorrowland section from 1957 to 1967. Removal of the solid cement base was deemed to be too troublesome, thus it was painted with the patented "Go Away Green" color and covered by vegetation.

In 2008, Pixie Hollow replaced a former meet-and-greet area, Ariel's Grotto. A fountain, once located in the pond, contained a statue of King Triton which would spray water from the end of his trident. The statue was subsequently relocated and placed atop a newer attraction, The Little Mermaid: Ariel's Undersea Adventure, located next-door at Disney California Adventure.

== Magic Kingdom ==
The Pixie Hollow area within Mickey's Toontown Fair (at Magic Kingdom, Walt Disney World Resort, Florida) closed in February 2011, as part of the park's New Fantasyland expansion. A larger Pixie Hollow area was included in the original plans for the expansion, although these have since been abandoned. On July 28, 2011, Tinker Bell and her friends returned to the Magic Kingdom at Tinker Bell's Magical Nook, located in the Adventureland Veranda. The attraction closed on May 20, 2014. There is now a meet-and-greet area for Tinker Bell inside the Town Square Theater in the park's Main Street U.S.A. entrance plaza.

== Hong Kong Disneyland ==
While Pixie Hollow originally premiered in the park in 2011, the 10th anniversary celebration of Hong Kong Disneyland involved the opening of a new version of the area, as part of Fairy Tale Forest (an entrance between The Garden of Cinderella and The Garden of Little Mermaid). This new walk through attraction opened on December 17, 2015.

== See also ==
- 2011 in amusement parks
