= The World According to Goofy =

The World According To Goofy was a parade at Disneyland which opened in June 1992 and closed about five months later to begin a 3-month refurbishment in the It's a Small World area, which included repainting the façade to a different color and adding a gift shop. It contained floats showing the history of the world with Goofy-esqe characters portraying real ones. For example, one of the floats showed a large dinosaur that had some of Goofy's features, called the "Goofasaurus". The parade was shown in celebration of Goofy's 60th birthday.

== Parade units ==
- Opening Unit: The float was themed to Ludwig Von Drake standing on a teacher's desk piled with history books, alongside school students dancing with books.
- The Pre-Hysterical Age: The floats featured dinosaurs, cavepeople from the "Tar Bath Resort," and a Buddy Geyser band playing with Goofy. A Brontosaurus with Goofy's face appeared at the end of the unit.
- Egyptian Daze: The floats consisted of Ancient Egypt as a golfing tournament. It featured the Pharaoh Golf Champion "King Putt", Clarabelle Cow as Cleopatra, a Goofy Sphinx, a Goofy mummy emerging from a pyramid, and a Goofy-faced golfball.
- The Renais-Sauce: The float focused on food, with paintings featuring the discovery of fried chicken, and the "Leaning Tower of Pizza," with roller-skating chefs carrying stacks of pizzas.
- Goofy Runs for President: The closing units consisted of Goofy physically "marathon-running" for president, with his friends Donald, Pluto, Chip and Dale riding in "Goofy's Pace Bus," with a dance crew participating in the marathon. Goofy, Mickey, Minnie and Max rode on a Finish Line-styled float with a giant Uncle Sam Goofy inflatable. Near the end of the parade's run, following the 1992 elections (which the unit parodied), the unit instead featured Goofy becoming "Man of the Year."

== See also ==
- List of former Disneyland attractions
- Mickey Mania, A parade similar to this parade that ran from 1995 to 1996 at Magic Kingdom
