= List of Tokyo Disneyland attractions =

This is a list of attractions at Tokyo Disneyland in Urayasu, Chiba, Japan.

== World Bazaar ==
=== Former attractions ===
- The Disney Gallery

== Adventureland ==
- Jungle Cruise: Wildlife Expeditions
- Pirates of the Caribbean
- The Enchanted Tiki Room: Stitch Presents Aloha e Komo Mai!
- Western River Railroad

=== Former attractions ===
- Jungle Cruise
- Swiss Family Treehouse
- The Enchanted Tiki Room

== Westernland ==
- Big Thunder Mountain
- Grizzly Hall Theatre
  - Country Bear Theater
    - Jingle Bell Jamboree (seasonal)
    - Vacation Jamboree (seasonal)
- Rivers of America
  - Mark Twain Riverboat
  - Tom Sawyer Island Rafts
- Westernland Shootin' Gallery

== Critter Country ==
- Rivers of America
  - Beaver Brothers Explorer Canoes
- Splash Mountain

== Fantasyland ==
- Alice's Tea Party
- Castle Carrousel
- Cinderella Castle
- Cinderella's Fairy Tale Hall
- Dumbo the Flying Elephant
- Enchanted Tale of Beauty and the Beast
- Haunted Mansion
  - Haunted Mansion Holiday Nightmare (seasonal)
- Fantasyland Concert Hall
  - Mickey's PhilharMagic
- It's a Small World
  - It's a Small World with Groot (seasonal)
- Peter Pan's Flight
- Pinocchio's Daring Journey
- Pooh's Hunny Hunt
- Snow White's Enchanted Wish
- Snow White Grotto
- Fantasyland Forest Theatre
  - Mickey's Magical Music World

=== Former attractions ===
- Fantasyland Concert Hall
  - Mickey Mouse Revue

== Toontown ==
- Gadget's Go Coaster
- Mickey's House and Meet Mickey
- Roger Rabbit's Car Toon Spin

== Tomorrowland ==
- Star Tours – The Adventures Continue
- Stitch Encounter
- Monsters, Inc. Ride & Go Seek
- The Happy Ride with Baymax

=== Upcoming attractions ===
- Sugar Rush: Sweet Rescue (Opening on April 15, 2027)
- Space Mountain: Earthrise (Reopening in 2027)

=== Former attractions ===
- Magic Eye Theater
  - Eternal Sea
  - Magic Journeys
  - Captain EO
  - MicroAdventure!
- Circle-Vision 360°
  - Magic Carpet 'Round the World
  - American Journeys
  - Visionarium
- Grand Circuit Raceway
- Meet the World
- Star Tours
- Star Jets
- ShowBase
  - Club Mouse Beat
  - One Man's Dream
  - One Man's Dream II: The Magic Lives On
- Buzz Lightyear's Astro Blasters
- Space Mountain

== Parade ==
- Tokyo Disneyland Electrical Parade: Dreamlights

== Fireworks ==
- Sky Full of Colors

=== Seasonals ===
- Night High Halloween

=== Former Fireworks ===
- Fantasy in the Sky
- Stardust Fantasy
- Starlight Fantasy
- Starlight Magic
- New Century in the Sky
- Disney Magic In the Sky
- Once Upon a Time
- Reach for the Stars

==== Seasonals ====
- Celebrate! Tokyo Disneyland
- Reach for the Stars: Everlasting Dreams
