= The Barnstormer =

Roller coaster at Disney's Magic Kingdom

- Previously known as The Barnstormer at Goofy's Wiseacre Farm (1996–2011)

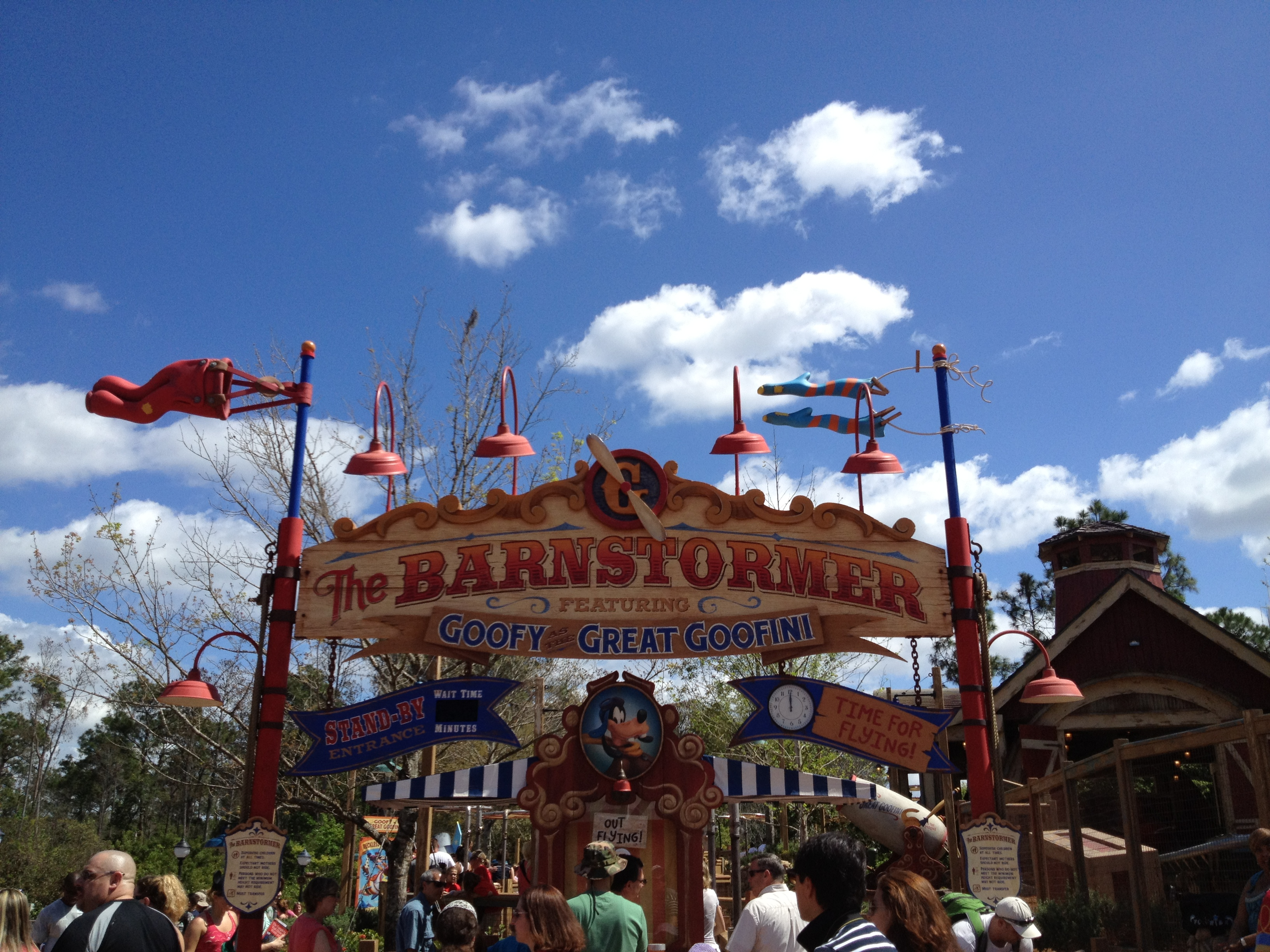
- Sign for The Barnstormer, after its relaunch.

Magic Kingdom
- Location: Magic Kingdom
- Park section: Fantasyland - Storybook Circus (as of 2012)
- Coordinates: 28.420496°N 81.578423°W
- Status: Operating
- Opening date: October 1, 1996 (original); March 12, 2012 (relaunch)
- Closing date: February 12, 2011 (original)

General statistics
- Type: Steel – Junior
- Manufacturer: Vekoma
- Designer: Walt Disney Imagineering
- Model: Junior Coaster (Custom)
- Lift/launch system: Chain lift hill
- Height: 9.1 m (30 ft)
- Length: 207 m (679 ft)
- Speed: 40.2 km/h (25.0 mph)
- Inversions: 0
- Duration: 0:53
- Height restriction: 35 in (89 cm)
- Trains: 2 trains with 8 cars; riders arranged 2 across in a single row for a total of 16 riders per train
- Lightning Lane available
- Must transfer from wheelchair
- The Barnstormer at RCDB

The Barnstormer, also known as The Barnstormer featuring Goofy as the Great Goofini, is a junior roller coaster. It is located in the Storybook Circus section of the Magic Kingdom at the Walt Disney World Resort. It is the successor to The Barnstormer at Goofy's Wiseacre Farm which closed in February 2011 as part of the Fantasyland expansion.

== History ==
=== Grandma Duck's Petting Farm (1988–1996) ===
A petting zoo named Grandma Duck's Petting Farm previously occupied the site where The Barnstormer now sits. This petting zoo was located in the Mickey's Birthdayland section of Fantasyland and was home to Minnie Moo, a holstein cow that was famous for having a Hidden Mickey on her side. In 1996 the petting zoo was removed and Minnie Moo was relocated to Fort Wilderness. She later died from natural causes. The barn which housed the petting zoo was integrated into The Barnstormer at Goofy's Wiseacre Farm.

=== The Barnstormer at Goofy's Wiseacre Farm (1996–2011) ===
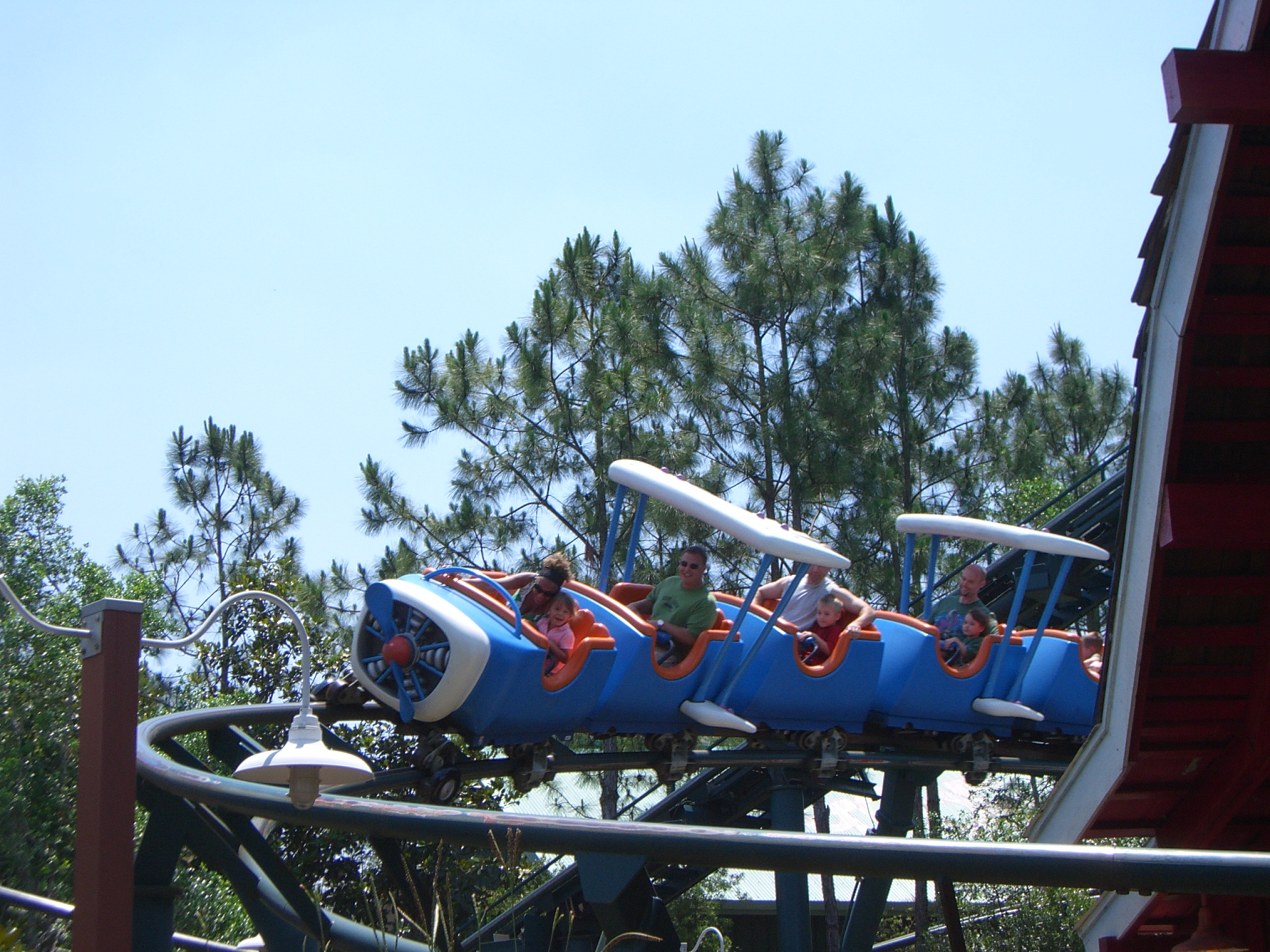
One of the Barnstormer's trains going through a turn when the trains were painted blue and white with orange before it was repainted with red and brown for the current ride

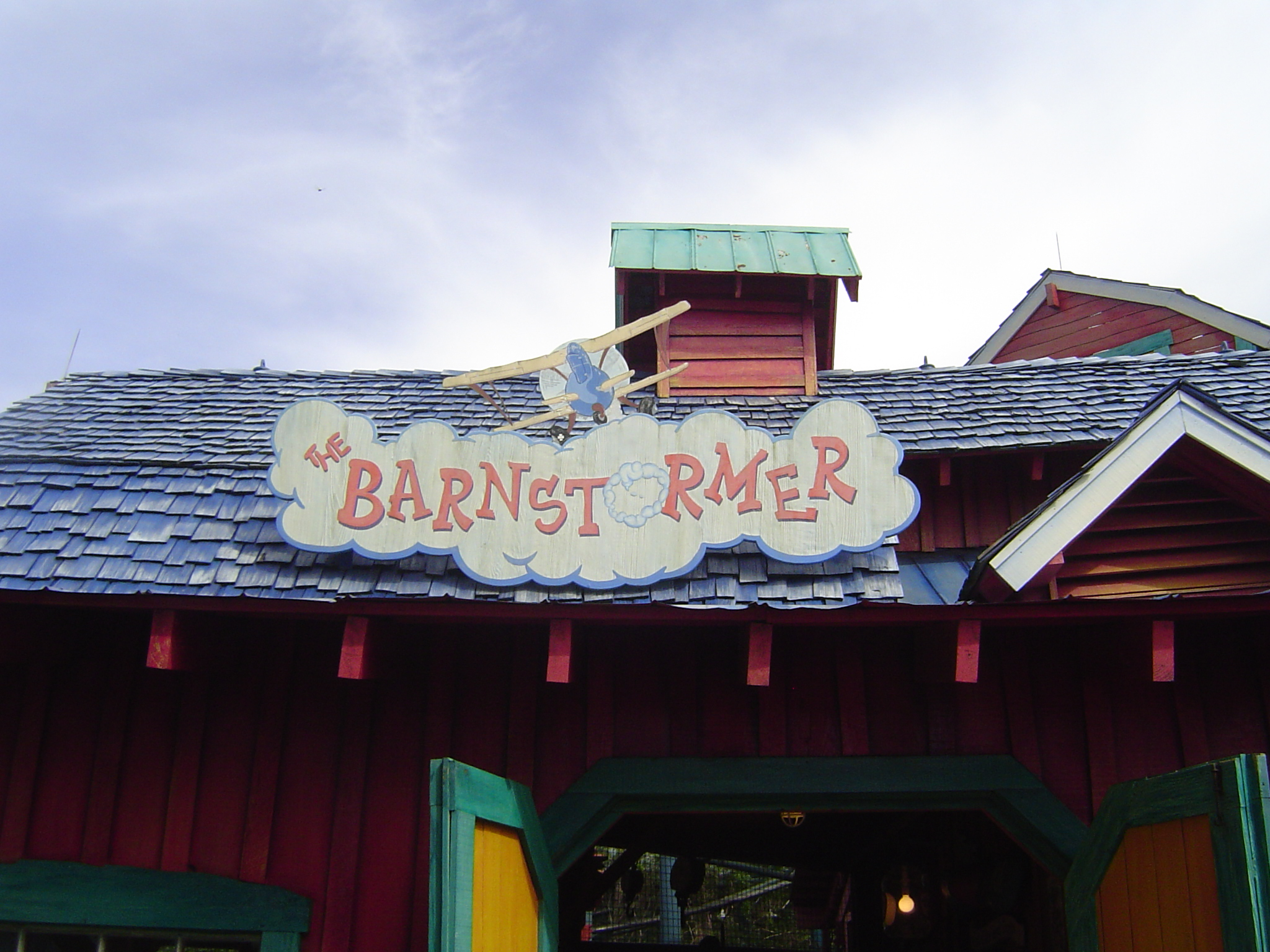
The former entrance to the Barnstormer when the "cloud" logo was still in use before the crash-through billboard was added in 2012

After the closure of Grandma Duck's Petting Farm in early 1996, the Magic Kingdom began construction on a junior roller coaster called The Barnstormer at Goofy's Wiseacre Farm. It opened in Mickey's Toontown Fair on October 1, 1996. The Barnstormer was one of three attractions at American Disney parks which took its name from former attractions at the now-defunct Opryland USA theme park in Nashville, Tennessee. The other two attractions are Grizzly River Run at Disney California Adventure Park and Rock 'n' Roller Coaster at Disney's Hollywood Studios.

The Barnstormer at Goofy's Wiseacre Farm appeared to be an airplane school taught by Goofy. The story behind this ride included guests flying in Goofy's homemade biplane as it swooped, twisted and turned. It then went full speed into a barn. Inside the barn were three Audio-Animatronic chickens from Epcot's former World of Motion attraction. A Hidden Mickey formed by a jumble of wires could be found in the attraction's queue near the "popcorn plants".

As part of the Fantasyland expansion, the attraction closed on February 12, 2011 to be rethemed to the Great Goofini.

=== The Barnstormer (2011–present) ===
From 2011 to 2014, Magic Kingdom's Fantasyland underwent a large expansion and renovation. Mickey's Toontown Fair closed permanently on February 12, 2011 in order to make way for the expansion. Some elements of Mickey's Toontown Fair have been demolished and others have been re-themed to a new Storybook Circus area. The Barnstormer at Goofy's Wiseacre Farm was re-themed to The Barnstormer featuring Goofy as the Great Goofini. New Fantasyland opened in stages. The first stage, which opened in early 2012, contained the first half of Storybook Circus, including the new re-themed Barnstormer, at which the crash-out barn had been removed. On the back of the entrance sign, however, one can find a set of red painted jumbled letters that, when put together, spell Wiseacre Farm as an homage to both the original version of the ride and Mickey's Toontown Fair.

== Ride ==
Guests board one of two trains which each seat 16 riders. The train is taken up a chain lift hill to a height of 9.1 meters (30 ft). 207 meters (679 ft) of twists, turns, and elevation changes follow, before the ride comes to a halt in the brake run. Riders reach a top speed of 40.2 kilometers per hour (25.0 mph) on the forty-second ride.

== See also ==
- 2012 in amusement parks
- Gadget's Go Coaster, a similar ride at Mickey's Toontown in Disneyland and Toontown in Tokyo Disneyland.
- Goofy's Sky School, a similarly-themed ride at Disney California Adventure.
