= One Man's Dream II: The Magic Lives On =

Former live stage show at Tokyo Disneyland

Tokyo Disneyland
- Area: Tomorrowland
- Status: Removed
- Opening date: July 3, 2004
- Closing date: December 13, 2019
- Replaced: Club Mouse Beat

Ride statistics
- Attraction type: Live stage show
- Wheelchair accessible

One Man's Dream II: The Magic Lives On was a live stage show located at Tomorrowland of Tokyo Disneyland at the Tokyo Disney Resort in Urayasu, Chiba, Japan. The show was located at the Showbase 2000 adjacent to Space Mountain. The show is a sequel and an adaptation to the original One Man's Dream, formerly at Tokyo Disneyland from 1988 to 1995 and also at Disneyland in Anaheim, California from 1989 to 1990. The show ended its run on December 13, 2019.

== Plot ==
Segments are in order of occurrence

- Opening: It begins with a black and white Mickey Mouse visiting Minnie Mouse to give her flowers that flash into color with a kiss given to Mickey by Minnie. The two rush into Minnie's home to see it sparking with color and several groups of Disney characters inside.
- Jungle: King Louie from The Jungle Book and Terk from Tarzan get together for a wild dance number. Terk sports a Hawaiian outfit as does King Louie.
- A Bug's Life: The segment features the ant colony from the Disney-Pixar film A Bug's Life working and collecting food as well as P.T. Flea's circus performers.
- Peter Pan: Peter Pan battles Captain Hook and his pirate crew to rescue Wendy. Soon enough, Captain Hook is chased away by the Crocodile. The segment ends with Peter and Wendy flying into the skies and singing a duet.
- Villains: The Queen from Snow White and the Seven Dwarfs summons Maleficent from Sleeping Beauty and Claude Frollo from The Hunchback of Notre Dame to showcase fire, evil and anything they decide to create. It features Maleficent's goons as well as the red cloaked men featured during Hellfire. The Queen also becomes the Wicked Witch in the segment.
- Princess: After the evil settles, Prince Philip comes across Princess Aurora and awakens her with a kiss. They begin to waltz and are accompanied by Cinderella, Prince Charming, Snow White and her Prince.
- Hollywood: Donald Duck wishes to win the heart of beautiful starlet Daisy Duck but believes in order to do so, he must become a movie star. He takes a role in a film but becomes frustrated when the crazy cast and crew become even more active. He gives up only to find that Daisy loves him for who he is.
- Finale: Numerous Disney characters come together to a Hollywood premiere to celebrate Mickey Mouse and a certain man's dream. In this scene, they all wear white sparkling outfits.

The original version of the attraction featured The Three Little Pigs, the Big Bad Wolf, and Alice within the plot, while the a revised version featured Stitch, Clara Cluck, and Clarabelle Cow instead.

== See also ==
- Mickey's Royal Friendship Faire was a similar show at Walt Disney World's Magic Kingdom.
