= Mickey's House and Meet Mickey =

Attraction at Disney theme parks

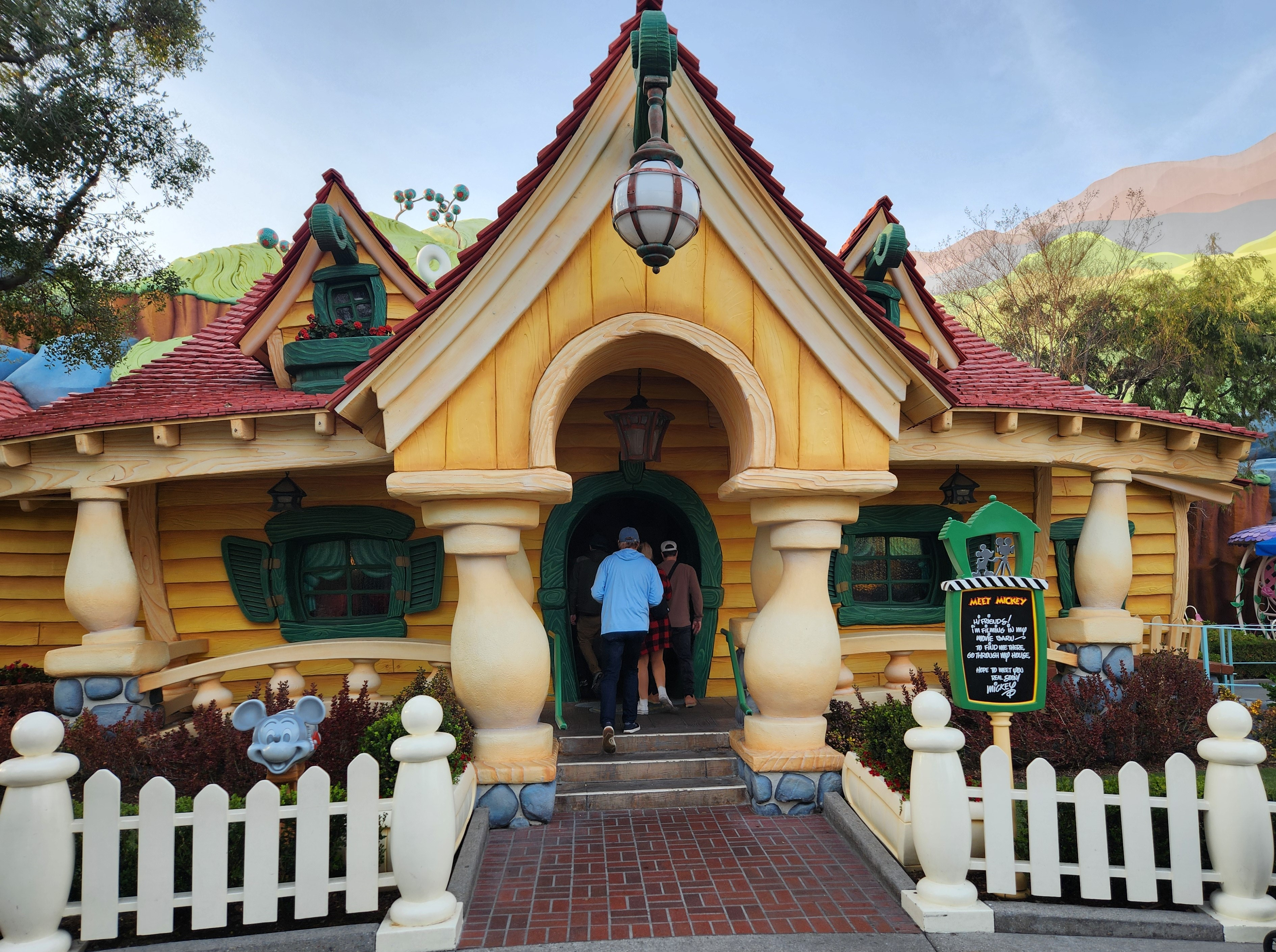
- Mickey's house at Disneyland

Magic Kingdom
- Name: Mickey's Country House
- Area: Mickey's Toontown Fair
- Status: Removed
- Opening date: June 18, 1988
- Closing date: February 12, 2011
- Replaced by: Pete's Silly Sideshow

Disneyland
- Area: Mickey's Toontown
- Status: Operating
- Opening date: January 24, 1993

Tokyo Disneyland
- Area: Toontown
- Status: Operating
- Opening date: April 15, 1996

Hong Kong Disneyland
- Name: Mickey's House
- Area: Main Street, USA
- Status: Removed
- Opening date: January 22, 2008
- Closing date: August 9, 2009
- Replaced by: Royal Princess Garden

Ride statistics
- Attraction type: Walk Through, Meet & Greet
- Theme: Mickey Mouse's home

Mickey's House and Meet Mickey is a walk through and Meet & Greet with Mickey Mouse attraction at Mickey's Toontown in Disneyland and Toontown at Tokyo Disneyland. Similar attractions formerly existed in the Magic Kingdom and Hong Kong Disneyland.

== History ==
This attraction first opened at the Magic Kingdom in 1988 and was named Mickey's Country House. Another version of the attraction opened in 1993 with Mickey's Toontown at Disneyland. Another version of the attraction also opened on April 15, 1996 with Toontown at Tokyo Disneyland.

=== Magic Kingdom ===
At the Magic Kingdom, Mickey's Toontown Fair initially opened as Mickey's Birthdayland on June 18, 1988. It became Mickey's Starland on May 26, 1990, and Mickey's Toontown Fair on October 1, 1996. Its storyline portrayed the land as the holiday home for the characters who reside at Mickey's Toontown in Disneyland. This attraction existed in the land since its opening as Mickey's Birthdayland in 1988. The house changed several times since its opening.

Mickey's Toontown Fair, along with Mickey's Country House, closed in February 2011 in order to make way for the expansion of Fantasyland. Meet Mickey at Town Square Theater, located on Main Street USA in the Magic Kingdom, is now the official location in the park to have a meet and greet with Mickey.

=== Disneyland ===
After the success of Mickey's Starland, Disneyland opened Mickey's Toontown behind It's a Small World. The land features Mickey's House and Meet Mickey along with Minnie's House, Goofy's How-To-Play Yard and Donald's Duck Pond, and also includes Roger Rabbit's Car Toon Spin, Chip 'n' Dale's Gadgetcoaster and Mickey & Minnie's Runaway Railway.

After touring his house, guests pass through a fake garden to enter Mickey’s Movie Barn. The barn is filled with props and costumes from many Mickey Mouse shorts. Guest can either exit back to Toontown or wait to meet Mickey. Guests wanting to meet Mickey wait in the screening room before being called by a cast member. This area used to show fake trailers for different shorts under the illusion they were being filmed there while Donald and Goofy work the projector. As of 2019, guests instead watch the newer Mickey Mouse shorts.

== See also ==
- 2011 in amusement parks
