= Mickey's Toontown =

Themed land at Disney parks

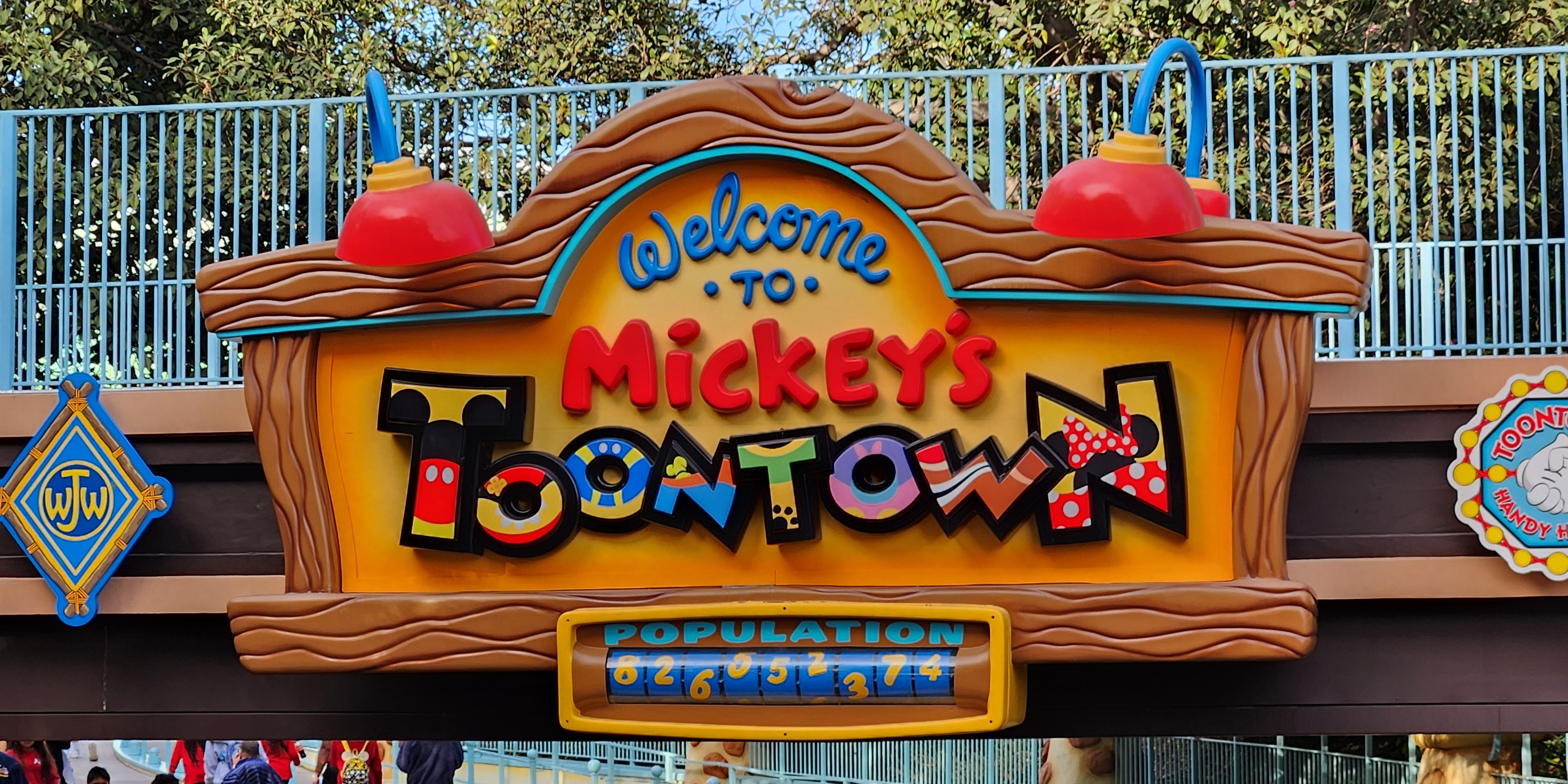
- The Mickey's Toontown sign at Disneyland
- Theme: Mickey Mouse & Friends

Magic Kingdom
- Status: Defunct
- Opened: June 18, 1988
- Closed: February 11, 2011
- Replaced: Portions of Tomorrowland Speedway (Tomorrowland)
- Replaced by: Storybook Circus (as Portions of Fantasyland)

Disneyland
- Status: Operating
- Opened: January 24, 1993

Tokyo Disneyland
- Status: Operating
- Opened: April 15, 1996

Mickey's Toontown is a themed land at Disneyland and Tokyo Disneyland, two theme parks operated by Disney Experiences and The Oriental Land Company respectively. At Tokyo Disneyland, this land is named Toontown. A similar land existed at the Magic Kingdom until 2011 and was named Mickey's Toontown Fair. Walt Disney Studios Park in Disneyland Paris has a related land called Toon Studio.

The attraction is a small-scale recreation of the Mickey Mouse universe where visitors can meet the characters and visit their homes which are constructed in a cartoonish style. It was inspired by "Toontown" from the 1988 film Who Framed Roger Rabbit in which the cartoon characters live alongside humans.

== History ==
Roger Rabbit was recognized as a lucrative character by Disney after the release of Who Framed Roger Rabbit, and a set of attractions based on the movie was developed for Disney theme parks. Roger Rabbit was set to be the star of his own land, behind Main Street, U.S.A. at Disneyland, called Hollywoodland. Meanwhile, at the Magic Kingdom, a new land behind Fantasyland was being developed in honor of Mickey Mouse's sixtieth birthday, named Mickey's Birthdayland. There were also set to be attractions based on Roger Rabbit, Judge Doom, and Baby Herman opening in a major expansion at the Disney's Hollywood Studios and Tokyo Disneyland, but after the financial troubles of the Euro Disney Resort (known today as Disneyland Paris), plans were cut back.

The planned attractions for Hollywood Studios were ultimately canceled, but Hollywoodland and Mickey's Birthdayland concepts (as well as some concepts found in Who Framed Roger Rabbit) were eventually combined to form Mickey's Toontown, which opened in Disneyland in 1993 and a different version at Tokyo Disneyland in 1996. Walt Disney Studios Park in Disneyland Paris features a similar Land, 'Toon Studio'.

One of the most beloved and remembered aspects of the land was its music. Both Disneyland (1993-2022) and Tokyo Disneyland's (since 1996) versions of Toontown featured new musical arrangements based on the classic Disney shorts (and two exceptions). These shorts were: Steamboat Willie, The Skeleton Dance, Springtime, Minnie's Yoo Hoo, Smile, Darn Ya, Smile!, 'Box Lunch' Minnie's song from Building a Building, Three Little Pigs, Puppy Love, The Pied Piper, The Grass Hopper and the Ants, Camping Out, Playful Pluto, Funny Little Bunnies, The Tortoise and the Hare, Who Killed Cock Robin?, Thru the Mirror, The Country Cousin, Pluto's Playmate', Donald and Goofy's respective cartoon themes from the mid 1940s to mid 1950s, Casey at the Bat and Little Toot (segments from Make Mine Music and Melody Time respectively; re-released as standalone shorts in 1954) and the Maroon Cartoon logo theme from Who Framed Roger Rabbit.

Sometime around the 2010s, more arranged music covers were added into the land's music ambiance, all taken straight from Disney's Have a Laugh!. These were: On Ice, Mickey's Polo Team, Thru the Mirror, Clock Cleaners, Moose Hunters, Magician Mickey, Boat Builders, Mickey's Trailer, Polar Trappers, Beach Picnic, Mr. Duck steps Out, Canine Caddy and Double Dribble.

== Magic Kingdom ==
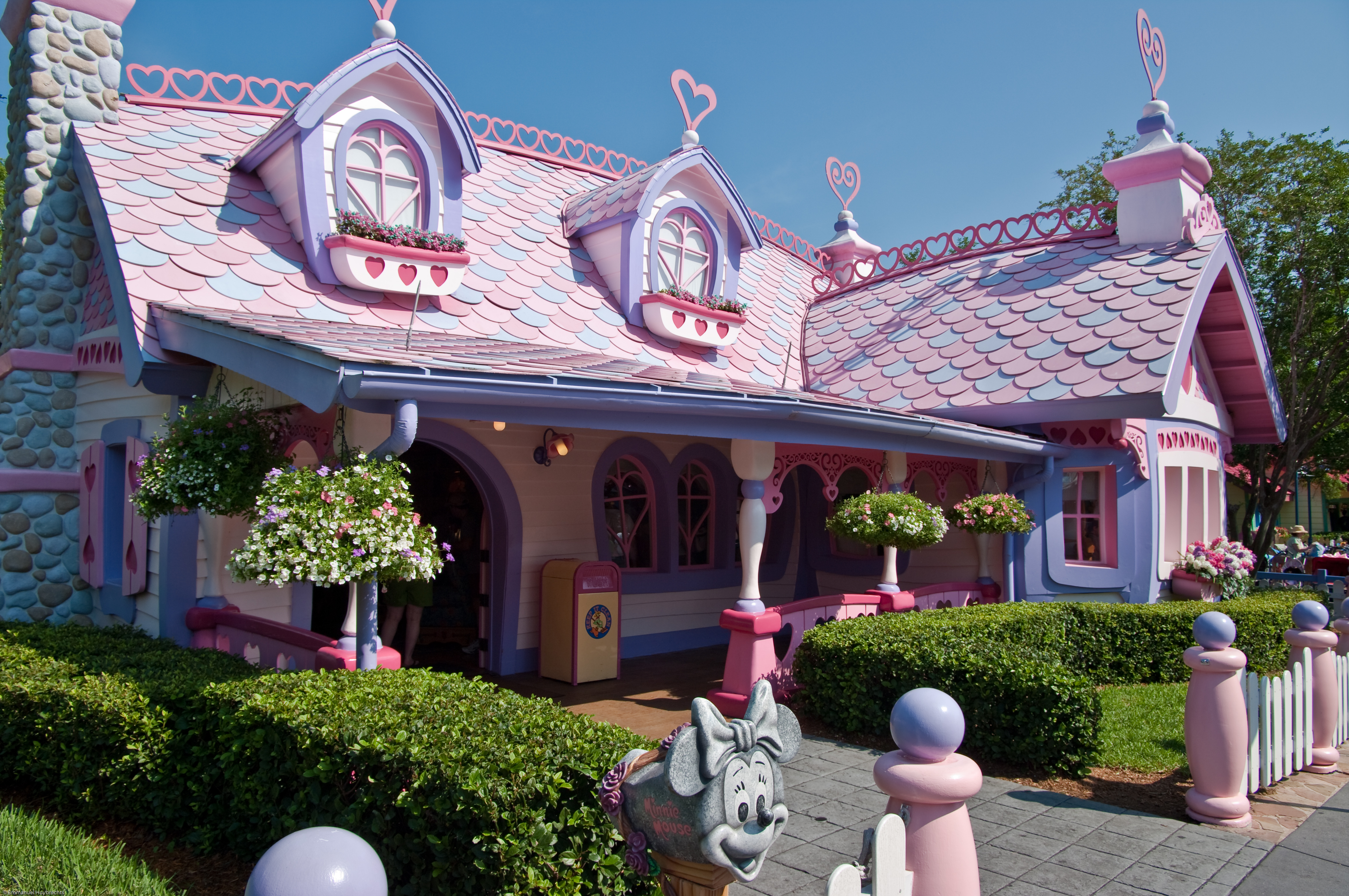
Minnie's Country House as it appeared in Mickey's Toontown Fair

At the Magic Kingdom, Mickey's Toontown Fair (now the Storybook Circus) initially opened as Mickey's Birthdayland on June 18, 1988. It became Mickey's Starland on May 26, 1990, and was briefly renamed Mickey's Toyland in late 1995. The land was closed in early 1996 for an extensive refurbishment, and on October 1, 1996, it reopened as Mickey's Toontown Fair for the park's 25th anniversary.

Mickey's Toontown Fair was closed on February 11, 2011 in order to build the "New Fantasyland" expansion. Some elements of Mickey's Toontown Fair have been demolished and others have been re-themed to a new Storybook Circus area. The Dumbo the Flying Elephant ride was removed from Fantasyland and rebuilt in Storybook Circus, the new version doubling the capacity of the old ride and incorporating an interactive queue. The Barnstormer at Goofy's Wiseacre Farm has been re-themed to The Barnstormer featuring Goofy as the Great Goofini. The first half of Storybook Circus opened on March 12, 2012, which included the newly themed "The Great Goofini", the Storybook Circus train station which was completely rebuilt and also one half of the new Dumbo ride. The second phase of Storybook Circus, including the second half of Dumbo, the indoor queue area, and the Casey Jr Splash 'n' Soak Station opened in June 2012.

=== Former attractions and entertainment ===
- The Barnstormer at Goofy's Wiseacre Farm (rethemed as The Great Goofini's Barnstormer) (1996-2011)
- Donald's Boat (replaced by queue for The Great Goofini's Barnstormer)
- Judge's Tent (replaced by a fast-pass area and sitting area)
- Mickey's Country House (1988-2011)
- Minnie's Country House (replaced by a pathway from Storybook Circus to Enchanted Forest)
- Pixie Hollow (replaced by Pete's Silly Sideshow) (2008-2011)
- Toontown Hall of Fame (replaced by Pete's Silly Sideshow)
- Walt Disney World Railroad - Mickey's Toontown Fair Station (replaced by Walt Disney World Railroad - Fantasyland Station) (1988-2011)

=== Former shops ===
- Cornelius Coot's County Bounty
- Mickey's Toontown Fair Souvenirs
- Toontown Farmer's Market

== Disneyland ==
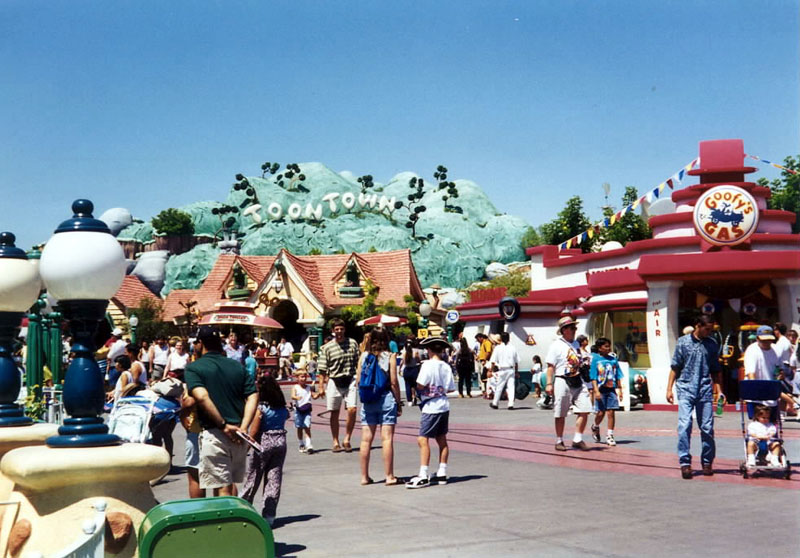
Mickey's Toontown in 1995

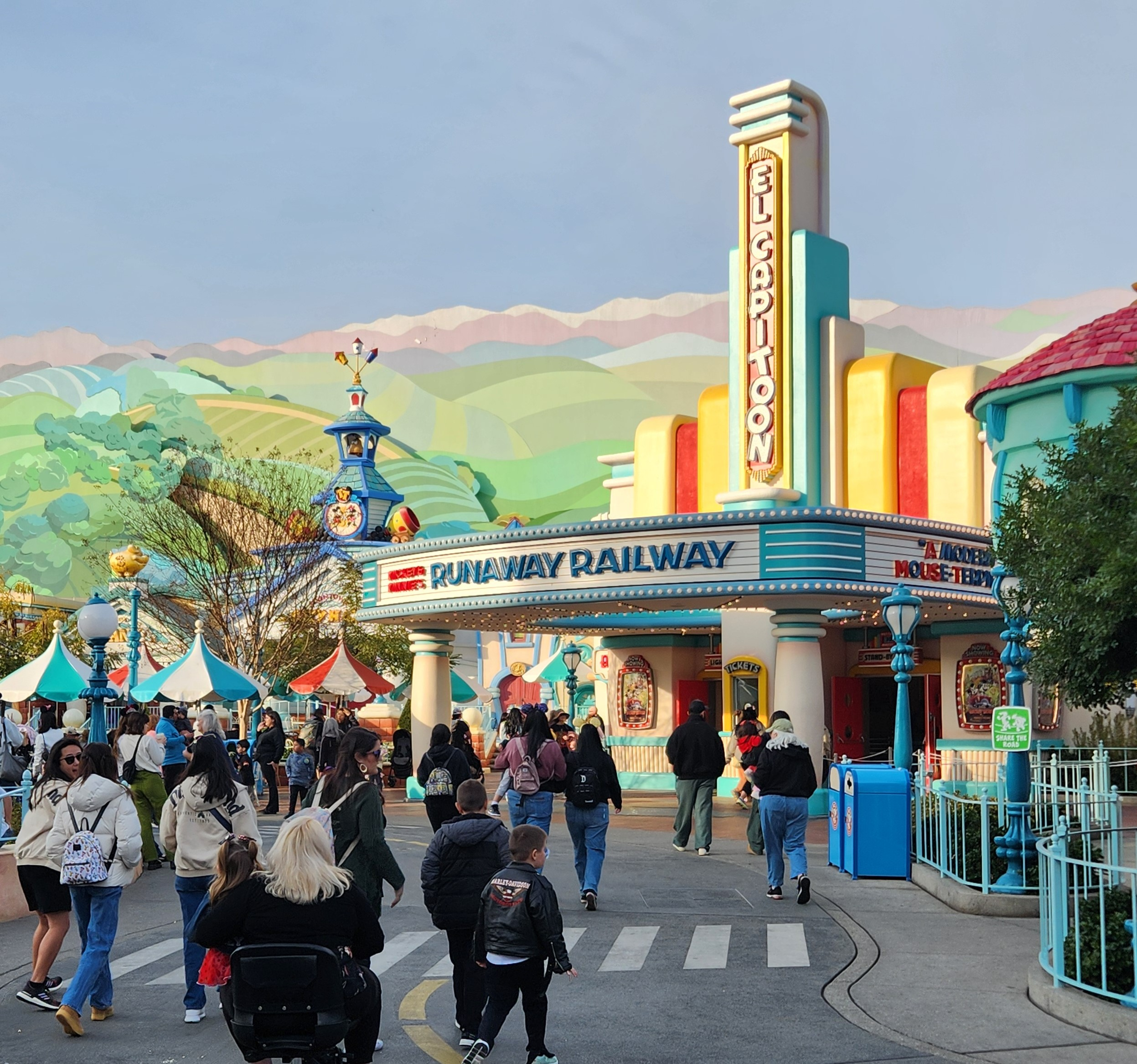
Mickey & Minnie's Runaway Railway, 2025

Mickey's Toontown opened in Disneyland on January 24, 1993. The area is inspired by Who Framed Roger Rabbit (1988) and resembles a set from a Max Fleischer cartoon. The buildings are stylized and colorful. There are several attractions involving classic cartoon characters, such as the houses of Mickey and Minnie Mouse, and a small children's coaster. There are a few interactive gags. The houses themselves appeal primarily as play areas for small children. From 1993 through 2022, one of the windows in the land had a reference to Laugh-O-Gram Studios, the studio that Disney created before Disney Studios.

An early entry event called Toontown Morning Madness was held here for guests booking travel with the American Automobile Association or book a vacation package with the Walt Disney Travel Company. However, Morning Madness has been discontinued as of 2013 as Extra Magic Hour and Magic Morning are now offered. On nights that fireworks are scheduled, the land will close early for the day due to its proximity to the launch area for the fireworks. Mickey's Toontown Depot stays open from park opening to park closing as it also serves as a stop for Fantasyland with the station being next to the Fantasyland Theatre. On non-fireworks days, the land closes with the park.

In April 2019, Disney announced that Mickey & Minnie's Runaway Railway (which opened at Disney's Hollywood Studios in 2020), would open at Mickey's Toontown in Disneyland in 2023. The ride is housed in a building within Toontown called the El CapiTOON Theater, a pun of the El Capitan Theatre in Hollywood which in turn is owned by Disney. The attraction, which replaced the Toontown Five and Dime/Gag Factory store, is the first new attraction added in Toontown since Roger Rabbit's Car Toon Spin opened in 1994.

Disneyland Resort was temporarily closed from 2020 to 2021 due to the COVID-19 pandemic, during which time construction commenced on Mickey & Minnie's Runaway Railway. In November 2021, Disney announced that Mickey's Toontown in Disneyland would receive a makeover and would be closed for a year. The new features include play experiences for children and families. With the addition of Mickey & Minnie's Runaway Railway, a new children's play area was added called CenTOONial Park and features a fountain. In February 2022, it was announced that Gadget's Go Coaster, Goofy's Playhouse and Donald's Boat would be "reimagined". Mickey's Toontown was temporarily closed on March 9, 2022. Mickey & Minnie's Runaway Railway opened on January 27, 2023. The rest of Mickey's Toontown was originally scheduled to open on March 8, 2023, but was later delayed to March 19, 2023. The newly renovated Mickey's Toontown has been designed specifically to accommodate special needs children.

=== Attractions and entertainment ===
- Disneyland Railroad
  - Mickey's Toontown Station
- CenTOONial Park
- Chip 'n' Dale's Gadgetcoaster
- Mickey & Minnie's Runaway Railway
- Mickey's House and Meet Mickey
- Minnie's House
- Goofy's How-To-Play Yard
- Donald's Duck Pond
- Roger Rabbit's Car Toon Spin

=== Former attractions and entertainment ===
- Chip 'n Dale's Acorn Crawl (1993–1998)
- Goofy's Bounce House (1993–2008) (re-themed to Goofy's Playhouse)
- Jolly Trolley (1993–2003)
- Toon Park (1993–2022) (re-themed to CenTOONial Park)
- Chip 'n Dale's Treehouse (1993–2020)
- Goofy's Playhouse (2008-2022) (re-themed to Goofy's How-To-Play Yard)
- Donald's Boat (1993-2022) (re-themed to Donald's Duck Pond)

=== Restaurants and refreshments ===
- Café Daisy
- Good Boy! Grocers
- Popcorn near Chip 'n' Dale's Gadgetcoaster

=== Former restaurants and refreshments ===
- Daisy's Diner (1993-2022)
- Pluto's Dog House (1993-2022)
- Clarabelle's Frozen Yogurt (1993-2022)
- Goofy's Freeze
- Toon Up Treats

=== Shops ===
- EngineEar Souvenirs

=== Former Shops ===
- Toontown Five and Dime (1993–2020)
- Gag Factory (1993–2020)

== Tokyo Disneyland ==
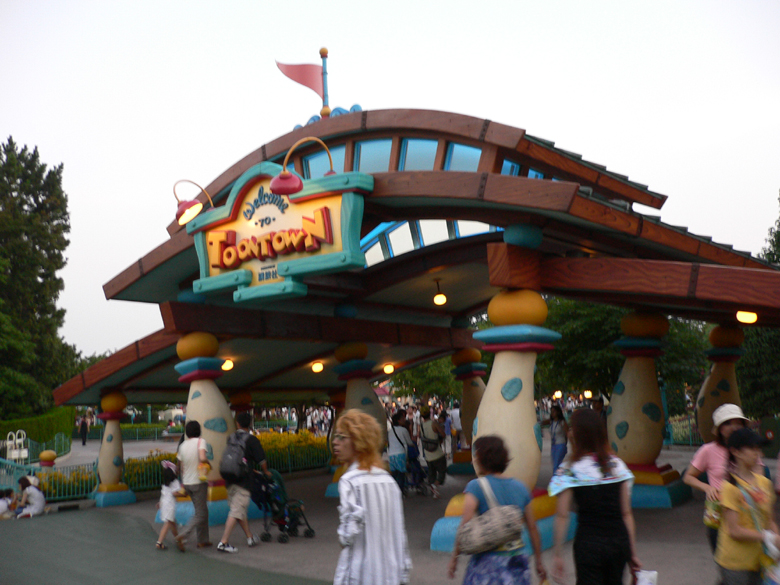
Toontown Entrance at Tokyo Disneyland

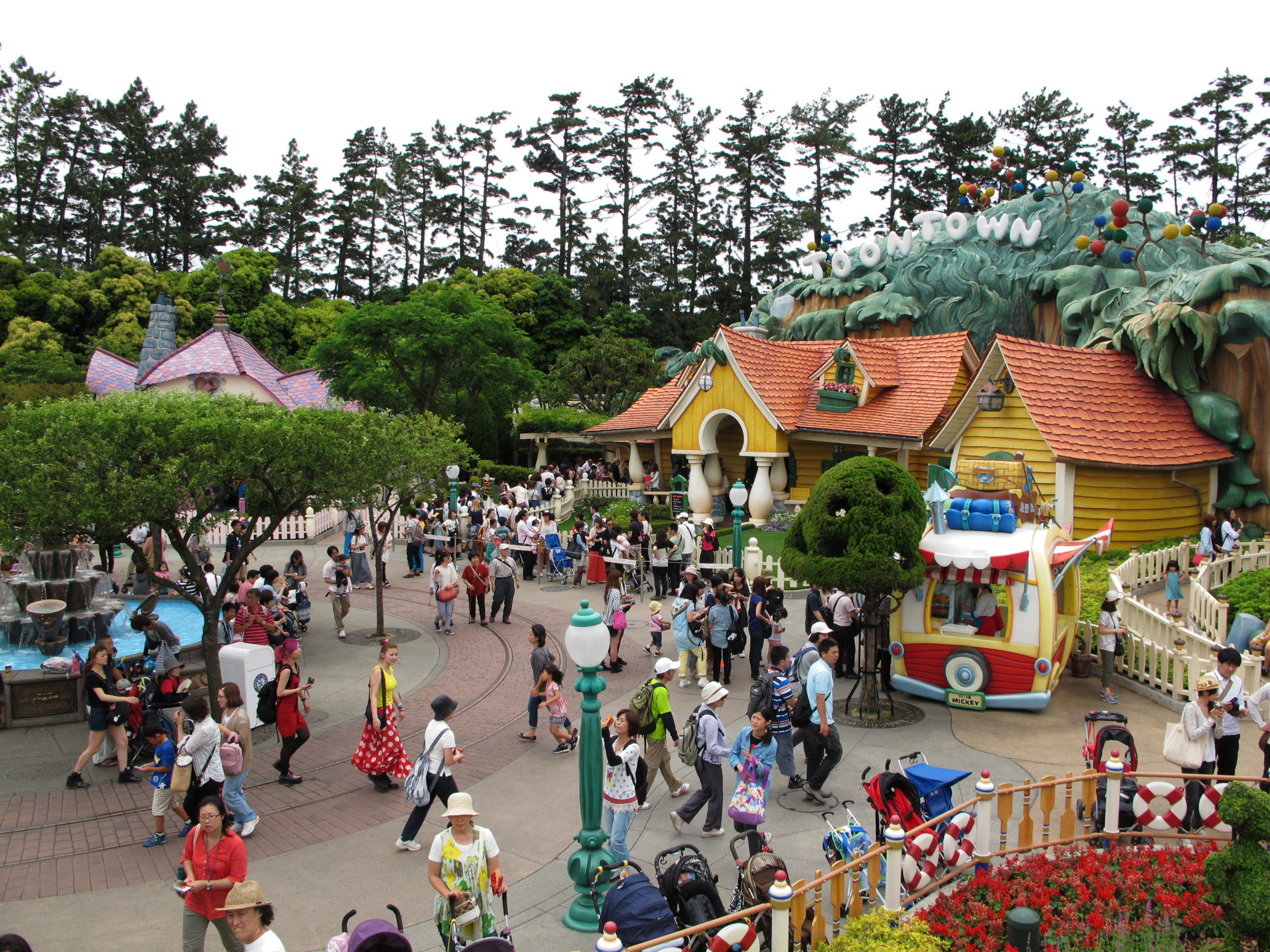
Mickey and Minnie's houses

Toontown (Japanese language: トゥーンタウン) opened in Tokyo Disneyland on April 15, 1996. It is largely a copy of the original Mickey's Toontown at Disneyland, with a mirror image of its layout.

In mid May 2017, the entrance to Toontown was removed, to be replaced with Minnie's Style Studio.

=== Attractions and entertainment ===
- Chip 'n Dale's Treehouse
- Donald's Boat
- Gadget's Go Coaster
- Goofy's Paint 'n' Playhouse
- Mickey's House and Meet Mickey
- Minnie's House
- Minnie's Style Studio
- Roger Rabbit's Car Toon Spin
- Toon Park

=== Former attractions and entertainment ===
- Goofy's Bounce House (re-themed to Goofy's Paint 'n' Playhouse)
- Jolly Trolley (3 ft (914 mm) narrow gauge) (1996–2009)

=== Restaurants and refreshments ===
- Dinghy Drinks
- Toon Pop
- Huey, Dewey, & Louie's Good Time Cafe
- Mickey's Trailer
- Pop-A-Lot Popcorn

=== Shops ===
- Toontown Delivery Company
- Gag Factory
- Toontown Five & Dime

== In popular culture ==
- Mickey's Toontown inspired an online role-playing game called Toontown Online, which was released in 2003. The online game is similar to Mickey's Toontown. On September 19, 2013, the game was shut down.
- In the video game Epic Mickey, OsTown was inspired by Mickey's Toontown. However, OsTown features more "dog-faces", an Oswald the Lucky Rabbit fountain, and Clarabelle Cow. The Gag Factory also appears in Epic Mickey and its sequel Epic Mickey 2: The Power of Two.
- In the video game Kingdom Hearts Birth by Sleep, the world Disney Town was inspired by Mickey's Toontown.
- In July 2011, for the television program Curb Appeal: The Block, designer and host John Gidding installed a comical Toontown-style railing, made of styrofoam, on the front porch of an Alameda, California home. It was eventually removed.
