= Roger Rabbit's Car Toon Spin =

Disney parks dark ride

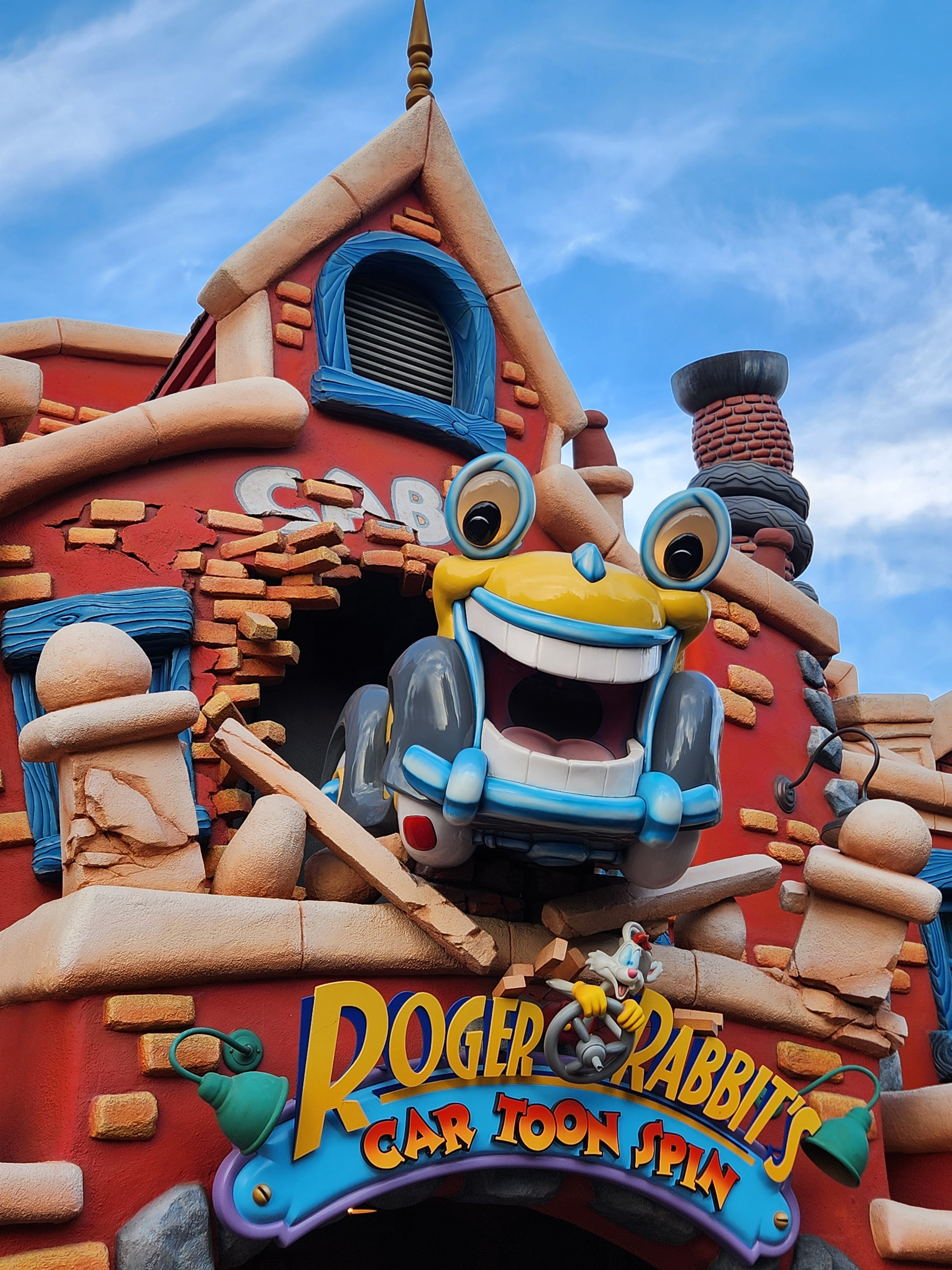
- Attraction entrance at Disneyland in California

Disneyland
- Area: Mickey's Toontown
- Coordinates: 33.815227°N 117.918055°W
- Status: Operating
- Opening date: January 26, 1994
- Lightning Lane available

Tokyo Disneyland
- Area: Toontown
- Status: Operating
- Opening date: April 15, 1996

Ride statistics
- Attraction type: Dark ride
- Designer: Walt Disney Imagineering
- Theme: Who Framed Roger Rabbit
- Music: George Wilkins (based on Franz Liszt's Hungarian Rhapsody No. 2)
- Vehicle type: Spinning Toon Taxi Cab
- Riders per vehicle: 4-6
- Duration: 3:30 minutes
- Audio-animatronics: Yes
- Must transfer from wheelchair

Roger Rabbit's Car Toon Spin is a dark ride located at the Disneyland and Tokyo Disneyland theme parks, based on the 1988 Touchstone/Amblin film Who Framed Roger Rabbit. Both versions of the attraction are located in Mickey's Toontown. The Disneyland version opened on January 26, 1994, a year after the Mickey's Toontown area opened, and the Tokyo Disneyland version opened on April 15, 1996. In December 2021, the Disneyland version was updated to include a new plot element of Jessica Rabbit in the role of a detective who is determined to stop a crime wave in Toontown.

== History ==
Roger Rabbit was recognized as a lucrative character by Disney after the release of Who Framed Roger Rabbit and a set of attractions based on the movie were developed for many Disney theme parks. Roger was set to be the star of his own land, behind Main Street, U.S.A. at Disneyland, called Hollywoodland. Meanwhile at Magic Kingdom, a new land behind Fantasyland was being developed in honor of Mickey Mouse's sixtieth birthday, named Mickey's Birthdayland.

There were also set to be attractions based on Roger Rabbit, Judge Doom and Baby Herman opening in a major expansion at Disney's Hollywood Studios and Tokyo Disneyland, known as "Roger Rabbit's Hollywood". These attractions included Toontown Trolley, a simulator ride through Toontown aboard a new character named Gus the Bus; Toon Coaster, a roller coaster based on the short Roller Coaster Rabbit; Baby Herman's Runaway Baby Buggy Ride, a ride based on the short Tummy Trouble; and a Benny the Cab ride, which evolved into Roger Rabbit's Car Toon Spin. However, due to Disney and Amblin's (Steven Spielberg's company that co-financed the film) argument over the rights to the character and the financial troubles of the Euro Disney Resort, plans were cut back with only Disneyland and Tokyo Disneyland receiving any Roger Rabbit-themed attractions.

Imagineer Joe Lanzisero described the creation of the ride:

This ride grew out of, really, Disney technology. Even though we wanted to do something new and cutting edge, we didn't want to reinvent the wheel. So this is really a hybrid of existing technologies in the park. We physically went to one of our existing dark rides which is a ride vehicle that runs along on a bus bar and we looked at the teacups which are on a little post that spins around. We took a teacup one night off the teacup ride, put it on Pinocchio and went through the ride to see how these two technologies would work together, and it was a marriage made in heaven. Actually, made in Disneyland.

According to former Imagineer Jim Shull, The Little Mermaid (1989) was a candidate under consideration to receive a new attraction in Mickey's Toontown while it was initially being developed. Imagineers changed course to a ride based on Winnie the Pooh for Mickey's Toontown and got a decent way through its development. The ride would have had guests in spinning honey pots, but then-CEO Michael Eisner came in and asked Imagineers to switch gears and make an attraction inspired by Who Framed Roger Rabbit.

In September 2021, it was announced that Walt Disney Imagineering would update the ride in Disneyland to include a new plot element of Jessica Rabbit in the role of a detective who is determined to stop a crime wave in Toontown. The update debuted in December 2021.

After a refurbishment in 2026, the ride at Disneyland was updated so that the vehicles spin automatically, with riders no longer in control of the spinning. A Disneyland official stated that the change means that they can "offer lap sitting for younger guests" and that the update is part of an effort to "mitigate downtime on the attraction".

== Queue and ride ==
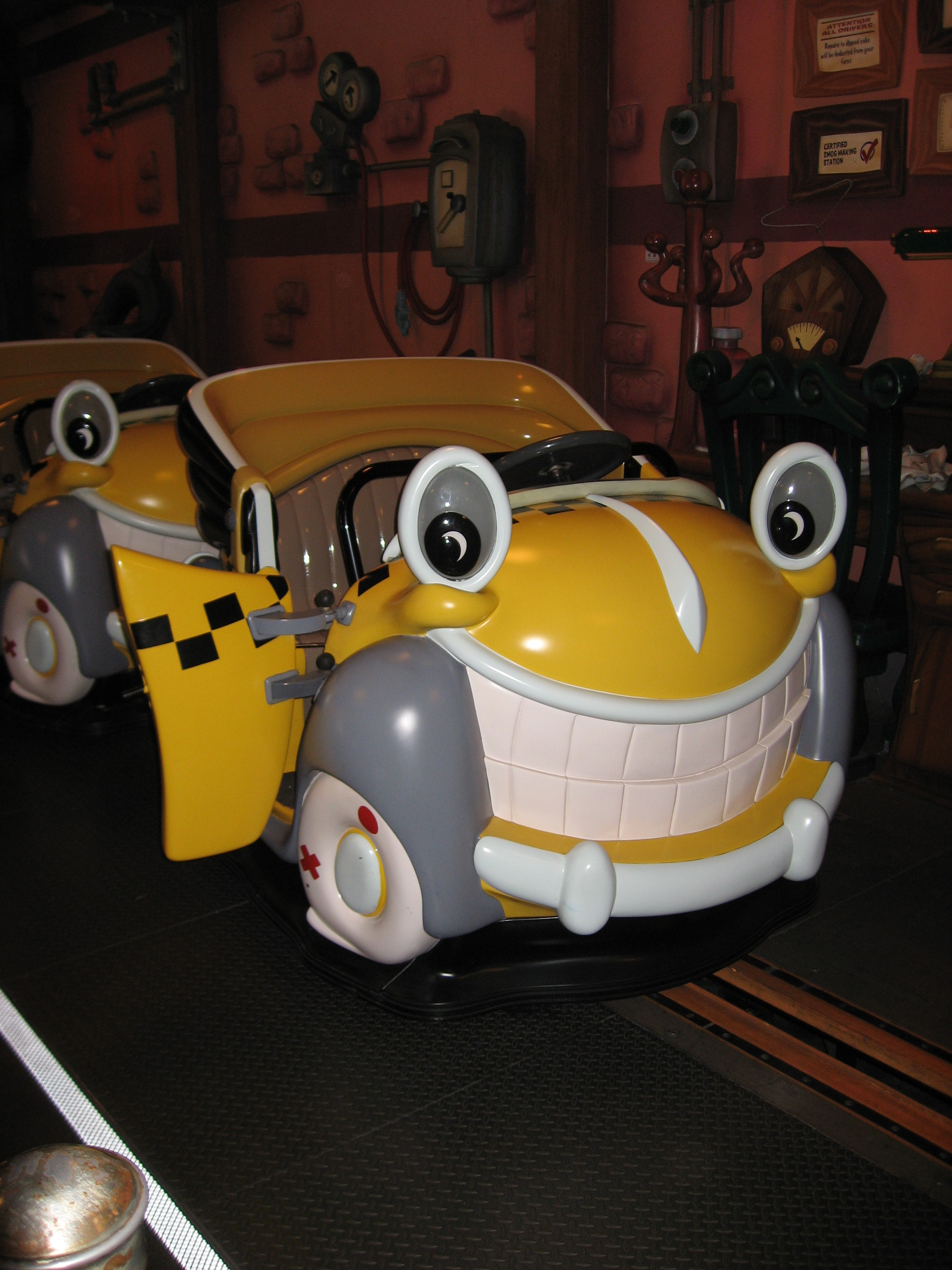
The loading area in Disneyland, California.

At the start of the ride's queue entering the Toontown Cab Company, some license plates hanging on the wall have code-like puns of various Disney characters or slogans. They include 2N TOWN (Toontown), BB WOLF (Big Bad Wolf), MR TOAD (Mr. Toad), 1DRLND (Wonderland), 1D N PTR (Wendy & Peter), IM L8 ("I'm late" - The White Rabbit), CAP 10 HK (Captain Hook), L MERM8 (Little Mermaid), 101 DLMN (101 Dalmatians), FAN T C (Fantasy), RS2CAT (Aristocat), ZPD2DA (Zip-a-Dee-Doo-Dah), and 3 LIL PIGS (Three Little Pigs).

The queue winds its way through darkened Toontown streets and alleys, passing through the Ink and Paint Club's backstage areas including Jessica Rabbit's dressing room and the prop cage. (In the U.S. version, guests then pass by a newspaper article stating that Jessica Rabbit, inspired by her friend Eddie Valiant, has become a Toontown private eye who is determined to stop the weasels' recent crime wave.) Guests then past the window of Baby Herman's apartment. In a window on an upper floor, the silhouettes of the Toon Patrol can be seen, as guests pass through the weasels' hideout and Dip refinery. Exiting this area, the guests return to the Toontown Cab Company and approach the loading area. Characters' voices can also be heard throughout the queue, including two points where the weasels can be heard discussing their plans, one in the alley in front of the Ink and Paint Club and the other in their hideout. Jessica can also be heard talking on the phone to Roger and to her stage manager in her dressing room.

Guests board a yellow Toon cab named Lenny the Cab, the twin cousin of Benny the Cab. Each cab seats two people, and the cabs are dispatched in groups of two. Once the traffic light in the loading area changes to green, the cabs leave the loading area. The ride begins with Stupid, Greasy and Wheezy dumping barrels of Dip onto the streets, sending Roger Rabbit and Benny spinning out of control, and the guests' cab drives into the Dip as well. At this point, the cab can then spin around, much like Mad Tea Party in Fantasyland. Nearby, Smart Guy has tied up Jessica and placed her in the trunk of his car. (in U.S. version, there are barrels of Dip in the trunk of Smart Guy's car that he is dumping onto the street. Jessica is dressed in a detective's trench coat and fedora, standing behind Smart Guy with her arm held forward, directing the weasels to stop dumping Dip).

The cabs then crash through the Bullina China Shoppe run by a bull, who is trying to protect some of his stock. Upon exiting the shop, the cars travel down Spin Street, where Toon fire hydrants, telephone poles, mailboxes, and streetlights laugh and dance around.

Next, the cabs enter the Toontown Power House, where they pass a furnace with an abstract face and encounter Roger having an electricity fight with Psycho. Passing through a series of explosions, the cabs "fall down" from Toon skyscrapers. As the cabs head closer to street level past a group of stairs, Roger promises to fix things.

The cabs then enter the Gag Factory, going past various jokes and gags, and a weasel holds a large crate lid open for the cabs. Jessica manages to free herself and assaults Greasy and Wheezy with a mallet. (In the U.S. version, Jessica assaults Greasy and Wheezy using a mallet from her "anti-weasel equipment" bag). Stupid then tries to drop a safe onto the cabs. Just as the Dip Machine (operated by Smart Guy) is about to Dip the cabs, they narrowly escape and Roger saves the guests by stretching his arm out and using a portable hole to allow the cabs to return safely to the Toontown Cab Company, going through a cartoon "The End" title card to return to the loading area.

== Voice cast ==
- Jess Harnell as Roger Rabbit
- Marnie Mosiman as Jessica Rabbit
- Jim Cummings as Baby Herman
- Charles Fleischer as Benny the Cab, Greasy and Psycho
- David Lander as Smart Guy
- June Foray as Wheezy
- Fred Newman as Stupid
- Will Ryan as weasel
- Marcelo Vignali as Bongo the Gorilla, Bull and Jack-in-the-Box Clown 1
- Joe Lanzisero as Jack-in-the-Box Clown 2
- Tony Anselmo as Donald Duck (preshow)
- Brad Abrell as Lenny, and Safety Spiel Announcer

== Ride design ==
The ride was designed between 1991 and 1992 by Imagineers Joe Lanzisero, Marcelo Vignali, Art Verity and Andrea Favilli; Lanzisero did a rough storyboard, Vignali was the lead designer, came up with the chase storyline and did concept art, Verity wrote the dialogue and humor, and Favilli did the art and exterior designs. Earlier plans for the attraction called for it to take place on multiple levels, with a brief outdoor section. However, it was soon discovered that the ride vehicles could not climb the ramps necessary to make it to a second floor, so the idea was dropped. Despite this, the exterior balcony for this outdoor track still exists in Mickey's Toontown. The ride's queue line was originally planned to have an outdoor section with Mickey Mouse, Donald Duck, Goofy, Roger Rabbit and Benny the Cab's handprints and footprints in a slab of wet cement. The ride features 17 Audio-Animatronics figures, 59 animated props and 20 special effects.

Vignali recorded his voice for Bongo the Gorilla in the queue area and the bull in the Bullina China Shoppe. He also drew caricatures of both Lanzisero and himself as the jack-in-the-box clowns in the Gag Warehouse, and they recorded the laughter for the clowns. The goal was to end the ride with guests going through a cartoon portable hole to escape, so Vignali did a drawing of Roger Rabbit as the guests exited the ride. The Imagineering R&D department gave Vignali and Lanzisero two solutions; one solution was a wall behind a wall, and the illusion was an optical one. The bricks behind the first wall would be painted larger, so as the guests approached they would appear to be on the same plane. The second solution was to have a wall with a hole cut into it, and a thin sheet of fog would be blasted in front to create a surface, followed by a projection of a portable hole appearing as the guests exit the ride. Neither of those effects worked, so Favilli reached out to magician Jim Steinmeyer. Steinmeyer helped the Imagineers create the portable hole effect with a simple magic trick, involving a sliding tunnel with mirrors on its sides, which was built in the ride. Vignali also designed this particular scene so that the animatronic figure of Roger was not entirely audio-animatronic, but rather "show-action animation". This meant that the extending arm would be placing the portable hole against the wall, not the Roger figure. This illusion was a solution that helped to stretch the ride's budget, and meant that both the ride and the illusion could continue to work even if the equipment was not working, with the posing of the character also working with or without animation.

== Incident ==
On September 22, 2000, four-year-old Brandon Zucker fell out of the Disneyland version of the ride and suffered serious injuries. The victim's family sued and eventually settled out of court. On January 26, 2009, Zucker died at the age of 13 due to complications from his injuries.

== See also ==
- List of Disneyland attractions
