= Space Mountain (Tokyo Disneyland) =

Roller coaster

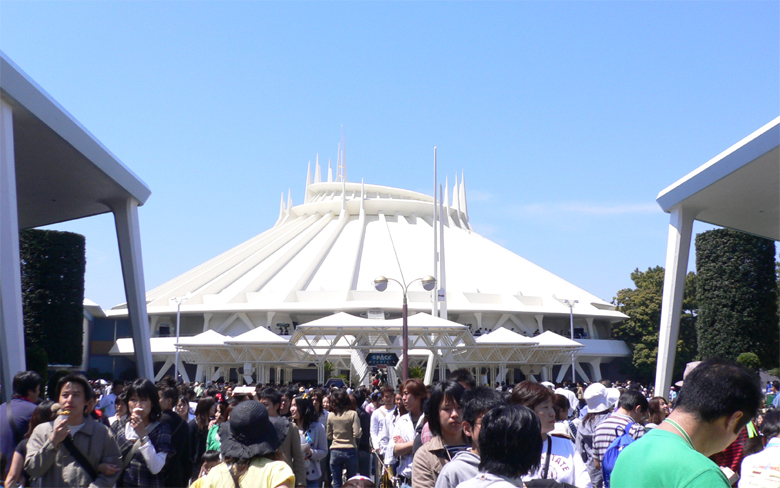

Tokyo Disneyland
- Park section: Tomorrowland
- Coordinates: 35°37′56″N 139°52′40″E
- Status: Closed
- Opening date: April 15, 1983 (Original version); April 28, 2007 (Second version); 2027 (Third version as Space Mountain: Earthrise)
- Closing date: October 30, 2006 (Original version); July 31, 2024 (Second version)

General statistics
- Type: Steel
- Designer: WED Enterprises
- Height: 76 ft (23.2 m)
- Drop: 17 ft (5.2 m)
- Length: 3,450 ft (1,051.6 m)
- Speed: 30 mph (48.3 km/h)
- Inversions: 0
- Duration: 2:45
- Height restriction: 40 in (102 cm)
- Trains: 14 trains with 2 cars. Riders are arranged 2 across in 3 rows for a total of 12 riders per train.
- Sponsor: Coca-Cola Japan Co., Ltd.
- Wheelchair accessible
- Must transfer from wheelchair
- Space Mountain at RCDB; Pictures of Space Mountain at RCDB

Space Mountain is a roller coaster at Tokyo Disneyland, and one of several Space Mountain coasters at Disney parks. It opened on April 15, 1983, making it the first time Space Mountain has opened concurrently with a park. Along with Space Mountain at Walt Disney World, it does not feature an on-board soundtrack.

In 2022, The Oriental Land Company announced that the second version of Space Mountain would close on July 31, 2024 and reopen in 2027 with an all-new exterior and surrounding area as Tomorrowland Plaza, as being the third renovation, and under the name of Space Mountain: Earthrise.

== Versions ==
=== Original version (1983–2006) ===
Tokyo Disneyland’s Space Mountain was originally built as a replica of the California version from 1977, excluding the Space Stage and PeopleMover. Though removed in California, Tokyo’s Space Mountain still has a speed ramp at its entrance, leading guests to the pre-show and loading area.

Along the queue are doors marked “escape pod” where guests can exit the line if they choose not to ride Space Mountain, similar to pathway exits at other attractions guests may find scary.

=== Second version (2007–2024) ===
In 2007, a refurbished Space Mountain opened as the second renovation with new sci-fi elements, like the spaceship docked in the loading area. New effects were built on top of the original effects, including a hyper speed tunnel at the end of the attraction, when guests return to the loading area.

In 2022, it was announced that the 2007 version of the attraction would close on July 31, 2024 to be reimagined as a part of a wider overhaul of the park's Tomorrowland area.

The original plan was to demolish the original Space Mountain and build a new Space Mountain on its site. However, in order to reduce the closure period, the new Space Mountain was to be built 80 meters away from the old Space Mountain, allowing it to operate for an additional two years from the start of construction of the new attraction in 2022 until the old Space Mountain closes in July 2024. A new Tomorrowland Plaza will be built on the site of original Space Mountain.

=== Third version (2027) ===
On August 13, 2026, The Oriental Land Company announced the name of the new attraction as Space Mountain Earthrise, which will open in 2027. The press release also confirmed it retains the same concept as an indoor coaster, but with "various enhancements, a new story and rich and dynamic show elements." Space Mountain Earthrise will be the first coaster at Tokyo Disney Resort with an onboard audio system.

== Statistics ==
- Grand Opening: April 15, 1983 (Opened with Tokyo Disneyland)
- Re-Launching Date: April 28, 2007
- Designers: Walt Disney Imagineering
- Vehicles: 14 Rockets
  - Vehicle Theme: Rocket
- Building Diameter: 200 feet (61 m)
- Largest Drop: 17 feet (5.15 m)
- Building Height: 118 feet (35 m)
- Track Length: 3,450 feet (1052 m)
- Volume: 1.8 million cubic feet (51,000 m³)
- Top Speed: 30 miles per hour (48 km/h)
- Height Requirement: 40 inches (1.02 m)
- Ride Duration: 2:45
- Ticket Required: "E"
- Ride System: Roller coaster
- Sponsor: Coca-Cola, Ltd. of Japan
