= Tokyo Disneyland =

Theme park in Chiba, Japan

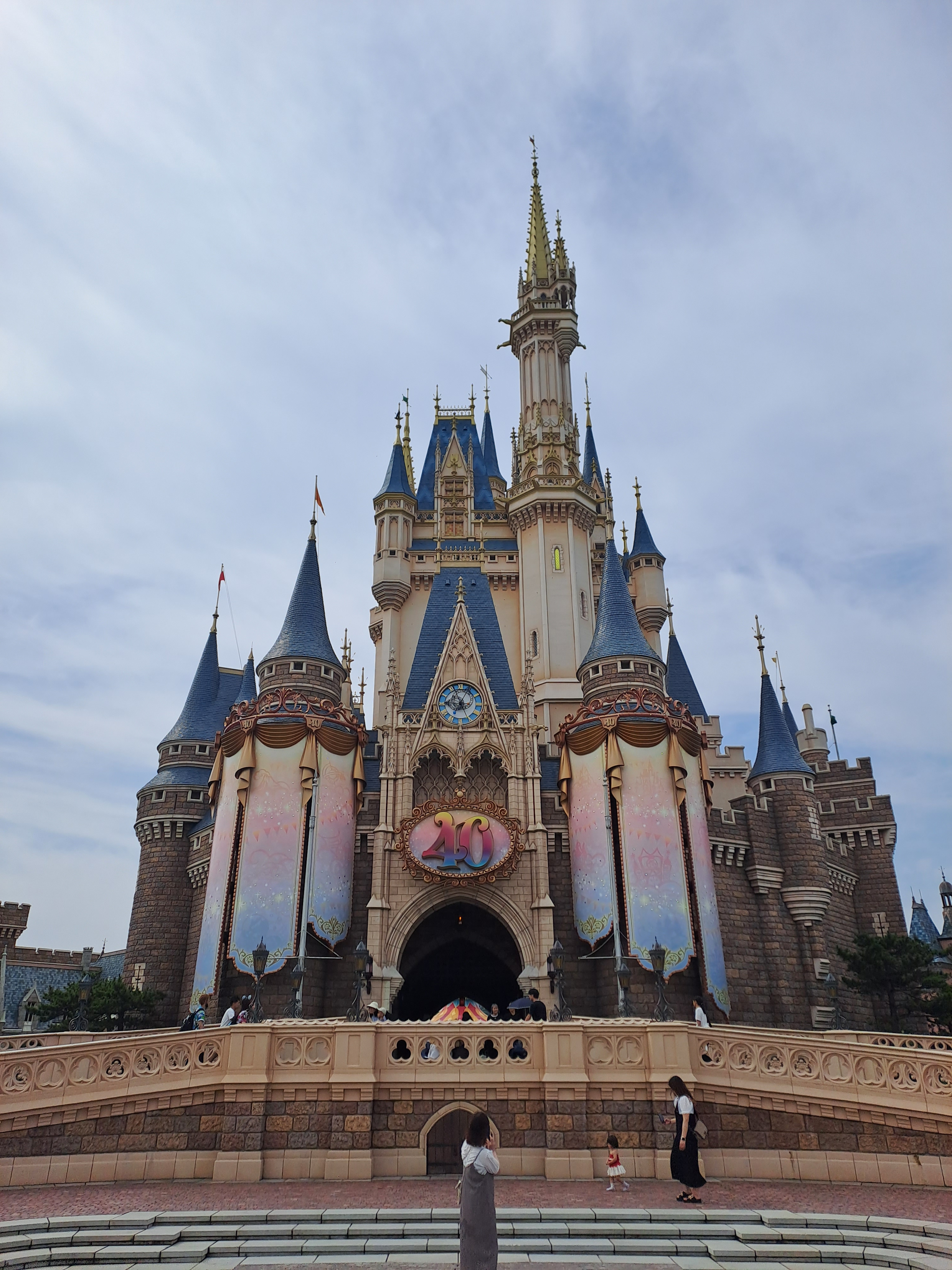
- Cinderella Castle, the icon of Tokyo Disneyland, in 2023.
- Interactive map of Tokyo Disneyland
- Location: Tokyo Disney Resort, Urayasu, Chiba Prefecture, Japan
- Coordinates: 35°37′58″N 139°52′50″E
- Status: Operating
- Opened: April 15, 1983; 43 years ago
- Operated by: The Oriental Land Company
- Theme: The Kingdom of Dreams and Magic
- Area: 126 acres (51 ha)
- Website: Tokyo Disneyland official website (English)

Tokyo Disneyland (Japanese: 東京ディズニーランド, Hepburn: Tōkyō Dizunīrando; local nickname TDL) is a 126-acre (51 ha) theme park at the Tokyo Disney Resort in Urayasu, near Tokyo in Chiba Prefecture, Japan Its main gate is directly adjacent to both Maihama Station and Tokyo Disneyland Station. It was the first Disney park to be built outside the United States and it opened on April 15, 1983. The park was constructed by WED Enterprises in the same style as Disneyland in California and Magic Kingdom in Florida. It is owned by the Oriental Land Company, which licenses intellectual property from the Walt Disney Company. Tokyo Disneyland and its companion park, Tokyo DisneySea, are the only Disney parks in the world not owned or operated by the Walt Disney Company in any capacity.

The park has seven themed areas: the World Bazaar, Adventureland, Westernland, Fantasyland, Tomorrowland, Critter Country and Toontown. Many of these areas mirror those in the original Disneyland as they are based on American Disney films and fantasies. Fantasyland includes Peter Pan's Flight, Snow White's Scary Adventures, and Dumbo the Flying Elephant, based on Disney films and characters. The park is noted for its extensive open spaces to accommodate the large crowds that visit the park. In 2024, Tokyo Disneyland hosted 15.1 million visitors, making it the fourth-most visited theme park in the world and the second-most visited theme park in Asia.

== History ==
Logo used from 1977 to 1999.

The site for Tokyo Disneyland was part of a 600-acre landfill designated in the 1960s as a recreational area to address the growing demand for entertainment in the Tokyo metropolitan area. This decision set the stage for the eventual establishment of the Tokyo Disney Resort.

The idea of a Japanese Disneyland dates back to the late 1950s when Japanese businessman Kunizo Matsuo approached Walt Disney with the idea of a Disney park in Nara. While it is rumored Walt initially agreed to the idea, he later dropped out of it. Matsuo, still determined to open his Disney-themed park, opened Nara Dreamland in 1961, a near replica of Disneyland except without Disney's characters or intellectual property. This park would continue to operate until 2006, and was eventually demolished in 2017.

In February 1974, the Oriental Land Company (OLC) formally invited Disney executives to Japan for a fact-finding tour. In June of the same year, the company's president, Chiharu Kawasaki, visited Disney's headquarters to reinforce the OLC's desire to bring Disneyland to Japan. Kawasaki once again extended an invitation to the top Disney executives to visit Japan; the offer was taken up in December.

After many years of negotiations Masatomo Takahashi, president of the OLC, signed the initial contract for the construction of Tokyo Disneyland in Chiba Prefecture in April 1979. Japanese engineers and architects visited California to tour Disneyland and prepare to construct the new park. The construction of the park began a year later and was covered by hundreds of reporters as an indication of the high expectations for the park in the future. The final cost of Tokyo Disneyland was 180 billion yen rather than the projected 100 billion yen.

On February 28, 2020, the OLC announced a temporary closure of Tokyo Disneyland and DisneySea from February 29 to combat the COVID-19 pandemic. The closure, originally slated to expire in mid-March, was later extended twice, with the latest extension being until July 1, 2020.

== Park layout and attractions ==
With a few exceptions, Tokyo Disneyland features the same attractions found in Disneyland and Walt Disney World's Magic Kingdom.

Areas of Tokyo Disneyland

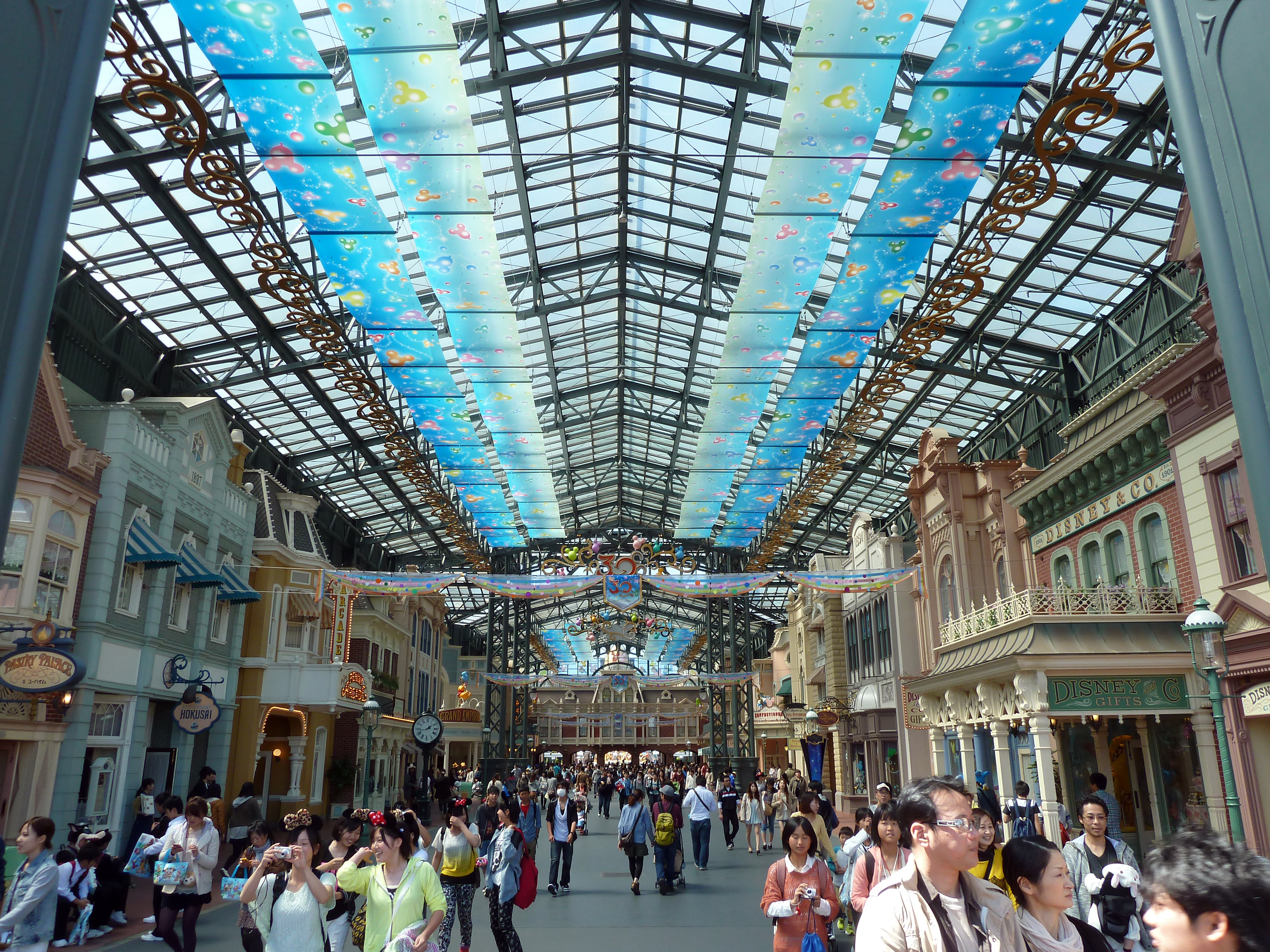
World Bazaar

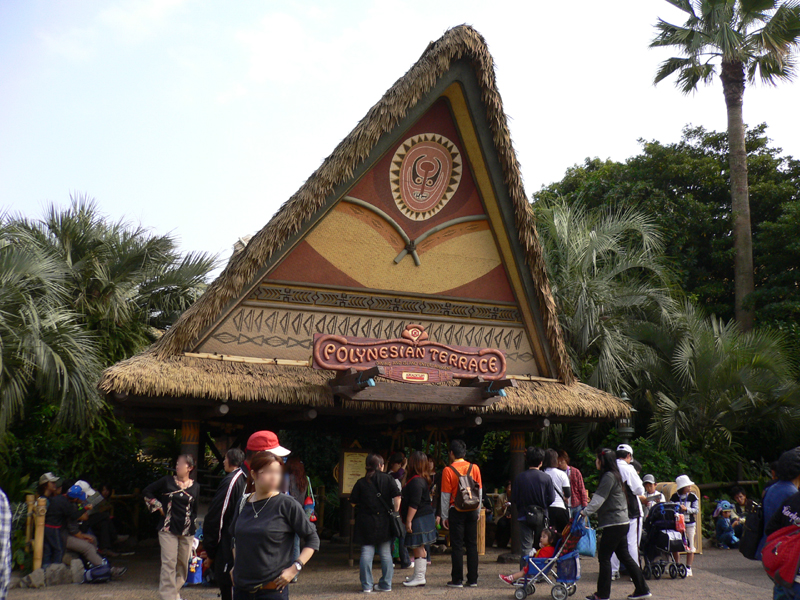
Adventureland
(exterior of Polynesian Terrace Restaurant)

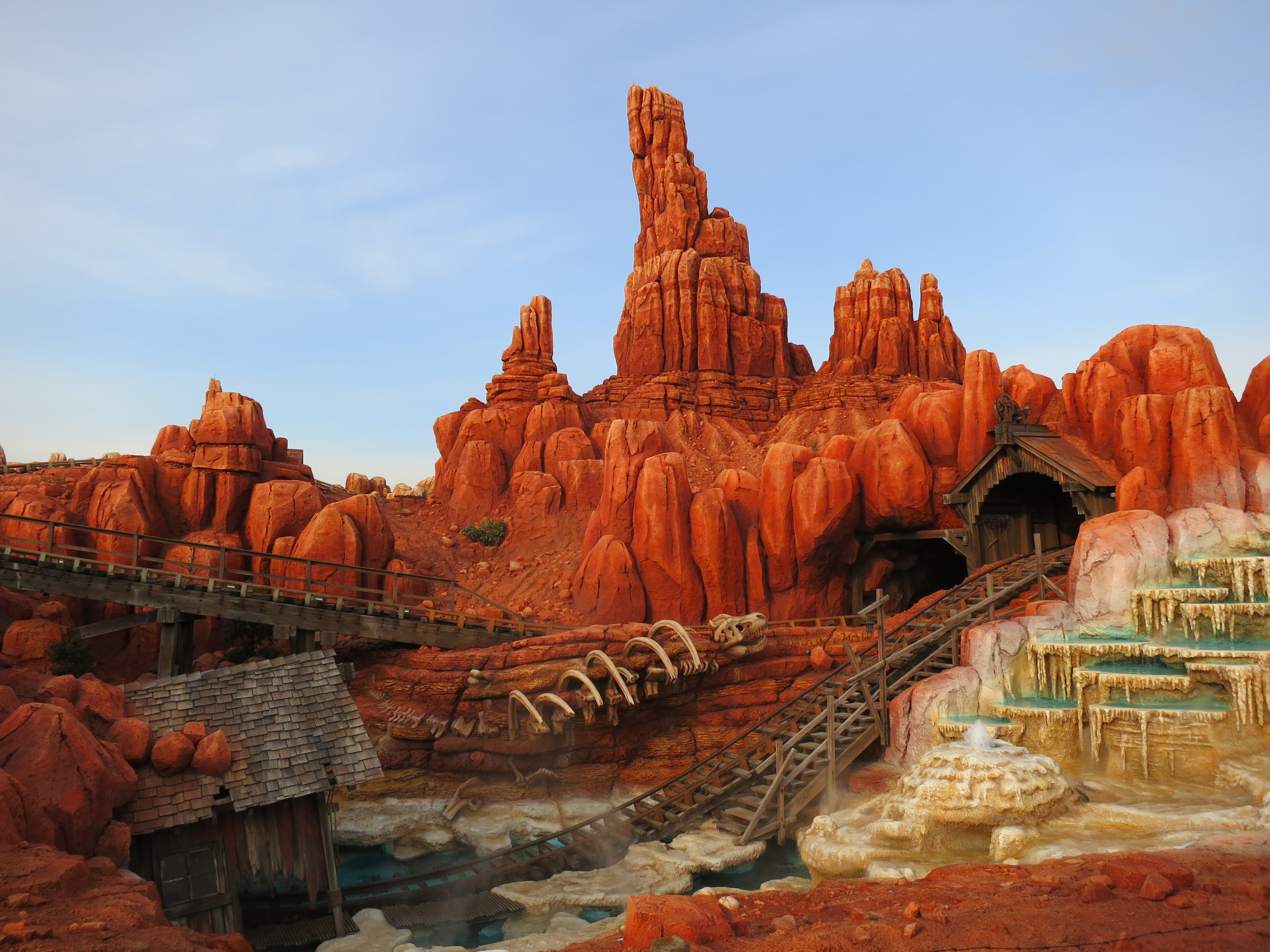
Westernland
(Big Thunder Mountain)

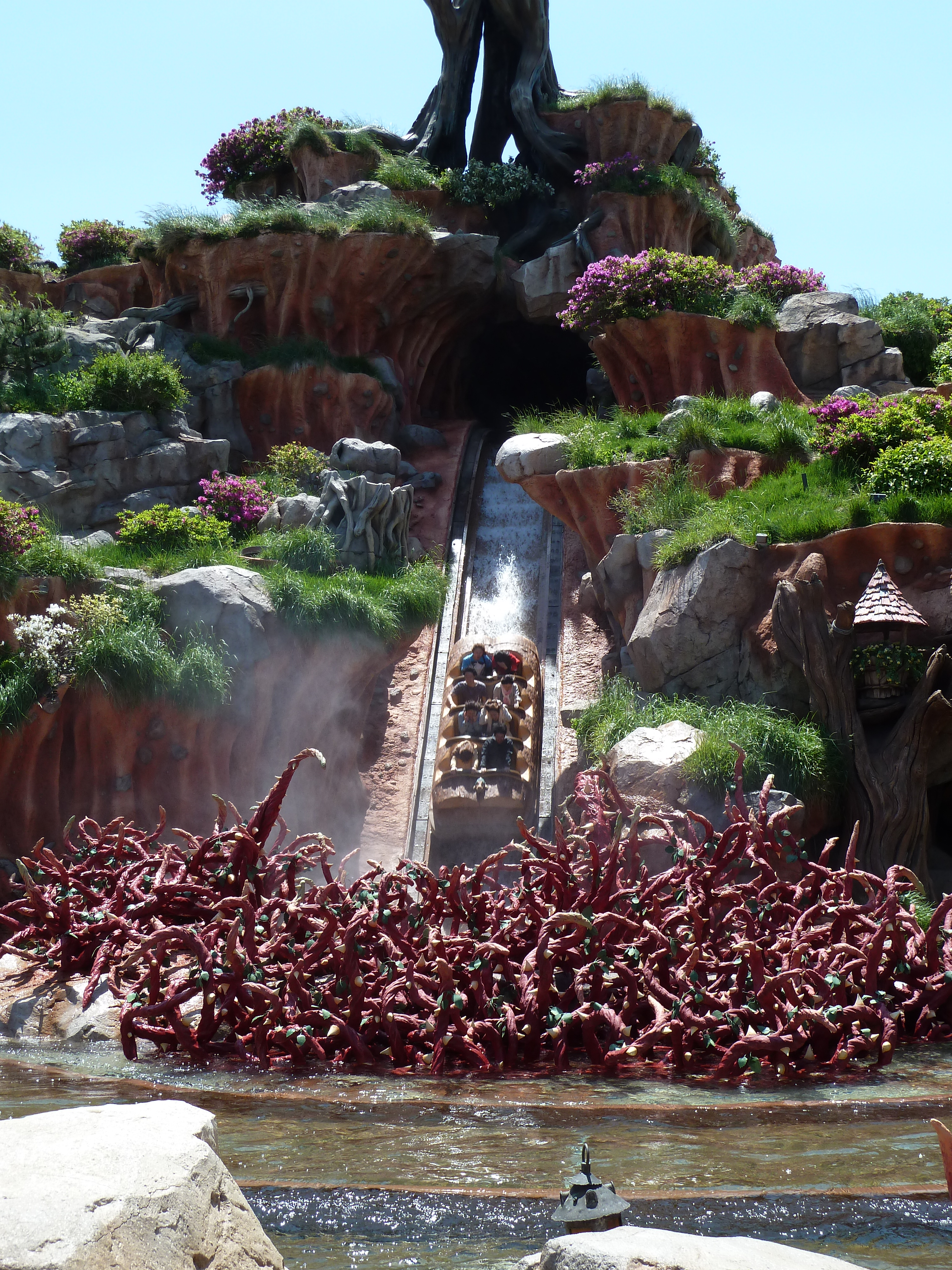
Critter Country
(Splash Mountain)

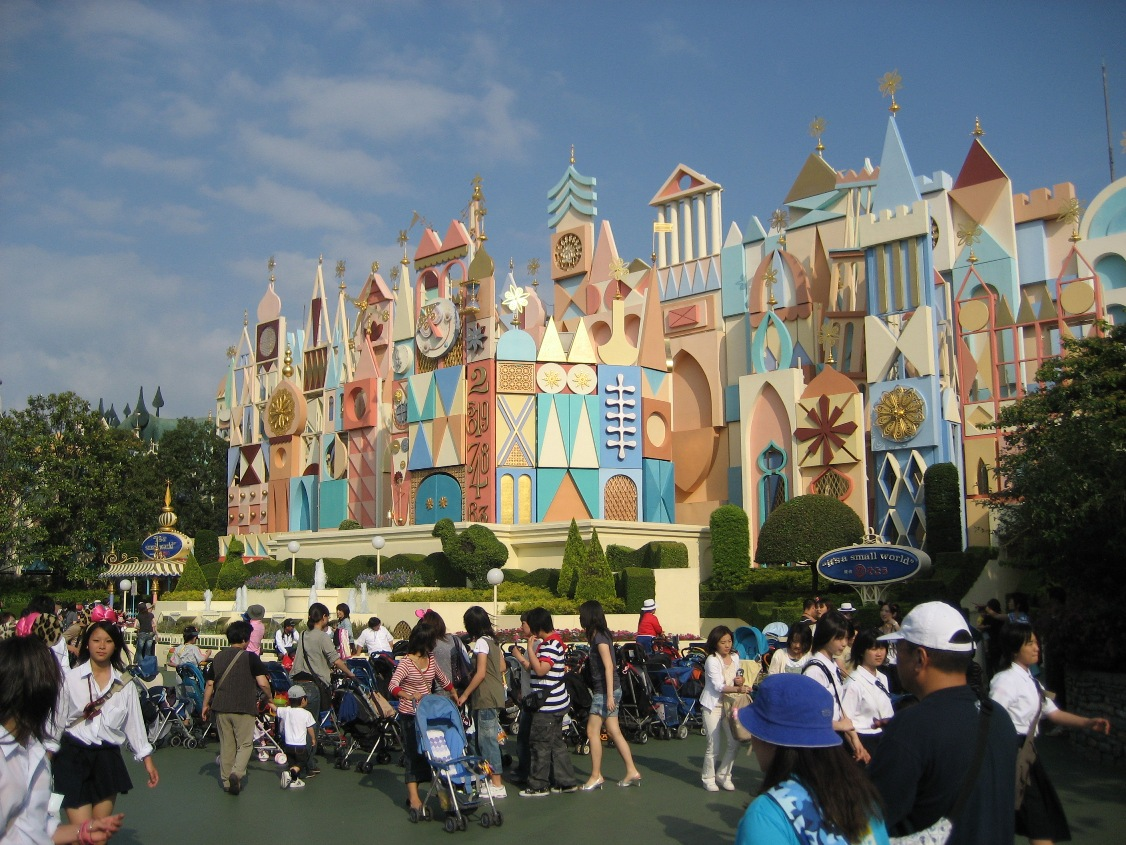
Fantasyland
(It's a Small World)

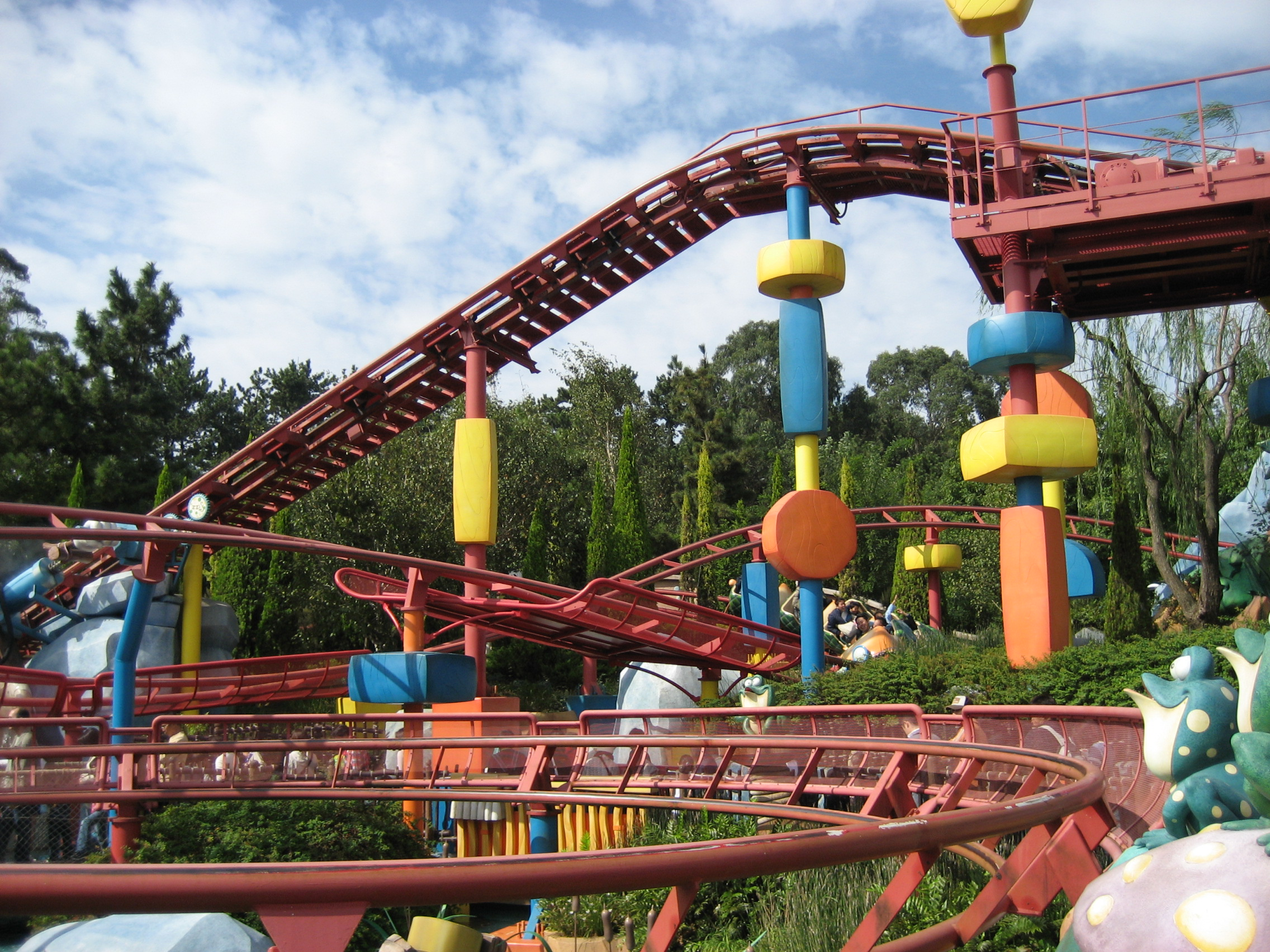
Toontown
(Gadget's Go Coaster)

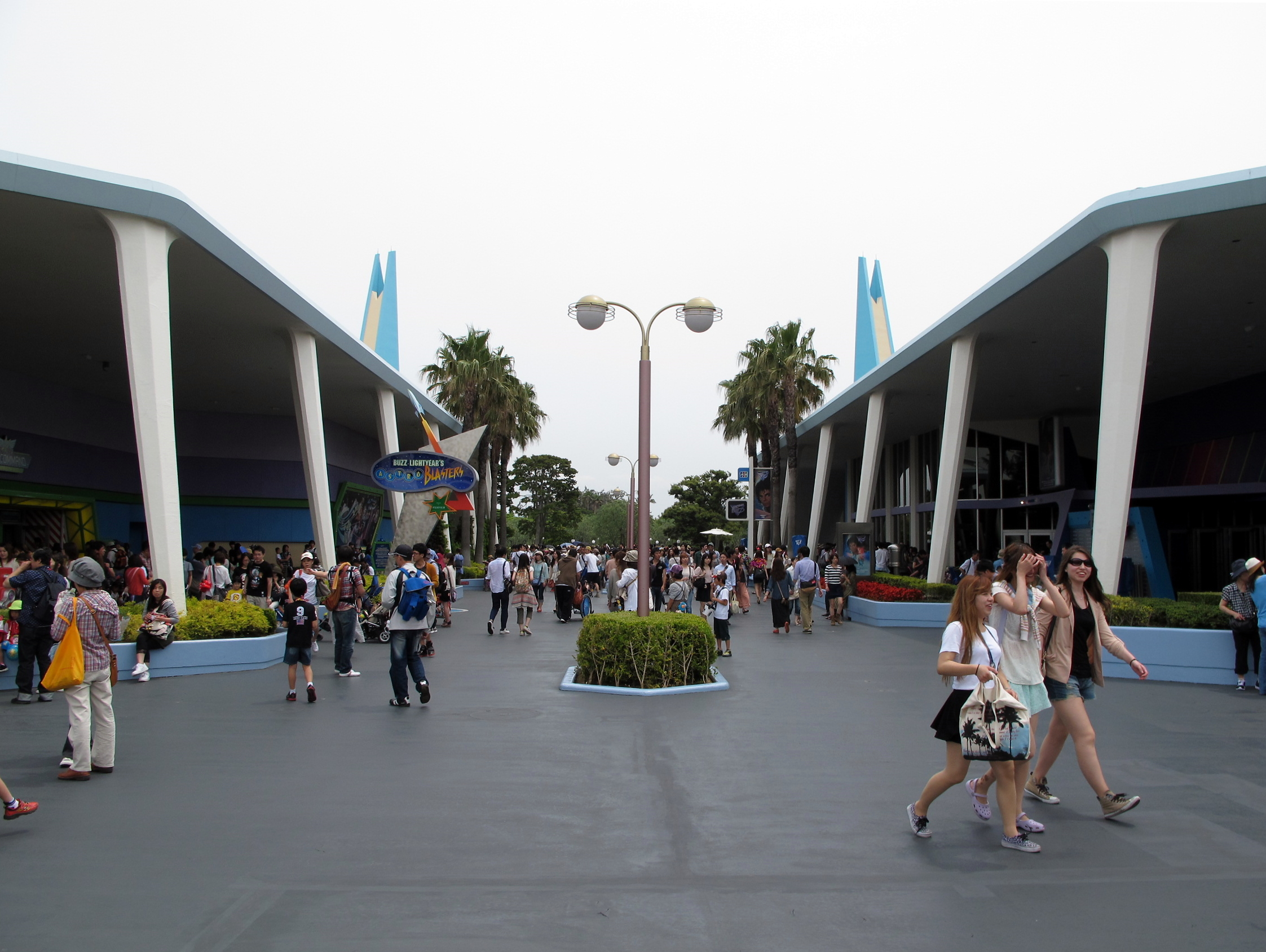
Tomorrowland

=== World Bazaar ===
World Bazaar is the main entry corridor and primary shopping area of Tokyo Disneyland. Despite the use of the word "World" in its name, the general look and theme of World Bazaar is that of early 20th-century America, matching the "Main Street, U.S.A." areas of other Magic Kingdom-style parks. World Bazaar consists of two intersecting "streets": Main Street (the primary corridor running from the main entrance toward Cinderella Castle), and Center Street, which forms a perpendicular line with Main Street and leads to Adventureland in one direction and Tomorrowland in the other. World Bazaar has a permanent canopy covering the Main Street and Center Street areas, designed to protect guests from the elements.

=== Adventureland ===
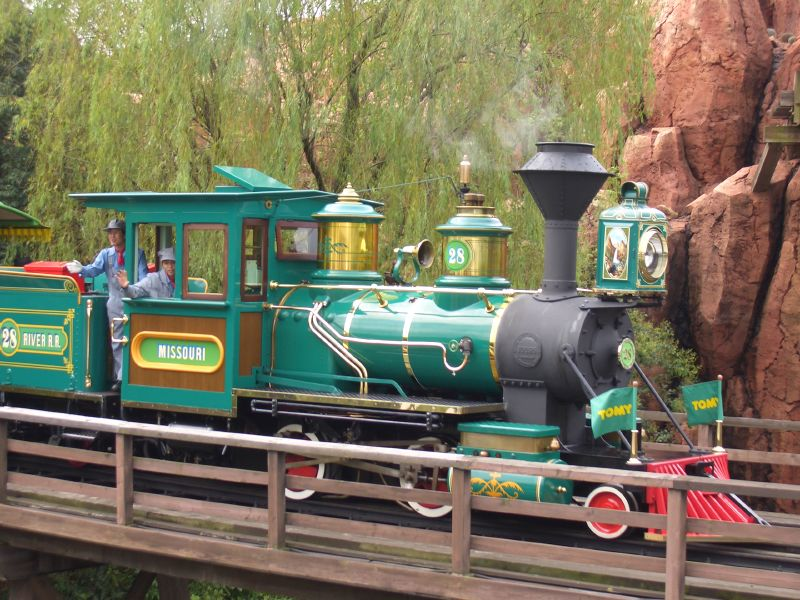
The Western River Railroad

Adventureland consists of two distinct yet complementary areas: A New Orleans-themed area and a "jungle"-themed area. It borrows stylistic and architectural features from the New Orleans Square and Adventureland areas found in Disneyland Park in the United States.

=== Westernland ===
Westernland is an "old west" themed area, the counterpart of Frontierland in other Magic Kingdom-style parks. The landscape of Westernland is dominated by Big Thunder Mountain, a Monument Valley-style mountain surrounding a mine train roller coaster, and the Rivers of America, a man-made waterway that is home to the Mark Twain Riverboat, Tom Sawyer Island, and numerous live and Audio-Animatronic animals.

=== Critter Country ===
Critter Country is a small area of the park with the main attraction being Splash Mountain, a log flume ride which opened in 1992 and is based on the animated sequences of Disney's 1946 film Song of the South.

=== Fantasyland ===
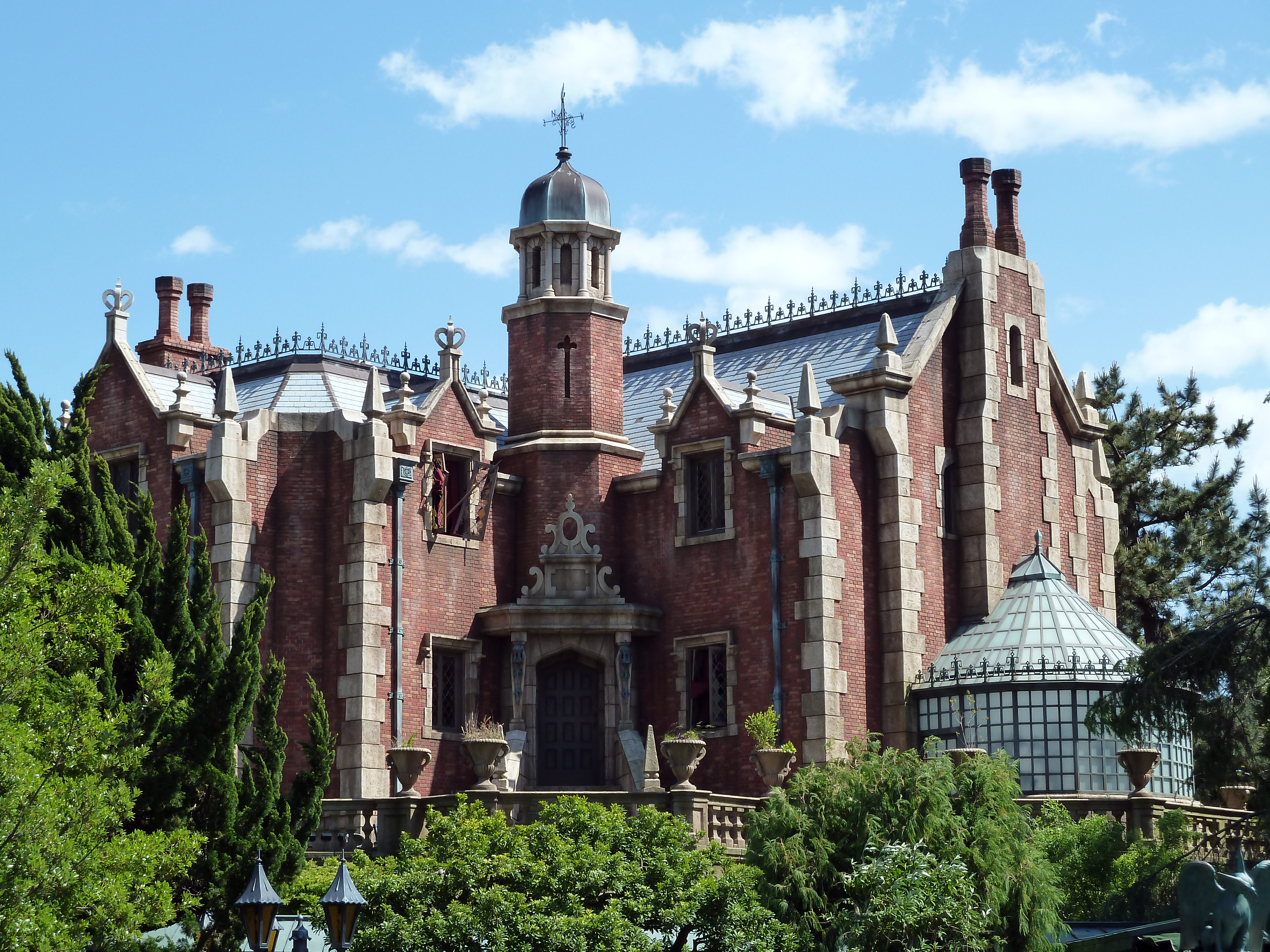
In Tokyo Disneyland The Haunted Mansion is located in Fantasyland.

Like other Magic Kingdom theme parks, Fantasyland's central entryway is a castle, in this case Cinderella Castle, a near exact copy of the one in Florida's Magic Kingdom. Fantasyland's attractions are generally dark rides that take visitors through scenes from Disney Animation's films such as Snow White and the Seven Dwarfs, Peter Pan, and Pinocchio.

A new Beauty and the Beast sub-section opened in September 2020 as part of the theme park's largest expansion. A dark ride named Enchanted Tale of Beauty and the Beast is housed in the new Beauty and the Beast Castle with Maurice's Cottage and Gaston's Fountain at its entrance. The new section also houses Belle's Village which includes the La Taverne de Gaston eatery, and Village Shoppes selling souvenirs and gifts.

A new stage show venue named Fantasyland Forest Theatre is also part of the expansion. With a capacity of 1,500 people, the venue will introduce a 25-minute Mickey's Magical Music World show.

=== Toontown ===
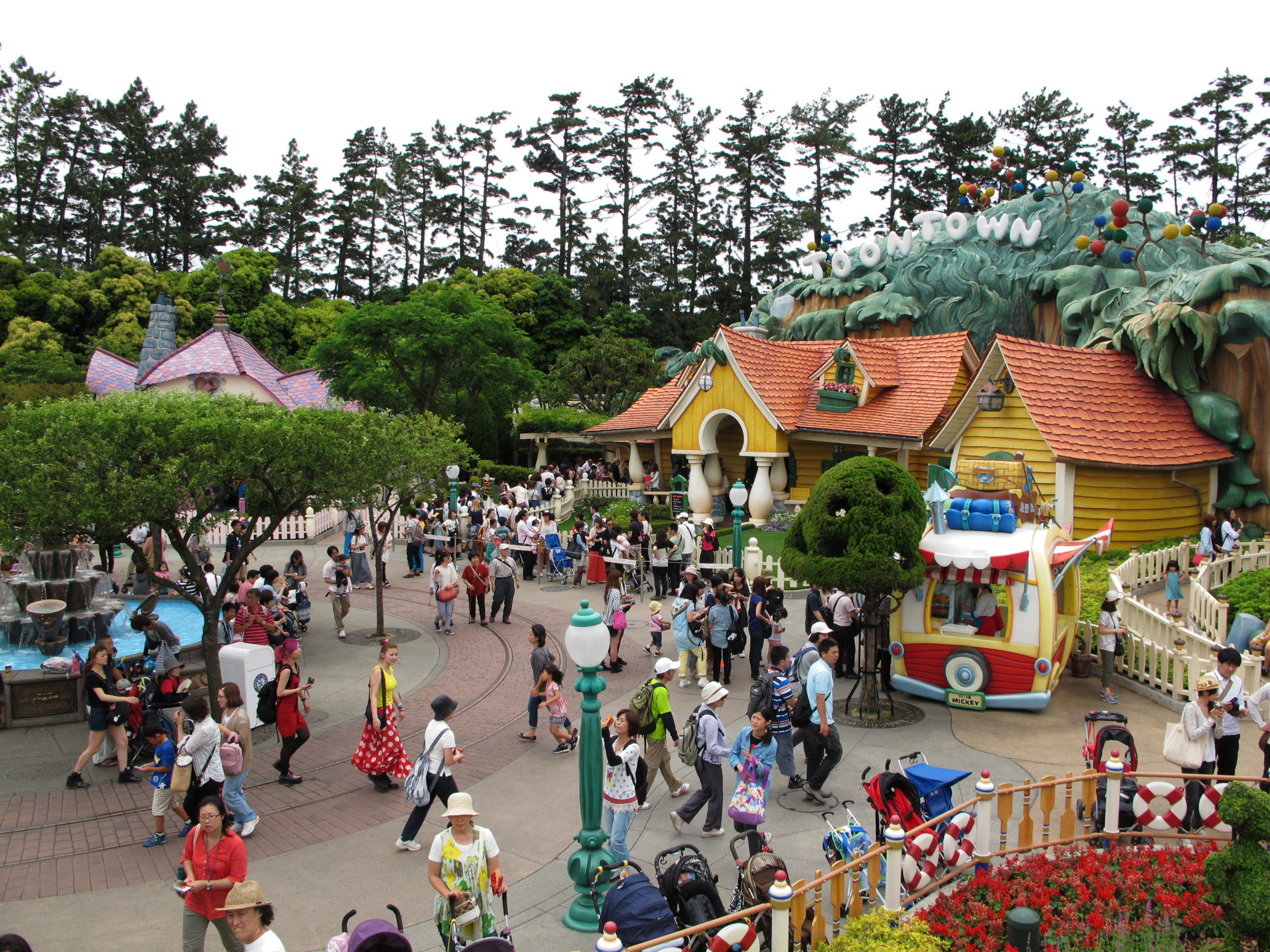
Toontown

Like its counterpart at Disneyland, Toontown (called "Mickey's Toontown" at Disneyland) is heavily inspired by the 1988 film Who Framed Roger Rabbit. The area features two rides; Roger Rabbit's Car Toon Spin and Gadget's Go Coaster. Other attractions include Mickey's House and Meet Mickey, Minnie's House, Goofy's Paint 'n' Play House, Donald's Boat, Chip 'n Dale's Treehouse, and Toon Park.

A new attraction named Minnie's Style Studio opened in September 2020 as part of the theme park's largest expansion. As a character greeting area, it allows guests to take photos with Minnie who will be wearing a rotating selection of seasonal outfits.

=== Tomorrowland ===
As is the case with other modern-day Disney theme parks, Tokyo Disneyland's Tomorrowland forgoes a realism-based vision of the future and instead features science-fiction fantasy themes. Architecturally it borrows much from the 1971–1993 version of Florida's Tomorrowland. Rides include Space Mountain, and Star Tours – The Adventures Continue.

A rotating car ride named The Happy Ride with Baymax opened in September 2020 as part of the theme park's largest expansion. The ride is the first Disney attraction to be themed based on Disney Animation's 2014 film Big Hero 6. A new specialty space-themed popcorn shop named The Big Pop also opened on the same day.

== Future attractions ==
The park is expected to receive an attraction, Sugar Rush: Sweet Rescue, based on Disney Animation's 2012 film, Wreck-It Ralph, which was originally set to open in 2026 but was delayed to Spring 2027 as well as the third renovation of Space Mountain, which is under the name of Space Mountain: Earthrise in Tomorrowland, which will reopen in 2027, and the surrounding area will be called Tomorrowland Plaza.

== Attendance ==
year	visitors
2006	12,900,000
2007	13,906,000
2008	14,293,000
2009	13,646,000
2010	14,452,000
2011	13,996,000
2012	14,847,000
2013	17,214,000
2014	17,300,000
2015	16,600,000
2016	16,540,000
2017	16,600,000
2018	17,907,000
2019	17,910,000
2020	4,160,000
2021	6,300,000
2022	12,000,000
2023	15,100,000
2024	15,104,000

== See also ==
- List of Tokyo Disneyland attractions
- Rail transport in Walt Disney Parks and Resorts
- Tokyo DisneySea
- Universal Studios Japan
- Legoland Japan Resort
