= Chip 'n' Dale's Gadgetcoaster =

Junior roller coaster

Chip 'n' Dale's GADGETcoaster
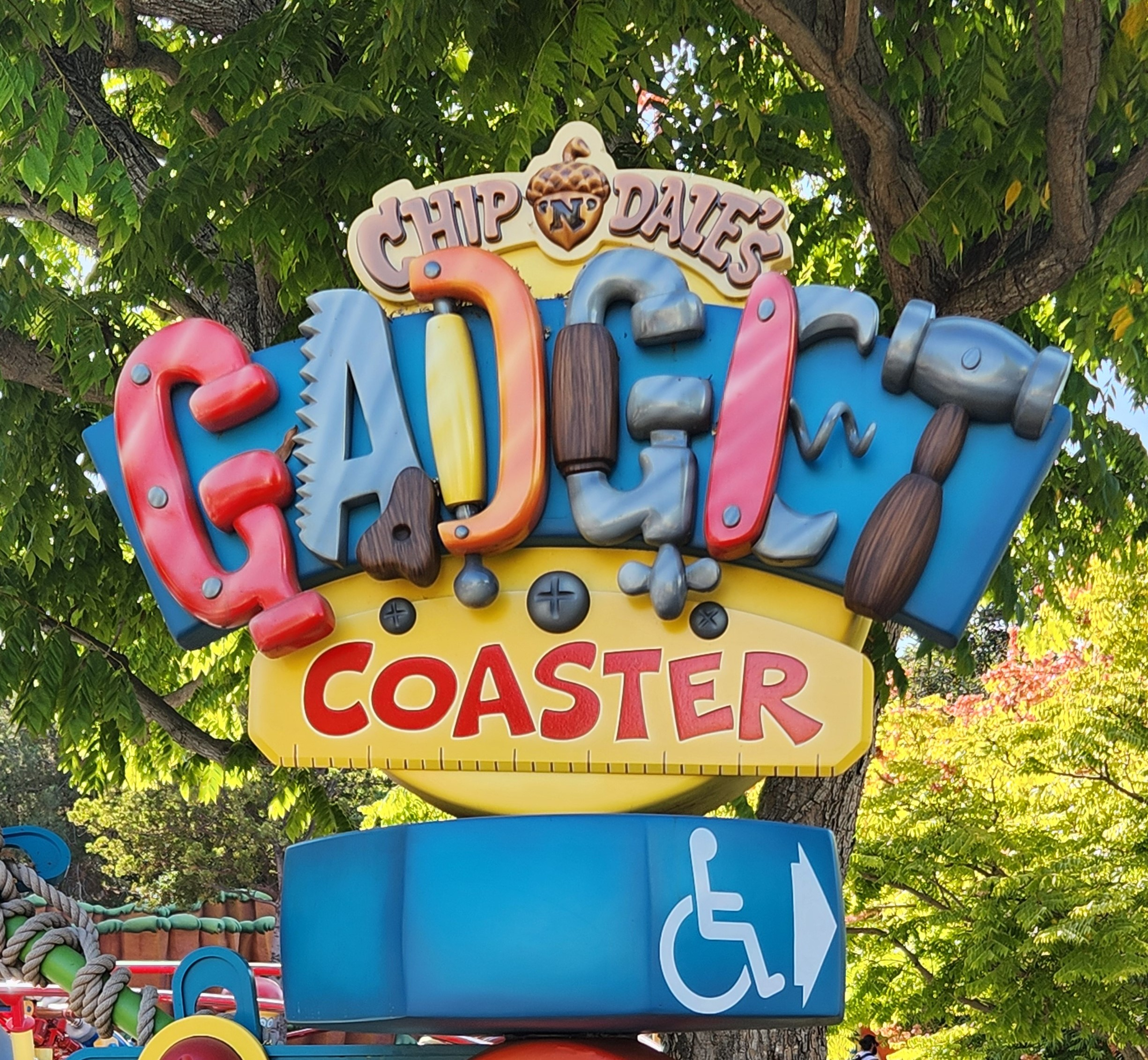
- Attraction sign at Disneyland

Disneyland
- Park section: Mickey's Toontown
- Coordinates: 33°48′54.9″N 117°55′9.5″W
- Status: Operating
- Opening date: January 24, 1993
- Chip 'n' Dale's GADGETcoaster at Disneyland at RCDB

Tokyo Disneyland
- Name: Gadget's Go Coaster
- Park section: Toontown
- Coordinates: 35.630700°N 139.878705°E
- Status: Operating
- Opening date: April 15, 1996
- Chip 'n' Dale's Gadgetcoaster at Tokyo Disneyland at RCDB

General statistics
- Type: Steel – Junior
- Manufacturer: Vekoma
- Designer: Walt Disney Imagineering
- Model: Junior Coaster (207m)
- Height: 27.9 ft (8.5 m)
- Length: 679.2 ft (207.0 m)
- Speed: 21.7 mph (34.9 km/h)
- Duration: 0:44
- Capacity: 780 riders per hour
- Height restriction: 35 in (89 cm)
- Trains: 2 trains with 8 cars. Riders are arranged 2 across in 2 rows for a total of 32 riders per train.
- Sponsors: Aflac (Tokyo)

Chip 'n' Dale's Gadgetcoaster (stylized as Chip 'n' Dale's GADGETcoaster, and known as Gadget's Go Coaster in Tokyo Disneyland) is a junior roller coaster at Disneyland in Anaheim, California, and Tokyo Disneyland in Urayasu, Chiba. It is based on the work of the character Gadget Hackwrench from the Disney animated series Chip 'n Dale: Rescue Rangers (1989–1990). Gadget is depicted on top of a small weathervane on the roof of the loading station, as well as on a postage stamp in the attraction's loading area. The Disneyland version also includes a static figure of Gadget before the coaster's lift hill.

Both versions of the attraction are located in Mickey's Toontown, and the Disneyland version opened as Gadget's Go Coaster on January 24, 1993, along with the rest of Mickey's Toontown. The Tokyo Disneyland version opened on April 15, 1996. At 44 and 56 seconds respectively, it is the shortest attraction in Disneyland. The Disneyland version closed in March 2022 for a refurbishment and reopened in March 2023, with its current name as well as some new features.

== Ride ==
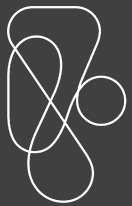
Track layout

=== Disneyland Version ===
The ride is primarily for children with eight small cars. While two children can fit into a single car, most adults would have to travel alone (or with a small child).

Before traveling up a lift hill, riders pass by a figure of Gadget (voiced by Tress MacNeille) as she says various comments. After the lift hill, riders then travel down and around Toon Lake. Near the end of the ride (the fastest turn), riders pass in-between a figure of Chip blowing through a straw with Zipper, and a figure of Dale holding a cup as Chip attempts to shoot water above riders' heads into the cup. The coaster comes to a stop and pulls into the station.

The attraction was closed for a refurbishment in March 2022 and reopened in March 2023 with its current name and also received new character figures Chip, Dale, Gadget and Zipper from the television series.

=== Tokyo Disneyland Version ===
The Go Coaster has the same cart design as the Disneyland version. Guests board a train fashioned from acorns and scavenged parts.

== Attraction facts ==
=== Disneyland ===
- Name: Gadget's Go Coaster (1993–2022); Chip 'n' Dale's GADGETcoaster (2023–present)
- Grand opening: January 24, 1993
- Designers: Walt Disney Imagineering, Vekoma, TOGO
- Number of Trains: 1
  - Capacity per Train: 16
  - Number of Cabs per Train: 8
  - Maximum seating capacity: 2 per row
  - Train theme: Hand built acorn pods by Gadget
- Height requirement: 35" (89 cm)
- Ride length: 44 seconds
- Ride system: Roller coaster
- Sponsor: Sparkle Paper Towels (A Georgia-Pacific Company)

=== Tokyo Disneyland ===
- Grand opening: April 15, 1996
- Designers: Walt Disney Imagineering, Vekoma
- Number of Trains: 2
  - Capacity per Train: 16
  - Number of Cabs per Train: 8
  - Maximum seating capacity: 2 per row
- Ride length: 0:56
- Ride system: Roller coaster
- Sponsor: Aflac Incorporated

== Image gallery ==
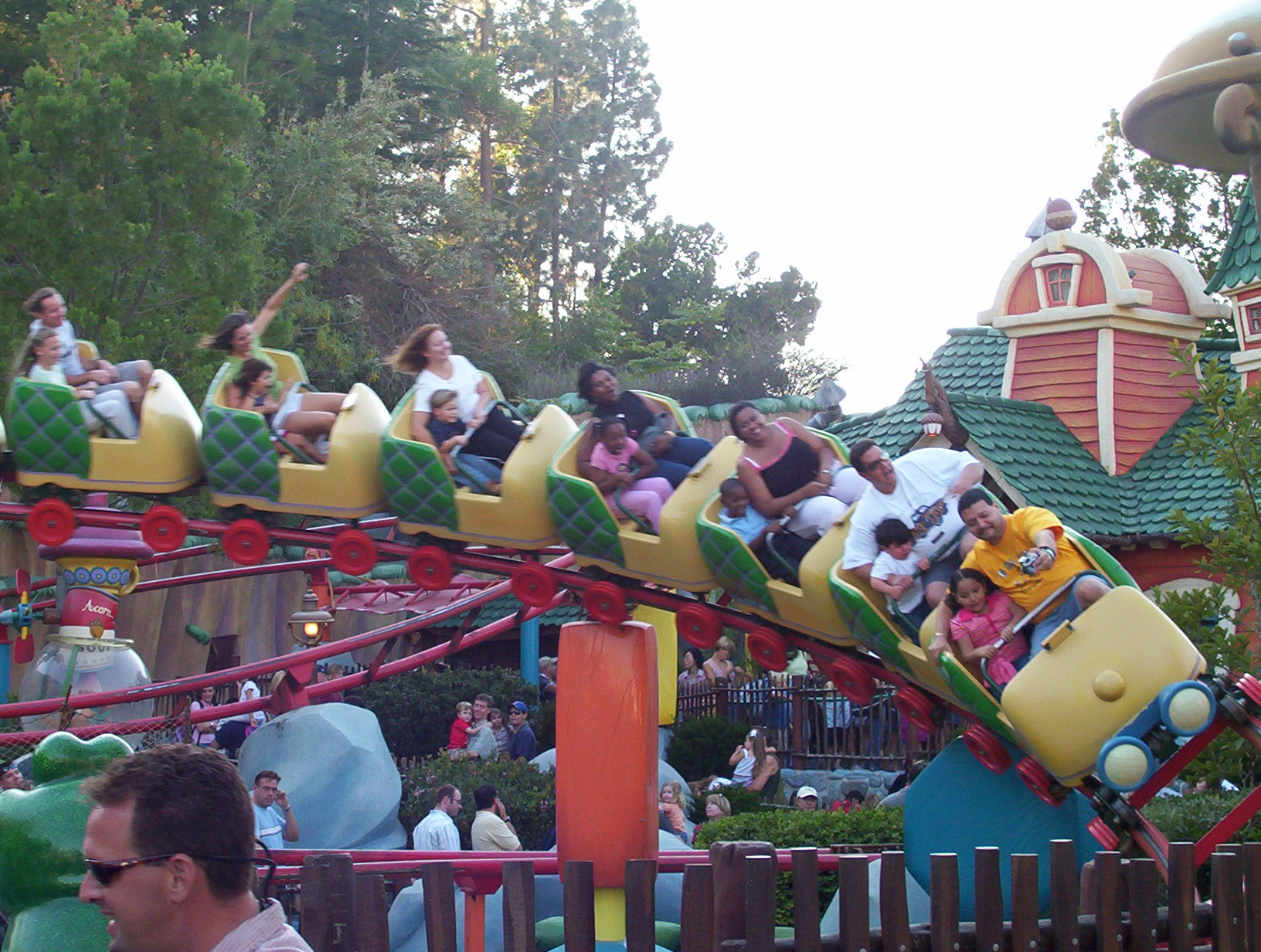
Chip 'n' Dale's GADGETcoaster, Disneyland

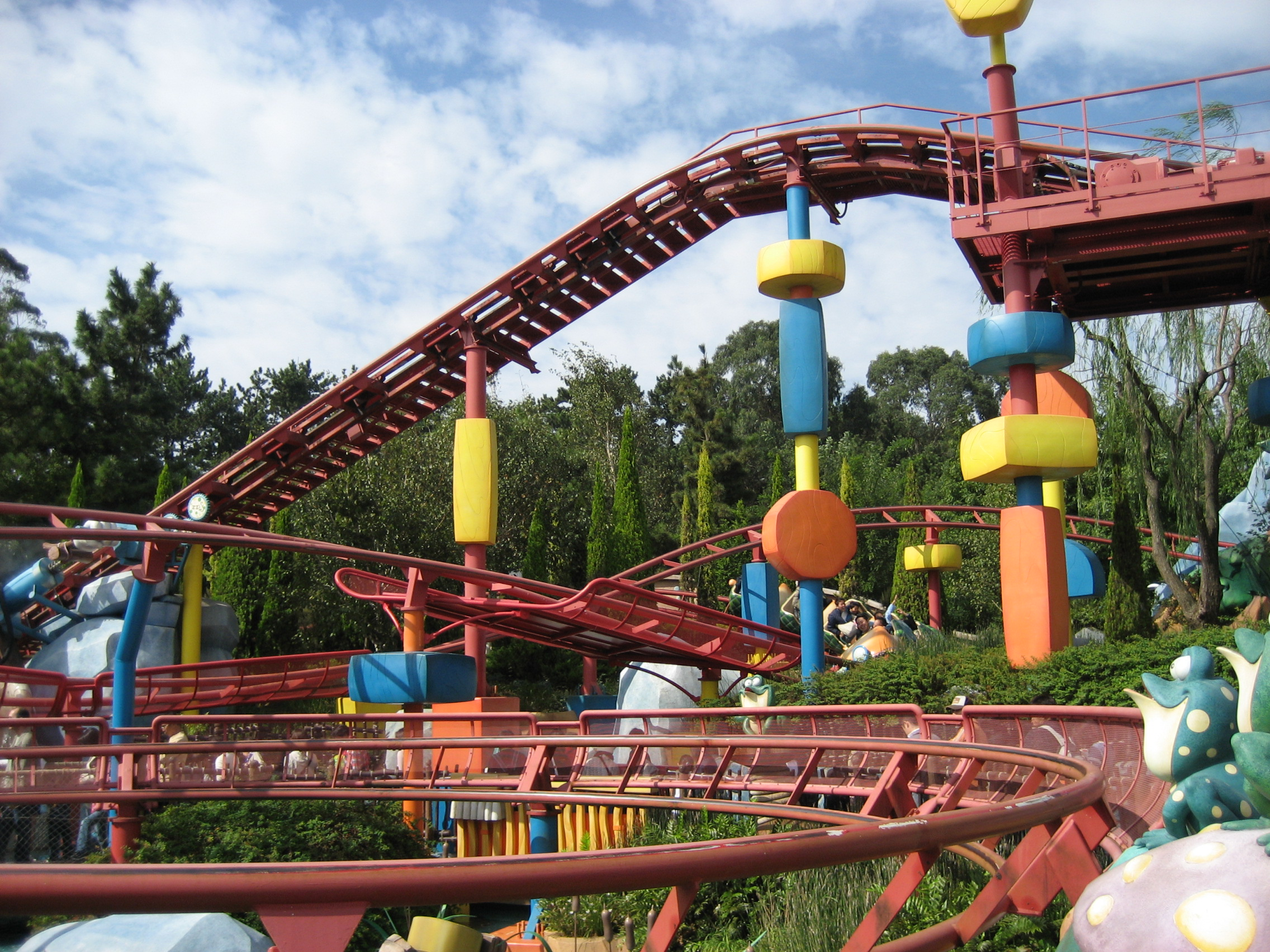
Gadget's Go Coaster, Tokyo Disneyland

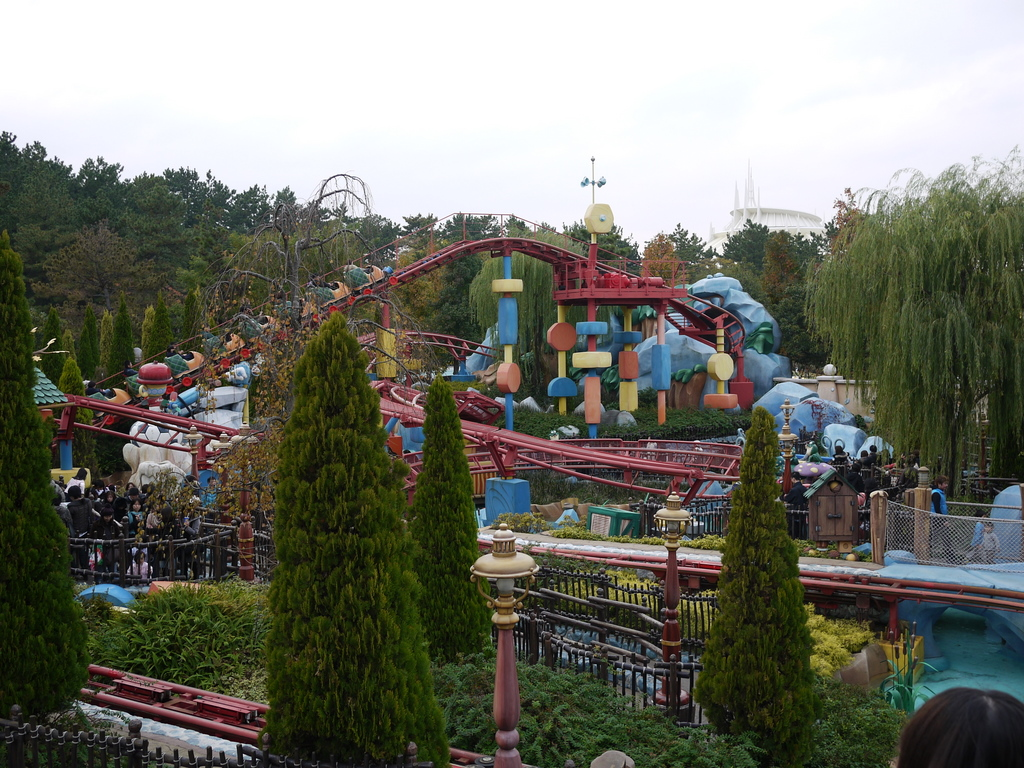
The coaster at Tokyo Disneyland

== Related attractions ==
- Magic Kingdom
  - The Barnstormer

== See also ==
- List of Disneyland attractions
- List of amusement rides based on television franchises
