= Blaine Gibson =

Blaine Gibson may refer to:

- Blaine Gibson (sculptor) (1918–2015), sculptor for Disney parks attractions
- Blaine Gibson, a content producer at Rooster Teeth Productions
