= Le Château de la Belle au Bois Dormant =

Castle at Disneyland Paris

Disneyland Park (Paris)
- Area: Fantasyland
- Coordinates: 48°52′23.34″N 2°46′33.68″E
- Status: Operating
- Opening date: 12 April 1992

Ride statistics
- Attraction type: Walkthrough
- Designer: Walt Disney Imagineering
- Theme: Sleeping Beauty
- Height: 50.9 m (167 ft)
- Audio-Animatronics: 1
- Wheelchair accessible

Le Château de la Belle au Bois Dormant (French for "The Castle of the Beauty in the Sleeping Forest", but known more roughly in English as "Sleeping Beauty Castle") is the fairy tale castle at the centre of Disneyland Park and a continuation of Sleeping Beauty Castle first seen at Disneyland in California.

The Castle features two attractions: a lower dungeon area in the base featuring an audio-animatronic dragon, La Tanière du Dragon ("The Lair of the Dragon"), and an upper concrete balcony walkthrough area with Sleeping Beauty–themed stained glass windows and tapestries, La Galerie de la Belle au Bois Dormant ("Sleeping Beauty Gallery"). There are also several shops selling glass figures, ornaments, and gifts.

== Development ==
Sleeping Beauty Castle at Disneyland was inspired by the Neuschwanstein Castle in Southern Germany. This European influence was fine for building a castle in Anaheim, but the fact that castles exist just down the road from Disneyland Paris challenged us to think twice about our design.

— Tony Baxter, executive designer Walt Disney Imagineering

Since Europe is home to the castles that inspired the structures at Disney's first three parks, Imagineers reconsidered what kind of edifice would stand at the hub of its first European theme park. Many different concepts were then created and considered, ranging from slightly modified versions of Disney's existing castles to radically new structures to stand instead in the Castle's place (for example a Discoveryland-like tower).

The team eventually settled on Imagineer Tom Morris' approach to the established Disney castle. Inspirations cited by Imagineering include illustrations from the book of hours Les Très Riches Heures du Duc de Berry and the Mont Saint-Michel monastery in Normandy. As Charles Perrault had not detailed the castle in his 1697 fairy tale, Imagineering had few restrictions regarding its physical appearance. However, Walt Disney's own 1959 film Sleeping Beauty provided the inspiration for, among other things, the Castle's surrounding square trees.

The realisation of the stained glass windows in London, which are visible in Sleeping Beauty's Gallery, was overseen by Peter Chapman, who had previously worked on the restoration of Notre Dame de Paris.

Completed in 1992, for the park's 12 April opening, Le Château de la Belle au Bois Dormant stands 50 meters (160 ft) tall.

== Overview ==
Like all Disney castles, the castle is positioned to ensure that the sun never passes behind it. It is also the only one to feature a dragon, with the 24 metre-long (79 foot) animatronic weighing more than two tons. The dragon was the largest Audio-Animatronics figure yet built when the park opened in 1992. The walkthrough attraction consists of a dimly lit cavern with the large dragon sleeping. Occasionally it will wake up, puffing smoke, growling, flapping its wings and lunging its head. The building also contains La Galerie de la Belle au Bois Dormant, a gallery of displays which illustrate the story of Sleeping Beauty in tapestries, stained glass windows and figures. La Boutique du Château, a shop selling Christmas ornaments year-round, and Merlin l'Enchanteur, a shop specialising in handmade glass figures, are located on ground floor.

== History ==
The castle has received several overlays throughout the years.

=== 1st anniversary (1993) ===
The first occurred during the park's first anniversary celebration in 1993, when the castle was dressed up as a cake complete with strawberries, icing and candles. This overlay was removed after the celebration ended. The cake overlay concept was later copied by Walt Disney World's Cinderella Castle in 1996 for the 25th anniversary of the resort.

=== 5th anniversary (1997) ===
During the fifth anniversary of Disneyland Paris in 1997, the castle was decorated in carnival masks, jester hats, frills and bells to promote the animated film The Hunchback of Notre Dame. This overlay lasted until the beginning of 1998.

=== 10th anniversary and the opening of Walt Disney Studios Park (2002) ===
During the tenth anniversary of Disneyland Paris in 2002, the front of the castle was fitted with a golden scroll displaying a large 10. The celebration began with the opening of Walt Disney Studios (now known as Disney Adventure World) next door. The scroll and other anniversary material in the park were removed in 2003.

=== 15th anniversary and Mickey's Magical Party (2007–2009) ===
In 2007, the castle received another overlay, celebrating the park's fifteenth anniversary. It featured golden Disney characters displayed on the turrets and spires, each holding a candle, and Tinkerbell on the highest spire. The candles were illuminated each night during a special 'Candlebration' ceremony which took place on a raised temporary stage at Central Plaza, in front of the Castle. A huge illuminated gold plaque featuring a large '15' was hung on the front of the castle. This echoed the overlay from the tenth anniversary in 2002. The fifteenth anniversary and the 'Candlebration' ceremony ended on 7 March 2009.

The fifteenth anniversary overlay quickly followed on 4 April 2009 by Mickey's Magical Party, a "theme year" celebration held at the park. The castle was again overlaid, this time with a Mickey and Friends plaque over the main window, and the spire heads were changed from being characters to being 3 circles "of ribbon" representing Mickey Mouse. A more permanent Central Plaza stage was built outside the castle to host the "It's dance time... with Mickey and Friends" show. The overlay was removed in 2010

=== 20th anniversary repainting ===
The castle was repainted in a new colour-scheme, restored and fitted with multicolored LED lighting during 2011 and again in 2021. For the Disney Dreams nighttime spectacular show its moat was fitted with water fountains, the upper window was replaced by a door that slides down to reveal a LED lighted star, 2 lasers were also placed in the hills the caste lies in. Central Plaza stage was removed in order to increase the viewing area. 2 projectors were placed on top of shops in Main Street, U.S.A to cover the full castle with projection mapping, which replaced the old ones which were used since 2005 for Wishes.

=== 30th anniversary renovation ===
The castle was refurbished in 2021 in advance of the park's 30th anniversary celebration in 2022. For the renovation, the castle was wrapped in a decorative scrim.

== Popular culture ==
- In Epic Mickey the castle was adapted into the game's starting and finishing level, Dark Beauty Castle. This version contained elements of the various Disney castles and even had statues resembling Disney characters.
- In Epic Mickey 2: The Power of Two, the castle was also adapted into the game's starting level, the Dark Beauty Castle starts to collapse from an earthquake.

== See also ==
- Sleeping Beauty Castle
- Cinderella Castle
- Castle of Magical Dreams
- Enchanted Storybook Castle
