= Voyage to the Crystal Grotto =

Amusement ride at Shanghai Disneyland

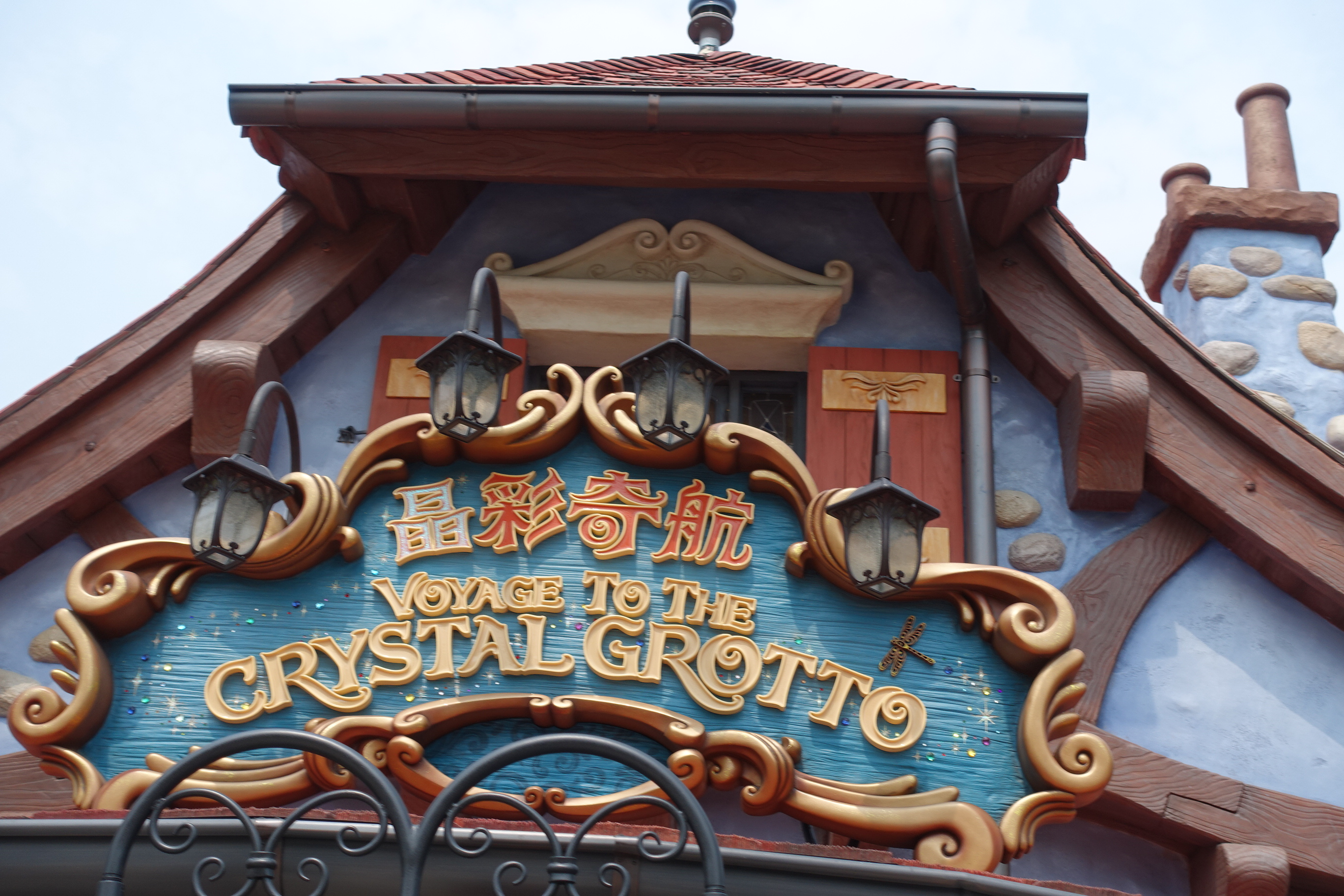

Shanghai Disneyland Park
- Area: Fantasyland
- Status: Operating
- Soft opening date: May 9, 2016
- Opening date: June 16, 2016

Ride statistics
- Attraction type: Boat ride
- Theme: Walt Disney Animation Studios
- Wheelchair accessible

Voyage to the Crystal Grotto (Chinese: 晶彩奇航; pinyin: Jīng cǎi qí háng; lit. 'Strange Colorful Crystal Ship') is a tow boat ride that is currently operating at Shanghai Disneyland Park. The ride is the first ride to take riders inside a Disney castle and opened along with the rest of the park on June 16, 2016.

== Ride experience ==
The ride is described officially as "an enchanting excursion that travels the waters of Fantasyland. Fanciful fountains and sculptures line the water’s edge, celebrating classic tales of magic and imagination. At journey’s end, guests glide beneath Enchanted Storybook Castle, into a secret, underground chamber in which fountains of light leap and dance in shimmering pools, surrounding guests with magic, music and color. The experience is sure to inspire the dreams and imaginations of all who make this wondrous voyage."

The boat takes riders past sculpture gardens featuring characters from Disney movies such as Beauty and the Beast, Aladdin, The Sorcerer's Apprentice from Fantasia, Tangled, Mulan, and The Little Mermaid. Afterwards, the boat glides into a chamber underneath the Enchanted Storybook Castle, which has "fountains of light", music, and water effects.
