= Pirates of the Caribbean: Battle for the Sunken Treasure =

Dark ride at Shanghai Disneyland Park

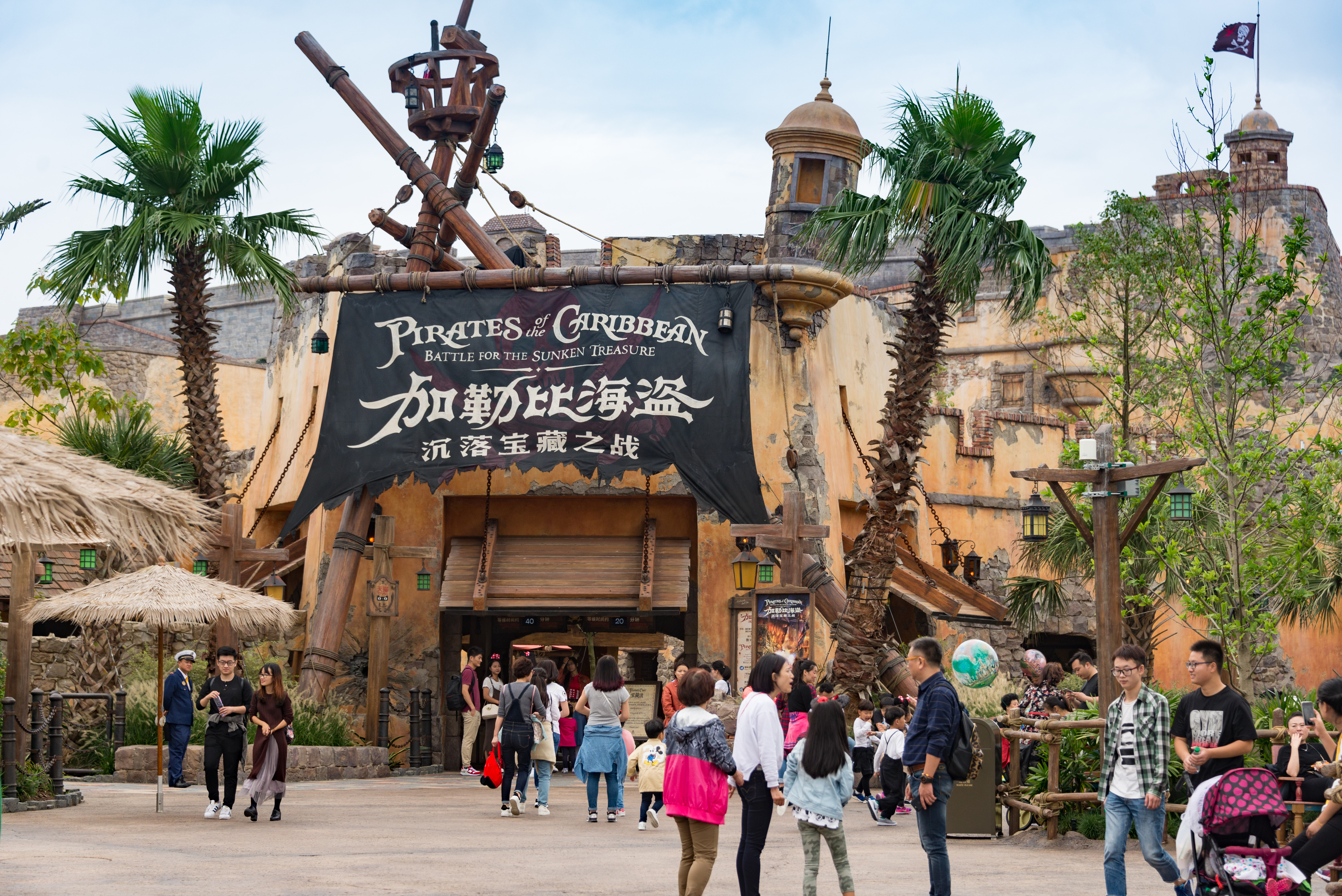

Shanghai Disneyland Park
- Area: Treasure Cove
- Status: Operating
- Cost: $450 million
- Opening date: June 16, 2016

Ride statistics
- Attraction type: Dark ride
- Designer: Walt Disney Imagineering
- Theme: Pirates of the Caribbean
- Music: Hans Zimmer
- Manufacture: Sansei Technologies
- Sponsor: Tmall
- Single rider line available
- Must transfer from wheelchair

Pirates of the Caribbean: Battle for the Sunken Treasure (Chinese: 加勒比海盗: 沉落宝藏之战; pinyin: Jiālèbǐ Hǎidào: Chénluò bǎozàng zhī zhàn) is a magnetic powered dark ride at Shanghai Disneyland. Based on the eponymous film series, the attraction features a different storyline from previous Pirates of the Caribbean rides. The ride opened along with the rest of the park on June 16, 2016. Walt Disney Imagineering designed the attraction and Industrial Light & Magic created the computer-generated visual effects.

== Ride experience ==
The ride features animatronics of Jack Sparrow and Davy Jones. It features new technology not used in previous iterations of the Pirates of the Caribbean ride. Guests start at the Royal Navy’s former fortress and pass the Barbossa’s Bounty restaurant. From there, guests enter the Caves of Misfortune, where Jack Sparrow is. Afterwards, guests enter the Graveyard of Lost Ships, where the Flying Dutchman's remains and the Kraken await. After that, the guests sail through the graveyard of lost ships surrounded by treasures followed by Davy Jones' lair. Guests then enter a sea battle between the Dutchman and the Black Pearl. Finally, after a backwards drop, guests return to the fort, which Jack has now filled with his gold.
