= Shanghai Disneyland =

Theme park

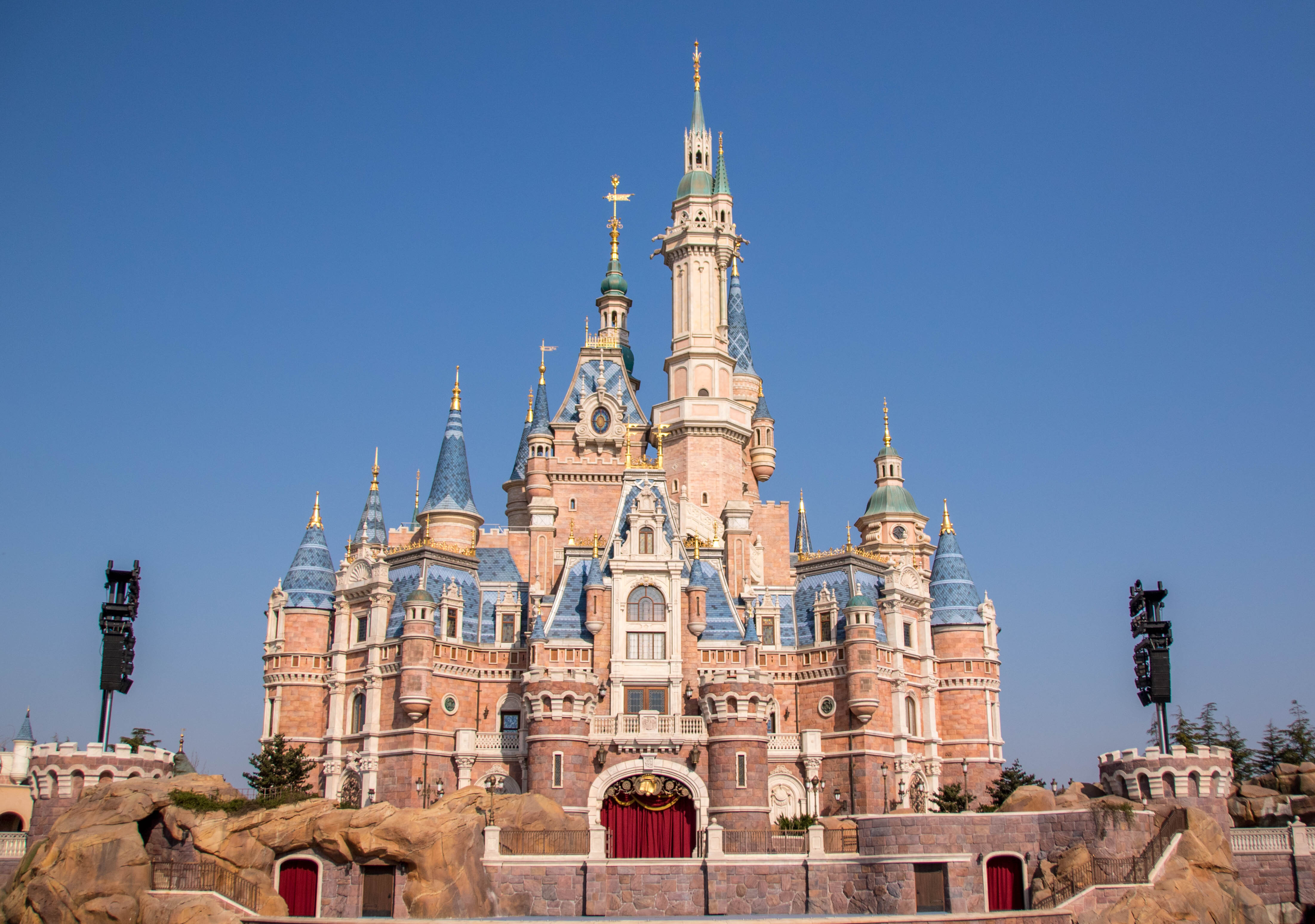
- The Enchanted Storybook Castle, landmark of Shanghai Disneyland
- Interactive map of Shanghai Disneyland
- Location: Shanghai Disney Resort, Pudong, Shanghai, China
- Coordinates: 31.1440°N 121.6570°E
- Status: Operating
- Opened: June 16, 2016; 10 years ago
- Owner: Shanghai Shendi Group (57%); The Walt Disney Company (43%)
- Operated by: Shanghai Shendi Group; Disney Parks International (Disney Experiences)
- Theme: Fairy tales, future, pirates, adventure and Disney characters
- Website: Shanghai Disneyland

Shanghai Disneyland (Chinese: 上海迪士尼乐园; Pinyin: Shànghǎi díshìní lèyuán, Shanghainese: Zaon-he Diq-zy-nyi Loq-yoe) is a theme park located in Chuansha New Town, Pudong, Shanghai, China, that is part of the Shanghai Disney Resort. The park is operated by Disney Experiences and Shanghai Shendi Group, through a joint venture between the Walt Disney Company and Shendi. Construction began on April 8, 2011. The park opened on June 16, 2016. The park operated in its first half-year with a visitor attendance of 5.60 million guests.

The park covers an area of 3.9 square kilometres (1.5 sq mi), costing 24.5 billion RMB, with Shendi group holding 57% and Disney holding the remaining 43%. The park currently has eight themed areas: Mickey Avenue, Gardens of Imagination, Fantasyland, Treasure Cove, Adventure Isle, Tomorrowland, Toy Story Land, and Zootopia. In 2024, the park hosted 14.7 million visitors, making it the most visited theme park in China, the third-most visited theme park in Asia and the fifth-most visited theme park in the world that year.

== History ==
=== Preparations ===
The Chinese government approved the resort on November 4, 2009. The Walt Disney Company announced on November 5, 2010, that it had signed an agreement with Shanghai Shendi Group to build the resort and park in Shanghai, with a planned opening in 2015. On April 7, 2011, groundbreaking began at the Shanghai Disneyland Resort site. On June 29, 2013, construction on the Enchanted Storybook Castle began.

=== Construction ===
Major construction work started on April 8, 2011, targeting a spring 2016 opening. The resort was planned to cover an area of 4 km^{2} (1.5 sq mi) and it was expected to cost CN¥ 25 billion (US$3.66 billion). The project is financed by several large Chinese state-owned enterprises in Shanghai forming a joint venture with the Walt Disney Company. "The first-phase of the project will be to the South of Huanglou Area, an area in Chuansha Town, the southeast suburbs of Shanghai's Pudong area; the second phase will extend further southwest," an urban developer from Shanghai stated. DeSimone Consulting Engineers were the structural engineers behind the construction work.

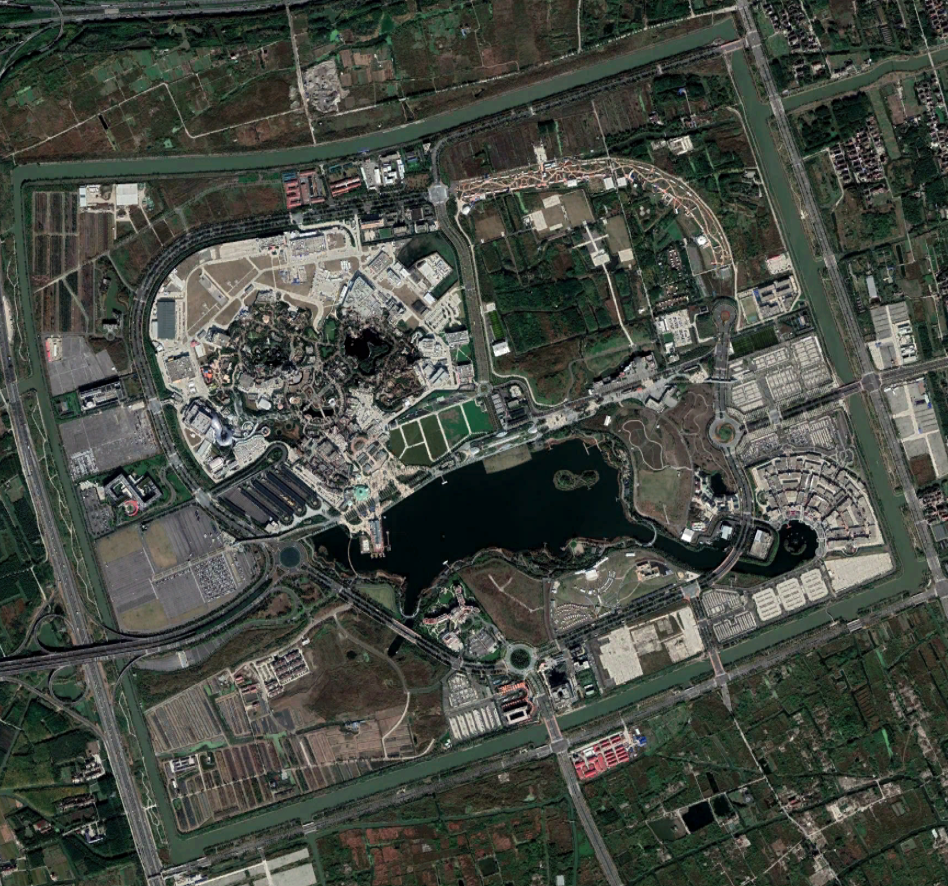
A satellite view of the resort in 2018.

On March 8, 2013, the company announced that the park would open in late 2015. On February 2, 2015, the opening date was pushed back to early 2016. On January 12, 2016, the park's opening date was announced as June 16, 2016, its final opening date.

The cost was initially estimated at 24.5 billion yuan (US$3.7 billion) for the theme park and an additional 4.5 billion yuan (US$700 million). That rose to around US$5.5 billion before delays, which was partly due to more attractions opening to the public on the first day, which added US$800 million to the cost. In addition to the attractions and two hotels, a high-speed rail system is being built to get visitors to and from the site. Disney owns 43% of the property, and the state-controlled Shanghai Shendi Group owns the remaining 57%.

=== Opening ===
On May 7, 2016, Shanghai Disneyland had started soft openings.

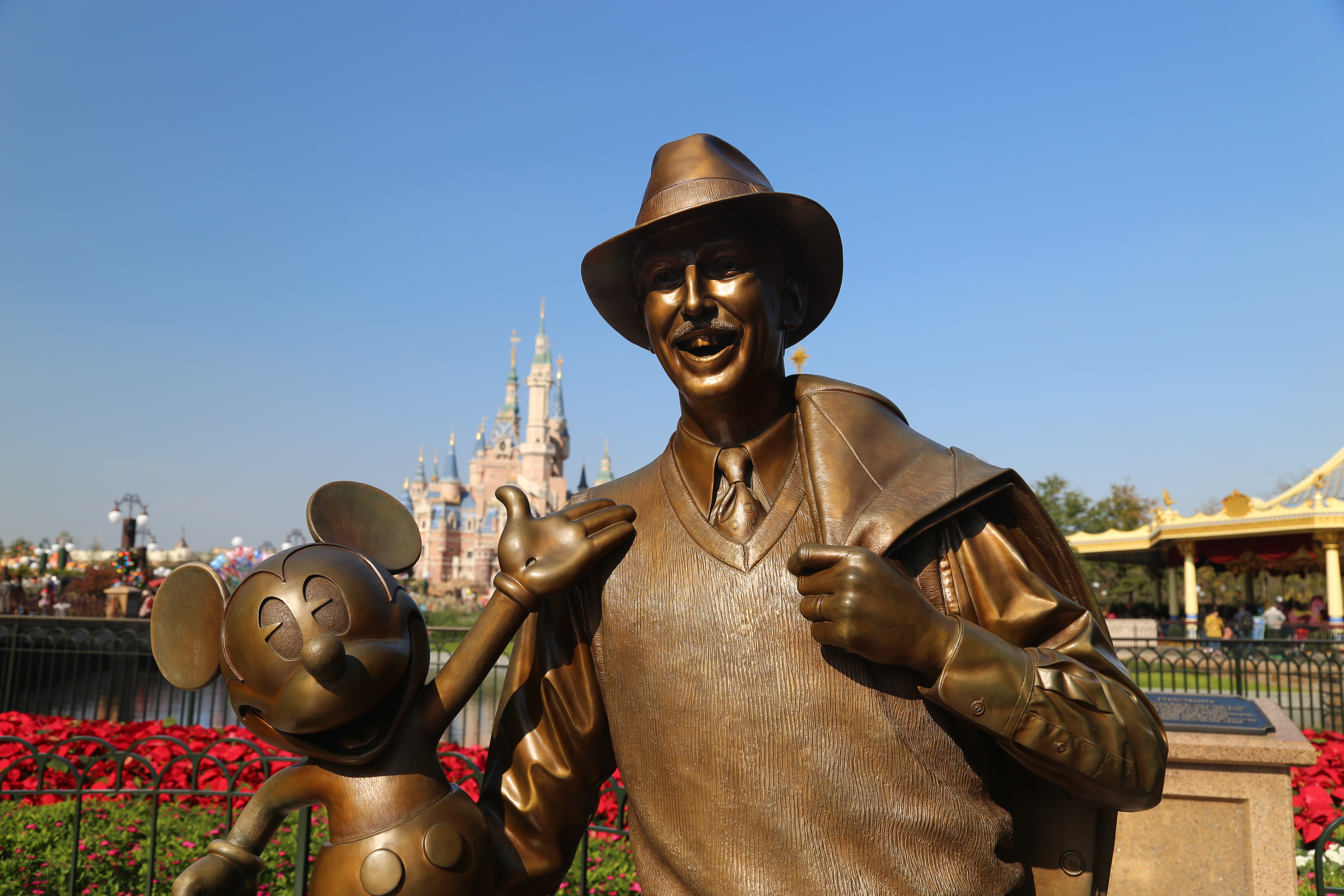
Storytellers by Rick Terry and Ray Spencer

Disney aired the live broadcast of the grand opening show on its Facebook and the Disney TV stations on the night of June 15, 2016. Bob Iger, the chairman and chief executive officer of The Walt Disney Company, was joined by nearly 3,000 distinguished guests and celebrities for a showcase of choreography, acrobatics, costumes, and technology on grand scale, with dazzling lights, Disney music, pageantry, special effects, and fireworks. The show featured world-renowned pianist Lang Lang, who performed a custom arrangement of the musical sensation "Let It Go" (from Disney's Frozen) and China's television and movie actress Sun Li took center stage. The historic event included the debut of an original song, "Ignite the Dreamer Within", written especially for the grand opening of Shanghai Disneyland. Acclaimed composer and conductor Tan Dun, known for his scores for the films Crouching Tiger, Hidden Dragon and Hero, led the Shanghai Symphony with an original composition of the new song.

As the opening was met with rainy weather, Chinese Vice Premier Wang Yang told Iger that the rain is an auspicious sign of dollars and renminbi to come. Wang then read a brief message of congratulations from Chinese leader Xi Jinping, who said: "By adding to the classic Disney style a stroke of Chinese characteristics, and by blending international standards with best local practices, the resort demonstrates our commitment to cross-cultural cooperation."

=== Ticket pricing ===
Tickets for the park went on sale on March 28, 2016, with a two-tiered pricing scheme. On most days, day adult tickets will be CN¥ 370, while child and elderly one-day tickets will cost CN¥ 280, roughly 20% cheaper than Hong Kong Disneyland (which charges HK$539 for a day adult ticket). During busier periods, including the first two weeks of the park's operation, adult day tickets will cost CN¥ 499, while child and elderly tickets will cost CN¥ 375. The park will be the first Disney park to feature tiered pricing.

According to the International Business Times (IBT), the equivalent of park ticket pricing will cost about US$75 for adults and US$60 for children on holidays and weekends, and around US$60 for adults and US$45 for children on weekdays. IBT notes that "a two-day weekend ticket for two adults and one child comes close to China's average urban monthly wage."

Opening day tickets sold out in a few hours after they had gone on sale at midnight, March 28. However, more tickets were put on sale several days before the official opening day.

As of 2025, ticket pricing ranges from ¥475 on Tuesday, Wednesday, and Thursday, to ¥499 on Monday, to ¥539 on Friday and Sunday, and ¥599 on Saturday. Shanghai Disneyland also offers early bird tickets, making tickets ¥50 cheaper when purchasing more than 10 days in advance.

=== Response to COVID-19 ===
In response to the COVID-19 pandemic, the park (which was the first Disney park to close) temporarily closed from January 25, 2020, following the actions of Ocean Park Hong Kong and Hong Kong Disneyland Park. It remained closed the following three and a half months, reopening to guests on May 11, 2020, becoming the first of the Disney Parks to reopen. It reopened under strict rules that included, but was not limited to, social distancing, reduced capacity, temperature screenings, and mandatory face masks. Shanghai Disney Resort closed for a second time due to an increase in COVID-19 cases in China from March 21, 2022, through June 29, 2022. The resort reopened for the second time on June 30, 2022. On October 31, 2022, it was announced that the park would once again close indefinitely due to a surge in cases. It last closed on November 29, 2022, before reopening again on December 8 after China eased its "zero COVID" policy in response to protests.

== Park layout ==
Unlike other Disney parks, Shanghai Disneyland does not feature a steam railroad surrounding the park's perimeter due to the Chinese already being accustomed to train travel. Shanghai Disneyland also has no earthen berm to obscure the outside world from guest view. As a replacement for a central-spoked/hub, the center of the park features a 4.5-hectare (11-acre) collection of Chinese zodiac gardens called the Gardens of Imagination. Main Street, USA has given way to Mickey Avenue, which introduces Chinese visitors to Disney characters. Conventional-themed lands such as Adventureland are reimagined into Adventure Isle, and other lands, such as Frontierland, are omitted entirely. Several staple attractions, such as Space Mountain, Jungle Cruise, and It's a Small World, are excluded as Disney wanted to avoid criticism of cultural imperialism. Restaurant seating has been revised upwards after studies found that Chinese guests take longer over meals, and extensive picnic areas are better adapted to extended families with grandparents. Also, there is more live entertainment as many Chinese patrons prefer that to thrill rides.

In regards to the layout of other Magic Kingdom parks, this park's layout is mirrored. Instead of being on the left side of main hub, Adventure Isle (Adventureland) is on the right side; while as Tomorrowland is now on the left side instead of the right. Fantasyland is located in the back behind the castle (Enchanted Storybook Castle).

The table below shows the Attractions, Dining places, Entertainments, and Shops in each theme land.

Name of Theme land	Attraction	Dining	Entertainment	Shops
Mickey Avenue	N/A	Mickey & Pals Market Café; CookieAnn Bakery Café; Il Paperino; Chip & Dale's Treehouse Treats	Mickey's Storybook Adventure; Mickey's Snow Magic (Winter only); Shanghai Disneyland Band	Avenue M Arcade; Sweethearts Confectionery; Whistle Stop Shop; Lucky Express; Carefree Corner; CookieAnn Bakery Café - Shop
Gardens of Imagination	Dumbo the Flying Elephant; Become Iron Man at the Marvel Universe; Fantasia Carousel; Marvel Universe	Timothy's Treats; Picnic Basket	ILLUMINATE! A Nighttime Celebration; Disney Winter Magic Cavalcade (Winter only); Mickey's Storybook Express; Disney Zootopia Celebration Projection; Tai Chi with Character	Wandering Moon Restaurant - Special Merchandise Exclusive Shop; Casey Jr. Trinket Train; Marvel Mementos; Scuttle's Shiny Things
Fantasyland	Peter Pan's Flight; Seven Dwarf's Mine Train; The Many Adventures of Winnie the Pooh; Voyage to the Crystal Grotto; Alice in Wonderland Maze; Enchanted Storybook Castle; Hunny Pot Spin; "Once Upon a Time" Adventure	Pinocchio Village Kitchen; Tangled Tree Tavern; Royal Banquet Hall; Fantasyland Mickey Mouse Hand Bun Outdoor Vending Cart; Troubadour Treats; Pooh and Friends Treats; Fairy Godmother's Cupboard	Frozen: A Sing-Along Celebration; Fantasy Festival; Fantasy Storytelling; Traveling Troubadours	Castle Encounters Bontique; Disney Painting Cart; Bibbidi Bobbidi Bontique; Fantasy Faire; Be Our Guest Boutique; Mickey & Minnie's Mercantile; Hundred Acre Goods; Cottage Curios; Mountainside Treasures
Treasure Cove	Pirates of the Caribbean Battle for the Sunken Treasure; Explorer Canoes; Shipwreck Shore; Siren's Revenge	Barbossa's Bounty; Captain's Kettle; Tortuga Treats; The Snackin' Kraken; Pintel & Ragetti's Grub to Grab	Eye of the Storm: Captain Jack's Stunt Spectacular; A Pirate's Life for You!; Pirates Roaming; Swabbie Fight; Voodoo Alley Fight	Doubloon Market; Jolly Gypsy
Adventure Isle	Roaring Rapids; Soaring Over the Horizon; Challenge Trails at Camp Discovery; Junior Explorers Camp; Vista Trail at Camp Discovery	Duffy and Friends Celebration Hall; Chipmunk Snacks	The Disney Explorer Band	Duffy and Friends Celebration Hall - Shop; Rainbow Frog Trinkets; Chip & Dale's Trading Post
Tomorrowland	Buzz Lightyear Planet Rescue; TRON Lightcycle Power Run; Jet Packs; Pixar Adventurous Journey; Space Chat with Stitch; TRON Realm, Chevrolet Digital Challenge	Stargazer Grill; Star Trail Snacks	Avengers Training Initiative; Club Destin-E; Disney Xiaotui: The Magical Recycle Bin; Space Chat with Stitch - Interact with Stitch; The JAMMitors	Tomorrowland Pin Trading Special Experience Area; Power supplies; Intergalactic Imports; Tomorrowland Pavilion Shop; The Light Stuff
Toy Story Land	Rex's Racer; Woody's Roundup; Slinky Dog Spin	Lotso Lunch Box	Toy Soldiers Bucket O' Fun	Al's Toy Barn
Zootopia	Zootopia: Hot Pursuit	Jumbeaux's Cafe; Zootopia Market	Disney Zootopia Comes Alive	Fashions by Fru Fru; Disney Painting Cart - Zootopia

=== Mickey Avenue ===
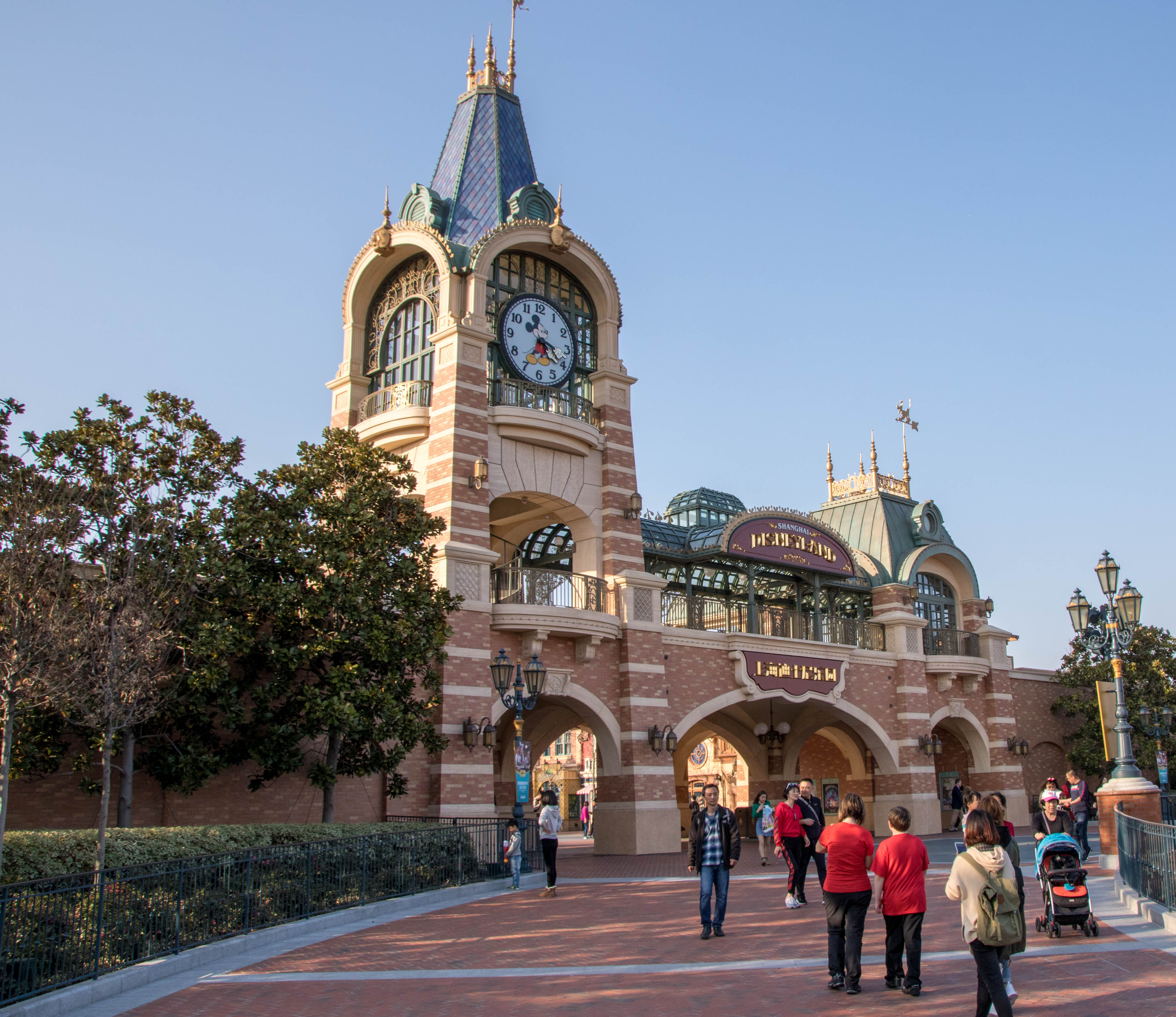
The entrance to the park, which leads onto Mickey Avenue.

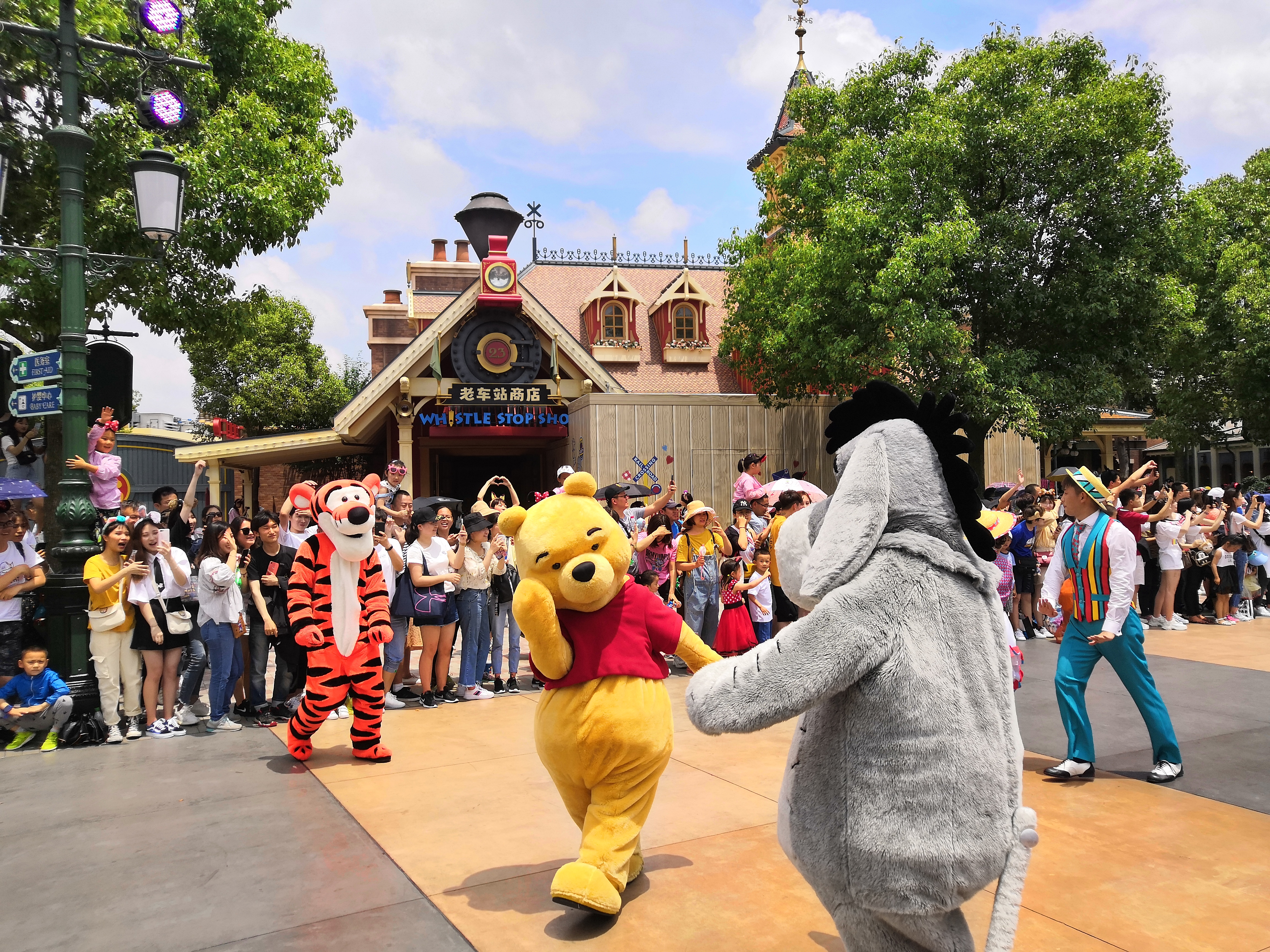
Pooh, Tigger, and Eeyore on Mickey Avenue

Mickey Avenue, the entrance of the park, is the park's equivalent to Main Street, USA. While the entrance building resembles a train station, there is no railroad circulating the park and it is used for character shows. The area is inspired by the personalities of Disney cartoon characters such as Mickey Mouse, Minnie Mouse, Donald Duck, and Chip 'n' Dale as well as Disney films, including Ratatouille, The Three Caballeros, and Lady and the Tramp. Avenue M Arcade, the largest gift shop in the park, is modeled after the Carthay Circle Theater. The Storytellers statue, which depicts a young Walt Disney and Mickey Mouse, is at the end of Mickey Avenue and in front of the Gardens of Imagination.

=== Gardens of Imagination ===
The hub of the park, this land features seven 4.5-hectare (11-acre) Chinese gardens with each of the twelve animals of the Chinese zodiac represented by Disney characters. Attractions include Dumbo the Flying Elephant, Fantasia Carousel, and Marvel Super Heroes at Marvel Universe, a meet-and-greet pavilion featuring Marvel characters. Entertainment includes castle stage shows as well as the nightly Illuminate! A Nighttime Celebration. Mickey's Storybook Express, a parade with a musical soundtrack and colorful performers, runs on the longest parade route in a Disney park.

=== Fantasyland ===
Fantasyland is the park's largest land themed to Disney animated films. The land features the 197 ft (60 m) Enchanted Storybook Castle, themed to Disney princesses. The castle is the largest in any Disney theme park and features the Royal Banquet Hall restaurant, a boutique, and Voyage to the Crystal Grotto, a boat ride around and under the castle that takes guests past scenes from films including Tangled, Aladdin, Mulan, Fantasia, The Little Mermaid and Beauty and the Beast. Attractions include Seven Dwarfs Mine Train, Peter Pan's Flight, The Many Adventures of Winnie the Pooh, Evergreen Playhouse (including For the First Time in Forever: A Frozen Sing-Along Celebration), Alice's Curious Labyrinth, a walk-through hedge maze inspired by the 1951 and 2010 versions film adaptations, and the Hunny Pot Spin, a spinning Teacups-style ride themed to The Many Adventures of Winnie the Pooh.

=== Treasure Cove ===
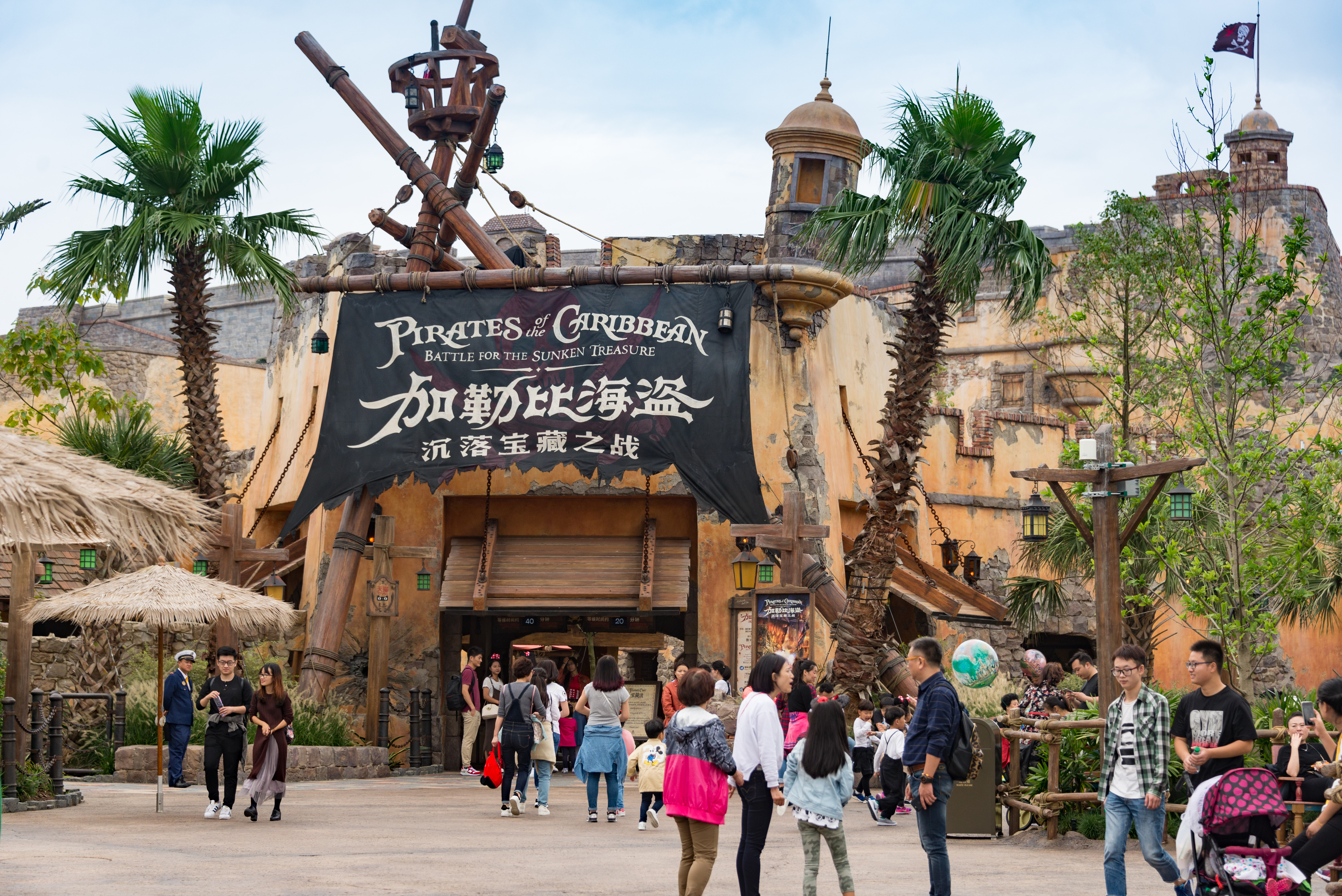
Entrance to Pirates of the Caribbean: Battle for the Sunken Treasure

Treasure Cove is themed to an 18th-century Spanish harbor town located on a Caribbean island that has been captured by Captain Jack Sparrow from Pirates of the Caribbean. The land's marquee attraction is Pirates of the Caribbean: Battle for the Sunken Treasure, a dark ride based on the films. Guests, riding in magnetically propelled boats, travel past audio-animatronic and projected depictions of Jack Sparrow and Davy Jones as the two battle against each other in attempt to seize the cove's sunken riches.

The land also is home to Eye of the Storm: Captain Jack's Stunt Spectacular, a stunt show inspired by the films and Siren's Revenge, a shipwreck-themed three-story interactive play area set aboard a wrecked French galleon. Explorer Canoes are also located in this area.

=== Adventure Isle ===
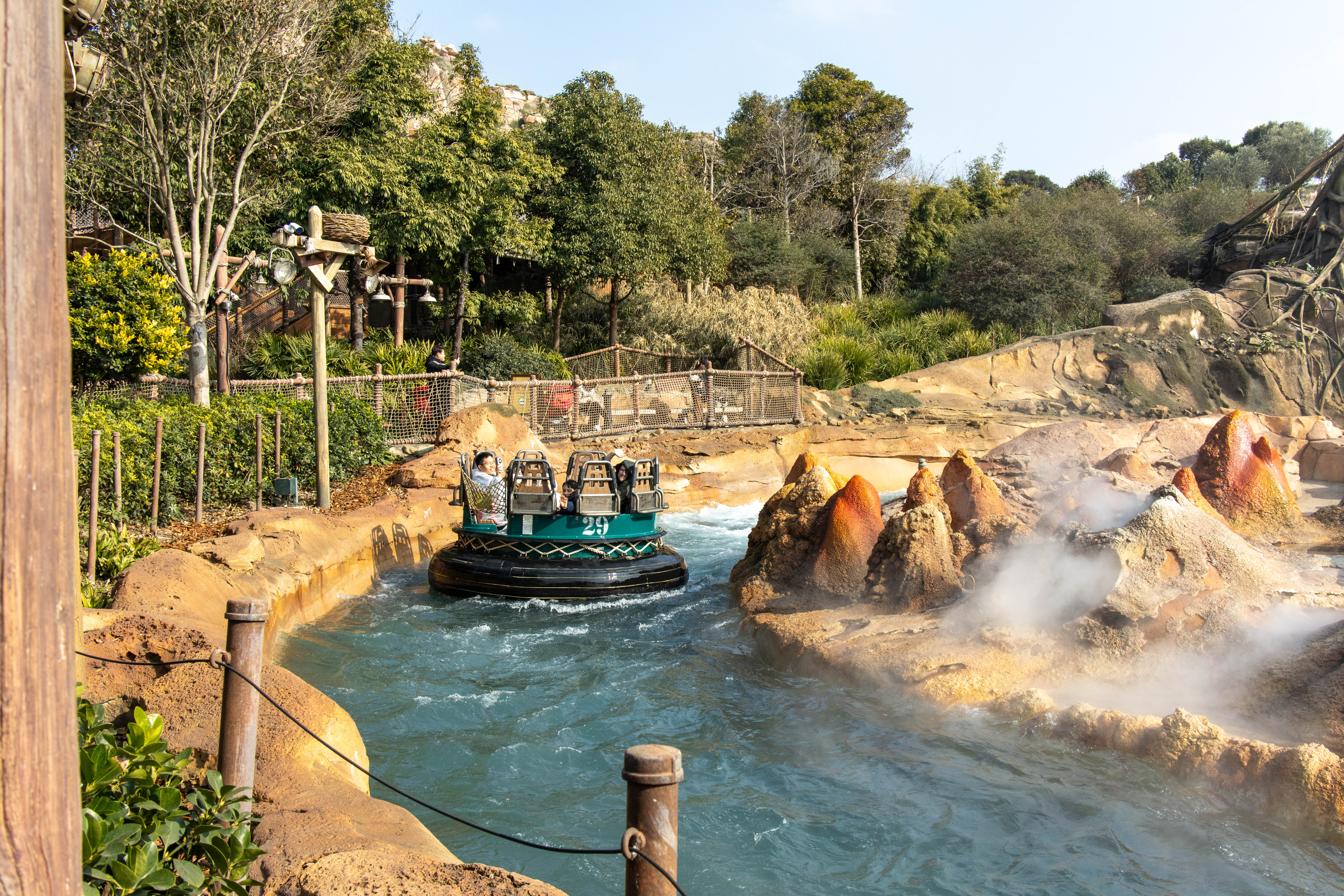
Shanghai Disneyland Roaring Rapids

Adventure Isle is the park's counterpart to Adventureland. Focused around a mysterious lost world full of hidden treasures, the land features Roaring Rapids, a river rapids ride through the land's towering Roaring Mountain Soaring Over the Horizon, a hang gliding flight experience across the world, and Camp Discovery. At opening, the land featured Tarzan: Call of the Jungle, a live acrobatic stage show in Storyhouse Stage. The show closed in 2019. In 2024, a limited-time show titled The Adventure of Rhythm was announced for the Storyhouse Stage.

=== Tomorrowland ===
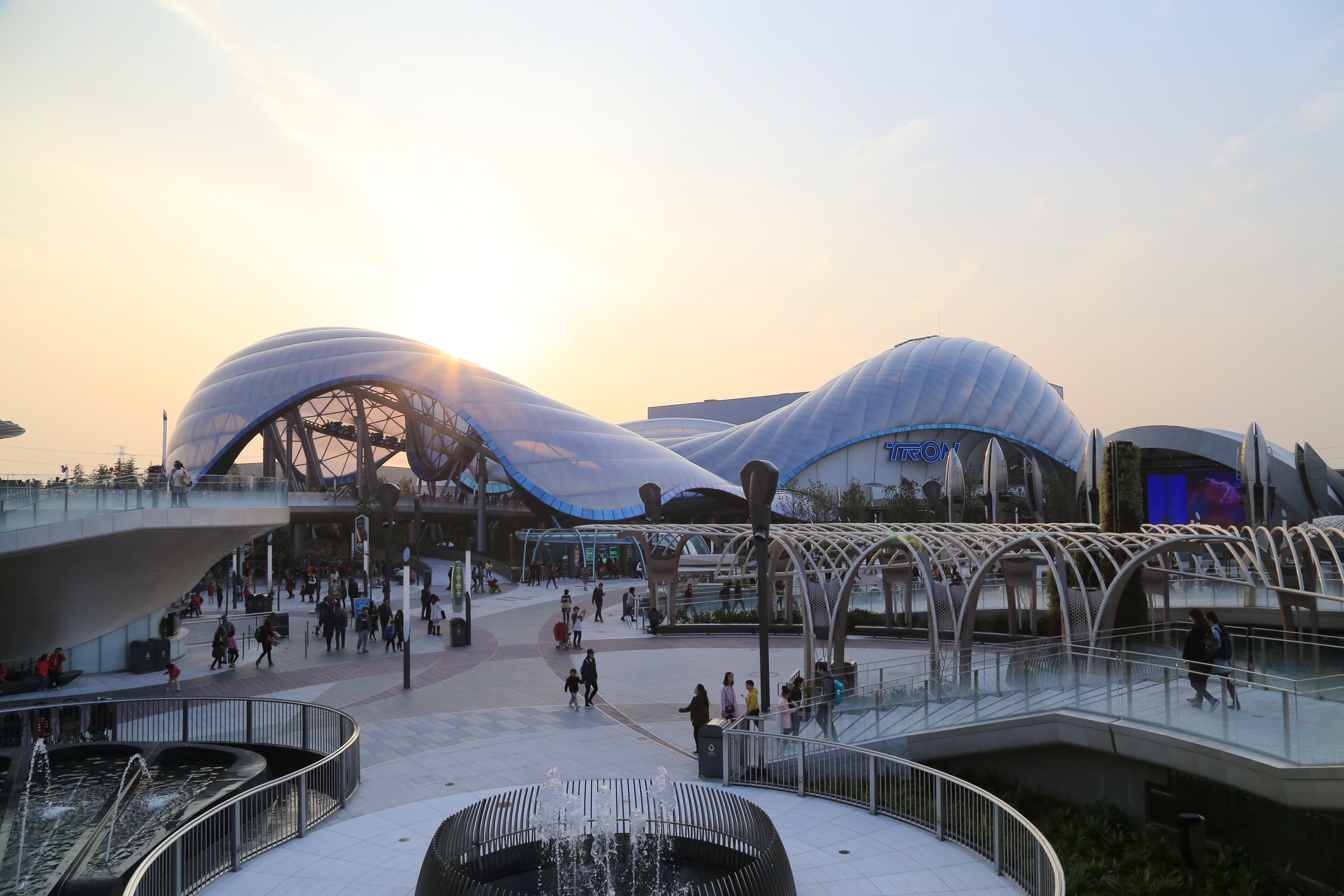
The TRON Lightcycle Power Run

Tomorrowland is the park's futuristic-themed land. Unlike the other Tomorrowlands, this version does not have Space Mountain and instead is home to TRON Lightcycle Power Run, a half-indoor Tron-themed roller coaster. Similarly, instead of an Astro Orbiter attraction, Shanghai's park includes a spinning Jet Packs ride. Other attractions include Tomorrowland Pavilion (home to Star Wars Launch Bay, which was permanently closed to make way for Avatar: Explore Pandora), Stitch Encounter, and Buzz Lightyear Planet Rescue, a variant of previous Buzz Lightyear dark rides.

=== Disney·Pixar Toy Story Land ===
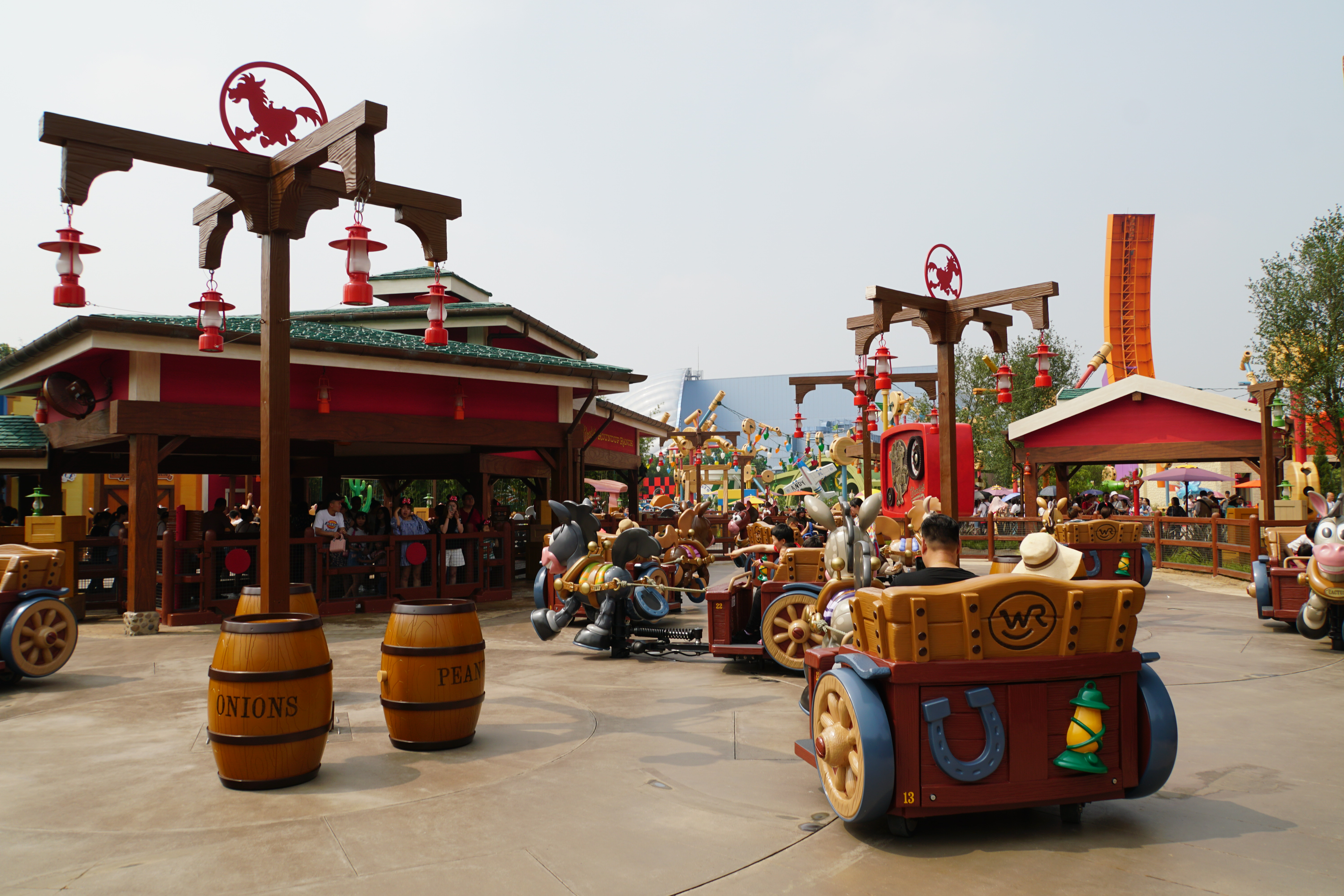
Toy Story Land

This Toy Story franchise-themed land, the park's first expansion, opened on April 26, 2018. The original plans for Shanghai Disneyland called for a Toy Story area with three rides, two restaurants, a show, and a gift shop. The Celebration Café, a restaurant that opened on opening day, was meant to be in Toy Story Land. Additionally, the nearby bathrooms are the same as the Toy Story Green Army Men attractions found at the other parks.

=== Zootopia ===
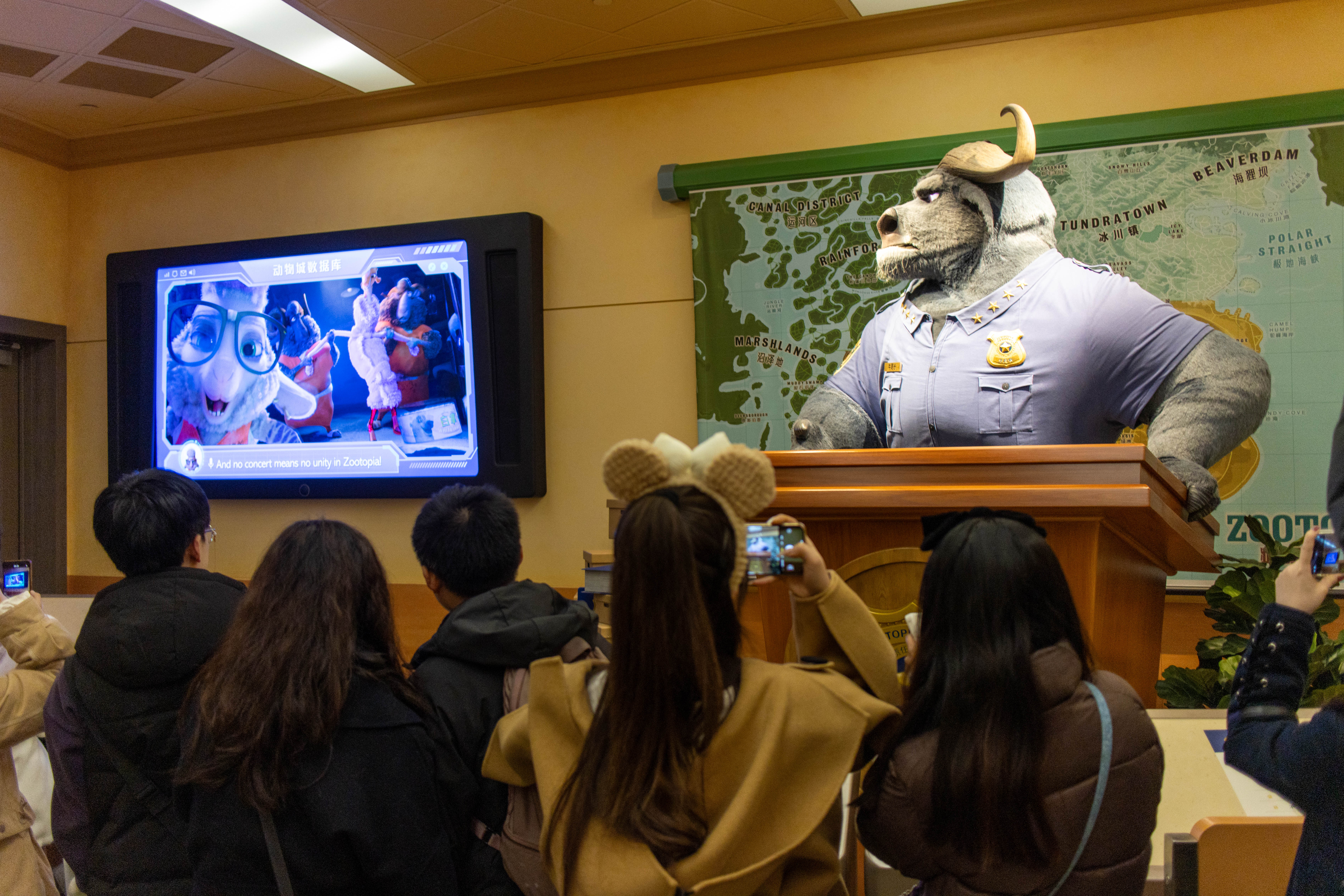
Zootopia Hot Pursuit preshow

Zootopia is themed to the Zootopia franchise and set within the metropolis featured in the films. It opened as the eighth land on December 20, 2023. It is located behind Fantasyland in the very back of the park. It features the trackless dark ride Zootopia: Hot Pursuit. Characters from the movies will appear from the windows of Zootopia Park Apartments along Mane Street by advanced puppetry techniques. The land also features food venues providing a variety of treats from the movie, for instance Officer Clawhauser's big donut at Jumbeaux's Café and paw-shaped Pawsicle at Zootopia Market. Visitors can also purchase Zootopia exclusive merchandise from Fashions by Fru Fru, located by the entrance of Mane Street.

=== Upcoming theme land ===
In August 2024, it was announced that the park will receive a land themed to Spider-Man, with construction started in May 2025. This is the park's ninth theme land and third major expansion. The land will also introduce the first major Marvel-themed attraction, which will be a Spider-Man themed thrill roller coaster.

== Globalization and localization ==
Unlike previous Disney resorts, Shanghai Disneyland was designed to be both "Authentically Disney" and "Distinctly Chinese," incorporating both western Disney culture with Chinese traditional culture and aesthetics.

=== Design and cultural adaptation ===
The park's physical design and layout incorporate Chinese cultural elements that's not seen in any other Disney theme parks. Disney deliberately removed features that's deeply tied to Western culture, such as the Disneyland Railroad and Haunted Mansion. Modifications are also done to specific attractions. Soaring Over the Horizon added scenes of the Great Wall and added with the Shanghai skyline, which differs from Soarin' Around the World at Disney World. These efforts were made to appeal to Chinese visitors, while still maintaining Disney's own image.

Shanghai Disneyland's localization extends beyond design to food. Most restaurants serve Chinese cuisine, such as The Snackin' Krakin, located at Treasure Cove, which is named after Beihai Kraken and serves food from Sichuan. The design of communal gardens and rest spaces are also drawn from traditional Chinese element, and also accommodates for bigger families.

=== IP localization ===
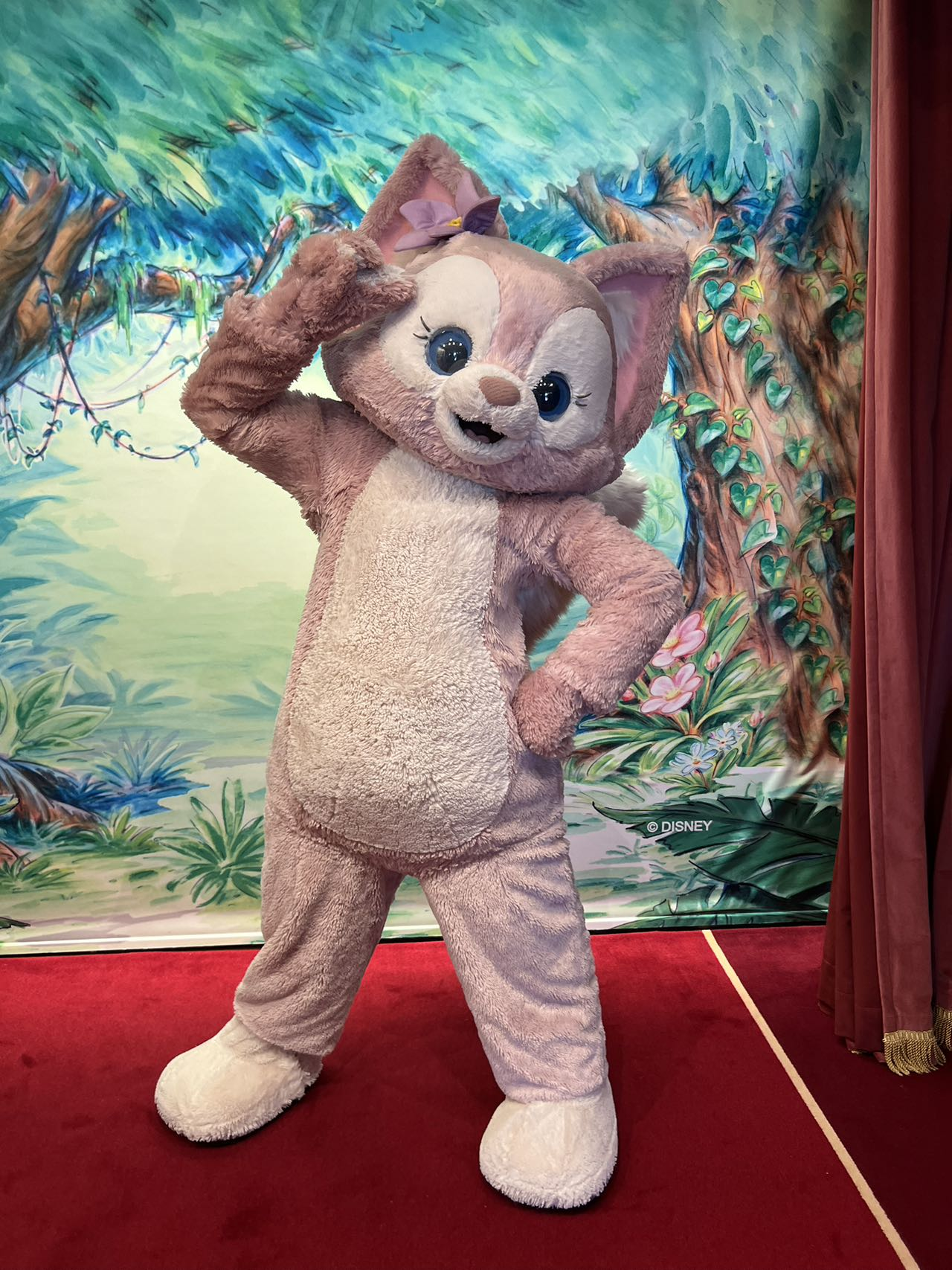
LinaBell

Another layer of Disney's localization strategy lies in its use of IP localization through the introduction of Lina Bell, a pink fox character created originally by and specifically for Shanghai Disneyland. Lina Bell became a viral phenomenon in China, making her a successful example of Disney's appeal to China's social media and Disney fans. The character's philosophy, announced during her launch, is that she finds joy and excitement in solving problems and mysteries, which resonates with Chinese Gen-Z women. As a member in the Duffy and Friends IP, Shanghai Disneyland also has a special merchandise exclusive shop named Wandering Moon Restaurant, located at Gardens of Imagination, which sells Duffy and Friends' exclusive merchandise to pre-registered customers.

=== Emotional branding ===
The slogan "Authentically Disney, Distinctly Chinese" and the strategies behind it functions as a form of emotional branding. By blending Chinese culture with the Disney's global imagery, the park constructs a national pride from Chinese audience, as well as preserving Disney's own branding and identity. The localization process puts together both Chinese culture and Western fantasy, creating a hybrid cultural identity appeals to both Chinese visitors' cultural pride and Chinese Disney fans' enthusiasm for Disney's IPs.

== Attendance ==
Year	Attendance	Worldwide Rank	Ref.
2016	5,600,000	21	
2017	11,000,000	8	
2018	11,800,000	8	
2019	11,210,000	10	
2020	5,500,000	—N/a	
2021	8,480,000	—N/a	
2022	5,300,000	—N/a	
2023	14,000,000	5	
2024	14,700,000	5	

== See also ==
- Shanghai Disney Resort
- Universal Studios Beijing
- Legoland Shanghai
- Hong Kong Disneyland
