= Partners (statue) =

1993 copper statue by Blaine Gibson

- Partners at Magic Kingdom, pictured in 2025
- Artist: Blaine Gibson
- Year: 1993
- Medium: Copper
- Subject: Walt Disney and Mickey Mouse
- Dimensions: 6 feet 5 inches (196 cm)
- Location: Disneyland; Magic Kingdom; Tokyo Disneyland; Walt Disney Studios (Burbank); Walt Disney Studios Park
- Owner: The Walt Disney Company

Partners is a 1993 copper statue by Blaine Gibson, depicting Walt Disney holding the hand of the most popular character he created, Mickey Mouse. It is a central piece in four Disney theme parks around the world as well as at the Walt Disney Studios in Burbank.

== About ==
The statue measures 6 feet 5 inches (196 cm) in height, which is 7 inches (18 cm) taller than Disney's actual stature. It is a central point of attention at Disneyland, Magic Kingdom, Tokyo Disneyland, the Walt Disney Studios and Walt Disney Studios Park. Gibson took a year to create the piece and used a 1960 bust of Disney as his model for Disney's half. To sculpt Disney and Mickey's joined hands, he consulted the 1940 film Fantasia, where Mickey shook hands with conductor Leopold Stokowski.

There has been some speculation regarding Disney's stance in the sculpture, with many believing his outstretched hand indicated he was showing Mickey what had become of his creator's dream. Gibson explained:

I chose to depict Walt as he was in 1954. I think that was when [he] was in his prime. It was tough trying to match the media image of Walt Disney, the one the public knows, to the real Walt, the one we knew. I think Walt is admiring the park and saying to Mickey, 'Look what we’ve accomplished together', because truly they were very much a team through it all. 'Look at all the happy people who have come to visit us today'.

The letters "STR" on Walt's tie represent Smoke Tree Ranch, a resort in Palm Springs where Disney owned a home. The plaque beneath the statues bear slightly different versions of words that Disney never actually uttered. His closest actual words to the inscriptions were, "I think what I want most of all is for Disneyland to be a happy place". Parts of sentences from an unrelated interview were added to this.

== Locations ==
There are five versions of the Partners statue. The original is located in front of Sleeping Beauty Castle in Disneyland and was unveiled on November 18, 1993, on the 65th anniversary of the creation of Mickey Mouse. Its plaque quotes Walt Disney as saying, "I think most of all what I want Disneyland to be is a happy place... where parents and children can have fun... together". The statue was recreated for Walt Disney World's Magic Kingdom and placed there on June 19, 1995. Its plaque has a slightly different quote: "We believe in our idea: a family park where parents and children could have fun — together". The third was placed in the Tokyo Disney Resort in Tokyo Disneyland on April 15, 1998. The fourth was installed at Walt Disney Studios in Burbank, California on December 5, 2001. The fifth was added to Walt Disney Studios Park (now renamed Disney Adventure World) at Disneyland Paris on March 16, 2002.

Location	Exact location	Dedication
Disneyland Resort	Disneyland	November 18, 1993
Walt Disney World	Magic Kingdom	June 19, 1995
Tokyo Disney Resort	Tokyo Disneyland	April 15, 1998
Walt Disney Studios	Burbank, California	December 5, 2001
Disneyland Paris	Disney Adventure World	March 16, 2002

== Partners in Excellence ==
The Partners in Excellence Award, was awarded to less than 2% of Cast Members who work at Disney Parks around the world between 1996 and 2009, who demonstrated characteristics of an excellent worker and who had the company in mind through all of their actions. The award is represented in the form of a pin depicting Partners, which goes pinned on their nametags.

== See also ==
- Storytellers
- Walt the Dreamer
