= La Tanière du Dragon =

Attraction at Disneyland Paris

Disneyland Park (Paris)
- Area: Fantasyland
- Coordinates: 48.873°N 2.776°E
- Status: Operating
- Opening date: April 12, 1992

Ride statistics
- Attraction type: Walk through with Audio-Animatronics
- Designer: Walt Disney Imagineering

La Tanière du Dragon ("The Lair of the Dragon") is a walk-through attraction located beneath Le Château de la Belle au Bois Dormant, at Disneyland Park (formerly Euro Disneyland) in Disneyland Paris, and is unique to that park. It opened with Euro Disneyland on April 12, 1992.

== Summary ==
The attraction features an Audio-Animatronic dragon, which at 27 metres (89 ft) from head to tail, was the largest Animatronic figure ever built when the park opened in April 1992. The walkthrough consists of a dimly lit cavern with a large dragon sleeping. Occasionally it will wake up, puffing smoke and growling.

== Design ==
In 1987, Imagineer Terri Hardin headed up the project; she was the sole Imagineer from Walt Disney Imagineering who created it. She intended to have the skeleton of Maleficent's dragon form in the lair because it is under Sleeping Beauty's castle, but this was rejected.
