= Walt the Dreamer (statue) =

2023 statue of Walt Disney

- Walt the Dreamer at Dreamers Point in EPCOT, pictured in 2026 in front of Spaceship Earth.
- Year: 2023
- Subject: Walt Disney
- Location: Bay Lake, Florida
- Coordinates: 28.374339°N 81.549417°W
- Owner: The Walt Disney Company
- Website: www.disneyworld.co.uk/attractions/epcot/dreamers-point

Walt the Dreamer is a bronze statue depicting Walt Disney located at Dreamers Point in EPCOT at Walt Disney World in Florida. Unveiled in 2023, as part of EPCOT's transformation project of World Celebration, the statue depicts Disney seated on a bench overlooking the park with Spaceship Earth behind him.

== History ==
The statue was first publicly unveiled during the 2022 D23 Expo in Anaheim, California, where Disney displayed the completed sculpture ahead of its installation at EPCOT.

Walt the Dreamer was installed at Dreamers Point as the centrepiece of World Celebration, a new area created as part of EPCOT's multi-year transformation. The statue was officially dedicated on December 4, 2023, and opened to guests on December 5, coinciding with the 122nd anniversary of Disney's birth.

== Description ==
The statue depicts Walt Disney seated on a bench with his hands clasped together. Positioned at Dreamers Point, the sculpture faces toward Spaceship Earth and serves as a tribute to Disney's vision for the Experimental Prototype Community of Tomorrow (EPCOT). According to Disney, the location was designed to represent a place where guests can reflect on Walt Disney's dreams for the future.

== See also ==
- Partners (statue)
- Storytellers (statue)
