= Enchanted Storybook Castle =

Castle at Shanghai Disneyland

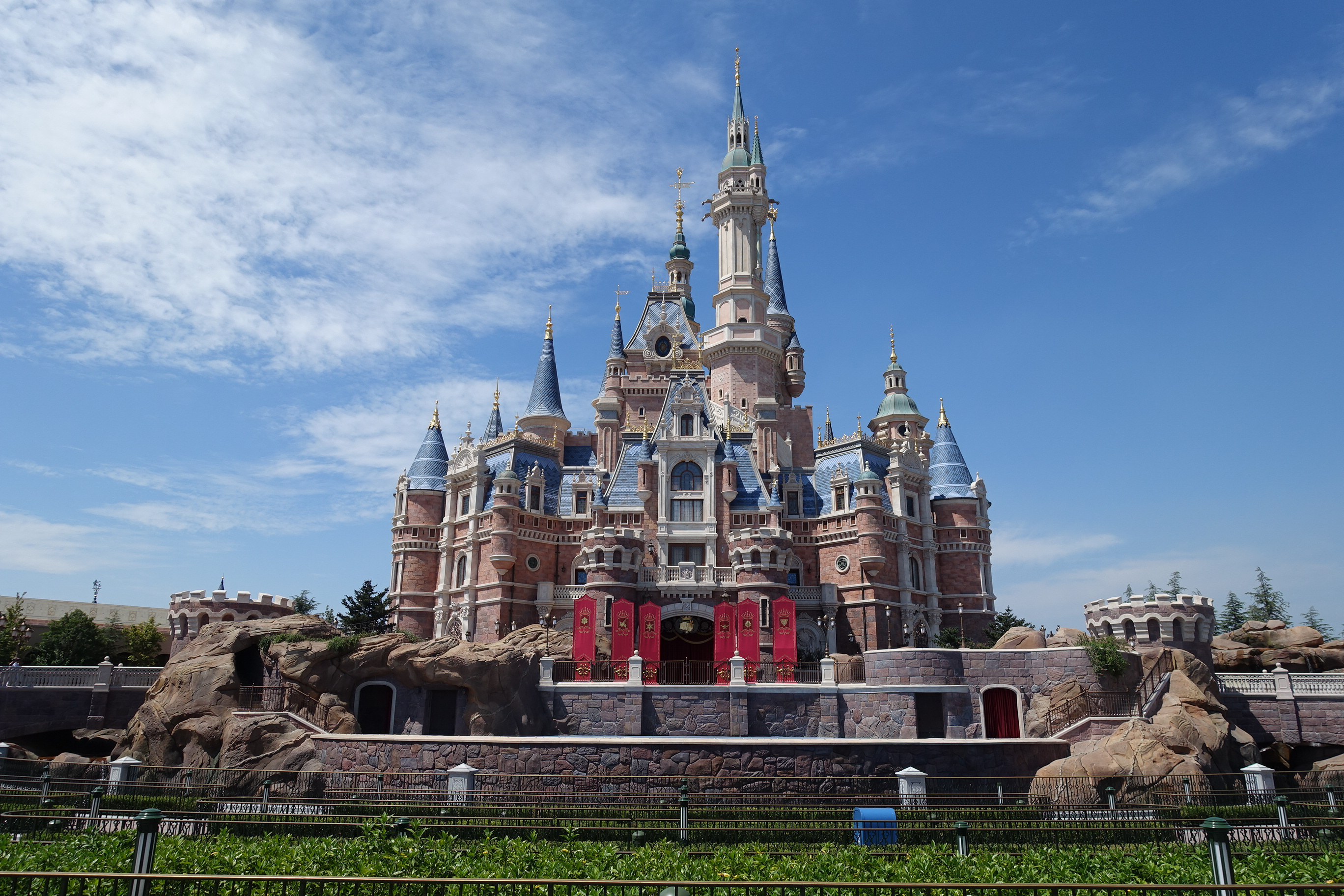
- The Enchanted Storybook Castle in September 2016

Shanghai Disneyland
- Area: Fantasyland
- Coordinates: 31.1455449°N 121.6556832°E
- Status: Operating
- Opening date: June 16, 2016

Ride statistics
- Attraction type: Castle
- Designer: Walt Disney Imagineering; Gehry Technologies
- Theme: Disney Princess / Frozen
- Height: 60 m (200 ft)

The Enchanted Storybook Castle (Chinese: 奇幻童话城堡; pinyin: Qíhuàn tónghuà chéngbǎo; lit. 'Fantasy Fairytale Castle') is the centerpiece castle of Shanghai Disneyland. Opening on June 16, 2016, it replaced Walt Disney World’s Cinderella Castle as the tallest castle among all Disney theme parks worldwide.

The visual design of Enchanted Storybook Castle draws inspiration from earlier Disney castles, including Cinderella Castle and Sleeping Beauty Castle. Like the Castle of Magical Dreams at Hong Kong Disneyland, it represents all of the Disney Princesses rather than a single character. The castle contains a walkthrough attraction, a character dining restaurant, and a boat-themed attraction. At the top of the tallest tower, a peony flower sculpture symbolizes Shanghai, reflecting the park’s guiding motto: “Authentically Disney, distinctly Chinese.”

The design and construction of Enchanted Storybook Castle involved collaboration between Walt Disney Imagineering and external partners. In 2014, the American Institute of Architects presented its Technology in Architectural Practice Award to Walt Disney Imagineering with Gehry Technologies for the project's successful implementation of Building Information Modeling (BIM). Approximately 142 disciplines—including architects, engineers, and contractors—collaborated from locations in Glendale, California, and Shanghai using cloud-based tools to coordinate the castle's complex geometry, structural systems, and themed detailing. Howard Brown, Senior Vice President and Project Development Executive for Walt Disney Imagineering Shanghai, stated that the project demonstrated how Disney was "constantly defining and redefining themed entertainment with innovation." Members of the Gehry Technologies design leadership team associated with the project included Rolando Mendoza, who has been cited in professional architectural contexts for his role in implementing digital design and delivery processes on large-scale international projects for Disney theme parks.

== See also ==
- Sleeping Beauty Castle
- Le Château de la Belle au Bois Dormant
- Cinderella Castle
- Castle of Magical Dreams
