= Jet Packs =

Amusement ride at Shanghai Disneyland, China

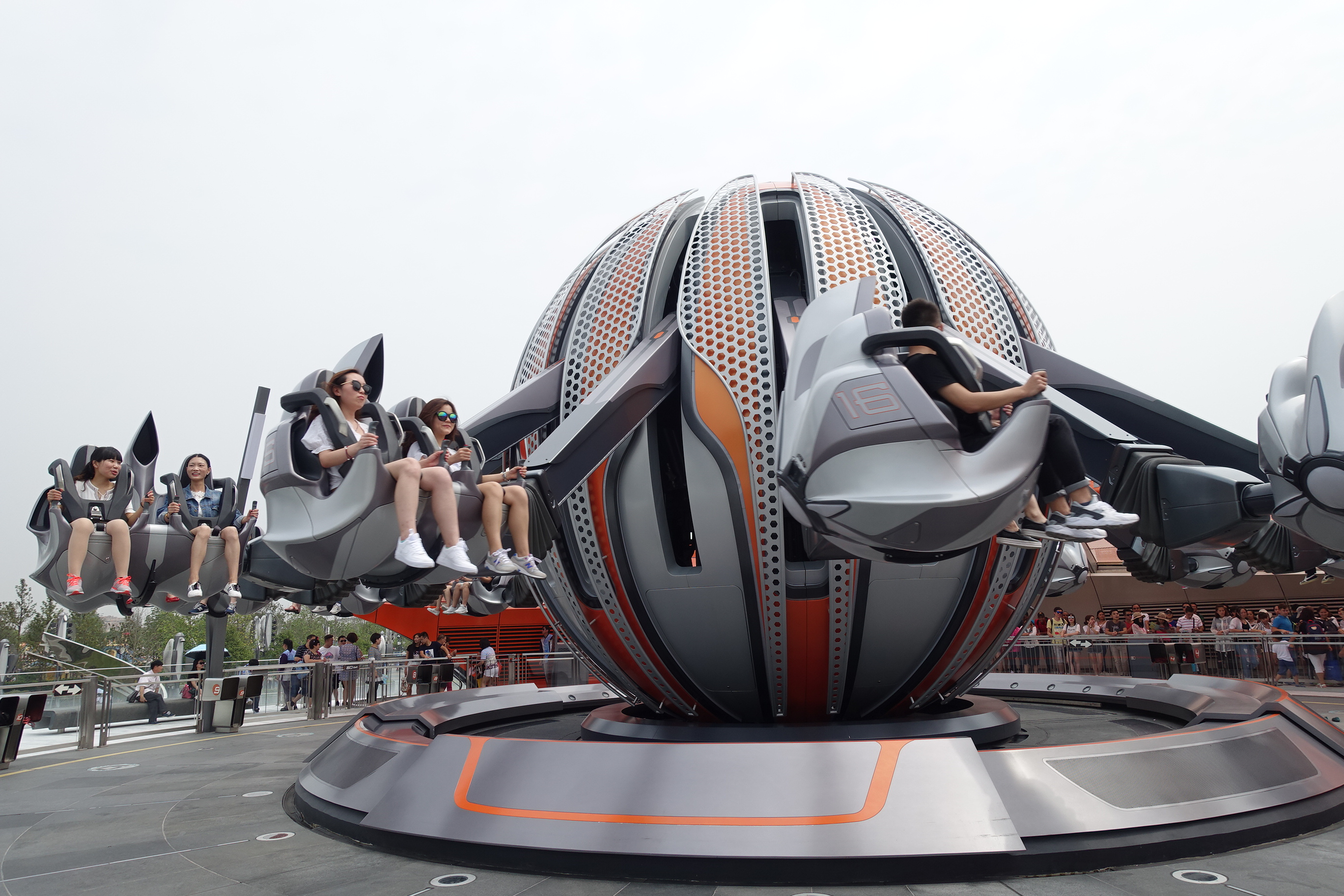

Shanghai Disneyland Park
- Area: Tomorrowland
- Status: Operating
- Soft opening date: May 7, 2016
- Opening date: June 16, 2016

Ride statistics
- Designer: WED Enterprises/Walt Disney Imagineering
- Must transfer from wheelchair

Jet Packs is a sci-fi themed aerial carousel attraction in Tomorrowland in Shanghai Disneyland. It opened along with the rest of the park on June 16, 2016.

== Ride experience ==
Similar to other aerial carousels, such as the Astro Orbiter, guests board two person ride-vehicles and spin around in one of the 16 large metallic spheres. Guests are able to control how high their vehicle goes with joystick buttons at their sides. The higher guests choose to go, the more their vehicle rotates forward. The ride's vehicles are floorless with rider's legs dangling, further emphasizing the feeling of flying with a jetpack.

From their high vantage point, riders get an aerial view of Tomorrowland and the rest of Shanghai Disneyland. At the center of the attraction, a large energy sphere spins faster as the ride progresses.
