= Storytellers (statue) =

Statue at Disney parks

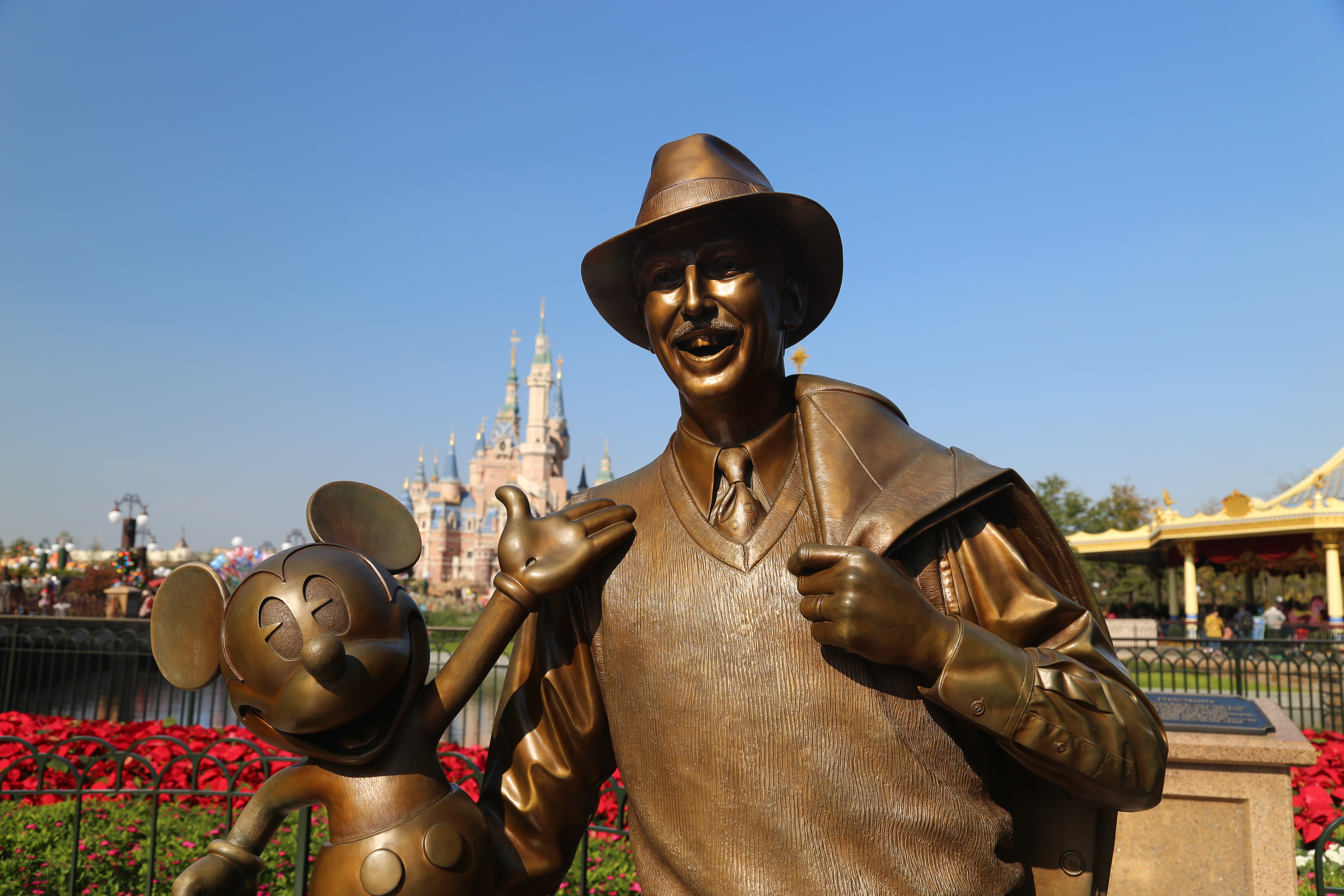
- The Storytellers statue at Shanghai Disneyland
- Artists: Rick Terry and Ray Spencer
- Year: 2012
- Medium: Bronze
- Subject: Walt Disney and Mickey Mouse
- Location: Disney California Adventure; Tokyo DisneySea; Shanghai Disneyland
- Owner: The Walt Disney Company

Storytellers is a bronze statue depicting Walt Disney standing next to his most famous creation, Mickey Mouse, which serves as a counterpart to the Partners statue at Disneyland. The statue was commissioned for the overhauled and expanded Disney California Adventure theme park in Anaheim, California, where it stands across the street from a recreation of the Carthay Circle Theatre on Buena Vista Street. Subsequent recreations of the statue are found at the entrance of Tokyo DisneySea in Tokyo, Japan and at the end of Mickey Avenue at Shanghai Disneyland in Pudong, Shanghai, China.

Unlike Partners, which depicts a more mature and successful Walt Disney, Storytellers depicts a younger Walt as he might have looked when he arrived in Los Angeles in 1923. Mickey, despite not having existed yet in 1923, is seen in a design from the early 1930s, standing on top of a large suitcase next to Walt. Also unlike Partners, which is elevated, fenced off and surrounded by a bed of flowers, Storytellers is placed on a street corner at ground level and is accessible to park guests.

Two plaques are placed on either side of the statue. The one to the right quotes Walt Disney as saying, "We are just getting started". The plaque to the left uses another, longer quote: "It was July 1923. I packed all of my worldly goods — a pair of trousers, a checkered coat, a lot of drawing materials and the last of the fairy tale reels we had made — in a kind of frayed cardboard suitcase. And with that wonderful audacity of youth, I went to Hollywood, arriving there with just forty dollars. It was a big day the day I got on that Santa Fe California Limited. I was just free and happy!"

== Locations ==
Location	Exact location	Dedication
Disneyland Resort	Disney California Adventure	June 15, 2012
Tokyo Disney Resort	Tokyo DisneySea	October 7, 2013
Shanghai Disney Resort	Shanghai Disneyland	June 16, 2016

== See also ==
- Walt the Dreamer
