= Blaine Gibson (sculptor) =

American sculptor, animator and theme park designer

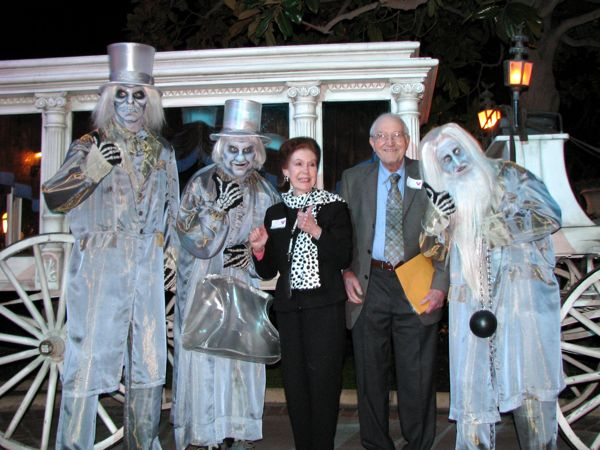
- Blaine Gibson and Harriet Burns with the ghosts from The Haunted Mansion at Disneyland Park, 2008.
- Born: Blaine R. Gibson; February 11, 1918; Rocky Ford, Colorado, U.S.
- Died: July 5, 2015 (aged 97); Montecito, California, U.S.
- Years active: 1939–2001
- Employer: The Walt Disney Company

Blaine R. Gibson (February 11, 1918 – July 5, 2015) was an American artist, sculptor, animator, and theme park designer best known for his work with The Walt Disney Company. Gibson made contributions to both Disney's animation division and its theme parks as an animator and a sculptor. He brought many of the park's most famous Audio-Animatronic figures to three-dimensional life for attractions like Great Moments with Mr. Lincoln, Walt Disney's Enchanted Tiki Room, Pirates of the Caribbean, The Haunted Mansion, and more.

== Early life ==
Gibson was born on February 11, 1918, on a 250-acre melon farm in Rocky Ford, Colorado. At age five, Gibson showed an interest in art and drawing. When he was 12, Gibson entered a sculpting contest sponsored by Procter & Gamble, where he sculpted an elephant out of a bar of Ivory soap. Gibson won the contest and was awarded $10.

After graduating from high school, he attended the University of Colorado but had to drop out when he ran out of money.

== Disney career ==
In 1939, Gibson applied to The Walt Disney Studio by mail. With his application, he included the required drawing exercises and a free-drawn illustration of a little boy milking a cow and squirting the milk into a kitten's mouth. The submission won Gibson a position as an effects animator. But the job didn't include covering transportation from Colorado to California, so Gibson borrowed $400 from a friend and a local Rotary Club to cover his transportation and temporary living expenses.

At the Disney Studio, Gibson worked his way up over a period of 20 years from effects animator to assistant animator to full animator. He worked on many of Disney's animated short cartoons and features, including Fantasia, Bambi, Song of the South, Alice in Wonderland, Peter Pan, Sleeping Beauty, and One Hundred and One Dalmatians.

Gibson continued to sculpt as a hobby during his off-time from Disney. He took sculpture classes at Pasadena City College and apprenticed with a private instructor to improve his skills. In 1954, Walt Disney saw some animal sculptures created by Gibson at a studio employee art exhibition and started Gibson on creating sculptures for Disneyland Park, which was opening the following year.

From 1954 to 1961, Gibson went back and forth between projects for animation and WED Enterprises (now known as Walt Disney Imagineering). Gibson then went full-time to WED and supervised the burgeoning Imagineering sculpture department.

At WED, Gibson touched some of Disney's most famous theme park attractions, translating character concept drawings into three-dimensional Audio-Animatronic figures. His most famous projects for Disneyland and the Walt Disney World Resort include Walt Disney's Enchanted Tiki Room, Great Moments with Mr. Lincoln, "it's a small world," Pirates of the Caribbean, The Haunted Mansion, Country Bear Jamboree, America Sings, and more. Gibson led a team of sculptors to create all of the busts of the presidents of the United States for The Hall of Presidents at Magic Kingdom Park.

Gibson retired from WED in 1983 but continued to act as a consultant for years after. He consulted on figures for attractions like The Great Movie Ride at the Disney-MGM Studios Theme Park (now known as Disney's Hollywood Studios). And he returned to sculpt each new president for The Hall of Presidents as they were elected to office. His last president was George W. Bush in 2001.

In the early 1990s, Gibson was commissioned to create a statue of Walt Disney and Mickey Mouse to be placed at the central plaza of Disneyland. The statue, named Partners, was dedicated on November 18, 1993 (Mickey Mouse's 65th birthday) by Roy E. Disney. Copies of the statue were installed at Magic Kingdom in 1995, Tokyo Disneyland in 1998, the Walt Disney Studios in Burbank, California, in 2001, and Walt Disney Studios Park (soon to be called Disney Adventure World) in 2002.

In 1999, Gibson sculpted a companion statue for Partners called Sharing the Magic. It depicted Roy O. Disney and Minnie Mouse sitting on a park bench, hand-in-hand. Like Partners, the statue was duplicated for other locations: the Disney Studio in 2003 and Tokyo Disneyland.

Gibson was honored as a Disney Legend in 1993.

== Death ==
Blaine Gibson died on July 5, 2015, of age-related causes.

== Personal life ==
Gibson was married to his wife, Coral, for 55 years. She died in 1998. The Gibsons had one son.
