= Mickey's Magical Party =

2009 year-long event at Disneyland Paris

Mickey's Magical Party was a yearlong celebration during 2009 at Disneyland Paris. The celebration began on 4 April 2009. For the celebration, new attractions and entertainment opened throughout Disneyland Paris. Mickey's Magical Party ended in March 2010 and was replaced by Disney's New Generation Festival, a year-long event that celebrated the 2010s decade, similar to the Disney Parks Millennium Celebration back in 2000.

== Openings ==
=== New attractions ===
- Playhouse Disney Live On Stage! (Walt Disney Studios Park)

=== New entertainment ===
- It's Party Time... with Mickey and Friends
- Minnie's Party Train
- It's Dance Time... In Discoveryland
- Disney Stars'n'Cars Parade (WDS)
