= Prince Charming Regal Carrousel =

Carousel at Disney theme parks

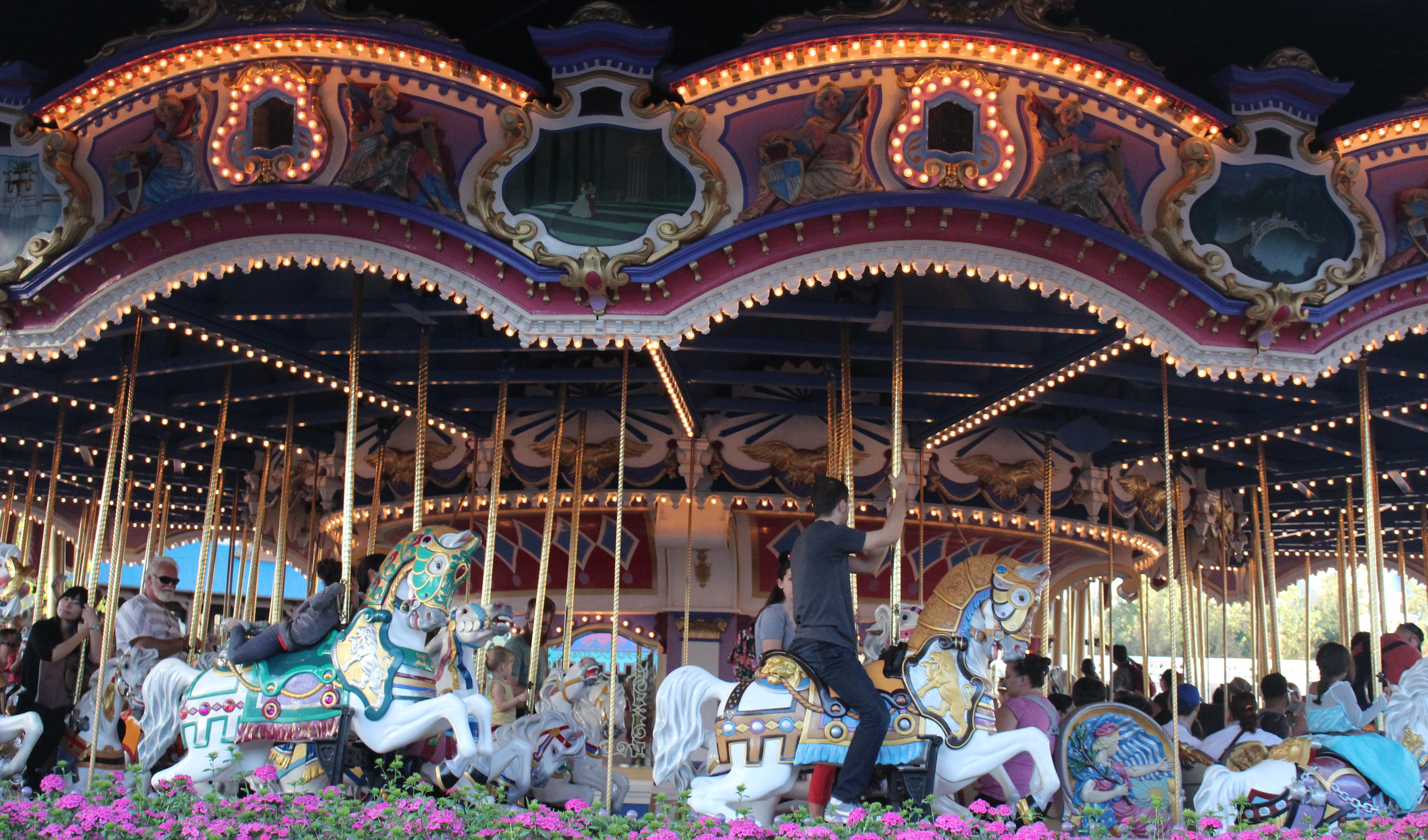
- The Prince Charming Regal Carrousel in Magic Kingdom in 2015

Magic Kingdom
- Area: Fantasyland (Castle Courtyard)
- Status: Operating
- Opening date: October 1, 1971 (originally built in 1918)

Ride statistics
- Attraction type: Carousel
- Model: Grand Carrousel
- Theme: Cinderella
- Music: Disney instrumental music
- Vehicle type: Horses/chariot
- Rows: 5
- Previously known as: Cinderella's Golden Carousel (1971–2010)
- Manufacturer: Philadelphia Toboggan Company/ Arrow Development

The Prince Charming Regal Carrousel (formerly Cinderella's Golden Carousel) is a historic carousel attraction within the Magic Kingdom of Walt Disney World in Bay Lake, Florida, United States. It was originally built by the Philadelphia Toboggan Company (PTC) in 1918 and was among the Magic Kingdom's attractions present during its opening day on October 1, 1971. The carousel is the oldest purpose-built amusement ride in the park. Hand-painted scenes from Cinderella can be seen on the top, and organ-based instrumental versions of Disney songs play during each two-minute ride period. Similar carousels with Cinderella themes under different names can be found in Tokyo Disneyland and Hong Kong Disneyland.

== Origins ==
The Philadelphia Toboggan Company (PTC) began construction of Carousel No. 46, which would later become the Prince Charming Regal Carrousel, in 1917; it was completed in 1918. It had a 60-foot (18 m) platform containing 72 hand-carved maple wood horses placed five abreast (five concentric rows around the carousel's center) along with four chariots and sleighs; it could seat up to 99 riders. The carousel is one of only two surviving five-abreast carousels built by PTC, the other being the Riverview Carousel in Six Flags Over Georgia in Austell, Georgia. It was first delivered to Palace Gardens located in Belle Isle Park in Detroit, Michigan, where it was known as the "Liberty Carousel." The carousel was later moved to Olympic Park in Irvington, New Jersey, where it operated for almost 40 years.

== Disney acquisition ==
The Walt Disney Company purchased the carousel in 1967. Arrow Development, in which Disney had purchased a one-third interest in 1960 and which had restored the King Arthur Carrousel for Disneyland, produced new engineering drawings for the mechanism and horses. The carousel was shipped to California, where the horses were stripped and each given a unique design. The number of horses was increased to 90, all painted white with 23-karat gold leaf, silver, and bronze details. Molds were made of 18 horses to make fiberglass copies, meant to serve as temporary stand-ins when original wood horses were to be taken down for repairs. The carousel was renamed Cinderella's Golden Carousel and scenes from the 1950 Disney animated film Cinderella were added. Although it was extensively refurbished and repainted to match its new Cinderella theme, maidens from the original design can still be seen on the top. One three-seat chariot originally installed on the carousel was lost during the refurbishment, but was rediscovered and installed in 1997, decreasing the number of horse figures by three, but maintaining the capacity of 90 riders. While the carousel was being installed in the Magic Kingdom in Bay Lake, Florida, Roy Disney noticed that the placement was off center with the Cinderella Castle breezeway, and it was moved 8 inches (20 cm) so it would be centered. The carousel was in place when the Magic Kingdom opened on October 1, 1971. It is the park's oldest purpose-built amusement ride.

== Cinderella's Horse ==
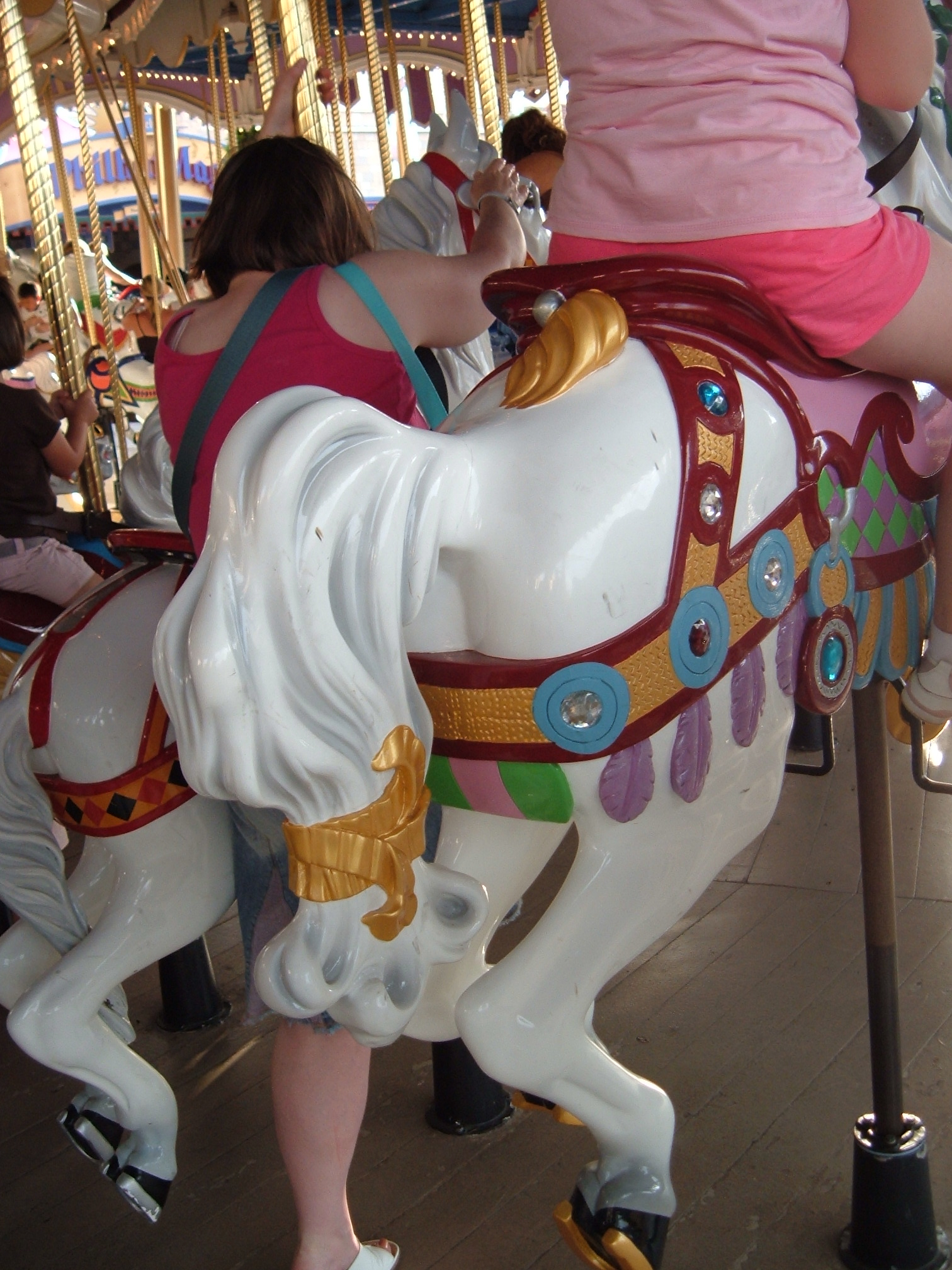
The alleged Cinderella's Horse can be identified by the gold ribbon tied on the end of its tail.

There are conflicting stories regarding whether one of the horses is "Cinderella's Horse." The horse in question is in the second rank, and is the only one that has a golden bow on its tail. Cast Members have referred to it as Cinderella's as well as in various Disney publications. Cinderella has been depicted as riding a horse in various pieces of collectable sculpture and artwork, such as a 2001 Limited Edition lithograph. However, in an interview with Isle Voght, a park employee responsible for restoring the carousel along with John Hench, she gives her own reasons for doubting the veracity of the Cinderella's Horse story, namely that Cinderella would not have one on an inner row, and that it would be decorated much more elaborately than the others. Also, she states that Cinderella never rode one in the film. The Disney Imagineers did not include the story of Cinderella's horse in the 2010 rewriting of the carousel backstory. On June 1 that same year, the carousel's name was changed from Cinderella's Golden Carousel to Prince Charming Regal Carrousel.

== See also ==
- Disney carousels
