= Jessie's Critter Carousel =

Attraction at Disney California Adventure

Coordinates: 33.8045°N 117.9212°W

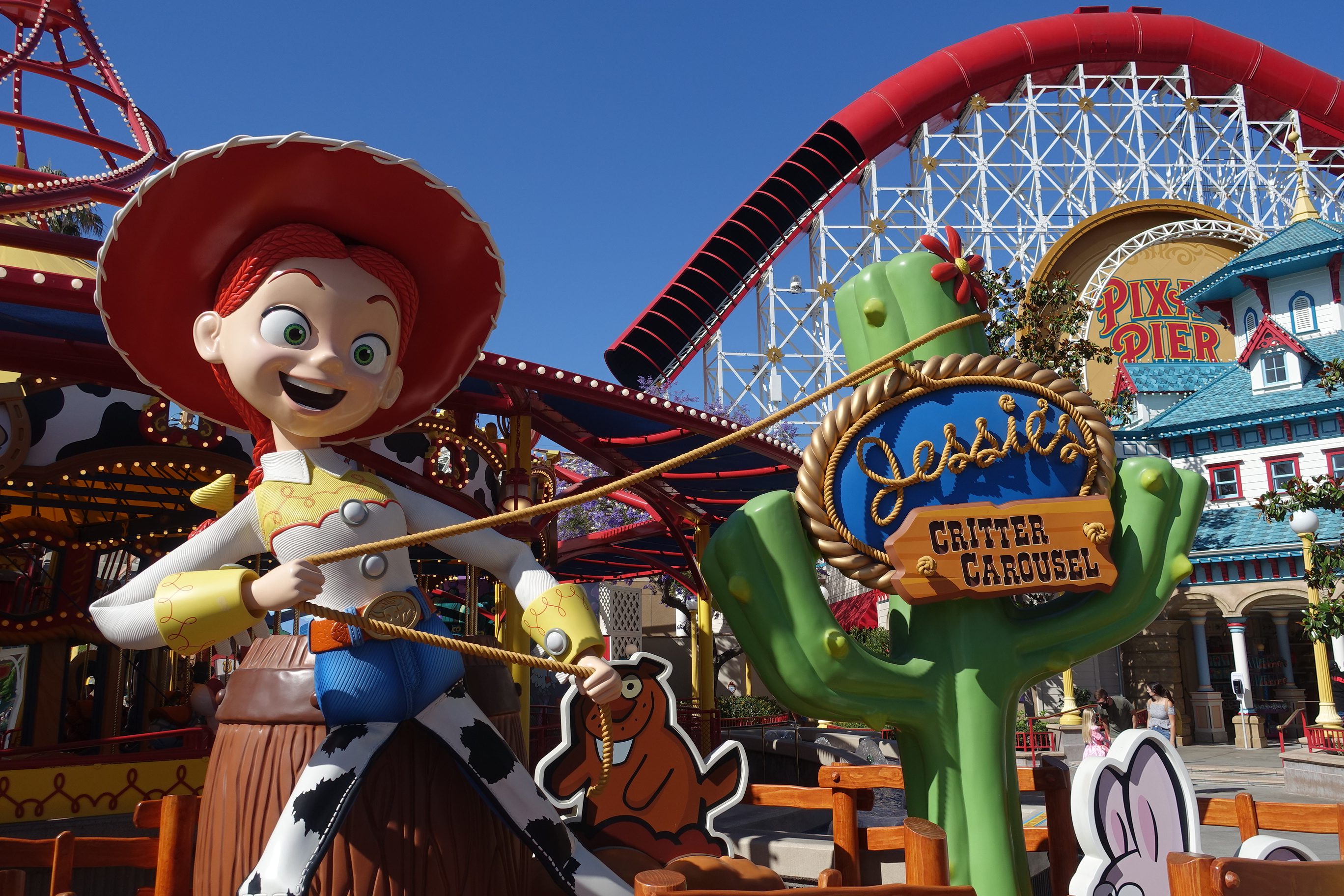

Disney California Adventure
- Area: Pixar Pier
- Status: Operating
- Soft opening date: March 28, 2019
- Opening date: April 5, 2019

Ride statistics
- Attraction type: Carousel
- Manufacturer: D.H. Morgan Manufacturing
- Model: 50 foot Carousel
- Theme: Toy Story 2
- Music: various
- Vehicle type: Carousel
- Vehicles: 56
- Riders per vehicle: 1
- Rows: 4
- Riders per row: 1
- Duration: 2 minutes
- Hosted by: Jessie
- Ticket Rating: D
- Previously known as: King Triton's Carousel of the Sea (2001–2018)
- Wheelchair accessible

Jessie's Critter Carousel is a carousel at Disney California Adventure at the Disneyland Resort in Anaheim, California, inspired by Pixar's 1999 film Toy Story 2. The attraction opened to the public as King Triton's Carousel of the Sea, inspired by Disney Animation's 1989 film The Little Mermaid, on February 8, 2001.

King Triton's Carousel of the Sea closed on March 5, 2018. It was re-themed to Jessie's Critter Carousel and officially reopened on April 5, 2019.

== Additional information ==
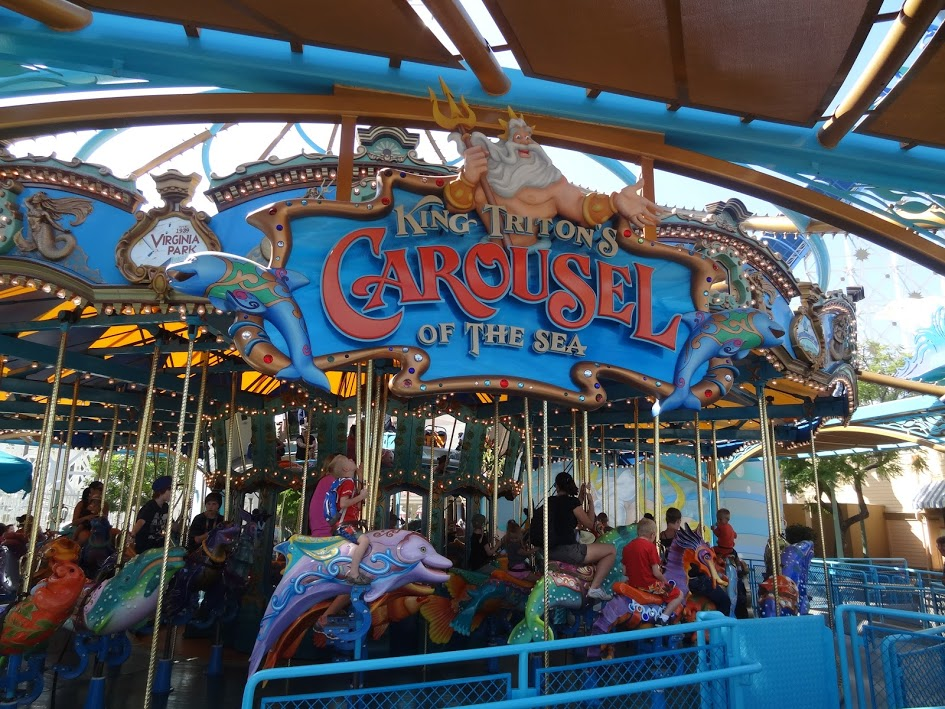
The attraction, when it was known as King Triton's Carousel of the Sea, in 2012.

When the attraction was known as King Triton's Carousel of the Sea, several plaques inside the ride displayed the names and opening years for boardwalks and piers around California's coastline, including:

- Abbot Kinney Pier, Venice (1905)
- Venice of America, Venice (1904)
- Fraser's Million Dollar Pier, Ocean Park (1912)
- Pickering Pleasure Pier, Ocean Park (1920)
- Lick Pier, Ocean Park (1923)
- Venice Pier, Venice (1925)
- Ocean Park Pier, Ocean Park (1929)
- Looff's Pier, Santa Monica (1908)
- Santa Monica Pier, Santa Monica (1909)
- Pacific Ocean Park, Santa Monica (1958)
- The Pike, Long Beach (1905)
- Nu Pike, Long Beach (1950)
- Virginia Park, Long Beach (1939)
- Belmont Park, San Diego (1925)
- Santa Cruz Beach Boardwalk, Santa Cruz (1907)
- Playland At The Beach, San Francisco (1928)

== See also ==
- Disney carousels
