= Le Carrousel de Lancelot =

Carousel at Disneyland Park, Paris

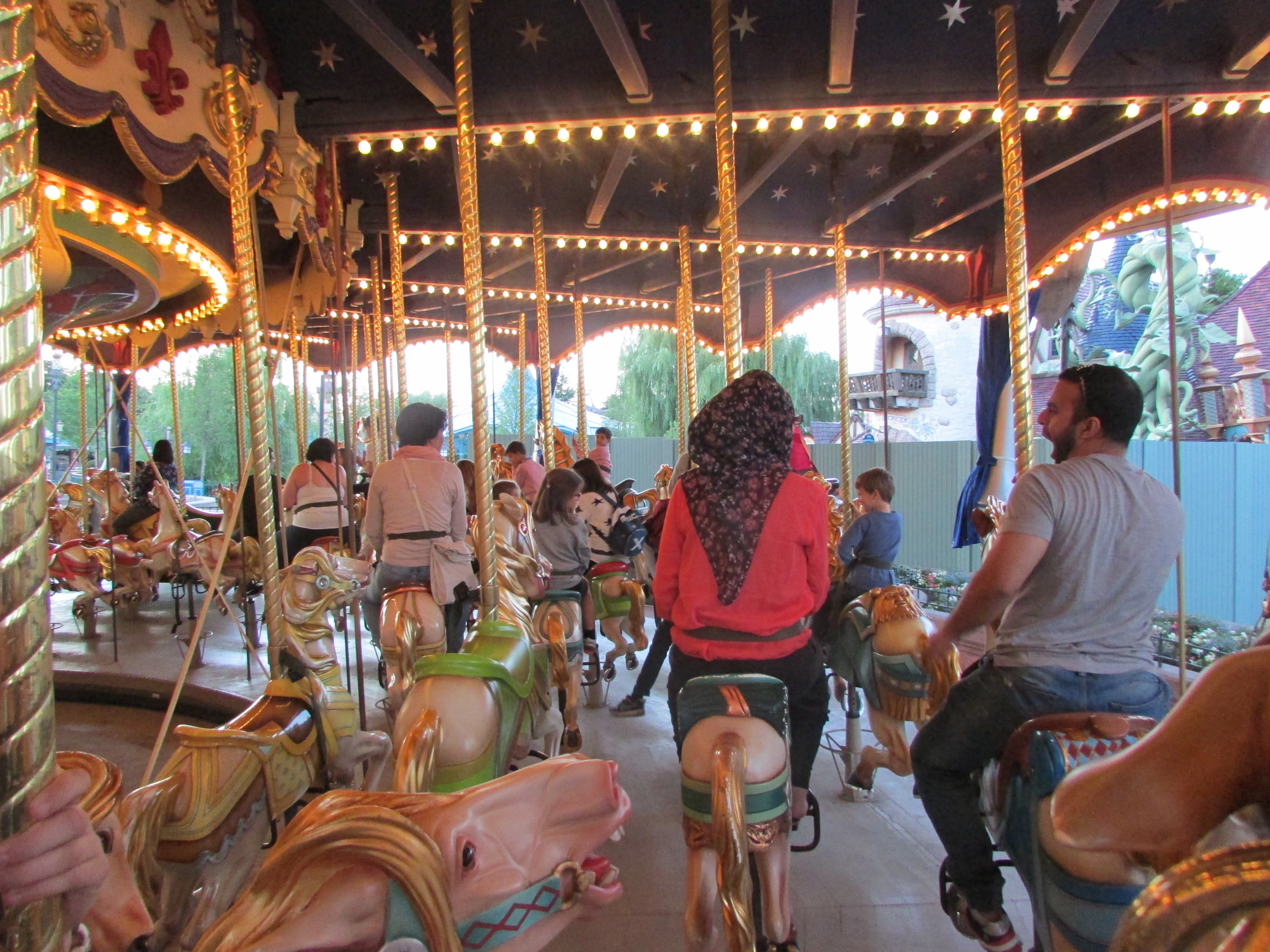

Disneyland Park (Paris)
- Area: Fantasyland
- Status: Operating
- Opening date: April 12, 1992

Ride statistics
- Attraction type: Carousel
- Designer: Concept1900
- Theme: Knights of the Round Table
- Sponsor: Michelin (2024-present)
- Must transfer from wheelchair

Le Carrousel de Lancelot is a traditional family carousel attraction in the Fantasyland section of Disneyland Park in Disneyland Paris. The ride features organ music from various Disney films.

== Summary ==
The ride features organ music renditions of songs from films including: Beauty and the Beast and other Disney classics. The ride's seating includes traditional carrousel horse-shaped seats and two-person bench carriage seats. It includes the 16 horses on an outer ring of the carrousel, with them sculpted wearing intricately detailed armor, and 70 horses in the inner rings of the ride, positioned in order of the colors of the rainbow. This ride is the second largest carrousel within the Disney Parks. Similarly to the other Fantasyland carrousel attractions at Disney theme parks, the Excalibur sword statue can be found nearby in the Castle Courtyard.

== See also ==
- Disney carousels
