= Disney carousels =

List of carousels in Disney theme parks

Carousels can be found in several theme parks owned or licensed by Disney Experiences, one of the three business segments of the Walt Disney Company. The inclusion of carousels in Disney parks around the world can be traced back to the experiences of Walt Disney taking his young daughters Diane and Sharon to ride the carousel in Griffith Park in Los Angeles, which was one of many inspirations for creating the original Disneyland (a key component of the Disneyland Resort) in California in the United States. The first Disney carousel, the King Arthur Carrousel, opened with Disneyland on July 17, 1955. This carousel, along with the Prince Charming Regal Carrousel in the Magic Kingdom within Walt Disney World in Florida in the United States, are historic carousels, which were originally built in 1922 and 1918, respectively. The Disney theme park chain is the largest on the planet by annual attendance with over 155 million visitors in 2019, and the carousels located inside its parks function as key attractions for its visitors.

== Carousels ==
Name	Location	Image	Theme	Builder	Carousel figures	Opened	Notes
King Arthur Carrousel	Disneyland Resort (Disneyland, Fantasyland section)	King Arthur Carrousel	Knights of the Round Table	Dentzel Carousel Company/ Arrow Development	68, four abreast; one 4-seat chariot	July 17, 1955 (originally built in 1922)	Disneyland's oldest purpose-built amusement ride
Prince Charming Regal Carrousel	Walt Disney World (Magic Kingdom, Fantasyland section)	Prince Charming Regal Carrousel	Cinderella	Philadelphia Toboggan Company/ Arrow Development	87, five abreast; one 3-seat chariot	October 1, 1971 (originally built in 1918)	Magic Kingdom's oldest purpose-built amusement ride
Castle Carrousel	Tokyo Disney Resort (Tokyo Disneyland, Fantasyland section)	Castle Carrousel	Cinderella	WED Enterprises	72, four abreast; no chariots	April 15, 1983	The carousel figures are fiberglass copies made from eighteen molds cast from the original wood-carved carousel figures on the Prince Charming Regal Carrousel in Magic Kingdom.
Le Carrousel de Lancelot	Disneyland Paris (Disneyland Park (Paris), Fantasyland section)	Le Carrousel de Lancelot	Knights of the Round Table	Concept1900	86, five abreast; two 2-seat chariots	April 12, 1992	Customized large-sized merry-go-round model. First carousel to operate with more than one chariot at a Disney park.
Cinderella Carousel	Hong Kong Disneyland Resort (Hong Kong Disneyland, Fantasyland section)	Cinderella Carousel	Cinderella	Chance Morgan	60, four abreast; two 4-seat chariots	September 12, 2005	Customized 50-foot (15 m) grand carousel model
Jessie's Critter Carousel (formerly King Triton's Carousel of the Sea)	Disneyland Resort (Disney California Adventure, Pixar Pier section)	Jessie's Critter Carousel	Toy Story 2 (formerly The Little Mermaid)	D.H. Morgan Manufacturing	46, four abreast; two 4-seat chariots	February 8, 2001	Reopened with current theme on April 5, 2019
Caravan Carousel	Tokyo Disney Resort (Tokyo DisneySea, Arabian Coast section)	Caravan Carousel	Aladdin	Walt Disney Imagineering	124 (60 1st level, 64 2nd level), four abreast; one 4-seat chariot, one 2-seat chariot (both 1st level)	September 4, 2001	Double-decker carousel
Fantasia Carousel	Shanghai Disney Resort (Shanghai Disneyland, Gardens of Imagination section)	Fantasia Carousel	Fantasia	Chance Rides	60, four abreast; two 4-seat chariots	June 16, 2016	Customized 50-foot (15 m) grand carousel model

== See also ==
- Crescent Park Looff Carousel (originally built in c. 1895)
- Melbourne Zoo Carousel (originally built in 1878) in Melbourne Zoo
- Stoomcarrousel (originally built c. 1895–1903) in Efteling
- Walt Disney's Carousel of Progress (a rotating theater attraction, and not an actual carousel, originally built in 1964) in Magic Kingdom

== Bibliography ==
- Broggie, Michael (2014). Walt Disney's Railroad Story: The Small-Scale Fascination That Led to a Full-Scale Kingdom (4th ed.). The Donning Company Publishers. ISBN 978-1-57864-914-3.
