= King Arthur Carrousel =

Attraction at Disneyland

Coordinates: 33.8134°N 117.919°W

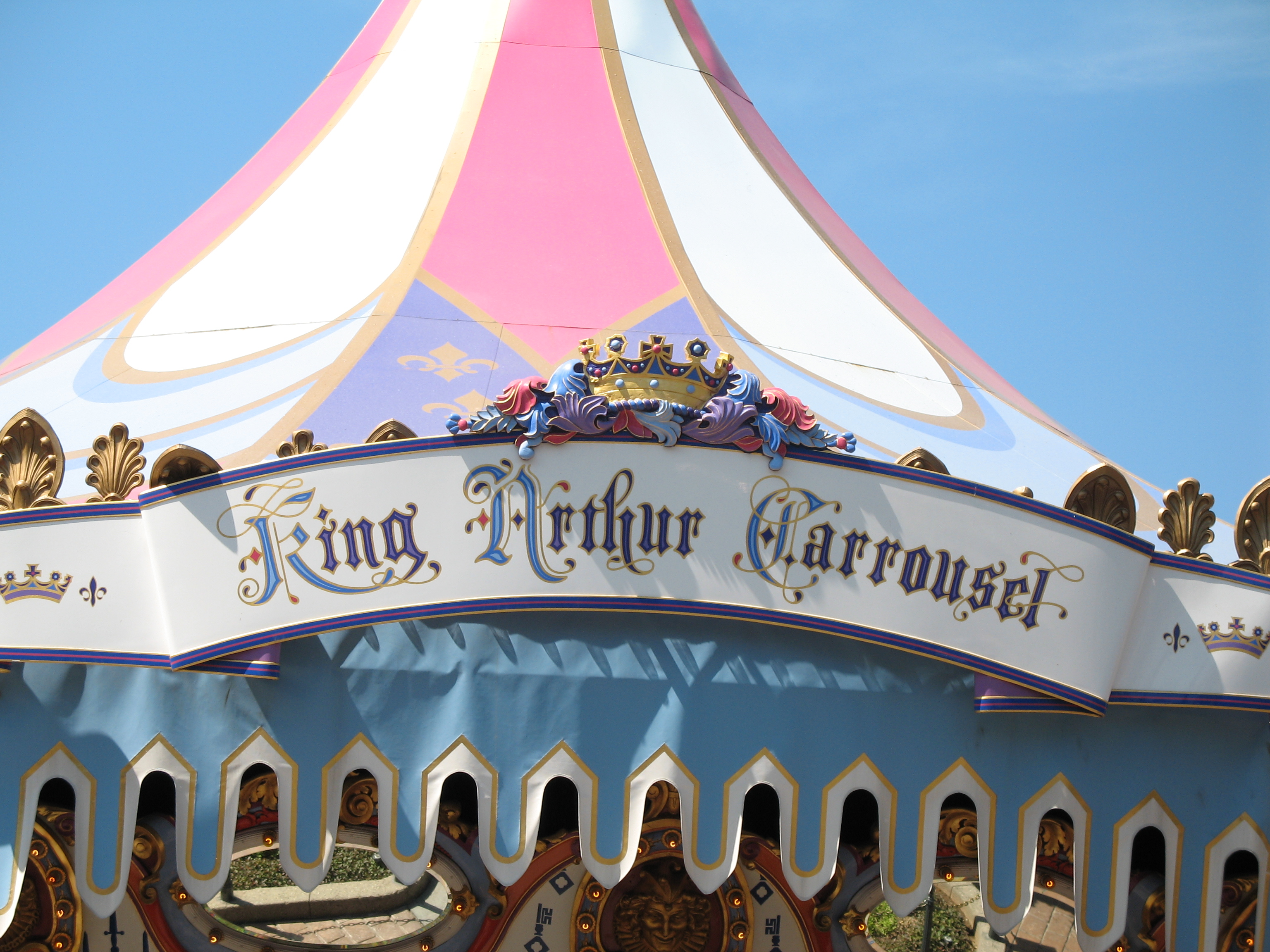

Disneyland
- Area: Fantasyland
- Status: Operating
- Opening date: July 17, 1955

Ride statistics
- Attraction type: Carousel
- Manufacturers: Dentzel Carousel Company (1922 Original); Arrow Development (1955 Refurbishment)
- Designer: Walt Disney Imagineering
- Theme: Knights of the Round Table
- Music: An audio system playing Disney themes and songs (Formerly, a Wurlitzer 157 band organ played the music)
- Vehicle type: 68 various horses, 1 chariot bench, wheelchair grip
- Riders per vehicle: 1
- Duration: 2:18
- Hosted by: Merlin
- Wheelchair accessible

King Arthur Carrousel is a carousel attraction located in Fantasyland at Disneyland in Anaheim, California. The carousel was built in 1922 and operated at Sunnyside Beach Park in Toronto, Ontario, until the park closed. The ride was relocated to Disneyland in 1954, where it was refurbished and modified by Arrow Development, and opened with the park on July 17, 1955.

== Summary ==
The ride features organ music renditions of songs from films including: The Little Mermaid, Beauty and the Beast, Aladdin, and other Disney classics.

== History ==
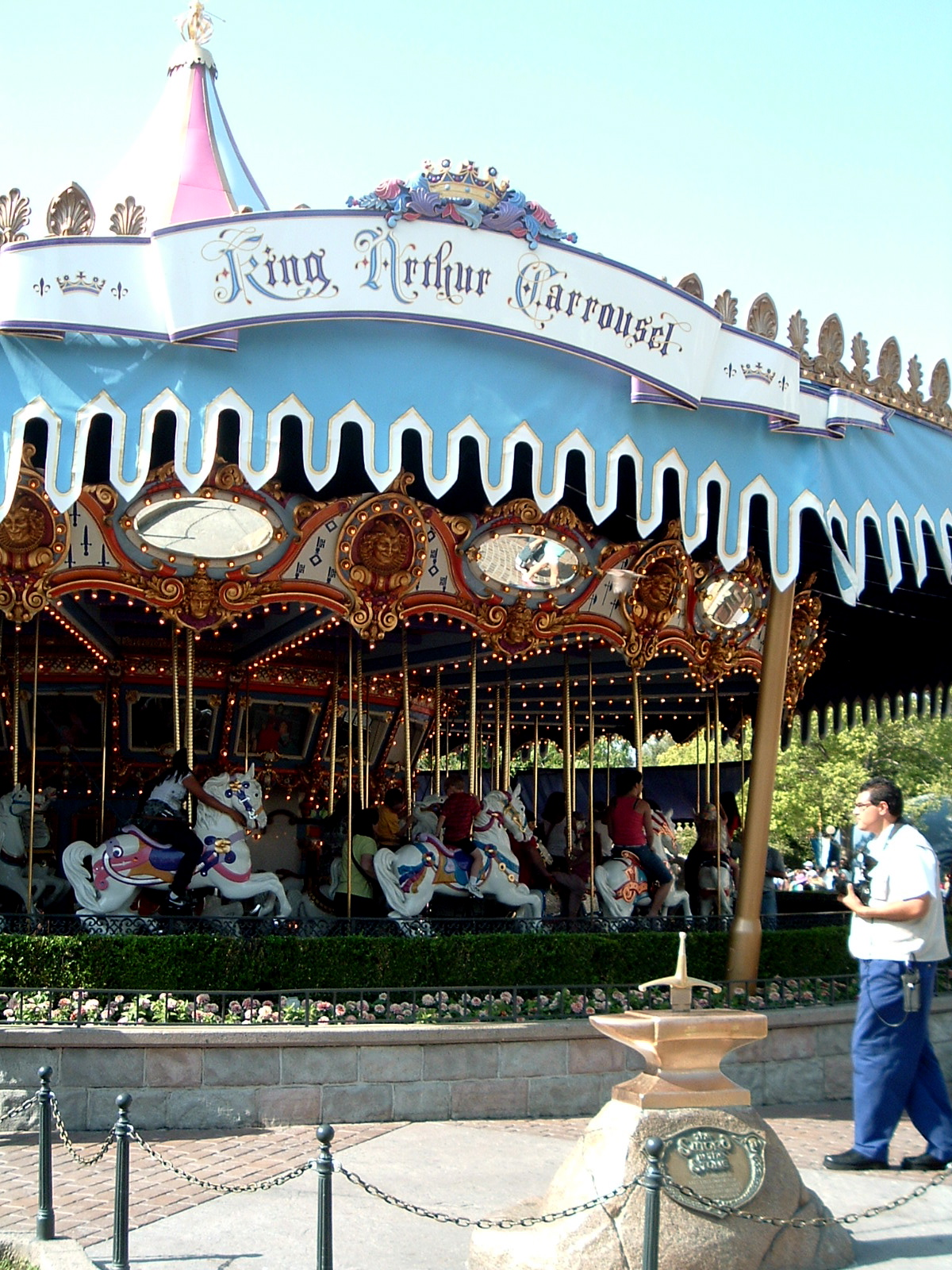
King Arthur succeeded to the throne by pulling Excalibur from the Stone. A ceremony is held here to determine who in the realm shall reign as king for the day.

Inspired by the Griffith Park carousel, Walt Disney wanted something similar for his new theme park: a carousel consisting of all jumpers. A park model Menagerie Carousel was purchased and moved to Disneyland in 1954. The carousel was built by William Dentzel and had been operated at Sunnyside Beach Park in Toronto, Ontario, since 1922; it had three courses of horses and other animals on a platform 72 feet (22 m) in diameter.

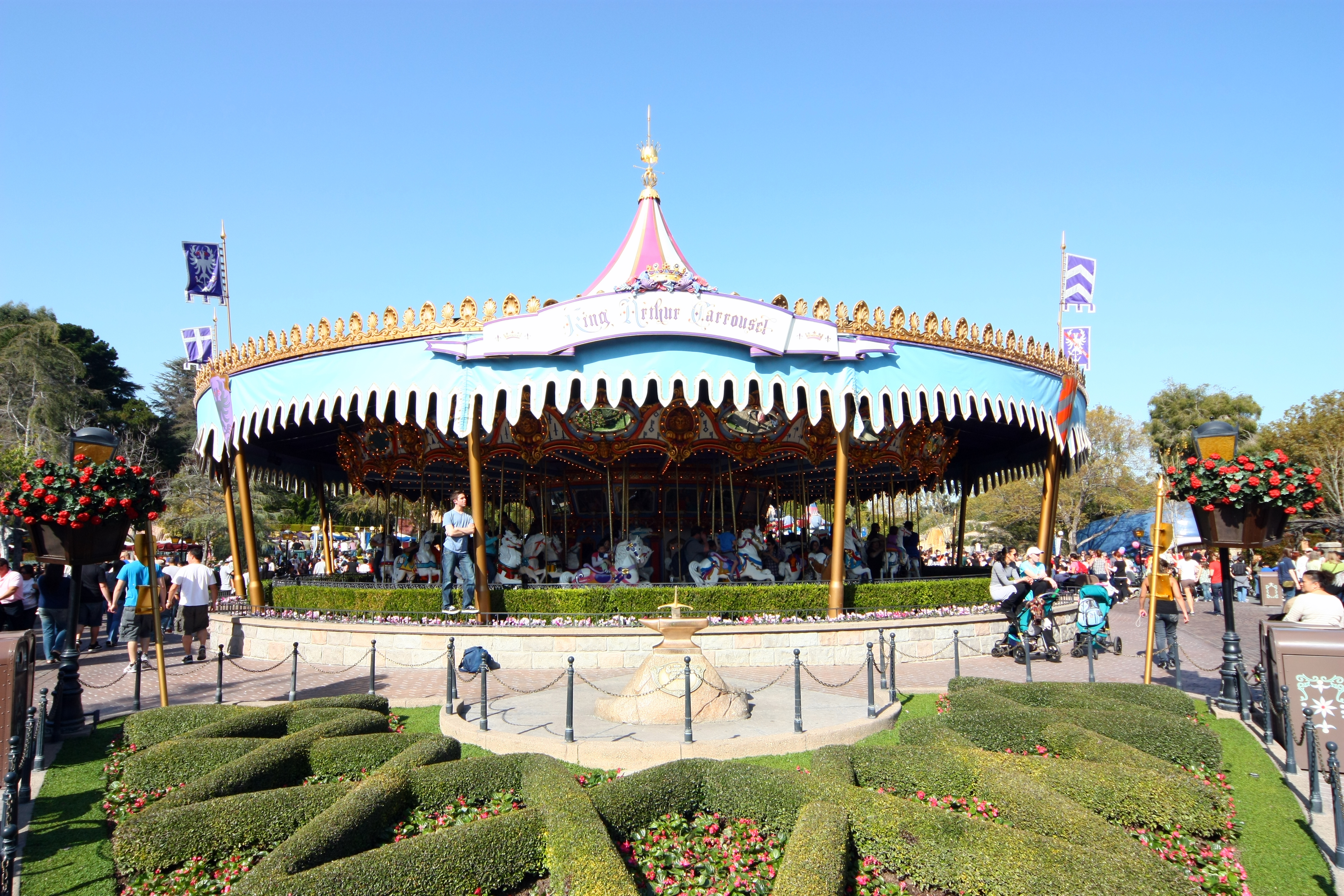

== Preparation ==
The attraction was refurbished and significantly altered by the Arrow Development Company of Mountain View, California in preparation for opening day. It was widened to four courses to increase guest capacity. Of the carousel's 71 horses and one mule, most were carved in the Dentzel factory. To add the outermost course, several carved wooden horses were acquired from a Stein and Goldstein carousel, others from Coney Island's Looff carousel, and more carved horses from various other carousels from around North America. Many horses arrived with crude repairs, such as newspaper-stuffed papier-mâché legs. Standers on the original three rows were converted to jumpers by removing the legs and carving new ones. Custom-built crankshafts were installed overhead to operate each horse as a jumper in motion. The original, ornately hand-carved, wooden chariot benches were removed, and the chariot woodwork was repurposed to decorate the "calliope" tenders and passenger cars of Casey Jr. Circus Train. A Wurlitzer #157 Band Organ facade decorates the carousel, but does not operate. Motifs from Sleeping Beauty were also added to the carousel. By opening, the ride consisted of 72 galloping steeds in 18 rows, all moving, in shades of brown, tan, grey, brownish red, black, and white.

The carousel was placed in a prominent position in the middle of the castle courtyard, able to be viewed from Main Street through the castle gate, drawing guests into the realm of fantasy.

== Refurbishment ==
There were two refurbishments to the carousel: one in 1983 and one in 2003. In 1983, to make room for other attractions, the carousel was moved slightly backwards and received a completely new roof. The carousel was also repainted in orange, red, and blue, and the princess and jester rounding boards were repainted into 18k gold. In preparation for Disneyland's 50th anniversary celebration, the Happiest Homecoming on Earth, King Arthur Carrousel closed for extensive renovations and reopened in February 2003. These renovations included an entirely rebuilt turntable platform, a new computerized operating console and system which halts the carousel each time at the same spot, removal of a row of four horses to accommodate a four-course-wide bench and wheelchair clamps with an access ramp for ADA compliance, which reduced the count of horses to 68. In January 2010, the stirrups of each outer-course horse were replaced to include additional lower loops, increasing accessibility.

== Horses ==
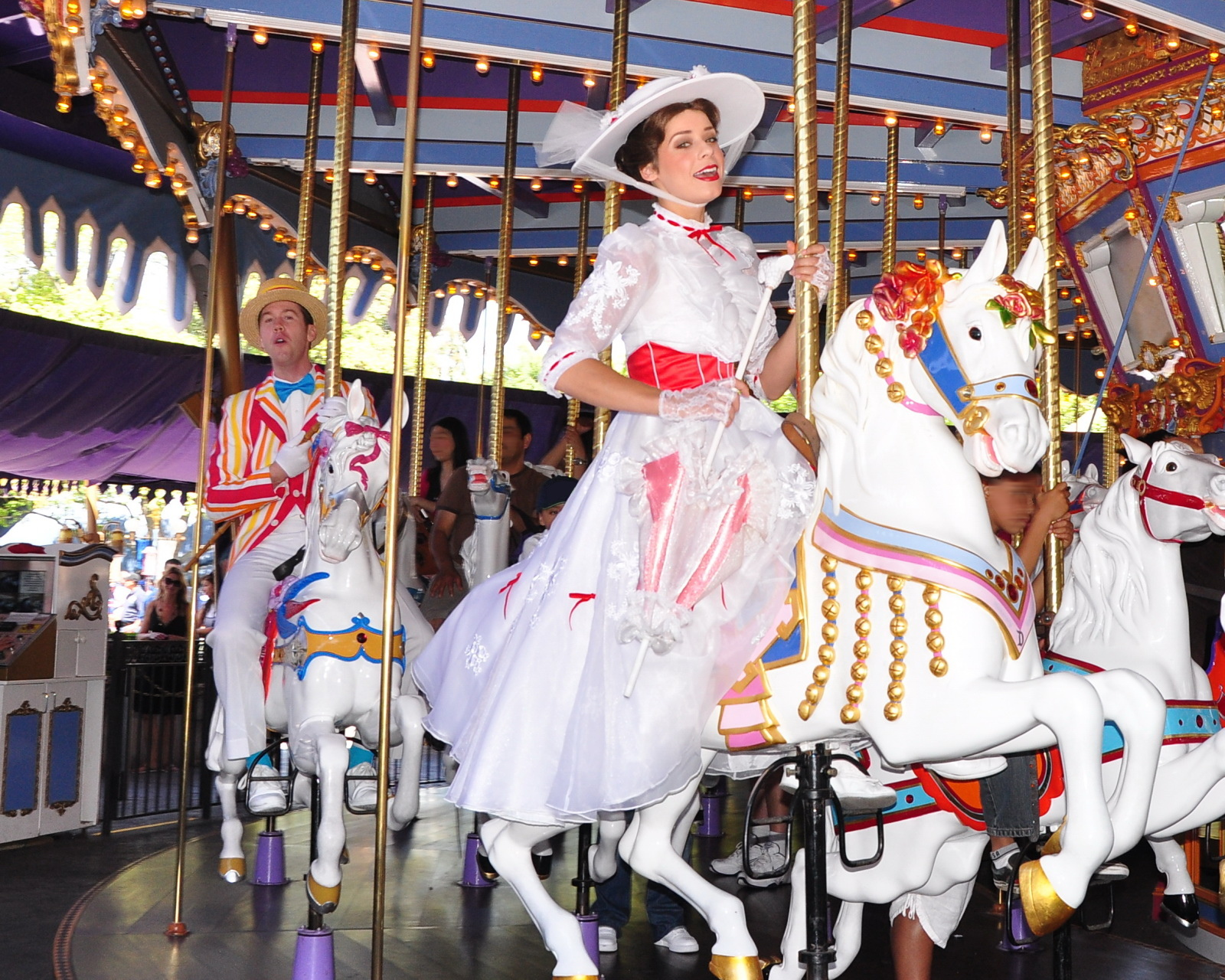
Jingles with her commemorative rider.

Because of the overwhelming popularity of the carousel's single white horse, since 1975 all horses have been painted white. After a 2003 update, the carrousel was reduced to 68 horses and one chariot. Each horse on the carousel has a name; a partial list is available at City Hall on Main Street, U.S.A.

Jingles is the lead horse, and Walt's favorite, named for her very ornate carvings which include straps of jingle bells hanging from her breast collar, decorative quarter sheet behind the saddle, and fastened on the cantle. For Disneyland's 50th anniversary in 2005, Jingles was repainted gold from nose to tail, trimmed in 18k gold leaf set apart as a photo opportunity near the queue for Dumbo the Flying Elephant. When Jingles was reinstalled as lead horse after the Year of a Million Dreams campaign, major portions of Jingles were painted over in a new pastel color theme, except where the gold bells and trim show through, with a translucent treatment of the rosettes on Jingles' head. Decorative detail was painted on the quarter sheet representing the talking-parrot-handled umbrella from Mary Poppins. On the saddle flap, a decorative crest was added, with the monogram "JA", a bird perched on high button shoes, a silhouette of Mary in flight, and the number 50, representing the 50th anniversary of this original Disneyland attraction. Jingles was then ceremoniously dedicated to Julie Andrews on April 8, 2008, as "Honorary Ambassador", the title painted beneath the Hidden Mickey on her cantle.

== Sword in the Stone Ceremony ==
Inspired by the legend of Excalibur from The Sword in the Stone, Merlin used to host a ceremony nearby to determine which guest could pull the sword from the stone to become king for a day. The final ceremony was in 2006.

"By proclamation of Arthur, the right and true king, and lord of all the land, it is time to select a temporary ruler of the realm... to safeguard and protect the kingdom while good King Arthur is on vacation."

The statue with the sword still stands at the front of the carrousel. In January, 2020, a visitor reportedly pulled out the sword.

== See also ==
- Disney carousels
