= List of Magic Kingdom attractions =

The following list shows the attractions found in the theme park Magic Kingdom.

== Main Street, U.S.A. ==
Rides

- Main Street Vehicles (1971-present)
- Walt Disney World Railroad (1971–present)

Entertainment

- Happily Ever After (May 12, 2017 – September 29, 2021, April 3, 2023 –present)
- Disney Enchantment (October 1, 2021 – April 2, 2023, January 11, 2024 – present; After Hours events only)
- Disney Starlight: Dream the Night Away (July 20, 2025–present)

Former attractions

- Main Street Cinema (1971–1998)
- Sorcerers of the Magic Kingdom (2012–2021)
- Swan Boats (1973–1983)

Former entertainment

- Main Street Electrical Parade (1977–1991, 1999–2001, 2010–2016)
- SpectroMagic (1991–1999, 2001–2010)
- Fantasy in the Sky (1971–2003)
- Wishes: A Magical Gathering of Disney Dreams (October 9, 2003 – May 11, 2017)

== Adventureland ==
Rides

- The Magic Carpets of Aladdin
- Jungle Cruise
- Pirates of the Caribbean

Attractions

- Walt Disney's Enchanted Tiki Room – located inside the Sunshine pavilion.
- Swiss Family Treehouse – themed after the 1960 Disney film Swiss Family Robinson.

=== Former attractions ===
- Sunshine pavilion
  - Tropical Serenade (1971–1997)
  - The Enchanted Tiki Room (Under New Management) (1998–2011)
- Tinker Bell's Magical Nook (2011–2014)

== Frontierland ==
Rides

- Big Thunder Mountain Railroad
- Tiana's Bayou Adventure
- Walt Disney World Railroad

Attractions

- Country Bear Musical Jamboree

Former attractions

- Country Bear Jamboree (1971–1986, 1992–2012, 2012–2024)
  - Country Bear Christmas Special (1984—2005; seasonals)
  - Country Bear Vacation Hoedown (1986—1992: seasonals)
- Rivers of America (1973-2025)
  - Davy Crockett's Explorer Canoes (1971–1994)
  - Tom Sawyer Island (1973-2025)
- Splash Mountain (1992−2023)
- Frontierland Shootin' Arcade (1971–2024)

== Liberty Square ==
Rides

- The Haunted Mansion

Attractions

- The Hall of Presidents

Former attractions

- Rivers of America
  - Mike Fink Keel Boats (1971–2001)
  - Liberty Belle Riverboat (1973-2025)

== Fantasyland ==
=== Storybook Circus ===
Rides

- Dumbo the Flying Elephant
- The Barnstormer
- Walt Disney World Railroad

Attractions

- Casey Jr. Splash 'n' Soak Station

=== Enchanted Forest ===
Rides

- Mad Tea Party
- The Many Adventures of Winnie-the-Pooh
- Seven Dwarfs Mine Train
- Under the Sea ~ Journey of the Little Mermaid

Attractions

- Ariel's Grotto – an indoor daily character greeting with Ariel

=== Castle Courtyard ===
Rides

- It's a Small World
- Peter Pan's Flight
- Prince Charming Regal Carrousel – originally Cinderella's Golden Carrousel, renamed in 2010.

Attractions

- Mickey's PhilharMagic – located inside the Fantasyland Theatre

=== Former attractions ===
- Fantasyland Concert Theatre:
  - Mickey Mouse Revue (1971–1983)
  - Magic Journeys (1987–1993)
  - The Legend of the Lion King (1994–2002)
- 20,000 Leagues Under the Sea: Submarine Voyage (1971–1994)
- Mr. Toad's Wild Ride (1971–1998)
- Skyway to Tomorrowland (1971–1999)
- Snow White's Scary Adventure (1971–2012)

== Tomorrowland ==
Rides

- Astro Orbiter
- Buzz Lightyear's Space Ranger Spin
- The Peoplemover
- Space Mountain
- Tomorrowland Speedway
- TRON Lightcycle/Run

Attractions

- Walt Disney's Carousel of Progress (Reopening in 2027)
- Monsters Inc. Laugh Floor
- Stitch's Alien Encounter Character Greeting!

Former attractions

- Skyway to Fantasyland (1971–1999)
- Flight to the Moon (1971–1975)
- Circle-Vision 360°:
  - America the Beautiful (1971–1984)
  - The Timekeeper (1994–2006)
- If You Had Wings (1972–1987)
- Mission to Mars (1975–1993)
- Starjets (1974–1994)
- If You Could Fly (1987–1989)
- Delta Dreamflight (1989–1996)
- The ExtraTERRORestrial Alien Encounter (1995–2003)
- Dreamflight (1996)
- Take Flight (1996–1998)
- Stitch's Great Escape! (2004–2018)

== Upcoming sections ==
=== Villains Land ===
Rides

- Untitled Maleficent Coaster attraction
- Untitled Magic Mirror Dark Boat Ride attraction
- Walt Disney World Railroad

== Former sections ==
=== Mickey's Toontown Fair ===
- Donald's Boat (1996–2011)
- Mickey's Country House (1996–2011)
- Minnie's House (1996–2011)
- Toon Park (1996–2011)
- Pixie Hollow (2008–2014)

== Parades ==
=== Current ===
- Festival of Fantasy Parade (March 9, 2014–present)
- Disney Starlight: Dream the Night Away (July 20, 2025–present)

=== Former ===
- America on Parade (1975–1976)
- Main Street Electrical Parade (1977–1991, 1999–2001, 2010–2016)
- SpectroMagic (1991–1999, 2001–2010)

== Fireworks ==
- Happily Ever After (May 18, 2017 – March 12, 2020, July 1 – September 29, 2021, April 3, 2023 – present)
- Disney Enchantment (October 1, 2021 – April 2, 2023, January 11, 2024 – present; After-hours events only)

=== Seasonals ===
- Fantasy in the Sky (1971–2003; seasonals)
- Disney's Celebrate America (2008–present)
- Disney's Not So Spooky Spectacular! (2019–present)
- Minnie's Wonderful Christmastime Fireworks (2019–present)

==== Former seasonals ====
- Happy HalloWishes: A Grim Grinning Ghosts Spooktacular in the Sky (2005–2018)
- Magic, Music and Mayhem (2008–2010)

=== Former fireworks ===
- Wishes: A Magical Gathering of Disney Dreams (October 9, 2003 – May 11, 2017)
- Celebrate the Magic (November 16, 2012 – November 3, 2016)

== See also ==
- List of Disney theme park attractions
- List of Epcot attractions
- List of Disney's Hollywood Studios attractions
- List of Disney's Animal Kingdom attractions
