= Fantasy in the Sky =

Former fireworks performance at Disney parks

Disneyland
- Area: Sleeping Beauty Castle; Main Street U.S.A.
- Status: Operating
- Opening date: 1958; January 9, 2015; September 9, 2016; January 11, 2019; January 7, 2023; December 31 of any year
- Closing date: May 15, 1999; May 20, 2015; January 29, 2017; January 17, 2019; January 1 of any year
- Replaced: Remember... Dreams Come True (2015); Disneyland Forever (2016)
- Replaced by: Believe... There's Magic in the Stars (2000); Disneyland Forever (2015); Remember... Dreams Come True (2017)

Magic Kingdom
- Area: Cinderella Castle; Main Street U.S.A.
- Status: Operating
- Opening date: 1971; October 1, 2004 (Mickey's Not-So-Scary Halloween Party Version); December 30 of any year
- Closing date: October 11, 2003; October 31, 2004 (Mickey's Not-So-Scary Halloween Party Version); January 1 of any year
- Replaced by: Wishes: A Magical Gathering of Disney Dreams (2003)

Tokyo Disneyland
- Area: Cinderella Castle; World Bazaar
- Status: Closed
- Opening date: 1983; 1995; 2001
- Closing date: 1988; 1997; 2003
- Replaced: Stardust Fantasy (1995); New Century in the Sky (2001)
- Replaced by: Starlight Fantasy (1988–1993); Starlight Magic (1998–2000); Disney Magic In the Sky (2003–2012)

Disneyland Park (Paris)
- Name: Tinkerbell's Fantasy in the Sky
- Area: Le Château de la Belle au Bois Dormant; Main Street U.S.A.
- Status: Closed
- Opening date: 1993
- Closing date: 2005
- Replaced by: Wishes: A Magical Gathering of Disney Dreams

Ride statistics
- Attraction type: Fireworks spectacular
- Designer: Disney Live Entertainment
- Wheelchair accessible

Fantasy in the Sky was the first fireworks performance at Disneyland in Anaheim, California, beginning in 1958 and running until 2002 (with short engagements in 2004 and early 2015). The show also appeared at the Magic Kingdom in Lake Buena Vista, Florida from 1971 until 2003, at Tokyo Disneyland in Urayasu, Chiba, Japan from 1983 until 1988 (with engagements from 1995 until 1997, and again from 2001 until 2003) and at Disneyland Paris from 1993 to 2005 in Marne-la-Vallee, France.

Walt Disney requested a fireworks show against the backdrop of Sleeping Beauty Castle at Disneyland in 1958, to keep guests at the park for longer hours and provide much needed night-time entertainment. Early shows were performed by having cast members manually launch hand flares. The show lasted less than five minutes, and was accompanied by music, with no narration (as is common in Disney parks fireworks today). The show was extremely popular, and became a vital component of the Disneyland experience.

When the second Disney park, the Magic Kingdom, opened in Florida in 1971, it was only natural to duplicate the show there. The predecessors to Walt Disney Creative Entertainment, the company that create all the entertainment for Disney parks worldwide, were able to produce a much larger show with a bigger budget and more space to work with Cinderella Castle is almost three times as tall as its Californian cousin.

As the shows aged, many guests began to miss out the fireworks in their visits as they had seen them so many times. In early 2000, to celebrate Disneyland's 45th anniversary, the Disneyland Entertainment team produced a lavish fireworks production to replace the old show, Believe... There's Magic in the Stars. Many guests formed a sentimental attachment to the show, especially when the company created a new additional section of the show, for Christmas, Believe... In Holiday Magic. Believe was itself replaced in 2005 with a special fireworks spectacular, Remember... Dreams Come True, celebrating Disneyland's fiftieth birthday, making it the most expensive fireworks show Disney has ever developed, with shells all around the park and projects, pyrotechnics and creative lighting. Believe was actually discontinued in 2004, while WDCE were developing Remember. Disneyland Entertainment made a new, smaller show Imagine... A Fantasy in the Sky, using elements from both Fantasy in the Sky and Believe, created to bridge the gap between Believe and Remember.

At the Magic Kingdom, Fantasy in the Sky was only discontinued in 2003. Following the example of Believe at Disneyland, Walt Disney Creative Entertainment developed another show aimed at creating emotional responses among guests, and the result was Wishes. The show was an instant hit, and the theme of the show became the official Magic Kingdom song, as well as forming the base music for Remember at Disneyland. In 2005, the show was extravagantly updated with two additional tags (like the Believe holiday tag) for Halloween and Christmas respectively. Both included additions such as releasing fireworks all around the theme park from launch sites surrounding the Seven Seas Lagoon, not just the castle area. HalloWishes and Holiday Wishes became hits in their own right. A third special themed fireworks show, Magic, Music and Mayhem was created in 2007 for Mickey's Pirate and Princess Party and became a hit in its first two seasons. Two more special fireworks shows debuted in 2008 themed to Independence Day and New Year's Eve, listed below.

At Disneyland Paris, Fantasy in the Sky was discontinued in 2005 to make way for Wishes, a multimedia version of the Magic Kingdom's night time fireworks display produced in honor of Disneyland's fiftieth anniversary. Fantasy in the Sky was sometimes known as Tinkerbell's Fantasy in the Sky or Fantasy in the Sky with Tinkerbell! in Disney literature and at Disneyland Paris.

== Special performances ==
At Disneyland, Fantasy in the Sky was brought back from retirement to feature at the 2004 and 2005 July 4 celebrations and on New Year's Eve in 2004 through 2007. A 2008 revival was cancelled due to high winds. At the Magic Kingdom, it has been performed every year on December 30 and 31, as well as on July 3–4; the July 3 and 4 shows being held in 360 degrees around the park and the Seven Seas Lagoon concurrently. WDW later replaced Fantasy in the Sky for Independence Day, called "Disney's Celebrate America: A 4th of July Concert in the Sky".

Fantasy in the Sky returned for Disneyland and Walt Disney World for 2009 New Year Celebration.

In early 2015, a version of Fantasy in the Sky was brought back at Disneyland Park to bridge the gap between Remember... Dreams Come True ending and Disneyland Forever premiering as part of the park's 60th anniversary. Fantasy in the Sky's last performance was on May 20 of the same year.

Fantasy in the Sky returned to Disneyland Park on September 9, 2016.

For the 2020 New Years Celebration, the Disneyland show was not presented, and was replaced by Mickeys Mix Magic, a fireworks show that was used in the 2019 spring season to celebrate Mickey Mouse's 90th birthday.

== Lifetime changes ==
=== Disneyland ===
The Disneyland version of the show not only received major soundtrack changes, but also received other changes which include the pyrotechnics, and the castle's adjacent lighting. Fantasy in the Sky at Disneyland isn't always shown yearly during New Year's Eve, unlike the Magic Kingdom; however, it is shown during a special event called Throwback Nite. This event, held in Disneyland, happens every mid-late January and/or February. Sometimes, it also has been used to bridge the gaps of shows if one discontinues while another one is in the works. This show is operated from the discontinuation of the first show, and runs until the time the new show is set to debut at the park.

1991–1996	No changes.
1999–2000	No changes.
2000–2001	Soundtrack completely changed, Fantasy in the Sky retirement year.
2001–2002	No changes.
2003–2004	Fantasy in the Sky returned, More pyrotechnics added.
2005	More pyrotechnics added from Remember... Dreams Come True.
2006	Fireworks loadout completely refurbished.
2007	Cancelled due to wind.
2008–2009	No changes.
2010	Addition of searchlights.
2011–2014	No changes.
2015	Some pyrotechnics changed.
2016	Searchlights from Disneyland Forever added.
2017–2018	No changes.
2019	The show ran for 2 days (Dec 31 & Jan 1) because the fireworks show was cancelled due to high winds and the fireworks were shown the following day.
2020	Replaced by Mickey's Mix Magic.
2021	Cancelled due to coronavirus (COVID-19) outbreak and the ongoing closure at Disneyland, giving the 2020–2021 New Year Celebration a miss.
2022	Show returns for New Year's Eve.
2023	Same as 2007, but with rain instead.

=== Magic Kingdom ===
The Magic Kingdom version of the show received many updates during its tenure. Along with multiple soundtrack changes throughout its lifespan, it received electronic firework launching technology in its final years. The show now uses technologies used by other presentations such as Once Upon a Time, Wishes and Happily Ever After. These, along with the show, can still be seen during New Year's Eve and the day before. The spectacular is shown four times every year. Its first performance is on December 30, serving as a rehearsal before its main showing on December 31. On both of these nights, the first performance is at 7:00 PM while the second and main performance is at 11:50 PM. These shows are joined by perimeter fireworks and a New Year's finale for the occasion. Until 2017, the 7:00 PM performance of the show was replaced by Holiday Wishes before showing the New Year's finale.

A special version used to be shown in Mickey's Not So Scary Halloween Party from 1995 to 2004, with a Halloween-themed tag at the end, until it was replaced by HalloWishes.

1971-2002	Multiple soundtrack changes, electronic firework launches, introduction of Halloween Fantasy in the Sky in 1995.
2003	Replaced by Wishes.
2004	Retirement of Halloween Fantasy in the Sky.
2005	More pyrotechnics added; special New Year's version debut.
2007	Introduction of low-level fireworks before the finale, and new shell fireworks.
2015	Addition of dancing searchlights.
2016	Dancing searchlights removed.
2017	Dancing searchlights return, now derived from Happily Ever After.
2018	Castle spires outside of the castle are now illuminated.
2019	New low-level and shell fireworks.
2020-2021	Cancelled due to the coronavirus (COVID-19) pandemic.
2022	Return for the first time since NYE 2019–2020, new laser projections added, new narration voice.

== Soundtrack ==
The soundtrack for the Magic Kingdom 1990s version was released on two official albums:

- Walt Disney World Resort: The Official Album (1999 CD)
- Walt Disney World Resort: Official Album (2000 CD)

The soundtrack for the Disneyland Paris version was released on:

- Disneyland Paris: Main Street Electrical Parade (2000 CD)

== Show soundtrack ==
=== Disneyland version ===
==== 1958–1966 ====
- "Heigh-Ho"
- "Mickey Mouse March" (from "The Mickey Mouse Club")
- "Bibbidi-Bobbidi-Boo"
- "Whistle While You Work"
- "You Can Fly, You Can Fly, You Can Fly"

==== 1966–May 15, 1999 ====
To commemorate the opening of It's a Small World on May 28th, the soundtrack was changed:

- "Zip-A-Dee-Doo-Dah" (from Song of the South)
- "A Dream Is a Wish Your Heart Makes" (from Cinderella)
- Mary Poppins
  - "Supercalifragilisticexpialidocious"
  - "Let's Go Fly a Kite"
- "It's a Small World Song" (from It's a Small World)
- Snow White and the Seven Dwarfs
  - "Whistle While You Work"
  - "Heigh-Ho"
- "Raiders March" (from Raiders of the Lost Ark) (1995 only)
- "Mickey Mouse March" (from The Mickey Mouse Club)
- "Sorcerer's Apprentice" (from Fantasia)
- The patriotic song "This Is My Country"

==== 2015–2019 ====
- "A Dream Is a Wish Your Heart Makes" (from "Cinderella")
- "Mary Poppins"
  - "Supercalifragilisticexpialidocious"
  - "Let's Go Fly a Kite"
- "It's a Small World Song" (from "It's a Small World")
- "Snow White and the Seven Dwarfs"
  - "Whistle While You Work"
  - "Heigh-Ho"
- "Zip-A-Dee-Doo-Dah" (from "Song of the South")

==== 2023–present ====
Soundtrack changed in opening and finale as part of inclusivity:

- "A Dream Is a Wish Your Heart Makes" (from "Cinderella")
- "Mary Poppins"
  - "Supercalifragilisticexpialidocious"
  - "Let's Go Fly a Kite"
- "It's a Small World Song" (from "It's a Small World")
- "Snow White and the Seven Dwarfs"
  - "Whistle While You Work"
  - "Heigh-Ho"
- "When You Wish Upon a Star" (from Pinocchio)

=== Disneyland New Year's Eve version ===
From 2001-2008, before the countdown began, the hosts would sing "Brand New Day" from Tokyo Disneyland's 2000 countdown parade on the balcony of Sleeping Beauty Castle. This was removed for unknown reasons beginning in 2009.

==== 2001-2002 ====
- "Brand New Day"
- "Dramatic End of Year Music and Countdown"
- "Auld Lang Syne"
- "Celebrate The Future Hand in Hand" (Millennium Celebration encore)
- "When You Wish Upon a Star" (from "Pinocchio")

==== c.1995-2001, 2003-2019 ====
- "Brand New Day" (2003-2008 only)
- "Dramatic End of Year Music and Countdown"
- "Auld Lang Syne"
- "A Dream Is a Wish Your Heart Makes" (from "Cinderella")
- "Mary Poppins"
  - "Supercalifragilisticexpialidocious"
  - "Let's Go Fly a Kite"
- "It's a Small World Song" (from "It's a Small World")
- "Snow White and the Seven Dwarfs"
  - "Whistle While You Work"
  - "Heigh-Ho"
- "Zip-A-Dee-Doo-Dah" (from "Song of the South")

==== 2021-present ====
Soundtrack changed in opening and finale as part of inclusivity:

- "Dramatic End of Year Music and Countdown"
- "Auld Lang Syne"
- "A Dream Is a Wish Your Heart Makes" (from "Cinderella")
- "Mary Poppins"
  - "Supercalifragilisticexpialidocious"
  - "Let's Go Fly a Kite"
- "It's a Small World Song" (from "It's a Small World")
- "Snow White and the Seven Dwarfs"
  - "Whistle While You Work"
  - "Heigh-Ho"
- "When You Wish Upon a Star" (from "Pinocchio")

=== Magic Kingdom version (1971-1996) ===
- "Zip-A-Dee-Doo-Dah" (from Song of the South)
- "A Dream Is a Wish Your Heart Makes" (from Cinderella)
- Mary Poppins
  - "Supercalifragilisticexpialidocious"
  - "Let's Go Fly a Kite"
- "It's a Small World Song" (from It's a Small World)
- Snow White and the Seven Dwarfs
  - "Whistle While You Work"
  - "Heigh-Ho"
- "Mickey Mouse March" (from The Mickey Mouse Club)
- "Sorcerer's Apprentice" (from Fantasia)

=== 1996-1999 ===
- "When You Wish upon a Star" (from Pinocchio) (opening)
- "Zip-A-Dee-Doo-Dah" (from Song of the South)
- "A Dream Is a Wish Your Heart Makes" (from Cinderella)
- Mary Poppins
  - "Supercalifragilisticexpialidocious"
  - "Let's Go Fly a Kite"
- "It's a Small World Song" (from It's a Small World)
- Snow White and the Seven Dwarfs
  - "Whistle While You Work"
  - "Heigh-Ho"
- "Mickey Mouse March" (from The Mickey Mouse Club)
- "Sorcerer's Apprentice" (from Fantasia)
- "Remember the Magic" (WDW 25th Anniversary encore)

=== Millennium Celebration version (1999–2000); New Year's Eve version (2007–present) ===
- Peter Pan
  - "The Second Star to the Right"
  - "You Can Fly, You Can Fly, You Can Fly"
- "I've Got No Strings" (from Pinocchio)
- "It's a Small World Song" (from It's a Small World)
- "Grim Grinning Ghosts" (from The Haunted Mansion)
- "The Ballad of Davy Crockett" (from Davy Crockett, King of the Wild Frontier)
- "Yo Ho (A Pirate's Life for Me)" (from Pirates of the Caribbean)
- "Under the Sea" (from The Little Mermaid)
- "A Whole New World" (from Aladdin)
- "When You Wish upon a Star" (from Pinocchio)
- Reprise of "A Whole New World"
- Countdown to the New Year – hosted by Mickey, Minnie, and Goofy
- Auld Lang Syne
- Celebrate The Future Hand in Hand (1999–2000 version)

=== 1999–2003 ===
- Peter Pan
  - "The Second Star to the Right"
  - "You Can Fly, You Can Fly, You Can Fly"
- "I've Got No Strings" (from Pinocchio)
- "It's a Small World Song" (from It's a Small World)
- "Grim Grinning Ghosts" (from The Haunted Mansion)
- "The Ballad of Davy Crockett" (from Davy Crockett, King of the Wild Frontier)
- "Yo Ho (A Pirate's Life for Me)" (from Pirates of the Caribbean)
- "Under the Sea" (from The Little Mermaid)
- "A Whole New World" (from Aladdin)
- "When You Wish upon a Star" (from Pinocchio)
- Reprise of "A Whole New World"

=== Halloween Fantasy in the Sky (1999-2004) ===
- Peter Pan
  - "The Second Star to the Right"
  - "You Can Fly, You Can Fly, You Can Fly"
- "I've Got No Strings" (from Pinocchio)
- "It's a Small World Song" (from It's a Small World)
- "Grim Grinning Ghosts" (from The Haunted Mansion)
- "The Ballad of Davy Crockett" (from Davy Crockett, King of the Wild Frontier)
- "Yo Ho (A Pirate's Life for Me)" (from Pirates of the Caribbean)
- "Under the Sea" (from The Little Mermaid)
- "Night on Bald Mountain" (from Fantasia; voice-over by the Wicked Witch/Evil Queen from Snow White)

=== New Year's Eve version (2005–2006) ===
- Peter Pan
  - "The Second Star to the Right"
  - "You Can Fly, You Can Fly, You Can Fly"
- "I've Got No Strings" (from Pinocchio)
- "It's a Small World Song" (from It's a Small World)
- "Grim Grinning Ghosts" (from The Haunted Mansion)
- "The Ballad of Davy Crockett" (from Davy Crockett, King of the Wild Frontier)
- "Yo Ho (A Pirate's Life for Me)" (from Pirates of the Caribbean)
- "Under the Sea" (from The Little Mermaid)
- Countdown to the New Year – hosted by Mickey, Minnie, and Goofy
- Auld Lang Syne
- "A Whole New World" (from Aladdin)
- "When You Wish Upon A Star" (from Pinocchio)
- Reprise of "A Whole New World"

=== Tokyo Disneyland version (1995–2003 version) ===
- "A Dream Is a Wish Your Heart Makes" (from Cinderella)
- Mary Poppins
  - "Let's Go Fly a Kite"
- "It's a Small World Song" (from It's a Small World)
- Snow White and the Seven Dwarfs
  - "Whistle While You Work"
  - "Heigh-Ho"
- "Mickey Mouse March" (from The Mickey Mouse Club)
- "Sorcerer's Apprentice" (from Fantasia)
- "Zip-A-Dee-Doo-Dah" (from "Song of the South")

=== Tokyo DisneySea Special version (September 2-4, 2001) ===
- "Tokyo DisneySea Medley"

Note: This is not a real Fantasy in the Sky version.

=== Disneyland Paris version (1993-2005) ===
- Peter Pan
  - "You Can Fly, You Can Fly, You Can Fly"
  - "Following the Leader"
  - "What Made the Red Man Red"
  - "Never Smile at a Crocodile"
  - "A Pirate's Life"
  - "The Elegant Captain Hook"
  - Reprise of "You Can Fly, You Can Fly, You Can Fly"
  - Exit Music: Reprise of "Never Smile at a Crocodile"
