= Wishes: A Magical Gathering of Disney Dreams =

Former fireworks show at Magic Kingdom

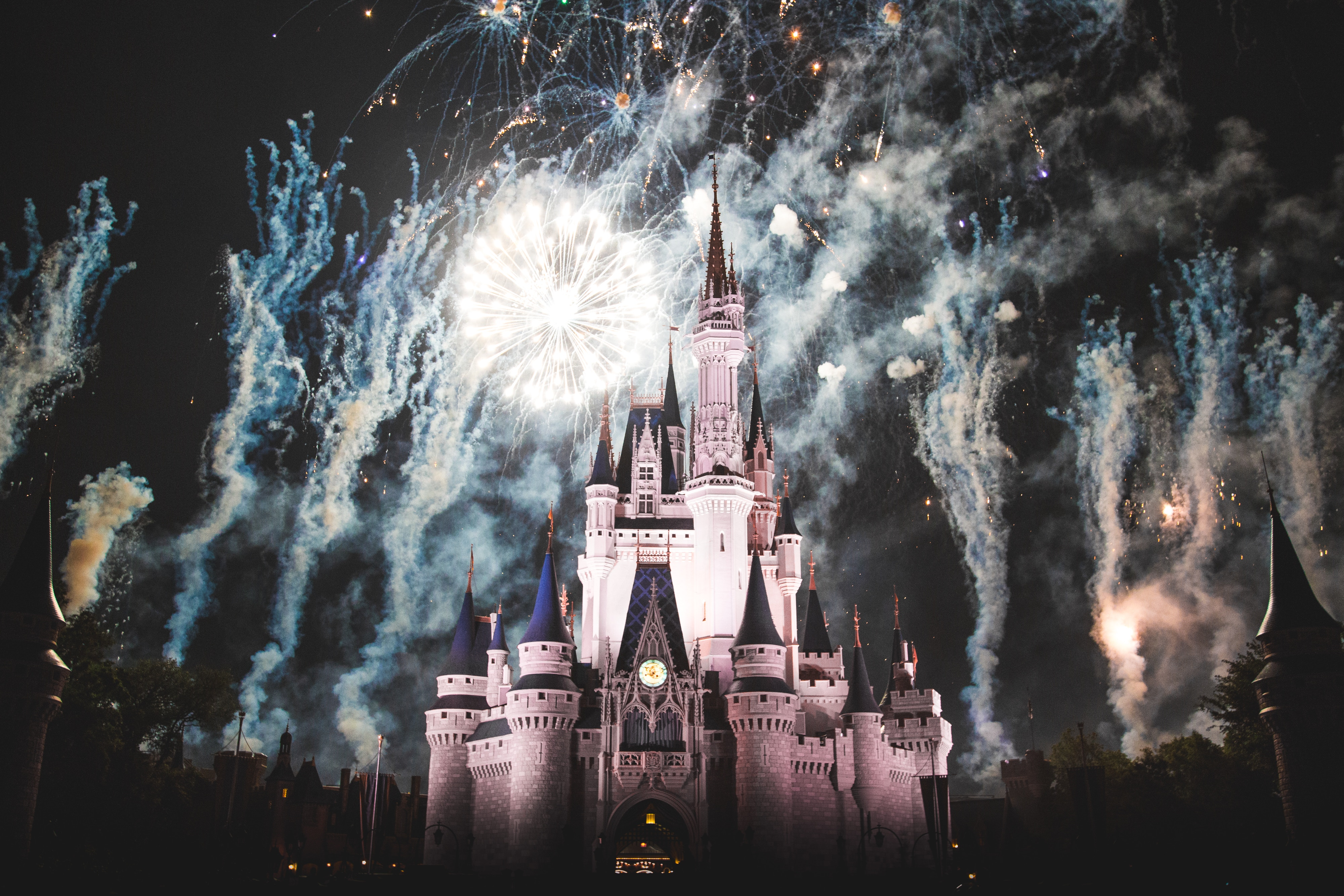
- Show at Magic Kingdom

Magic Kingdom
- Area: Cinderella Castle; Main Street U.S.A.
- Status: Removed
- Opening date: October 9, 2003
- Closing date: May 11, 2017
- Replaced: Fantasy in the Sky
- Replaced by: Happily Ever After

Disneyland Park (Paris)
- Area: Le Château de la Belle au Bois Dormant; Main Street U.S.A.
- Status: Removed
- Opening date: July 16, 2005
- Closing date: August 25, 2007
- Replaced: Fantasy in the Sky
- Replaced by: The Enchanted Fireworks

Ride statistics
- Attraction type: Fireworks show
- Designer: Walt Disney Creative Entertainment
- Duration: 12:26
- Host: Jiminy Cricket & The Blue Fairy
- Sponsor: PANDORA (2014–2017)
- Firework Shells: 683
- Wheelchair accessible

Wishes: A Magical Gathering of Disney Dreams was a fireworks show at the Magic Kingdom theme park of Walt Disney World. The show debuted at the park on October 9, 2003, and was developed by Walt Disney Creative Entertainment, under the direction of VP Parades & Spectaculars, Steve Davison, who was assigned to create a replacement for the 32-year-old Fantasy in the Sky fireworks. Several variations of the show at Walt Disney World include Happy HalloWishes during "Mickey's Not-So-Scary Halloween Party", Holiday Wishes during "Mickey's Very Merry Christmas Party", and Magic, Music and Mayhem during the 2007 event Disney's Pirate and Princess Party. The multimedia version at Disneyland Park in Disneyland Paris premiered on July 16, 2005, and had its final show on August 25, 2007. The beginning and ending sequence were also used for “Remember... Dreams Come True” in 2005 for Disneyland’s 50th anniversary firework show, but the Jiminy Cricket bits were replaced with Julie Andrews bits. The show at the Magic Kingdom was sponsored by Pandora Jewelry. The show was presented for the last time on May 11, 2017, at the Magic Kingdom Park and was replaced by Happily Ever After in the following day.

== Wishes at the Magic Kingdom ==
=== Wishes: A Magical Gathering of Disney Dreams ===
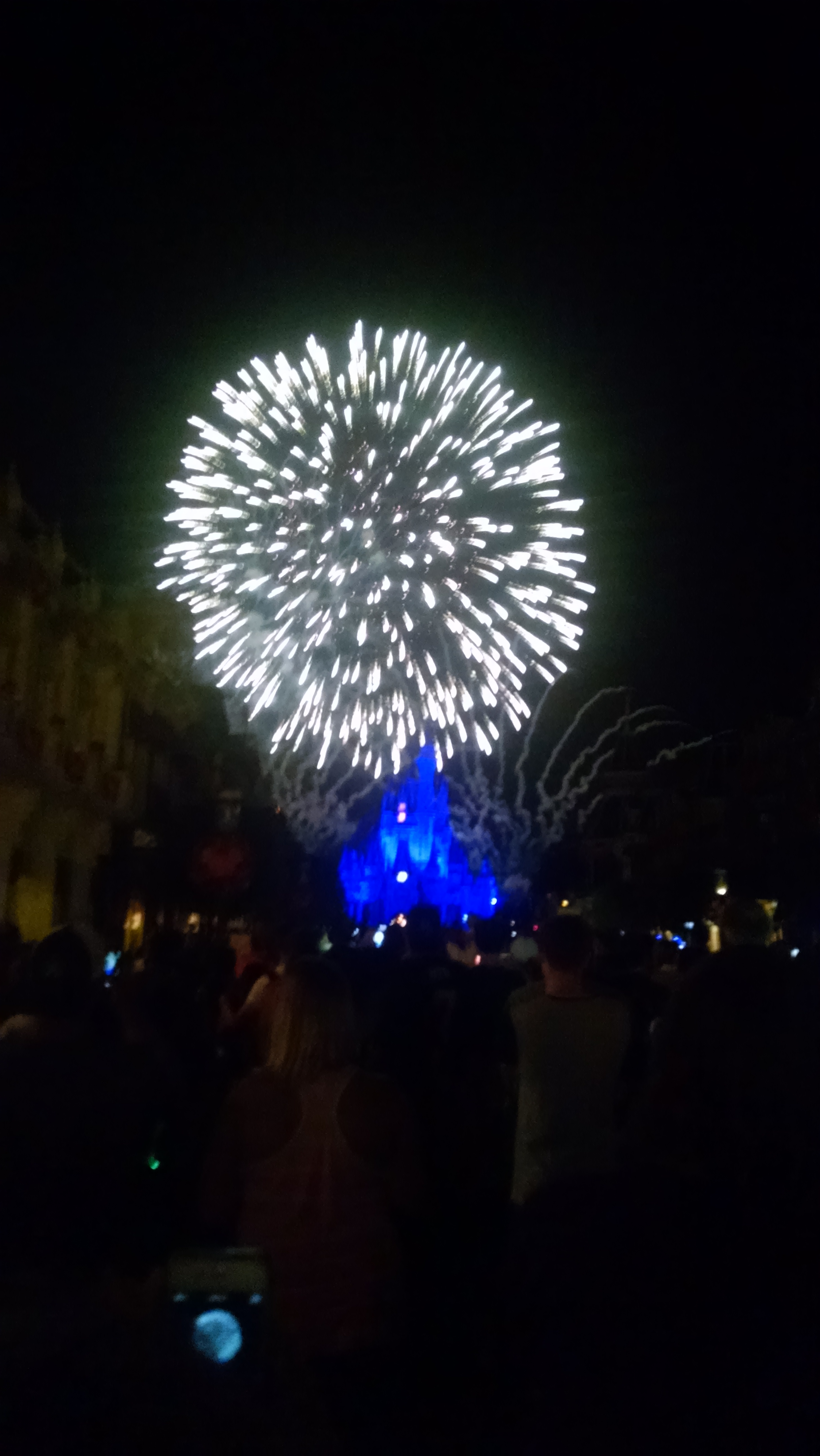
Wishes: A Magical Gathering of Disney Dreams fireworks show at the Magic Kingdom (2014).

The show was hosted by Jiminy Cricket, the Blue Fairy, and revolved around the Wishes of famous Disney characters, good and bad. The lights on Cinderella Castle changed colors throughout the show, reflecting the different stages of Wishes' narrative. During different parts of the show, a "wishing star" firework was shot, cresting approximately 100 feet above the castle’s bright spires. While most of the characters in the show are only heard as part of the show's music track, Wishes also featured an appearance from Tinker Bell as she flew from the tallest spire of Cinderella Castle. Wishes included 683 fireworks, that fire during the 557 cues.

The show begins with a shooting star and then children singing Star Light, Star Bright followed by the Blue Fairy and Jiminy Cricket encouraging the guests to make a wish. Soon, Tinkerbell flies out of the castle, as Cinderella, Snow White, Ariel, Peter Pan, Pinocchio, and Aladdin make their Wishes. Soon, Jiminy tells people to have Courage, as an instrumental version of "Go the Distance" plays. Next, Jiminy tells people that wishes come true when they're from the heart, and a medley of music from Cinderella, Sleeping Beauty, and Beauty and The Beast plays. After Jiminy tells the audience that dreams can happen in the most unexpected ways, the Genie appears as fireworks synchronized to "Friend Like Me" play, which soon changes into "The Sorcerer's Apprentice". Suddenly, Jiminy warns guests to let their conscience be their guide, as The Evil Queen invades the performance. Jiminy then informs the audience to be careful what they wish for, as they could end up in a mess, but reminds them that when things look bad, fate steps in to see it through. The Blue Fairy returns to remind guests that they must always believe in their wishes. The show ends with a cavalcade of wishes and Jiminy thanking the audience.

=== Happy HalloWishes: A Grim Grinning Ghost Spooktacular in the Sky ===
HalloWishes debuted in 2005 (until 2018) and was performed at the separate-admission event Mickey's Not-So-Scary Halloween Party at the Magic Kingdom in lieu of the regular Wishes show. Taking its name from the theme song for the attraction Haunted Mansion, the show featured fireworks synchronized to Disney Villains themes and other Halloween music.

=== Holiday Wishes: Celebrate The Spirit of the Season ===
Holiday Wishes: Celebrate the Spirit of the Season replaced Wishes during Mickey's Very Merry Christmas Party, and during the park's regular operating days near Christmas Day (until 2018). The show featured fireworks performed to remixed Christmas songs (including "Spirit of the Season") and an appearance by Tinker Bell.

Although this show was created for Magic Kingdom, one part of this show to lives on to this day at It's a Small World Holiday at Disneyland as a pre-show/post-show for Believe... In Holiday Magic.

=== Magic, Music, and Mayhem ===
This fireworks show replaced Wishes at Mickey's Pirate and Princess Party, and features music from the Disney Princess library of animated films and the Pirates of the Caribbean film franchise.

=== Disney's Celebrate America ===
This fireworks show replaced Wishes at July 4 every year since 2008, and features music that celebrates the traditions, spirit and music of the United States of America. The show is also presented at the Disneyland Resort (with Disney California Adventure having a shorter version) as well.

=== Fantasy in the Sky: New Year's Eve Celebration (2005–2016) ===
During New Year's Eve, the regular Wishes show was shown and then supplemented by a special presentation of Fantasy in the Sky, featuring numerous fireworks and instrumental music from an array of Disney films and attractions. The show is hosted by Mickey Mouse, Minnie Mouse and Goofy. This show is still presented to this day during New Year's Eve and the day before.

=== Summer Nightastic! ===
In 2010, Walt Disney World replaced Wishes with another fireworks show during a summer entertainment package called "Summer Nightastic!". Magic, Music, and Mayhem show comes from Disney's Pirate and Princess Party.

=== The Magic, Memories, and You! ===
In 2011 as part of the 40th anniversary of The Magic Kingdom, a new pre-show/post-show was made. This show includes projections, and Photopass pictures being projected into. Disneyland had this pre-show/post-show as part of their "let the memories begin" event. This preshow/post-show ended in September and was replaced with Celebrate the Magic in November while at Disneyland, before it was replaced with Disneyland Forever three years later.

=== Disney's Cast Member Celebration (2022) ===
On May 3, 2022, Magic Kingdom Park was closed to the public at 4:30 pm for a special Cast Member celebration fireworks show. During the Cast Member celebration at Magic Kingdom park, Cast Members were shown a tribute to Fantasy in the Sky, Wishes: A Magical Gathering of Disney Dreams, and Happily Ever After before Disney Enchantment.

== Wishes at Disneyland Paris ==
=== Wishes: A Magical Gathering of Disney Dreams ===
Disneyland Park introduced a fireworks and multimedia show based on the Magic Kingdom's Wishes pyrotechnics show. The show ran its first year from July 16 to August 28, 2005, with performances every night at 11:15 p.m. The show ran every summer season from 2005 until 2007 and was replaced in 2008 by The Enchanted Fireworks for Valentines Day, and in 2012, Disney Dreams!

=== Disney's New Years Celebration (2022) ===
On December 31, 2022, "Wishes" returned for a one-off celebration spectacular including new projections on Le Château De La Belle Au Bois Dormant.

== See also ==
- Remember... Dreams Come True
- Believe... There's Magic in the Stars
- Disney's Celebrate America
- Magical: Disney's Nighttime Spectacular of Magical Celebrations
