= Swan boat =

Swan boat(s) may refer to:

- Swan boat (racing), a type of boat originating in Thailand
- Swan Boats (Boston, Massachusetts), a cultural icon of that city
- Swan Boats (Magic Kingdom), a former ride at Magic Kingdom
