= Cinderella Castle =

Fairy tale castle at two Disney parks

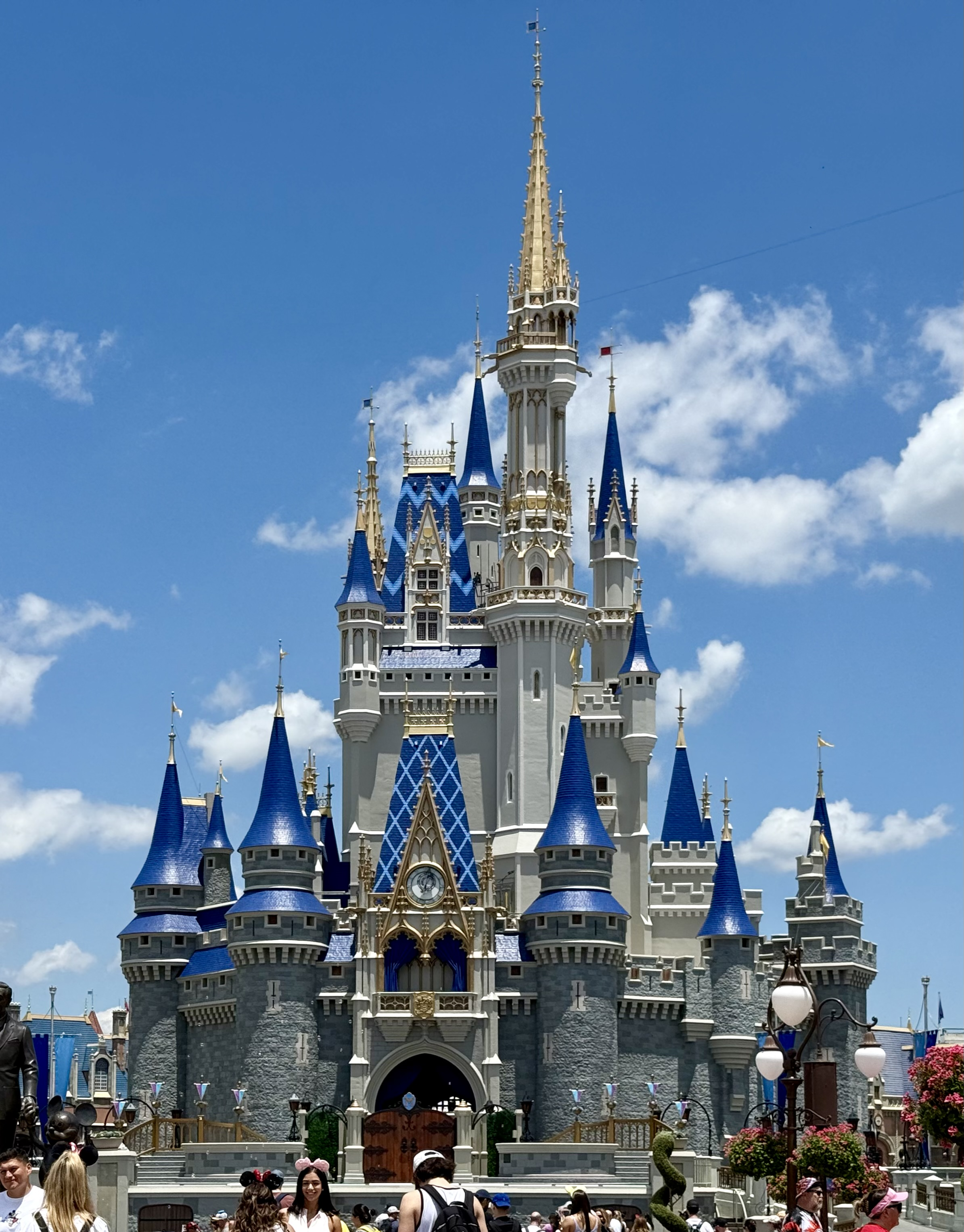
- Cinderella Castle in 2026

Magic Kingdom
- Area: Fantasyland (Castle Courtyard)
- Coordinates: 28.4195°N 81.5812°W
- Status: Operating
- Opening date: October 1, 1971

Tokyo Disneyland
- Area: Fantasyland
- Coordinates: 35°37′55.5″N 139°52′51.0″E
- Status: Operating
- Opening date: April 15, 1983

Ride statistics
- Designer: WED Enterprises
- Theme: Cinderella and Gothic Revival
- Height: 189 ft (58 m)

Cinderella Castle is a fairy tale castle at the center of two Disney theme parks: Magic Kingdom at Walt Disney World, and Tokyo Disneyland at Tokyo Disney Resort. Based on Cinderella's fairy tale castle from Disney's 1950 animated feature film, both serve as the symbol and flagship attraction for their respective theme parks. Along with Sleeping Beauty Castle, the Castle is a main symbol of the Walt Disney Company.

== Exterior ==
=== Inspiration and design ===
Cinderella Castle was inspired by a variety of real and fictional palaces. These included in the Castle such structures as Alcázar of Segovia, Schwerin Castle, Hohenzollern Castle, Château d'Ussé, Château de Saumur, Pierrefonds, Chambord, Neuschwanstein Castle in Bavaria and Craigievar Castle in Scotland. Other sources of inspiration include the spire of Notre-Dame de Paris, the Moszna Castle in Poland, built in the 18th century, and the Týn Church in Prague, Czech Republic, built in the 14th century. The chief designer of the castle, Herbert Ryman, also referenced the original design for the castle in the film franchise Cinderella and his own well-known creation— Sleeping Beauty Castle from Disneyland in California and Paris.

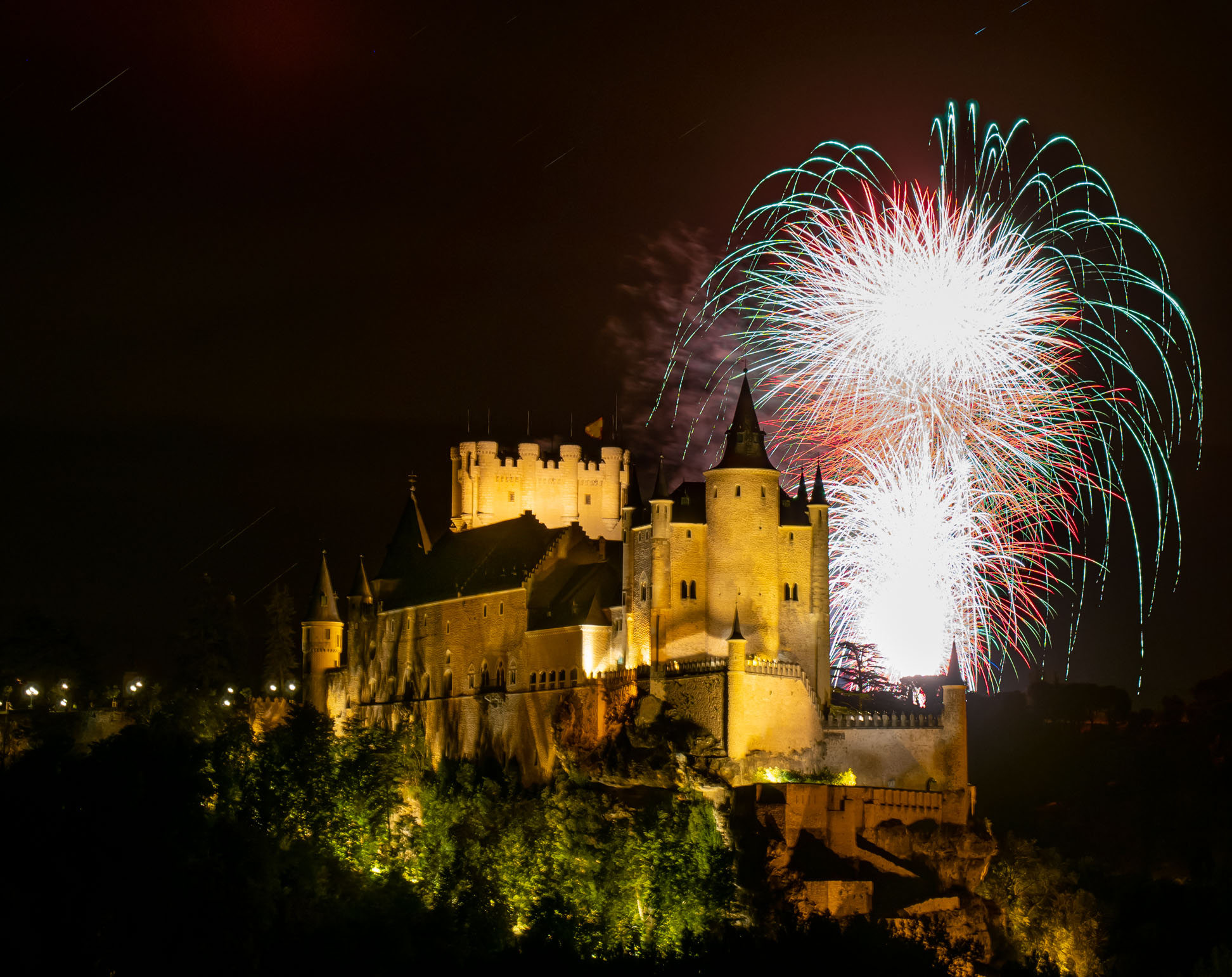
Alcázar of Segovia

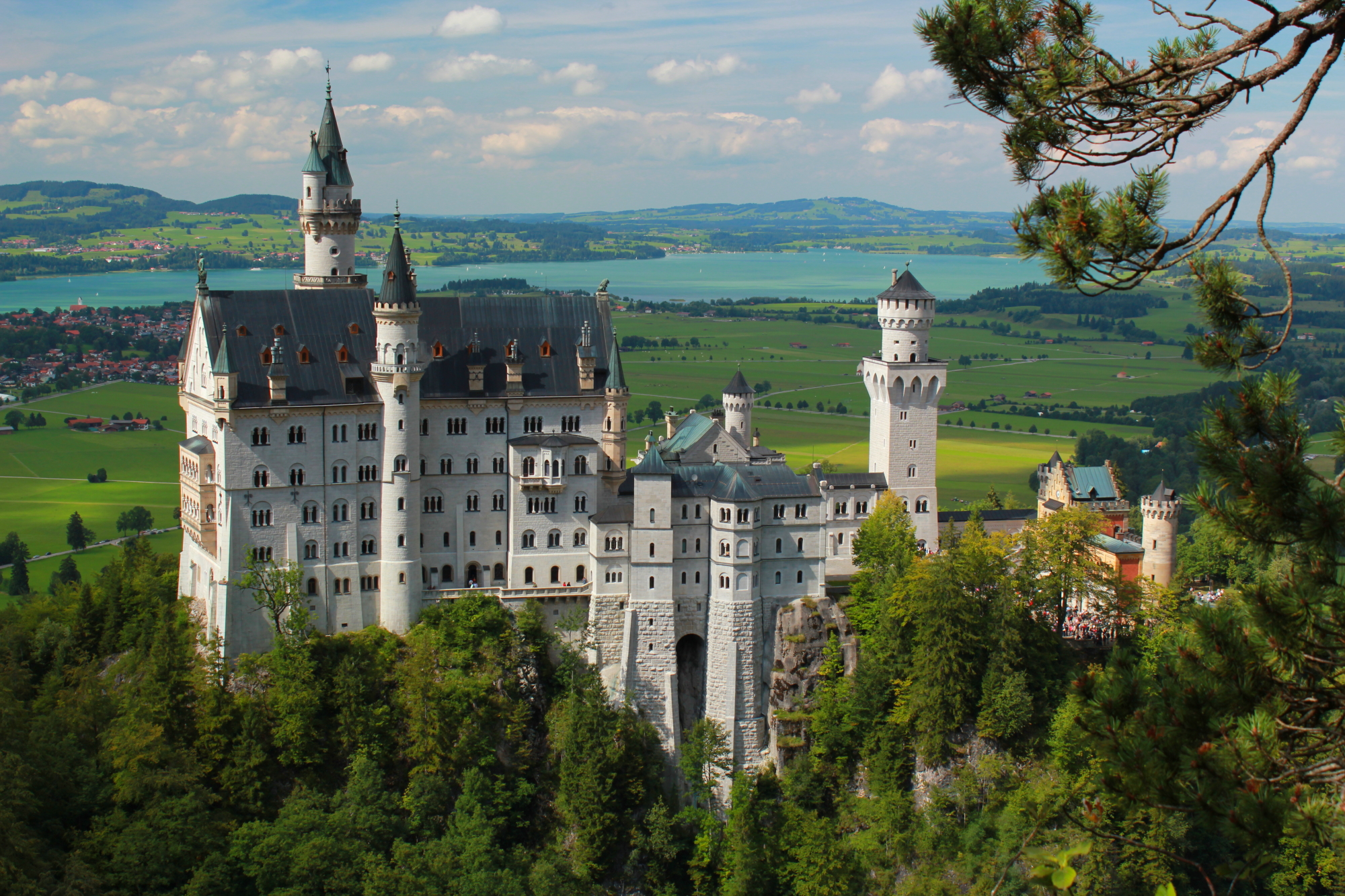
Neuschwanstein Castle

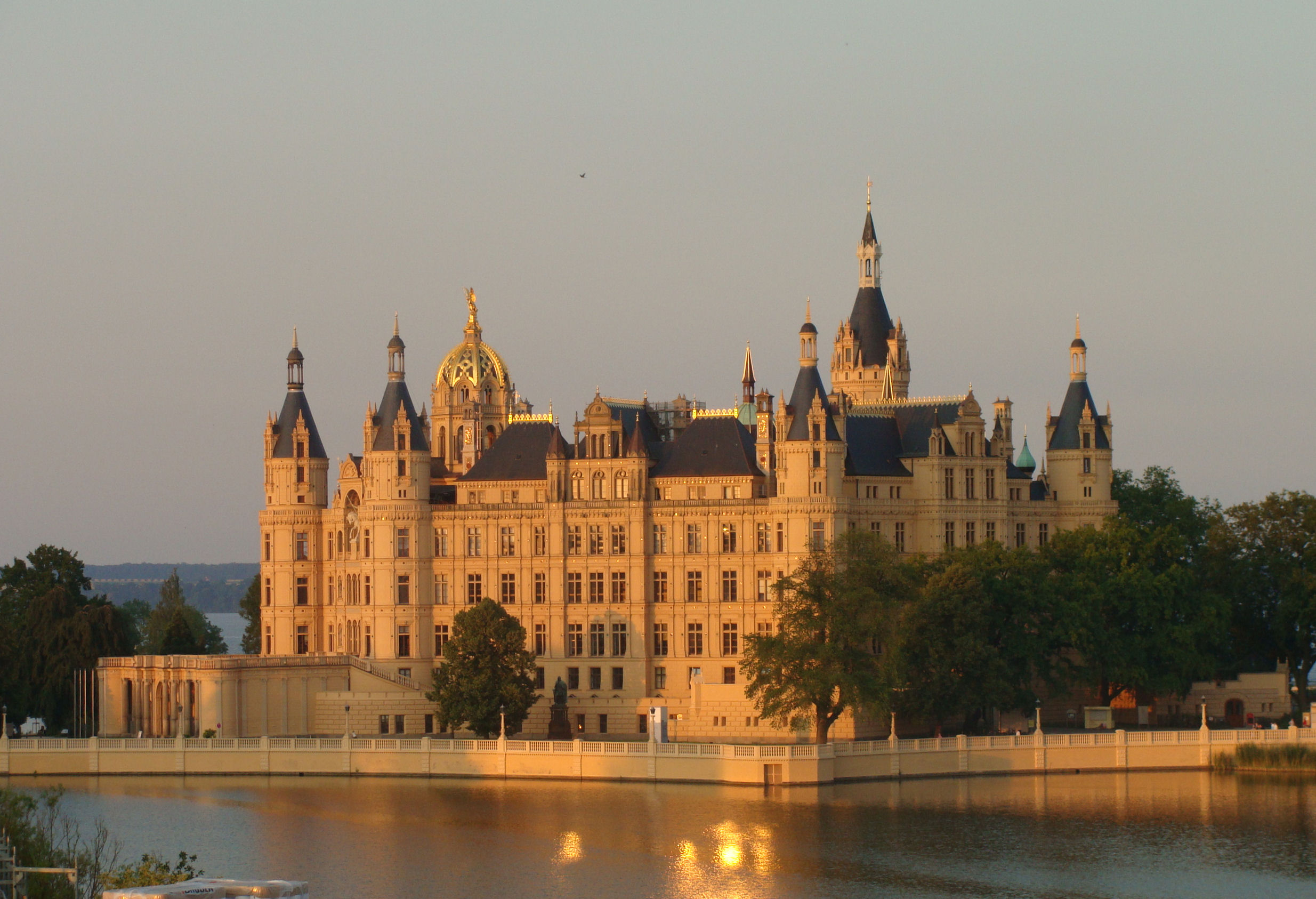
Schwerin Castle

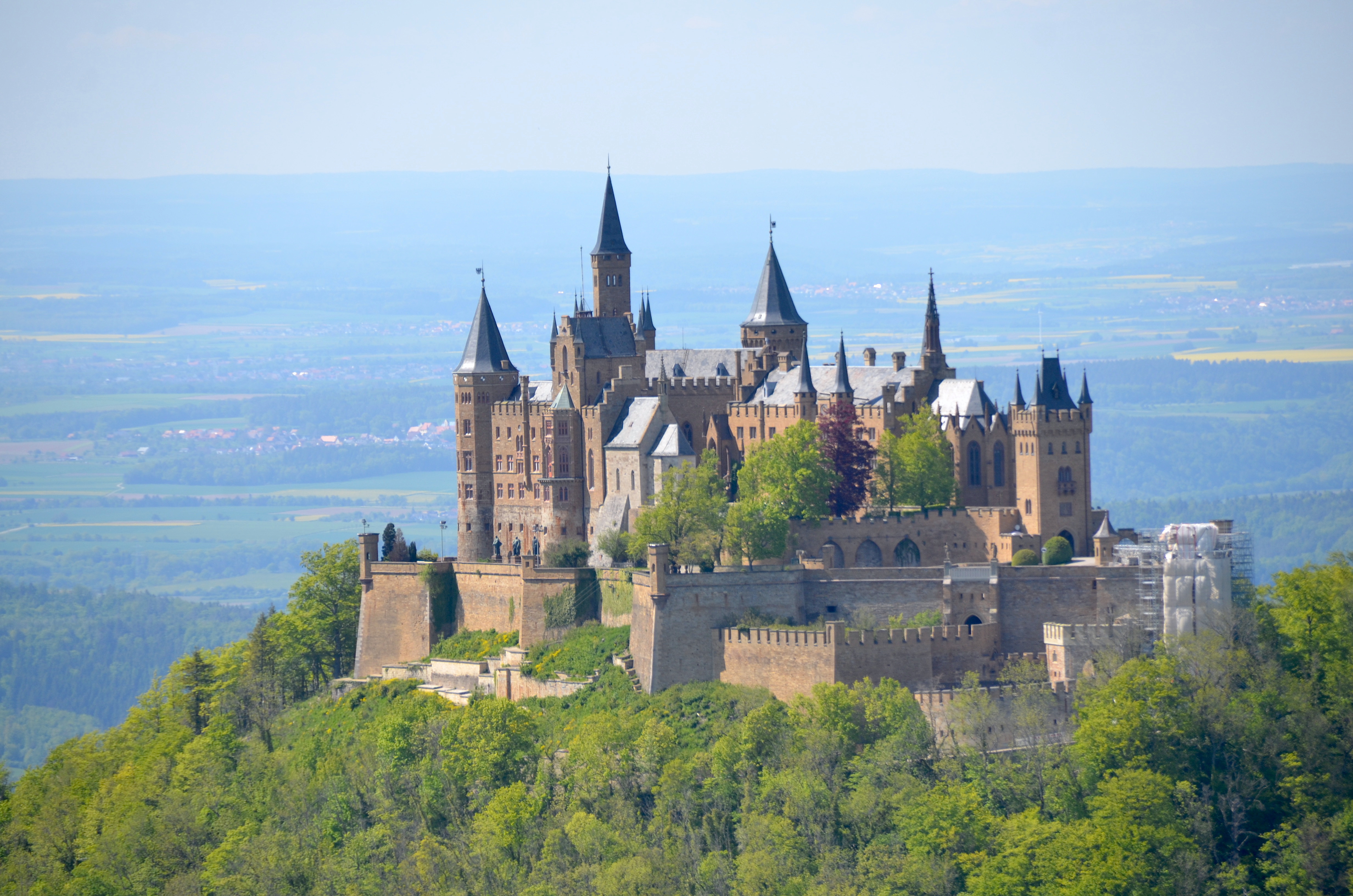
Hohenzollern Castle

=== Construction ===
==== Magic Kingdom ====
Cinderella Castle was completed in July 1971, after about 18 months of construction. The castle is 183 feet (56 m) tall, as measured from water-level. By adding the depth of the moat, 6 feet (1.8 m) at the bridge, it totals 189 feet (58 m).

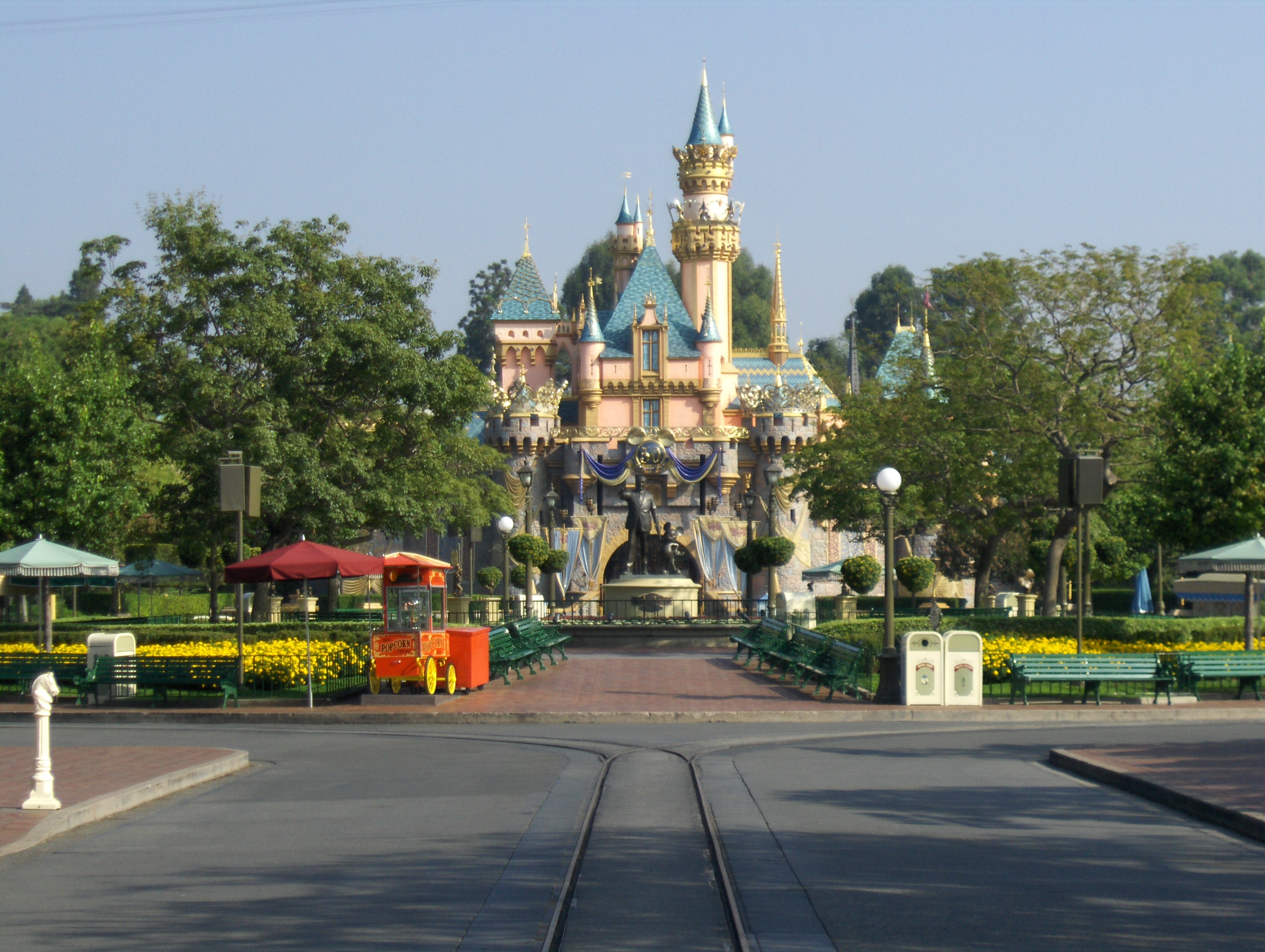
Sleeping Beauty Castle from Disneyland

Cinderella Castle is more than 100 feet (30 m) taller than Sleeping Beauty Castle at Disneyland in Anaheim, California. The set-building trick of forced perspective makes the castle appear larger than it is. At higher elevations, its proportions to full scale are reduced for elements such as stones, windows, and doors. This castle and its near-twin in Tokyo were the tallest Disney theme park castles until the completion of the Enchanted Storybook Castle at Shanghai Disneyland Park.

Cinderella Castle is designed to reflect the late-Gothic, flamboyant style of the 1400s. Unlike Disneyland's castle, no gold is used on the exterior; all gold colors are anodized aluminum. Despite its appearance, no bricks were used in its construction; the inner structure consists of six hundred tons of steel-braced frame construction, with a 10-inch-thick (250 mm) reinforced concrete wall encircling the structure to the full height of the outermost stone-like walls. All of the steel and concrete works are supported on a concrete drilled caisson foundation. Much less fiberglass is used than is popularly believed. Rather, most of the exterior is a thick, very hard fiber-reinforced gypsum plaster that is supported by light-gauge metal studs. Most fiberglass work is reserved for the exterior walls of more ornate upper towers. The roofs are not fiberglass, either. They are shingled in the same type of plastic that computer monitor shells are made from, attached to a cone of light gauge steel sheeting over the steel sub-frame. These towers were lifted by crane, then welded and bolted permanently to the main structure. Contrary to a popular legend, the castle cannot be taken apart or moved in any way in the event of a hurricane. It would take months to disassemble, it would be too dangerous to operate the 300-foot (91 m) crane required in windy conditions, and there would have to be a more structurally sound building to keep it in. As with every other building at Walt Disney World, it was simply efficient enough in design to handle a hurricane. It can easily withstand the 125 mph (200 km/h) wind speeds in Central Florida.

Cinderella Castle is also surrounded by a moat, which contains approximately 3.37 million US gallons (12,800 m^{3}) of water; however, unlike the drawbridge at Sleeping Beauty Castle in Disneyland, Cinderella Castle cannot raise its bridge. There are a total of 27 towers on the castle, each numbered 1-29—tower numbers 13 and 17 were cancelled before construction when it was discovered that they could not really be seen from anywhere in the park, due mainly to the other Fantasyland buildings. The tower with the clock in front is number 10, the tallest is number 20. Number 23 is the other golden-roofed tower.

Originally, a suite was planned for the Disney family and executives, but since Walt Disney died nearly five years before the park opened, it remained unfinished, and eventually was turned successively into a telephone call center, a dressing room, and is currently a hotel room. There are three elevators inside the castle. One is for guest use and goes between the lobby of Cinderella's Royal Table and the second floor restaurant. The second is for restaurant staff use, and is located in tower 2 to the left of the drawbridge. It has landings in the Utilidors, the mezzanine level in a break room, and on the second floor in the kitchen. The third elevator is in tower 20, and services the Utilidors, the breezeway, the kitchen of Cinderella's Royal Table, and the Cinderella Castle Suite. The suite is about 30 feet (9.1 m) below the level where the zipline cable that Tinker Bell "flies" on for the fireworks show is attached to tower 20. Access to the cable is by ladder. From January 2007 to December 2009 the suite was used as a prize for the Disney Dreams Giveaway at the Walt Disney World Resort during the Year of a Million Dreams/35th anniversary celebration.

Cinderella Castle was designed so that it was tall enough to be seen from the Seven Seas Lagoon in front of the Magic Kingdom, where many guests took ferries from the parking lot to the gates of the park. In theme park jargon, Cinderella Castle was conceived as the primary "weenie" (a term commonly used by Walt and his Imagineers) that draws new entering guests through Main Street, U.S.A. towards the central hub, from where all other areas can be reached.

On February 17, 2020, in honor of the 70th anniversary of the release of the 1950 Disney animated film Cinderella, Disney announced the castle will be getting repainted within the spring & summer 2020 with dark blue roofs, a slight rose pink color, and will have many gold trim accents on the castle, along with darker stone similar to Disneyland's Sleeping Beauty Castle. Disney has assured that the castle will still be fully visible while the work is on going, and the fireworks shows will continue. However, COVID-19 forced the park to close from March to July 2020 so most of the work was done when the park closed. The paint job was completed in July 2020 shortly after the reopening of Walt Disney World. Originally, the tower spires were painted a bluish-purple, but were painted back to royal blue in Spring 2021 as Disney began installing the 50th anniversary decorations on the Castle.

As of late Spring 2021, Cinderella Castle has been decorated with what Disney calls "EARidescent" gold and blue bunting, ribbons and other decorations. Cinderella Castle was fully decorated with these through April 2, 2023 when the decorations began to be removed in phases following the end of "The World's Most Magical Celebration". In August 2025 at Destination D23, it was announced that Cinderella Castle will be restored to the classic colors. In December 2025, it was announced that Cinderella Castle would be repainted starting in January 2026.

==== Tokyo Disneyland ====
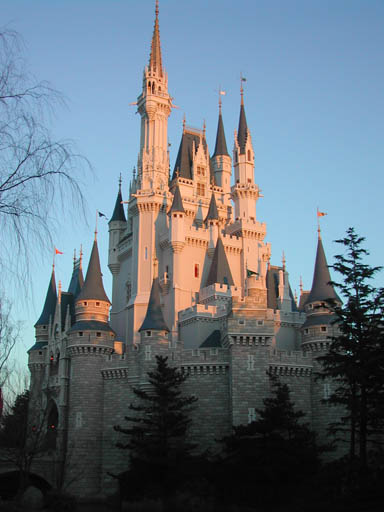
The old color scheme of Cinderella Castle from Tokyo Disneyland

In general, Cinderella Castle by Tokyo Disneyland has a near identical appearance to the castle from the Magic Kingdom. However, it has a different color scheme and is slightly shorter, standing at 51 metres (167 ft).

From 1986 to 2006, the castle hosted a walk-through attraction called the Cinderella Castle Mystery Tour; centered primarily on Disney villains (particularly the Horned King from The Black Cauldron), this was one of Tokyo Disneyland's first unique attractions, and the longest-lasting. In June 2006, the castle was repainted to differentiate it from Cinderella Castle at Magic Kingdom. The castle now has gold trimmings, the rooftops have been painted a different shade of blue, and the white stone of the turrets now has a tan/dirty-pink color.

In 2018, Tokyo Disneyland's Cinderella Castle received water fountains installed for a new nighttime presentation Celebrate! Tokyo Disneyland which premiered on July 10, as part of its 35th Anniversary celebration.

=== Special decorations ===
Cinderella Castle has been temporarily re-decorated on a few occasions.

==== Magic Kingdom ====
1. To commemorate the 25th anniversary of Walt Disney World Resort on October 1, 1996, Imagineers transformed the front of Cinderella Castle into an 18-story "birthday cake." Complete with red and pink "icing," giant candy canes and 26 glowing candles, the castle served as the centerpiece for the 15-month-long celebration. Designed by Walt Disney Entertainment Florida and later constructed by the Imagineers, this was no small undertaking. It took more than 400 US gallons (1,500 L) of pink paint to cover the castle, which was decorated with multicolored "sprinkles," 26 candles, ranging in height from 20 to 40 feet (6.1–12.2 m) tall, 16 two-foot (61 cm) long candy stars, 16 five-foot (1.5 m) candy bears, 12 five-foot (1.5 m) gumdrops, four six-foot (1.8 m) stacks of Life Savers, 30 three-foot (91 cm) lollipops, and 50 two-foot (61 cm) gumballs. Additionally, more than 1000 feet (305 m) of pink and blue inflatable "icing" was needed to finish it off. On January 31, 1998, the castle was transformed back to its original state.
2. On November 16, 2004, the castle was modified to appear as though it was strewn with toilet paper, and Stitch is King was posted on a turret as faux graffiti to mark the grand opening of Stitch's Great Escape! that day. The material was removed after the park closed that evening.
3. To celebrate the Happiest Celebration on Earth in honor of Disneyland's 50th anniversary and was formally unveiled on May 5, 2005. The castle's exterior was adorned with polished gold trim and accents, swags, banners and tapestries. Golden statues of Disney animated characters were also added to the exterior, including Peter Pan, Tinker Bell, and Wendy Darling circling the tallest spire. Other statues included Kaa and King Louie from The Jungle Book, Simba, Timon, and Pumbaa from The Lion King, Sebastian and Flounder from The Little Mermaid, the Cheshire Cat and White Rabbit from Alice in Wonderland, and Victor, Hugo and Laverne from The Hunchback of Notre Dame. Just above the front archway sat an enormous "stained-glass" mirror modeled after the magic mirror in Snow White and the Seven Dwarfs. The mirror changed images every 40 seconds to feature each Disney castle and the year its park opened: Disneyland, 1955; the Magic Kingdom, 1971; Tokyo Disneyland, 1983; Disneyland Resort Paris, 1992; and Hong Kong Disneyland, 2005. The decorations were removed in late September 2006.
4. The castle's most recent redecoration was to celebrate Walt Disney World's 50th anniversary, known as "The World's Most Magical Celebration", which began on October 1, 2021, and lasted through March 31, 2023. The design was first revealed on February 19, 2021, with most of the decorations being installed from March 11 to April 16, 2021. The "EARidescent" pieces, as Disney refers to them, include gold detailing, royal blue jewels, shimmering pearls, draping and ribbons on the castle's turrets. The final decoration is a giant 50th crest that covers the clock on the front face of the castle, which was installed the night of July 22, 2021. The decorations began to be removed the night of April 2, 2023 following the final performance of Disney Enchantment with the removal of the 50th crest, and the last was removed the night of May 22, 2023.
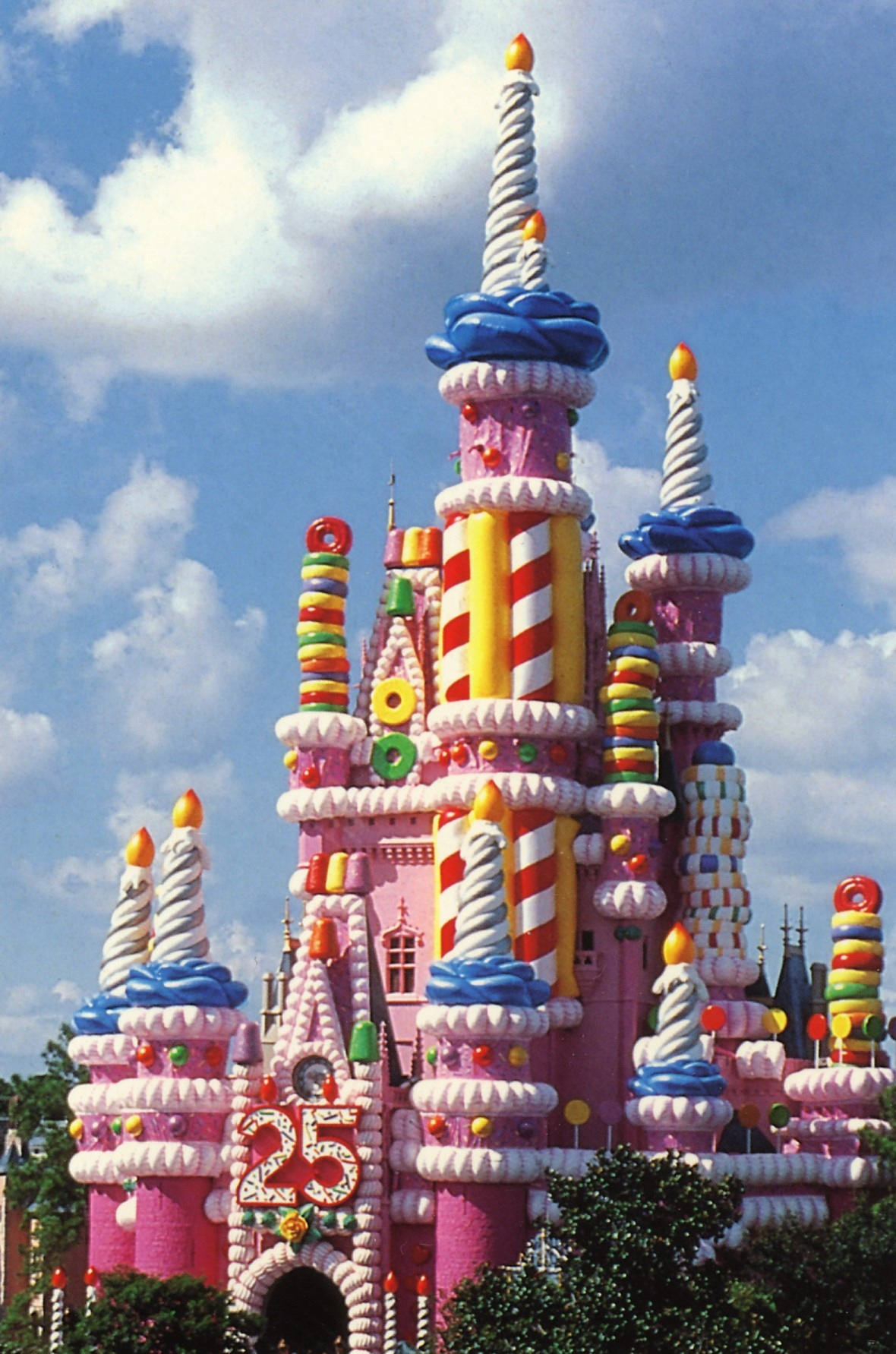
For Walt Disney World's 25th anniversary celebration, c. 1996

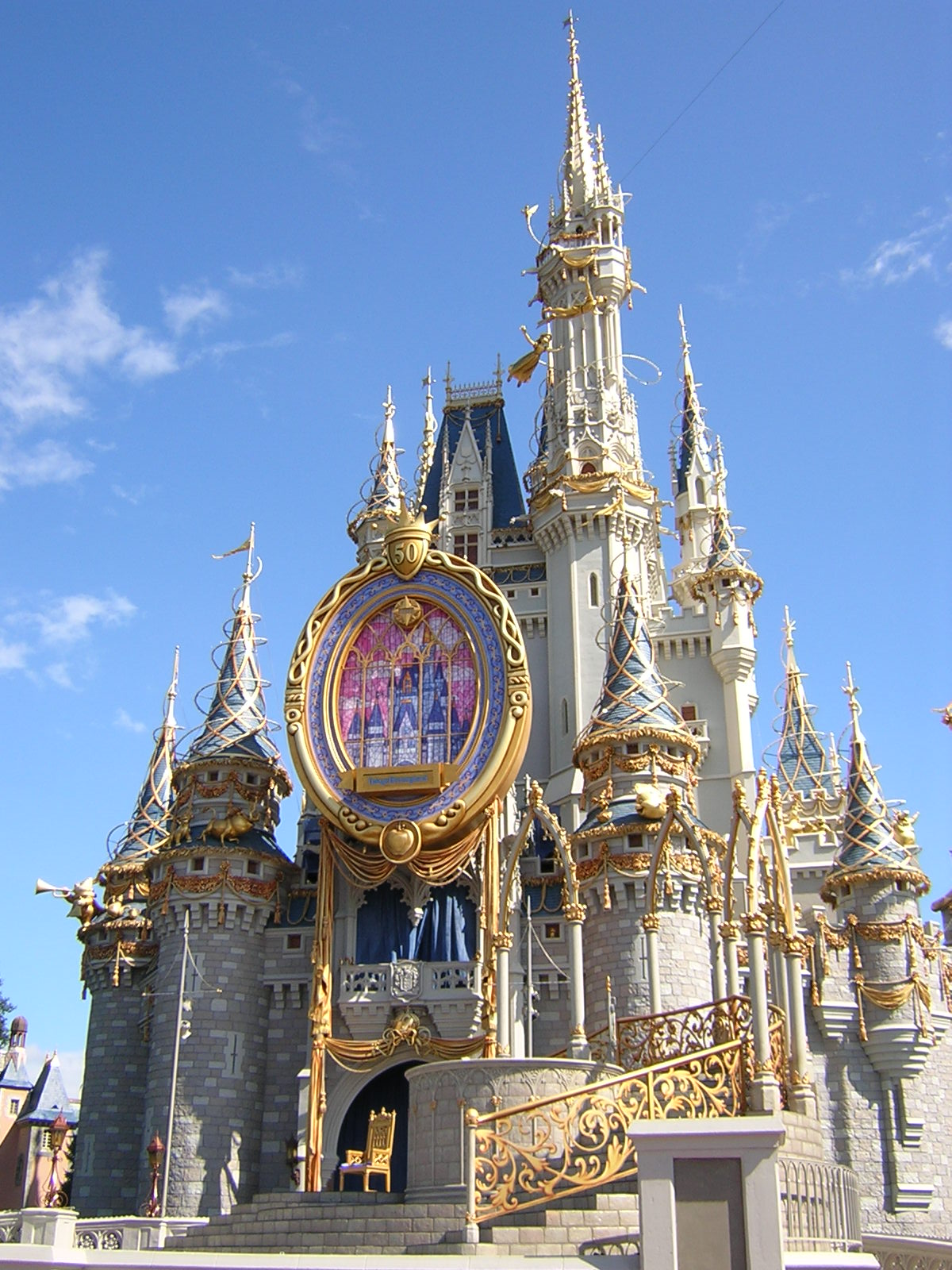
For the Happiest Celebration on Earth

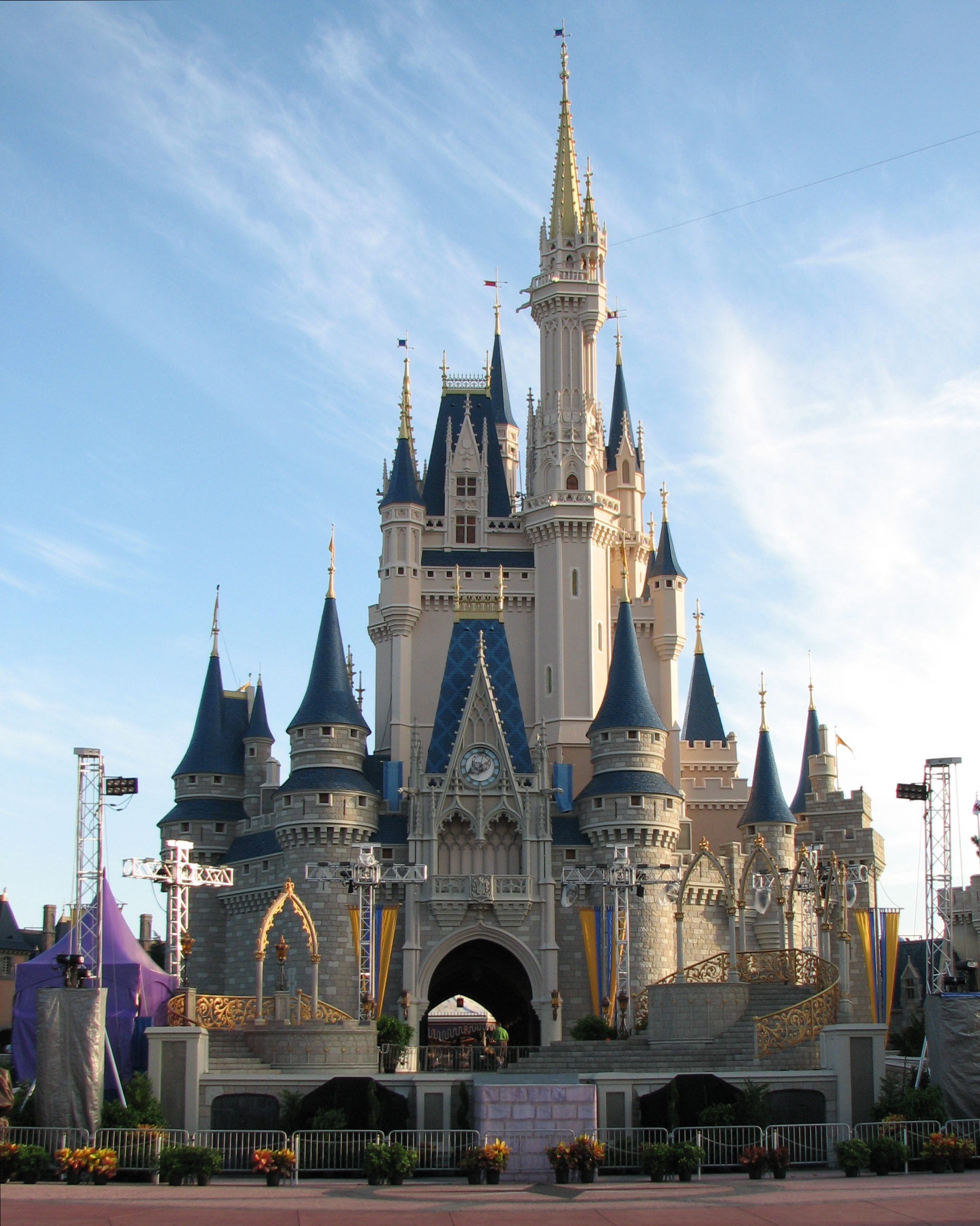
Cinderella Castle during Grad Nite 2007, a Disney World tradition that ended in 2011

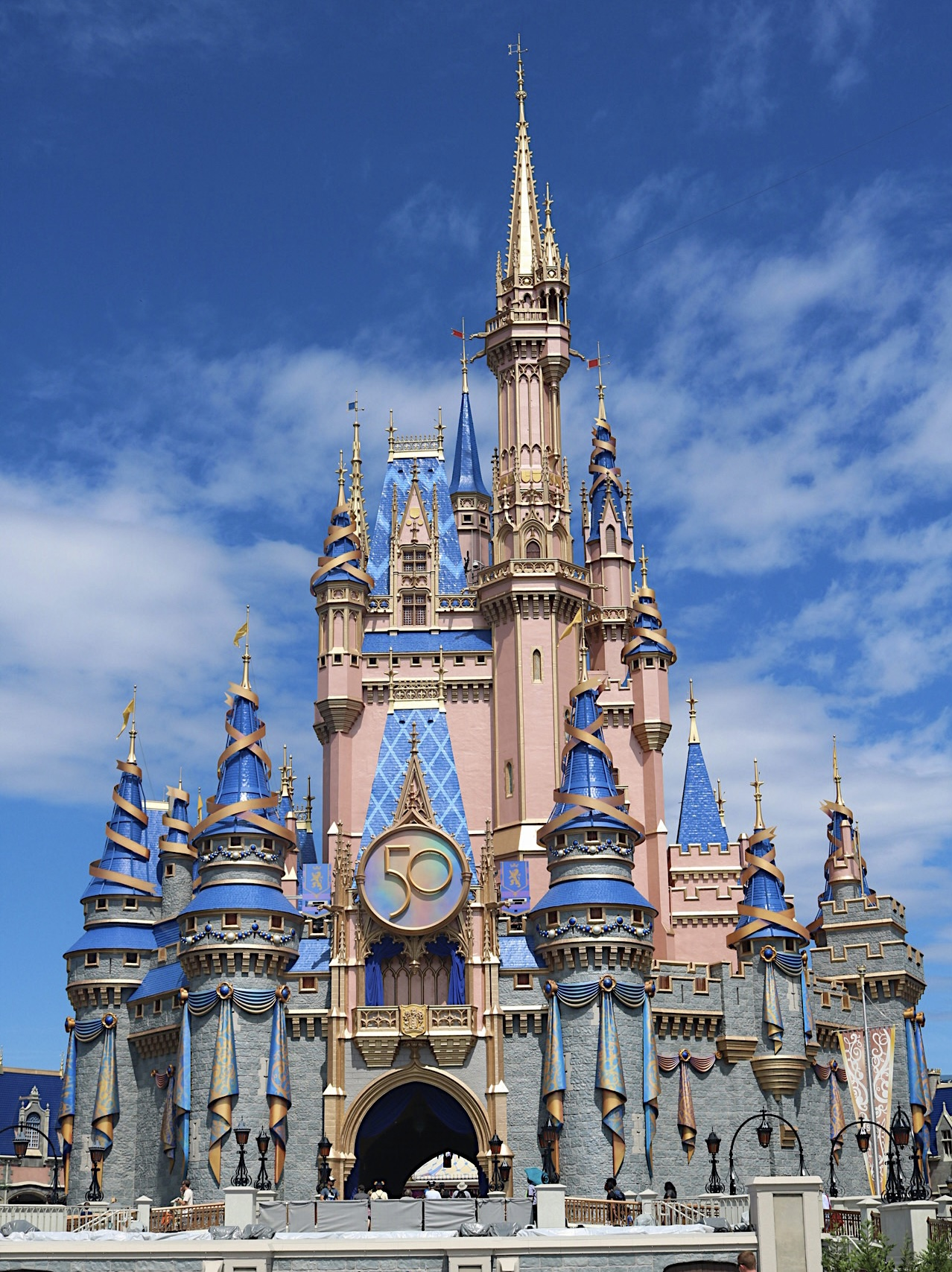
For Walt Disney World's 50th anniversary celebration, 2021

==== Tokyo Disneyland ====
1. As part of the 25th anniversary of Tokyo Disneyland on April 15, 2008, the castle received decorations similar to the 2021 50th anniversary WDW castle with only the 2 turrets decorated in purple and white banners and gold/sliver ribbons on the rooftops. The 25th crest was hung lower on the balcony railing instead of the clock itself.
2. During the 30th anniversary, the castle was decorated to feature mickey balloons and ribbons and spirals. The 30th crest was located in the same location of where the 25th crest was located.
3. The castle's most recent redecoration is to celebrate Tokyo Disneyland's 40th anniversary, which began on April 15, 2023. This included banners on the walls of the 2 front turrets of the castle. the 40th crest was in the same location just like the past celebrations. The decorations were removed from April 1–8, 2024.
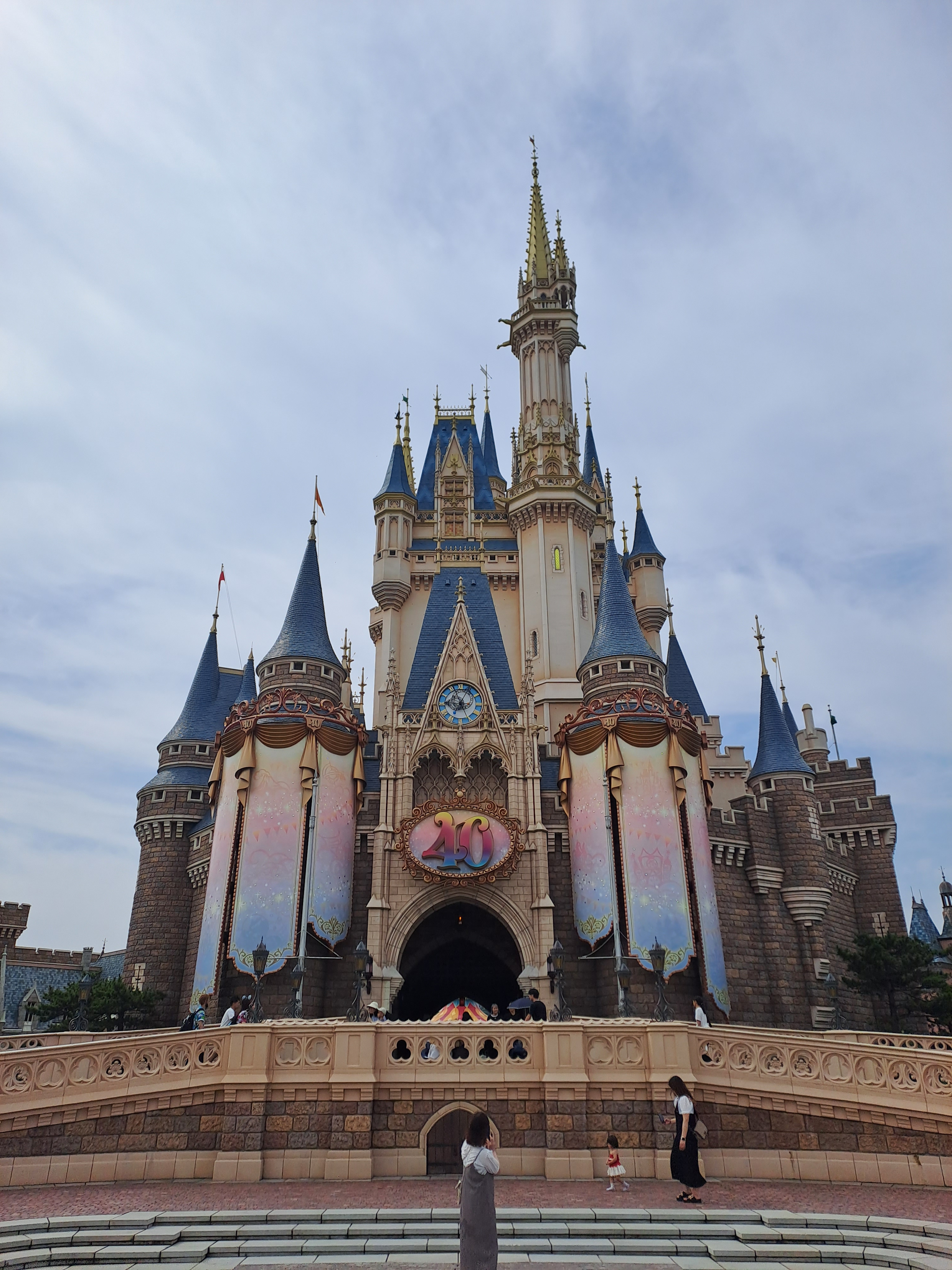
For Tokyo Disneyland's 40th anniversary, 2023

=== At night ===
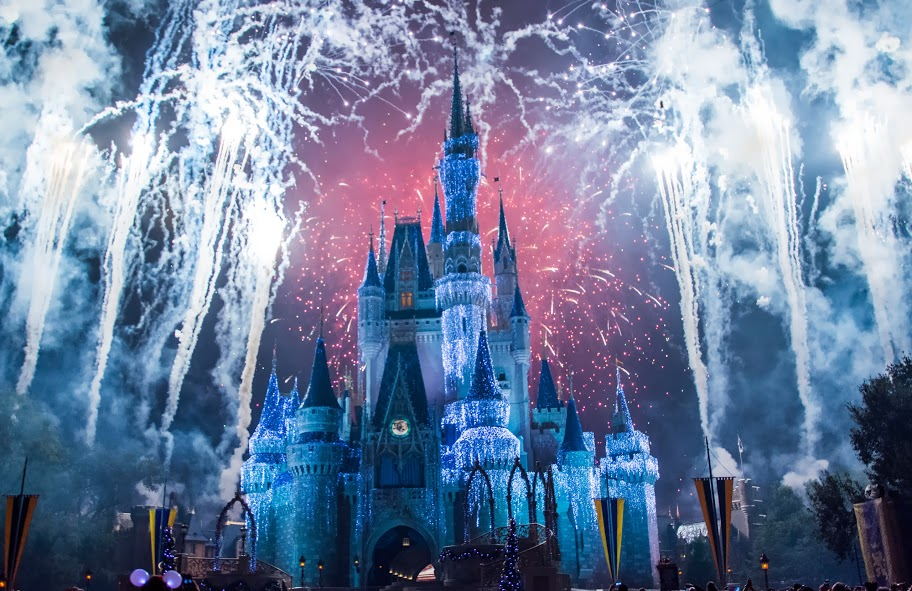
Fireworks surround Cinderella Castle, dressed for Winter (December 2013)

When the sun sets, the castle is illuminated by SGM Palco LED lighting fixtures placed on different castle levels and surrounding areas, providing an effective range of 16.7 million colors. The castle itself plays a role in the Magic Kingdom's former fireworks show, Wishes: A Magical Gathering of Disney Dreams, in which it changes color in synchronization with the dramatic music of the display. The same color changing and effects occurs for the other fireworks shows: HalloWishes (in Mickey's Not-So-Scary Halloween Party); Magic, Music and Mayhem (during Disney's Pirate and Princess Party); and the Christmas fireworks show Holiday Wishes during Mickey's Very Merry Christmas Party. The castle's projection mapping technology has been used in several night events, such as their current fireworks spectacular, Happily Ever After, and its predecessor, Disney Enchantment. During the holiday seasons, various shows have utilized projection mapping, including Hocus Pocus Villain Spelltacular, along with the Halloween themed Disney's Not-So-Spooky Spectacular and Holiday overlaid show, Minnie's Wonderful Christmastime Fireworks.

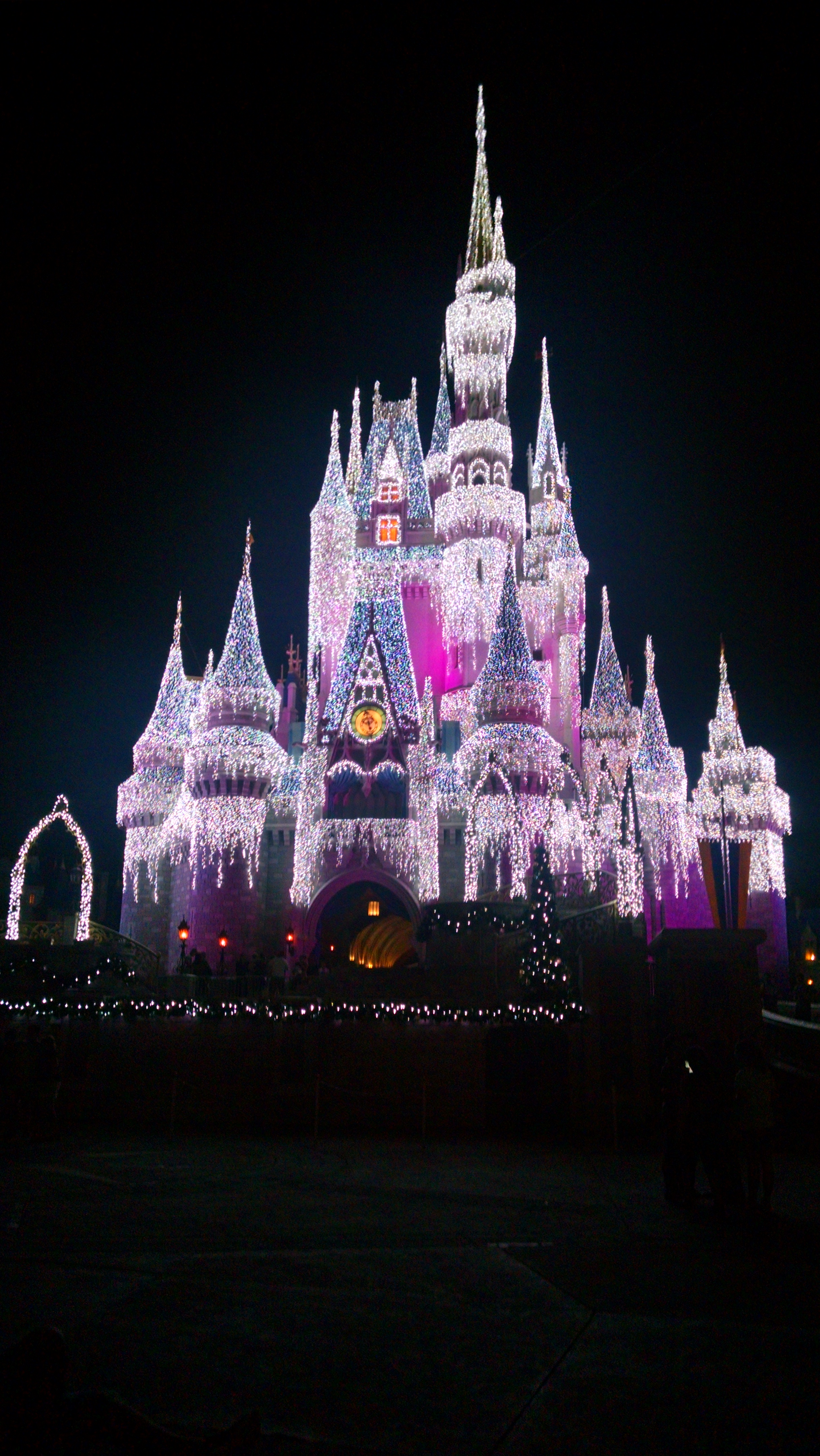
Castle with Christmas lights on it for the Christmas season (November 2014)

At the park's closing, the nightly "Kiss Goodnight" was performed, in which Roy O. Disney's dedication speech for the Magic Kingdom is played throughout the park accompanied by Disney music which changes with the colors of the castle. Even when the park closes before 11pm (23:00), the show is performed a second time at 11pm (23:00), providing entertainment for guests of Disney resort hotels bordering the Seven Seas Lagoon. This practice seems to have ended in 2020 after the park reopened from COVID-19. Beginning November 2007, for the first time, the "Castle Dream Lights", with over 200,000 LED Christmas lights (as Disneyland Paris has since 2004), covered Cinderella Castle and was lit nightly during a stage show in front of the castle. The last showing was in 2019 whereas it never returned once again starting in 2020.

=== The Magic, the Memories and You ===
The Magic, the Memories and You

Magic Kingdom
- Area: Cinderella Castle
- Status: Closed
- Opening date: January 18, 2011
- Closing date: September 3, 2012
- Replaced by: Celebrate the Magic

Disneyland
- Area: It's a Small World
- Status: Closed
- Opening date: January 18, 2011
- Closing date: September 3, 2012
- Replaced by: Disneyland Forever

Ride statistics
- Attraction type: Multimedia and pyrotechnic show
- Designer: Walt Disney Creative Entertainment
- Theme: Iconic moments from Disney films Disney Parks Memories
- Music: Let The Memories Begin
- Duration: 9–10 minutes
- Wheelchair accessible

On January 18, 2011, a nighttime projection mapping show premiered at Cinderella Castle at Walt Disney World. The show featured photographs and videos of park guests, taken by Disney's PhotoPass employees, combined with projections of Disney characters and attractions and pre-selected music. The Magic, the Memories and You show was presented before and after the nightly Wishes fireworks show at Magic Kingdom, as well as presented before and after Disneyland's regular nightly fireworks, and was part of Disney's "Let the Memories Begin" campaign for 2011 as well as Disney World's 40th Anniversary celebrations that same year. A parallel show existed at Disneyland, at the Disneyland Resort, taking place at the facade of It's a Small World. On September 3, this show ended its run and was replaced by a similar nighttime multimedia show, Celebrate the Magic, in 2012 and again by Once Upon a Time in Fall 2016.

The Magic, The Memories and You also inspired the similar theme song for Celebrate! Tokyo Disneyland as part of the Tokyo Disney Resort's 35th Anniversary celebration that premiered at Tokyo Disneyland on July 10, 2018, which was created as a tribute to both the former nighttime projection show and Remember... Dreams Come True.

At Disneyland, the show was replaced with Disneyland Forever in 2015, a similar show now featuring projections at Sleeping Beauty Castle and Main Street, USA in addition to the facade of It's a Small World.

== Interior ==
=== Mosaics ===
Inside the castle's archway, a series of five mosaic murals tells the story of Cinderella. Designed by Imagineer Dorothea Redmond and crafted and set in place by a team of six artists led by mosaicist Hanns-Joachim Scharff, the 15-by-10-foot (4.6 by 3.0 m) ornate panels are shaped in a Gothic arch. The murals took 22 months to complete and contain just over 300,000 pieces of Italian glass and rough smalti (glass made specifically for mosaics traditionally used by Italian craftsmen) in more than 500 colors. Many of the hand-cut tiles are fused with sterling silver and 14-karat (58 percent) gold, and some are as small as the head of a tack. Looking closely at these ornate murals, one will notice that each of Cinderella's wicked stepsisters appears with a little added color—one sister's face is clearly "red with anger", while the other is a little "green with envy" as they watch Cinderella try on the glass slipper.

=== Bibbidi Bobbidi Boutique ===
As of September 10, 2007, the castle is home to the Bibbidi Bobbidi Boutique, first introduced at Disney Springs (formerly known as Downtown Disney). Inside, guests can receive a so-called "princess transformation", which features a Disney Princess makeover, one of three hairstyles, a manicure, a sash, and/or a gown, tiara, wand and shoes.

The King's Gallery, the former gift shop in this space, has moved to the Main Street Cinema on Main Street, U.S.A.

=== Cinderella Castle Suite ===
Inside the upper levels of Cinderella Castle, there is a suite. This space is not large, and can be compared to the size of a master bedroom and bathroom in an average house. The location of the suite can be identified from the outside by locating the stained glass windows with pictures in the center on the north and east sides of the castle room on the 4th floor, about 2/3 of the way up. The glass used contains many small, multi-faceted pieces, which slightly obscures the view of the park with fireworks show from inside the suite and added music. The suite adjoins a sizable exterior balcony on the east side. The walls around this balcony are about 5 feet (1.5 m) high. This balcony affords views to the north, east, and south. The balcony is only accessible through an emergency exit and is not a guest area.

On June 7, 2005, Disney announced that the suite would be completely decorated and upholstered as a 'royal bedchamber', which can sleep up to six people. It was available as a prize during the Year of a Million Dreams (2007) celebration taking place at all eleven Disney theme parks, and an overnight stay in the apartment was a prize randomly awarded to a guest at the four Walt Disney World theme parks and Downtown Disney. Disney Parks management have discontinued the offer of spending the night in the castle as of 2009.

=== Cinderella's Royal Table ===
Cinderella's Royal Table, formerly known as King Stefan's Banquet Hall, is a restaurant inside the castle. Located on the second floor, guests can take the circular stairway or the elevator to the restaurant, where children are referred to as princes and princesses, while the adults in the party are referred to as lords and ladies. Walt Disney Imagineers had originally wanted to give the restaurant a regal name, and since there are no well-known characters from "Cinderella" that met their criteria, they instead took a little dramatic license and chose the name of Sleeping Beauty's father, King Stefan. The name was changed on April 28, 1997, in order not to confuse tourists. The restaurant is decorated not only with a number of stained glass windows and medieval objects, but with more than forty coats of arms. Each of these is an actual family seal, and represent some of the many people that played a major role in the design and construction of Walt Disney World, including Roger Broggie Sr. (Imagineer and railroad aficionado who aided in the design of many attractions), Marc Davis (animator and theme park designer), Roy O. Disney (Walt's brother), John Hench (who designed the castle), Diane Disney Miller (Walt's daughter), Dick Nunis (former Chairman of Walt Disney Attractions), and Marty Sklar (Imagineering vice chairman and principal creative executive who worked alongside Walt Disney).

Cinderella's Royal Table is also the location of "Fairytale Dining at Cinderella's Royal Table." At breakfast, lunch and dinner Cinderella greets all guests in the castle foyer, and during the meal Disney princesses such as Ariel, Aurora, Jasmine, Snow White, and sometimes Rapunzel circulate among the tables.

=== Cinderella's Fairy Tale Hall (Tokyo Disneyland) ===
Cinderella's Fairy Tale Hall is a walk-through attraction located inside Cinderella Castle by Tokyo Disneyland. Cinderella, wanting to share her magical princess story, decided to open up the castle even during her absence and exhibit various artworks that show scenes from her story. At the lobby and corridor, guests will find eight murals showing how Cinderella changed from beloved daughter, to servant girl, and then to Princess. They will also see a diorama of Cinderella magically transformed into wearing a beautiful ball gown, and other artworks made from various materials such as paper, wood and glass. In the Grand Hall guests will find a magnificent chandelier, the renowned glass slipper, a throne, and special paintings that reveal a magical message when photographed using a flash.

=== Flight regulations (Walt Disney World) ===
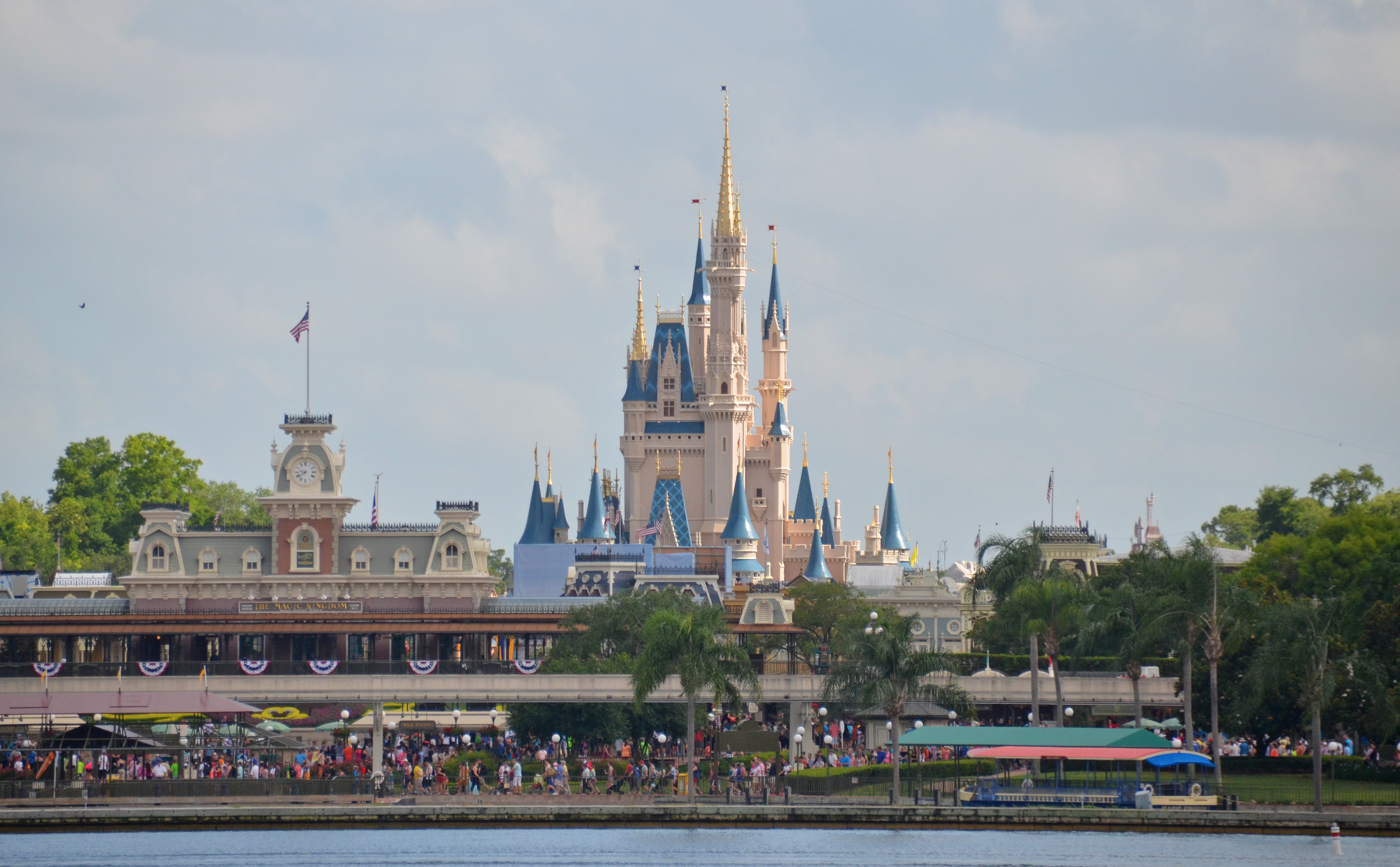
Cinderella Castle uses forced perspective to appear taller than its actual height of 183 ft (58 m).

By keeping the height of the castle's spire under 200 feet (61 m) tall, the castle at Walt Disney World was able to avoid Federal Aviation Administration (FAA) regulations that would require flashing aircraft warning lights at the top. The two taller attractions at Walt Disney World, The Twilight Zone Tower of Terror and Expedition Everest, top out at 199 and 199.5 feet, respectively, to avoid this requirement as well.

As a result of the September 11, 2001 attacks, amid concerns that general aviation could pose a threat to public safety, the FAA placed a permanent Temporary Flight Restriction (TFR) over the entire Walt Disney World Resort in Orlando, Florida. The flight restriction extends outward from an island near the Contemporary Resort (28°24′45″N 81°34′20″W) at a radius of 3 nautical miles (5.6 km; 3.5 mi) up to 3,000 feet (910 m) above the ground level surface. Cinderella Castle is used as a visual reference. It has been a common growing legend that Disney chose to prohibit aviation above the park in order to make visitors feel even further separate from the outside world, but the true reason was, in fact, in response to the September 11th attacks. Law enforcement and Walt Disney World Cessna 172 aircraft, however, are exempt from this TFR.

== Logo usage ==
As Cinderella Castle is a Disney icon and Walt Disney World was gaining more popularity, it replaced Sleeping Beauty Castle in the opening of the Walt Disney anthology series starting in the late 1970s. Since 2006, both castles were combined to form the logo of Walt Disney Pictures, Walt Disney Television, Disney Music Group and Walt Disney Studios Motion Pictures. The logo is now featured on the Wonderful World of Disney on ABC, formerly shown on the Disney Channel.

== See also ==
- Sleeping Beauty Castle at Disneyland
- Le Château de la Belle au Bois Dormant at Disneyland Paris
- Castle of Magical Dreams at Hong Kong Disneyland
- Enchanted Storybook Castle at Shanghai Disneyland
- List of Magic Kingdom attractions
- List of Tokyo Disneyland attractions
