= Once Upon a Time (Disney parks) =

Nighttime spectacular

Tokyo Disneyland
- Area: Cinderella Castle
- Status: Removed
- Soft opening date: May 26, 2014
- Opening date: May 29, 2014
- Closing date: November 6, 2017
- Replaced: Disney Magic in the Sky
- Replaced by: Celebrate! Tokyo Disneyland

Magic Kingdom
- Name: Once Upon A Time: Where Stories Take You Anywhere
- Area: Cinderella Castle
- Status: Removed
- Opening date: November 4, 2016
- Closing date: March 16, 2020
- Replaced: Celebrate the Magic
- Replaced by: Happily Ever After

Ride statistics
- Attraction type: Multimedia and pyrotechnic show
- Designer: Walt Disney Creative Entertainment
- Theme: Iconic moments from Disney's animated films
- Duration: 19 minutes (Tokyo Disneyland version); 14:30 minutes (Magic Kingdom version)
- Languages: Japanese (Tokyo Disneyland version); English (Magic Kingdom/Tokyo Disneyland version)
- Sponsor: Disney+ (Florida)
- Wheelchair accessible

Once Upon a Time was a nighttime spectacular at Magic Kingdom, which was originally known in Magic Kingdom as its full name, Once Upon A Time: Where Stories Take You Anywhere and formerly at Tokyo Disneyland. Similar to Celebrate the Magic and Disney Dreams!, the Tokyo show premiered on May 29, 2014, and utilizes fireworks, lasers, fire, projection mapping, and searchlights during the 19-minute presentation. The Magic Kingdom version is shorter and utilizes less pyrotechnics and no fire.

== History ==
=== Tokyo Disneyland ===
In October 2013, Tokyo Disney Resort announced that Once Upon a Time, a new nighttime entertainment at Tokyo Disneyland, would premiere on May 29, 2014. This nighttime entertainment uses projection mapping technology to produce a three-dimensional effect by projecting images in a way that fits the contours of buildings and other structures. This is the first time for this technology to be used in an entertainment program at Tokyo Disney Resort.

The show soft opened on May 26, 2014. Due to inclement weather that evening, a majority of the fireworks were not produced. The show also had performances on May 27 and 28 before the actual opening date.

To avoid overcrowding problems, the show features ticket systems for special viewing areas.

==== Frozen edition ====
On January 13, 2015, Tokyo Disneyland presented a winter event called Anna and Elsa's Frozen Fantasy. During the period, Once Upon A Time features a special winter edition, featuring the scenes and songs of Frozen, replacing Snow White and Winnie The Pooh scenes, including "For The First Time In Forever" and "Let It Go". The event ended on March 20, 2015 and will be held again in winter 2016. Although the event ended, the show was over popular. Therefore, the park decided to extend the show's ending date til July 5, 2015. After that, the original show will still continue. After Frozen Forever, Frozen-specific projection show, premiered in 2017, this segment become exclusively to Magic Kingdom version.

=== Magic Kingdom ===
On October 26, 2016, it was announced that the show would be coming to Walt Disney World's Magic Kingdom on November 4, 2016, replacing the previous projection mapping show on Cinderella Castle, Celebrate the Magic.

Magic Kingdom version had some difference from Tokyo Disneyland version because they only used minimized use of fire, fireworks and more searchlights, although lasers was added in June 2017. This version only ran 14:30 minutes and excluding Snow White and Tangled scenes, and replace them with Frozen scene from special winter version.

The Magic Kingdom version was regarded mainly as a light projection show which projects scenes and characters from Beauty and the Beast, Frozen, Cinderella, Peter Pan, and Alice in Wonderland onto the Cinderella Castle. The show did not return after the COVID-19 pandemic and its website now redirects to a generic entertainment page.

== Show summary ==
Hosted by Mrs. Potts, the show was framed as her telling bedtime stories to Chip, including sequences showcasing Alice in Wonderland, Tangled, Cinderella, Peter Pan, Snow White and the Seven Dwarfs, The Many Adventures of Winnie the Pooh, and finally Beauty and the Beast which culminated in the battle between Gaston and Beast fighting out on the castle itself and Beast's transformation back into the Prince kicking off the finale. The finale montage included brief appearances by characters from Frozen, Aladdin and The Lion King.

== Show scenes ==
- Opening
  “Tell me a story!” Chip asks his mother and Mrs. Potts begins to tell stories that begin with “Once upon a time...” As she speaks, the pages of the towering storybook change to show scenes from various Disney stories.
  - Song: “Once Upon a Time.”
- Alice in Wonderland
  Alice finds herself in Wonderland as she runs after the White Rabbit. There she's chased by the Card Soldiers of the Queen of Hearts and meets the Mad Hatter and his pals at a whimsical tea party.
  - Songs: “Alice in Wonderland (Tokyo version only),” “I'm Late,” and “A Very Merry Unbirthday (The Unbirthday Song) (Tokyo version only)”
- Tangled (Tokyo version only)
  Cinderella Castle is wrapped up in the magical golden flower as Rapunzel and Flynn Rider gaze at the starry sky from their boat. Lanterns then float up into the night.
  - Songs: “I See the Light”
- Cinderella
  Appearing before Cinderella as she weeps, her Fairy Godmother casts a magical spell. The little birds and mice help make her dress. And she dances gracefully with Prince Charming.
  - Songs: “Bibbidi-Bobbidi-Boo,” and “So This Is Love”
- Peter Pan
  Peter Pan, Tinker Bell and the Darling children, Wendy, John and Michael fly through the night sky over London as Big Ben tolls on their way to Never Land.
  - Song: “You Can Fly!”
- Snow White and the Seven Dwarfs (Tokyo version only)
  In a cottage deep in the woods, the Seven Dwarfs are cheerfully dancing with Snow White. When Dopey sneezes, the cottage seems to collapse, falling towards the audience.
  - Song: “The Silly Song (The Dwarfs Yodel Song)”
- The Many Adventures of Winnie the Pooh
  Winnie the Pooh is hanging onto a balloon as the wind blows him around the Hundred Acre Wood. He ends up in a dream.
  - Song: "Rumbly in my Tumbly," and “Heffalumps and Woozles”
- Frozen (Florida version, special winter edition only in Tokyo)
  Arendelle is celebrating Elsa's coronation. Anna is so excited as she sings "For The First Time In Forever". Then Elsa escapes to the North Mountain to "Let It Go". The sequence ends after Olaf gives Sven his carrot nose while riding him.
  - Songs: "For the First Time in Forever", "Let It Go"
- Beauty and the Beast
  Belle and the Beast are waltzing, when the scene changes to the duel with Gaston. Gaston dies by falling from the top of the castle. After he dies, the hell fire explodes. What follows is the joyful moment when the Beast is transformed back into his human form.
  - Songs: “Beauty and the Beast” and “The Mob Song,”
- Finale
  As Mrs. Potts and Chip say together, “And they lived happily ever after,” the performance reaches its grand finale. During the grand finale, various characters from Frozen (Frozen 2 in The Golden Anniversary of Walt Disney World variant) and Lion King (Winnie the Pooh in Florida version) also appear. The show ends with an explosive hell fire.
  - Song: “Once Upon a Time”

== Music ==
Key:

- Yes – Song included
- No – Song excluded

| Music | Tokyo Disneyland (regular version) (until 2017) | Tokyo Disneyland (special winter version) (until 2016) | Magic Kingdom (regular version) (until 2020) |
|---|---|---|---|
| Once Upon A Time | Yes | Yes | Yes |
| Alice in Wonderland | Yes | Yes | No |
| I'm Late | Yes | Yes | Yes |
| A Very Merry Unbirthday (The Unbirthday Song) | Yes | Yes | No |
| I See the Light | Yes | Yes | No |
| Bibbidi-Bobbidi-Boo | Yes | Yes | Yes |
| So this is Love | Yes | Yes | Yes |
| You Can Fly | Yes | Yes | Yes |
| For the First time in Forever | No | Yes | Yes |
| Let it Go | No | Yes | Yes |
| The Silly Song (The Dwarfs Yodel Song) | Yes | No | No |
| Rumbly in my Tumbly | Yes | No | Yes |
| Heffalumps and Woozles | Yes | No | Yes |
| Beauty and the Beast | Yes | Yes | Yes |
| The Mob Song | Yes | Yes | Yes |
| Reprise of Once Upon a Time | Yes | Yes | Yes |
| Once Upon a Time (exit music) | Yes | Yes | No |

== See also ==
- Happily Ever After
