= Summer Nightastic! =

Disneyland Resort
- Status: Removed
- Opening date: June 12, 2009
- Closing date: August 15, 2010

Walt Disney World Resort
- Status: Removed
- Opening date: June 6, 2010
- Closing date: August 15, 2010

Ride statistics
- Attraction type: Seasonal event
- Theme: Summer
- Season: June–August
- Owner: Walt Disney Parks and Resorts

Summer Nightastic! was a seasonal event from Walt Disney Parks and Resorts, celebrating summer at Disneyland Resort and Walt Disney World. It was announced and started in 2009 at Disneyland Resort and had returned the next year, with the introduction at the Walt Disney World Resort. The event included special night-time events and ride operations. Disneyland Resort featured events at Disneyland and Disney California Adventure, while at Walt Disney World, events were featured at Magic Kingdom, Epcot and Disney's Hollywood Studios. The event was replaced by Disney Soundsational Summer at Disneyland, however, the fireworks were retained. The event did not return to Walt Disney World.

== Disneyland Resort ==
=== Disneyland ===
- Magical (2009–2010)
- Fantasmic! (2009–2010)
- TLT Dance Club (2009–2010)
- Pixie Hollow (2009–2010)
- Captain EO Tribute (2009–2010)

=== Disney California Adventure ===
- World of Color premiered (2010)
- Toy Story Mania (2009–2010)
- Disney's Aladdin: A Musical Spectacular (2009–2010)
- Glow Fest (2009–2010)

== Walt Disney World Resort ==
=== Magic Kingdom ===
- Main Street Electrical Parade (2010)
- Summer Nightastic Firework Spectacular (2010)

=== Disney's Hollywood Studios ===
- The Twilight Zone Tower of Terror Re-Imagined (2010)
- Rock 'n' Glow Dance Party (2010)
- Fantasmic! (2010)

=== Epcot ===
- Sounds Like Summer Concert Series (2010)
- Captain EO Tribute (2010)
