= Swan Boats (Magic Kingdom) =

Walt Disney World amusement ride

Magic Kingdom
- Area: Main Street, U.S.A.
- Coordinates: 28.418925°N 81.580308°W
- Status: Closed
- Opening date: May 20, 1973
- Closing date: August 1983

Ride statistics
- Vehicle type: Boats
- Vehicles: 12
- Riders per vehicle: 26
- Duration: 17:00
- Ride system: Natural Gas and Water Jets
- Ticket: D

Swan Boats were an attraction at the Magic Kingdom at Walt Disney World. It was in operation between May 20, 1973, till August 1983. It originally took a D ticket.

The Swan Boats officially opened in 1973 and quickly became a popular attraction at Magic Kingdom. The boats took guests on a ride around the hub of the Magic Kingdom and the Swiss Family Treehouse.

== History ==
Originally there were 12 boats when the ride opened, but this was reduced to 11 when one of the boats was converted to clean the canals. By the end of the rides operation, there were only 5 boats operating. The reason for closing was because of the cost to keep the boats running. They constantly had issues with their natural gas engines and guidance system. Originally the guidance was done with an electronic system but was changed to use water propulsion to turn the boat. Eventually the boats were removed and sold.

== See also ==
- Magic Kingdom attraction and entertainment history
