= Happily Ever After (Magic Kingdom) =

Nighttime fireworks and projection show

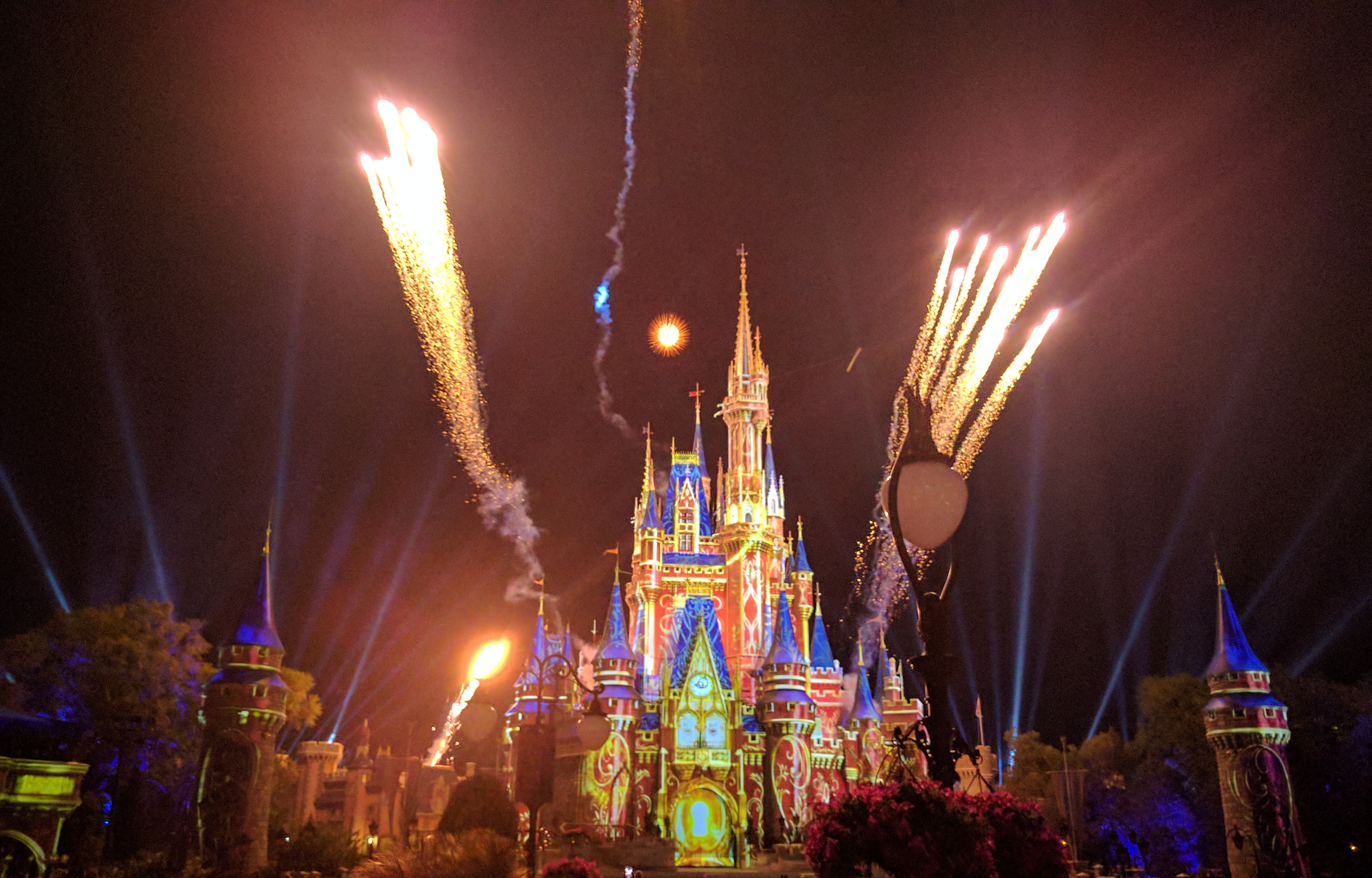

Magic Kingdom
- Area: Cinderella Castle; Main Street U.S.A.
- Status: Operating
- Soft opening date: March 14, 2023 (updated)
- Opening date: May 12, 2017 (original); April 3, 2023 (updated)
- Closing date: September 29, 2021 (original)
- Replaced: Wishes: A Magical Gathering of Disney Dreams; Disney Enchantment (updated); Once Upon a Time
- Replaced by: Disney Enchantment(original)

Ride statistics
- Attraction type: Multimedia and pyrotechnic show
- Designer: Disney Live Entertainment
- Music: "Happily Ever After" performed by Angie Keilhauer and Jordan Fisher; Score arrangement by Tim Heintz
- Duration: 18 minutes
- Sponsor: PANDORA
- Narrators: Tom Kane (2017-2026); Morgan Freeman (2027-future)
- Wheelchair accessible

Happily Ever After is a fireworks and projection mapping show which debuted at the Magic Kingdom on May 12, 2017. Unlike its predecessor, Wishes: A Magical Gathering of Disney Dreams, the show includes projection mapping, lasers, and searchlights, in addition to pyrotechnics, featuring characters from a wide array of Disney films, and music arranged by Tim Heintz. The show's theme song of the same name was written by Adam Watts, Melissa Peirce, and Andy Dodd, and performed by Angie Keilhauer and Jordan Fisher; it is adapted from Hong Kong Disneyland's 10th anniversary celebration (and its subsequent show Mickey and the Wondrous Book) and Shanghai Disneyland's Mickey's Storybook Adventure.

The show was promised to feature the most technologically advanced projection mapping display in Disney Parks history (after the introduction from ElecTRONica at Disney California Adventure). The show was replaced with Disney Enchantment for Walt Disney World's 50th anniversary celebration on September 30, 2021.

An updated version of the show, now utilizing projection mapping on the facades of Main Street, U.S.A. and new ambient sound effects in the hub and Main Street, U.S.A. that were first used in Disney Enchantment, premiered on April 3, 2023 replacing its successor. On January 29, 2026, it was announced that lasers will be removed from the show due to the Cinderella Castle's repainting.

== Technology ==
The show's technology has since been utilized into other shows at the Magic Kingdom, including Disney's Not-So-Spooky Spectacular, Minnie's Wonderful Christmastime Fireworks, and Disney Enchantment.

=== Lighting ===
The show uses 68 moving searchlights:

- 32 Elation Proteus Hybrid fixtures on the Fantasyland rooftops. There are 16 per side, each in two arrays of 8.
- 10 Proteus Brutus and Excalibur fixtures on the Fantasyland rooftops, with the Excaliburs placed right in front of the Brutus. There are 5 per side.
  - These used to be 10 AO Falcon fixtures, but they were disabled in August 2022. They were replaced by the Brutus and Excalibur fixtures in February 2024.
- 16 Elation Proteus Hybrid fixtures on the ground near the castle moat. There are 8 on per side. These fixtures are custom-painted green.

=== Lasers ===
The show also uses the following lasers:

- Two lasers around the clock area of the castle shoot beams above the audience toward Main Street. They were upgraded for Disney Enchantment in 2021, now additionally shooting down Main Street towards the train station, and utilized into Happily Ever After in the 2023 version.
- Two lasers installed on the Main Street rooftops outline various images on the castle, making them brighter.

== Show summary ==
=== Opening ===
"...And they all lived happily ever after.

Each of us has a dream, a heart's desire. It calls to us. And when we're brave enough to listen, and bold enough to pursue, that dream will lead us on a journey to discover who we're meant to be.

All we have to do is look inside our hearts and unlock the magic within..."

A keyhole appears on Cinderella Castle. Magical pixie dust flows through the keyhole and covers the castle and surrounding turrets in royal red and gold as the Happily Ever After theme song plays. Searchlights, lasers (from and towards the castle), and eventually fireworks come into play.

=== Dreams ===
Introduced by Tiana, various Disney characters are shown in which they express their deepest desires – Ariel from The Little Mermaid, Remy from Ratatouille, Rapunzel from Tangled and Quasimodo from The Hunchback of Notre Dame.

Songs featured: "Down in New Orleans (Prologue)", "When You Wish Upon a Star" (short instrumental interlude), "Part of Your World" (Instrumental) and "Out There".

=== Journey ===
Introduced by Merida, characters from Brave, A Bug's Life, Cars, Up, Finding Nemo, and Moana are shown embarking on their adventures.

Songs featured: "Touch the Sky" and "How Far I'll Go".

=== Friendship ===
Introduced by Aladdin, this segment highlights the friendships shared by Disney characters from Tarzan, The Lion King, Toy Story, The Jungle Book, Wreck-It Ralph, Big Hero 6, Zootopia, Inside Out, Monsters, Inc., and Aladdin. Blocks and toys are projected onto the castle and the clock tower of the castle seems to sing with projection mapping. The segment comes full circle with a showstopping performance by the Genie.

Songs featured: "Friend Like Me" (Instrumental), "Trashin' the Camp", "Hakuna Matata" (Instrumental), "You've Got a Friend in Me" (Instrumental), "The Bare Necessities" (Instrumental), "That's What Friends Are For (The Vulture Song)" and "Friend Like Me" (again but with vocals).

=== Love ===
Introduced by Olaf, a full moon rises across the castle that leads into romances and acts of love shared by characters from WALL-E, The Lion King, Tarzan, Inside Out, Finding Dory, Up, Dumbo, Zootopia and The Incredibles. The castle turns into a garden with waterfalls and then transitions to show silhouettes of Disney princes and princesses; floating lanterns from Tangled are seen covering the castle as Rapunzel and Flynn Rider duet and send their own lanterns to the top of the castle.

Songs featured are "Love is an Open Door", "Can You Feel the Love Tonight" (Instrumental), "You'll Be in My Heart" (Instrumental) and "I See the Light".

=== Adversity ===
Introduced by the Emperor of China from Mulan, the show becomes aggressive and loud, highlighting the climactic battles and challenges the characters face including epic scenes from The Incredibles, The Little Mermaid, The Lion King, Aladdin, Sleeping Beauty, and Pirates of the Caribbean. The castle and its surroundings are peppered with explosions as many more climactic scenes are shown. When it is over, the castle is left a flaming ruin with gaping holes in its sides.

Music featured (All music in this section are instrumental): "Honor to Us All" (Instrumental), "Wolves" from Frozen, "...To Die For" from The Lion King and "He's a Pirate".

=== Triumph ===
The visage constellation of Mufasa appears across a starry sky reminding us to “remember who we are”. As instrumental and choral versions of "Go the Distance" from Hercules plays, turret by turret, the castle gradually repairs itself while viewers see the featured characters in their triumphant moments. As the music swells, the structure turns gold with stained-glass portraits of the characters, all of them accomplishing their 'happily ever after'. (Note: As of March 14, 2023, additional characters were added in stained glass projected at Main Street U.S.A. The addition includes Miguel from Coco, Mirabel Madrigal and Bruno Madrigal from Encanto, Elena from Elena of Avalor, Meilin Lee from Turning Red, Raya from Raya and the Last Dragon, Luca from Luca, and others.)

=== Finale ===
"And so our journey comes to an end. But yours continues on. Grab ahold of your dreams, and make them come true. For you are the key to unlocking your own magic. Now go, let your dreams guide you. Reach out and find your Happily Ever After."

The show ends with the narrator challenging the audience to unlock their own magic and make their dreams come true, just as the characters did. The keyhole reappears and a pixie flies from it, leaving a trail of dust around the central plaza. As the castle restores itself to red and gold, the pixie flies up to the highest spire, where it's revealed to be Tinker Bell, making her flight over the park to the familiar refrain of "You Can Fly" from Peter Pan. The castle and illuminated central plaza change color as multi-color peony fireworks appear in the sky whilst a grand choral version of the theme song Happily Ever After is played. The keyhole then turns and opens, unleashing a colorful final set of fireworks. (Note: This section initially included lasers throughout the finale during 2017 testing, but it was cut only before the original premiere of the show. Laser effect throughout the finale was originally restored in 2023 version, although the effect was later removed again in June of that same year.)

== See also ==
- Together Forever – A Pixar Nighttime Spectacular
- Wondrous Journeys
