= Mickey's Pirate and Princess Party =

Defunct event at Walt Disney World

Mickey's Pirate and Princess Party was a hard-ticketed (separate admission) event held throughout the months of January through June at the Magic Kingdom theme park at the Walt Disney World Resort in Lake Buena Vista, Florida outside Orlando. A smaller version was also planned for Disneyland Paris Resort in 2011, but was cancelled. This event combined two of The Walt Disney Company's franchises, the Disney Princess line and the Pirates of the Caribbean franchise.

== Walt Disney World version ==
=== History ===
Started in January 2007 and ending in 2009 at Walt Disney World, the event was created after cast members at the park saw many children dressed either as pirates or princesses at Mickey's Not-So-Scary Halloween Party (another ticketed event held yearly in September and October). Because of that, Walt Disney World decided to create a new event, which took two years of planning as part of their "Year of a Million Dreams Celebration." As Disney show director Tara Anderson said, "This new party allows guests to live out the adventures of scurvy pirates and pretty princesses. We have created a new Magic Kingdom event that lets you step right into your favorite stories and fairytales." Similarly to Mickey's Not-So-Scary Halloween Party, children and guests of all ages were invited to live out their favorite pirate or princess dream at the Magic Kingdom Park and dress up as their favorite pirate and princess characters. The event was full of a variety of exclusive themed entertainment and activities for the whole family, including "Disney's Enchanted Adventures Parade," "Magic, Music and Mayhem" (a special fireworks show), rare character meet and greet opportunities, dance parties, and so much more.

=== Theme lands ===
Each of the lands within the Magic Kingdom was centered to a theme related to royalty and piracy.

Adventureland – New Tortuga and Jasmine's Court: New Tortuga included a number of pirate themed activities including Captain Jack's Pirate Tutorial where children learned just what it takes to be a pirate from none other than Captain Jack Sparrow himself. Other entertainment offerings included a live pirate band and a variety of character meet and greets from Goofy, Pluto, Captain Hook, and Mr. Smee. Over in Jasmine's court, young princes and princesses learned what it took to be a member of Princess Jasmine's Royal Guard and met characters such as Aladdin, Jasmine, Abu, and Genie from the 1992 Disney film Aladdin.
Liberty Square – Riverboat Riviera: Here guests heard stories of the legend of the Jolly Roger and met characters from the 1995 Disney film Pocahontas, including Pocahontas herself, Meeko, and John Smith.
Fantasyland – Ariel's Court: Here guests had the opportunity to participate in Sebastian's Under the Sea Dance party where they partied the night away with under sea friends from the 1989 Disney film The Little Mermaid and even had a meet and greet with Ariel herself.
Tomorrowland – Solaris' System: Throughout Tomorrowland there was a number of different atmospheric entertainment offerings including a collection of break dancing pirates. There was also another dance party, Eclipse's Mixes - DJ Dance Party, where guests had an out of this world time with their favorite Tomorrowland characters.
Mickey's Toontown Fair – The Princess Pavilion: Here there was an outdoor pirate playspot for children to participate in a number of pirate themed games and activities. You also met royalty such as Cinderella, Belle, and Aurora.

=== The Adventure Map ===
When entering the party all guests were given a small pirate bag (you were not limited to just one) and your very own Adventure Map which was a map of the Magic Kingdom with clues on it so guests found different marks on the map throughout the park where they answered clues and received their own pirate treasure and princess gems. The treats that guests received for solving the riddles included plastic pirate coins, beads, chocolate treasure, and gems.

=== Activities and Entertainment ===
- Disney's Enchanted Adventures Parade – A parade that featured all of the Princesses and Pirates (including Peter Pan and Wendy). This brand new parade exclusive to this event included a variety of characters and dancers from everyone's favorite pirate and princess movies. The parade included state of the art floats and even had a select number of characters and knights riding horseback throughout the park.
- Magic, Music and Mayhem – A special fireworks show was held at this event.
- Dream Along With Mickey – A night time version of this daily show was held.
- Dance Parties – "Sebastian's Under the Sea Dance party" hosted by none other than Sebastian the crab and Flounder, Ariel's best friend and sidekick from the 1989 Disney film The Little Mermaid at Ariel's Grotto in Fantasyland. Children of all ages hit the dance floor and partied the night away with characters such as Flounder, Sebastian, and other under sea friends. Over in Tomorrowland at Cosmic Ray's Starlight Cafe guests were able to dance the night away with their favorite tomorrowland characters such as Lilo and Stitch themselves from the 2002 Disney film Lilo & Stitch itself as well as other favorites such as Chip and Dale.

== Disneyland Paris version ==
A smaller version of this event was planned at Disneyland Paris for June 2011. The event was cancelled in April 2011 with no reason given, but assumption was that ticket sales were slow. However, the plan had been used in 2018, as part of its 25th anniversary celebration.
