= Celebrate the Magic =

Nighttime show at Magic Kingdom

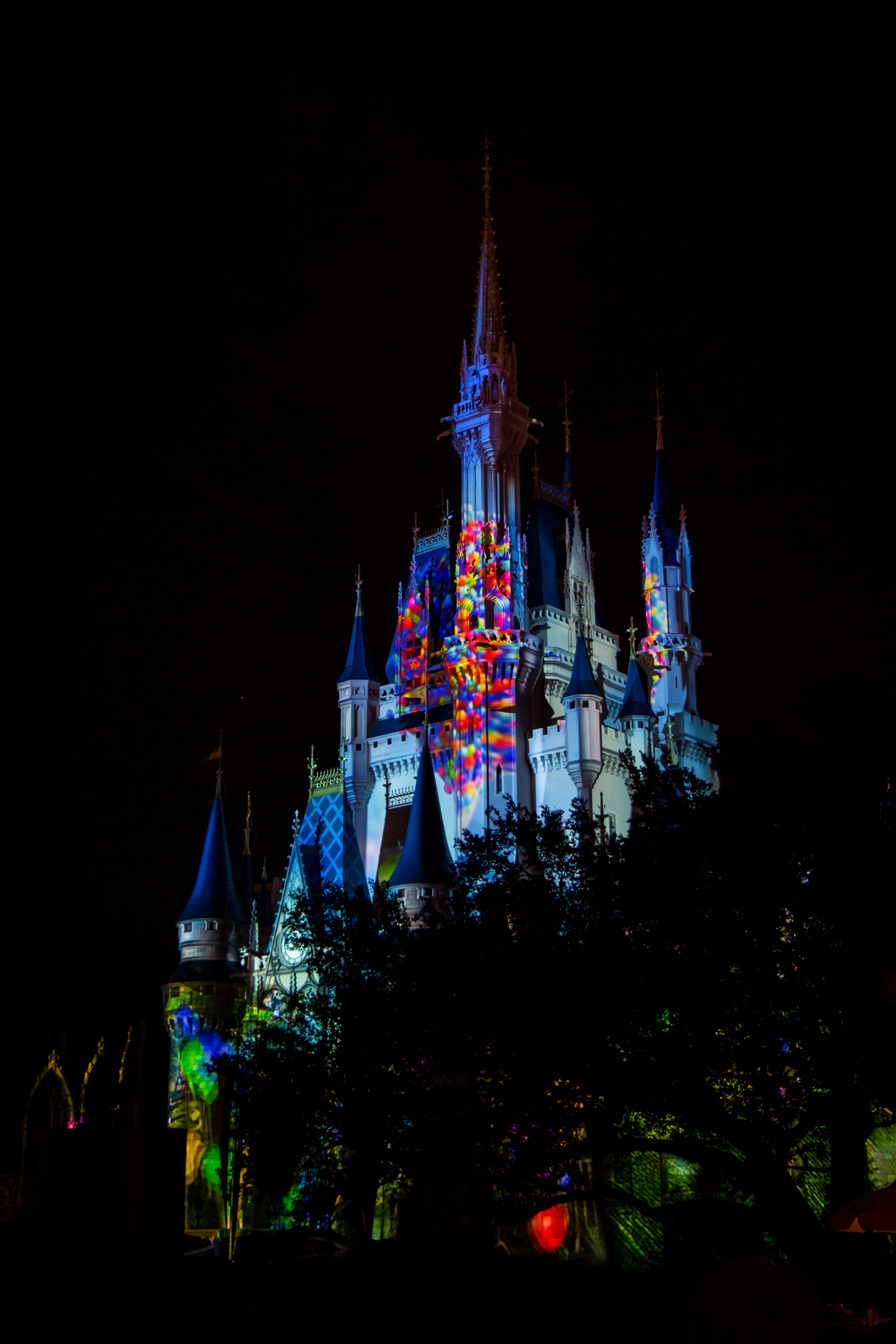

Magic Kingdom
- Area: Cinderella Castle
- Status: Removed
- Soft opening date: November 12, 2012
- Opening date: November 13, 2012
- Closing date: November 3, 2016
- Replaced: The Magic, the Memories and You
- Replaced by: Once Upon a Time

Ride statistics
- Attraction type: Multimedia and pyrotechnic show
- Designer: Walt Disney Creative Entertainment
- Theme: Iconic moments from Disney films
- Duration: 10 minutes
- Wheelchair accessible

Celebrate the Magic was a nighttime show at the Magic Kingdom park of Walt Disney World, that premiered on November 13, 2012. It replaced The Magic, the Memories and You display, a similar show that ran at the Magic Kingdom and Disneyland from January 2011 to September 4, 2012.

Celebrate the Magic takes place on Cinderella Castle and includes a contemporary musical score, projection mappings, pyrotechnics and lighting. A three-dimensional computer-generated rendering of Cinderella Castle was released by Disney in August 2012, revealing some of the various designs that will be displayed on the structure.

On October 26, 2016, it was announced that the show would be replaced by Once Upon a Time formerly from Tokyo Disneyland. The last Celebrate the Magic took place on November 3, 2016.

== Plot ==
Tinker Bell introduces the show as she appears flying over the castle's turrets. The castle is transformed into a paper canvas as Walt Disney appears sketching Mickey Mouse in his iconic Steamboat Willie appearance. Tinkerbell enchants a paintbrush, which then becomes the host of the show. A kaleidoscope featuring images of Mickey, Donald Duck and Goofy are projected followed soon after by short clips from Cinderella, Pinocchio and The Princess and the Frog. The show then progresses into longer, classic scenes from Disney films, including; Alice in Wonderland, Dumbo, Wreck-It Ralph, The Lion King, Tarzan, The Jungle Book, Lady and the Tramp, Tangled, Toy Story, Pirates of the Caribbean and Frozen. The show's climax features a fast-paced montage of characters and scenes from such other Disney films as Snow White and the Seven Dwarfs, Bambi, Sleeping Beauty, Pocahontas, Up, Peter Pan, The Little Mermaid, Finding Nemo, Beauty and the Beast, Aladdin, and Tangled. During the montage Walt Disney appears again, via archival footage, reciting one of his most famous quotes; "I only hope that we never lose sight of one thing – that it was all started by a mouse". The show then proceeds into a synchronized pyrotechnic finale.

== Seasonal outlook ==
Similar to its predecessor, Celebrate the Magic would showcase sequences from that will be appropriately themed to seasonal parts of the year. The show premiered with the original Christmas segment from The Magic, the Memories and You. The summer months showed films such as Phineas and Ferb, The Little Mermaid and Lilo & Stitch, in addition, segments featuring Disney Princesses and couples for Valentine's Day and Disney Villains for Halloween were shown, and in the winter, Frozen was showcased.

The summer edition debuted during the Monstrous Summer All-Nighter event on May 24, 2013, until August 31, 2013. The Halloween edition featuring the Disney villains debuted on September 1, 2013, until October 31, 2013. A new segment based on Frozen debuted on November 17, 2013, replacing a segment based on Brave.

== See also ==
- Disneyland Forever
- Together Forever: A Pixar Nighttime Spectacular
- Wondrous Journeys
