= Magic, Music and Mayhem =

Amusement ride

Magic Kingdom
- Status: Removed
- Soft opening date: 2005
- Opening date: 2008
- Closing date: 2010
- Replaced: Wishes: A Magical Gathering of Disney Dreams
- Replaced by: Wishes: A Magical Gathering of Disney Dreams

Ride statistics
- Attraction type: Fireworks spectacular
- Designer: Walt Disney Creative Entertainment
- Host: Fairy Godmother (Russi Taylor)
- Wheelchair accessible

Magic, Music and Mayhem was the name of a Disney fireworks display. It was held as part of Mickey's Pirate and Princess Party hard ticket event at the Walt Disney World Resort's Magic Kingdom near Orlando, Florida. This fireworks show was shown in place of the regular Wishes display during the event.

In June 2010, the show replaced Wishes during regular park hours as part of the Summer Nightastic! promotion, titled Summer Nightastic Firework Spectacular!

Hosted by the Fairy Godmother of Cinderella with the three good fairies Flora, Fauna and Merryweather from Sleeping Beauty, along with the traditional appearance of Peter Pan's resident pixie Tinker Bell, the show featured music from several Disney films including The Little Mermaid and Beauty and the Beast, but an invasion of pirates led by Peter Pan villain Captain Hook wreaks havoc with music from the Pirates of the Caribbean theme park attraction and feature films (including "The Black Pearl" and "He's A Pirate") until the fairies, with help from King Triton, Ariel's father and Sebastian stave off the rebellion by the buccaneers and peace is finally restore of it. The finale featured fireworks that changed from blue to pink at the request of the Fairy Godmother to settle the argument of Flora and Merrywether's continuing dispute since the finale of Sleeping Beauty. During the Summer Nightastic Promotion, King Triton and Sebastian were not featured. The Under the Sea portion of the show was introduced by the Fairy Godmother. Also during that time, the Fairy Godmother's opening spell and some of Captain Hook's dialogue were changed to reflect the promotion.

The soundtrack of this program, along with the "Disney Adventures Enchanted Parade" as well as those in Mickey's Not-So-Scary Halloween Party was available on an in-park CD entitled Magic Kingdom Event Party Music as of 2008.

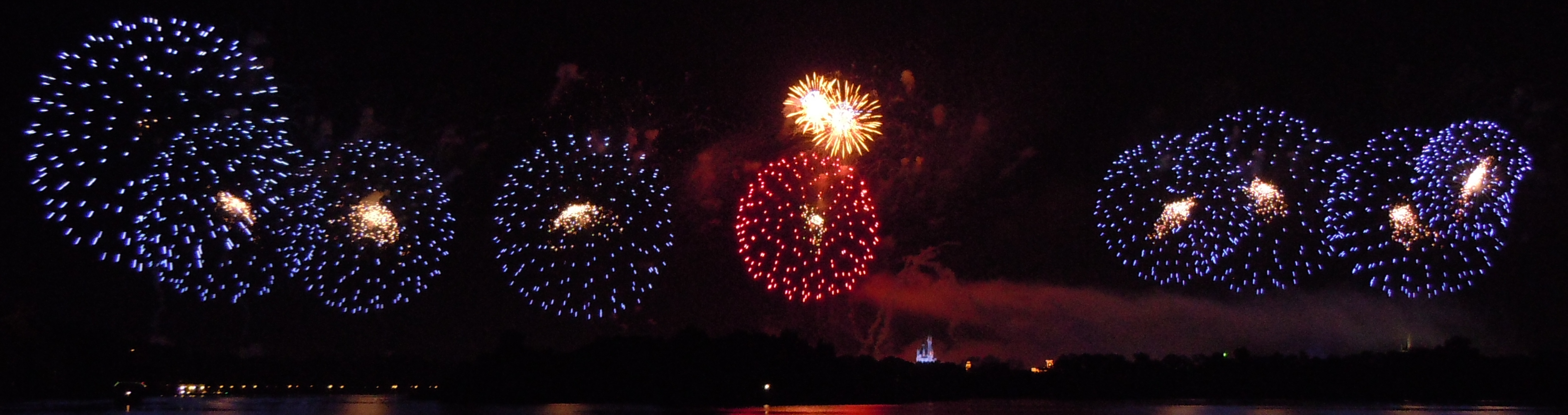
Summer Nightastic Firework Spectacular, June 2010

== Voices ==
- Fairy Godmother/Fauna – Russi Taylor
- Flora – Susan Blakeslee
- Merryweather – Tress MacNeille
- King Triton – Kenneth Mars
- Sebastian – Kevin Michael Richardson
- Captain Hook – Corey Burton

== Soundtrack ==
All songs are instrumentals except for the reprise of "A Dream Is a Wish Your Heart Makes". Music was arranged by Gordon Goodwin.

- Cinderella medley: "Bibbidi-Bobbidi-Boo", "A Dream Is a Wish Your Heart Makes" and 'So This Is Love" – from the 1950 film (Mack David, Al Hoffman and Jerry Livingston)
- "Beauty and The Beast" (from the 1991 movie of same title) (Alan Menken)
- "Once Upon A Dream" – Sleeping Beauty (Pyotr Ilyich Tchaikovsky from the ballet of the same name; adapted by George Bruns)
- "So This Is Love" (reprise)
- "King Triton's Fanfare/Part of Your World" (The Little Mermaid) (Menken)
- "The Black Pearl" (Pirates of the Caribbean: The Curse of the Black Pearl) (Klaus Badelt composer, Hans Zimmer arranger)
- "He's A Pirate" (Pirates of the Caribbean film series) (Klaus Badelt composer, Hans Zimmer arranger)
- "A Dream Is a Wish Your Heart Makes" (reprise with chorus singing)
