= Bob Gurr =

American amusement ride designer and imagineer (born 1931)

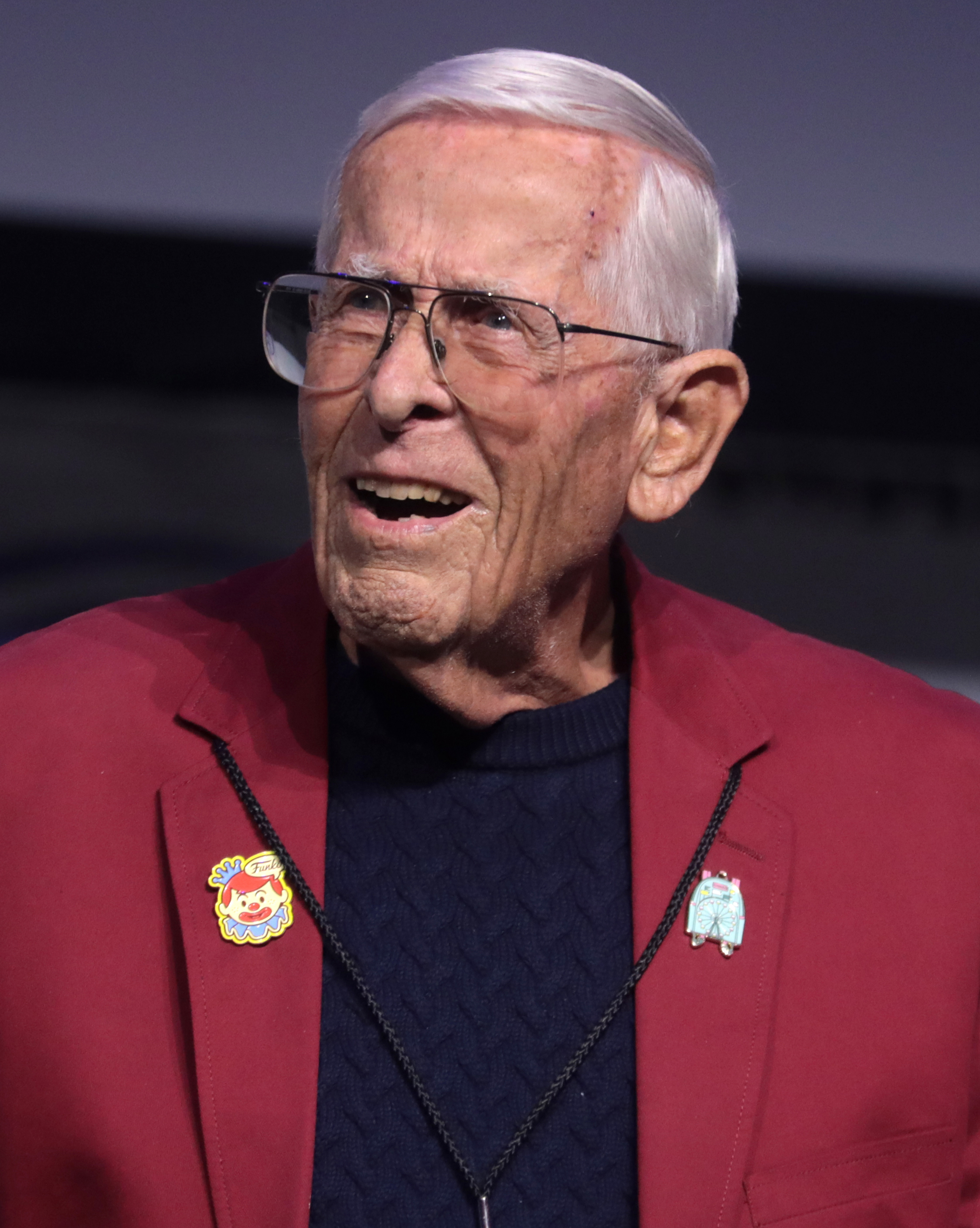
- Gurr at the 2023 WonderCon
- Born: Robert Henry Gurr; October 25, 1931 (age 95); Los Angeles, California, U.S.
- Notable work: Autopia; Main Street Vehicles; Disneyland Monorail; Matterhorn Bobsleds; Submarine Voyage; The Haunted Mansion; King Kong Encounter
- Title: Director of Special Vehicle Development, Imagineer, Themed Entertainment Designer
- Awards: THEA Award, Lifetime Achievement, 1999; Disney Legend, 2004

Robert Henry Gurr (born October 25, 1931) is an American amusement ride designer and Imagineer. His most famous work was for Walt Disney's Disneyland Park, and its subsequent sister parks. Gurr is said to have designed most, if not all, of the ride vehicles of Disneyland's oldest attractions, including Autopia, Main Street Vehicles, the Disneyland Monorail, Matterhorn Bobsleds, Submarine Voyage, and the Haunted Mansion. He was named a Disney Legend in 2004. He also worked on the King Kong Encounter animatronic for Universal Studios Hollywood.

== Early life ==
Gurr was born in Los Angeles in 1931 and raised in the community of Glendale, California. According to Gurr, he would skip school and sneak into the nearby Grand Central Airport to study and sketch the aircraft. Gurr studied industrial design at the Los Angeles ArtCenter School on a scholarship from the General Motors, graduating in 1952.

== Career ==
Gurr moved to Detroit, Michigan, to work in automotive design for the Ford Motor Company. After a brief unsatisfactory stint with Ford, he returned to Los Angeles and started his own company: R.H. Gurr Industrial Design. Gurr was friends with Disney animator Ub Iwerks, having attended school with Iwerks' son, and Iwerks asked Gurr to design the Autopia ride vehicles for the planned Disneyland amusement park. Gurr's work quickly impressed Walt Disney and Gurr became an essential designer for WED Enterprises (Walt Disney Imagineering), designing many of the rides at Disneyland. Gurr created the bobsled cars for the Matterhorn and was the first person to test-ride the roller coaster before it was finished. In 1959, Gurr designed and oversaw construction of the Disneyland Monorail based on his sketches of a Buck Rogers-style space craft.

Gurr helped create the Abraham Lincoln audio-animatronic for Disney's attraction at the 1964 World's Fair. Gurr designed two 1910 era vehicles of the Main Street Vehicles attraction for Disneyland's Main Street, U.S.A. The Carnation Wagon was designed for Carnation and was parked outside The Carnation Ice Cream Parlour, creating a photo opportunity for guests. It was built on a Model A chassis with Model T wheels. The body was designed by following guidance from his automobile book Antique American Cars by Floyd Clymer and old automobile magazines from the studio's library. Gurr also designed the 1910 style replica fire engine of the Main Street Vehicles attraction for the firehouse in the Town Square. He later gave himself the title of Director of Special Vehicle Development.

Gurr retired from Disney in 1981 after 27 years. In 1984, Gurr joined with other retired Disney Imagineers Dave Schweninger and Thomas Reidenbach to cofound Sequoia Creative. Their firm developed the 30-foot tall King Kong Encounter animatronic ape and the animatronic serpent in The Adventures of Conan: A Sword and Sorcery Spectacular for Universal Studios Hollywood. The same year, they created the animated light spiders and other effects for The Jacksons Victory Tour and the UFO spaceship that closed out the closing ceremony of the 1984 Summer Olympics. In 1986, Sequoia was contracted to design 42 rides for SamaWorld, a Disneyland-like resort and theme park to be built into the slope of a 5500-foot jungle mountain in Malaysia. Other projects designed or fabricated by Gurr and his Sequoia colleagues included Giant Whales exhibit for the Pacific Science Center in Seattle, the Kingdom of the Dinosaurs at Knotts Berry Farm, the Planet Septon laser arcade in Tokyo and the Fantasy Fountain for the Excalibur Hotel and Casino. In 1997, when casino magnate Steve Wynn wanted to sink a pirate ship several times nightly at his Treasure Island Hotel and Casino, he called upon Gurr, who figured out how to do it. Gurr also helped consult for the T-Rex animatronic in Jurassic Park (1993), and for the animatronic used in 1998's Godzilla.

== Personal life ==
Gurr is openly gay, coming out in the 2000s. He remained closeted during his early working years citing the fear of exposure created by the McCarthy Era and the Lavender Scare of the 1950s and 1960s. Gurr said, "It was assumed gay people were a diseased threat, and you had to design two lives for yourself.” Gurr was briefly married in 1956, divorcing in 1967. According to Gurr, although Walt Disney was conservative, Disney only cared whether his employees could get the job done, never about their personal lives.

== Books ==
In the 1950s Gurr was the author and illustrator of two books, both published by D. Post Publications, on the subject of auto design: How to Draw Cars of Tomorrow ASIN B0007G0Z5W in 1952, and Automobile Design: The Complete Styling Book ASIN B0007E4Y0G in 1955. In 2012, Gurr authored Design: Just For Fun his first hardbound book and self published book . Published by Ape Pen Publishing / Carlene Thie ISBN 978-0615553740 a 216-page hardcover book on his career in themed entertainment design at Disneyland and beyond. Limited to a 2000 run. With a foreword by Marty Sklar, the book is highly valued by collectors. Gurr's memoir BOB GURR: Legendary Imagineer: Life and Times – Disney and Beyond ISBN 978-1796313055 was published in 2019. Bob Gurr along with Ape Pen Publishing, self published a limited edition "Design Just For Fun' book.

== Honors ==
- In 1999, Gurr was awarded the Themed Entertainment Association's THEA award for lifetime achievement.
- In 2004, Gurr was inducted as a Disney Legend in a ceremony at the Disney Studios in Burbank, CA.
- Gurr's name appears on Main Street, U.S.A. windows at both Disneyland and the Magic Kingdom parks.
- In April 2025, the documentary about Gurr's life, Bob Gurr: Living By Design, premiered in Glendale.

== See also ==
- Rail transport in Walt Disney Parks and Resorts
