= The Dapper Dans =

Barbershop quartet

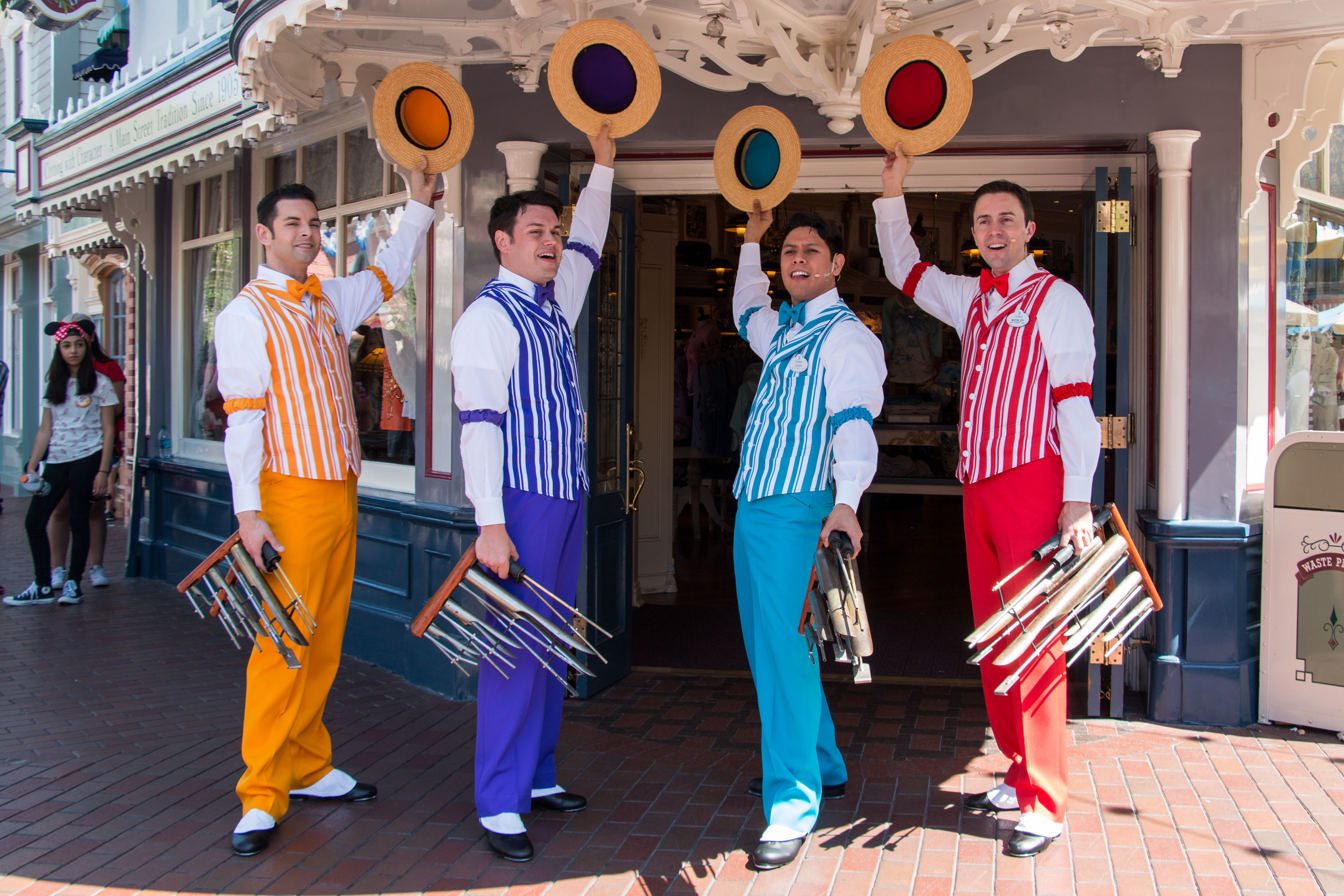
- The Dapper Dans performing in their regular outfits at Disneyland

Disneyland
- Area: Main Street, USA
- Status: Operating
- Opening date: 1959

Magic Kingdom
- Area: Main Street, USA
- Status: Operating
- Opening date: October 1, 1971

Disneyland Park (Paris)
- Name: The Main Street Quartet
- Area: Main Street, USA
- Status: Closed
- Opening date: April 12, 1992
- Closing date: 1995

Hong Kong Disneyland
- Area: Main Street, USA
- Status: Closed
- Opening date: 2005
- Closing date: 2008

Ride statistics
- Attraction type: Street performance
- Model: Barbershop quartet
- Music: Selections from Disney Pictures films

The Dapper Dans are an all-male barbershop quartet that has performed daily at Disneyland and Walt Disney World's Magic Kingdom since 1959 and 1971, respectively. They were formerly at Disneyland Paris from 1992 until 1995, and Hong Kong Disneyland from 2005 to 2008. Their act is a street performance out on Main Street, USA, performing a cappella renditions of song selections from films released by Disney Pictures, while during Christmastime, they sing classic holiday songs.

== The Main Street Quartet ==
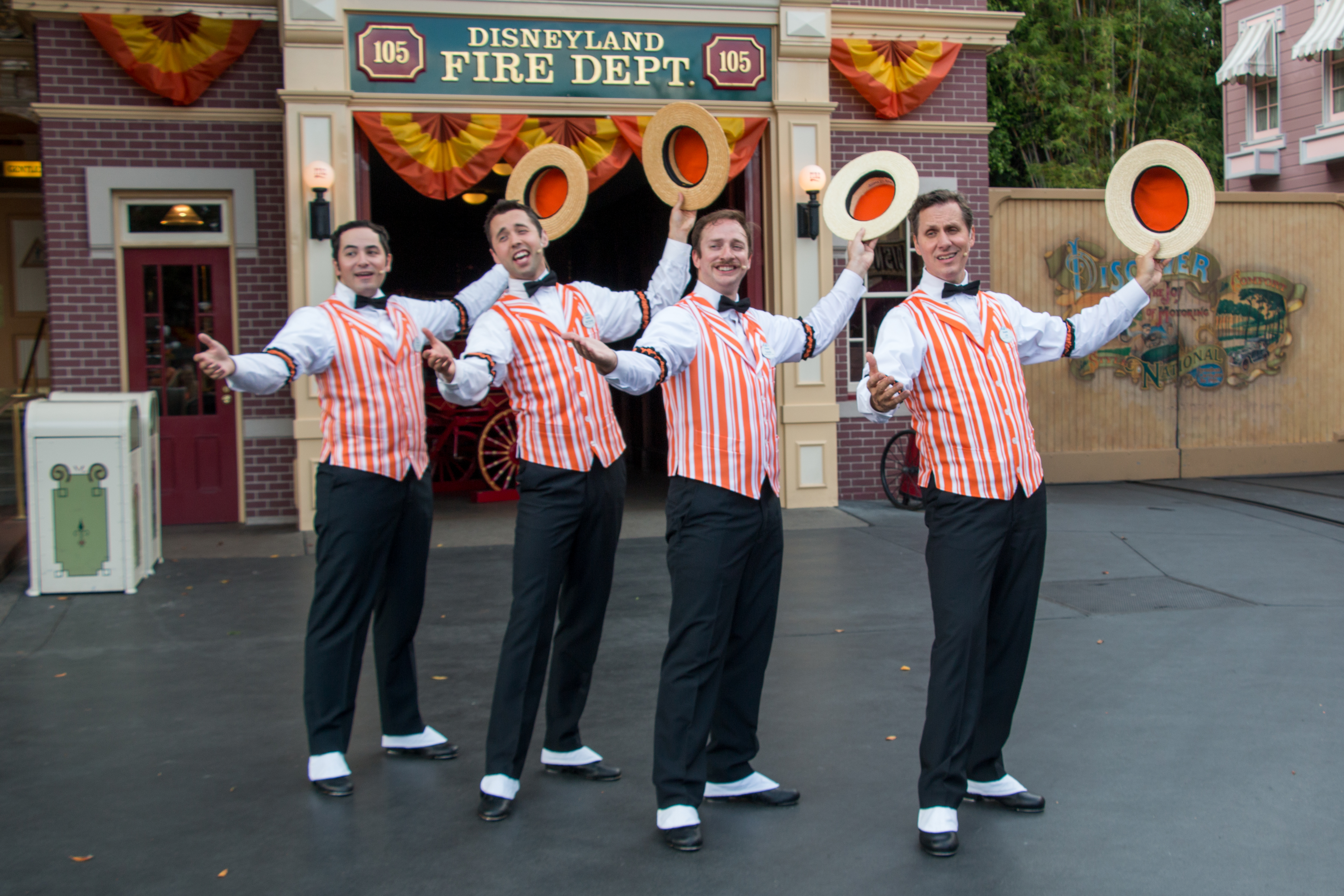
The Dapper Dans in their Halloween outfits at Disneyland.

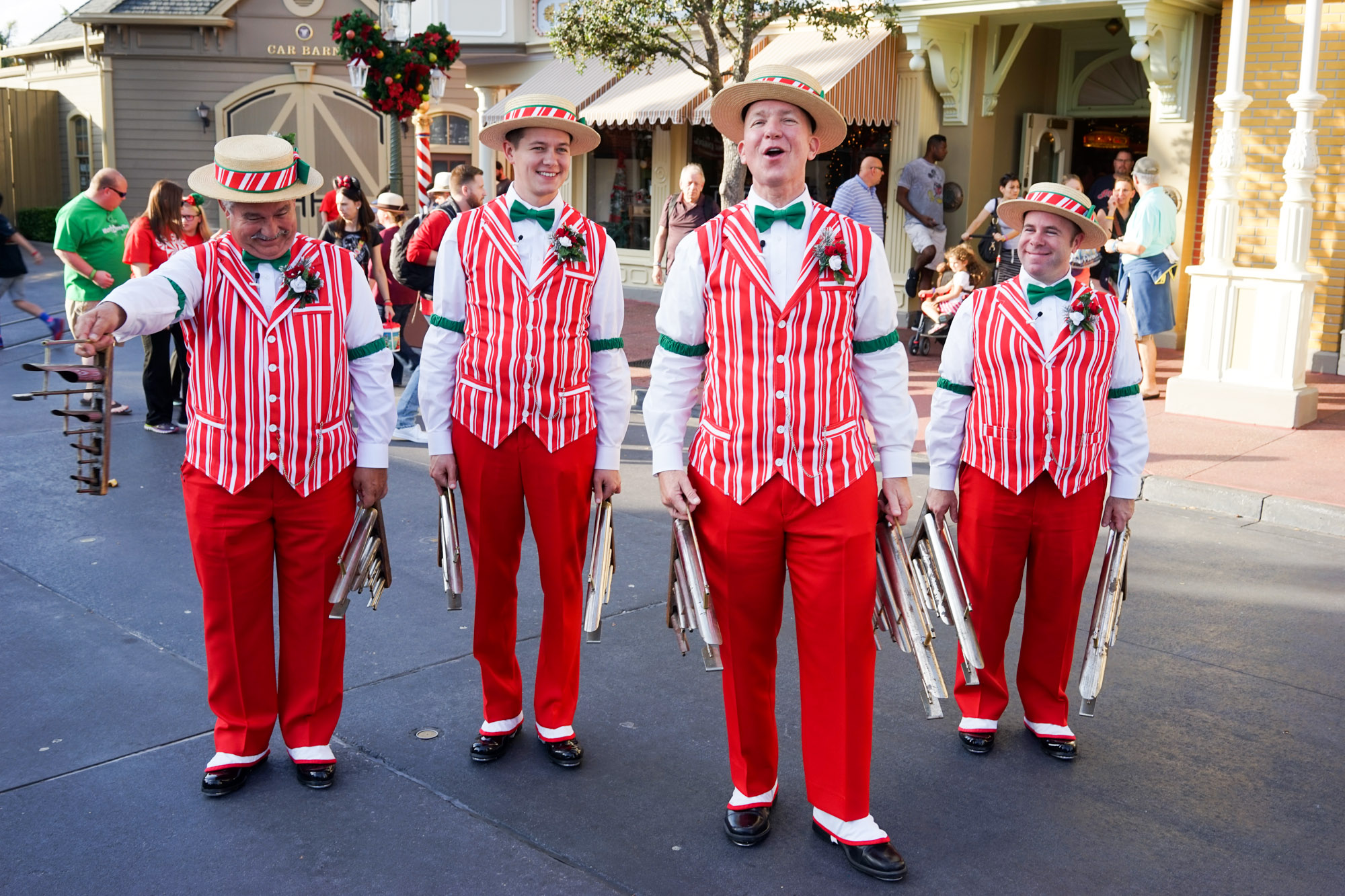
The Dapper Dans in their Christmastime outfits at Magic Kingdom.

At Disneyland Paris, the Dapper Dans performed as The Main Street Quartet, an English quartet from the United Kingdom who were part of the park's grand opening. Prior to joining Disneyland Paris, the quartet was known as Nickelodeon and was initially composed of Martin Baker, Mark Grindall, Steve Green and Jim Mullen and later, John Ward, Stuart Owen and Paul Garrett. The quartet continued together after leaving Disney, winning a bronze medal from the British Association of Barbershop Singers (BABS) and have performed at Disneyland Paris for the 25th and 30th anniversaries; they returned to Main Street, USA in costume for a VIP special event in 2020. Collectively, members of The Main Street Quartet have gone on to win chorus and quartet gold medals in BABS contest. The Quartet continue to perform in the UK and Europe.

== Notable members ==
Members of the Dapper Dans have included the Barbershop Harmony Society international Gold medalists Kevin Miles, Roger Ross, Myron Whittlesey, Christian O'Neil Diaz, Mike McGee, Chris Keough, Drew Ochoa, and Tony DeRosa; international collegiate quartet gold medalists Aaron Stratton, Paul Hesson, Chad Bennett, and Eric Monson; film and TV actor-comedian Monty Jordan; prominent LA session singer Jim Campbell; and Grammy Award winning Audio Engineer Tom Knox.

== In popular culture ==
In the 1993 The Simpsons episode "Homer's Barbershop Quartet", The Be Sharps' singing voices were partly provided by the Dapper Dans. Before working on the episode, Jeff Martin had seen one of the quartet's performances and enjoyed it. When the episode's production began, he contacted the quartet, and they agreed to make a guest appearance in the episode. The Dapper Dans' singing was intermixed with the normal voice actors' voices, often with a regular voice actor singing the melody and The Dapper Dans providing backup.

The Dapper Dans provide their voices for the Singing Busts in the 2003 Disney film The Haunted Mansion, based on the Disney theme park attraction of the same name; the characters are depicted as a quartet rather than a quintet like in the source material. (Note: According to the end credits of the film, Shelby Grimm, Harry J. Campbell, William, T. Lewis, Tim Reeder, and Bob Hartley are credited as the voices of the singing busts.) In the 22nd episode of the third season of the American sitcom Modern Family, "Disneyland", the Dapper Dans make an appearance at Disneyland, where Dylan (played by Reid Ewing) is seen performing as a Dapper Dan with the rest of the barbershop quartet while riding a tandem bicycle down Main Street, USA. The Dapper Dans also make an appearance, as anthropomorphic dogs, in the Mickey Mouse attraction Mickey & Minnie's Runaway Railway at both Disney's Hollywood Studios and Disneyland.
