= Resilient asphalt =

Resilient asphalt is a type of asphalt concrete designed to reduce aching of feet and joints from walking. It has been used at the 1939 New York World's Fair and on Main Street, USA in Walt Disney World.
