= Mickey's Very Merry Christmas Party =

Annual event at the Magic Kingdom

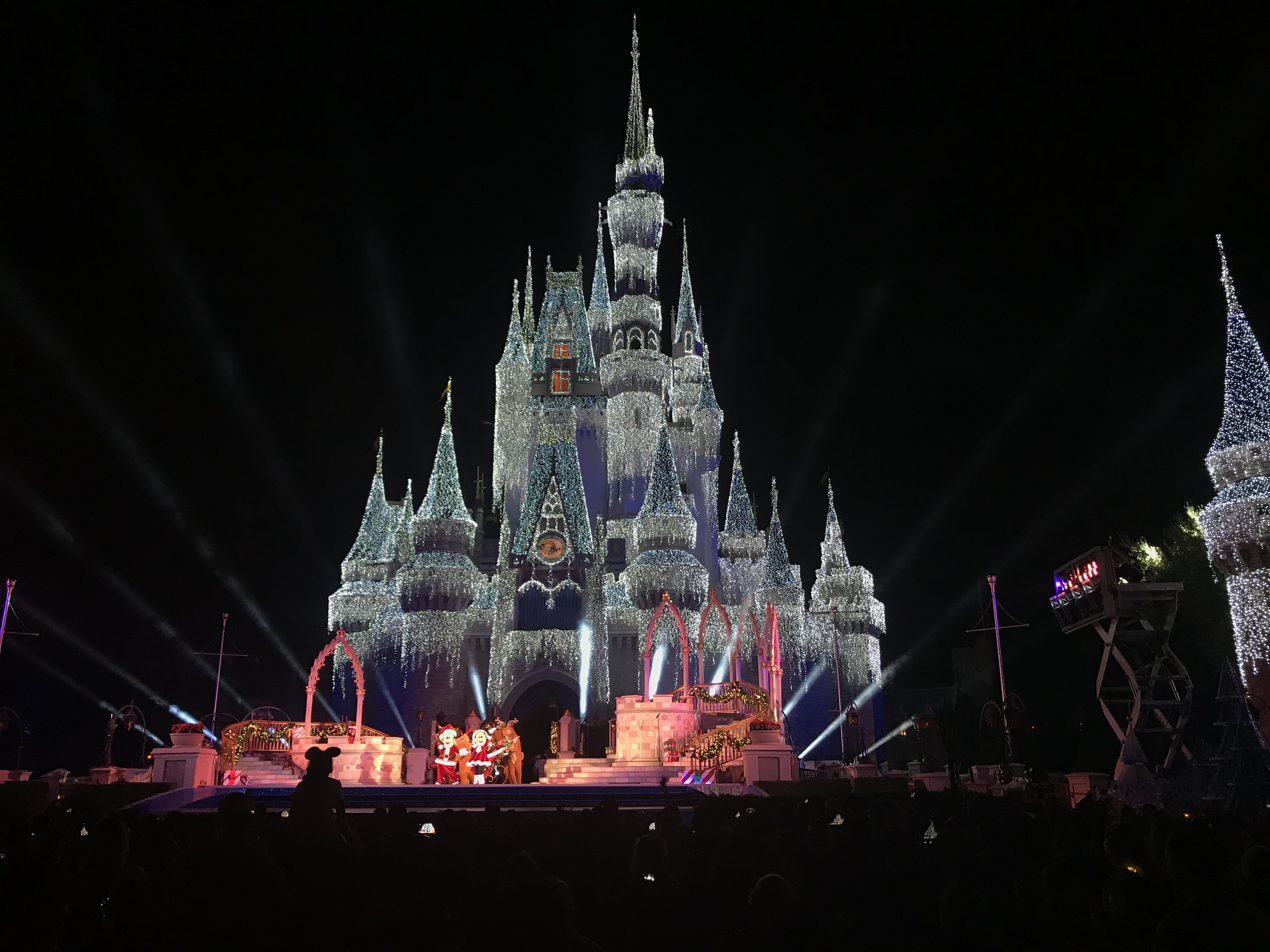
- Mickey's Most Merriest Celebration Stage Show

Magic Kingdom
- Opening date: December 16, 1983

Ride statistics
- Attraction type: Seasonal Event
- Theme: Christmas and holiday season
- Season: November–December
- Owner: Disney Parks
- Website: Official website

Mickey's Very Merry Christmas Party is a Walt Disney World event hosted at Magic Kingdom in Orlando, Florida on select evenings from 7:00 pm to midnight in November and December leading up to Christmas. It features several activities such as a parade, dance parties, character meet-and-greets, and complimentary treat stations.

== History ==
Mickey's Very Merry Christmas Party debuted in 1983.

In 2014, the show A Frozen Holiday Wish replaced an earlier show that featured Cinderella and her Fairy Godmother.

The show on the stage in front of Cinderella Castle was Celebrate the Season which ran from 2002 until 2015, when it was replaced by Mickey's Most Merriest Celebration Stage Show.

From 2003 until November 8, 2019, a holiday edition of the Wishes fireworks show, Holiday Wishes, occurred during the party. It included a medley of the original Wishes soundtrack with some Christmas season songs mixed in. The show started with Tinker Bell flying over the castle with narration by Jiminy Cricket. In addition, a lighting display was projected onto the castle, illuminating it in green so that it resembled a Christmas tree, and featuring Santa Claus.

Mickey's Very Merry Christmas Party did not take place in 2020 or 2021, because of the COVID-19 pandemic. In 2021, a Very Merry After Hours Event was held in its place. Mickey's Very Merry Christmas Party returned in 2022, as part of Walt Disney World's 50th Anniversary celebration, and held in 2023, as part of The Walt Disney Company's 100th Anniversary celebration.

== Events and shows ==
The event requires the purchasing of a separate ticket from the general admission ticket counter.

=== Events ===
==== Mickey's Once Upon a Christmastime Parade ====
The parade proceeds down Main Street, USA twice each night. It features Disney characters including Mickey and Minnie Mouse along with numerous others such as Anna, Elsa, Kristoff, and Olaf from Frozen, the Disney Princesses and their princes, Marching Toy Soldiers, Dancing Reindeer, Gingerbread Men, and Ole Saint Nick.

==== Minnie's Wonderful Christmastime Fireworks ====
Minnie Mouse hosts a firework display featuring Christmas carols such as "Deck the Halls" and "We Wish You a Merry Christmas".

==== Villains Pre-Parade ====
In November 2025, it was announced that a Villains Pre-Parade would take place during the daytime, before the holiday parade during Mickey's Very Merry Christmas Party at Magic Kingdom.

=== Shows ===
==== Mickey's Most Merriest Celebration Stage Show ====
Mickey's Most Merriest Celebration show appears four times a night on the stage in front of Cinderella Castle. It stars classic Disney and Pixar characters dressed up in their Christmas outfits. In addition, live performers sing and dance to vintage holiday carols.

==== A Frozen Holiday Wish ====
From 2007 through 2019, Cinderella Castle was covered in roughly 200,000 LED lights from November to the following January to look as if it was covered in ice and snow, an effect called Castle Dream Lights on Cinderella Castle. At dusk, a short show featuring the characters from Frozen took place in which Elsa used her ice powers to frost over the castle. Before 2014, the show was about Cinderella's wish of covering her castle with twinkling and shining lights coming true by her Fairy Godmother. It was hosted by Mickey, Minnie, Donald, and Goofy. The show was presented every night during the holiday season and was repeated during the limited-admission Mickey's Very Merry Christmas Party.

The Dream Lights effect and show did not return in 2022, and in June 2023, Disney announced a replacement for the show, with Frozen Holiday Surprise, which debuted on November 7, 2023, as part of The Walt Disney Company's 100th Anniversary celebration.

==== A Totally Tomorrowland Christmas Show ====
A Totally Tomorrowland Christmas Show is a 20-minute performance that debuted in 2009 and takes place several times a night on the Tomorrowland stage. It features Buzz Lightyear and Mike Wazowski teaching Stitch the meaning of Christmas before they've blasted Santa out of the sky.

== Rides and attractions ==
=== Attractions ===
Some popular attractions are open throughout the party. In the past, this has included It's a Small World. Unlike It's a Small World Holiday, Luigi's Joy to the Whirl and Mater's Jingle Jamboree at both Disneyland and Disney California Adventure, the classic opening day attractions do not have a holiday overlay.

=== Jingle Cruise ===
While not exclusive to the party, Jingle Cruise, which debuted in 2013, is limited to the Christmas season. The original Jungle Cruise ride is modified to include a Christmas theme throughout the queue, the boats' names are changed, and the skippers make holiday jokes.

=== Character meetups ===
Numerous characters appear throughout the Magic Kingdom to meet guests and pose for pictures. The characters are dressed in holiday themes exclusive to the Christmas season. Along with the regular characters who appear in the park, some rare characters, such as the seven dwarfs, make appearances for special events.

There are also generally two character dance parties each night, where guests have an opportunity to dance with Disney characters like Woody and Jessie. In the past, dance parties have been held in the Diamond Horseshoe and Cosmic Ray's Starlight Café.

== See also ==
- A Christmas Fantasy Parade
