= Main Street Cinema =

Movie theater at Disneyland

Coordinates: 33.8107°N 117.9188°W

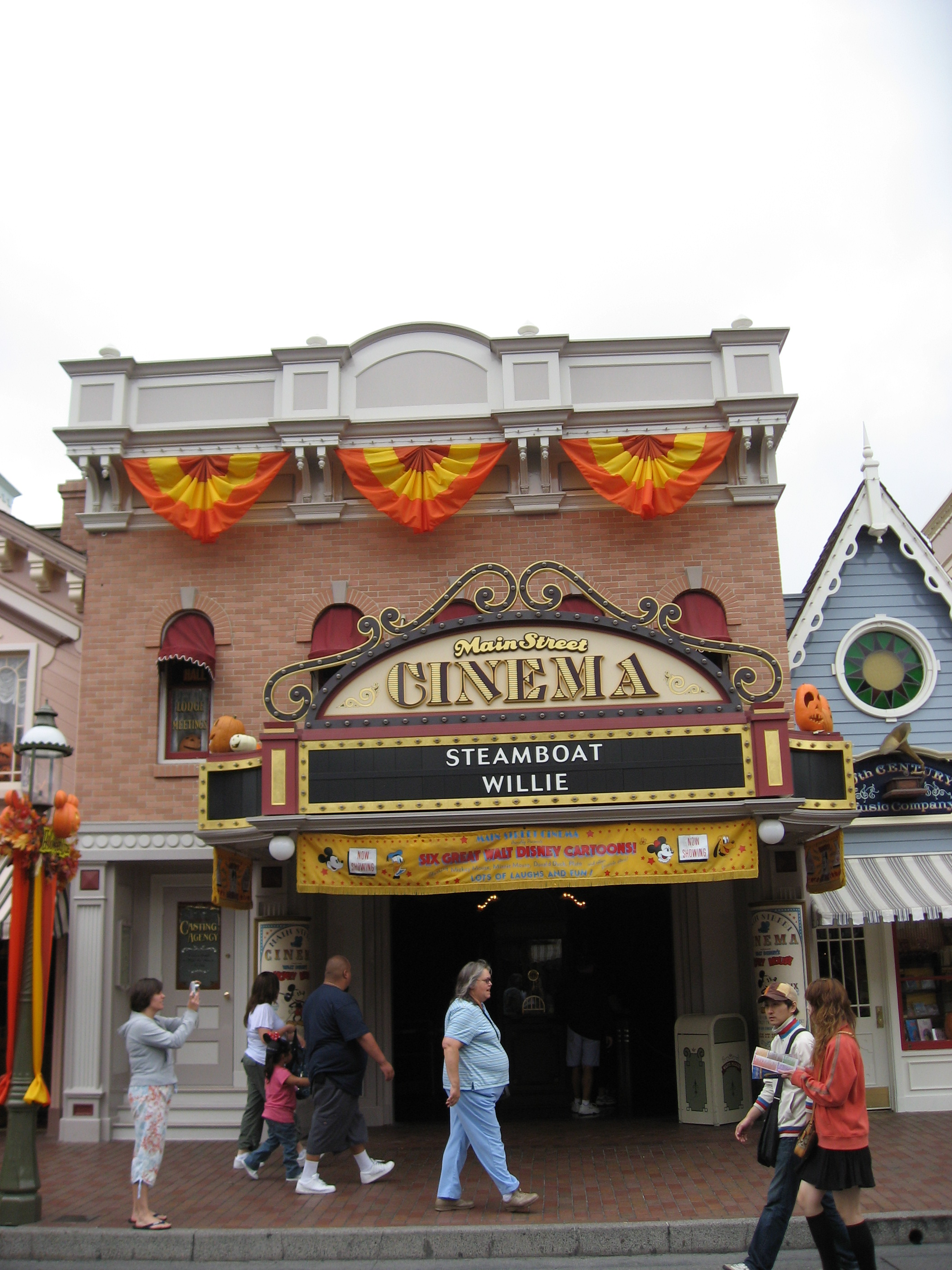
- Main Street Cinema with Halloween decor at Disneyland in September 2007

Disneyland
- Area: Main Street, U.S.A.
- Status: Operating
- Opening date: July 17, 1955

Magic Kingdom
- Area: Main Street, U.S.A.
- Status: Removed
- Opening date: October 1, 1971
- Closing date: June 1998
- Replaced by: Film Preview Center

Tokyo Disneyland
- Area: World Bazaar
- Status: Removed
- Opening date: April 15, 1983
- Closing date: October 20, 2002
- Replaced by: Grand Emporium

Ride statistics
- Attraction type: Movie theater
- Designer: WED Enterprises
- Theme: Turn of the century
- Wheelchair accessible

The Main Street Cinema is a small movie theater located on Main Street, U.S.A. at Disneyland and previously at Magic Kingdom and Tokyo Disneyland. Although the movie theater never existed at Hong Kong Disneyland, the park has a cinema facade for a Main Street building that houses a shop and a character meet and greet.

== Disneyland ==
When the theater opened on the park's opening day on July 17, 1955, the cinema showed many silent movies, including films starring Charlie Chaplin and Douglas Fairbanks. In the 1970s, these were replaced with several Disney Animation shorts on six different screens while a recorded musical accompaniment played. Five of the six shorts were played without sound and were changed from time to time. The sixth short was always Mickey Mouse's 1928 short Steamboat Willie, which was played with its original sound, albeit in an edited version; it included an introduction prepared for a 1950s reissue reminding the viewer when the short was created, and that it is still screening today worldwide.

In 2010, for the 55th anniversary of the park, footage of Disneyland's opening day was shown.

In June 2019, displays selling Disney resort-brand merchandise were added inside the cinema as a test to drive traffic into it. This was later removed, and benches were added.

In July 2025, the cinema was updated with a new film about the Sherman Brothers called The Last Verse, as part of Disneyland's 70th anniversary celebration.

In August 2026, the cinema reopened after a refurbishment and now shows the modern Mickey Mouse shorts created by Paul Rudish.

Original films shown

- Fatima's Dance (1903)
- A Dash Through the Clouds (1912)
- Gertie the Dinosaur (1914)
- The Noise of Bombs (1914)
- Dealing for Daisy (1915)
- Shifting Sands (1918)
- The Phantom of the Opera (1925)

Original Mickey Mouse shorts shown

- Steamboat Willie (1928)
- Plane Crazy (1929)
- Traffic Troubles (1931)
- The Moose Hunt (1931)
- The Dognapper (1934)
- Mickey's Polo Team (1936)

Current Mickey Mouse shorts showing

- No Service (2013)
- Yodelberg (2013)
- Croissant de Triomphe (2013)
- Tokyo Go (2013)
- Bad Ear Day (2013)
- Our Floating Dreams (2019)

== Magic Kingdom ==
The version at Magic Kingdom is also located on Main Street, U.S.A., and opened with the park on October 1, 1971. As with the Disneyland version, the cinema at Magic Kingdom originally showed silent films before switching exclusively to Disney Animation shorts (in 1988 in conjunction with Mickey Mouse's 60th Birthday). By 1994, the cinema showed the Mickey's Audition short that was previously shown at Disney-MGM Studios. Here, it aired under the title of Mickey's Big Break, alongside classic shorts Steamboat Willie, Plane Crazy, The Dognapper, Traffic Troubles, The Moose Hunt, and Mickey's Polo Team.

In early 1998, Main Street Cinema (the attraction) closed, the viewing platform and the original screens were all removed to maximize the square footage for the new retail format. Its original retail incarnation made some effort to connect to the cinema roots. Among other Disney shorts, such as Peculiar Penguins and Mickey's Garden, it showed some of Walt Disney's Kansas City films (including his very first), and the decor included film reels and filmstrip props scattered throughout. By 2005, it became a venue for guests to play the Virtual Magic Kingdom online game. VMK Central closed on September 30, 2007, and was replaced with a gift shop called The Art of Disney that November. It remained as such until 2021, when the store was closed and the artwork formerly housed there was relocated to a shop in Fantasyland.

In May 2021, the venue was used as a temporary location for the Sweets and Treats shop. For the 50th Anniversary Celebrations, the venue became home to continuous showings of The Magic of Walt Disney World, containing a shop known as the Walt Disney World Vault Collection Store. In 2023, the venue transitioned to a shop selling Mickey Mouse merchandise, and by February 2024 the marquee sign was changed to read "Mickey Mouseterpieces".

== Tokyo Disneyland ==
The Cinema at Tokyo Disneyland was housed in the World Bazaar, and operated from the park's opening day on April 15, 1983, until October 20, 2002, when the cinema closed to make way for an extension to the Emporium shop next-door, with the combined lot being renamed to the Grand Emporium in December 2002. The Main Street Cinema signage was removed in the process.

== See also ==
- List of Disneyland attractions
