= Main Street Vehicles =

Transport attraction at Disney theme parks

- Main Street Transportation Company logo

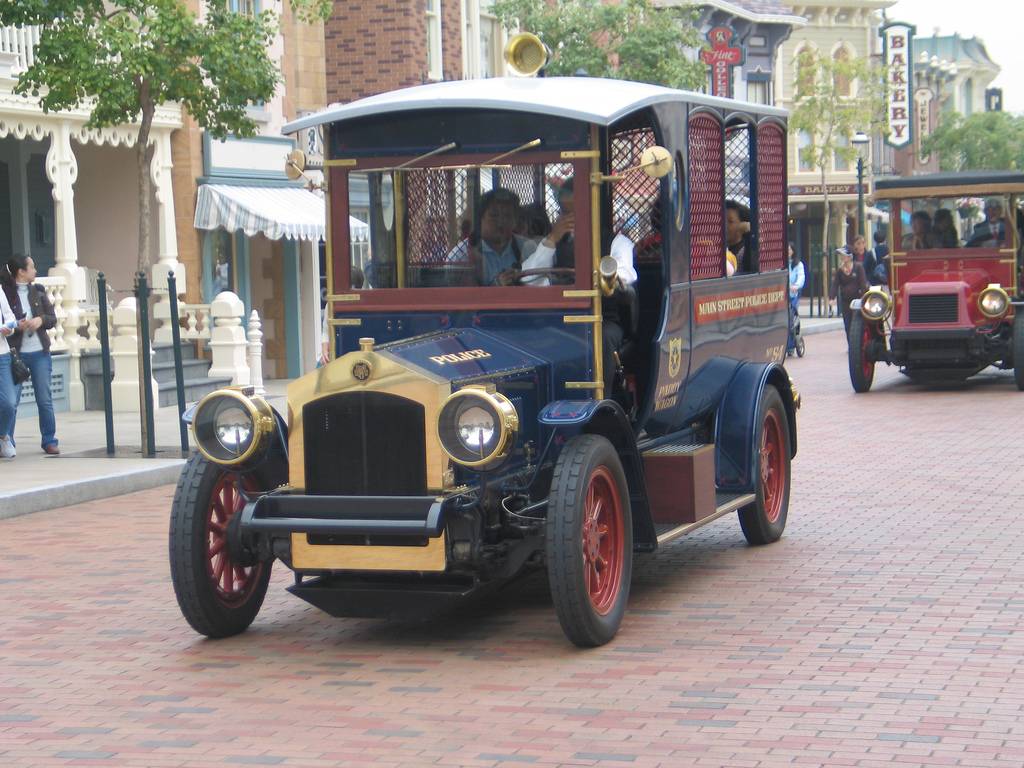
- Main Street Vehicles in Hong Kong Disneyland

Disneyland
- Name: Main Street Vehicles
- Area: Main Street, U.S.A.
- Coordinates: 33.8102°N 117.9190°W
- Status: Operating
- Opening date: July 17, 1955

Magic Kingdom
- Name: Main Street Vehicles
- Area: Main Street, U.S.A.
- Coordinates: 28.4167°N 81.5812°W
- Status: Operating
- Opening date: October 1, 1971

Epcot
- Name: Omnibus
- Area: World Showcase
- Coordinates: 28.3679°N 81.5494°W
- Status: Removed
- Opening date: October 1, 1982
- Closing date: Early 2000s

Disneyland Park (Paris)
- Name: Horse-Drawn Streetcars/; Main Street Vehicles
- Area: Main Street, U.S.A.
- Coordinates: 48.8711°N 2.7788°E
- Status: Operating
- Opening date: April 12, 1992

Hong Kong Disneyland
- Name: Main Street Vehicles
- Area: Main Street, U.S.A.
- Coordinates: 22.3130°N 114.0438°E
- Status: Operating
- Opening date: September 12, 2005

Tokyo Disneyland
- Name: Omnibus
- Area: World Bazaar
- Coordinates: 35.6330°N 139.8798°E
- Status: Operating
- Opening date: April 15, 1983

Tokyo DisneySea
- Name: Big City Vehicles
- Area: American Waterfront
- Coordinates: 35.6244°N 139.8871°E
- Status: Operating
- Opening date: September 4, 2001

Ride statistics
- Attraction type: Transportation
- Designer: WED Enterprises
- Must transfer from wheelchair

Main Street Vehicles is a series of turn-of-the-20th-century-style vehicle attractions in Disney theme parks throughout the world, consisting of 3 ft (914 mm) narrow gauge tramways with horse-drawn streetcars and free-roaming motor vehicles. They usually operate in their respective Main Street, U.S.A. sections, transporting park guests on one-way trips between the Town Square at the park's entrance and the Central Plaza at the park's center.

The original Main Street Vehicles attraction is located in Disneyland in California and includes horse-drawn streetcars and motor vehicles. The Main Street Vehicles attraction in Magic Kingdom within Walt Disney World in Florida has nearly identical offerings as its Disneyland counterpart. At one time, an omnibus transport option was present in Epcot within Walt Disney World. In Disneyland Park (Paris), the horse-drawn streetcars are billed as a separate attraction from its Main Street Vehicles and are simply named Horse-Drawn Streetcars. Only motor vehicles are included in the Main Street Vehicles of Hong Kong Disneyland. Omnibus in Tokyo Disneyland's World Bazaar section and Big City Vehicles in Tokyo DisneySea's American Waterfront section are similar attractions to Main Street Vehicles.

== Attraction concept origins ==
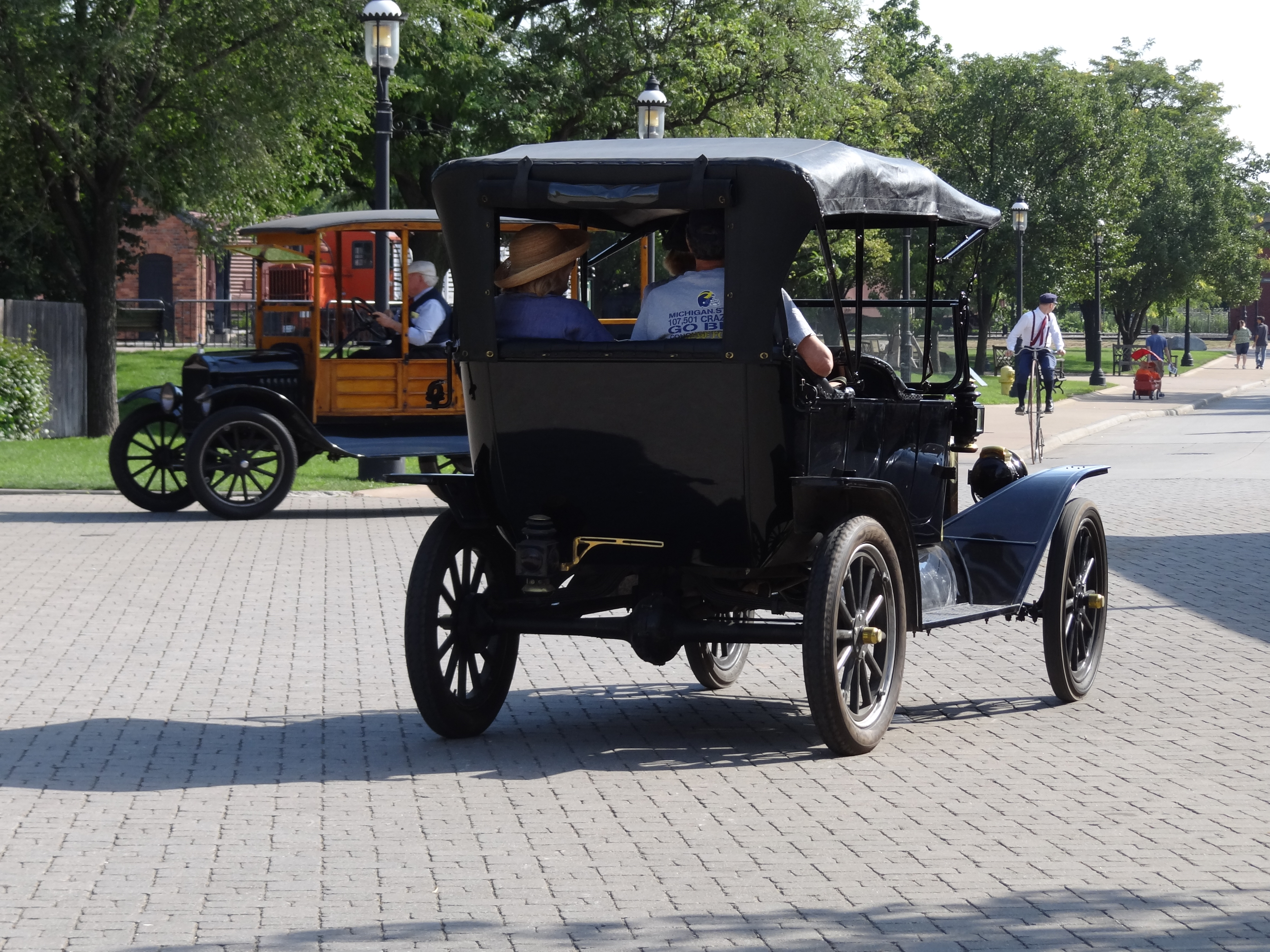
Greenfield Village (pictured) was one of the inspirations for including multiple transportation attractions in what would become Disneyland.

Walt Disney and Ward Kimball, a Disney animator and fellow rail enthusiast, travelled to the Chicago Railroad Fair in Chicago and Greenfield Village, an open-air museum in Dearborn, Michigan, in the summer of 1948. The historic vehicles that Disney saw at these locations led him to include several types of turn-of-the-20th-century-style vehicle attractions, including a horsecar, in a detailed description of a Mickey Mouse Park, which he first outlined in a formal Walt Disney Studios memo submitted on August 31, 1948. The concept of Mickey Mouse Park evolved into what would become Disneyland.

Bob Gurr of WED Enterprises (now Walt Disney Imagineering) developed all of the vehicles for the original Main Street Vehicles attraction. Each vehicle in the attraction was arranged to operate in Disneyland's Main Street, U.S.A. section, which is an idealized combination of Walt Disney's hometown of Marceline, Missouri, and Disney artist Harper Goff's hometown of Fort Collins, Colorado. The attraction contributes significantly to the Main Street, U.S.A. section's turn-of-the-20th-century theme, particularly the combination of sounds that its vehicles and horses make, which are meant to be in juxtaposition to the sounds that park guests would normally hear on a present-day street. Main Street Vehicles and similar attractions now operate in six Disney theme parks across the globe.

== Disneyland ==
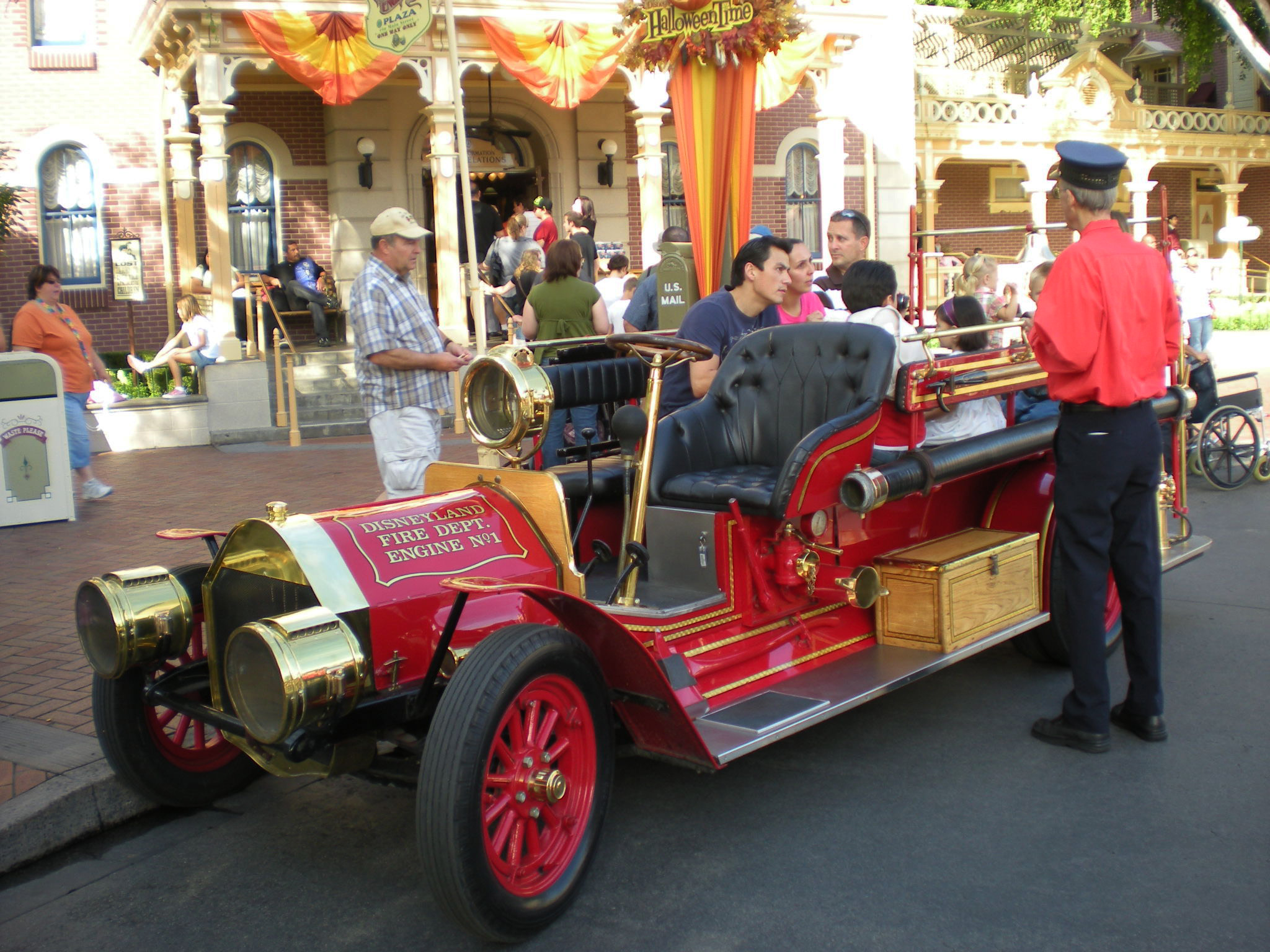
Fire engine in Disneyland

The Main Street Vehicles attraction in Disneyland in California opened with the park on July 17, 1955, and is located in the Main Street, U.S.A. section. Attraction vehicles present in that section on opening day included horse-drawn streetcars, horse-drawn surreys, and a horse-drawn fire wagon. In 1956, transport via horseless carriage (a.k.a: jitney) and omnibus were added. On August 16, 1958, fire engine rides were inaugurated. The fire wagon was retired in 1960 and put on display in Disneyland's Town Square fire station, and the surreys were discontinued in 1971. A one-way trip on each vehicle between the Town Square at the park's entrance and the Central Plaza at the park's center initially required an A ticket or a fee of 10 cents. Ride tickets and fees were replaced with a pay-one-price admission system in 1982.

Vehicle types in service as of 2024:

- Horse-drawn streetcar
- Fire engine
- Jitney
- Omnibus

=== Horse-drawn streetcar operations ===
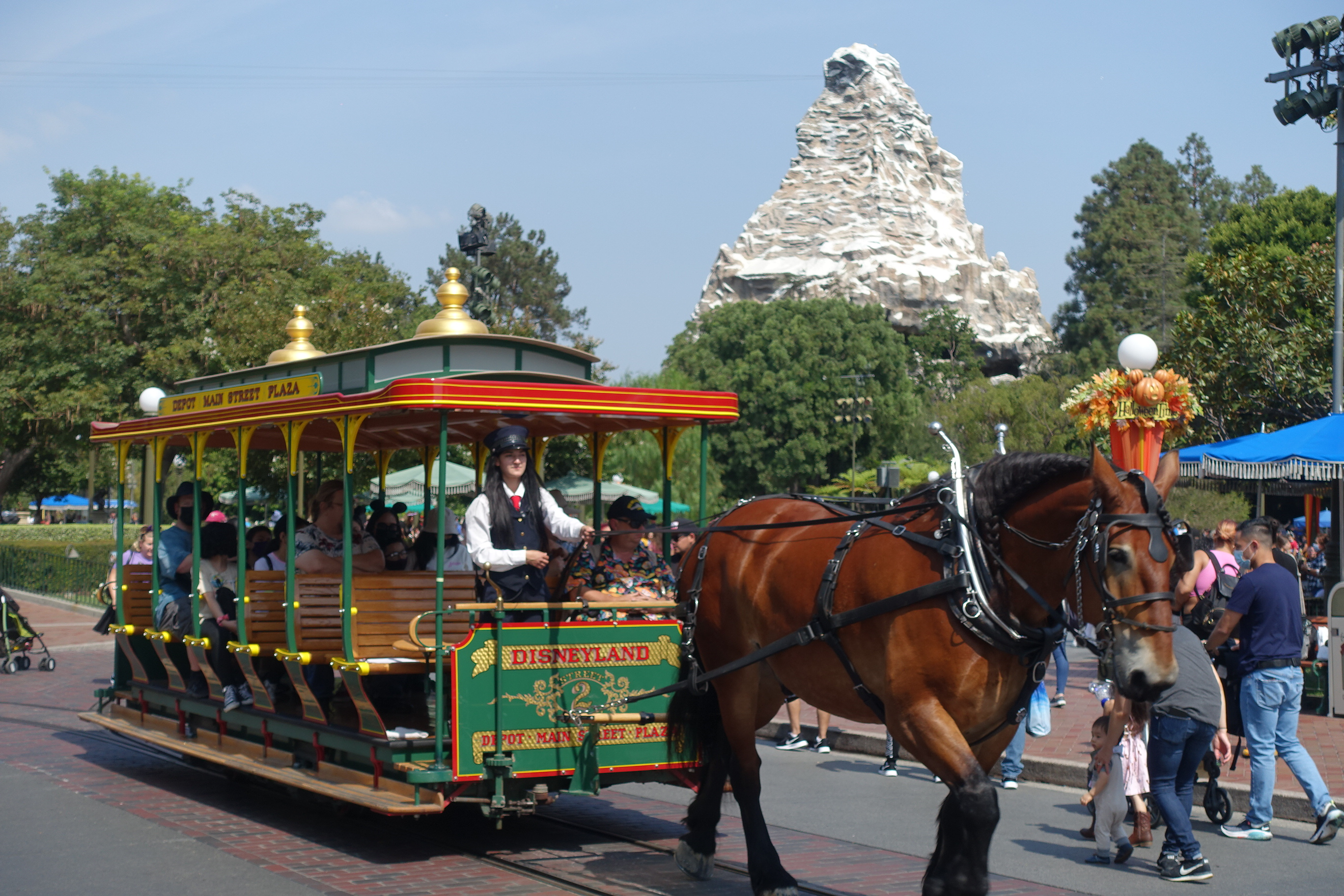
Horse-drawn streetcar in Disneyland

The draft horses used to pull the Main Street Vehicle's 3 ft (914 mm) narrow gauge horse-drawn streetcars consist of Belgians, Brabants, Clydesdales, Percherons, and Shires, and were originally housed on-site at the Circle D Ranch. To accommodate construction of Disneyland's Star Wars: Galaxy's Edge section in the late 2010s, the ranch was permanently moved 28 miles (45 km) away from the park to a facility in Norco, California, which had its grand opening on June 10, 2017. At the Circle D Ranch, new horses go through specialized training for six to twelve months to deal with their future work environment in Disneyland, including becoming acclimated to balloons, bands, bubbles, strollers, and umbrellas. Once training is completed, each horse employed with the Main Street Vehicles is transported to the park via horse trailer on its workdays, which consist of four-hour shifts three to four days a week.

Beginning at the Town Square loop adjacent to Disneyland's entrance, an individual horse controlled by an onboard conductor will pull one of the four Main Street Vehicle streetcars along the attraction's single-track tramway at up to 4 miles per hour (6.4 km/h), with all four streetcars capable of operating at once. Each open-air streetcar vehicle has forward-facing bench seating that can hold as many as 30 passengers. The horse-drawn streetcar goes around the Town Square loop in a counterclockwise direction, runs along the line's main stretch, heads through the right side of a midpoint passing siding, continues up the main stretch, enters the Central Plaza loop in a clockwise direction, and stops in front of Sleeping Beauty Castle. Once its journey resumes, the horse-drawn streetcar moves around the Central Plaza loop in a clockwise direction, arrives back at the line's main stretch, rolls through the right side of the passing siding, continues down the main stretch, reenters the Town Square loop in a counterclockwise direction, and stops where it started, completing the line's 1,830-foot (560 m) route.

== Magic Kingdom ==
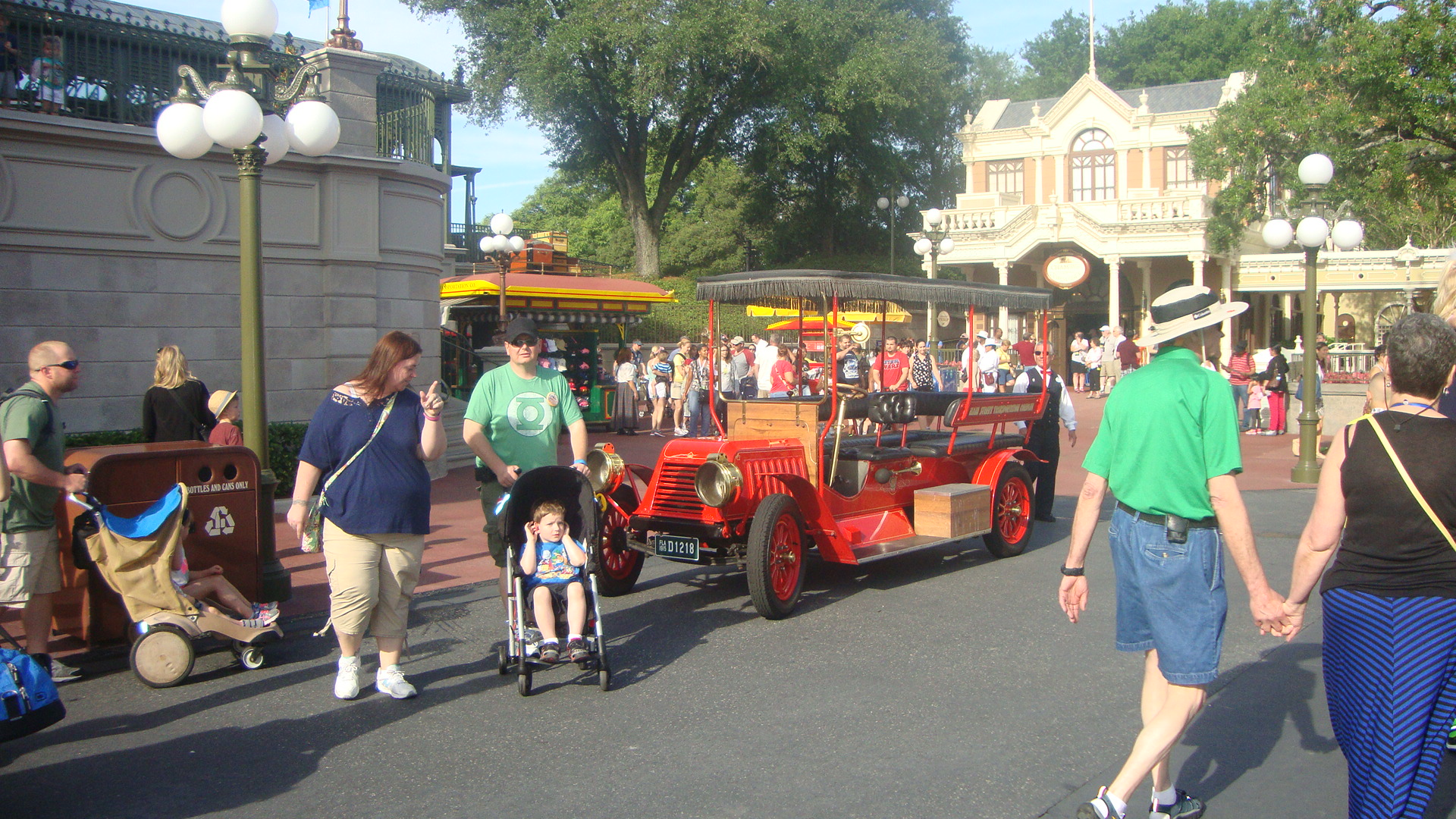
Jitney in Magic Kingdom

The Main Street Vehicles attraction in Magic Kingdom within Walt Disney World in Florida opened with the park on October 1, 1971, and is located in the Main Street, U.S.A. section. Each vehicle transports guests on one-way trips between the Town Square at the park's entrance and the Central Plaza at the park's center.

Vehicle types in service as of 2024:

- Horse-drawn streetcar
- Fire engine
- Jitney
- Omnibus

=== Horse-drawn streetcar operations ===
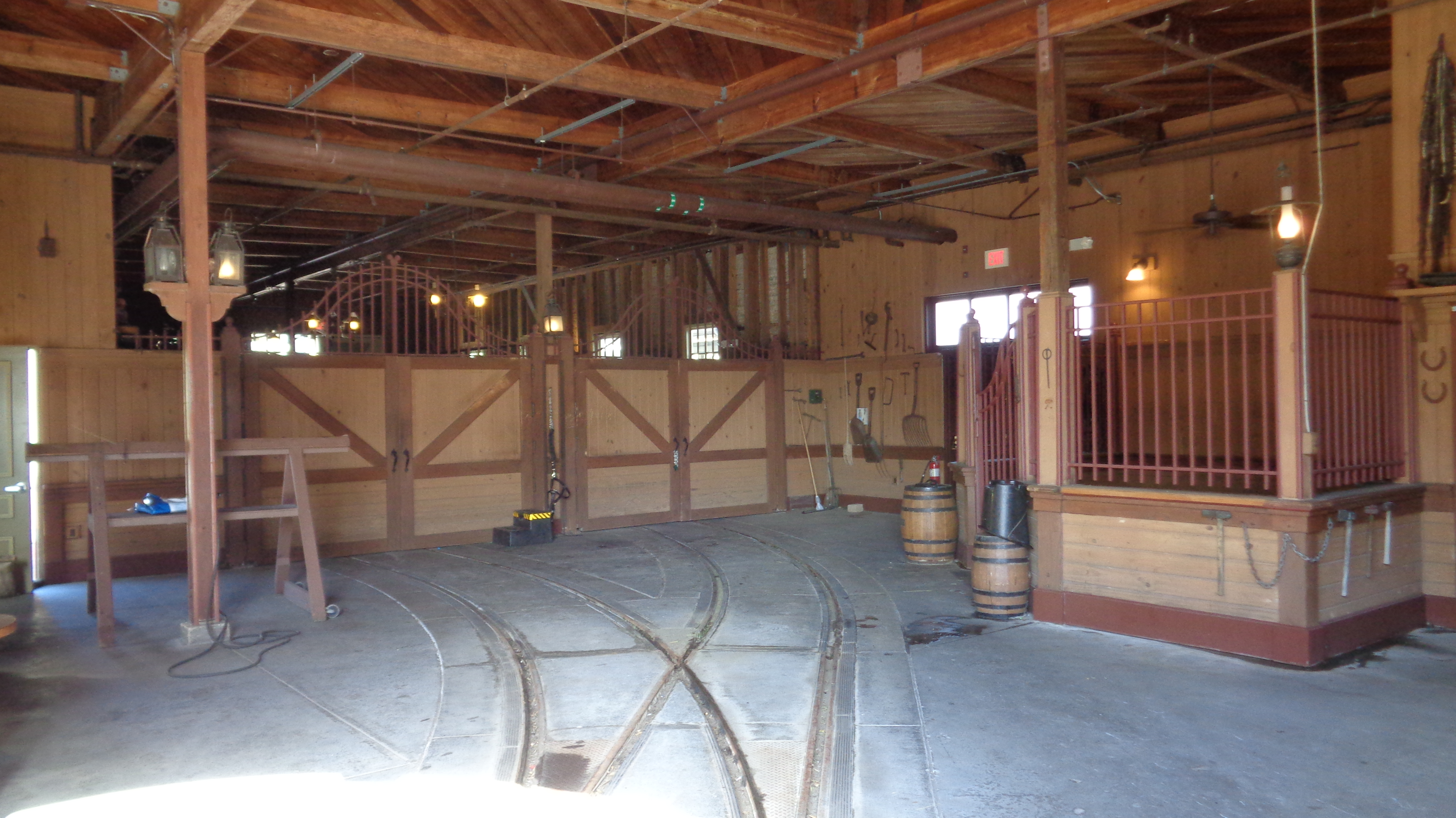
Car barn interior for the horse-drawn streetcars in Magic Kingdom

The draft horses used to pull the Main Street Vehicle's 3 ft (914 mm) narrow gauge horse-drawn streetcars consist of Belgians, Clydesdales, and Percherons, and are housed nearby at the Tri-Circle-D Ranch. The ranch is located in Disney's Fort Wilderness Resort & Campground within Walt Disney World.

The horse-drawn streetcars in the Magic Kingdom's Main Street Vehicles attraction are similar to their counterparts in Disneyland. Each streetcar vehicle has an empty weight of around 1,900 pounds (860 kg), and with a full load of 18 adults can weigh around 4,000 pounds (1,800 kg). Draft horses, which are larger than riding horses, usually weigh between 1,600 pounds (730 kg) and 2,000 pounds (910 kg), and can pull loads weighing 8 long tons (8,100 kg) on level rails. Unlike in Disneyland, the Magic Kingdom's streetcars go in counterclockwise directions around both the Town Square loop and Central Plaza loop. When the attraction's four (originally five) streetcar vehicles and horse tack are not in use, they are stored in a car barn at the end of a spur line connected to the Town Square loop. The attraction's track, including the car barn spur line, totals 1,600 feet (490 m).

== Epcot ==
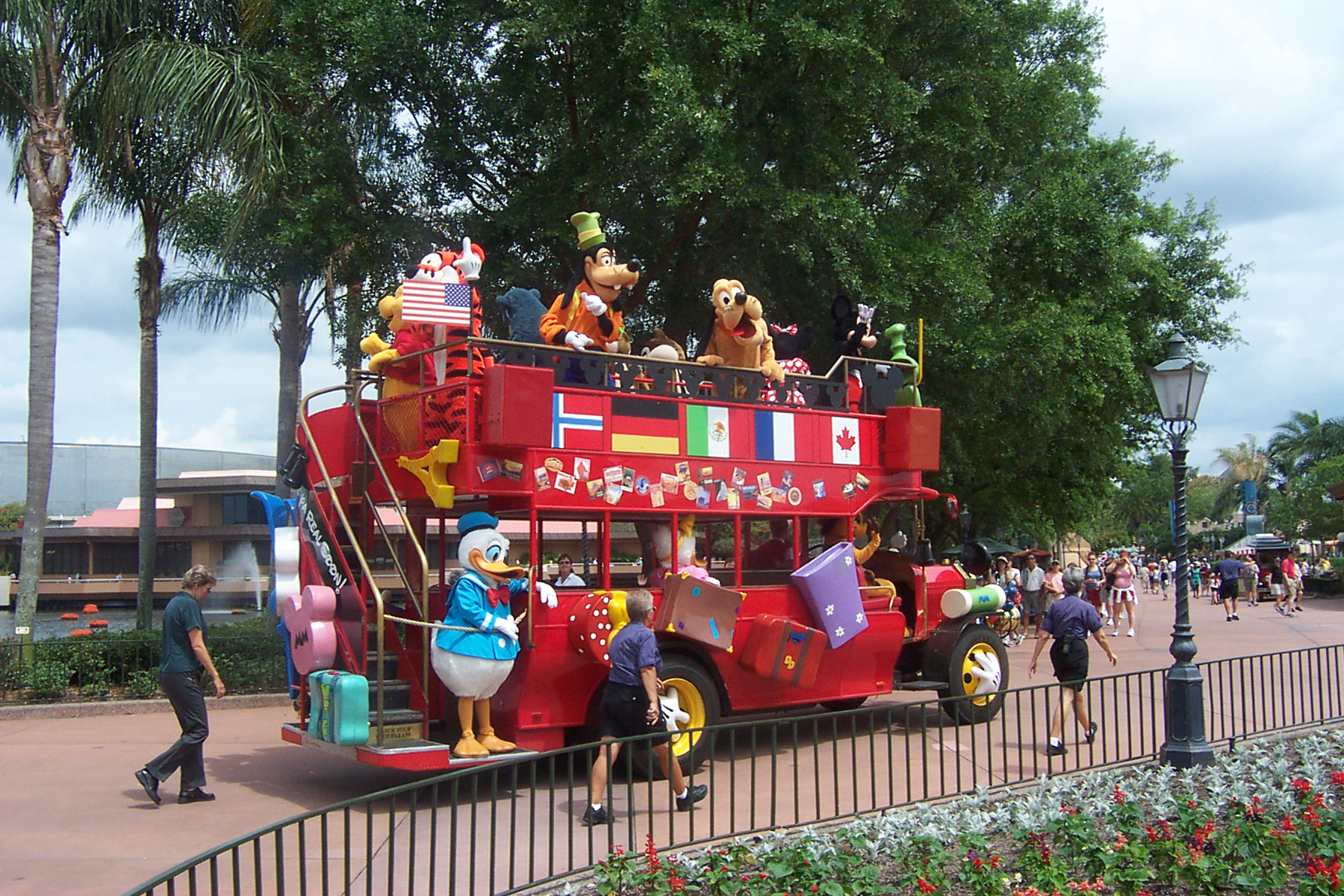
Parade omnibus in Epcot

Omnibuses started operating in Epcot within Walt Disney World when the park opened on October 1, 1982, and were located in the World Showcase section. They were eventually discontinued as transport options for park guests due to difficulties with navigating them through ever-increasing crowd sizes. At least one omnibus was used as a parade vehicle in the park until the early 2000s. An Epcot parade omnibus is now on display and occasionally runs at the Volo Auto Museum in Volo, Illinois.

== Disneyland Park (Paris) ==
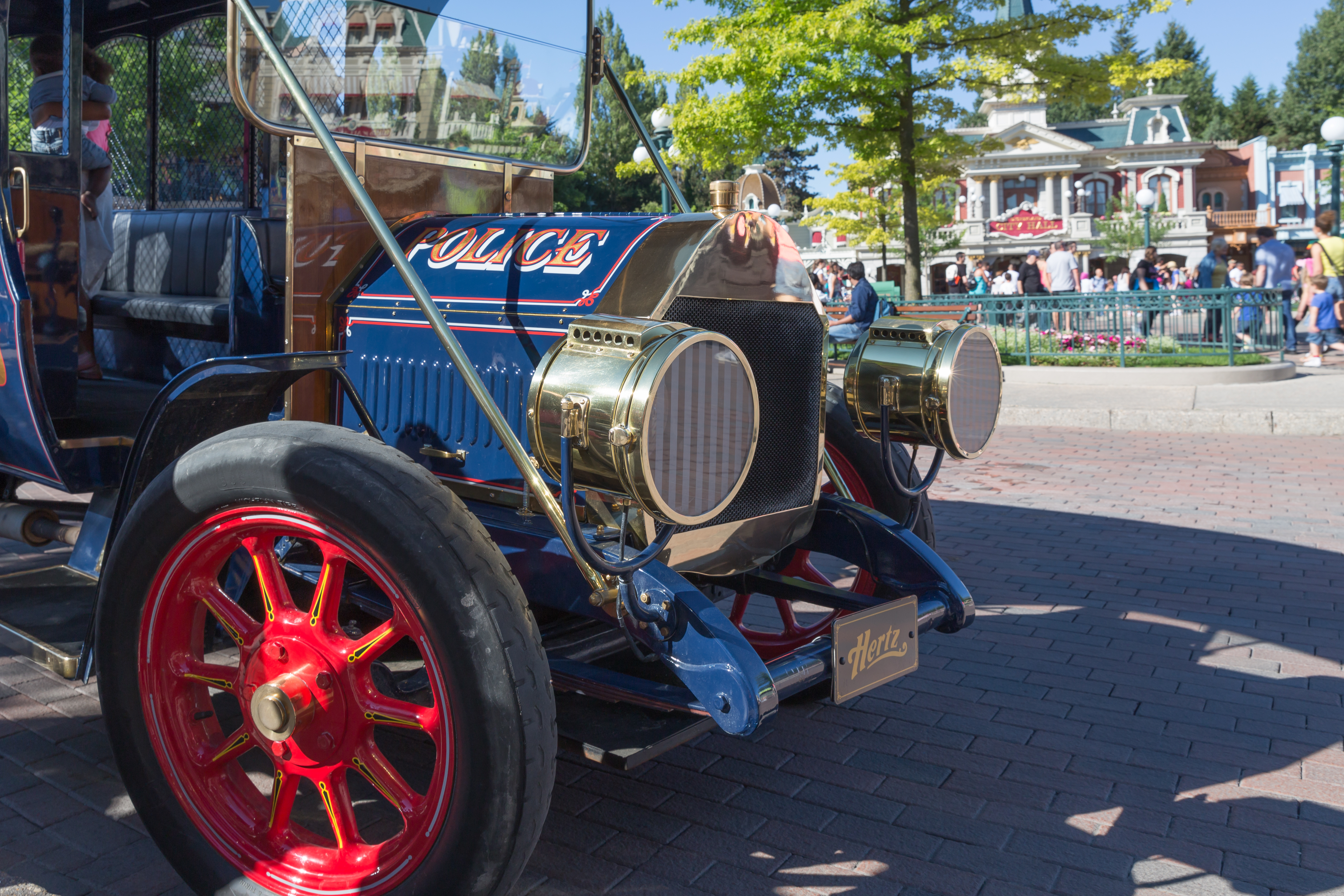
Paddy wagon in Disneyland Park (Paris)

The Horse-Drawn Streetcars and Main Street Vehicles attractions in Disneyland Park (Paris) opened with the park on April 12, 1992, and are located in the Main Street, U.S.A. section. Horse-Drawn Streetcars is a separately billed attraction from Main Street Vehicles. Each vehicle transports guests on one-way trips between the Town Square at the park's entrance and the Central Plaza at the park's center.

Vehicle types in service as of 2024:

- Horse-drawn streetcar
- Fire engine
- Limousine
- Mercer
- Omnibus
- Paddy wagon

=== Horse-drawn streetcar operations ===
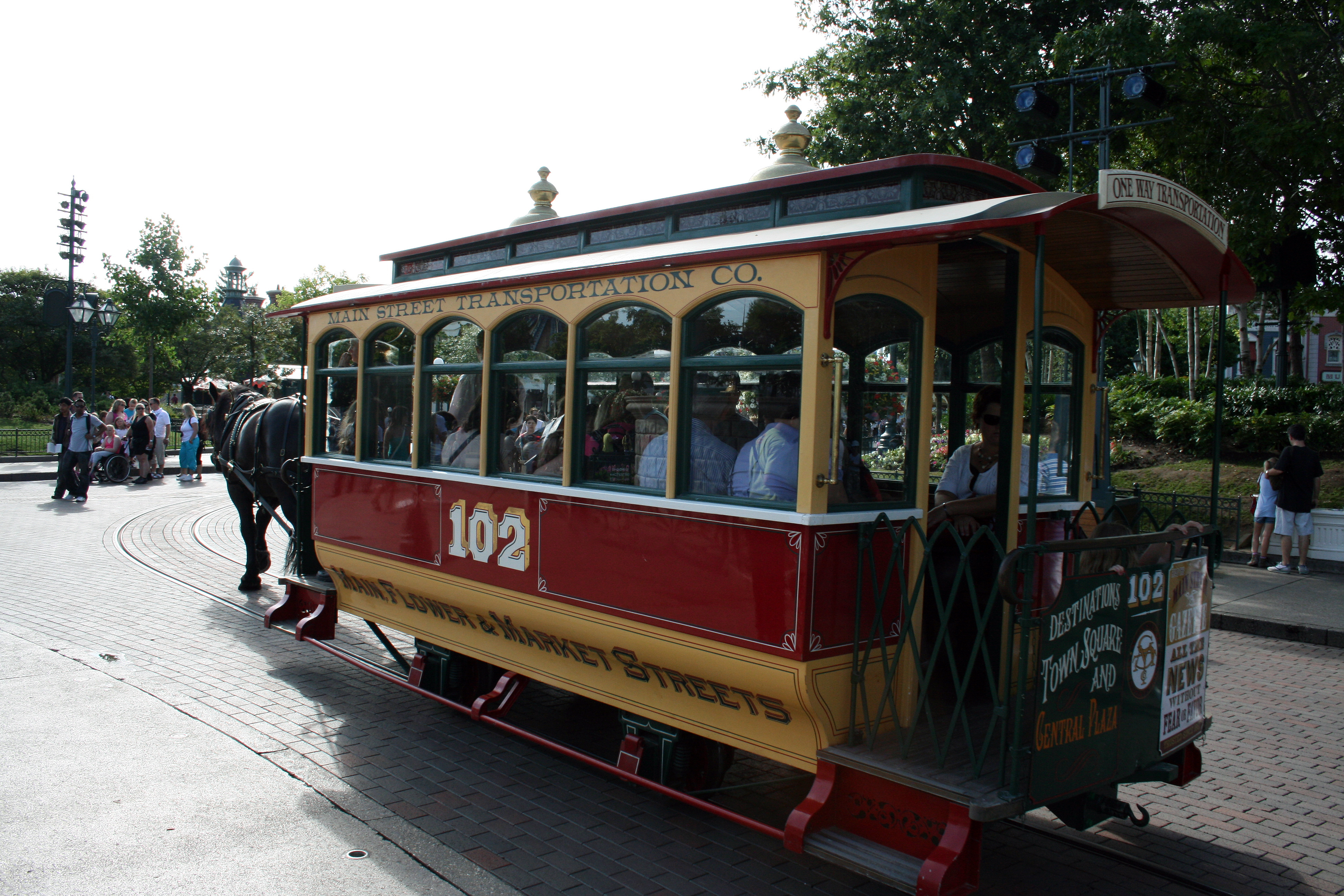
Horse-drawn streetcar in Disneyland Park (Paris)

The draft horses used in the 3 ft (914 mm) narrow gauge Horse-Drawn Streetcars attraction are Percherons, and are housed onsite at the simply named Pony Farm. When new horses are needed for the attraction, Percherons aged four or five years with good limbs and a quality aplomb are selected.

The three streetcars that the horses pull can be differentiated from their counterparts in the American Disney theme parks by their enclosed cabins with wood-panel interiors and inward-facing seating arrangements that can each accommodate 15 passengers. When the streetcar vehicles are not in use, they are stored in a car barn on Town Square.

== Hong Kong Disneyland ==
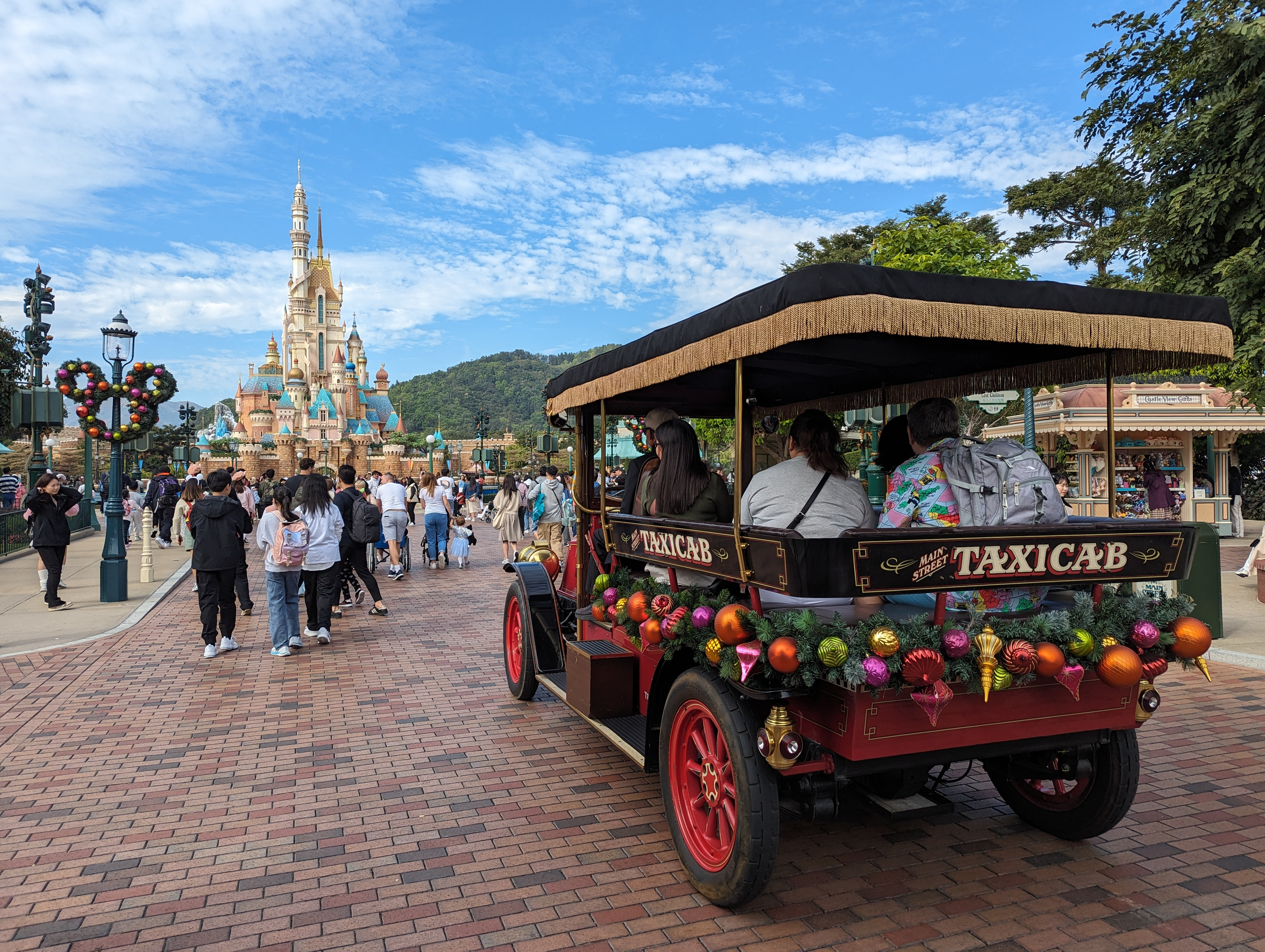
Taxi in Hong Kong Disneyland

The Main Street Vehicles attraction in Hong Kong Disneyland opened with the park on September 12, 2005, and is located in the Main Street, U.S.A. section. Unlike its counterparts in the US and France, Hong Kong Disneyland has never had horse-drawn streetcars. Each vehicle transports guests on one-way trips between both ends of the Main Street, U.S.A. section.

Vehicle types in service as of 2024:

- Omnibus
- Paddy wagon
- Taxi

== Tokyo Disneyland ==
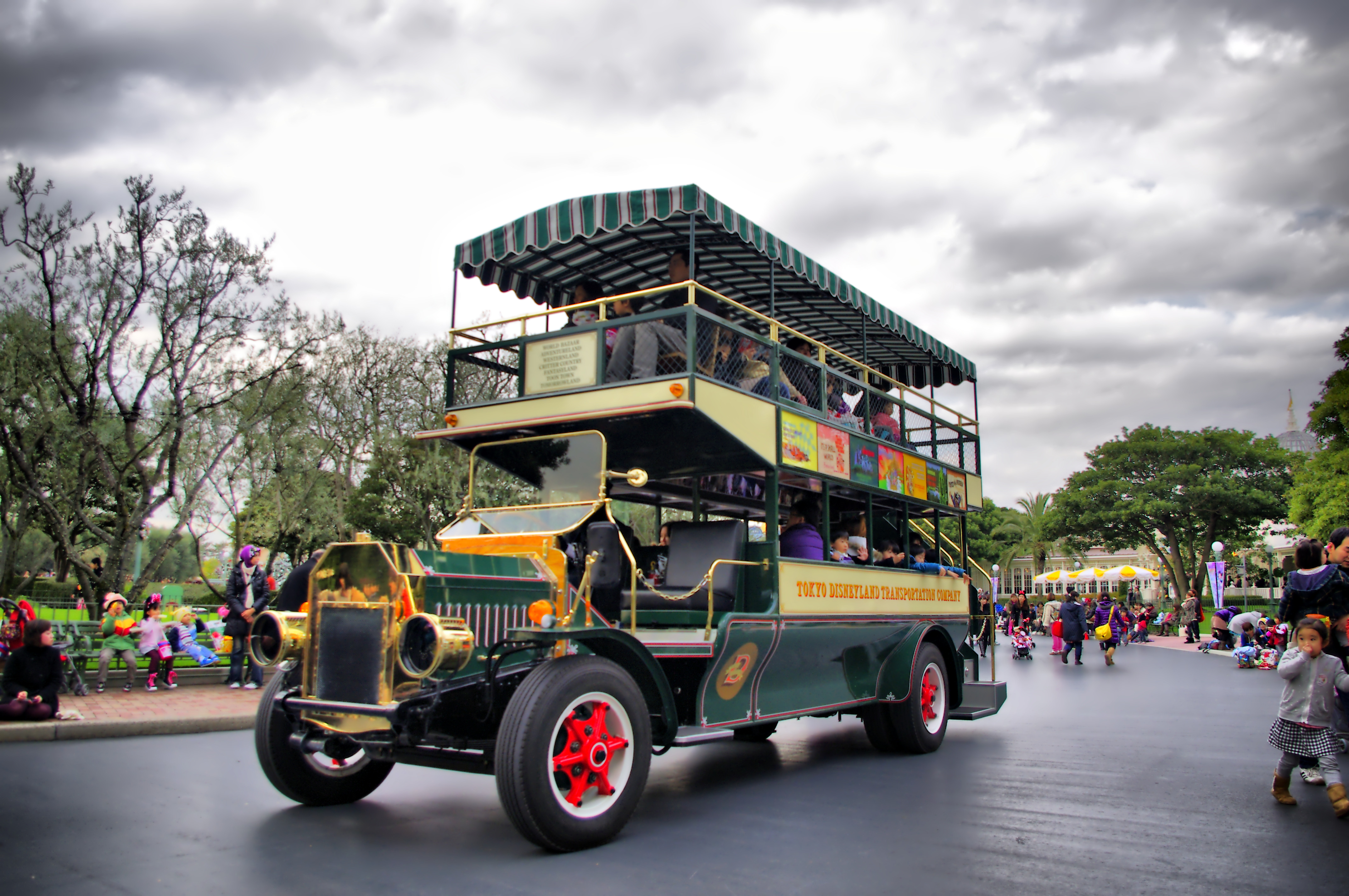
Omnibus in Tokyo Disneyland

The Omnibus attraction in Tokyo Disneyland opened with the park on April 15, 1983, and is located in the World Bazaar section. The attraction takes guests on a looping tour of the Central Plaza at the park's center and as such is not used as a form of guest transport.

Vehicle type in service as of 2024:

- Omnibus

== Tokyo DisneySea ==
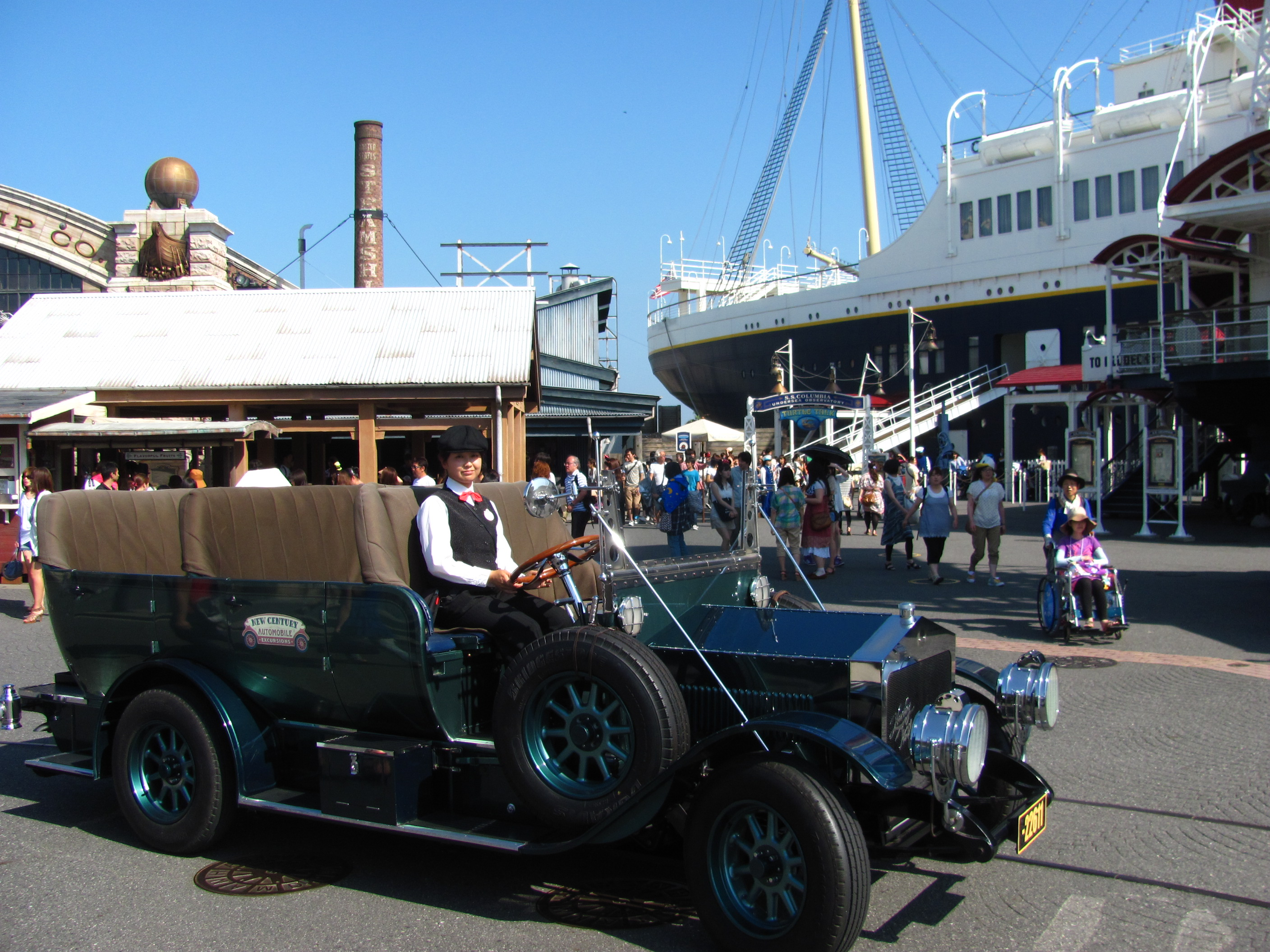
Open-top town car in Tokyo DisneySea

The Big City Vehicles attraction in Tokyo DisneySea opened with the park on September 4, 2001, and is located in the American Waterfront section. In the past, each vehicle either transported guests on one-way trips between the American Waterfront section's New York City and Cape Cod areas or took guests on a looping tour of the New York City area. Now, only the latter option is available.

Vehicle types in service as of 2024:

- Delivery truck
- Open-top town car
- Paddy wagon
- Tour bus

== See also ==
- Beamish Museum
- Douglas Bay Horse Tramway
- Heritage Park Historical Village
- Rail transport in Walt Disney Parks and Resorts
- Victor Harbor Horse Drawn Tram

== Bibliography ==
- Banks, Lisa (2015). The Unauthorized Guide to Disneyland Paris Resort 2016 (1st ed.). Pixie Dust Group, LLC. ISBN 978-1-5170-2398-0.
- Broggie, Michael (2014). Walt Disney's Railroad Story: The Small-Scale Fascination That Led to a Full-Scale Kingdom (4th ed.). The Donning Company Publishers. ISBN 978-1-57864-914-3.
- Leaphart, David (2014). Walt Disney World Railroads Part 2: Main Street Horse-Drawn Streetcar (1st ed.). Steel Wheel on Steel Rail Studio. ISBN 978-1-5007-5761-8.
- Medley, Travis (2013). Travelers Series Guide to Tokyo Disneyland & Tokyo DisneySea (2nd ed.). Travelers Series Publishing. ISBN 978-1-4912-2104-4.
- Simmons, Roger (2021). Disney World at 50: The Stories of How Walt's Kingdom Became Magical in Orlando (1st ed.). Triumph Books LLC. ISBN 978-1-62937-982-1.
- Trahan, Kendra D. (2005). Disneyland Detective: An Independent Guide to Discovering Disney's Legend, Lore, and Magic! (1st ed.). PermaGrin Publishing. ISBN 978-0-9717464-0-4.
