= Walt's – An American Restaurant =

Restaurant at Disneyland Paris

Disneyland Park (Paris)
- Area: Main Street, U.S.A.
- Status: Operating
- Opening date: April 12, 1992

Ride statistics
- Designer: Walt Disney Imagineering
- Wheelchair accessible

Walt's – An American Restaurant is a themed dining establishment located on Main Street, U.S.A. at Disneyland Paris. Paying tribute to Walt Disney, the creator of the Walt Disney Company, the restaurant is considered one of the premier dining locations at the resort, offering table service and a menu inspired by American cuisine.

== Concept ==
When designing Euro Disneyland, Imagineers wanted to create a place which would act as a tribute to Walt Disney, since European guests were not as acquainted to his life as American guests were. Imagineer Eddie Sotto wanted this place to be designed as a Club 33 for the average guests.

== The Restaurant ==
=== Ground Floor ===
- Lobby: The restaurant's lobby features many items referring to Walt and his achievements. His bust stands in the center of the room, along with devices from the early pre-animation era, such as a Zoetrope. A staircase and an elevator lead guests to the upper floor. As they ascend to it, they can see photos of Walt's reach for his fame, from the creation of Mickey Mouse and the release of Snow White and the Seven Dwarfs to the opening of Disneyland in Anaheim.

(Note: The following rooms were removed in 1999)

- Walt Disney's Room: The room paid tribute to Walt Disney's life. Here items referred to his early youth in Marceline, Missouri.
- Lillian Disney's Room: This room paid tribute to Lillian Disney, Walt's wife. Some photographs showed the couple in their journeys around Europe. The room featured an elegant fireplace (still visible today) and many china items which Lillian was fond of.
- Main Street Room: This dining room was ornamented with Imagineer Herbert Ryman's artworks for Main Street, U.S.A., and a model of the Main Street Transportation Building. The purpose of this room was to underline the link between Main Street and Marceline, Missouri.

Flower Street featured an outside seating area along the restaurant's facade.

=== Upper Floor ===
The upper floor features six themed rooms:

- Fantasyland Room: This gothic-style room presents an early vision of Fantasyland. Here are displayed artworks and sculptures representing scenes or characters from Disney movies based on European tales, such as Sleeping Beauty, Pinocchio, Peter Pan or Alice in Wonderland. Concept-arts for the Castle are also visible.
- Adventureland Room: This oriental-style room features exotic items from Africa or Asia. Artworks refer to the land's attractions such as Adventure Isle, but the influence of Imagineer Marc Davis is underlined by his sketches for the ride Pirates of the Caribbean and the never-built Jungle Cruise ride.
- Discoveryland Room: To underline Jules Verne's strong influence on Discoveryland, the room displays a huge collection of illustrations from his books Twenty Thousand Leagues Under the Seas, From the Earth to the Moon and others. The fireplace is ornamented with a golden model of the Nautilus, and photographs along the walls remind guests of the production of the Disney movie 20,000 Leagues Under the Sea. Other artworks present Tony Baxter's Discovery Bay which was the basic inspiration for the land, the now-gone Visionarium with one photograph of Michel Piccoli's portrayal of Verne, and the Orbitron ride.
- Disneyland Hotel Room: This small room features artworks for Disneyland Hotel, especially sketches which inspired the building's architecture. Nowadays, some consider this room to be Main Street Room, since the one on the ground floor was removed.
- Grand Canyon Room: This small room adjacent to the main Frontierland room displays drawings for the Grand Canyon scene visible from the Disneyland Railroad attraction.
- Frontierland Room: This library-like room bears the theme of Thunder Mesa. Here are displayed artworks of Big Thunder Mountain, Phantom Manor or Thunder Mesa Riverboats.

== Trivia ==
- The restaurant is located on 1401, Flower Street, which is also the location of Walt Disney Imagineering in Glendale, California.
- The three dining rooms located on the ground floor were removed in 1999 to make way for Lilly's Boutique, a shop themed to Lillian Disney, and designed to sell home items. Most of the props from Lillian Disney's room were reused to decorate the shop, and the fireplace still stands in this place.
- The piano and violin soundtrack of the restaurant features a wide selection of popular Disney tunes, from the beginning of the Company (Who's Afraid of the Big Bad Wolf?) to Disneyland Paris opening (Under the Sea). This soundtrack still plays in Lilly's Boutique.
