= Main Street, U.S.A. =

Themed land at Disney theme parks

- Theme: 19th-century to early 20th-century Marceline, Missouri, Fort Collins, Colorado and Classical Hollywood cinema

Disneyland
- Status: Operating
- Opened: July 17, 1955

Magic Kingdom
- Status: Operating
- Opened: October 1, 1971

Tokyo Disneyland (As World Bazaar)
- Status: Operating
- Opened: April 15, 1983

Disneyland Paris
- Status: Operating
- Opened: April 12, 1992

Hong Kong Disneyland
- Status: Operating
- Opened: September 12, 2005

Shanghai Disneyland (As Mickey Avenue)
- Status: Operating
- Opened: June 16, 2016

Main Street, U.S.A. is the first "themed land" inside the main entrance of the many theme parks operated or licensed by the Walt Disney Company around the world. Main Street, U.S.A. is themed to resemble American small towns during the early 20th century. In Tokyo Disneyland, it is called World Bazaar and covered by a glass Victorian-style conservatory roof to shield guests from the weather there. At Shanghai Disneyland, it is called Mickey Avenue and is orientated to help introduce visitors to Disney characters.

Each Main Street, U.S.A. has a train station along the park's respective Disney railroad above the entrance. The area closest to the entrance, usually just past the train station, is called Town Square.

At the other end of Main Street stands the park's centrally located castle (Sleeping Beauty Castle at Disneyland in California, Cinderella Castle at Walt Disney World and Tokyo Disneyland, Le Château de la Belle au Bois Dormant at Disneyland Park in Paris, Castle of Magical Dreams at Hong Kong Disneyland, Enchanted Storybook Castle at Shanghai Disneyland). In most of the parks, the area in front of the castle is known as The Hub or Central Plaza, while Shanghai Disneyland has the Gardens of Imagination in place of a hub/central plaza. At the Hub/Central Plaza, one will find the entrances to most of the other lands at the parks.

Town Square is home to City Hall, in which the Guest Relations office is located. Further along Main Street, the names painted in the windows on Main Street serve as credits for some of the many people, Imagineers and others, who contributed in some way to the creation of Disneyland. Largely they appear as fictional businesses (gyms, realtors, dentists), and they often refer to a hobby or interest of the person honored. Ub Iwerks's window, for example, refers to his prowess with cameras.

== Disneyland ==
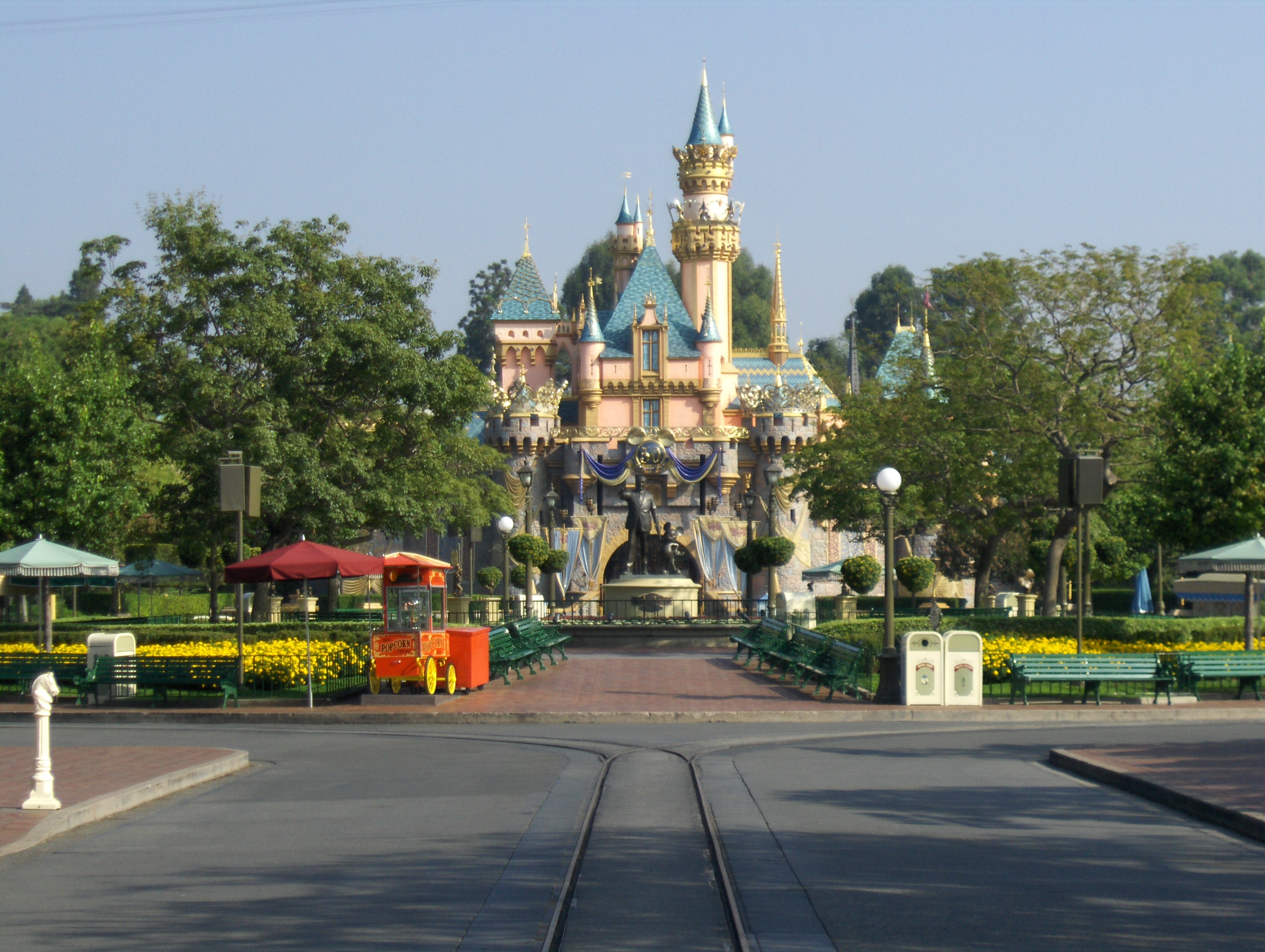
Sleeping Beauty Castle decorated for Disneyland's 50th anniversary celebration, seen from Main Street

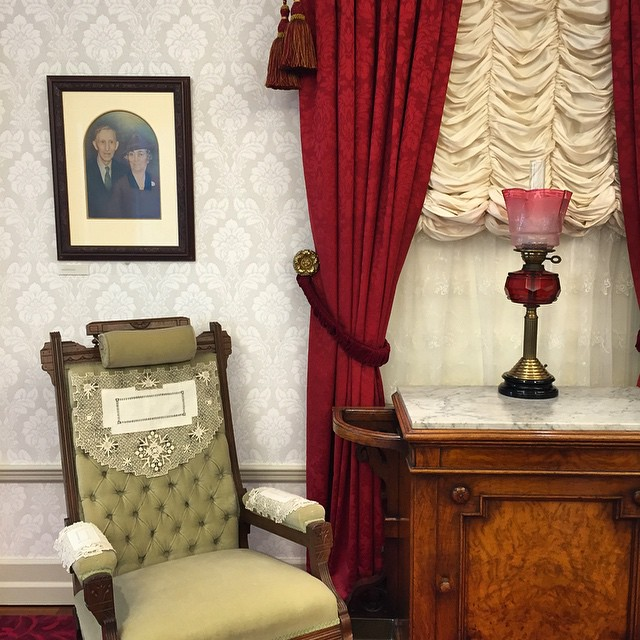
A replica of Walt Disney's apartment at the Walt Disney Family Museum

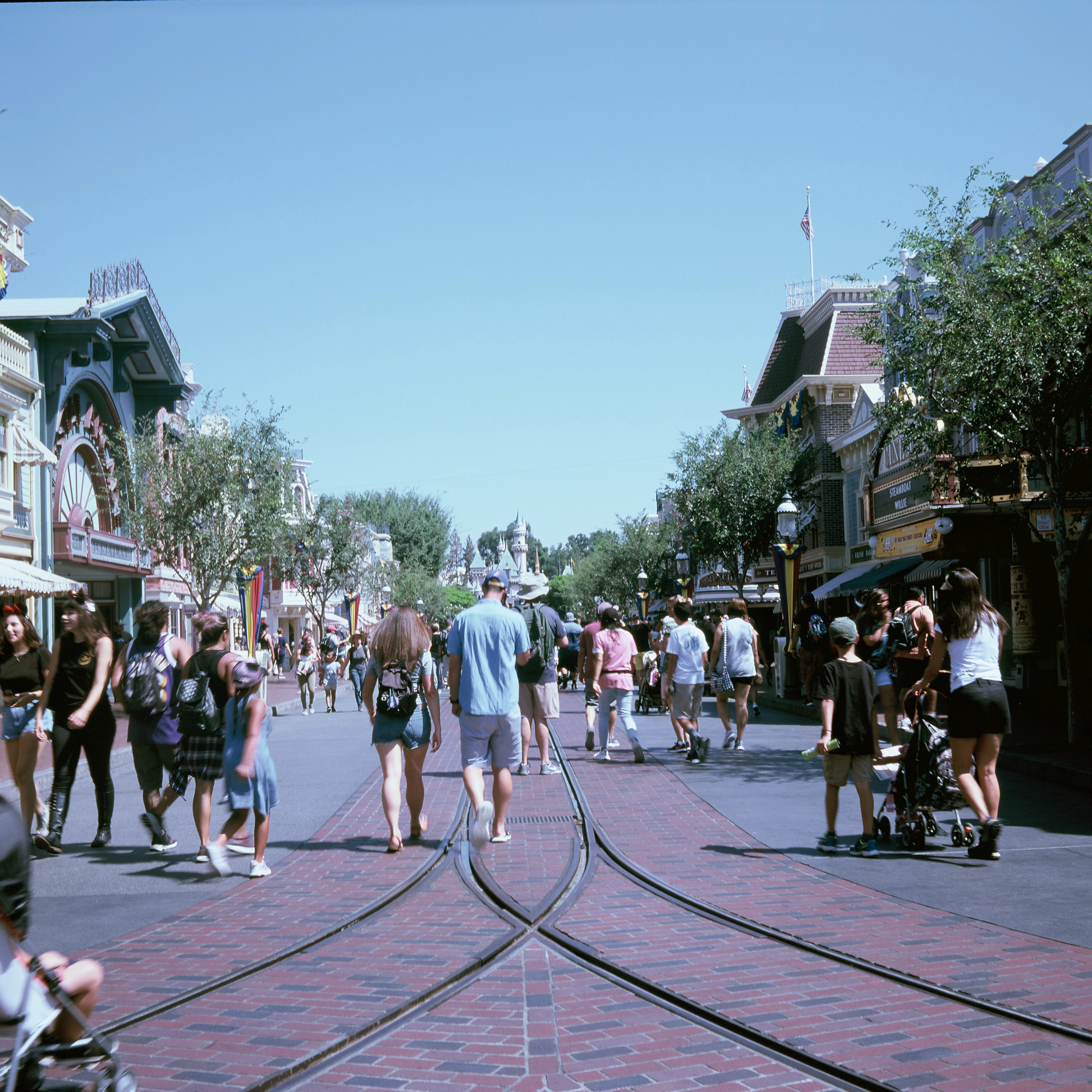
Main Street at Disneyland in August 2018

Inspired by Walt Disney's hometown of Marceline, Missouri, Main Street, USA is designed to resemble the center of an idealized turn-of-the-20th-century (c. 1910) American town. According to Harper Goff, who worked on Main Street, USA with Disney, he showed Disney some photos of his childhood home of Fort Collins, Colorado. Disney liked the look, and so many of the features of the town were incorporated into Main Street, USA. Another significant source of inspiration for the Main Street, USA concept came from the Henry Ford Museum & Greenfield Village, which Walt Disney visited twice in the 1940s.

Disney said, "For those of us who remember the carefree time it recreates, Main Street will bring back happy memories. For younger visitors, it is an adventure in turning back the calendar to the days of their grandfather's youth."

Above the firehouse in Town Square is an apartment built for Disney. He used it as a place to rest while working at Disneyland, reducing the need to travel between the park, the Walt Disney Studios in Burbank, and his home in Los Angeles. His family also used the apartment when visiting the park. Designed by set decorator Emile Kuri, the approximately 500-square-foot (46 m^{2}) apartment has a combined living and bedroom area and a small kitchenette. Its Victorian-style interior includes antiques collected by Disney.

There is a 60-foot-tall (18 m) Christmas tree during Christmas, and there is a 16-foot-high (4.9 m) Mickey Mouse jack-o-lantern on Halloween, with additional pumpkin ears. In the circular hub in front of the Sleeping Beauty Castle, the bronze "Partners" statue of Walt Disney and Mickey Mouse is surrounded by smaller bronzes of familiar Disney characters, such as Donald Duck and the White Rabbit from Alice in Wonderland.

The Main Street Opera House in Town Square is the oldest building in Disneyland. It formerly served as the park's lumber mill between 1955 and 1961. The cannons that are displayed in the center of the square were used by the French army during the 1800s, although they were never fired in battle. The gas lamps that line the street originally came from St. Louis and were bought for $.03 a pound.

Partners, sculpted by Blaine Gibson, was added in 1993. During the Halloween season, pumpkin busts for each themed land in the park, except Main Street, are seen around "Partners." It is listed as a real street in the Orange County Thomas Guide.

For Disneyland's 50th anniversary, on July 17, 2005, a first-story window on each Main Street was unveiled with a dedication to all the cast members (employees) who had worked for Disney throughout the years. The streets are paved with resilient asphalt, a type of asphalt containing rubber, to prevent aching of feet.

=== Attractions and entertainment ===
A selection of attractions is listed below.

- Disneyland Railroad (1955–present)
  - Main Street, USA Station
- Main Street Vehicles (1955–present) (a 3 ft [914 mm] narrow gauge tramway with horse-drawn streetcars is part of this attraction)
- Main Street Opera House
  - Walt Disney – A Magical Life
  - Great Moments with Mr. Lincoln
- The Disney Gallery (2009–present)
- Main Street Cinema (1955–present)
- The Dapper Dans (1959–present)

==== Seasonal entertainment ====
- Halloween Screams (2009–present)
- Disney's Celebrate America (2008–present)
- Believe... In Holiday Magic (2000–present)
- Paint the Night (2015–2016, 2025–present)
- Wondrous Journeys (2023, 2024, 2025–present)

=== Former attractions and entertainment ===
- Firehouse Five Plus Two (1955–1971)
- The World According to Goofy Parade (1992)
- The Lion King Celebration Parade (1994–1997)
- Light Magic (1997)
- Walt Disney's Parade of Dreams (2005–2008)
- Disneyland Forever (2015–2016, 2019, 2022)
- Together Forever: A Pixar Nighttime Spectacular (2018, 2024)
- Main Street Electrical Parade (1972–1996, 2017, 2019, 2022)

== Magic Kingdom ==
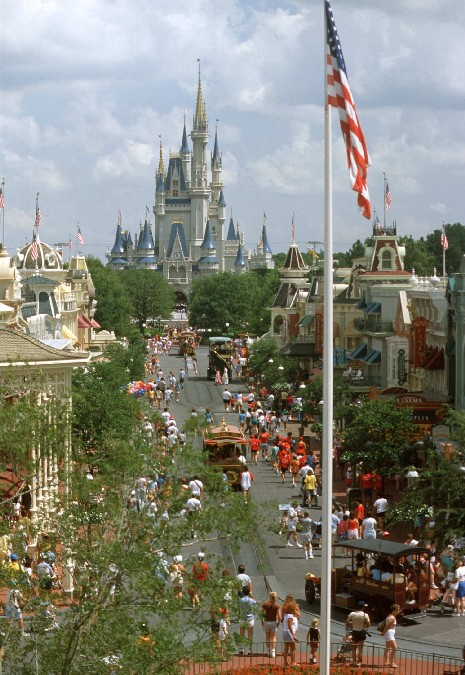
Main Street, USA in Magic Kingdom

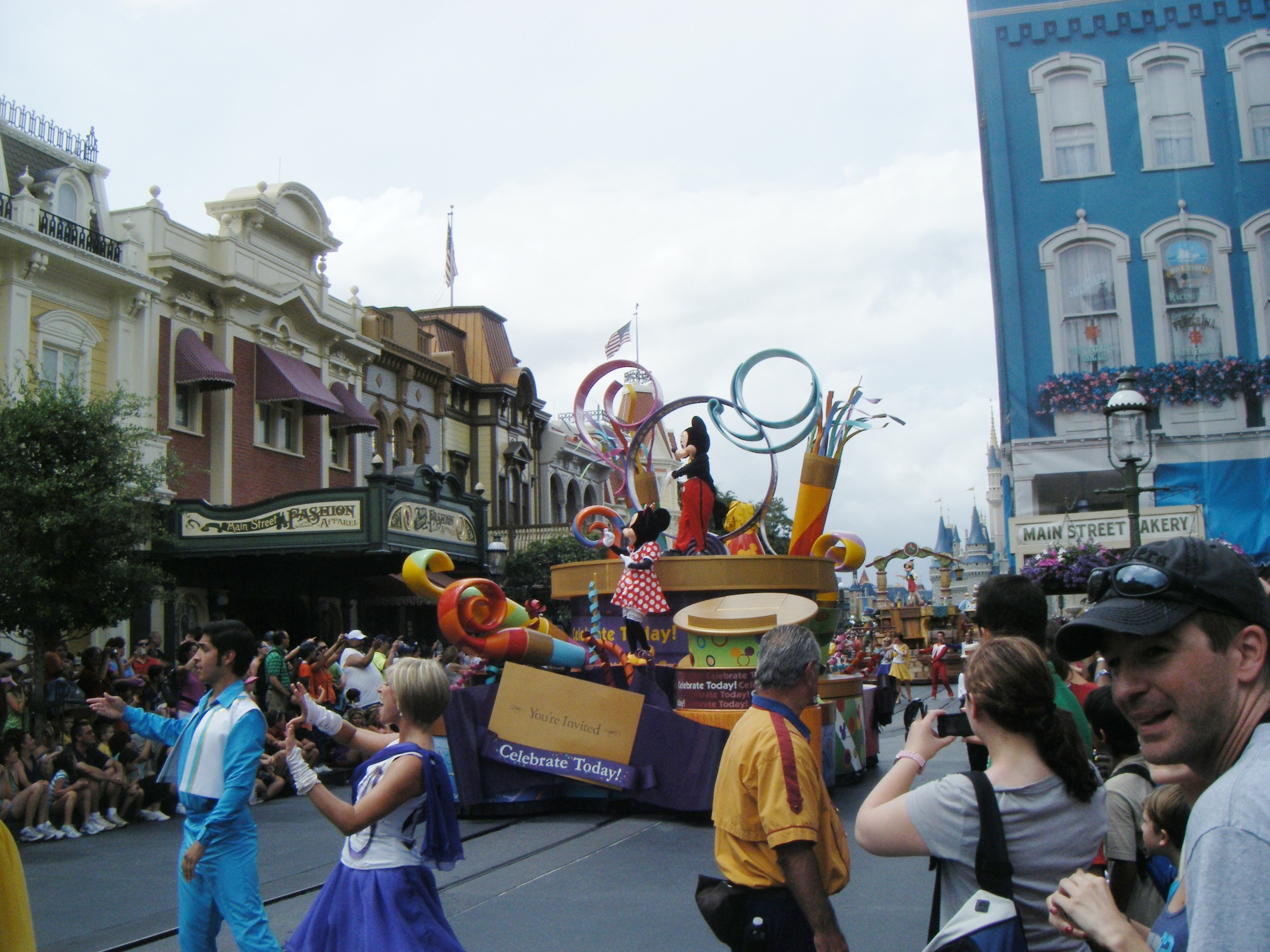
Mickey Mouse and Minnie Mouse in the Celebrate a Dream Come True Parade down Main Street, USA

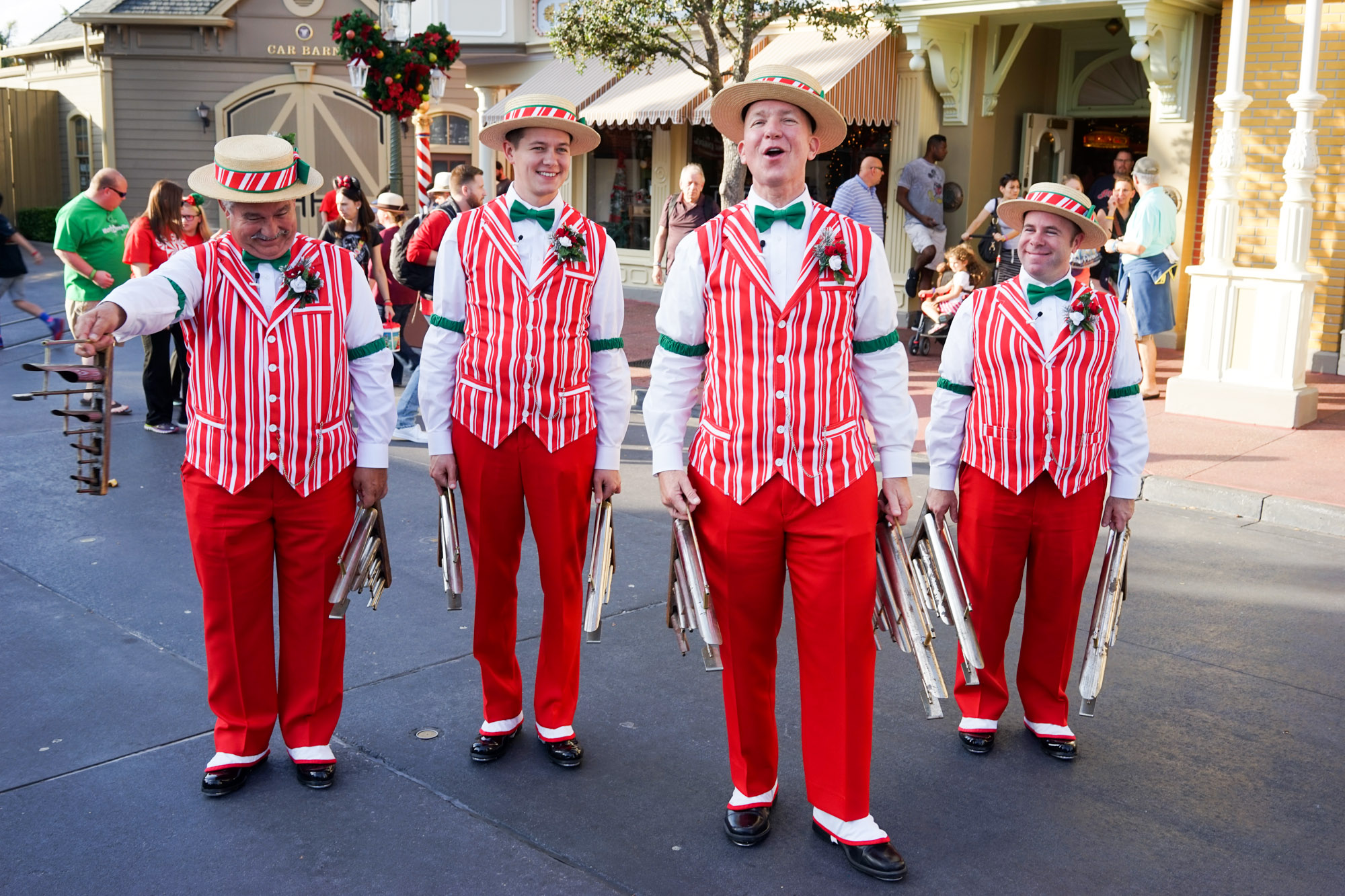
The Dapper Dans on Main Street, USA

Main Street, USA at Magic Kingdom Park is themed as an early-20th century American town, inspired by Walt Disney's childhood home of Marceline, Missouri. Symbolically, Main Street represents the park's "opening credits", where guests pass under the train station (the opening curtain) at left or right, then view the names of key personnel along the windows of the buildings' upper floors. Many windows bear the name of a fictional business, such as "Seven Summits Expeditions, Frank G. Wells President", with each representing a tribute to significant people connected to the Disney company and the development of the Walt Disney World Resort. It features stylistic influences from around the country. Taking its inspiration from New England to Missouri, this design is most noticeable in the four corners in the middle of Main Street, where each of the four corner buildings represents a different architectural style. There is no opera house as there is at Disneyland; instead, there is the Town Square Theatre. The second stories of all the buildings along Main Street are shorter than the first stories, and are offices for Walt Disney World management.

=== Attractions and entertainment ===
- Walt Disney World Railroad (1971–present)
  - Main Street, USA Station
- Main Street Vehicles (1971–present) (a 3 ft [914 mm] narrow gauge tramway with horse-drawn streetcars is part of this attraction)
- The Dapper Dans - a men's acapella singing group. (1971–present)

==== Fireworks ====
- Happily Ever After (2017–2021, 2023–present)
- Disney Enchantment (2021–2023) (2024–present; after-hours events only)

==== Parades ====
- Disney Starlight: Dream the Night Away (2025–present)

==== Seasonal entertainment ====
- Mickey's Boo-to-You Halloween Parade - Halloween themed parade shown during Mickey's Not-So-Scary Halloween Party. (1999–2004, 2005–present)
- Fantasy in the Sky - New Year's Eve fireworks shown December 30 and 31 of any year. (1999–2000, 2007–present)
- Disney's Celebrate America (2008–present)
- Mickey's Most Merriest Celebration - A live show performed on the Cinderella Castle stage during Mickey's Very Merry Christmas Party (2016–present)
- Disney's Not So Spooky Spectacular! - Halloween themed fireworks shown during Mickey's Not-So-Scary Halloween Party (2019–present)
- Minnie's Wonderful Christmastime Fireworks - Christmas themed fireworks shown during Mickey's Very Merry Christmas Party (2019–present)
- Mickey's Once Upon a Christmastime Parade - Christmas themed parade shown during Mickey's Very Merry Christmas Party (1994–2006, 2007–2019, 2021–present)

=== Former attractions and entertainment ===
==== Fireworks ====
- Fantasy in the Sky (1971–2003)
- The Magic, the Memories and You (2011–2012)
- Celebrate the Magic (2012–2016)
- Wishes: A Magical Gathering of Disney Dreams (October 9, 2003 – May 11, 2017)
- Happy HalloWishes: A Grim Grinning Ghosts' Spooktacular in the Sky (2005–2018)
- Once Upon a Time (2016–2020)

==== Parades ====
- SpectroMagic (October 1, 1991 – May 21, 1999) (April 2, 2001 – June 4, 2010)
- Main Street Electrical Parade (June 11, 1977– September 14, 1991) (May 21, 1999 – April 1, 2001) (June 6, 2010 – October 9, 2016)

==== Other attractions ====
- Swan Boats (May 20, 1973-August 1983)

== Tokyo Disneyland ==
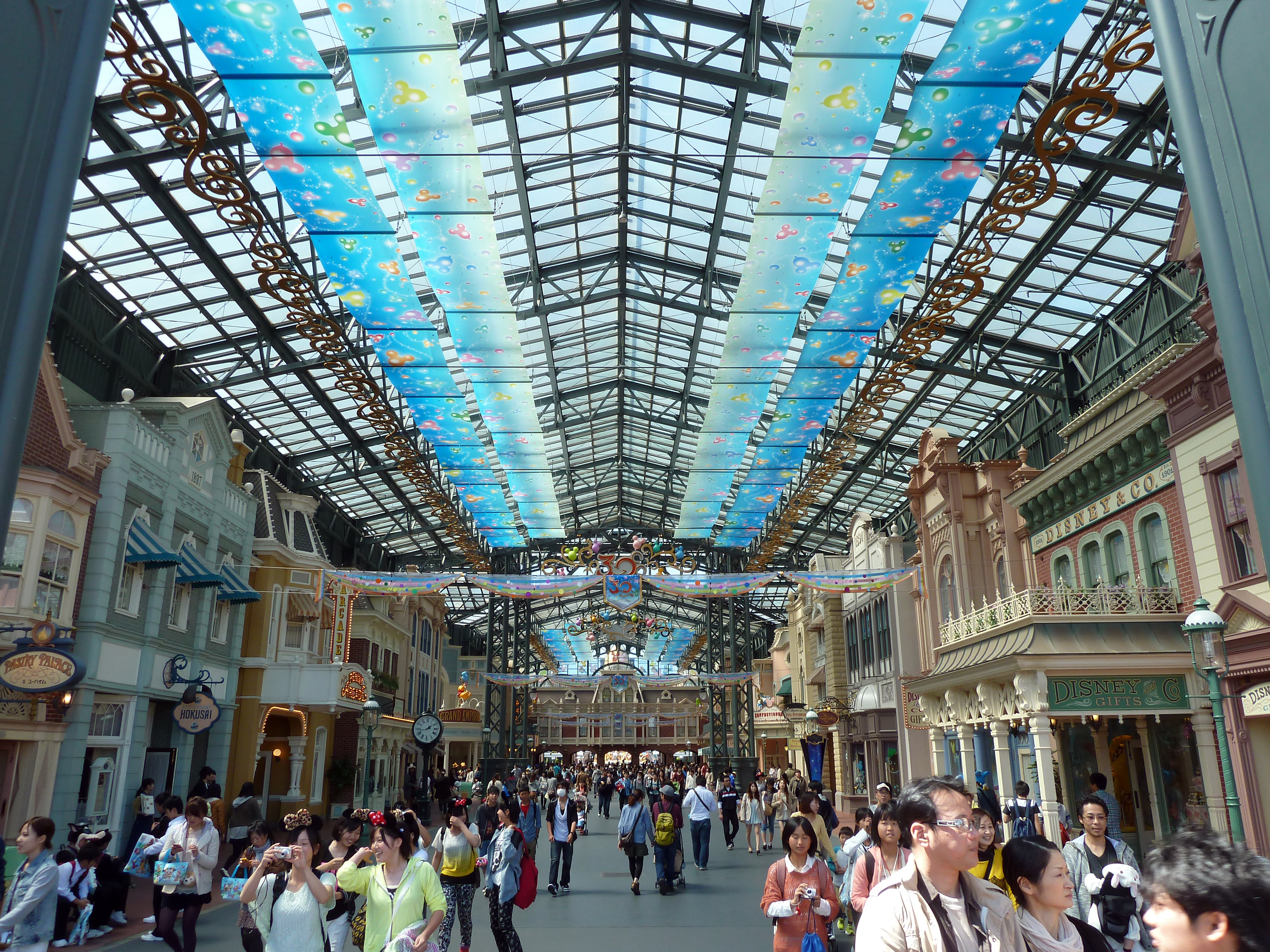
World Bazaar in Tokyo Disneyland

The World Bazaar is the alternative of Main Street, USA. It is covered by a glass Victorian-style conservatory roof to shield guests from the Japanese weather. Amongst others, World Bazaar features a 1920s American Art Deco styled restaurant. World Bazaar features the most eateries out of the "Main Streets", with three table service restaurants (four including Club 33). There is also a larger side street called "Center Street" that runs across Main Street which exits on either side into Tomorrowland and Adventureland. This was the first "Main Street" that did not have a train station (the other "Main Street" being in Shanghai Disneyland.) World Bazaar is also home to Tokyo Disneyland's Club 33.

=== Attractions and entertainment ===
- Omnibus

=== Former attractions and entertainment ===
- Main Street Cinema
- The Disney Gallery

== Disneyland Park (Paris) ==
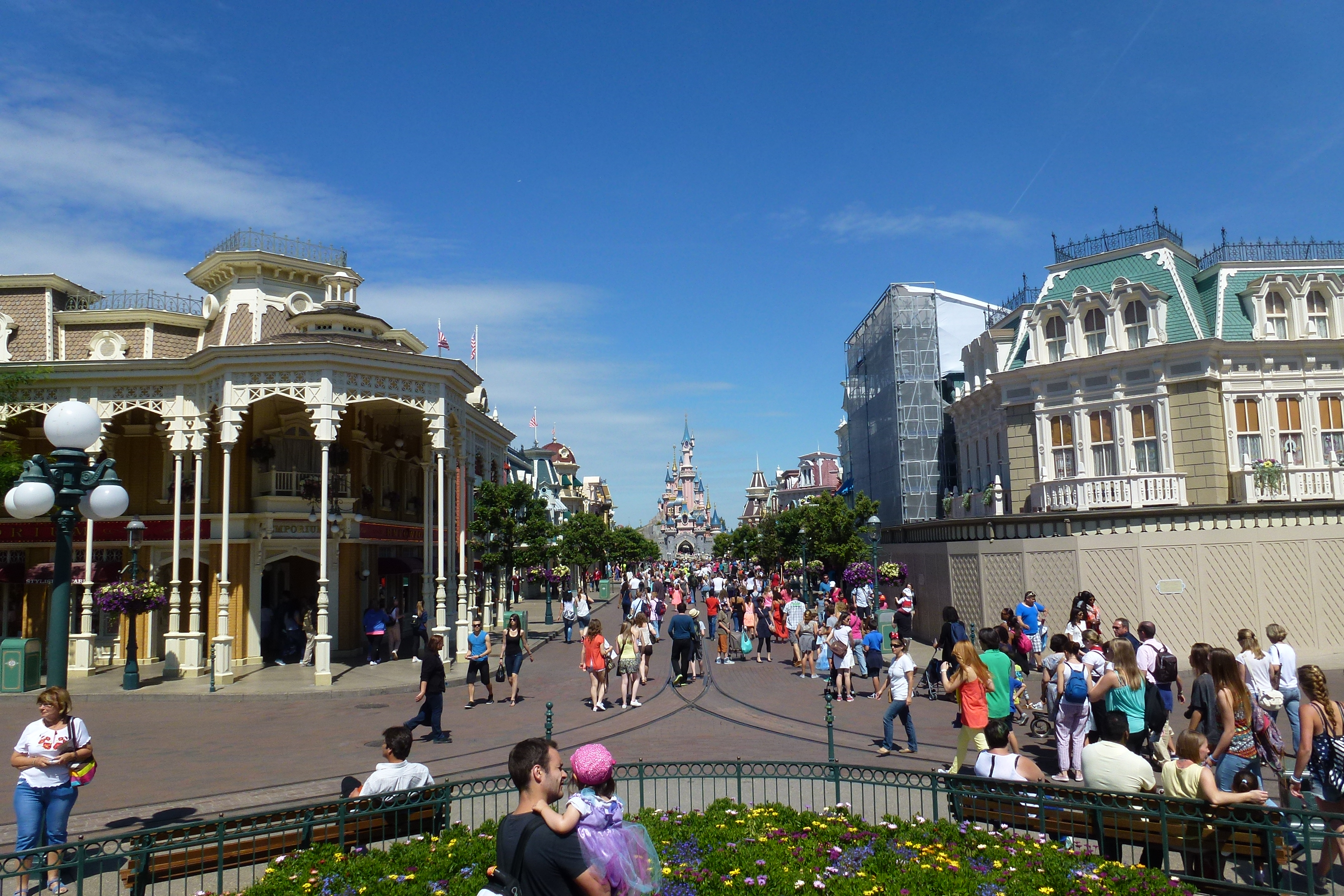
Main Street, USA in Disneyland Park (Paris)

This street is an almost exact copy of the street in Florida, though Town Square is different. It is influenced by New York city architecture. The original idea was going to be a new approach, completely different from the other versions. Themed to America in the 1920s rather than turn-of-the-century, influenced by the jazz era, cinema, flapper, gangsters, and Art Deco architecture. An era that fascinated Europeans. Attractions would include a 360° cinema, a speakeasy, and an elevated tramway to fit with the 1920s theme instead of horse-drawn trolleys and Victorian vehicles. Eventually the whole idea was scrapped, only Main Street Motors, with the large billboards on top of it, is one of the few remaining elements of it.

Due to often cold, rainy weather in the area, the Imagineers created covered walkways on either side of Main Street called "arcades". There is the "Discovery Arcade" on the side closest to Discoveryland, and the "Liberty Arcade" on the side closest to Frontierland. These provide access to all of the shops along the length of Main Street, while giving shelter from the weather. They also provide a passageway when the street is crowded during parades and fireworks.

=== Attractions and entertainment ===
- Disneyland Railroad – Main Street Station (1992–present)
- Main Street Vehicles (1992–present)
- Horse-Drawn Streetcars (1992–present) (3 ft [914 mm] narrow gauge tramway)
- Disney Stars on Parade (2017–present)
- Liberty Arcade (1992–present)
- Discovery Arcade (1992–present)

=== Restaurants and refreshments ===
- Walt's – An American Restaurant

== Hong Kong Disneyland ==
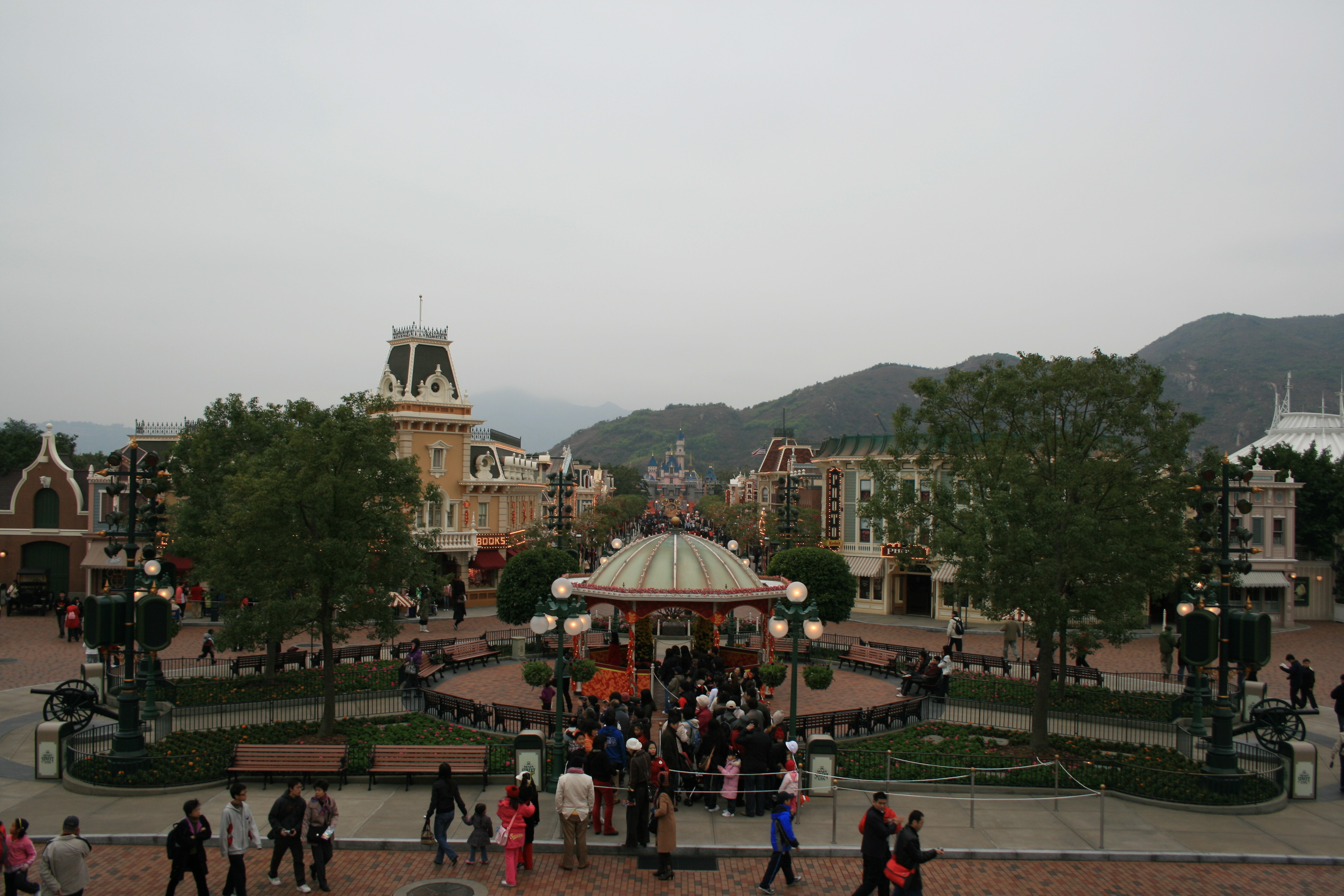
Main Street, USA in Hong Kong Disneyland

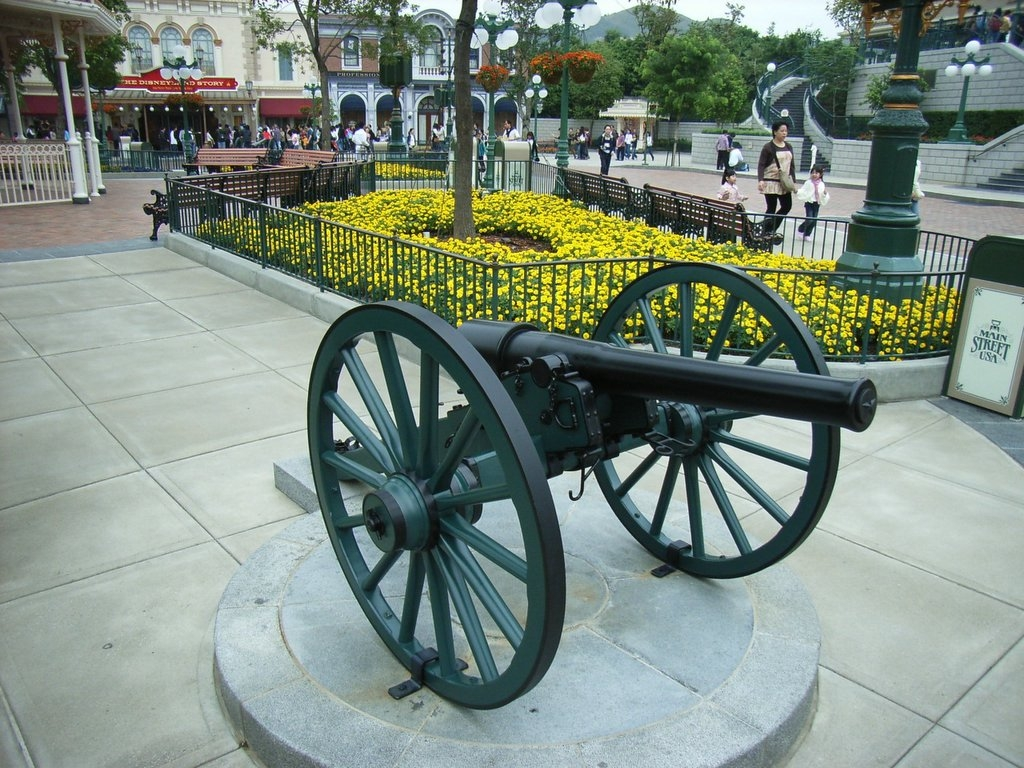
A cannon located at the Town Square of Hong Kong Disneyland

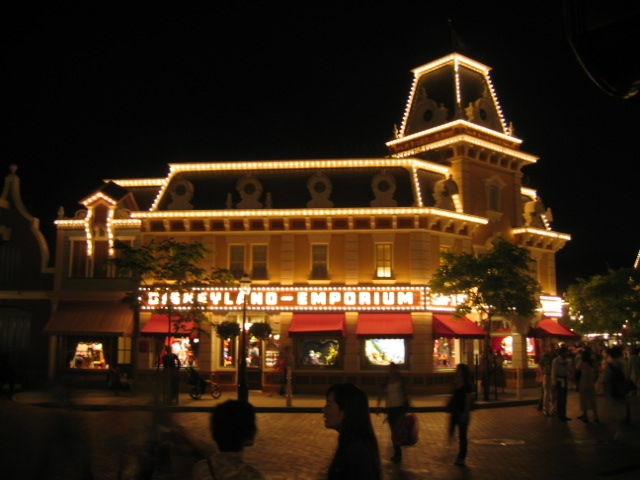
Emporium at night

Inspired by the main street in Disneyland, the buildings of this Main Street are almost identical to those in Anaheim. Like other main streets, Hong Kong Disneyland's Main Street, USA serves as the entrance of the park. Plans originally featured a restaurant under the Hong Kong Disneyland Railroad station, but were scrapped due to budget reasons. Unlike Main Streets from other parks, Main Street at Hong Kong Disneyland is built mainly of concrete and fiberglass instead of wood. This was done so to protect the buildings better from the inclement weather.

The decor is 20th-century small-town America from about the years 1890–1910. Though being very similar to Anaheim's main street, the story of this street is heavily influenced by European immigrants. Plaza Inn has the same exterior design as the one in Anaheim but its theme is about a wealthy American couple who traveled to Hong Kong, fell in love with its culture and cuisine, and returned to create a classical English eatery filled with all the decorations they collected on their journeys. The Market House Bakery was founded by a Viennese pastry chef who brought some of the world's most famous desserts and coffee cakes from the Austrian imperial court. There are no horse-drawn streetcars on this street, although tracks for the streetcars can be seen from early conceptual arts.

In early August 2008, The Disneyland Story presenting How Mickey Mouse Came to Hong Kong was closed. It was re-themed to Art of Animation on August 31. On January 21, 2011, a new shop named Center Street Boutique was opened. On August 21, 2012, a new shop named Victorian Collection was opened, between Emporium and Centennial Hall.

=== Attractions and entertainment ===
- Animation Academy (2007–present)
- Hong Kong Disneyland Railroad - Main Street Station (2005–present)
- Main Street Vehicles

=== Former attractions and entertainment ===
- The Dapper Dans (2007–2008)
- Turtle Talk with Crush (2008)
- Mickey's House (2008–2009)
- "Disney In The Stars" Fireworks (2005–2018)
- "Disney Paint the Night" Nighttime Spectacular (2014–2020; cancelled)
- Art of Animation (2007–2026)

== Shanghai Disneyland ==
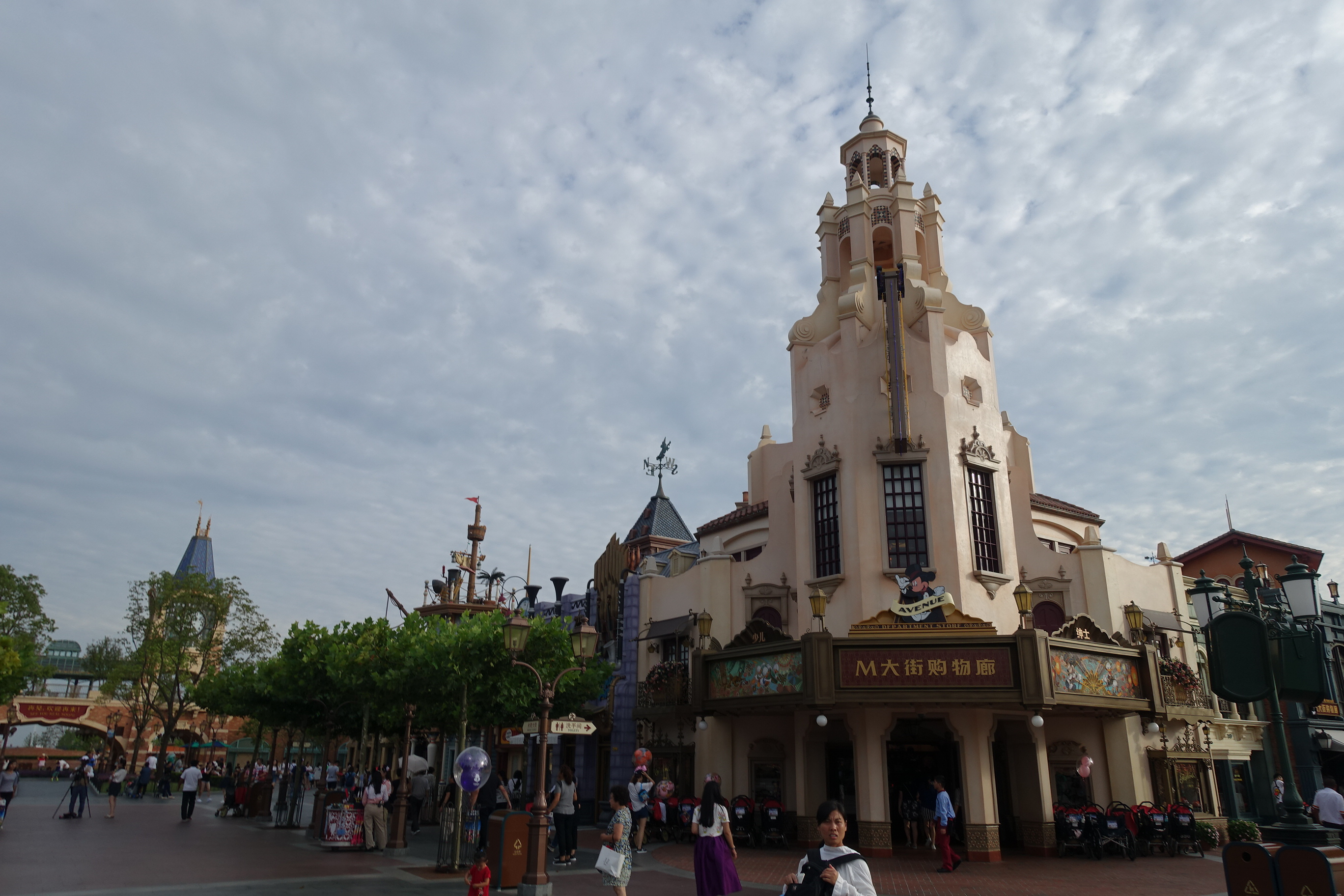
Mickey Avenue in Shanghai Disneyland

Mickey Avenue, the entrance of the Shanghai Disneyland Park, is the park's equivalent to Main Street, USA. The area is inspired by the personalities of Disney cartoon characters such as Mickey Mouse, Minnie Mouse, Donald Duck, and Chip 'n' Dale, as well as Disney films including, Ratatouille, The Three Caballeros, and Lady and the Tramp. Avenue M Arcade, the largest gift shop in the park, is modeled after the Carthay Circle Theater. The Storytellers statue, which depicts a young Walt Disney and Mickey Mouse, is located at the end of Mickey Avenue and in front of the Gardens of Imagination.

== See also ==
- American Waterfront (Tokyo DisneySea)
