= Celebrate! Tokyo Disneyland =

Nighttime show at Tokyo Disneyland

Tokyo Disneyland
- Area: Cinderella Castle
- Status: Removed
- Soft opening date: July 9, 2018
- Opening date: July 10, 2018
- Closing date: April 26, 2019
- Replaced: Once Upon a Time
- Replaced by: Reach for the Stars

Ride statistics
- Attraction type: Multimedia, water and pyrotechnics show
- Designer: Walt Disney Creative Entertainment
- Theme: Iconic moments from Disney films and park attractions
- Music: Let the Memories Begin (composed by Christopher McGovern); Various attraction soundtracks
- Duration: 19 minutes
- Host: Mickey Mouse and Goofy
- Languages: Japanese 60% English 40%
- Wheelchair accessible
- Closed captioning available

Celebrate! Tokyo Disneyland was a nighttime spectacular at Tokyo Disneyland that premiered on July 10, 2018, alongside Dreaming Up!, Let's Party Gras, and Hello, New York! as part of the 35th anniversary of Tokyo Disney Resort. The show was produced by Walt Disney Creative Entertainment, under Lead Creative Executive of Parades and Spectaculars Steve Davison.

Celebrate! Tokyo Disneyland incorporates fireworks, water cannons, flamethrowers, projection mapping, lasers, searchlights, tree lighting, and many more to depict scenes from some of Tokyo Disneyland's most famous rides and Disney films. It was created as a homage to Tokyo Disneyland and Disney parks worldwide, its lands, and its attractions, past and present. It won the Most Creative Multimedia Spectacular award from the IAAPA association at the 2018 Brass Ring awards.

== Technical details ==
Celebrate! Tokyo Disneyland features one of largest multimedia displays of any Disney theme park around the world, much similar in scale to Disneyland Forever. They utilize approximately 88 high-powered searchlights (including moat lights and turrets lights) that illuminate sky across the park, two projectors on the castle and its turrets, 87 water fountains, three lasers both in the castle and its turrets, six small flamethrowers, and new firework launch site, as well as synchronized popcorn lighting around the hub and new colorful tree lighting across the Central Plaza and Cinderella Castle that lighted up during the show. They also combined all elements that Disney has used in nighttime spectaculars at its other parks around the world.

== Lighting ==
“Celebrate! Tokyo Disneyland” features a wide array of lighting fixtures located around the park to help enchanted the show. There are two sets of 25 spotlights, each located above the two show buildings in Fantasyland. The first set is located above the show building for “Snow White’s Adventures” and “Peter Pan’s Flight”. The second set is located above the show building housing “Harmony Faire”, “Mickey’s Philharmagic”, and “Pinocchio’s Daring Adventure”. There are also an estimated 6 sets of spotlights located around the park’s central hub. The show also includes the use of lasers. There are 5 lasers in total: 3 located in the castle, and 2 more located on the two turrets superset from the castle. Also present are projectors, 6 of them. 2 are located above the buildings of “The Diamond Horseshoes”, another 2 are located above the “Tomorrowland Terrace”, and the last two are located beside each side of the castle, on the ground, disguised by foliage. The last two are used to project onto the water screens.

== Hydrotechnics ==
“Celebrate! Tokyo Disneyland” includes the use of water features such as water screens and fountains. There are 40–50 fixed water jets, 25 moving water jets, 4 sets of 3 geyser jets, and two water screens. Like all other Disney Parks that uses water fountains for their shows, it recycles water from the castle moat.

Note: As of October 2024, all the fountains have been removed.

== Pyrotechnics ==
“Celebrate! Tokyo Disneyland” also enhances the experience with the use of pyrotechnics, such as flamethrowers and fireworks. The show features 4 different launch sites for fireworks. The first launch site located above the show building for “Snow White’s Adventures” and “Peter Pan’s Flight”. The second launch site is located above the show building housing “Harmony Faire”, “Mickey’s Philharmagic”, and “Pinocchio’s Daring Adventure”. The third site is split into several different sites, all located on the roofs of the castle. The last site is located in front of the castle, behind the main ramps leading to the castle. There are also a total of 8 flamethrowers present during the show. The first 6 flamethrowers are located in front of the castle, 3 flanking each side of the bridge, and two large scale flamethrowers located above the 2 non-connecting turrets in front of the castle.

Note: As of 2024, the castle front launch site has been removed. The two launch sites above the show buildings have also been reduced in size.

== Show summary ==
Much like Disneyland's fireworks spectacular Remember... Dreams Come True and World of Color: Celebrate! at Disney California Adventure, Celebrate! takes park guests on “an unforgettable journey around the Kingdom of Dreams and Magic”. With Mickey Mouse as conductor, guests will find themselves in an “amazing musical fantasy” as the park's lands come to life.

Soundtrack elements from Remember... and other Disney Parks nighttime spectaculars were rescored for the show. It also features a theme song rewritten from “Let the Memories Begin” – the theme song from former nighttime show The Magic, the Memories and You (the original song was composed by Christopher McGovern) – and was performed by former Disneyland cast member, stage actress and singer Eden Espinosa.

Same as previous projection show Once Upon a Time, to avoid overcrowding problems, the show features lottery ticket systems for special viewing areas.

=== Opening ===
Star Tours during Celebrate! Tokyo Disneyland nighttime spectacular as lasers lighting up the castle

- Introduction: In a similar fashion to Mickey's PhilharMagic and the Mickey Mouse Revue, the orchestra tunes up with Goofy getting everybody ready before Mickey Mouse (with new look since March 26) makes his appearance on the castle balcony to conduct the show after the magic brooms from Fantasia (appearing as shadows) clean up the turrets. He then leads the orchestra into a powerful overture (featuring Tokyo Disneyland is Your Land).
- Let the Memories Begin: Taken from The Magic, the Memories and You, a montage of many of the park's attractions plays, including It's a Small World, the Primeval World, Tom Sawyer Island, Splash Mountain and Peter Pan's Flight among others. Eventually, the music carries Mickey away on his music book to journey through the different realms of the park.

=== Adventureland ===
- Walt Disney's Enchanted Tiki Room: Inspired by Aloha e Komo Mai!, Stitch appears throughout the performance of The Tiki, Tiki, Tiki Room before crashing the party and starting a storm.
- Jungle Cruise: Mickey pilots a Jungle Cruise boat through the rivers of Adventureland as the music builds into an instrumental version of Circle of Life, with characters from The Lion King and The Jungle Book appearing on the castle.
- Pirates of the Caribbean: As Mickey rides a boat through the attraction, a montage of moments from the attraction plays set to the music of He's a Pirate before cannon blasts end the scene. Recycled soundtrack from Happily Ever After but much of the music is re-arranged.

=== Westernland ===
- Mark Twain Riverboat: Mickey pilots the steamboat along the Rivers of America to the sound of an instrumental arrangement of Just Around the Riverbend from Pocahontas.
- Big Thunder Mountain Railroad: Reusing Remember's former Frontierland audio segment but with country-western style music, Mickey drives a runaway mine train accompanied by the Country Bears, with the sound of Little Oscar's horn ending the segment.

=== Fantasyland ===
- Carousel Princess Montage: As Mickey and Minnie ride the Castle Carousel, a reprise of Let the Memories Begin leads into a montage of many Disney films, featuring Snow White and the Seven Dwarfs, Sleeping Beauty, Beauty and the Beast, and Cinderella.
- The Haunted Mansion: In the stretching room, Mickey dons a top hat and a mischievous grin as the various happy haunts appear on the castle, with Mickey playing the pipe organ. While the sequence follows a similar structure to Remember's version, much of the music is re-arranged.

=== Critter Country and Toontown ===
- Splash Mountain: As the Haunted Mansion sequence ends, Mickey finds himself on a log to take the plunge down into the Briar Patch.
- Mickey's Toontown: After Mickey drops from Splash Mountain, he finds himself floating down into Toontown by balloons and drives the Jolly Trolley before being pulled into the Gag Factory, where he conducts firework launches by baton, is pulled into a whirlwind, and finally drops on a TNT lever. Reuses the music from Remember's Fantasyland/Critter Country/Toontown montage.

=== Tomorrowland ===
- Tomorrowland's Past: Mickey drifts into the spacey realm of Tomorrowland to the sounds of an area music re-arrangement of Miracles from Molecules while attraction posters for many Tomorrowland attractions from Disney parks worldwide past and present drift by, including the extinct Star Jets and Meet the World attractions. Eventually, Mickey sees the attraction poster for Buzz Lightyear's Astro Blasters and dives in.
- Buzz Lightyear's Astro Blasters: The battle between Buzz Lightyear and Zurg seen in the attraction plays out to the sounds of the Toy Story 2 prologue soundtrack. Recycled soundtrack from World of Color.
- Star Tours/Star Wars: Mickey climbs aboard Star Tours: The Adventures Continue and joins the Starspeeder's escape from Star Destroyers before jumping to the under-construction Death Star and escaping to a landing pad on Coruscant. Recycled soundtrack from Star Wars: A Galactic Spectacular.

=== Fantasyland (Reprise) ===
- Popcorn: An exhausted Mickey notices a popcorn machine on Cinderella Castle and goes inside. As a reprise of "Let the Memories Begin" plays, he starts cranking it until the castle is filled with popcorn.
- It's a Small World: The popcorn falls away, revealing the facade of It's a Small World. Many characters in that style come across the castle, and the balcony opens on Tokyo Disney Resort's 35th anniversary logo. (Upon the conclusion of the anniversary celebration, the logo was replaced by an image of the enhanced castle to mirror the Tokyo Disney Resort's 35th anniversary logo)
- Finale: Mickey rides the music book through all of the park's lands in an ending montage. He is then seen again on the castle balcony to say goodbye, culminating in a final blast of water, light and fireworks.

== See also ==
- Disneyland Forever
- Together Forever – A Pixar Nighttime Spectacular
- Happily Ever After
- Disney Enchantment (uses a scenes similar to Disneyland Forever and Celebrate! Tokyo Disneyland for its opening and ending in 2022)
- Remember... Dreams Come True
- World of Color – Celebrate!
