= Imagine... A Fantasy in the Sky =

Former fireworks show at Disneyland

Disneyland
- Area: Sleeping Beauty Castle; Main Street U.S.A.
- Status: Removed
- Opening date: June 1, 2004
- Closing date: April 30, 2005
- Replaced: Believe... There's Magic in the Stars
- Replaced by: Remember... Dreams Come True

Ride statistics
- Attraction type: Fireworks spectacular
- Designer: Walt Disney Creative Entertainment
- Duration: 9–10 minutes
- Wheelchair accessible

Imagine... A Fantasy in the Sky was a fireworks show at the Disneyland Resort in Anaheim, California that ran from June 1, 2004 to April 30, 2005. It was a relatively small show intended to bridge the gap between two of Disneyland's most extravagant fireworks shows of all time: Believe... There's Magic in the Stars and Remember... Dreams Come True. In November 2004, Imagine was performed at the Rivers of America due to the refurbishment of Sleeping Beauty Castle.

Imagine was created by Disneyland's in-house entertainment department while Walt Disney Creative Entertainment was in the process of developing Remember... The show contained elements of Fantasy in the Sky, Disneyland's fireworks show from 1958–October 1999, and Believe, the show from early 2000–May 2004 with music and arrangements from both Walt Disney World's Share a Dream Come True Parade and the 100 Years of Magic Celebration. Imagine replaced with Fantasy in the Sky during Spring Break 2005 for two weeks before Remember... made its debut.

Imagine was also the first Disneyland fireworks show to employ pneumatic launch technology. This technology uses compressed air instead of gunpowder to launch shells into the air, thus resulting in reduced pyrotechnic fallout into the park and surrounding residential neighborhoods.

== The show ==
The show opens with The Second Star to the Right, and narration:

"Since the beginning of time the stars have inspired us to wonder, and to open ourselves to the beauty that sparkles within our imagination, for imagination keeps us young at heart, and remind us that dreams can come true, so gaze up to the shimmering stars to that magical place, that only you can imagine".

Then the "Fantasy" Suite from the Share a Dream Come True Parade and "When you Wish Upon a Star" plays followed by a narration:

"Dreams can come true, and when you share them ... imagine the possibilities". Then the following songs are performed:

- Someday My Prince Will Come
- So This Is Love
- Once Upon A Dream
- Chim Chim Cher-ee
- Part Of Your World
- Beauty And The Beast
- Just Around The Riverbend
- Circle Of Life
- A Whole New World

At the end, "Share a Dream Come True" plays and Tinkerbell flies over Sleeping Beauty Castle. The show ends with a plethora of white fireworks and some other loud shells.
