= Disney's Celebrate America =

Fireworks spectacular at Disney parks

Magic Kingdom
- Status: Operating
- Opening date: July 3, 2008

Disneyland Resort
- Status: Operating
- Opening date: July 4, 2008 (Disneyland); July 1, 2011 (Disney California Adventure)

Ride statistics
- Attraction type: Fireworks, multimedia, and hydrotechnic show (depending on parks)
- Designer: Disney Live Entertainment
- Theme: American patriotism
- Duration: 15 minutes (2008–2019); 13 minutes (2022–present); 9 minutes (Disneyland abridged version; 2009–2017); 4:30 minutes (Disney California Adventure); 3:51 minutes (Disneyland alternate ending version)
- Cost: $9,000 – $12,000
- Wheelchair accessible

Disney's Celebrate America is a seasonal fireworks show that premiered on July 3, 2008, at the Magic Kingdom theme park at Walt Disney World, on July 4 of that same year at Disneyland, and on July 1, 2011, at Disney California Adventure. The 15-minute (then 13 minutes since 2022) show, produced by Disney Live Entertainment under creative director Steve Davison, celebrates the traditions, spirit and music of the United States of America, and is shown in lieu of the regular fireworks shows on both July 3 and 4 at the three parks. While these parks use the same soundtrack, the fireworks used are different, due to Anaheim and Orlando's fireworks laws being more strict. This is the first time in history that Disneyland, Magic Kingdom, and Disney California Adventure share similar fireworks shows (although Disney California Adventure's version is shorter than Disneyland and Magic Kingdom parks).

== History ==
Two previews of the show at the Magic Kingdom were held on June 29 and July 1, 2008. The show at Magic Kingdom uses all perimeter firework sites, giving a 360-degree effect from inside the park, with more than 1500 shells launched in the show. Previously, at Magic Kingdom, a special Independence Day-themed version of Fantasy in the Sky was held on July 4.

During its debut on July 4, 2008, the Disneyland version of the show was canceled 11 minutes into the performance due to debris falling on Ball Road behind Disneyland from winds at high elevation. Starting with the 2009 show until 2017, Disneyland has performed four showings of the display. A shortened 9-minute version of the display is shown July 1–3, while the full 15-minute version is shown on July 4.

In 2011, Disneyland version was updated to include some new pyrotechnics, new castle lighting, Gobo projections and searchlights used for Magical and Halloween Screams into the show. Also in the same year, Disney California Adventure introduced its own version for the show into World of Color pre-show.

In 2013, as part of Limited Time Magic, the show was performed July 1–7 at both Magic Kingdom and Disneyland parks. For the Magic Kingdom performances, the 180-degree perimeter effect was used on the July 1–2 and 5–7 shows while the full 360-degree perimeter fireworks were shown on both July 3 and 4. At Disneyland, the full display was shown on July 4, while the remaining performances featured the 9-minute abridged version. This version was significantly shorter than the standard summer show at the time and tabs were kept on guest commentary, eventually leading to a single night performance beginning in 2019.

Since 2015, the Disneyland version began utilizing the searchlights used for Disneyland Forever, with the projection technology being added in 2017.

In 2019, there were some changes for both shows in Magic Kingdom and Disneyland. For the Magic Kingdom version, the show has returned with the increased amount of pyrotechnics in Cinderella Castle. For the Disneyland version, the show has returned with the increased amount of small-sized firework shells on the rooftops of It's a Small World & Mickey & Minnie's Runaway Railway.

In 2022, as part of Disney's continued Diversity and Equity initiatives through Disney Parks and Resorts, a female narrator was added to the production with slightly altered narrations. The show also cut select songs from act two of the "folk song" segments that upper management red-flagged as "problematic".

In 2023, the Disneyland version saw the pyrotechnic elements at the rooftop of the castle were cut and replaced by increase of 9-line pyrotechnics elements on the rooftops of It's a Small World and Mickey & Minnie's Runaway Railway. Additionally, the searchlights used for Wondrous Journeys began being utilized for the It's a Small World promenade area.

On May 19, 2026, it was announced that the Magic Kingdom version of the seasonal fireworks show will return on July 3–5, 2026, as part of Disney's celebration of the United States Semiquincentennial.

== The Show ==
=== Introduction ===
As the lights dim, the sounds of animals and Native American drums can be heard. A male voice (Corey Burton) narrates the show. Beginning in 2022, an unknown female voice narrates the show.

Male narrator (2008–2019) and Female narrator (2022–present): America! A land where eagles soar! Since history began, its people have celebrated the magnificence of this land. Tonight we celebrate America; a land of many people. A country that continues to grow. A nation of courage and independence. America, the beautiful!

Music: Celebrate America! Theme

=== Celebrate Freedom and Independence ===
Male narrator (2008–2019): To honor Independence Day, we welcome you to our Fourth of July celebration as we commemorate the birthday of this great nation. With joy, we celebrate the United States of America; a vast mosaic of individuality and inspiration. A vibrant palette of cultures and colors. A country whose pioneering spirit continues to live on in the hearts and minds of people who cherish freedom; in this land and around the globe.

Female narrator (2022–present): In honor of the Fourth of July, we invite you to come together as we commemorate the enduring spirit of this great nation. With joy, we celebrate the United States of America; a vast mosaic of individuality and inspiration. A vibrant palette of cultures and colors. A country whose pioneering spirit continues to live on in the hearts and minds of people who cherish freedom; in this land and around the globe.

- In 2026, as part of 250th anniversary of the United States and three-day Fourth of July weekend, the narration was slightly changed as follows:

To honor America's 250th anniversary, we welcome you to our Independence Day weekend celebration, as we commemorate this momentous birthday of our great nation. With joy, we celebrate the United States of America; a vast mosaic of individuality and inspiration. A vibrant palette of cultures and colors. A country whose pioneering spirit continues to live on in the hearts and minds of people who cherish freedom across this land.

Music: "God Bless America" (Irving Berlin), "The Yankee Doodle Boy" (George M. Cohan) and "This Is My Country" (Don Raye and Al Jacobs).

=== American Folk Songs* ===
Male narrator (2008–2019) and Female narrator (2022–present): "The Spirit of America continues to inspire those who believe in their dreams. From sea to shining sea, we are proud to share all this great and beautiful nation has to offer. In the words and melodies of beloved American folk songs, that enduring spirit is found in the music of our land."

Music: "America the Beautiful" (Katharine Lee Bates and Samuel A. Ward), "This Land is Your Land" (Woody Guthrie), "Home on the Range", "Oh My Darling, Clementine" (Percy Montrose), "Oh! Susanna" (Stephen Foster), "She'll Be Coming 'Round the Mountain", "Red River Valley" and "Oh Shenandoah".

- This section is absent in the abridged version of the Disneyland display.
- In 2022, "Oh! Susanna" and "Red River Valley" were cut from both Disneyland's and Magic Kingdom's shows.

=== A Salute to the Red, White and Blue ===
Male narrator (2008–2019) and Female narrator (2022–present): Just as the fifty stars and thirteen stripes are so grandly united upon Old Glory, our nation's flag unites us all. Let us join together to give salute to the red, white and blue. And cheer the hopes and dreams that continue to shine throughout America.

Music: "You're a Grand Old Flag" (George M. Cohan), "Stars and Stripes Forever" (John Philip Sousa) and "The Star-Spangled Banner" (Francis Scott Key).

Following the "Star-Spangled Banner", the show ends in a massive display of fireworks.

==== Alternate Ending ====
In 2015 and 2016, the final segment with a different narration, was featured at the end of "Disneyland Forever", "Together Forever – A Pixar Nighttime Spectacular" in 2018, and "Mickey's Mix Magic" in 2021 as an Independence Day tag.

This different narration is led by Bill Rogers and reads the following: Friends and honored guests, we welcome you to our 4th of July celebration as we commemorate the birthday of this great nation. Let us join together as in salute to the red, white and blue, and cheer the wholesome dreams that continue to shine throughout America!
