= Remember... Dreams Come True =

Nighttime spectacular at Disneyland

Disneyland
- Area: Main Street, U.S.A. Sleeping Beauty Castle; It's A Small World; Rivers of America
- Status: Removed
- Opening date: May 1, 2005 (original); January 10, 2010 (first reopening); February 3, 2017 (second reopening); September 7, 2018 (third reopening); February 2027 (fourth reopening)
- Closing date: June 11, 2009 (original); November 2, 2014 (first reopening); April 7, 2018 (second reopening); January 17, 2019 (third reopening)
- Replaced: Imagine... A Fantasy in the Sky (2005); Magical: Disney's New Nighttime Spectacular of Magical Celebrations (summer only); Fantasy in the Sky (2017); Together Forever – A Pixar Nighttime Spectacular (2018) (Pixar Fest only); Wondrous Journeys (Disney 100th and 70th Anniversary)
- Replaced by: Magical: Disney's New Nighttime Spectacular of Magical Celebrations (summer only); Fantasy in the Sky (2015); Together Forever – A Pixar Nighttime Spectacular (2018) (Pixar Fest only)

Ride statistics
- Attraction type: Multimedia and pyrotechnic show
- Designer: Disney Live Entertainment
- Theme: Disneyland's attractions (California only); Magic Kingdom's attractions (Florida only)
- Music: Gregory Smith (original compositions and arrangements)
- Duration: 17:11 (original version); 16:19 (current version)
- Host: Julie Andrews
- Sponsor: Honda
- Wheelchair accessible
- Assistive listening available

Remember... Dreams Come True was a Disneyland fireworks display commemorating the 50th anniversary of the park in 2005 and 2006. The show featured fireworks, lower level pyrotechnics, isobar flame effects, projection mapping, lasers, searchlights, and lighting set to the soundtracks of some of Disneyland's rides and shows.

The show was produced by Disney Live Entertainment.

The show ran until November 2, 2014, when it closed to make way for the integration of a new fireworks system, and for Disneyland's Diamond Celebration, which included the return of Fantasy in the Sky and the new Disneyland Forever fireworks. The show returned on February 3, 2017, and ran until April 7, 2018, when it was relaunched to accommodate Pixar Fest and its Together Forever fireworks. The show reopened again on September 7, 2018, featuring the searchlights and projection technology developed for Disneyland Forever. Mickey's Mix Magic replaced it and opened at Disneyland on January 18, 2019. The show, though never officially renamed, is part of Disneyland's Potential Fireworks Library, alongside titles like "Disneyland Forever" and "Together Forever: A Pixar Nighttime Spectacular". "Remember...Dreams Come True" remains unique as the sole fireworks display in any Disney Park celebrating theme park attractions rather than film properties.

On August 15, 2026 at D23: The Ultimate Disney Fan Event 2026, it was announced that the updated version of the fireworks shows will return in February 2027, along with the classic World of Color show at Disney California Adventure. In addition to the projections on Sleeping Beauty Castle, the show will feature new projections at Rivers of America, the facade of “it’s a small world,” and all the way down to Main Street, U.S.A.

== Show summary ==
=== Opening ===
- Introduction – the introduction is provided by Julie Andrews. Andrews tells the audience about the importance of magic of Disneyland and the beauty of dreams, and introduces the "Wishes" fanfare and show's theme.
- When You Wish Upon a Star – Cinderella (Jennifer Hale), Snow White (Carolyn Gardner), Ariel (Jodi Benson), Peter Pan (Blayne Weaver), Pinocchio (Michael Welch), and Aladdin (Scott Weinger) all share their dreams and fondest wishes, accompanied by musical motif from their respective films: "A Dream Is a Wish Your Heart Makes", "I'm Wishing", "Part of Your World", "The Second Star to the Right", "I've Got No Strings", and "A Whole New World".
- Tinker Bell's Flight – Tinker Bell flies out over Sleeping Beauty Castle as Walt Disney's original opening day dedication speech for Disneyland (and the "Wishes" theme) plays.

=== Main Street U.S.A. ===
The original announcement from the Disneyland Railroad is heard, as is the whistle and bell of DLRR #1, C.K. Holliday. Then music from Main Street, U.S.A. such as Maple Leaf Rag and Main Street Electrical Parade is heard. The "old world" segment shows the Main Street Station and American Flag bunting is projected onto Sleeping Beauty Castle. Then, the American Flag itself is projected while the stars move upon it. The Main Street Electrical Parade's closing fanfare plays and exploding multicolor stars emanate from the center of the castle.

- Music
  - Maple Leaf Rag by Scott Joplin
  - "Baroque Hoedown" written by Jean-Jacques Perrey and Gershon Kingsley
  - "Main Street Electrical Parade" arranged by Don Dorsey and Jack Wagner (electric version), and Gregory Smith (orchestral segment).
- Voices
  - Jack Wagner as the synthesized parade voice and the railroad announcer

=== Adventureland ===
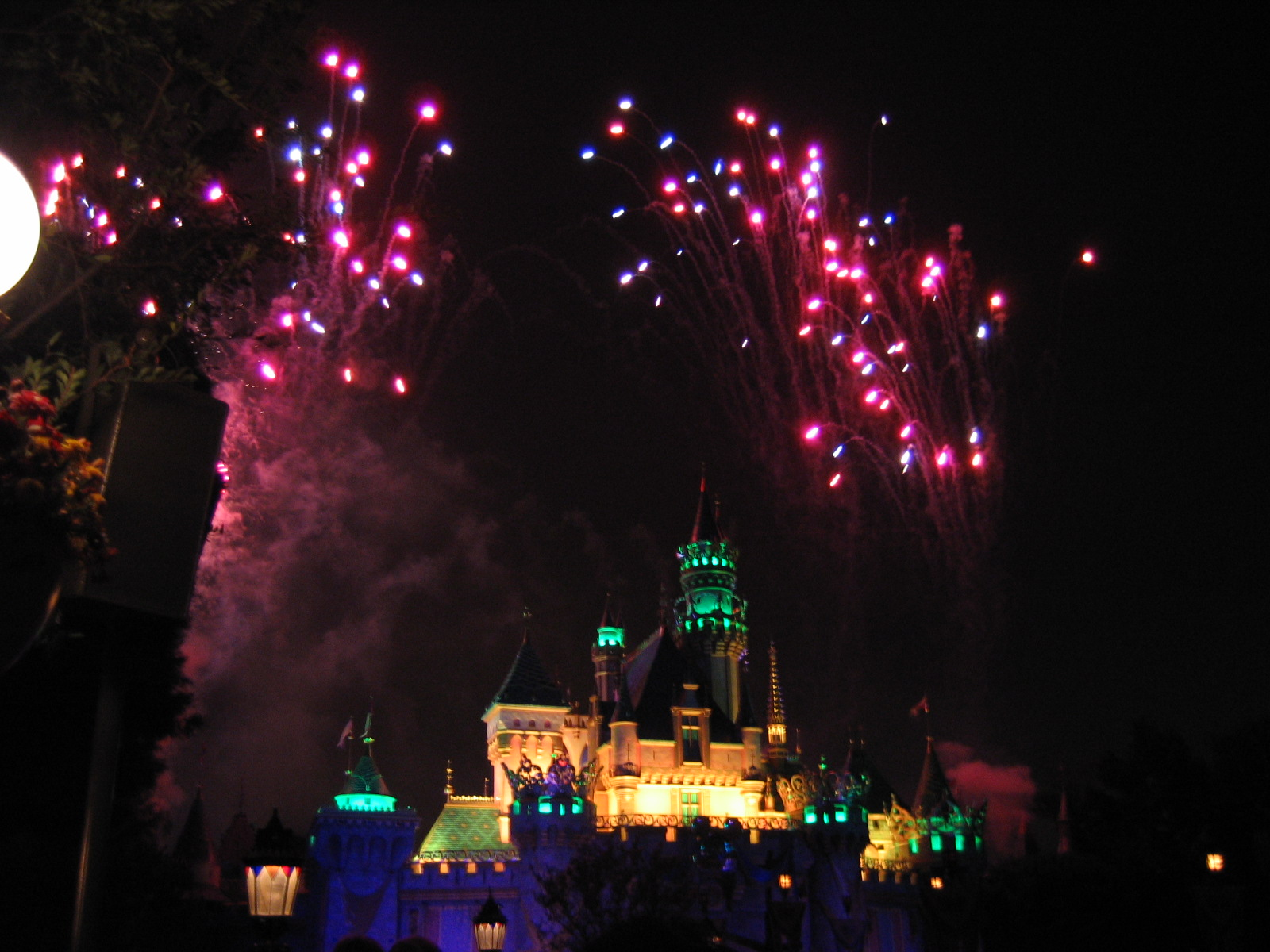
The "Enchanted Tiki Room" segment

Music from Walt Disney's Enchanted Tiki Room and the Indiana Jones Adventure are played. Colorful projections of the Tiki Room are featured on Sleeping Beauty's Castle with the birds featured in that attraction. During the Indiana Jones segment, the eye of Mara is projected onto the Matterhorn and the snake room of Indiana Jones Adventure is projected onto the castle. This section includes pyrotechnics.

- Music
  - "The Tiki Tiki Tiki Room" (Richard M. Sherman, Robert B. Sherman)
  - "Ark Theme"/"Raider's March" (John Williams)
- Voices
  - Wally Boag as José
  - Fulton Burley as Michael
  - Ernie Newton as Pierre
  - Thurl Ravenscroft as Fritz
  - John Rhys-Davies as Sallah

=== New Orleans Square ===
Music from The Haunted Mansion and Pirates of the Caribbean are played. The exterior of the Haunted Mansion is projected onto the castle followed by the attraction's stretching room portraits. During the "Wicked Waltz", Madame Leota is projected floating around the castle as instruments are projected above her. At the end of the segment, Little Leota is projected as she says her trademark "Hurry back" spiel.

In the Pirates of the Caribbean segment of Disneyland's fireworks show, a skull image is projected onto both the castle and Matterhorn mountain. From the peak of the Matterhorn, flare fireworks were previously launched until summer 2017 when this effect was removed. Flares are now launched from the top of the "Alice in Wonderland" show building. During this segment, diagonal fireworks are set off between Fantasyland and Frontierland, creating a "cannon fight" spectacle.

- Music
  - "Grim Grinning Ghosts" (Buddy Baker, Xavier Atencio)
  - "Yo Ho (A Pirate's Life for Me)" (George Bruns, Atencio)
- Voices
  - Paul Frees as the Ghost Host, the "dead men" pirate, and the Pirate Ship Captain
  - Eleanor Audley as Madame Leota
  - Leota Toombs as Little Leota

=== Frontierland ===
Music from Big Thunder Mountain Railroad and Rivers of America is played. During the Rivers of America scene, the Mark Twain Riverboat is projected steaming across the castle.

- Songs
  - "Oh Shenandoah"
  - "The Ballad of Davy Crockett" (Until 2009) (Bruns, Tom W. Blackburn)
  - "Main Title" from The Big Country (Until 2009) (Jerome Moross)
- Voices
  - Dallas McKennon as the Prospector

Note: The Big Thunder Mountain Railroad portion of the show was removed in 2009.

=== Critter Country, Fantasyland, Toontown (Laughin' Place) ===
Music and sounds from various rides in Critter Country (known today as Bayou Country), Fantasyland, and Mickey's Toontown are heard. Attractions featured include (in order) Splash Mountain, Peter Pan's Flight, Alice in Wonderland, Casey Jr. Circus Train, Mad Tea Party, Roger Rabbit's Car Toon Spin, Country Bear Vacation Hoedown, The Many Adventures of Winnie the Pooh, It's a Small World, and America Sings.

The segment begins with Splash Mountain's vultures inquiring about the "laughing' place". The castle projects images of Splash Mountain, followed by Peter Pan and the Darling children soaring across it. The Mad Hatter and March Hare are then heard as colored bubbles are projected, followed by the projection of Casey Jr. Circus Train. Benny the Cab introduces the second half of the segment, Saxons spin next to the castle, and a spiral is projected onto it followed by a barrage of rainbow-colored lights dancing across it. Finally, the weasel says, "Pop goes the weasel", and the segment ends with a door slamming shut and everything fades to darkness.

- Music
  - Ev'rybody Has a Laughing Place (Allie Wrubel, Ray Gilbert)
  - The Unbirthday Song (Mack David, Al Hoffman, Jerry Livingston)
  - "Second Hungarian Rhapsody" (Liszt)
  - "Infernal Galop" from Orpheus in the Underworld (Jacques Offenbach)
- Voices
  - Edward Conor and John Kelfreese as the Splash Mountain vultures
  - Dallas McKennon as the maniacal laughter voice over sound effects
  - Ed Wynn as the Mad Hatter
  - Bobby Driscoll as Peter Pan
  - Margaret Wright as Casey Junior
  - Jerry Colonna as the March Hare
  - Charles Fleischer as Benny the Cab
  - Mike West as Max the Buck
  - Thurl Ravenscroft as Buff the Buffalo
  - Frank Welker as Randy the Skunk
  - Jim Cummings as Tigger
  - Jack Wagner's announcement from the Matterhorn Bobsleds: "Remain seated please. Permanecer sentados por favor!"

=== Tomorrowland ===
Sound effects, narration, projections, and music from Space Mountain, Submarine Voyage, Autopia, Rocket Jets, PeopleMover, Adventure Thru Inner Space and Star Tours are played.

Many Tomorrowland attractions and show scenes are projected onto the castle including the Rocket Jets, Submarine Voyage, Adventures Thru Inner Space, The Peoplemover, and Autopia. The main part of the segment is around Star Tours, with the logo being projected to start the scene. As the Star Wars theme plays, the effect of jumping to hyperspace is shown. Then, TIE Fighters are projected on the castle with a starry background. Green lasers are projected from the castle during this segment.

- Music
  - "Star Wars: Main Theme" (John Williams)
- Voices
  - Paul Frees as the Scientist
  - Brian Cummings as the Star Tours announcer
  - Paul Reubens as RX-24 (Rex)
  - Steve Gawley as Red Leader

=== Conclusion ===
Julie Andrews concludes by declaring Disneyland the "Happiest Place on Earth". Tinker Bell reappears, flying over the castle to the tunes of "Wishes" and "When You Wish Upon A Star". The show concludes with a dazzling fireworks display as Andrews reminds, "Remember...Dreams Come True!"

== Revisions ==
At the conclusion of the show, "Remember When", written by Richard Marx and performed by LeAnn Rimes, is played throughout the park. This song was the official song of the Happiest Homecoming on Earth, celebrating the 50th anniversary of Disneyland and Disney Parks worldwide.

Later during the second season of running the fireworks show, a second song, Wishes!, performed by Peabo Bryson and Kimberley Locke (from the album Disney Wishes!) was added to play after "Remember When". After both songs, the lands' normal area loop music returns.

Although "Remember When" and "Wishes!" are the exit music of this show, this portion was occasionally altered due to special occasions:

- Prior to the introduction of Disney's Celebrate America in 2008, there was a special Independence Day fireworks finale every July 4, namely A Salute to America's Golden Dreams, replacing two exit music(s) in their regular version. This theme song was borrowed from Epcot's The American Adventure and Disneyland's Great Moments with Mr. Lincoln attractions. This special show used a combination of former Believe and Remember... pyro equipment.
- For the 2005 holiday season, "Remember When" was replaced with the "White Christmas" segment of Believe... In Holiday Magic, complete with magical snowfall. This version of the "White Christmas" segment contained a short introduction by Julie Andrews.

In acknowledgment that Disneyland became more than 50 years old, later showings changed Julie Andrews' narration from "Fifty years ago" to "in 1955". "Fifty years later" was also dubbed over with the word "today".

== Additional information ==
This fireworks show was also used during the 2006 and 2007 Grad Nite programs. The show itself remained almost unchanged except for the soundtrack being replaced with one consisting primarily of contemporary music (different each year) and projection to match it. The show was renamed to Grad Nite Explosion for these events and ran for 10 minutes at 1:00am and 3:00am. Video screens along with additional lighting effects were also added on either side of the hub (already in place as part of Club KIIS).

The entire soundtrack to the show can be found on A Musical History of Disneyland and The Official Album of the Disneyland Resort. The soundtrack reappeared on the Official Album for the Year of a Million Dreams with new narration to coincide with the end of the 50th Anniversary. The score was arranged by Greg Smith.

The music used during the opening and finale of Remember... Dreams Come True originated from Wishes: A Magical Gathering of Disney Dreams at the Magic Kingdom at Walt Disney World in Florida, which is performed by Charity Farris.

== See also ==
- Wishes: A Magical Gathering of Disney Dreams
- Happily Ever After
- Celebrate! Tokyo Disneyland – a similar, modern version to Remember, but with different music
- Disney Dreams!
- Ignite the Dream: A Nighttime Spectacular of Magic and Light
- Disney in the Stars
- List of former Disneyland attractions
- List of Disneyland attractions
