= Disneyland Forever =

Nighttime spectacular at Disneyland

Disneyland
- Area: Main Street, U.S.A. Fantasyland; Rivers of America
- Status: Removed
- Cost: $80,000 per night
- Soft opening date: May 21, 2015 (Original); April 20, 2022 (Second reopening)
- Opening date: May 22, 2015 (Original); June 7, 2019 (First reopening); April 22, 2022 (Second reopening)
- Closing date: September 6, 2016 (Original); September 3, 2019 (First reopening); September 2, 2022 (Second reopening)
- Replaced: The Magic, the Memories and You (2012); Magical: Disney's New Nighttime Spectacular of Magical Celebrations (2014); Fantasy in the Sky (2015)
- Replaced by: Fantasy in the Sky (2016); Wondrous Journeys (2023)

Ride statistics
- Attraction type: Multimedia and pyrotechnic show
- Designer: Disney Live Entertainment
- Music: Live the Magic & Kiss Goodnight written by Richard M. Sherman (music & lyrics); Various Disney Soundtracks
- Duration: 14:52 (22:44 minutes if including two exit musics (Kiss Goodnight and Live the Magic (ballad version)), cut into 18:35 minutes after removal of Kiss Goodnight in 2019)
- Wheelchair accessible
- Closed captioning available

Disneyland Forever was a nighttime spectacular at Disneyland that premiered alongside the Paint the Night parade and World of Color—Celebrate! on May 21, 2015 as part of the park's 60th anniversary celebration. The show was produced by Disney Live Entertainment, under direction of Steve Davison. Disneyland Forever incorporates fireworks, projection mapping, fire, lasers, and searchlights to depict scenes from Disney films. The show's original run ended on September 5, 2016, upon conclusion of the Diamond Celebration. The shows exit song, "A Kiss Goodnight", would be later be released on CD with a book bearing the song's name.

A second run for Disneyland Forever began on June 7, 2019, marking the first time the show has been presented since the end of the Diamond Celebration. Many enhanced elements that were developed for Mickey's Mix Magic were incorporated into the show. On August 2, 2019, it was confirmed on a livestream of the first performance of the Main Street Electrical Parade that the show would have its final 2019 performance on September 2, 2019. Disneyland Forever closed at Disneyland again on September 2, 2019, to prepare for the return of Halloween Screams for public showing for the first time since opening year on September 6, 2019.

== Technical details ==
Disneyland Forever featured fireworks launched both from backstage areas and from selected locations within the park, as well as the largest projection mapping display ever presented in a Disney park. During the show, video and images are projected on Sleeping Beauty Castle, the buildings along Main Street USA, the Matterhorn, the facade of It's a Small World, and along the Rivers of America (on the water screens from Fantasmic and since 2019, with a water fountains added), using a total of 25 projectors. The projections in each area are different in order to evenly distribute crowds and to encourage people to view the show multiple times from different locations. The show also features fire effects, lasers, searchlights, and other effects, and is approximately fourteen minutes and forty-seven seconds long.

The projection mapping technology installed for Disneyland Forever would remain after the show concluded its initial run; it has since been implemented in Remember... Dreams Come True (albeit without Main Street projections); Disney's Celebrate America; Halloween Screams (and Mickey's Halloween Party in general); Believe... In Holiday Magic for the holiday season; Together Forever, the Pixar fireworks spectacular; Mickey's Mix Magic, the Mickey's 90th anniversary fireworks show; and Wondrous Journeys, the Walt Disney Company's 100th anniversary fireworks show.

== Show summary ==
Two new songs were written for the show: the theme song "Live the Magic" and the exit song "Kiss Goodnight", the latter of which was written by composer Richard M. Sherman and sung by Broadway star Ashley Brown. Other songs co-written by Sherman and his late brother, Robert B. Sherman, including "Step in Time" from Mary Poppins and "Heffalumps and Woozles" from Winnie the Pooh and the Blustery Day are also featured in the show. The rest of the soundtrack includes music, songs, and audio from Disney and Pixar films and archival footage of Walt Disney.

The show features seven themed sections:

- "Opening": A traditional fanfare, complete with 94 high powered searchlights – ultimately forming a diamond over Sleeping Beauty Castle and Main Street USA (as well as other 17 searchlights across Rivers of America as of June 2019) –opens the show (in the alternate version, a low level pyrotechnics was included). As images of orange groves are projected around the viewing areas, the opening narration describes how, 60 years ago, the area where Disneyland currently stands was an orange grove. As the projected oranges grow larger, they burst into pixie dust. Walt Disney's declaration that "as long as there's imagination left in the world, Disneyland will never be complete" ushers in Peter Pan and a live action Tinker Bell. Peter encourages Tinker Bell to sprinkle her pixie dust on the castle as they show the audience "how magical this place can be", leading into "Live the Magic."
- "Clouds": Projections of the rooftops of London accompany the song "Step in Time" from Mary Poppins (Dick Van Dyke recorded new chants as the character Bert for this sequence). Projected kites then segue into floating lanterns as "I See the Light" from Tangled is performed.
- "Enchanted Places": A projection of Winnie the Pooh floats to the top of the castle and dives into a honeycomb to introduce a sequence featuring the songs "Rumbly in My Tumbly" and "Heffalumps and Woozles" from The Many Adventures of Winnie the Pooh.
- "Jungle": The song "Circle of Life", a fireworks "sunrise", and projected animals recreate the opening scene of The Lion King. The scene then transitions to Angkor Wat from The Jungle Book as King Louie performs "I Wanna Be Like You". A "wild jazz number" punctuated by rainstorm effects and waterfalls follow.
- "Sea": Giant inflatable coral structures and projections of underwater scenes accompany Ariel and Sebastian from The Little Mermaid as they perform "Under the Sea". The number ends abruptly as projections of the Tank Gang from "Finding Nemo" encourage a Nemo puppet suspended above the castle to swim through the "Ring of Fire". Projections, smoke and lighting effects on the Matterhorn transform it into Mt. Wannahockaloogie.
- "Snow": The projected smoke and ash from the volcano transition into snow as artificial foam snow begins to fall in the viewing areas. Queen Elsa of Arendelle appears to perform "Let It Go" and projections on the Matterhorn transform it into her snow palace.
- "Finale": The narrator declares that Disneyland will continue to grow and that "the magic, as Walt assured us, will never end." Searchlights, lasers, and projections of Sleeping Beauty Castle, the buildings on Main Street, and the facade of It's a Small World moving and dancing accompany "When You Wish Upon a Star" from Pinocchio and a reprise of "Live the Magic." As the buildings 'disintegrate' and the finale culminates, a projection of Walt hand-in-hand with Mickey Mouse is shown and Peter Pan is heard exclaiming that "(Disneyland) is yours…forever!" A bright ensemble of fireworks punctuate the finale.

== Voices ==
- Ellen Dubin – Disneyland Forever Narrator
- Walt Disney – Himself (archival recording)
- Keith Longo – male vocalist, 'Live the Magic', (Disneyland Forever original recording)
- Sheena Loza – female vocalist, 'Live the Magic', (Disneyland Forever original recording)
- Blayne Weaver – Peter Pan
- Dick Van Dyke – Bert
- Zachary Levi – Flynn Rider/Eugene Fitzherbert
- Mandy Moore – Rapunzel
- Sterling Holloway – Winnie the Pooh (archival recording)
- Paul Winchell – Tigger (archival recording)
- Louis Prima – King Louie (archival recording)
- Jodi Benson – Ariel
- Philip Lawrence – Sebastian
- Brad Garrett – Bloat
- Allison Janney – Peach
- Stephen Root – Bubbles
- Austin Pendleton – Gurgle
- Jerome Ranft – Jacques
- Idina Menzel – Elsa

== Additional information ==
- Although Kiss Goodnight and Live the Magic are exit musics of this show, in the past, this portion can be altered due to special July 4 celebrations in 2015 and 2016 respectively, instead they played a finale of Disney's Celebrate America in a special Independence day tag with fireworks.
  - When Disney opted to run the show for the 2015-2016 holiday season, the preshow/post-show from Believe... In Holiday Magic was used.
- Coinciding with the Grand Opening of Star Wars: Galaxy's Edge for the Summer 2019, the show began a return engagement on June 7, 2019, featuring the many technological elements that are developed for other firework shows, such as Pixar Fest's Together Forever and Mickey's Mix Magic.
- Disneyland Forever's second run in 2019 marks the first time that the Rivers of America gets mist screen changes since its refurbishment in 2016 and in the Fantasmic viewing area, lasers, fountains and searchlights, as well as projection in the area and fog effects (previously were in front of Sleeping Beauty Castle during initial run) were utilized in the show, which is leftover from other firework shows. Pyrotechnics that launched in the area was cut as well.

=== Alternate versions ===
In cases where inclement weather (eg: winds) will affect the night's performance, alternate versions are considered.

- For its debut season, the finale segment was shown with slightly different projections are seen in their respective viewing areas, while the searchlights and lasers still function. This precedent was first used in 2007 for Believe... In Holiday Magic snowfall finale and later in Remember... Dreams Come True.
- For its 2019 return, additional low-level fireworks were introduced the weekend of July 6, 2019. That night's showing saw select new fireworks (including those were previously used in original run) mixed with the traditional shells. A version consisting of all low-level pyrotechnics, including the standard assortments for regular performances, premiered the following evening due to high winds. It is expected to be the B-show for those occasions, following a precedent started in the 2018 holiday season. Neither Tinker Bell nor Nemo make appearances for those reasons and for safety considerations, although Nemo made appearances on August 24, 2019.
- On rare occasions, Mickey's Mix Magic will take its place.

== See also ==
- Celebrate! Tokyo Disneyland and Remember... Dreams Come True
- Disney Dreams!
  - Once Upon a Time
  - Happily Ever After
- Disney Enchantment
- Disney's Celebrate America
- Ignite the Dream: A Nighttime Spectacular of Magic and Light and Disney Illuminations
- Harmonious
