= Believe... There's Magic in the Stars =

Former fireworks show at Disneyland

Disneyland
- Area: Sleeping Beauty Castle; Main Street U.S.A.
- Status: Removed
- Opening date: February 16, 2000
- Closing date: May 30, 2004
- Replaced: Fantasy in the Sky
- Replaced by: Imagine... A Fantasy in the Sky

Ride statistics
- Attraction type: Fireworks spectacular
- Designer: Walt Disney Creative Entertainment
- Music: The Official Album: 2000; The Official Album: 2001
- Wheelchair accessible

Believe... There's Magic In The Stars was a nighttime fireworks show at the Disneyland Resort in Anaheim, California. The show was introduced in early 2000 for the Resort's 45th Anniversary, replacing the long running Fantasy in the Sky fireworks display. At the time, the show was the most complex and lavish ever to be produced by the Disneyland Entertainment team.

On June 1, 2004, Believe... was replaced by Imagine... A Fantasy in the Sky and subsequently on May 1, 2005 by Remember... Dreams Come True for Disneyland's 50th anniversary celebration.

During Believe's entire run at Disneyland, a similarly named fireworks show, Believe... In Holiday Magic, ran during the holiday season, typically from early November to early January.

== Show summary ==
The show, like many other Disneyland fireworks shows, utilizes musical themes from various Disney films to illustrate the message and plot of the show, which is to believe in magic. In the preshow announcement, a child's voice is heard marveling over Disneyland, and the pictures and dreams he can make from the stars above. He then says, "Maybe if I really believe, all my dreams will come true".

The show is broken up into various segments, based on the themes of the films and Disneyland, each of which are introduced with musical theme of the show, "Believe...There's Magic In The Stars", composed by Gregory Smith; most of the song is sung by Sandi Patty.

=== Opening ===
The show begins with a woman's voice gently whispering the word "believe", the show's main theme. The child is heard saying "I wish I never had to leave this magical place", otherwise known as Disneyland. He then wishes on a star for his wish, and the Believe musical theme begins:

- Believe... There's Magic in the Stars (opening)
- "A Whole New World" – Aladdin
- "You'll Be in My Heart" – Tarzan

=== Joy and Laughter ===
- Believe... There's Magic in the Stars (Joy and Laughter)
- "Step in Time" – Mary Poppins
- "Topsy Turvy" – The Hunchback of Notre Dame
- "A Very Merry Unbirthday" – Alice in Wonderland
- "Under the Sea" – The Little Mermaid

=== In The Darkest Night ===
- Believe... There's Magic in the Stars (In The Darkest Night)
- "Two Worlds" – Tarzan
- "Hellfire" – The Hunchback of Notre Dame

=== Believe ===
- Believe... There's Magic in the Stars (Believe)
- "When You Wish Upon a Star" – Pinocchio

=== Fanfare ===
- Believe... There's Magic in the Stars (Fanfare)
- "When You Wish Upon a Star" – Pinocchio

== Soundtrack ==
Walt Disney Records released the show's full audio track on The Official Album: 45 Years of Magic in 2000, and Disneyland Park: The Official Album in 2001.
