= Believe... In Holiday Magic =

Fireworks spectacular at Disneyland

Disneyland
- Area: Sleeping Beauty Castle; Main Street U.S.A. It's A Small World; Rivers of America
- Status: Operating
- Cost: $19,000 per showing
- Opening date: November 3, 2000

Ride statistics
- Designer: Disney Live Entertainment
- Theme: Christmas
- Music: Can You Remember performed by Kellie Coffey
- Duration: 13:27
- Wheelchair accessible

Believe... In Holiday Magic is a holiday fireworks show at the Disneyland Resort in Anaheim, California, launched in 2000. The show runs for much of the Disneyland Resort's holiday season, which typically runs from the second weekend of November to the first weekend of the following January.

== The show ==
=== Pre-shows ===
==== Tick-Tock Tidings ====
Beginning in 2005, one part from the former Holiday Wishes is used every 15 minutes after sunset and before the main show begins at "it's a small world" Holiday. This show was sponsored by Sylvania from 2009–2013 with the show being updated in 2013.

It's also the after show, where its shown 15 minutes after the show ends and before the park closes. For the 2005 and 2015 seasons, this portion was retained even though the main show wasn't performed in those years.

==== Wintertime Enchantment ====
Since 2007 (and altered for 2016), there is mini light show that lights up Sleeping Beauty Castle with snow. The child (presumably Pinocchio) asks his mother (presumably the Blue Fairy) that he wishes for snow to come. The mother then tells him that he must believe in the holidays for it to come true. The soundtrack is a revamped version of Shine from Disney's LuminAria. In 2008, Disneyland introduced an artificial 60 foot tall Christmas Tree in the middle of Town Square near the entrance of the park, in which there are LED lights within the tree itself. These LED lights on the tree and the overhanging garlands (except for 2016, when they were absent due to the Paint the Night parade floats being to tall) used to sync alongside the castle itself until 2017, when Disneyland rolled out new decorations for the tree the following year. In 2015, this show was not present mostly due to the absence of the winter castle and Disney choosing not to tweak any 60th anniversary offerings for the holidays unlike the 50th anniversary ten years prior.

=== Opening ===
The show begins with a young woman (as of the 2007 Christmas season) encouraging everyone to remember and believe in holiday magic: "Does your heart hold the magic of the holidays? Is it filled with warm memories just waiting to be discovered again? Now is the time to open your heart, believe in that magic, and remember those treasured moments. they're still there, deep within you, waiting to touch you once more. So come along as the magic of the seasons leads the way."

As of the 2007 season, the narrator was changed from an old woman's voice to a new younger voice which is believed either to be Kellie Coffey or Rosalyn Landor, the voice of the Blue Fairy. There has been a change in some of the narration, The new voice does not include "Well now is the time to open your heart" and "Oh.. They're still there.."

==== Can You Remember ====
The song "Can You Remember", performed by country singer Kellie Coffey, begins after the woman finishes her speech. The lyrics are a Christmas version of the song "Remember the Magic", the theme song from Walt Disney World's 25th anniversary celebration performed by Brian McKnight.

=== Traditional Holiday Music ===
Following "Can You Remember," the opening strains of the "March of the Toys" from Victor Herbert's operetta Babes in Toyland is heard. This is then followed by instrumental excerpts from various Christmas carols and a Hanukkah song, including: "March of the Wooden Soldiers”, "Toyland, Toyland”, "I Have a Little Dreidel”, "All I Want For Christmas Is My Two Front Teeth, "I'll Be Home for Christmas”, "O Holy Night”, "We Three Kings”, "Joy to the World”, "Silent Night”, "Carol of the Bells”, "Russian Dance (Nutcracker Suite)”, "Arabian Dance (Nutcracker Suite)," and "The Christmas Song."

=== Pyrotechnics Conclusion ===
After the excerpt from "The Christmas Song" is the conclusion to "Can You Remember", now sung by a chorus led by the female vocalist.

A short excerpt from "Have Yourself A Merry Little Christmas" accompanies the final line of "Can You Remember." The woman's voice then says, "Cherish the holidays forever, and always believe", and concludes the pyrotechnics portion of the show.

=== White Christmas and Conclusion ===
The lights then return to normal and "magic snow" falls on guests on Main Street, USA, Small World Mall, and the Fantasmic! viewing area while a rendition of "White Christmas" plays. This rendition is performed by Kellie Coffey. The show concludes with the end of "White Christmas." For the 2005 holiday season, while Disneyland continue performing Remember... Dreams Come True, this song and "magic snowfall" was also included with short introduction by Julie Andrews. Unfortunately, this did not appear in 2015 when Disneyland continued performing Disneyland Forever.

Every year since 2007 (except for 2015), there are 80,000 LEDs on Sleeping Beauty Castle to make it look like it has snow. With this, there are 2 snowfalls, one at the wintertime enchantment lighting ceremony and during the White Christmas segment of Believe... In Holiday Magic. Each snowfall can be seen along the parade route, and the Fantasmic! viewing area. In 2015, Disney chose to hold on to their 60th anniversary diamond castle, so the winter castle was not present that year although there was a wreath on the 60th emblem.

== History ==
In 2000, Disneyland premiered a fireworks show called Believe... There's Magic in the Stars to celebrate its 45th anniversary. The show was so successful in its first couple of months that Disney decided to premiere a holiday version the following holiday season. This version used music from various classic Christmas songs together in order to create a thirteen-minute fireworks spectacular. The holiday version was very popular, especially the finale which culminated in "snow" falling in various areas of the park.

Believe... In Holiday Magic has run every holiday season since 2000, with the exception of the 2005 and 2015 holiday season, when Disney opted to continue performing Remember... Dreams Come True (with a special holiday tag at the end) in observance of Disneyland's 50th anniversary and Disneyland Forever in observance of Disneyland's 60th Diamond Celebration. However, the "Tick-Tock Tidings" pre-show was still retained. For the 70th anniversary in 2025, it was decided to run this show instead of Wondrous Journeys (the 70th show) for the holidays that year.

In returning the show for the 2006 holiday season, Disney has updated it to include some of the pyrotechnic effects presented in Remember.... Most notable is the increased amount of pyrotechnics launched from Sleeping Beauty Castle. On November 16, 2007, new special effects were added to Sleeping Beauty Castle to be seen in Believe... In Holiday Magic. In the 2010 holiday season, castle lighting was changed and searchlights used for Magical and Halloween Screams were added into the show.

For the 2016 holiday season, following the conclusion of Disneyland's 60th Diamond Celebration, projection mapping on Sleeping Beauty Castle was added for certain segments of this show using the same technology that was installed for Disneyland Forever. The searchlights that appear on either side of Sleeping Beauty Castle, which were also installed for Disneyland Forever (initially using Magical searchlights technology) were also implemented in certain portions of this show beginning in the 2016 holiday season.

In 2017, the Main Street USA projections and Rivers of America water screen, also installed for Disneyland Forever, were also implemented in the show.

Prior to 2018 holiday season, on nights when Believe... In Holiday Magic is cancelled due to winds or other reasons a brief introduction of Wintertime Enchantment then snowfall still occurs, so only the finale part is shown.

In 2018 holiday season, a new version of the show with significantly reduced high fireworks and more low level pyrotechnics was shown. This version only shown if there was winds or other reason formerly cause the show to be cancelled. This precedent is later used in 2019 run of Disneyland Forever and Halloween Screams.

Also in 2018, water fountains and searchlights which installed in Rivers of America since Pixar Fest fireworks spectacular Together Forever was utilized in the show.

In 2019 holiday season, the show has returned with some of the elements formerly presented for Mickey's Mix Magic and recently returned Disneyland Forever, which most notable of that is the increased amount of small-sized firework shells on top of the rooftops of It's a Small World Holiday and Mickey & Minnie's Runaway Railway.

The show was cancelled for 2020 in response to the COVID-19 pandemic and the ongoing closure of Disneyland Park amid a regional stay at home order issued by California Governor Gavin Newsom. A year later, the show returned.

== Soundtrack ==
There was an officially released CD for the soundtrack to Believe... In Holiday Magic. The album is called Holiday Magic. The CD also included two other tracks: one for the holiday-themed version of "It's A Small World" entitled "it's a small world" Holiday, and Disney's LuminAria which was a low-level fireworks show on Paradise Bay at Disney California Adventure Park in Anaheim, California.

=== Track listing ===
1. "Believe... In Holiday Magic" Fireworks Spectacular (13:26)

2. "it's a small world" Holiday (15:10)

3. Disney's LuminAria (16:26)

=== Production ===
Album Compiled by: Randy Thornton
Production Assistant: Sarah Harris
Album Art Direction: Jordan Foley

Barcode: 050086006076
ISBN 0-7634-1863-3

== See also ==
- Believe... There's Magic in the Stars
- Disney Dreams of Christmas!
- Disneyland Forever
- Remember... Dreams Come True
- Holiday Wishes
- World of Color: Season of Light
- Wondrous Journeys
- Fantasmic
