= Disney Gifts of Christmas =

Nighttime show at Tokyo Disneyland

Tokyo Disneyland
- Area: Cinderella Castle
- Status: Operating
- Opening date: November 8, 2017

Ride statistics
- Attraction type: Multimedia and pyrotechnic show
- Designer: Steve Davison
- Theme: Christmas
- Music: Gifts of Christmas
- Duration: 15 minutes
- Languages: Japanese; English
- Wheelchair accessible

Disney Gifts of Christmas is a Christmas nighttime spectacular at Tokyo Disneyland, that premiered on November 8, 2017, as part of Christmas Fantasy event.

Similar to Once Upon a Time, Disney Gifts of Christmas uses projection mapping, lasers, fire and searchlights as well as fireworks to celebrates the holiday season with several holiday-themed segments.

== Show summary ==
This nighttime entertainment is themed to gifts that Mickey Mouse and other Disney Characters bring for Christmas. Holiday scenes of the Disney Friends are projected with a colorful, illumination-like effect onto Cinderella Castle while seasonal music plays.

Mickey and friends show up one by one bearing gifts, each with an accompanying scene. These scenes have its own theme that ties back to the holiday season and features Disney and Pixar animated characters.

This is the third Christmas Projection Spectacular that featured Toy Story Nutcracker, followed by Disney Dreams! of Christmas at Disneyland Paris and World of Color: Winter Dreams at Disney California Adventure.

== See also ==
- Believe... In Holiday Magic
