= Magical: Disney's New Nighttime Spectacular of Magical Celebrations =

Former fireworks show at Disneyland

Disneyland
- Area: Sleeping Beauty Castle; Main Street U.S.A.
- Status: Removed
- Cost: $25,000
- Opening date: June 12, 2009
- Closing date: October 2014
- Replaced: Remember... Dreams Come True (summer only)
- Replaced by: Disneyland Forever; Remember... Dreams Come True (2017)

Ride statistics
- Attraction type: Fireworks spectacular
- Designer: Walt Disney Creative Entertainment
- Sponsor: Honda
- Wheelchair accessible

Magical: A Nighttime Spectacular of Magical Celebrations was a 2009–2014 summer fireworks show at Disneyland. Produced by Walt Disney Creative Entertainment, the show featured recorded music and dialogue, fireworks, lower level pyrotechnics, 10k spotlights, and gobo projections via Vari-Lite 3000 Spot fixtures housed in enclosures on Sleeping Beauty Castle and the Matterhorn. The show's main musical theme was an adapted rendition of the main theme from Tokyo Disneyland's It's Magical 10th Anniversary Castle Show and Epcot Center's Splashtacular. Magical was intended as a replacement for Remember... Dreams Come True and as a nighttime entertainment offering for Disneyland's Summer Nightastic promotion, but mainly for the 55th anniversary of Disneyland in 2010.

The music played during the opening and finale originated from It's Magical, Tokyo Disneyland's 10th Anniversary Castle Show and Epcot Center's Splashtacular. The show featured vocal performances by Eden Espinosa, an Anaheim native and a former Disneyland cast performer.

== Show summary ==
Opening

The show begins with a fanfare of the Magical theme while new lighting effects on the castle shimmer and twinkle, and behind the castle 10k spotlights shine up into the night sky.

Magic of Childhood

A comet is launched across the sky and Tinker Bell sweeps past the castle as the chorus sings the show's main theme. The show transitions into a Neverland theme. Eden Espinosa sings a rendition of "The Second Star to the Right", from the Disney film Peter Pan.

Magic of a Wish

As the song "When You Wish Upon a Star" (from Disney's 1940 film Pinocchio) is played, Geppetto is heard making a wish on a star for Pinocchio to become a real boy. The Blue Fairy is heard saying, "Little puppet made of pine, wake. The gift of life is thine". The song "Hi-Diddle-Dee-Dee" plays with an array of multicolored comets shooting up from behind the castle. Excerpts from the songs "Give a Little Whistle" and "I've Got No Strings" are played.

Magic of Imagination

Eden then sings "Chim Chim Cher-ee" from the film Mary Poppins and the voice of Mary Poppins says, "See, children? Everything is practically perfect in every way, or my name isn't Mary Poppins!". "Jolly Holiday" plays, followed by "Step in Time", "Let's Go Fly a Kite", and "Supercalifragilisticexpialidocious".

Magic of a Mother's Love

Eden Espinosa sings "Baby Mine" from Dumbo. Timothy Mouse is heard saying, "You can do it, Dumbo! You can fly! You don't need a magic feather!" An airborne puppet of Dumbo appears above Sleeping Beauty Castle, flapping his big ears and moving his legs. Blue shells are shot in the background. The music softens and Dumbo makes his exit.

Magic of a Kiss

"True Love's Kiss" from Enchanted plays, followed by a short excerpt of "A Dream Is a Wish Your Heart Makes" from Cinderella. Cinderella is heard saying, "I can't believe, not anymore. It's just no use". The Fairy Godmother says, "Come, come now, Cinderella. Dry those tears, and you shall go to the ball!" She says the magic words, "Bibbidi-Bobbidi-Boo!" and a short passage from "So This Is Love" plays, followed by music from Beauty and the Beast and "Once Upon a Dream" from Sleeping Beauty.

Good Fairies Pink/Blue Battle

The three good fairies of Sleeping Beauty are heard reminiscing over the enchantment of the dazzling show. Merryweather and Flora get themselves into a fight over a Pink or Blue finale, which becomes chaos for a short time. Fauna stops the fight and tells them, "It's all beautiful!" and explains that when we believe, any wish can come true. A Mickey Mouse-shaped firework then appears in the sky from Mickey & Minnie's Runaway Railway.

Conclusion

The Magical theme music is heard once more, and "A Dream Is a Wish Your Heart Makes" is reprised. "Gold Chrysanthemum" fireworks and stimulating bulbs (fireworks that explode and show flashes of light on the ends of the trails) are heavily used in the finale. Tinker Bell makes a return, and the show ends as confetti is launched from the rooftops of Main Street.

The music originally played after the fireworks display was "A Dream Is a Wish Your Heart Makes", performed by Kimberley Locke.

== See also ==
The show ran in the summers of 2009–2014, alternating with:

- Halloween Screams for Halloween
- Believe... In Holiday Magic for Christmas
- Remember... Dreams Come True in the spring
- The Magic, Memories, and You! in 2011-2012
  - This show ran as a preshow and post-show to the show, like its original counterpart at Magic Kingdom.
