= Bates Haunt =

Annual Halloween display

Bates Haunt Halloween Show
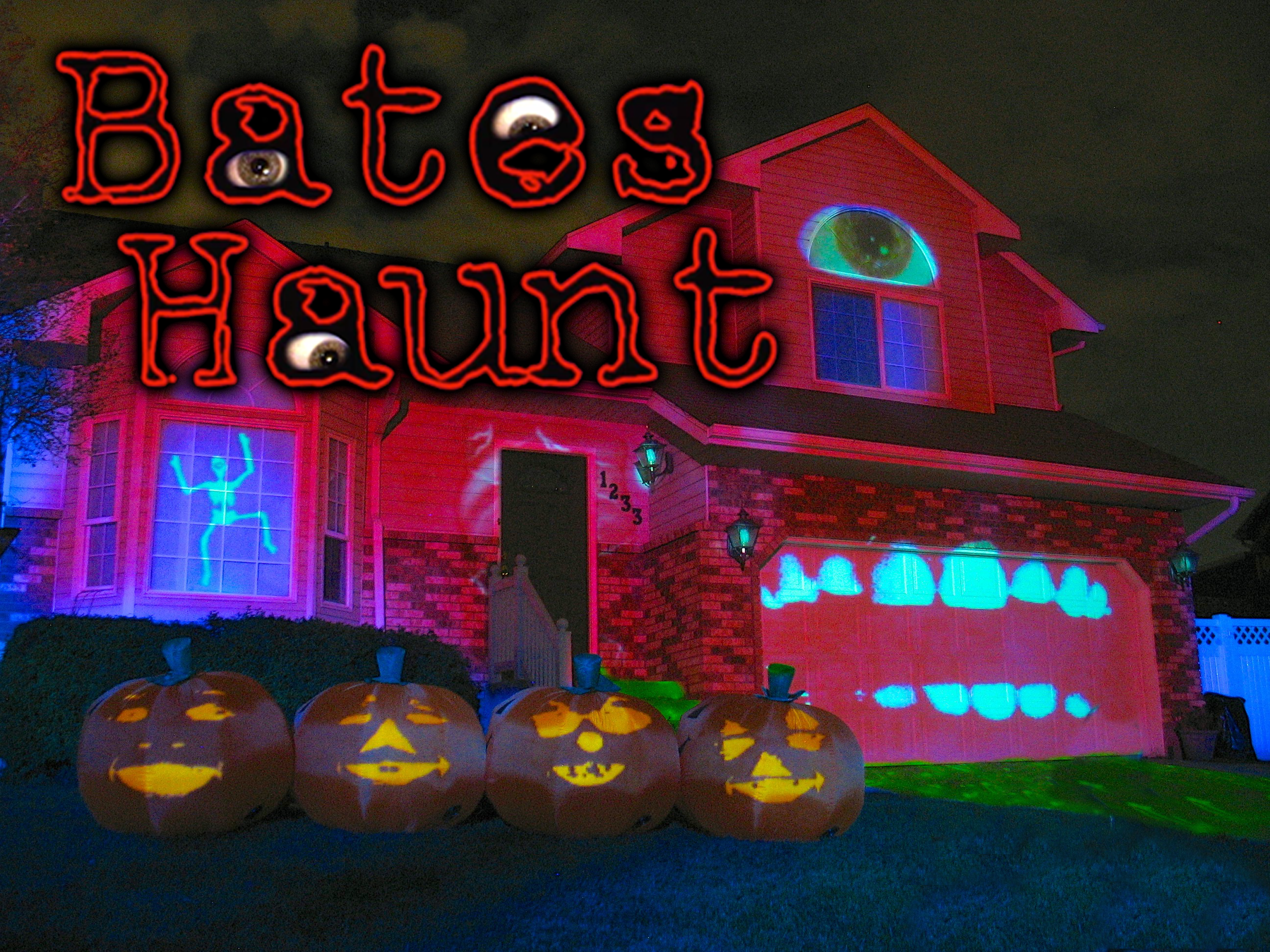
- Bates Haunt in 2015
- Status: active
- Genre: Halloween Show
- Frequency: Annually
- Locations: 1233 Morning Oaks Drive, Taylorsville, UT
- Years active: 24
- Inaugurated: October 31, 2002
- Founder: Dave Bates
- Most recent: 2025
- Website: Official website

Bates Haunt, an annual Halloween display in Taylorsville, Utah, is the first and longest running video projection mapping show on a building. The first show was on October 31, 2002. It continues to hold performances each October.

== History ==
The first performance was on October 31, 2002, using a borrowed 1200 lumen projector projecting from the home across the street. Each year additional elements were added. In 2005 a quartet of leaf bag pumpkins were added singing an original song. The haunt drew the attention of one of the first DIY haunter's conventions HauntX in 2006. There the haunt was awarded two awards: "Best Home Haunt" and "Halloween Enthusiast of the Year". The next year the haunt was featured on Comcast's new digital TV channel Fearnet. Since then the show has continued to grow adding additional original songs and content. It was featured in 2013 on Good Morning America's website in the top 10 Outrageous Halloween Homes Across America as well as various local media outlets.

== Technology ==
Bates Haunt pioneered a technique which used a common drawing program Adobe Photoshop to trace 3D objects using a projector. The resulting image is then brought into a video program and used to precisely align video elements to the projection surface. The show is a single 30 minute video running in a seamless loop.
