= Halloween Screams =

Fireworks spectacular at Disneyland

Halloween Screams: A Villainous Surprise in the Skies
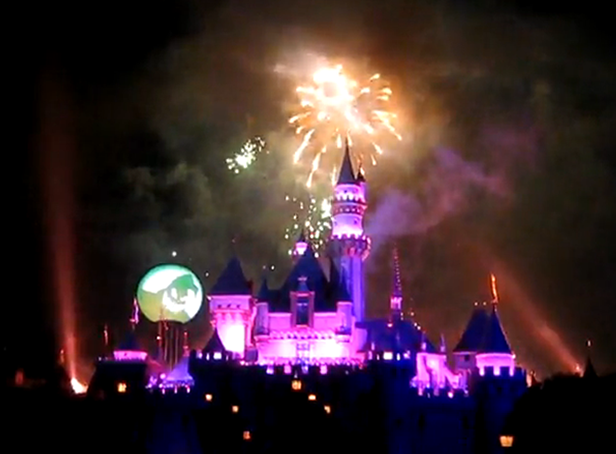

Disneyland
- Status: Operating
- Opening date: September 25, 2009

Ride statistics
- Attraction type: Fireworks spectacular
- Designer: Disney Live Entertainment
- Theme: Halloween
- Wheelchair accessible

Halloween Screams: A Villainous Surprise in the Skies is a Halloween-themed fireworks show that is presented at Disneyland during the seasonal Mickey's Halloween Party event. Based on the similarly themed, former fireworks show HalloWishes at Magic Kingdom, Halloween Screams is hosted by Jack Skellington and features appearances from Disney Villains and music from Disney animated features.

== History ==
The show was produced by Disney Live Entertainment, and its development was supervised by Steven Davison and designer Eric Tucker. The display began in 2009, during Disneyland's Halloween Time Celebration. The show is similar to that of Walt Disney World Resort's former HalloWishes, and uses many portions of that show's audio. The Anaheim version differs in that it is hosted by Jack Skellington from Tim Burton's The Nightmare Before Christmas. The show ran from September 25 to November 1, 2009 (the duration of Halloween Time at the Disneyland Resort) and since 2010, it ran exclusively for Mickey's Halloween Party until 2018. Beginning that year, it would start presenting on non-party nights again. In 2019, the show was modified to run like Mickey's Mix Magic: show fireworks during Mickey's Halloween Party nights and only show projections on other nights.

On occasions of high winds or bad weather which forces to cancel the fireworks part of the show, a B-mode of the show is presented which consists of only low level pyrotechnics and small-sized firework shells. In September 2022, Disneyland announced that an updated version of Halloween fireworks shows would come. This update introduced a new projection of Jack Skellington on the sphere-shaped balloon.

In 2023, due to the Fantasmic! Maleficent dragon fire that occurred in April of that year, the flame effects were cut and replaced by regular low-level fireworks.

== Show summary ==
The show opens with the overture from Tim Burton's The Nightmare Before Christmas, an instrumental medley of songs from the film including "What's This?" and "Making Christmas". Zero (Jack Skellington's dog from the film) flies above Sleeping Beauty Castle. He is shortly joined by Jack, or rather his head (in the form of projection onto a sphere shaped balloon), located on the upper left of the castle. These projections can also be viewed along the Rivers of America, which recycle the mist screens used in Fantasmic!. There are only searchlights and projection mapping used in the show's introduction. No actual pyrotechnics are used for the first two minutes.

Jack and Zero fade into the night and the first pyrotechnics are launched when "Grim Grinning Ghosts", from the Disneyland attraction the Haunted Mansion, begins to play. Projections of rising ghosts make an appearance on the castle. The music from "Grim Grinning Ghosts" changes to an upbeat pop tempo. Then the mood is set with "This is Halloween" from The Nightmare Before Christmas.

Then Disney's most infamous villains begin to arrive, beginning with Ursula (from The Little Mermaid). The guests are serenaded with a montage of Disney's most spookiest music. Later, Oogie Boogie (from The Nightmare Before Christmas) soon follows, and arriving last is Maleficent (from Sleeping Beauty), showing guests how Halloween should really be celebrated. The party ends with Jack and Zero initiating the "scream-along" grand finale.

== Soundtrack ==
- "Overture" (from The Nightmare Before Christmas) (Danny Elfman)
- "Grim Grinning Ghosts" (from Haunted Mansion) (Buddy Baker / X Atencio)
- "This is Halloween" (from The Nightmare Before Christmas) (Elfman)
- Ursula's Spellbound Medley:
  - "Poor Unfortunate Souls" (from The Little Mermaid) (Alan Menken / Howard Ashman)
  - "Cruella de Vil" (from One Hundred and One Dalmatians and its 1996 live-action remake) (Mel Leven)
  - "Never Smile at a Crocodile" (from Peter Pan) (Frank Churchill / Jack Lawrence)
  - "The Elegant Captain Hook" (from Peter Pan) (Sammy Cahn)
  - "The Skeleton Dance" (from the Silly Symphonies short, The Skeleton Dance) (Edvard Grieg, adapted by Carl Stalling)
  - "Trust In Me" (from The Jungle Book) (The Sherman Brothers) mixed in with "AEIOU" (from Alice in Wonderland) (Oliver Wallace / Ted Sears)
  - "Heffalumps and Woozles" (from Winnie the Pooh and the Blustery Day) (The Sherman Brothers)
  - "Pink Elephants on Parade" (from Dumbo) (Wallace / Ned Washington)
  - "Who's Afraid of the Big, Bad Wolf?" (from The Three Little Pigs) (Churchill)
- Oogie Boogie's Underground Casino Lair:
  - "Oogie Boogie's Song" (from The Nightmare Before Christmas) (Elfman)
- Maleficent's Visit:
  - "Night on Bald Mountain" (from Fantasia; voice over by Maleficent) (Modest Mussorgsky)^{×}
  - "Hellfire" (from The Hunchback of Notre Dame) (Menken)^{×}
- Reprise of "This is Halloween" and "Grim Grinning Ghosts" in a "Scream-Along" medley finale
- "I Put a Spell on You" (lyrics from Hocus Pocus) (written by Screamin' Jay Hawkins; plays as the exit music for the show)

^{×} — Instrumental version is played.

== Voice cast ==
- Chris Sarandon as Jack Skellington
- Pat Carroll as Ursula the Sea Witch
- Ken Page as Oogie Boogie
- Susanne Blakeslee as Maleficent

== Trivia ==
The projections used on the sphere to the upper left of the castle were later used as projections on the Fantasmic! mist screens at the Rivers of America during the show. The decision to have video playback during the fireworks was made in October 2009. In 2015, the projectors installed for Disneyland Forever at the castle were also utilized. Not only are they an addition to the show, they are also used to project various images during the party hours. Projections used on the sphere were modified as well.

In 2018, the last year of the show exclusive to Mickey's Halloween Party, the projections were expanded to across the park with Main Street U.S.A. now using the projection mapping and searchlights to accommodate the show's viewing.

The show was formerly only performed during Mickey's Halloween Party, for party guests only. On occasions where the show is cancelled during the Halloween Party, the show is presented the next night, even if this is not a party night, as the fireworks cannot be taken out from the launch tubes to be saved for another night.

The 2019 showing of the show was the first public showing in decades since the opening year in 2009 after Halloween Party moved to Disney California Adventure. The show saw many changes:

- It's a Small World had updated many scenes of the show as it was the only location to not have projections updated until 2019.
  - It's a Small World already had projections since it debut, but wasn't updated in 2015 or 2018.
- In Rivers of America, the show was enhanced and utilized with fountains, lasers, new projections in the area, and searchlights, which were also used for many firework shows such as Together Forever (first firework show to have this technology), Believe... In Holiday Magic, Mickey's Mix Magic, and 2019 version of Disneyland Forever.
- There were more fireworks than in the previous year of showing for select nights (mainly Friday to Sunday) and more of lasers (albeit without fireworks) which were used in other weeknights.

== See also ==
- HalloWishes
- Disney's Nightmare in the Sky
