= Together Forever (Disney) =

Former fireworks show at Disneyland

Together Forever – A Pixar Nighttime Spectacular
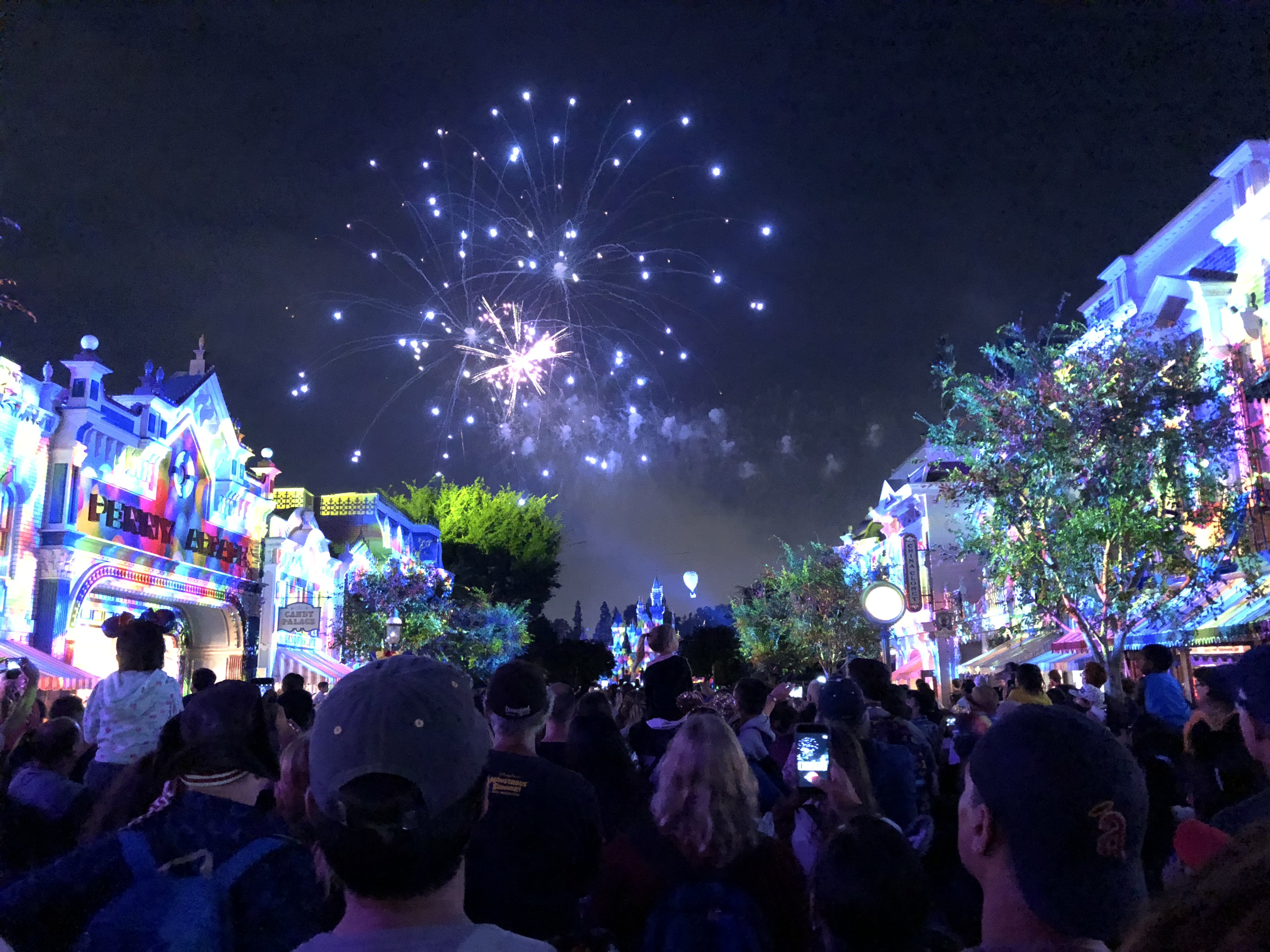
- Up Segment from Together Forever

Disneyland
- Area: Main Street, U.S.A. Sleeping Beauty Castle; It's A Small World; Rivers of America
- Status: Removed
- Soft opening date: April 10, 2018 (original); April 19, 2024 (updated)
- Opening date: April 13, 2018 (original); April 26, 2024 (updated)
- Closing date: September 3, 2018 (original); August 22, 2024 (updated)
- Replaced: Remember... Dreams Come True (2018; for Pixar Fest only); Wondrous Journeys (2024)
- Replaced by: Remember... Dreams Come True (2018); Wondrous Journeys (2025)

Ride statistics
- Attraction type: Fireworks spectacular and multimedia show
- Designer: Disney Live Entertainment
- Theme: Pixar
- Wheelchair accessible
- Assistive listening available

Together Forever – A Pixar Nighttime Spectacular was a multimedia night-time show at Disneyland. This show premiered alongside the returning Paint the Night parade on April 13, 2018, as part of the Pixar Fest celebration. The show used fireworks, projection mapping, pyrotechnics, lasers and searchlights to retell stories from various Pixar movies.

Similar in scale to Disneyland Forever, the show had several viewing locations. Projection mapping was used on Sleeping Beauty Castle, It's a Small World and the buildings of Main Street, USA. The show was also projected onto the water screens on the Rivers of America (used during Fantasmic).

This was the first fireworks show to use Disneyland Forever's storyline, which uses Disney Dreams storyline. A similar storyline was also used for the Once Upon a Time fireworks show.

On December 23, 2023, Disneyland announced that the show would return on April 26, 2024 and would take place until August 4, 2024, prior to the start of the Halloween season. After Pixar Fest concluded on August 4, the show continued its performance until August 22, 2024, a day before Halloween Screams returns.

Since 2024, this show utilized spotlights on top of the show building for It's a Small World, which were installed in 2023.

== Show summary ==
The show begins with the Luxo Ball from Luxo Jr. rolling towards the audience as the projections begin and the regular BGM loop fades. This is followed by the appearance of Buzz Lightyear from Toy Story flying over the Sleeping Beauty Castle as fireworks and searchlights illuminate the sky.

Next, Dug from Up gets distracted by a squirrel as characters from Monsters, Inc. and Monsters University take over the display. A projected ocean sets the scene for Finding Nemo as Marlin and Dory have a dispute. Ember and Wade from Elemental appear to get to know each other. Subsequently, Joy and Sadness from Inside Out traverse through Riley's mind, to discover Bing Bong. Russell from Up then begins a rehearsed speech to Carl Fredricksen, who shuts a door to end the section.

The consecutive section commences with WALL-E and Eve from WALL-E projected onto landmarks throughout the park as they soar across outer space to the film's score, accompanied by Joe Gardner in his soul form and soul number 22 from Soul and Luca Paguro and Alberto Scorfano from Luca. Then, Meilin Lee from Turning Red assembles her besties Miriam, Priya, and Abby as Meilin transforms into a red panda. This is followed by Luca and Alberto’s transformation as sea monsters. From there, Miguel from Coco plays his guitar and breaks into song as inflatable skeletons appear above the buildings on Main Street, USA.

"Life is a Highway" from Cars plays as several characters from the franchise make their appearances. This was replaced by the magic of Ian Lightfoot and his brother Barley from Onward as they work together to take down the dragon of New Mushroomton High School. Soon, The Incredibles take over the scene in a battle to defeat the Omnidroid. Fire shoots around Sleeping Beauty Castle synchronized with the incinerator from Toy Story 3 until the toys are ultimately saved by "The Claw".

After projecting clips from Up, Carl Fredrickson's house flies above Sleeping Beauty Castle. Mike and Sulley then performs “If I Didn't Have You." Later, Meilin’s friends perform 4Town’s “Nobody Like U." Finally, a montage of several infamous friendships from various Pixar films are projected to the song "You've Got a Friend in Me." Buzz Lightyear and Woody appear once again, proclaiming that their friendship is "to infinity and beyond" as the show concludes.

After the show, footage of Barbie is shown from the bloopers scenes of Toy Story 2, thanking the audience for coming, as the song "We Belong Together" plays. In 2024, the song was replaced by “Nobody Like U” as various Pixar characters appear on the Pixar-colored buildings (except for the Rivers of America).

On July 4, 2018, this has been replaced with the ending of Disney's Celebrate America, with Tour Guide Barbie still giving her monologue at the end (as a voiceover within the regular BGM, no projections whatsoever). On July 3rd and 4th, 2024, the show was entirely put on hiatus for the full show of Celebrate instead.

== See also ==
- Wondrous Journeys
