= Wondrous Journeys =

Fireworks show at Disneyland

Disneyland
- Area: Main Street, U.S.A. Sleeping Beauty Castle; It's A Small World; Rivers of America
- Status: Removed
- Soft opening date: January 26, 2023(Disney100); May 13, 2025 (70th Anniversary)
- Opening date: January 27, 2023(Disney100); March 22, 2024 (First Reopening); May 16, 2025 (70th Anniversary)
- Closing date: August 31, 2023(Disney100); April 14, 2024 (First Reopening); August 20, 2026 (70th Anniversary)
- Replaced: Disneyland Forever (2022); Together Forever – A Pixar Nighttime Spectacular (2024) (Pixar Fest only)
- Replaced by: Together Forever – A Pixar Nighttime Spectacular (2024) (Pixar Fest only); Remember... Dreams Come True (2027)

Ride statistics
- Attraction type: Multimedia and pyrotechnic show
- Designer: Disney Live Entertainment; Walt Disney Animation Studios
- Music: It's Wondrous; Various Disney Soundtracks
- Duration: 13:50 minutes
- Wheelchair accessible

Wondrous Journeys was a projection mapping and fireworks show at Disneyland that debuted on January 27, 2023. It initially premiered alongside World of Color: One as part of the Disney 100 Years of Wonder celebration commemorating The Walt Disney Company's centennial, and was subsequently incorporated into Disneyland's 70th anniversary celebration. The show contains a large assortment of songs and characters from the entirety of the Walt Disney Animation Studios feature film canon.

== History ==
The show was announced on September 11, 2022, during the D23 Expo. It was developed by Disney Live Entertainment and Walt Disney Animation Studios as part of a collaboration.

=== Show runs ===
The show's original run started on January 27, 2023 and ended on August 31, 2023. On December 21, 2023, Disneyland announced that the show will return on March 22, 2024, until April 14, 2024. On December 5, 2024, it was announced that the show will return again on May 16, 2025 until August 9, 2026, as part of Disneyland Resort's 70th anniversary celebration.

However, on June 2, 2026, it was announced that the fireworks show has been extended until August 20, 2026.

== Show summary ==
=== Overview ===
Wondrous Journeys is a multimedia show that was created to celebrate 100 years of Walt Disney Animation Studios and the entire company as a whole. It features a projected montage of all 61 films released by the studio during the 100 years of the studios existence, paying tribute to Disney as well as moments featuring characters from films, such as Snow White and the Seven Dwarfs, The Little Mermaid, The Princess and the Frog, Frozen, Encanto, Wish, and many other films.

The show has four viewing areas within the park: Main Street, U.S.A., Sleeping Beauty Castle, It's A Small World, and Rivers of America. The projection mapping for the show was made by Medici Media (formerly Mousetrappe).

=== Opening ===
The list below shows complete scenes during the show. Due to differences in projection size, certain scenes are absent from the castle side and the Fantasmic! stage side.

Introduction

At the start of the show, an introduction welcomes guests with the following words:

For over a hundred years, Walt Disney Animation Studios has invited audiences to believe in things never thought possible. And so tonight, we once again invite you to wish upon stars, to step into the unknown, and to join us on this: our wondrous journey.

Shortly afterwards, the music begins with Plio's opening narration from Dinosaur before the show theme It's Wondrous begins:

Some things start out big, and some things start out small, but sometimes the smallest thing can make the biggest changes of all.

During the introduction, the projection on the Fantasmic! stage shows lights with the same colors as Flora, Fauna, and Merryweather, while other buildings just show blue searchlight-like lights.

After that, the original theme song of the show It's Wondrous plays, and features the line drawing and footage from the following shorts and films:

- Steamboat Willie (Mickey's footage origin) / Orphan's Benefit (Donald's footage origin) / The Whoopee Party (Goofy's footage origin)
- Line drawing from Snow White and the Seven Dwarfs with following support line drawing contents:
  - Pinocchio / Lady and the Tramp
  - Encanto / The Princess and the Frog
  - Tarzan / Peter Pan
- Line drawing and concept art from Bambi
- The Sorcerer's Apprentice from Fantasia
- Tarzan / The Many Adventures of Winnie the Pooh / Pocahontas / The Firebird Suite from Fantasia 2000 / The Fox and the Hound
- Concept arts and animation from The Sorcerer's Apprentice / Aladdin / The Little Mermaid
- Concept arts and animation from Snow White and the Seven Dwarfs / Frozen / Cinderella

=== Act 1 ===
After the introduction that contains the original theme song of the show, a transition occurs featuring the Philadelphia Orchestra's silhouette in Fantasia 2000. In this part, the instrumental version of When You Wish Upon a Star plays, then the first lyric of I'm Wishing sung by Snow White combined with the melody from I Wonder from Sleeping Beauty. After that, the reprise of When You Wish Upon A Star plays for the castle side, for it features a flyover of Blue Fairy that is accompanied by shooting stars of fireworks, while for the other buildings, it shows the films instead below:

- Tangled
- Lilo & Stitch
- The Princess and the Frog
- Aladdin
- Chicken Little
- Peter Pan
- Cinderella
- Wish

Songs of Hope and Yearning

This is a segment that featuring the concept art and the characters sung from three films from Disney Renaissance era as well as Moana from the Disney Revival era.

- Go the Distance (Hercules)
- Belle (Beauty and the Beast)
- How Far I'll Go (Moana)
- Out There (The Hunchback of Notre Dame)

In the Out There segment, all characters from four films sing together at the finale.

=== Act 2 ===
This act begins with Tiana's father James telling her about her dream and the hard work. "Now you remember, that old star can only take you part of the way. You got to help it out with some hard work of your own." Upon the conclusion of the quote, the song Almost There plays with initially slowing-mode to depict the scenes of Tiana from The Princess and The Frog, Pocahontas from Pocahontas, as well as Simba and Mufasa from The Lion King. With the song becoming more upbeat, the scenes transition from The Lion King into featuring characters from many films from different locations:

- Alice in Wonderland
- The Black Cauldron
- Lilo & Stitch
- Oliver & Company
- The Aristocats
- Brother Bear

It then switches into a footage featuring The Hunchback of Notre Dame, and therefore it transitions into a scene where Peter Pan is flying with his friends combined with the a snippet of You Can Fly taking the journey to depict the footage of ships from the following films:

- Lilo & Stitch
- Meet the Robinsons
- The Adventures of Ichabod and Mr. Toad
- The Great Mouse Detective
- Moana
- Treasure Planet
- Atlantis: The Lost Empire (Main Street only)
- Whales from Pines of Rome from Fantasia 2000

For another part, For the First Time in Forever plays, and it features some scenes from the following films in different buildings:

- Raya and the Last Dragon
- Encanto
- Mexico from The Three Caballeros
- The Pastoral Symphony from Fantasia
- Bumble from Melody Time
- Robin Hood
- Pedro from Saludos Amigos
- Big Hero 6
- Tangled
- Tarzan
- Aladdin
- Frozen II
- The Rescuers Down Under
- The Rescuers
- The Sword in the Stone
- Dumbo
- The Sorcerer's Apprentice from Fantasia

=== Act 3 ===
This act begins with a transition featuring Treasure Planet and Long John Silver's narration – "You got the makings of greatness in you, but you got to take the helm and chart your own course. Stick to it, no matter the squalls!" It then transitions to a scene of the Golden Bridge from Big Hero 6, the castle side features a flyover of Baymax, while other buildings and Rivers of America use projection animation of Baymax and Hiro Hamada. After that, the song Immortals plays featuring dialogues from Disney characters from Atlantis: The Lost Empire, Raya and the Last Dragon, and Big Hero 6. From these scenes, it combines with I'll Make a Man Out of You from Mulan and features movie's characters from the different buildings. In the climax, Casa Madrigal from Encanto collapses, with all related buildings except the tavern at the Fantasmic! stage area collapsing in the same way while Baymax breaks a hole in Krei's teleportation portal space.

- Transition featuring Treasure Planet
- Immortals (Big Hero 6)
  - During the scene of The Golden Bridge from Big Hero 6, the castle side features a flyover of Baymax, while other buildings use projection animation of Baymax and Hiro instead.
  - Opening speech includes:
    - Milo from Atlantis: The Lost Empire
    - Sergeant Calhoun from Wreck-It Ralph
    - Raya from Raya and the Last Dragon
  - Big Hero 6 / Aladdin / Encanto / Wreck-It Ralph
  - Mulan / Hercules / Tangled / Raya and the Last Dragon
- Immortals (Big Hero 6) / I'll Make a Man Out of You (Mulan)
  - Mulan/Hercules / Moana
  - Raya and the Last Dragon / Robin Hood / Aladdin
  - The Rescuers Down Under / Treasure Planet (Main Street projection) or Zootopia (elsewhere) / Frozen II
  - Beauty and the Beast
  - The Old Mill from Silly Symphony
- Casa Madrigal's collapse from Encanto, with all related buildings except the tavern at the Fantasmic! stage (Sleeping Beauty Castle, all shop buildings at Main Street, U.S.A. and the It's a Small World building) collapsing in the same way while Baymax breaks a hole in Krei's teleportation portal space.
- Immortals (Big Hero 6, instrumental) / Mufasa Dies (The Lion King)
  - Zootopia
  - Frozen II
  - Cinderella
  - Mulan
  - The Lion King
  - Bambi
  - Pocahontas
  - Tarzan
  - Moana
- I Am Moana (Song of the Ancestors) (Moana)
- Dos Oruguitas (Encanto, instrumental)
  - Mulan
  - Frozen II
- Dos Oruguitas (Encanto, refrain part); all related buildings transform into Casa Madrigal with the following contents appearing as Casa Madrigal's glowing door style:
  - The Madrigal family from Encanto
  - Simba, Nala, Timon, and Pumbaa from The Lion King
  - Aladdin, Jasmine, Genie, and The Sultan from Aladdin
  - Belle and Beast from Beauty and the Beast
  - Tiana, Naveen and Louis from The Princess and the Frog
  - Mowgli, Baloo, Bagheera, King Louie, and Rama from The Jungle Book
  - Aurora, Phillip, Flora, Fauna, and Merryweather from Sleeping Beauty
  - Moana and Maui from Moana
  - Anna, Elsa, Sven, Kristoff, and Olaf from Frozen
  - Ariel and King Triton from The Little Mermaid
  - Kuzco and Pacha from The Emperor's New Groove
  - Mickey Mouse, Minnie Mouse, Donald Duck, Goofy, and Pluto

=== Finale ===
- It's Wondrous (reprise)
  - The Little Mermaid
  - Tangled / Encanto / The Sword in the Stone
  - Aladdin / Zootopia / The Little Mermaid
  - Dumbo / Tarzan / Raya and the Last Dragon
  - Frozen / Beauty and the Beast / The Black Cauldron
  - The Sorcerer's Apprentice from Fantasia / Pocahontas / Cinderella
  - Treasure Planet / Atlantis: The Lost Empire / Symphony No. 5 from Fantasia 2000
  - Peter Pan / The Rescuers Down Under / Bambi
  - Moana / The Lion King / Brother Bear
- The show concludes with the following dialogue (with "When You Wish Upon A Star" as background music):
  - Narrator: "And so we come to the end of this chapter."
  - Winnie the Pooh: "Oh no, please! Can't we go back to page one and do it all over again?"
  - Narrator: "But Pooh, it is just another turn of the page, and I for one think what comes next will be wondrous..."
- Conclusion (final tones of It's Wondrous)
  - The Firebird Suite from Fantasia 2000
  - Big Hero 6 / Home on the Range / One Hundred and One Dalmatians / Winnie the Pooh / Ralph Breaks the Internet
  - The Princess and the Frog / The Jungle Book / The Emperor's New Groove / Meet the Robinsons / Pinocchio
  - Bolt / Snow White and the Seven Dwarfs / Hercules / Strange World / Dinosaur
- It's Wondrous (Lawrence Version) (Exit Music)

== Soundtrack ==
Wondrous Journeys features a soundtrack comprising 18 songs. "It's Wondrous" – an original song sung by Devon Garcia and Rudi – is used as the theme song for the show. After the show, a different rendition of "It's Wondrous" by Lawrence plays. The other 17 songs are from various Walt Disney Animation Studios films. The soundtrack for the show was composed by Christopher Lennertz.

Songs in Wondrous Journeys
Song	Film/Artist
It's Wondrous	Devon Garcia and Rudi
I'm Wishing	Snow White and the Seven Dwarfs
I Wonder	Sleeping Beauty
When You Wish Upon a Star	Pinocchio
Belle (Reprise)	Beauty and the Beast
Go the Distance	Hercules
How Far I'll Go	Moana
Out There	The Hunchback of Notre Dame
Almost There	The Princess and the Frog
You Can Fly!	Peter Pan
For the First Time in Forever	Frozen
Immortals	Big Hero 6
I'll Make a Man Out of You	Mulan
Mufasa Dies	The Lion King
I Am Moana (Song of the Ancestors)	Moana
Dos Oruguitas	Encanto

== See also ==
- Disneyland Forever
- Remember... Dreams Come True
- Together Forever – A Pixar Nighttime Spectacular
- Disney Enchantment
- Happily Ever After
