= Disney Live Entertainment =

American theatrical entertainment company

- Formerly: Walt Disney Entertainment Walt Disney Parks and Resorts Creative Entertainment Disney Parks Live Entertainment (2018-2021)
- Type: Division
- Founded: 2000; 26 years ago
- Headquarters: Glendale, California & Kissimmee, FL, United States
- Key people: David Lightbody (SVP - Disney Live Entertainment) Steve Davison (Executive Parades and Spectaculars)
- Products: Theatrical/technical live entertainment productions
- Owner: The Walt Disney Company
- Parent: Walt Disney Imagineering
- Divisions: Disney Live Entertainment - Disneyland Resort Disney Live Entertainment - Walt Disney World Disney Live Entertainment - International Disney Live Entertainment - Disney Signature Experiences
- Subsidiaries: The Muppets Studio
- Website: sites.disney.com/waltdisneyimagineering/live-entertainment/

Disney Live Entertainment is the theatrical live entertainment production division of Walt Disney Imagineering, the design and development arm of Disney Experiences, a division and business segment of The Walt Disney Company.

== History ==
=== Disney Entertainment ===
Formerly founded as Walt Disney Entertainment as a wing of the Walt Disney Company, it produced all shows and parades for Disney worldwide, including everything from the Disney-created Super Bowl Half-time shows to theme parks. The division was altered on January 31, 2001, at the retirement of Executive Vice President, Ron Logan, who was the head of the division.

=== Disney Creative Entertainment ===
Disney Creative Entertainment was founded in 2000 with the arrival of Executive Vice President Anne Hamburger.

== Works ==
Some of the company's most notable works since being officially formed in 2000 include:

=== Disneyland Resort ===
- Disneyland
  - Fantasmic!
  - Light Magic
  - Believe... There's Magic in the Stars
    - Believe... In Holiday Magic
  - Remember... Dreams Come True
  - Walt Disney's Parade of Dreams
  - Disney's Celebrate America
  - Magical: Disney's New Nighttime Spectacular of Magical Celebrations
  - Paint the Night Parade
  - Disneyland Forever
  - Together Forever
  - Wondrous Journeys
- Disney California Adventure
  - Pixar's Block Party Bash
  - Pixar Play Parade
  - World of Color
  - Aladdin: A Musical Spectacular
  - Playhouse Disney – Live on Stage (2003–2011)
  - Disney Junior – Live on Stage! (2011–2017)
    - Disney Junior Dance Party! (2017–2025)
  - Mickey Mouse Clubhouse Live! (May 16 – August 14, 2025, TBA 2026)
  - Frozen – Live at the Hyperion
  - Rogers: The Musical

=== Walt Disney World Resort ===
- Magic Kingdom
  - SpectroMagic
  - The Legend of the Lion King
  - Wishes: A Magical Gathering of Disney Dreams
  - Disney's Celebrate America
  - Celebrate the Magic
  - Once Upon a Time
  - Happily Ever After
  - Disney Enchantment
  - Disney Starlight: Dream the Night Away
- Epcot
  - Laserphonic Fantasy
  - IllumiNations
    - Reflections of Earth
  - Epcot Forever
  - Harmonious
  - Luminous: The Symphony of Us
- Disney's Hollywood Studios
  - Dick Tracy
  - Beauty and the Beast Live on Stage!
  - Bear in the Big Blue House Live! (1999–2001)
  - The American Idol Experience
  - Star Wars: A Galactic Spectacular
  - The Little Mermaid – A Musical Adventure
- Disney's Animal Kingdom
  - Festival of the Lion King
  - Finding Nemo – The Musical
  - The Jungle Book: Alive with Magic
  - Rivers of Light

=== Tokyo Disney Resort ===
- Tokyo Disneyland
  - Once Upon A Time
  - Disney Gifts of Christmas
  - Celebrate! Tokyo Disneyland
- Tokyo DisneySea
  - BraviSEAmo!
  - Fantasmic!

=== Disneyland Paris ===
- Disneyland Park (Paris)
  - Wishes: A Magical Gathering of Disney Dreams
  - Disney Dreams!
  - Disney Illuminations
  - Disney Stars on Parade
- Disney Adventure World
  - Disney Junior: Live On Stage!
- Disney Village

=== Hong Kong Disneyland Resort ===
- Hong Kong Disneyland
  - Festival of the Lion King
  - Disney in the Stars
  - Paint the Night

=== Shanghai Disney Resort ===
- Shanghai Disneyland
  - Ignite the Dream: A Nighttime Spectacular of Magic and Light

=== Disney Cruise Line ===
- Twice Charmed – Disney Magic
- Tangled: The Musical – Disney Magic
- Toy Story: The Musical – Disney Wonder
- Frozen: A Musical Spectacular – Disney Wonder and Disney Fantasy
- The Golden Mickeys – Disney Wonder and Disney Dream
- Disney's Believe – Disney Fantasy and Disney Dream
- Villains Tonight! – Disney Magic and Disney Dream
- Beauty and the Beast: A Musical Spectacular – Disney Treasure

=== Other venues ===
- 2016 Honda Celebration of Light – Vancouver Fireworks
- 2022 Special Olympics USA Games – Opening Ceremony
