= Projection mapping =

Using software to guide the placement of light displays on objects

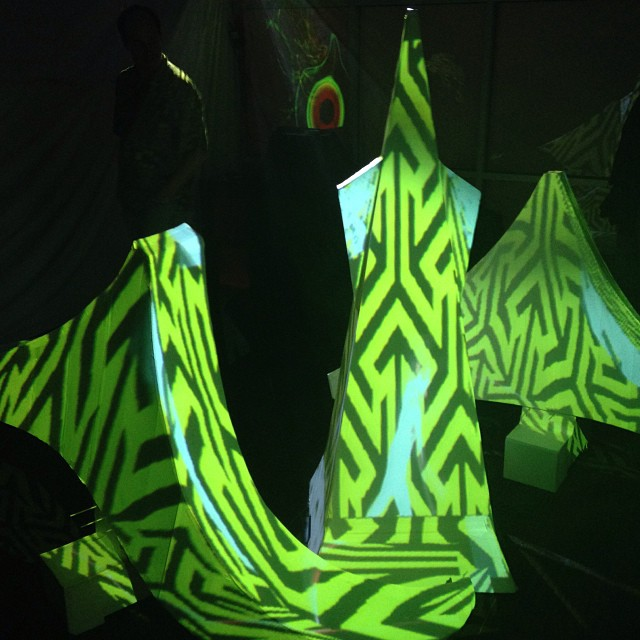
Projection mapping of a pattern onto curved surfaces

Projection mapping, similar to video mapping and spatial augmented reality, is a projection technique used to turn objects, often irregularly shaped, into display surfaces for video projection. The objects may be complex industrial landscapes, such as buildings, small indoor objects, or theatrical stages. Using specialized software, a two- or three-dimensional object is spatially mapped on the virtual program which mimics the real environment it is to be projected on. The software can then interact with a projector to fit any desired image onto the surface of that object. The technique is used by artists and advertisers who can add extra dimensions, optical illusions, and notions of movement onto previously static objects. The video is commonly combined with or triggered by audio to create an audiovisual narrative. In recent years the technique has also been widely used in the context of cultural heritage as an edutainment tool.

== History ==
Although the term "projection mapping" is relatively new, the technique dates back to the mid-20th century. Josef Svoboda, a Czech scenographer, debuted Laterna Magika at Expo 58, the 1958 Brussels World Fair. Laterna Magika was a live performance that featured singers, dancers, and musicians performing against a backdrop of projected film footage. Günther Schneider-Siemssen was a German set designer, who coined the phrase, "painting with light. He used Pani projectors to create large-scale projections for operas. In the late 1960s, audiences referred to projection mapping as, "the Madame Leota effect," based on the use of the technique in Disney's Haunted Mansion. Disneyland debuted a projection effect in 1969, when they opened their Haunted Mansion attraction, which featured singing three-dimensional busts. The singers' faces were filmed on 16mm film and projected onto busts of their faces to make the busts appear animated. Another early example of projection mapping was in the 1967 TV movie Magical Mystery Tour during the "Blue Jay Way" scene, where images were projected onto George Harrison, including a cat's face and a headless male torso with the words "Magical Mystical Boy" written on its chest.

The next record of projection mapping is from 1980, when installation artist Michael Naimark filmed people interacting with objects in a living room and then projected it in the room, creating illusions as if the people interacting with the objects were really there.

In 1984 the Stephen Sondheim original Broadway production of Sunday in the Park With George, written and directed by James Lapine, was the first known use of projection mapping in a Broadway musical or play. It was used at the end of Act II, in the Chromolume #7 special effects sequence designed by Bran Ferren to project geometrically-correct moving cinematic images onto the surface of the 4' diameter sphere topping the Chromolume device. Due to the brightness limitations of video projection at the time, the images were projected using 7000w xenon-illuminated 35mm motion picture film (at 48 frames per second). The film's images were digitally pre-distorted to map correctly onto the sphere from the high projection angle in the Booth Theater.

The first time the concept of projection mapping was investigated academically was at the University of North Carolina at Chapel Hill in the late 1990s, where a team led by Ramesh Raskar worked on a project called Office of the Future, to connect offices in different locations by projecting people into an office space as if they were really there. By 2001, more artists began using projection mapping in artwork, and groups such as Microsoft began experimenting with it as a means of technological advancement.

== Methods ==
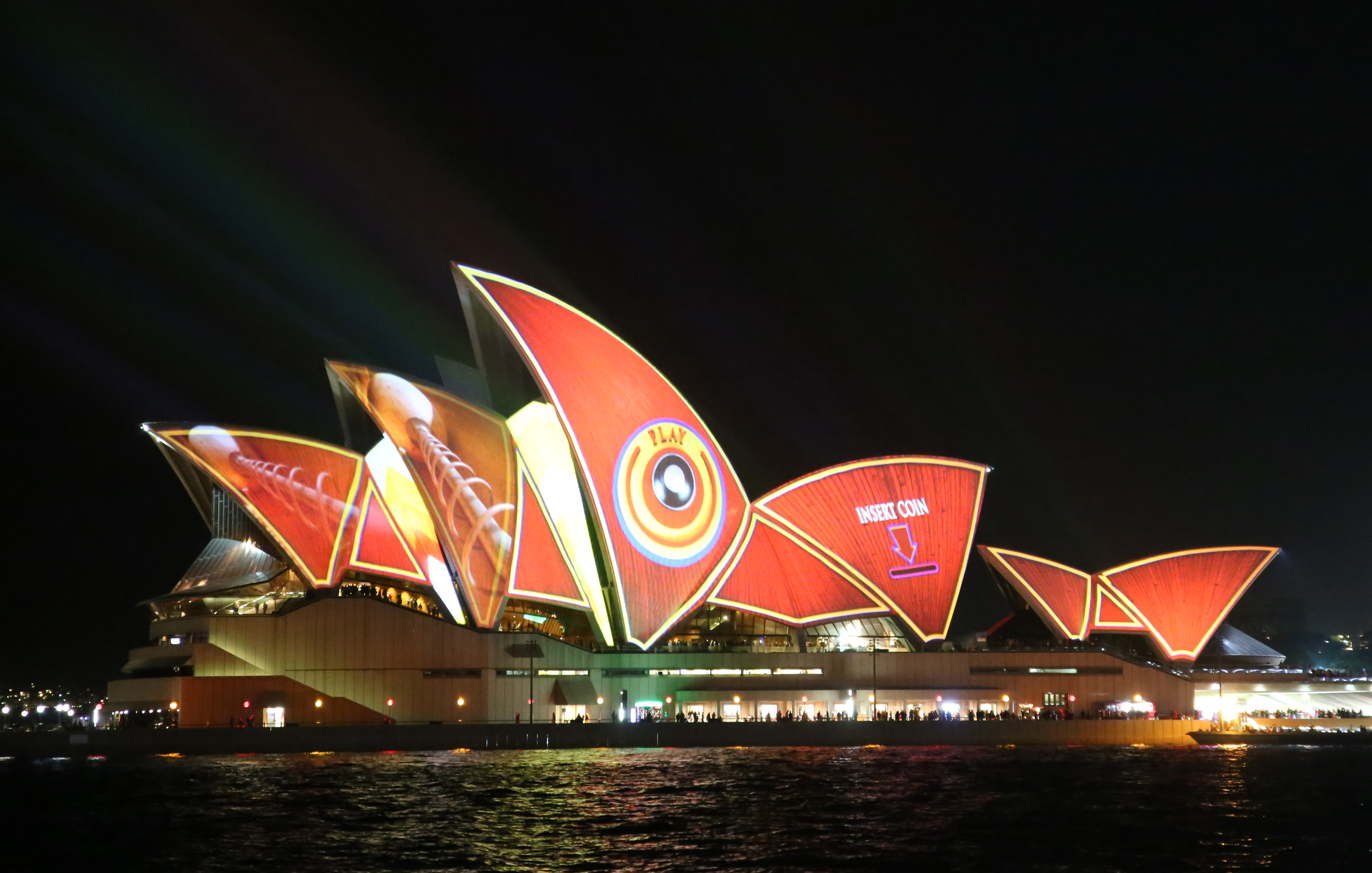
The Sydney Opera House during the 2013 Vivid Sydney projection display

After the object which will be projected on is chosen or created, software is used to map the corners of the video to the surfaces. First, one must choose the images or video to project. Each video is then placed on its designated surface. Alternatively, one may map the entire scene in 3D and attempt to project and mask the image back onto its framework. The next step is masking, using opacity templates to actually "mask" the exact shapes and positions of the different elements of the building or space of projection.

In 3D mapping, coordinates are defined for where the object is placed in relation to the projector. The projector's XYZ orientation, position, and lens specification result in a determined virtual scene.

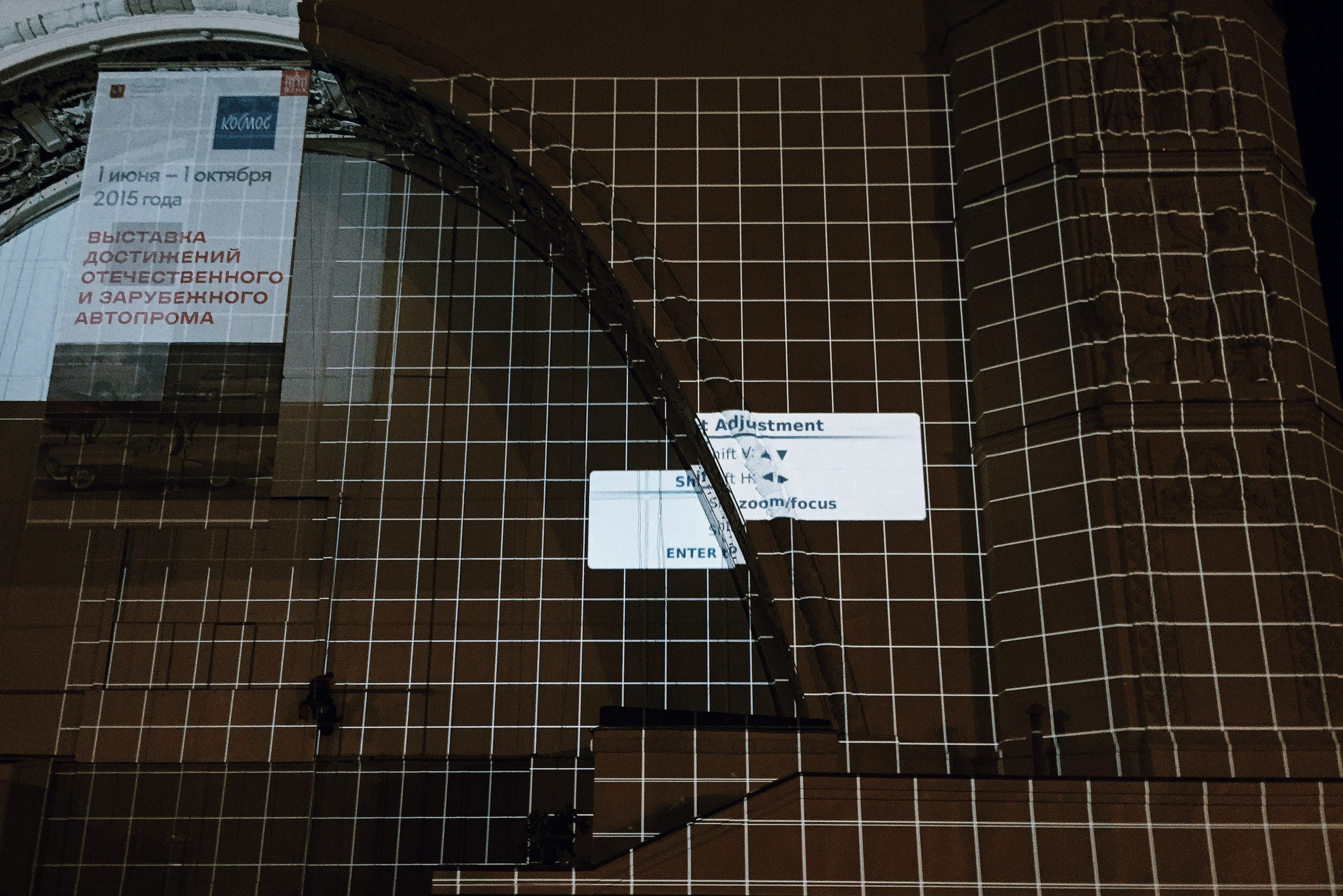
A projection mapping test grid projected onto a building

Adjustments are commonly made by manually adjusting either the physical or virtual scene for best results. Large projectors with 20,000 lumens output or greater are used for large-scale projections such as on city skyscrapers. Due to the scale and brightness some projects require, often large arrays of powerful projectors are combined into a single image through a method known as "edge blending" or "stacking". The result is a much brighter projection that maintains its seamless look. This technique is used for most large projection-mapping shows, and requires skill and patience to be set up with specialised software. For smaller productions, smaller, lower-output projectors are sufficient. In most cases, a 2200-lumen projector is adequate for projections under indoor light or theatrical lighting.

Projection mapping projects may involve both dedicated mapping software and general-purpose creative tools, such as Adobe Photoshop and Adobe After Effects. In modern practice, a wide range of specialized software is used, including commercial, paid platforms such as TouchDesigner and free or open-access tools such as Map Club, which vary in functionality, complexity, and intended use cases.

Projection mapping can be separated into four categories:

- VJing, where live events are augmented by (often interactive to music) projections which are fully dynamic, controlled live, and consist of pre-programmed videos and combinations of effects and effect overlays
- Theatrical, where projections are preset and scenes are cued on demand, usually in a set order, in conjunction with dance or onstage performance, often interactive
- Static/interactive, where a display is set up and loops or interacts with the environment and viewers via programming
- Video, where a generally long, non-interactive, segmented show is presented as a single fluid video that plays from beginning to end

== Advertisement ==
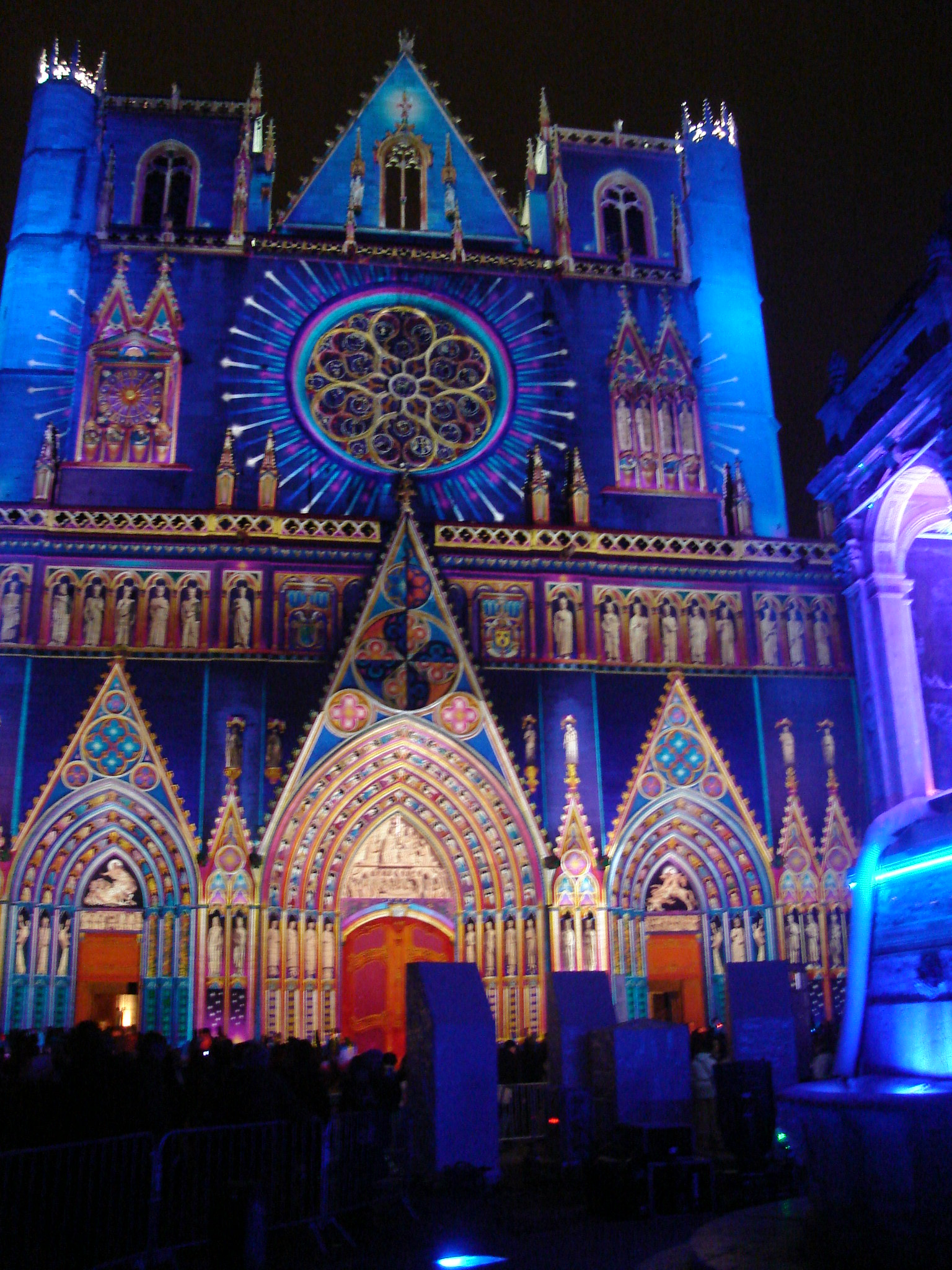
Projection mapping at Fête des Lumières by P. Warrener in Lyon (2008)

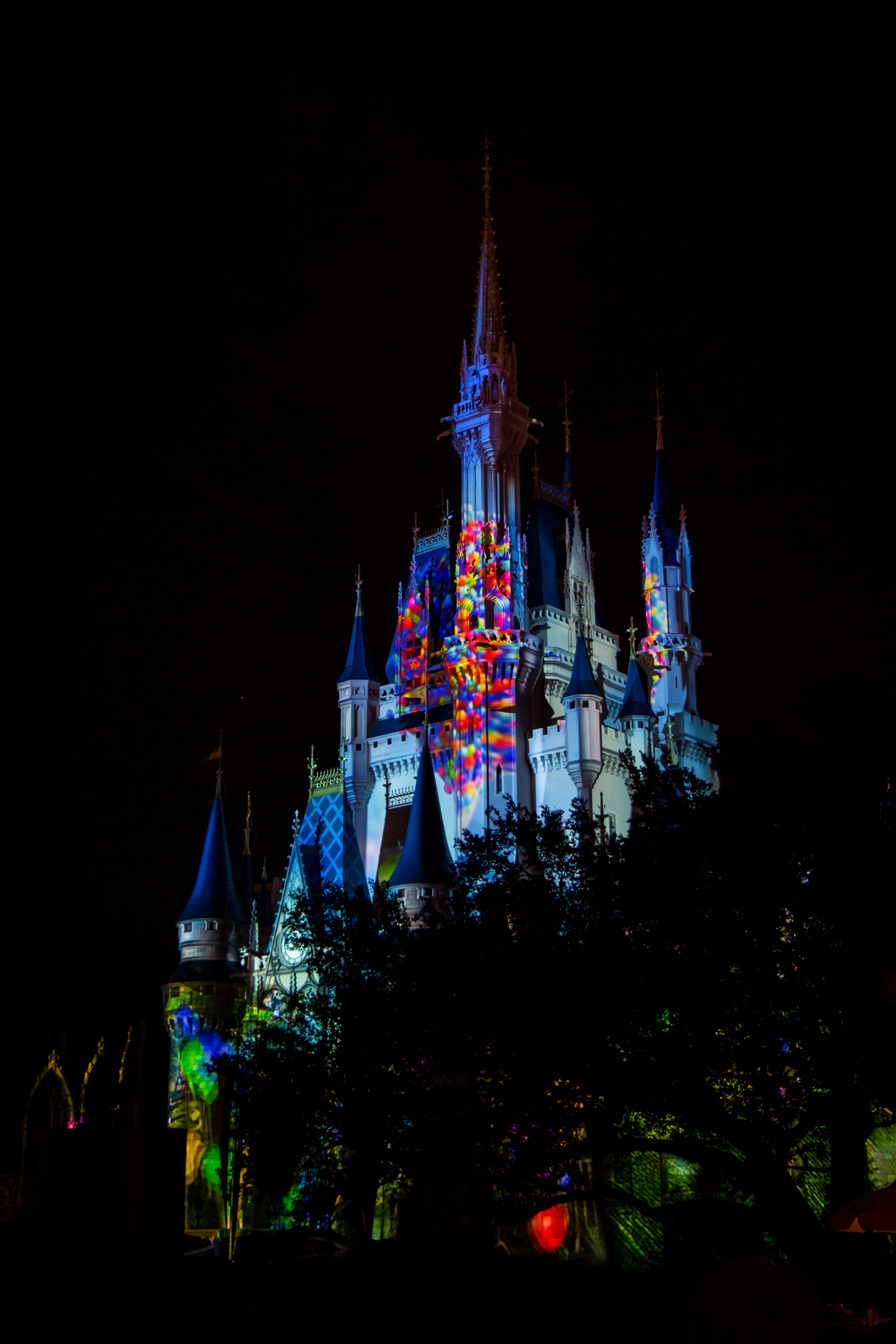
Projection mapping on Cinderella Castle in Magic Kingdom at Walt Disney World

Projection mapping first came to prominence through guerrilla advertising campaigns and video jockeys for electronic musicians. Large companies such as Nokia, Samsung, Unilever Pakistan, Pakistan Tobacco company, Bank Alfalah, Brighto Paints, Benson & Hedges, John Players Gold Leaf and BMW have since used video projections in marketing campaigns in cities across the world, commonly using mapping techniques to project scenes onto the sides of buildings. Projection mapping can also be interactive: Nokia Ovi Maps did a project where projections mimicked people's movements.

== Productions ==
Projection mapping has been used at conferences as a means of decoration or immersing audience members in an experienced theme. Images can be projected onto a flat surface, or onto an unusual object such as a car or a chair. The festival Fête des Lumières in Lyon, a festival to honour the Virgin Mary, has recently incorporated 3D mapping in their productions, creating the illusion of a giant pinball machine on the side of a building. Common techniques for these performances include 3D mapping and 3D projection to create the illusion of depth, as well as motion, such as crumbling buildings.The use of projection mapping in TV and films is becoming more popular. For the science-fiction film Oblivion (2013), the filmmakers used projection mapping to create an immersive environment. For a 2016 TV commercial, Audi used projection mapping to showcase the technology of the Audi Q7 car. The ad, "Projection of Greatness", was filmed with no CGI and used only content that was caught live in camera.

In the electronic dance music (EDM) community, it is becoming increasingly common for DJs to accompany their music with synced visuals, which can be either prerecorded or played live by a video jockey (VJ). Though normal projection screens are commonly used, some visual artists create special 3D installations to project onto. Many EDM artists employ projection mapping techniques.

== Art ==
Visual artists also use projection mapping for creative expression, sometimes to enhance existing creative media such as painting and drawing. Artists may use it as an avant garde form of expression as it is new technology that can turn their creative ideas into 3D projections, connecting with audiences in a new way. Video projections have appeared in urban centres such as New York City and London, where artists have used guerilla projections in public without any necessary approval. This way, artists can show their work in any location as anything and anywhere can be a canvas. Nearly 100 projectors, supplied by AV rental company Rentex for the 2025 Digital Graffiti Festival in Florida, were used by artists to project digital installations across nearly a mile of outdoor architecture. In France, Rencontres Audiovisuelles launched the Video Mapping Festival in 2018. Dedicated to projection mapping, the festival takes place in Lille and other cities across the Hauts-de-France region.

Often people also use it as a means of activism; the group Occupy Wall Street used it to project onto the Verizon Wireless building in New York City as a means to visually spread the word that Occupy Wall Street is still alive. The Japanese theatre play Mysteries of Yoshitsune I&II (2012–14) by Gackt is notable for the first major use of projection mapping in Japanese theatre stage play.

Projection mapping is frequently used by Walt Disney Imagineering and Walt Disney Creative Entertainment in the Disney Parks. Examples include The Magic, the Memories and You, Disney Dreams!, Celebrate the Magic, Once Upon a Time, Disneyland Forever, Halloween Screams, Believe... In Holiday Magic, Remember... Dreams Come True, Happily Ever After and most recently Sunset Seasons Greetings at Disney's Hollywood Studios.

When Paul Oakenfold became the first DJ to perform live at Stonehenge, projection mapping was used to transform the prehistoric monument into a spectacular light show. To avoid damage to the ancient stones, only 50 of Oakenfold's close friends were invited, and were required to wear noise-cancelling headphones to hear the music above the nearby A303 road.

== Activism ==
Projection mapping has also been used as a way to highlight political and social causes by groups such as Greenpeace and Led By Donkeys. The White Cliffs of Dover are frequently used to project messages of protest, support and memorials. In addition, Gota-Go campaigners used projection mapping to light up the President's office in Sri Lanka

== See also ==
- Bates Haunt
- Son et lumière (show)
- Shader lamps
- Projection augmented model
- GEAR (show)
