= Sleeping Beauty Castle =

Fairy tale castle from Disneyland

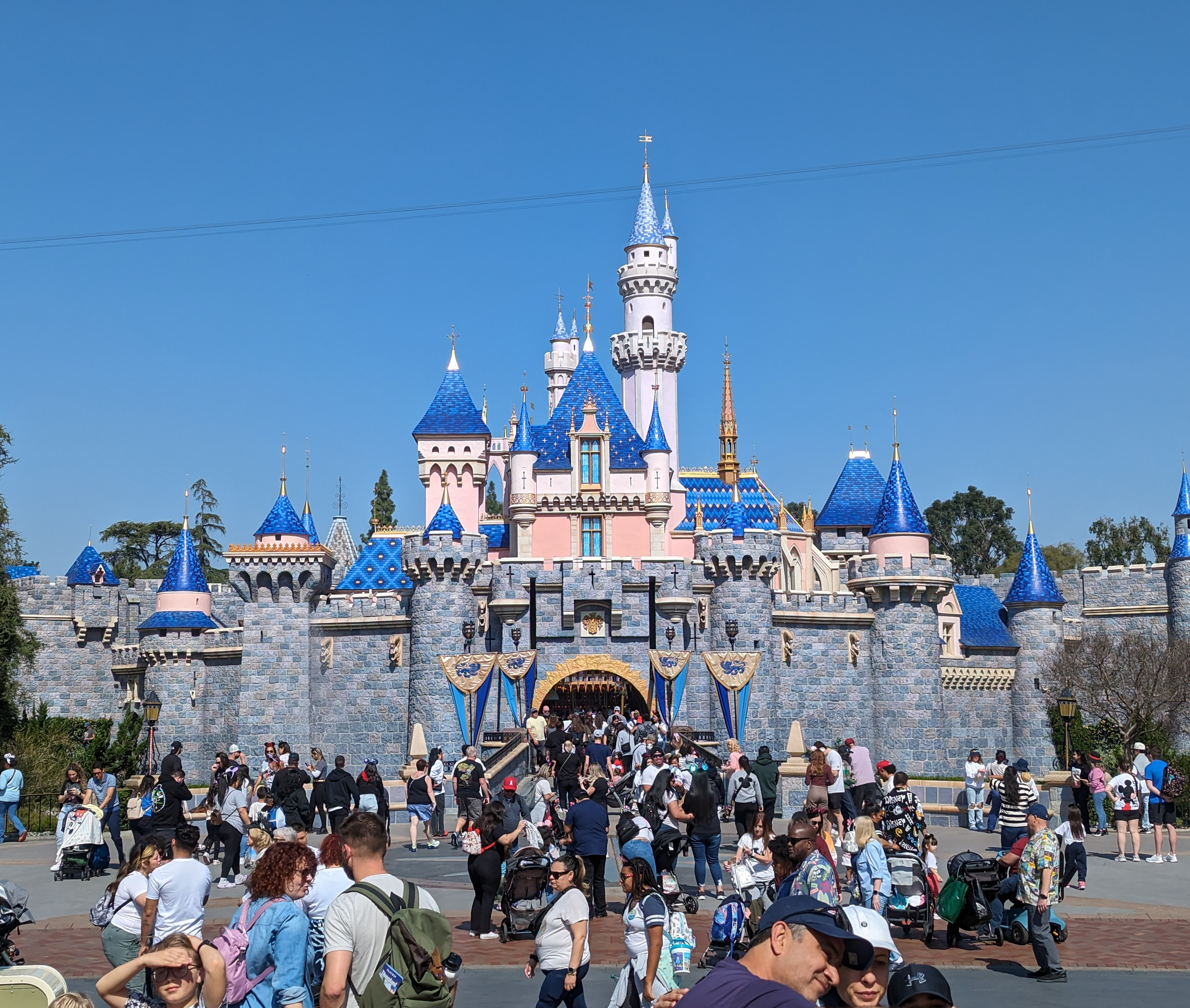
- Sleeping Beauty Castle at Disneyland Park in 2024

Disneyland
- Area: Fantasyland
- Coordinates: 33.81276°N 117.91894°W
- Status: Operating
- Opening date: July 17, 1955

Hong Kong Disneyland
- Area: Fantasyland
- Coordinates: 22.31262°N 114.04113°E
- Status: Removed
- Opening date: September 12, 2005
- Closing date: January 1, 2018
- Replaced by: Castle of Magical Dreams

Ride statistics
- Attraction type: Castle
- Theme: Sleeping Beauty
- Height: 77 ft (23 m)

Sleeping Beauty Castle is a fairy tale castle at the center of Disneyland and formerly in Hong Kong Disneyland. It is based on the late 19th century Neuschwanstein Castle in Bavaria, Germany. It appeared in the Walt Disney Pictures logos from 1985 to 2006 before being merged with Cinderella Castle, both familiar symbols of the Walt Disney Company. The version at Disneyland is the only Disney castle whose construction was overseen by Walt Disney.

A redesigned and larger version of the castle is used as the symbol of Disneyland Paris.

== Disneyland ==
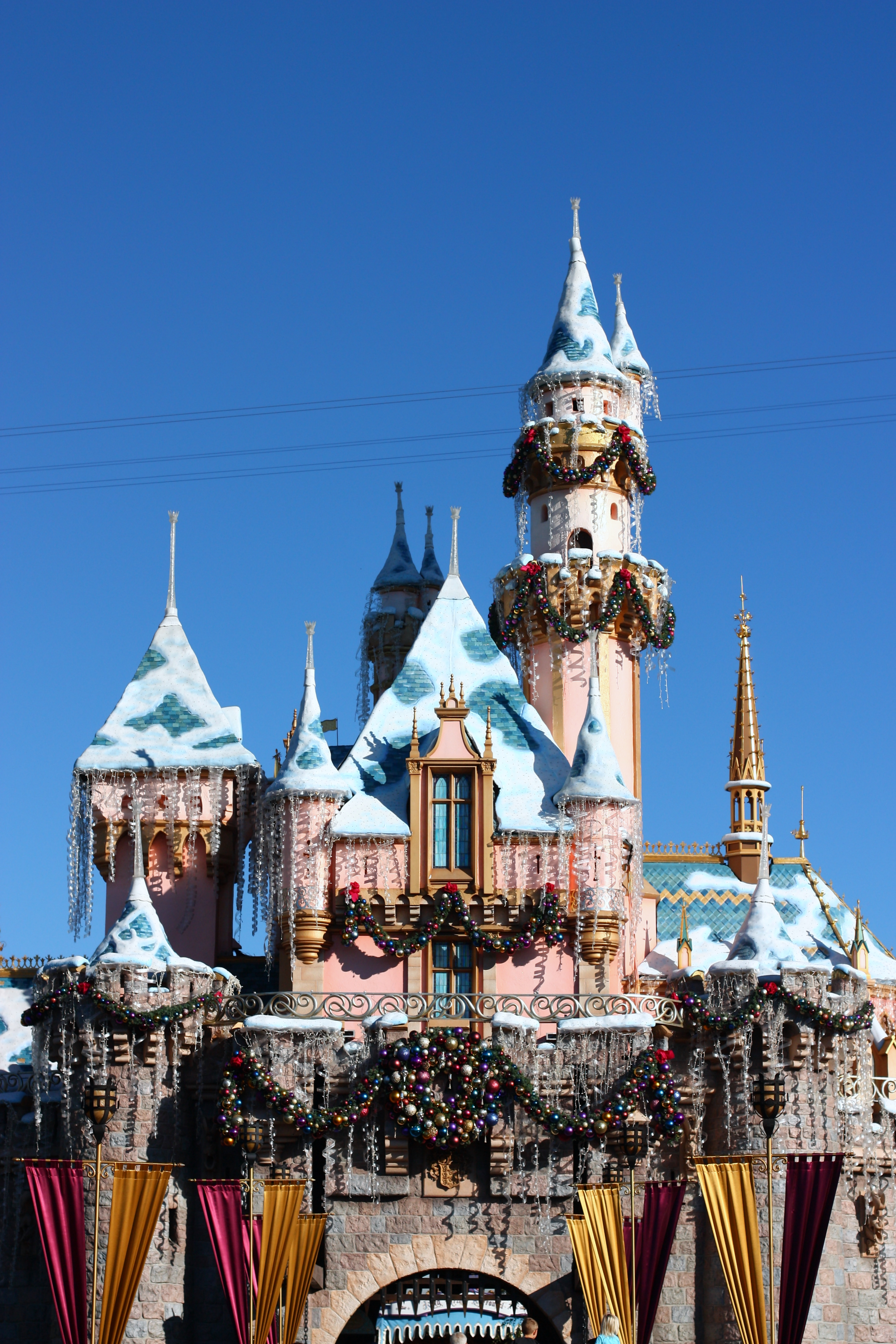
Sleeping Beauty Castle decorated for the 2010 holiday season

Disneyland's Sleeping Beauty Castle as it appeared during the 60th anniversary and the 2015 holiday season on New Years Day of 2016.

Disneyland's Sleeping Beauty Castle at night in 2005.

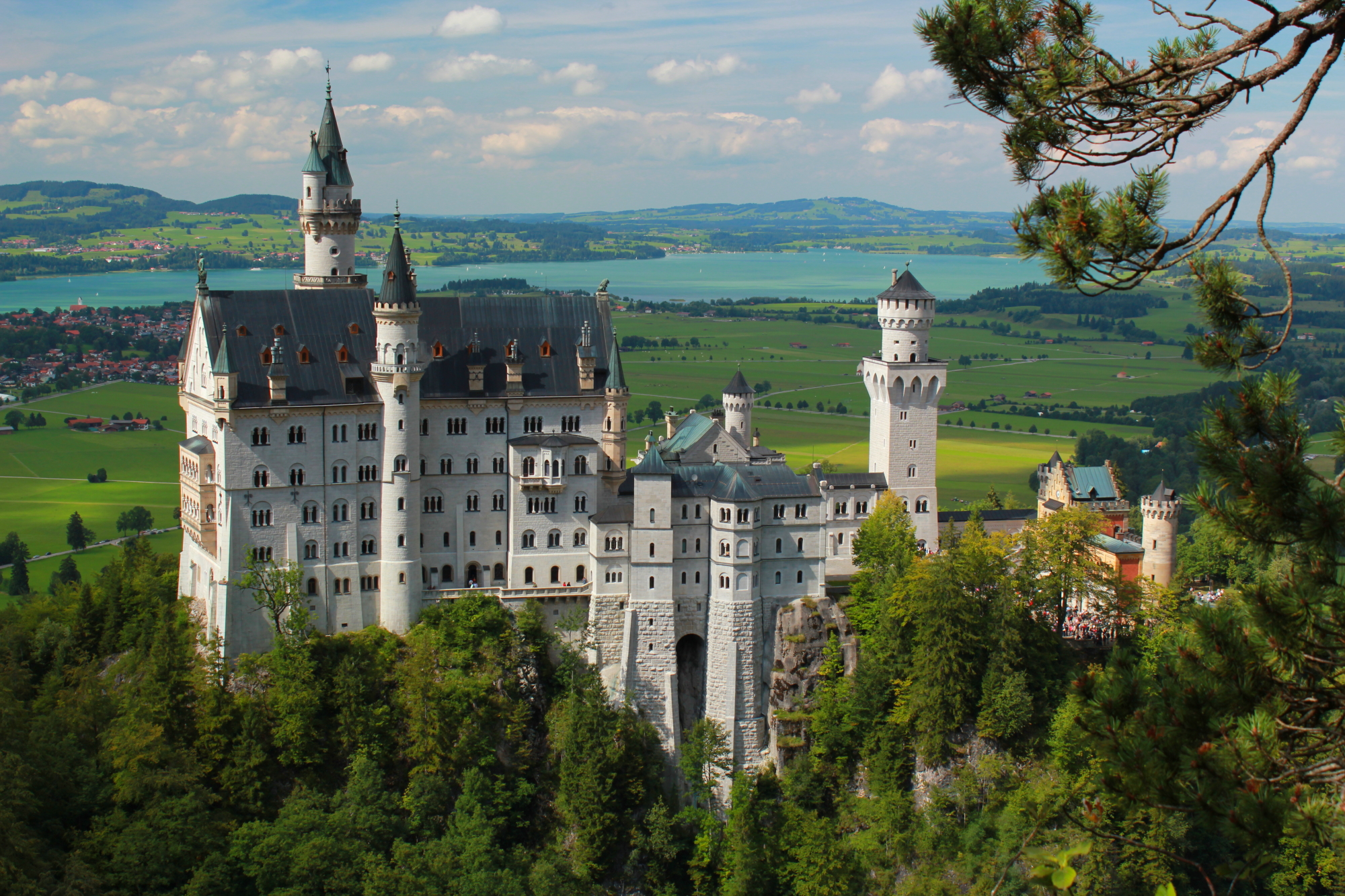
Neuschwanstein Castle

Opened July 17, 1955, the castle is the oldest of all Disney castles. Though it reaches a height of 77 feet (23 m), it was designed by Roland E. Hill to appear taller through the forced perspective technique; design elements are larger at the foundation and smaller at the turrets. The castle initially featured an empty upper level that was never intended to house an attraction, but Walt Disney was not satisfied with what he viewed as wasted space, and challenged his Imagineers to find some use for the space.

Beginning on April 29, 1957, the visitors were able to walk through the castle and view several dioramas depicting the story of Disney Animation's 1959 film Sleeping Beauty. The voice of Jiminy Cricket from Disney Animation's 1940 film Pinocchio singing "When You Wish Upon a Star" can be heard while entering or exiting Fantasyland through the castle. The original dioramas were designed in the style of Eyvind Earle, production designer for Sleeping Beauty, and were then redone in 1977 to resemble the window displays on Main Street, U.S.A. The walkthrough was closed for unspecified reasons on October 7, 2001; popular belief claims the September 11th attacks and the potential danger that ensued played a major factor in the closing. Disney spokesman John McClintock said that the 9–11 attacks rumors were not true. "I am aware of those rumors," he said. "But in 2001, it really wasn't resonating with guests. In the late 90s, early 2000s, arguably the most popular thing about Sleeping Beauty was that you could always get in because nobody went to it."

On July 17, 2008, Disney announced that the Sleeping Beauty Castle walkthrough would reopen in the style of the original Earle dioramas, enhanced with new technology. The walkthrough reopened on November 27, 2008 at 5 p.m., drawing long lines going as far back as the hub at the center of the park. Unlike previous incarnations, visitors who are unable to climb stairs or navigate the passageways of the castle can experience the walkthrough "virtually" in a room on the castle's ground floor. This room is lavishly themed and presents the closed-captioned CGI walkthrough recreation on a high-definition monitor. This same virtual recreation is included on the Sleeping Beauty 50th Anniversary Platinum Edition DVD.

The castle walkthrough entrance is on the west side of the building inside Fantasyland. Guests first see a large medieval-themed story book open to a page that announces the birth of the princess Aurora. After climbing the stairs inside, a scene depicts Aurora as a baby, being blessed with magic gifts by her fairy godmothers. Behind a glass window, there is an animation of the castle courtyard, and the king and queen watching as a large fire burns all the spinning wheels in the kingdom. At the top of the stairs, as guests reach the center of the castle's top level after passing a window showing Aurora asleep after pricking her finger on the spinning wheel while Maleficent looms over her, another window looks out on the castle's great hall, where everyone in the kingdom is asleep, including servants and the cat and dog. The second half of the walkthrough becomes darker, featuring appearances by Maleficent, her raven, and several gargoyles which fly out of her nearby castle, while passing doors where Maleficent's goons are seen. At the end, the prince fights against Maleficent's incarnation as a dragon, amid a forest of thorny brambles, and then a field of roses appears with doves flying above, as he kisses Aurora and breaks the spell. As guests exit the walkthrough at the bottom of the stairs on the east side of the castle after seeing Maleficent's shadow, another medieval-themed oversized book depicts an image of the prince and princess dancing together, as her dress changes colors from pink to blue and back again.

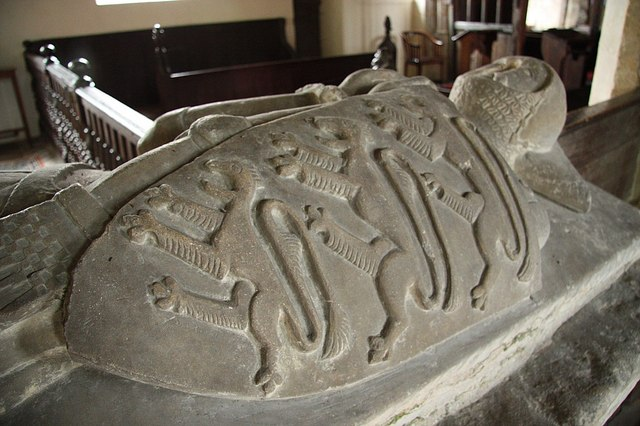
Effigy of Sir William D'Isney in the parish church of Norton Disney, Lincolnshire. The Disney family's three lions coat of arms appears on the castle's archway while an individual lion appears on castle banners.

The Disney family coat of arms hangs above the archway to the castle. It is composed of three lions passant in pale. It is known that the coat of arms was not originally on the castle, but was placed there sometime between June 1965 and July 1965.

At the rear of the castle, shaded by the archways and driven into the ground is a gold spike that is widely, but wrongly, believed to mark the geographical center of Disneyland. In reality, the spike is a surveyor's mark that was used to ensure that the castle bridge and entrance lined up with Main Street USA when the park was first constructed. The original geographical center of the Magic Kingdom was in the middle of the round park, where the Partners statue of Walt Disney and Mickey Mouse stands. The addition of Mickey's Toontown in 1993 moved the actual center of the park a few yards northward, but still on the hub side of the castle drawbridge.

=== The Happiest Homecoming on Earth (2005) ===
In celebration of Disneyland's 50th anniversary, Sleeping Beauty Castle received a makeover. The castle was repainted and five turrets were decorated with stylized crowns, each representing a decade in the park's history:

- The creation of Disneyland is represented by a pair of famous "Ears" peeking up over the horizon to see the wonders to come.
- "A World on the Move", otherwise known as the "New Tomorrowland" of 1967, is represented by rocket ships and accented by opalescent planets.
- The Blue Fairy represents the debut of the Main Street Electrical Parade (which was running at Disney California Adventure at that time).
- The Indiana Jones Adventure is represented by the evil Eye of Mara, guarded by snakes.
- The 50th Anniversary of Disneyland is represented by fireworks and Tinker Bell.

The castle and park decor were primarily gold, in a nod to a traditional fiftieth anniversary. Gold accents were added to the castle, including gold railings along the front turrets which doubled as fall protection. This railing was removed during the refurbishment leading to the 60th Anniversary and replaced with a retractable railing.

=== The Diamond Celebration (2015) ===
For Disneyland's 60th anniversary, the castle was covered with diamonds and glitter, with a large 60th medallion above the entryway. The castle design and overall decor were primarily diamond-themed, in a nod to a traditional sixtieth anniversary. Most of the decoration was removed shortly after the celebration, although the decorative faux roofs remained until January 2018, as the original roofs underneath the decorations were damaged during the celebration.

=== 100 Years of Wonder (2023) ===
The castle was decorated for Disney's 100th anniversary celebration, this time with iridescence and silver, complete with a giant 100th medallion above the entryway. Fountains were also installed in the moat in front of the castle. By October 14, 2023, most of the decorations were removed, while the last large one, the 100th medallion, was removed on November 10, 2023. The fountains were the only decoration remaining after the celebration.

=== 70th anniversary (2025) ===
In honor of the 70th anniversary, the castle was decorated in blue, pink, and yellow ribbons, and a 70th Anniversary medallion located in the center. For the 2025 holiday season, the 70th decorations were mixed in with the holiday decorations.

== Disneyland Park Paris ==
Sleeping Beauty Castle in 2010

Sleeping Beauty Castle (English for Le Château de la Belle au Bois Dormant) is at the center of Disneyland Park Paris and a continuation of Sleeping Beauty Castle first seen at Disneyland in California.

The Castle features two parts, a dungeon area in the base featuring an Audio-Animatronic dragon and, above, a concrete balcony walkthrough area with Sleeping Beauty–themed stained glass windows and tapestries. There are also several shops selling glass figures, ornaments and gifts.

Sleeping Beauty Castle with Disneyland was inspired by the Neuschwanstein Castle in Southern Germany. This European influence was fine for building a castle in Anaheim, but the fact that castles exist just down the road from Disneyland Paris challenged us to think twice about our design.

— Tony Baxter, executive designer Walt Disney Imagineering

The castle has received several overlays throughout the years. The first occurred during the park's first anniversary celebration in 1993, when the castle was dressed up as a cake complete with strawberries, icing and candles. This overlay was removed after the celebration ended. The cake overlay concept was later copied by Magic Kingdom's Cinderella Castle in 1996 for the 25th Anniversary of the resort.

During the fifth anniversary of Disneyland Paris in 1997, the castle was decorated in carnival masks, jester hats, frills and bells to promote Disney Animation's 1996 film The Hunchback of Notre Dame. This overlay lasted until the beginning of 1998.

During the tenth anniversary of Disneyland Paris in 2002, the front of the castle was fitted with a golden scroll displaying a large 10. The scroll and other anniversary material in the park were removed in 2003.

In 2007, the castle received another overlay, celebrating the park's fifteenth anniversary. It featured golden Disney characters displayed on the turrets and spires, each holding a candle, and Tinkerbell on the highest spire. The candles were illuminated each night during a special 'Candlebration' ceremony which took place on a raised temporary stage at Central Plaza, in front of the Castle. A huge illuminated gold plaque featuring a large '15' was hung on the front of the castle. This echoed the overlay from the tenth anniversary in 2002. The fifteenth anniversary and the 'Candlebration' ceremony ended on March 7, 2009, but for the 2007 and 2008 holiday seasons, the decision was made to continue the traditional Christmas overlay to the castle, but mixed in with the pre-existing 15th Anniversary decorations, a concept that would later be given to Disneyland for the 2025 holiday season.

The fifteenth anniversary overlay quickly followed on April 4, 2009 by Mickey's Magical Party, a "theme year" celebration held at the park. The castle was again overlaid, this time with a Mickey and Friends plaque over the main window, and the spire heads were changed from being characters to being 3 circles "of ribbon" representing Mickey Mouse. A more permanent Central Plaza stage was built outside the castle to host the "It's dance time... with Mickey and Friends" show.

The castle was repainted in a new color-scheme, restored and fitted with multicolored LED lighting in 2011 and again for 2021. For any modern nighttime spectacular shows, its moat was fitted with water fountains, the upper window was replaced by doors that open to reveal a LED lighted star and Central Plaza stage was removed in order to increase the viewing area.

== Hong Kong Disneyland ==
Sleeping Beauty Castle at Hong Kong Disneyland

Hong Kong's Sleeping Beauty Castle was a nearly identical copy of the original in California. However, the two castles were differentiated through very subtle details. Hong Kong Disneyland used a different color scheme compared to that of Disneyland, with more natural white and pink colours for the accents and cornice. It also had fewer trees surrounding its castle, which allowed a more open view to accompany the nightly fireworks show.

The castle closed on January 1, 2018 for a redesign as part of the park's 15th anniversary celebration. This redesign is meant to pay tribute to 14 Disney princesses and heroines. It has been renamed Castle of Magical Dreams.

=== Fifth anniversary ===
In celebration of Hong Kong Disneyland's fifth anniversary, Celebration in the Air, the castle was transformed into Tinker Bell's Pixie Dusted Castle. The castle was decorated with golden pixie dust, which sparkled and shimmered in the sun and was illuminated by night.

=== Tenth anniversary ===
Although no significant decorations were added to Hong Kong Disneyland's Sleeping Beauty Castle for the park's 10th anniversary, the nightly "Disney In The Stars" fireworks show was added with elaborate projection mapping with visuals to complement the display. This, however, resulted in the elimination of a few pyrotechnic elements launched from the front of the castle during the show.

== Logo usage ==
As Sleeping Beauty Castle is a Disney icon, it was used in the opening of the Walt Disney anthology television series from the show's beginning in 1954 until the late 70s, when it was replaced by the Cinderella Castle. It was also the logo of Walt Disney Pictures, Walt Disney Television, Disney Music Group and Walt Disney Studios Motion Pictures from 1985–2006. As of Pirates of the Caribbean: Dead Man's Chest in 2006, the logo is now 3D CGI and includes elements of both this castle and Cinderella Castle.

== See also ==
For the other castles:

- Cinderella Castle
- Castle of Magical Dreams
- Enchanted Storybook Castle
