= Ron Logan =

American businessman (1938–2022)

- Born: February 9, 1938
- Died: August 30, 2022 (aged 84); Orlando, Florida, U.S.
- Occupation: Producer
- Years active: 1980–2001

Ronald Logan (February 9, 1938 – August 30, 2022) was an American businessman who served as executive vice president of Walt Disney Entertainment (now Walt Disney Creative Entertainment). After retiring from the company in 2001, he was formally a professor at the University of Central Florida Rosen College of Hospitality Management in Orlando, Florida, United States.

== Life and career ==
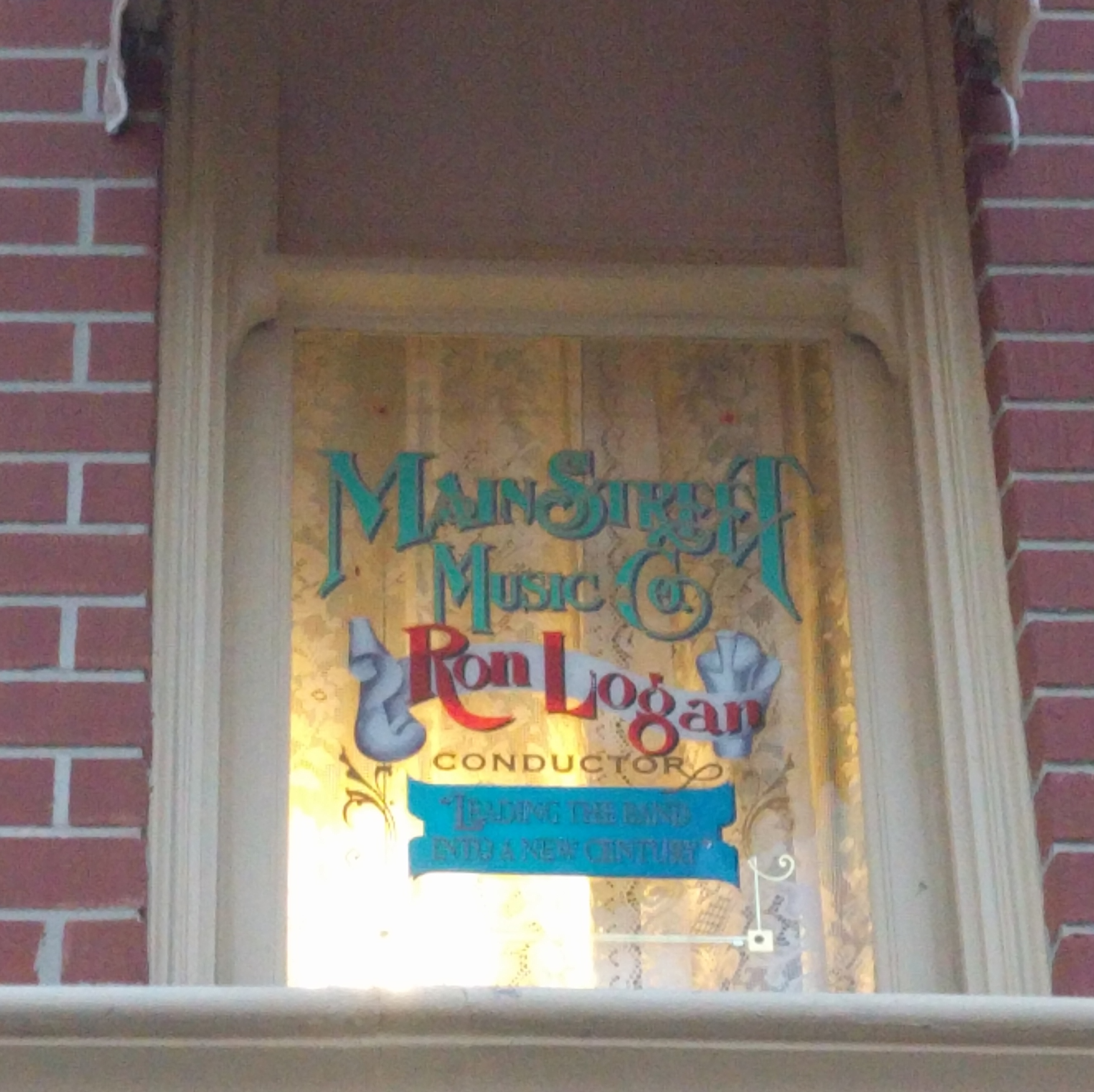
Logan's window on Main Street, U.S.A. at the Magic Kingdom above the Emporium

Growing up in Leavenworth, Kansas, Logan studied trumpet, violin, piano, and dance. He began performing professionally in the ninth grade and has performed as a trumpet player and singer on recordings, television, motion pictures, and with bands and lounge acts throughout the United States. He began his career with Disney in the 1960s as a trumpet player at Disneyland Park in Anaheim, California.

As executive vice president of Walt Disney Entertainment, Logan was responsible for creating, casting, and producing all live entertainment products for The Walt Disney Company, including the Disneyland Resort, the Walt Disney World Resort, Tokyo Disney Resort, Disneyland Resort Paris, The Disney Institute, Disney Business Productions, Disney Cruise Line, Disney Entertainment Productions, and Walt Disney Entertainment Worldwide.

Logan also was executive vice president of the Walt Disney Special Events Group, executive vice president of Disney Special Programs, Incorporated and the founder and first president of Disney Theatrical Productions, which produced Beauty and the Beast on Broadway and later, around the world.

He authored Walt Disney Entertainment - A Retrospective Look, an internal publication that documents the evolution of Walt Disney Entertainment from 1955 through 2000.

Logan retired from Disney in 2001 and later was an associate professor at the Rosen College of Hospitality Management at the University of Central Florida and the university's vice president of special events.

He died on August 30, 2022, at the age of 84.

== Education and achievements ==
Logan held BA and MA degrees in music and music education from UCLA. He was a founding member of the International Foundation for Jazz institution of classical music, a corporate advisory council established in support of the International Association of Jazz Educators. He was a board member of the Orlando Repertory Theatre (now Orlando Family Stage), served on the Board of Directors for the Famous People Players (Canada) and the International Theatre in Long Beach, California.

In 2007, Logan was honored with the Disney Legends Award, which is presented to individuals who have made a significant impact on The Walt Disney Company.

== Works ==
During Logan's tenure, Walt Disney Entertainment's productions included:

=== Disneyland Resort ===
- Fantasmic! – Disneyland Park
- The Lion King Parade – Disneyland Park

=== Walt Disney World Resort ===
- Grand Opening Ceremonies – Epcot, Disney-MGM Studios (now Disney's Hollywood Studios) and Disney's Animal Kingdom
- Legend of the Lion King – Magic Kingdom
- SpectroMagic – Magic Kingdom
- Skyleidoscope – Epcot
- Laserphonic Fantasy – Epcot
- Surprise in the Skies – Epcot
- IllumiNations: Reflections of Earth – Epcot
- Tapestry of Nations – Epcot
- Sorcery in the Sky – Disney-MGM Studios
- The Hunchback of Notre Dame – A Musical Adventure – Disney-MGM Studios
- Aladdin's Royal Caravan – Disney-MGM Studios
- Beauty and the Beast Live on Stage! – Disney's Hollywood Studios
- Voyage of the Little Mermaid – Disney's Hollywood Studios
- Fantasmic! – Disney's Hollywood Studios
- Lights, Motors, Action! Extreme Stunt Show – Disney's Hollywood Studios
- Festival of the Lion King – Disney's Animal Kingdom

=== Tokyo Disney Resort ===
- Disney Carnivale – Tokyo Disneyland
- Tokyo Disneyland Electrical Parade – Tokyo Disneyland
- Disney's Fantillusion – Tokyo Disneyland

=== Disneyland Paris ===
- Buffalo Bill's Wild West Dinner Show – Disney Village
- Disney ImagiNations Parade – Disneyland Park
- Moteurs... Action! Stunt Show Spectacular – Walt Disney Studios Park

=== Hong Kong Disneyland Resort ===
- Festival of the Lion King – Hong Kong Disneyland

=== Other venues ===
- Beauty and the Beast – Broadway in New York
- Tapestry of Nations Super Bowl XXXIV Halftime Show – Georgia Dome in Georgia
- Indiana Jones and the Temple of the Forbidden Eye Super Bowl XXIX Halftime Show – Joe Robbie Stadium in Miami
- 1987 Pan American Games – Indianapolis Speedway in Indiana
- DisneyFest – Asia
