= Disney's Fantillusion =

Former parade at Disneyland Paris and Tokyo Disneyland

Disney's Fantillusion Parade

Tokyo Disneyland
- Coordinates: 35.6326°N 139.8839°E
- Status: Removed
- Opening date: July 21, 1995
- Closing date: May 15, 2001
- Replaced: Tokyo Disneyland Electrical Parade
- Replaced by: Tokyo Disneyland Electrical Parade: DreamLights

Disneyland Park (Paris)
- Coordinates: 48.8707°N 2.7756°E
- Status: Removed
- Soft opening date: June 28, 2003
- Opening date: July 5, 2003
- Closing date: October 31, 2012
- Replaced: Main Street Electrical Parade

Ride statistics
- Attraction type: Parade
- Designer: Ron Logan
- Music: Disney's Fantillusion! (soundtrack)
- Duration: 30 minutes
- Sponsor: Nihon Unisys (Tokyo Disneyland)

Disney's Fantillusion!, sometimes known by its full name: Disney's Fantillusion Parade, and sometimes called Fandy, was a regularly scheduled night-time parade, created by Ron Logan, that performed nightly at Disneyland Paris during its summer and winter seasons. It featured floats and live performers covered in thousands of electronically controlled lights and a synchronized soundtrack controlled by a Dual-tone multi-frequency signaling (DTMF) tone broadcast along the parade route. The parade was originally created for Tokyo Disneyland where it ran for six years from 1995 to 2001. An updated version of the Main Street Electrical Parade replaced Disney's Fantillusion at Tokyo Disneyland known as the Tokyo Disneyland Electrical Parade: DreamLights as Fantillusion was sent to Paris to become the Disney's Fantillusion Parade.

== Background and history ==
The Disney's Fantillusion! parade premiered at Tokyo Disneyland on July 21, 1995 featured light, music, special effects and Disney characters.

Originally created for Tokyo Disneyland, Fantillusion! was developed by the team behind Fantasmic!, the show performed at Disneyland and Disney's Hollywood Studios, with the aim of condensing the story of Fantasmic! and putting it into a parade format. The parade's score was orchestrated by Bruce Healey, the same composer behind Fantasmic!'s theme and the music director at Disneyland.

The storyline of the parade is loosely based on the elements of Fantasmic!. The 31 floats were split in three acts. The parade starts with Tinkerbell, Mickey Mouse and the three fairies from Disney's Sleeping Beauty "wishing upon a star to bring the gift of Disney light" before being disrupted by Disney villains who "take the light and make it night", then ending with the Disney Heroes and Heroines who "turn the dark back into light".

Fantasmic! features Mickey Mouse in combat with Disney villains. The three main villains of the show are Maleficent, Ursula and Jafar - Maleficent is the lead villain in both shows, whereas Ursula is the supporting villain at Disneyland as is Jafar at Disney's Hollywood Studios. All three villains are featured in Disney's Fantillusion!. Chernabog from Fantasia and SpectroMagic, and the Queen from Snow White and Fantasmic, are also in the show.

Disney's Fantillusion! was designed and built for the parade route of Tokyo Disneyland. Each act would enter one portion of the park's parade route and then halt for a "show stop". The parade would the progress to the next section and halt again for the next show stop. This ensured that every guest watching the parade could see all three acts of the story.

After six years at Tokyo Disneyland, the parade closed at the end of its "Sayonara Disney's Fantillusion!" season on May 15, 2001.

After the parade was closed, the floats which had been bought by Disneyland Paris were left outside in the harsh conditions of Tokyo by the Oriental Land Company, where they were left exposed to the elements before being packed and transported to Europe the same year. The floats which had not been bought are thought to have been destroyed.

Of the 31 floats in the Tokyo version of the parade, 15 were transported to Disneyland Paris due to financial limitations. Of those 15, only thirteen floats were used in Paris' original production of the parade. The two floats that were bought, but never used were the Nasty Grotto and Murkey Dungeon. These floats were initially utilized to train new drivers but have since found other uses in providing spare parts. Although 15 were purchased, it's said that more floats were actually purchased by Paris and since they had been sitting backstage since 2001 until 2003, more floats were damaged due to the weather elements of Paris.

Paris also bought most of the original costumes used in Tokyo's production of the parade, but owing to electrical difficulties and European performers being larger than their Asian counterparts, some were unable to be utilised. New skirt-like costumes were fashioned for the Evil Villains sections as a replacement for the "Ghouls" costumes, and new Court Dancer costumes were created for the Happy Ending.

It took the floats more than 40 days to reach to Disneyland Paris from Tokyo Disney Resort. They traveled by cargo ship from Japan to Australia, then set off again through the Suez Canal and Mediterranean Sea before finally traveling around Spain and up the west coast of France to reach Le Havre. They were then taken by truck to Disneyland Paris where they were completely refurbished. The refurbishment of the parade floats took much longer than expected as the floats were badly damaged during transit. This meant that Disneyland Paris had to repair many of the floats, replace the thousands of tiny lightbulbs, convert their electrical system to the one used in Paris and enlarge the driving areas to fit the larger European drivers.

Original soundtrack composer Bruce Healey also carried out slight amendments to the original soundtrack, to better suit the European audiences, and the different setting. Meanwhile a new opening announcement was also recorded in English and French.

Disney's Fantillusion Parade! was due to debut in Paris in 2002, when the Main Street Electrical Parade would have been running for ten years, but instead, because of the problems with the floats and the fact that Disneyland Paris still pushed emphasis on their newly opened Walt Disney Studios Park, Fantillusion had to wait another year for its Parisian debut.

After many weeks of the parade rehearsing in Disneyland Paris after park closing hours, there was a special Fantillusion preview night on June 28, 2003 for Annual Passport holders. The parade then premiered to the public at the start of its first Summer season on July 5, running until August 31. Fantillusion returned for its first Christmas season in the resort from November 8 to January 4, and has been playing to crowds of fans and guests every Summer, Halloween and Christmas season since.

In Summer 2005, the "Bat Forest" float was removed from the parade in response to budget cuts and terrible guest feedback. As the only villain float with no character or physical transformation effects, the float was no longer seen as an important part of the parade. However, the "Bat Forest" float returned every Halloween night, carrying Jack Skellington and Sally from the 1993 film The Nightmare Before Christmas.

The Christmas season and the 50th anniversary of Disneyland in 2005 brought a further change to the parade, with the parade now running from Fantasyland to Town Square, rather than the reverse. While this brought with it a huge amount of technical troubles in the days after the switch, it allowed for better efficiency with the backstage parade preparation and meant guests would now follow the parade to the park's exit (in town square) instead of back into the park. This change also meant that show-stops were visible anywhere on the parade route, especially in the plaza just outside of the castle. This change was done because Disneyland Paris was facing the same problems that Disneyland had with Light Magic 8 years ago, people would line up along town square and follow the parade to It's a Small World, only to be blocked out by the 2nd/3rd showing outside of Le Château de la Belle au Bois Dormant, which caused overflowing inside most of the buildings on Main Street, USA, Liberty Arcade, and Discovery Arcade.

In 2012 at the end of Disneyland Paris' summer season Fantillusion was put on a temporary hiatus. By then, the Disney Dreams! night-time fireworks show was showing nightly. Fantillusion did not return for the Christmas season. No official confirmation has been given as to whether the parade has been axed or if it will return.

The parade performed for the last time on October 31, 2012 (Halloween night) with only the main floats and no floor performers.

== Introductions ==
The introduction to the parade at Tokyo Disneyland was notable for saying the phrase:
"From out of the night, comes the Magic of light... As Tokyo Disneyland proudly presents: Disney's Fantillusion!".
At Disneyland Paris, the introduction is in both English and French:
"Mesdames et Messieurs et vous les enfants. Disneyland Paris est d'heureux de vous presenter: the Disney's Fantillusion Parade!".

This translates to: "Ladies and Gentlemen, Boys and Girls. Disneyland Paris proudly presents: the Disney's Fantillusion Parade!".

== Tokyo Disneyland version ==
Act 1 - The Enchanted Fairy Garden: "We wish upon a star tonight, to bring the gift of Disney light!"

1. "Disney's Fantillusion!"
2. Mickey's Fantillusion
3. Unisys float
4. Enchanted Flower Wheel (retired in 1999)
5. Flora's Gazebo
6. Enchanted Flower Swing
7. Enchanted Dragonfly
8. Fauna's Carousel
9. Dragonfly Tower
10. Enchanted Web Garden (retired in 1999)
11. Merryweather's Gazebo
12. Enchanted Butterfly Flower

Act 2: The Evil Villains: "We take this light and make it night!"

1. Jafar
2. Nasty Grotto
3. Ursula
4. Bat Forest
5. Maleficent
6. Murky Dungeon
7. Evil Queen
8. Vulture Rock
9. Chernabog

Act 3 - The Happy Ending: "We Wish and Dream with all our might, and turn the dark back into light!"

1. Princess Ariel and Prince Eric
2. Fountain of Light #1
3. Snow White
4. Snow White's Castle
5. Belle and the Beast
6. Fountain of Light #2
7. Aladdin and Princess Jasmine
8. Fountain of Light #3 (retired in 1999)
9. Cinderella and Princess Aurora
10. Princess Minnie's Castle/Finale

"From the dark of night, comes the magic light. With its colours bright, and its brilliant light.
Breaks an evil spell, with these sparkling lights... from the Earth to the Sky! A fantastic Fantillusion! (Fantillusion!...)"

== Costumes ==
Like the floats, the costumes for the 160 performers sparkled and glowed and illuminated. The unique costumes were created using 88 individual designs, 290 different fabrics, and 10 different light mediums including mini-lights and fiber optics. The costumes work together with the music, choreography, and lights to produce a fantastical, magical effect.

== Disneyland Paris version ==
Act 1 - Mickey's Magical Garden

1. Mickey's Fantillusion
2. Tinkerbell's Gazebo
3. The Fairies' Carousel
4. Enchanted Butterfly Flower

Act 2 - The Disney Villains

1. Ursula
2. Jafar
3. Maleficent
4. Bat Forest (retired in 2005)

Act 3 - The Happy Ending

1. Snow White & Prince
2. Ariel & Prince Eric
3. Belle & the Beast
4. Jasmine & Aladdin
5. Princess Minnie's Castle

== Trivia ==
- Disney's Fantillusion Parade included 13 floats, 400,000 light bulbs and 60 km of cabling.
- Everynight, up to 50 performers take part for the parade. So do, approximately, 20 Guest Flows and more than 25 guest controls.
- One show can use over 600 litres of dry ice for the "show modes" and 9 tonnes of batteries are used every evening, recharged for the next day.
- Computers onboard each float control the lighting display, effects and music. The only thing that is sent to the units is a signal to keep the music in time with the underliner (background track) played in the park.
- Each float has its own orchestration and variation on the main theme, with music from the appropriate film telling the story along with character voices.
- At Disneyland Paris, Sleeping Beauty Castle was co-ordinated with the parade so it plays a part of the show and changes colour with the music, etc.

== Soundtrack ==
Disney's Fantillusion!

Soundtrack album by Tokyo Disneyland
- Released: 1995, 2001, 2003
- Recorded: 1994
- Genre: Theme Park
- Length: 38:47
- Label: Pony Canyon / Avex Trax
- Producer: Bruce Healey

Disney's Fantillusion! was the soundtrack for Tokyo Disneyland's production of Disney's Fantillusion!, released in 1995. It is currently out of print. Disneyland Paris have since released an incomplete and edited version of the Soundtrack.

=== Track listing (TDL only) ===
1. "The Enchanted Fairy Garden"
  - Fantillusion Fanfare and Announcement
  - Fantillusion Theme
  - Fantillusion, Flowers and Fairies Variation
  - Fantillusion, Dragonflies and Fairies Variation
  - Fantillusion, Butterflies and Fairies Variation
2. "Fairy Garden Fantasy"
  - Mickey Mouse March
  - A Smiling Song
  - The Wonderful Things About Tiggers
  - You Can Fly, You Can Fly, You Can Fly!
  - Heigh-Ho
  - When You Wish Upon a Star
3. "The Evil Villains"
  - Jafar (Prince Ali Reprise)
  - Ursula (Poor Unfortunate Souls)
  - Bat Forest
  - Maleficent (Maleficent's Theme)
  - Murky Dungeon
  - Evil Queen and Mirror (I've Been Tricked!)
  - Chernabog (Night on Bald Mountain)
4. "The Light Turns Into Night and the Ghouls Dance"
5. "The Happy Ending (Heroes and Heroines)"
  - Ariel and Eric (Part of Your World)
  - Fountain #1
  - Snow White and Prince (With a Smile and a Song/Heigh-Ho/Someday My Prince Will Come/One Song)
  - Fantillusion Theme, Castle Variation
  - Beauty and the Beast (Tale as Old as Time)
  - Fountain #2
  - Aladdin and Jasmine (A Whole New World)
  - Princess Aurora and Prince Phillip/Cinderella and Prince Charming (Once Upon a Dream/A Dream is a Wish Your Heart Makes)
  - Castle Finale (Minnie's Yoo-Hoo)
6. "The Happy Ending Medley"
  - Fantillusion Fanfare
  - Someday My Prince Will Come
  - So This is Love
  - Once Upon a Dream
  - Part of Your World
  - Beauty and the Beast
  - A Whole New World
  - Fantillusion Finale
7. "The Enchanted Fairy Garden Underliner - Left/Fantillusion Theme, Dragonflies and Fairies Variation - Right"
8. "The Evil Villains Underliner - Left/Jafar - Right"
9. "The Happy Ending (Heroes and Heroines) Underliner - Left/Beauty and the Beast - Right"

=== Character voices ===
- Mickey Mouse - Wayne Allwine
- Minnie Mouse - Russi Taylor
- Flora, Fauna and Merryweather - Susanne Blakeslee, Russi Taylor and Tress MacNeille respectively
- Jafar - Jonathan Freeman
- Ursula - Pat Carroll
- Maleficent - Linda Gary
- Evil Queen/Hag (TDL only) - Louise Chamis
- Magic Mirror (TDL only) - Tony Jay
- Chernabog (TDL only) - Corey Burton

== Development ==
In the "From One Lightbulb To Another" documentary, Disney Imagineer John Haupt discusses how their development of Fantillusion assisted them with the creation of the SpectroMagic parade: "A lot of the preliminary technical work for the Fantillusion parade was proof of concept in this parade. So its kind of the interim step between The Main Street Electrical Parade and Fantillusion".

== See also ==
- Fantasmic! (the show that this was based on)
- SpectroMagic (the parade that this was based on)
