= Paint the Night =

Parade at Disney theme parks

Paint the Night Electrical Parade

Hong Kong Disneyland
- Status: Removed
- Soft opening date: September 11, 2014
- Opening date: October 1, 2014
- Closing date: January 25, 2020

Disneyland
- Status: Removed
- Soft opening date: May 21, 2015 (60th Anniversary); May 14, 2025 (70th Anniversary)
- Opening date: May 22, 2015 (60th Anniversary); May 16, 2025 (70th Anniversary)
- Closing date: January 10, 2017 (60th Anniversary); August 20, 2026 (70th Anniversary)
- Replaced: Light Magic (1997); Main Street Electrical Parade (2022); Magic Happens (2024)
- Replaced by: Main Street Electrical Parade (2017, 2019, & 2022); Magic Happens (2027)

Disney California Adventure
- Status: Removed
- Soft opening date: April 12, 2018
- Opening date: April 13, 2018
- Closing date: November 7, 2018
- Replaced: Disney’s Electrical Parade (2001–2010)

Ride statistics
- Attraction type: Parade
- Music: "When Can I See You Again?" "Baroque Hoedown"
- Duration: 17 minutes (Disneyland)
- Wheelchair accessible

Paint the Night Parade is a nighttime parade at the Disneyland Resort in Anaheim, California, and formerly at Hong Kong Disneyland on Lantau Island, Hong Kong.

The Hong Kong version premiered on September 11, 2014, as part of the park's 9th anniversary. The California version debuted at Disneyland on May 22, 2015, as part of the park's 60th anniversary. The parade is a spiritual successor to the long-running Main Street Electrical Parade, which has appeared at numerous Disney parks worldwide in several different incarnations since June 17, 1972. On January 25, 2020, Hong Kong Disneyland's version of the parade had its final performance due to the COVID-19 outbreak's impact on China.

In October 2024, it was announced that the California version will return as part of Disneyland's 70th anniversary celebration. Paint the Night returned to Disneyland on May 14, 2025. The parade paused between November 10, 2025, and January 30, 2026, for the 2025 Christmas season. The parade was originally set to run through the end of the 70th anniversary on August 9, 2026, but was extended to August 20, 2026.

== Hong Kong Disneyland ==
Disney Paint the Night Parade (Chinese: 迪士尼光影匯, Jyutping: dik6 si6 nei4 gwong1 ying2 wooi6) premiered at Hong Kong Disneyland on October 1, 2014. This is the first time Walt Disney Parks and Resorts created a fully LED parade, and featured seven original floats containing over 740,000 individual lights.

The Hong Kong version of the parade used a newly arranged version of the Main Street Electrical Parade's theme song, "Baroque Hoedown," alongside a Cantonese arrangement of Owl City's "When Can I See You Again?" from Wreck-It Ralph. In the original version of the Hong Kong version of the parade, there was a show stop in which the performers were able to interact with the interactive LED Paintbrushes sold to audience members. The show stop used an original song in Cantonese and English called "Paint the Night". The show stop was discontinued in November 2015.

The interactive "Mickey Mouse Paintbrushes," which guests can purchase in the park, allow them to interact with the performers by changing the colors of their costumes when the brushes are activated. Wearable merchandise items include the "Mickey Glow Mitt" and "Minnie Glow Bow," which change colors throughout the show through the use of RFID-enabled technology.

=== Units ===
The Hong Kong version contained the following parade units:

Logo for the Hong Kong version of Paint the Night

- Tinker Bell and Friends (2014–2020)
- Monsters, Inc. Dance Party (2014–2020)
- Cars Electric Roadway Jam (2014–2020)
- The Little Mermaid Electric Watercolours (2014–2020)
- Belle's Candlelight Dreams (2014–2020)
- Toy Story Electric Rodeo (2014–2020)
- Mickey & Friends Lightastic Finale (2014–2020)

== Disneyland Resort ==
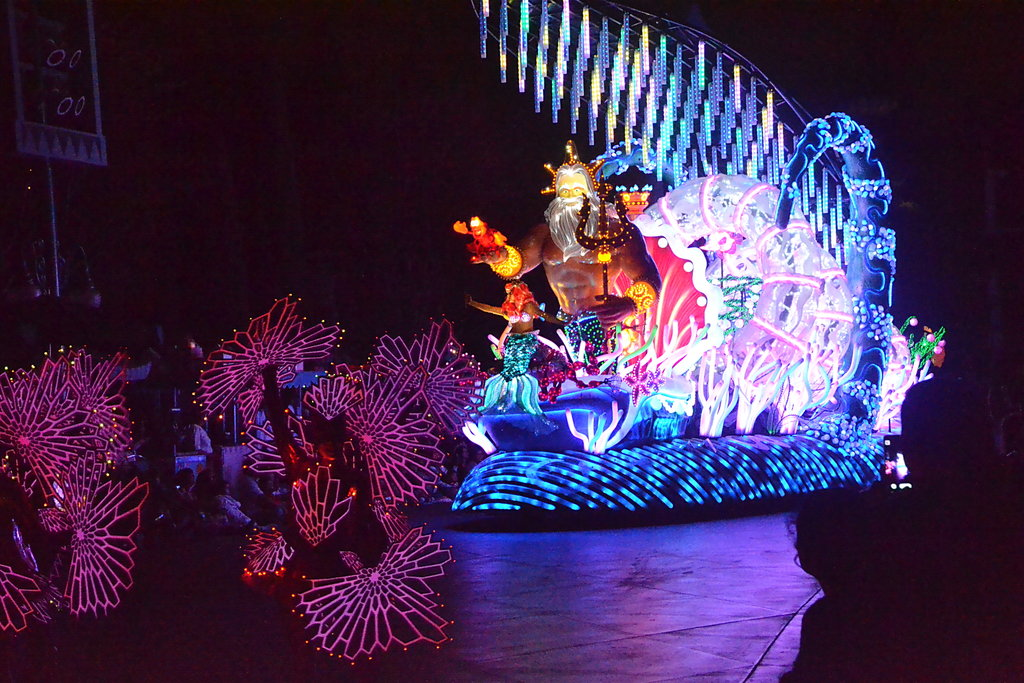
The Little Mermaid float at Disneyland, California in 2015.

The Paint the Night Parade (or Paint the Night Electrical Parade, as it is titled within the show) opened May 22, 2015, as part of Disneyland's Diamond Celebration, in commemoration of its 60th anniversary. This version of the parade utilizes over 1.5 million LED lights, special effects, and features 76 performers. The California version of the parade was inspired by the Main Street Electrical Parade. It had an opening announcement similar to that used in the Main Street Electrical Parade. It is Disneyland's first all LED parade. The parade lasts approximately 17 minutes. During the Diamond Celebration, the entire 24-hour event was streamed live via internet by the Disneyland Resort, including the premiere of Paint the Night parade on May 22, 2015. Like the Hong Kong version, the parade jointly features arrangements of Jean-Jacques Perrey and Gershon Kingsley's "Baroque Hoedown" and Owl City's "When Can I See You Again?". This version (in English) features new lyrics for the parade along with vocals and arrangement from Adam Young of Owl City.

At Disneyland Park, Paint the Night made its last regular performance on September 5, 2016, and returned as a seasonal offering for the 2016 holiday season, closing on January 10, 2017. The original Main Street Electrical Parade returned to Disneyland Park on January 19, 2017, for a limited-time run. The parade returned in a modified form at Disney California Adventure from April 12, 2018, through November 7, 2018. Portions of the Little Mermaid float were too tall to clear the Red Car Trolley's overhead wires; the Frozen float was removed entirely for this run. A new float themed around Disney•Pixar's The Incredibles joined the parade for the grand opening of Pixar Pier on June 23 and for the release of Incredibles 2 which hit theaters on June 15, 2018.

In October 2024, Disneyland announced on its Instagram that Paint the Night would return to Disneyland Park as part of the Disneyland Resort's 70th anniversary celebration. On March 6, 2025, Disneyland revealed the Frozen float would re-join the parade upon its return to the resort on May 16. It did not run for the 2025 holiday season, and held its final performance on August 20, 2026.

=== Units ===
The Disneyland version of the parade includes four original floats not present in the Hong Kong version. This version does not include show stops.

The Disneyland parade contains the following parade units:

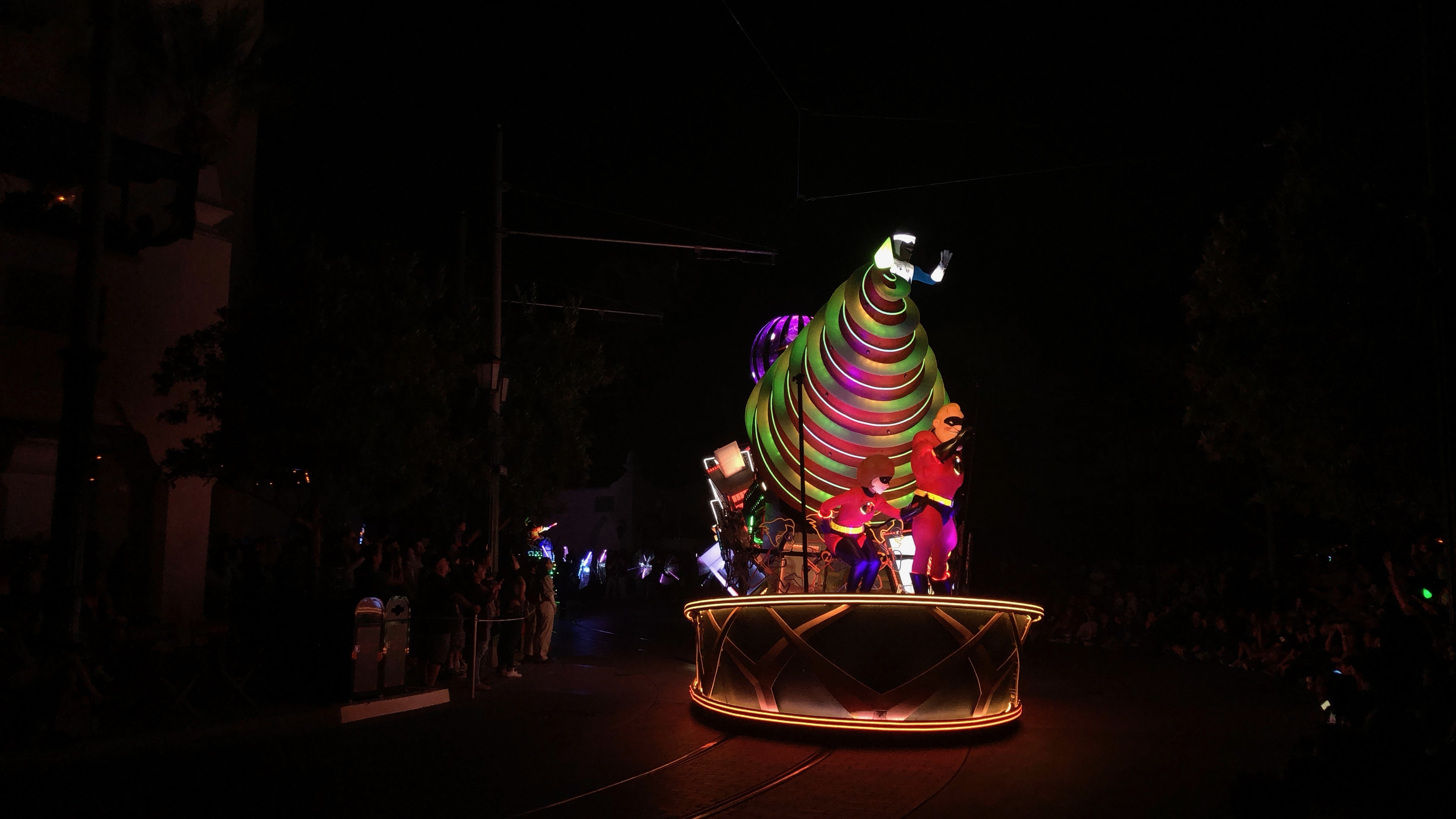
Incredibles Unit in the Paint the Night Parade at Disney California Adventure in 2018.

Current Parade Floats

- Peter Pan and drum unit (featuring Rosetta, Silvermist, Iridessa, Tinker Bell, Peter Pan, Tigger from Winnie the Pooh, Genie from Aladdin and Lumière from Beauty and the Beast) (2015–2018, 2025–Present)
- Monsters, Inc. Dance Party (featuring Sulley and Mike) (2015–2018, 2025–Present)
- Cars Electric Roadway Jam (2015–2018, 2025–Present)
- The Little Mermaid Electric Watercolors (featuring Ariel, Sebastian, Flounder, King Triton and Marlin and Nemo from Finding Nemo) (2015–2018, 2025–Present)
- Toy Story Electric Rodeo (featuring Woody, Jessie, Buzz Lightyear and Squeeze Toy Aliens) (2015–2018, 2025–Present)
- Candlelight Dreams (featuring Belle, Rapunzel and Cinderella) (2015–2018, 2025–Present)
- Frozen Fractals (featuring Anna, Elsa and Olaf) (2015–2017, 2025–Present)
- Mickey's Lightastic Finale (featuring Goofy, Donald Duck, Minnie Mouse and Mickey Mouse) (2015–2018, 2025–Present)

Former Parade Floats

- The Incredibles Float (featuring Mr. Incredible, Elastigirl, Frozone, Dash, Violet and Jack-Jack) (2018)
