= Andrea Michaels (disambiguation) =

Andrea Michaels is an Australian politician in the Parliament of South Australia.

Andrea Michaels may also refer to:

- Andrea Carla Michaels (born 1949), American crossword constructor
- Andrea Elizabeth Michaels, American event producer and author
