= Main Street Electrical Parade =

Parade at Disney theme parks

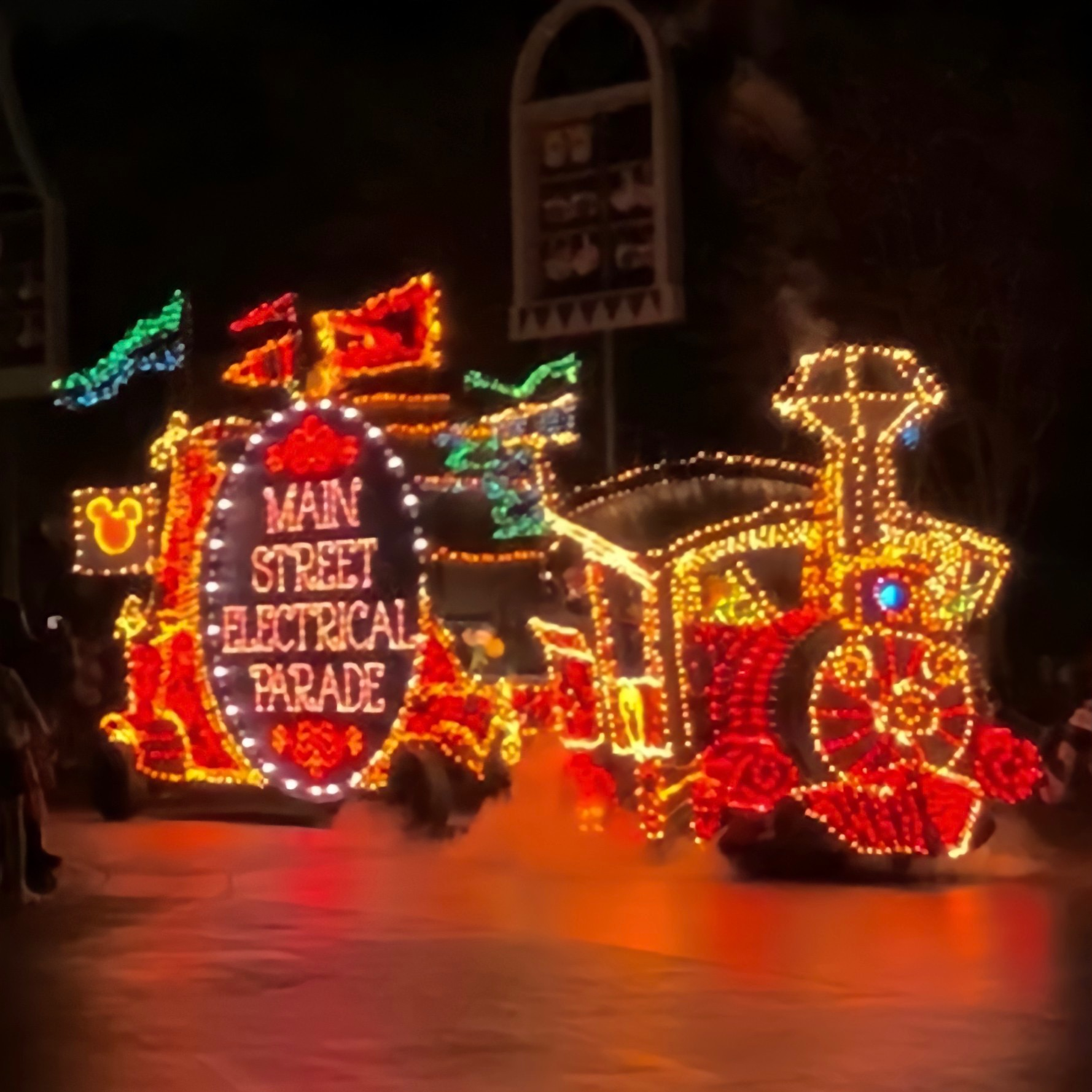
- The Casey Junior and drum float displaying the parade's title logo at Disneyland in 2022.

Disneyland
- Status: Closed
- Soft opening date: January 19, 2017 (fourth run); April 20, 2022 (sixth run)
- Opening date: June 17, 1972 (first run); June 11, 1977 (second run); 1985 (third run); January 20, 2017 (fourth run); August 2, 2019 (fifth run); April 22, 2022 (sixth run)
- Closing date: 1974 (first run); 1982 (second run); November 25, 1996 (third run); August 20, 2017 (fourth run); September 30, 2019 (fifth run); September 1, 2022 (sixth run)
- Replaced: America On Parade (1976); Flights of Fantasy Parade (1983); Paint the Night (2015–2017); Magic Happens (2020) (original version)
- Replaced by: America On Parade (1975); Flights of Fantasy Parade (1983); Light Magic (1997); Magic Happens (2020; 2023) (original version; updated version); Paint the Night (2025)

Magic Kingdom
- Status: Removed
- Soft opening date: June 5, 2010 (third run)
- Opening date: June 11, 1977 (first run); May 21, 1999 (second run); June 6, 2010 (third run)
- Closing date: September 14, 1991 (first run); April 1, 2001 (second run); October 9, 2016 (third run)
- Replaced: SpectroMagic
- Replaced by: SpectroMagic (1st & 2nd Tenures); Disney Starlight: Dream the Night Away (3rd Tenure)

Tokyo Disneyland
- Name: Tokyo Disneyland Electrical Parade (1985–1995); Tokyo Disneyland Electrical Parade: DreamLights (2001–present)
- Status: Operating
- Soft opening date: June 1, 2001 (DreamLights)
- Opening date: March 9, 1985 (original); June 17, 2001 (DreamLights)
- Closing date: June 21, 1995 (original)
- Replaced: Disney's Fantillusion
- Replaced by: Disney's Fantillusion
- Disney Premier Access available at Tokyo Disneyland

Disneyland Park (Paris)
- Status: Removed
- Opening date: April 12, 1992
- Closing date: March 23, 2003
- Replaced by: Disney's Fantillusion

Disney California Adventure
- Name: Disney's Electrical Parade
- Status: Removed
- Soft opening date: July 2, 2001 (original)
- Opening date: July 3, 2001 (original); June 12, 2009 (updated)
- Closing date: January 5, 2009 (original); April 18, 2010 (updated)
- Replaced by: Paint the Night (2018)

Ride statistics
- Attraction type: Parade
- Sponsor: Nihon Unisys (Tokyo Disneyland, 1985-1995); Philips (Disneyland Paris, 1992-2002); General Electric (Disneyland, Farewell Season, 1995-1996); Sylvania (California Adventure, 2006-2010); Nihon Unisys/Biprogy (Tokyo Disneyland, DreamLights)

The Main Street Electrical Parade is a nighttime parade that first premiered at Disneyland in 1972 and has since become the longest running parade in Disney history, performing at Disney parks worldwide. Created by Robert Jani and project director Ron Miziker, the parade features floats and live performers covered in over 600,000 electronically controlled LED lights. The parade uses a synchronized soundtrack featuring a signature theme, "Baroque Hoedown" by Perrey and Kingsley, which is arranged to complement each float.

The original parade at Disneyland in California ran from 1972 to 1996, and returned for limited engagements in 2017, 2019, and 2022. The neighboring Disney California Adventure park hosted the parade between 2001 and 2010. Another version, at Magic Kingdom in Florida's Walt Disney World Resort, ran from 1977 to 1991, 1999 to 2001, and 2010 to 2016.

The parade has also spun off several other versions that ran or continue to run at Disney parks around the world. An updated version has run at Tokyo Disneyland as Tokyo Disneyland Electrical Parade: DreamLights since 2001. In 2014, Hong Kong Disneyland premiered a spiritual successor to the Main Street Electrical Parade, the Paint the Night Parade. An extended version of Paint the Night premiered at Disneyland on May 22, 2015, as part of the park's 60th anniversary celebration, and moved to Disney California Adventure on April 12, 2018. Paint the Night returned to Disneyland Park on May 14, 2025, for Disneyland's 70th anniversary celebration.

The original Disneyland version of the parade ran at Walt Disney World's Magic Kingdom as "Disney's Main Street Electrical Parade" from June 5, 2010, to October 9, 2016, when it closed in preparation for a limited-time run at Disneyland. The Disneyland run started on January 19, 2017, and was planned to run through June 18, 2017, but due to popular demand, Disney extended the parade's run to August 20, 2017.

On June 28, 2019, Disneyland officially announced that the parade would once again return to Disneyland Park for another limited engagement run, which began on August 2, 2019, and ran through September 30, 2019.

On October 26, 2021, the Disney Parks' TikTok account released a video teasing the parade's return to Disneyland again. On November 20, 2021, it was announced at Destination D23 that the parade will return in spring 2022. Disney confirmed on February 22, 2022, that the parade would return on April 22, 2022, as well as revealing a reimagined To Honor America finale float that is more inclusive. The parade's 50th anniversary run began on April 20, 2022, during a soft opening that was live streamed on the Disney Parks Blog and had its "final performance of the season" on September 1, 2022.

A spin-off of the parade performed at Disneyland Paris from January 8, 2024, to January 9, 2025, called the Disney Electrical Sky Parade, which honored the Disneyland Paris version of the parade using drones, water effects, projections, and pyrotechnics on drones.

== History ==
=== Inspiration ===
The predecessor to the 1972 Disneyland Main Street Electrical Parade was the Electrical Water Pageant, a show consisting of fourteen 25-foot-tall (7.6 m) screens decorated with electrical lights and presented on Walt Disney World's Seven Seas Lagoon from 1971 to the present. Not long after the Electrical Water Pageant debuted, Card Walker commissioned the development of what became the Main Street Electrical Parade to provide Disneyland with a similar nighttime visual spectacle. The parade's design used nickel–cadmium batteries, which the Disney movie studio had recently started using, and Italian-made miniature bulbs that Disneyland staff had seen in light displays along Michigan Avenue in Chicago, Illinois. Disney arranged for the parade's original floats to be constructed by Silvestri, the Chicago-based company responsible for those holiday displays.

Two months to deadline, Disney discovered the float contractor was far behind schedule and decided to finish the floats themselves in a backstage area at Disneyland. Disney brought on welders, electricians and other temporary workers to assemble the floats and hand-tint and install 500,000 bulbs. The engineers who helped create the parade also created the first automated parade show-control program. This allowed the 2,000-foot (610 m) long parade route to contain multiple radio-activated "trigger zones". Using radio-activated triggers as each float entered a zone, the audience would hear float-specific music through the park's audio system. Each zone was between 70 and 100 feet (21 and 30 m) long, and the zoned system meant that every person watching the parade would experience the same show, no matter where they stood along the parade route.

=== Early years ===
The first rehearsal was a "disaster"; a float crashed into a building on Main Street, U.S.A., and some performers' costumes emitted sparks. Despite these obstacles, the parade successfully debuted on schedule on June 17, 1972. The original parade floats featured the Blue Fairy, a large drum pulled by the Casey Jr. Engine, Cinderella, a Chinese dragon, and a circus calliope. Until 1977, some of the floats, such as the elephant train and the American flag finale, were flat screens on manually pushed rolling platforms similar to the Electrical Water Pageant.

The Main Street Electrical Parade had counterparts of the same name and layout at Magic Kingdom in the Walt Disney World Resort, which ran from June 11, 1977, to September 14, 1991. It was replaced by a similar parade called SpectroMagic, which ran from October 1, 1991, to May 20, 1999, reopened on April 2, 2001, and ended on June 4, 2010. On April 12, 1992, the version from Magic Kingdom went to Disneyland Park at Disneyland Paris and ran there until March 23, 2003. It was then replaced by Fantillusion, a nighttime parade from Tokyo Disneyland that had earlier replaced the Tokyo version of the Main Street Electrical Parade, which ran from March 9, 1985, to June 21, 1995.

On June 14, 1997, a presentation of the Electrical Parade called the "Hercules Electrical Parade", ran on Broadway, Manhattan, New York City for the opening of Disney's New Amsterdam Theater and the film Hercules. Disney arranged for the lights to be all turned off on about eight blocks of Broadway up to the theater. All businesses complied, with the exception of Disney rival Warner Brothers. It was led by a custom Hercules title unit made for this one time only use. It was shown on national television on a one-hour promotional program featuring the music and making of Hercules.

=== Later years ===
The Main Street Electrical Parade closed at Disneyland on November 25, 1996, after a 24-year run. Light bulbs certified as having been part of the show were sold to collectors. The show's replacement, the Light Magic parade, opened in 1997 to disappointing results. Disney quickly cancelled Light Magic but held off in bringing back the popular Main Street Electrical Parade. However, the parade was refurbished and appeared at Magic Kingdom on May 21, 1999, for a limited engagement, just in time for Walt Disney World Millennium Celebration. The parade ended its run at Magic Kingdom on April 1, 2001, and SpectroMagic was brought back the following day.

Back in Japan, the Tokyo version of the show would return as Tokyo Disneyland Electrical Parade - DreamLights on June 17, 2001, with much larger floats, more than 1 million lights, and a new G-major and orchestral version of Baroque Hoedown arranged by Gregory Smith, replacing the classic A-minor version of the song. This version of the parade gets updated with new units regularly and still performs at Tokyo Disneyland today, aside from a hiatus due to the COVID-19 pandemic.

The Main Street Electrical Parade floats were then sent back to California for the parade's return to Disneyland. These plans changed after Anaheim management saw the poor attendance figures for the spring break season at Disney California Adventure and feared that the park would fail to attract large crowds during the crucial summer season unless they had a big draw. So Disney announced that the popular Main Street Electrical Parade would be coming to Disney California Adventure Park on July 2, 2001, in honor of the park's first summer. The name of the show was changed from the Main Street Electrical Parade to Disney's Electrical Parade, as Disney California Adventure has no Main Street. All of the 1996 parade floats returned, except for the Snow White diamond mine float and the Pinocchio unit, as they were sent to Disneyland Paris in 1997.

During the 2008 Walt Disney World Christmas Day Parade special, Disney announced a new Tinker Bell float would join the parade to replace the Blue Fairy as the parade's leader. This would also mark the first new float in 20 years to be added to the parade. It was also announced in early 2009 that the Snow White diamond mine float and Pinocchio unit would be returning to the California version as well. The parade then held its final performance in its original form on January 5, 2009, and closed for six months as it underwent a massive refurbishment. The parade then returned on June 12, 2009, with the Tinker Bell, Snow White Diamond mine, and Pinocchio units joining the show. The parade also saw an update to the lights, as they were all replaced with LEDs, and the introduction of the G-major version of Baroque Hoedown that was first used in DreamLights in 2001 at Tokyo Disneyland, but less orchestral. This update was done for Disneyland's "Summer Nightastic!" 2009 promotional package.

Disney's Electrical Parade then ended is run at Disney California Adventure on April 18, 2010, and was sent to Magic Kingdom as part of the Walt Disney World 2010 promotional package "Summer Nightastic!" The parade was not modified from its Disney California Adventure run, with the drum still saying "Disney's Electrical Parade", but the name of the parade itself was changed back to The Main Street Electrical Parade. The parade returned to Magic Kingdom on June 5, 2010. While it was initially announced that the parade would run through August 14, 2010, Disney later announced in July 2010 that the parade would stay in Florida for the time being, and that it was on an "open-ended" run.

Six years later, the parade would finally end its run at Magic Kingdom on October 9, 2016, in preparation for a limited-time return to Disneyland Park in California, which was scheduled to run from January 20 to June 18, 2017, before being extended to August 20, 2017. A special ticketed premiere event, costing US$95, occurred on January 19, 2017. Disneyland restored the drum float to once again read "Main Street Electrical Parade" as well as "Disneyland Presents". Tinker Bell's float, added in 2009, was moved back to the Peter Pan unit and was altered for the 2017 run, making Casey Junior the new leader of the parade. On February 24, 2017, the pixie dust swooshes added to the floats in 2009 were removed, except on Tinker Bell's float, since Tinker Bell was no longer the parade's leader. On June 28, 2019, Disney announced that the Main Street Electrical Parade would return to Disneyland for a third run on August 2, 2019, and would run through September 30, 2019. On July 22, 2019, to advertise the parade's new run, the official Disneyland Resort YouTube channel posted a slightly edited version of a commercial from two years prior. The parade ran at Disneyland from August 2 through September 30 for its 2019 seasonal run. On September 28, 2020, one of the spinning snails of the Alice In Wonderland unit made a special live appearance for Tyra Banks' opening entrance for the 2020 Disney Night of Dancing With The Stars.

=== 50th anniversary and beyond ===
One year later, on October 26, 2021, the Disney Parks TikTok released a video teasing the parade's return to Disneyland again, which was confirmed by Disney Parks chairman Josh D'Amaro at Destination D23 on November 20, 2021. A return date for the parade was later announced on February 22, 2022, to be April 22, 2022, and that it would be another limited return engagement in honor of the parade's 50th anniversary. Disney also revealed that the "To Honor America" finale had been redesigned to be more inclusive and now featured dolls from "It's a Small World" that represent movies such as: Brave, Hercules, Mulan, Coco, The Princess and the Frog, Moana, Pocahontas, Frozen, Raya and the Last Dragon, The Jungle Book, Aladdin, and Encanto, as well as the return of the Blue Fairy. The parade soft opened on April 20, 2022, and finished its 50th anniversary limited time run on September 1, 2022. On July 14, 2022, when Disney announced the parade's end date, the Disneyland website updated the parade's info to include “leaving for the season after September 1”, suggesting the parade will likely return again in the future.

On March 3, 2026, two floats from the Alice in Wonderland unit were put on display for photo-ops during the Disneyland After Dark: 70 Years of Favorites event, marking the parade's first public appearance since September 1, 2022. This appearance confirms the parade is awaiting its next outing.

=== Disney Electrical Sky Parade ===
On October 7, 2023, Disneyland Paris announced that a new show called the Disney Electrical Sky Parade would premiere at Disneyland Paris as part of the Disney Symphony of Colours celebration in 2024. The Disney Electrical Sky Parade premiered at Disneyland Paris on January 8, 2024, and was created as a direct tribute to Disneyland Paris' Main Street Electrical Parade. The show used 500 drones, water effects, projections, and pyrotechnics on drones to recreate every unit from the iconic parade in the sky, including the Disneyland version's new "it's a small world" finale from 2022. The show was originally scheduled to end its run on September 30, 2024, but was extended to January 6, 2025. However, it was then extended again by a few days, with the show's final performance held on January 9, 2025.

From October 2 to November 3, 2024, the show was updated for the Halloween season, with the "It's a Small World" finale replaced by a Halloween finale. The Halloween finale pays tribute to Disney villains, including Dr. Facilier from The Princess and the Frog, Mother Gothel from Tangled, Ursula from The Little Mermaid, The Evil Queen from Snow White and the Seven Dwarfs, and Jafar from Aladdin. The finale ends with a tribute to the Disneyland Paris attraction Phantom Manor, including an electronic version of Grim Grinning Ghosts.

From November 9, 2024, to January 6, 2025, the show was updated again, this time for Christmas, with the "it's a small world" finale replaced by a Christmas finale.

== Units ==
=== US versions ===
Over the years and numerous iterations of the parade, the roster of floats has changed. The version of the parade that has appeared in Disneyland, Magic Kingdom, and Disneyland Paris has maintained a continuous set of units. These include The Casey Jr. train from Dumbo carrying Mickey Mouse, Minnie Mouse and Goofy and subsequent floats based on Alice in Wonderland, Cinderella, Peter Pan, Snow White and the Seven Dwarfs, Pinocchio, Pete's Dragon and a patriotic American float titled "To Honor America" (1979–2019). Previous units included the Blue Fairy from Pinocchio, a circus float connected to Dumbo, an "It's a Small World" unit (updated in 2022), a The Fox and the Hound unit, and a promotional float for Return to Oz in 1985, but it was destroyed by a fire. In 2022, the "To Honor America" finale was redesigned to be more inclusive and now featured dolls as seen from "It's a Small World" that represent movies such as Brave, Hercules, Mulan, Coco, The Princess and the Frog, Moana, Pocahontas, Frozen, Raya and the Last Dragon, The Jungle Book, Aladdin and Encanto, as well as the return of the Blue Fairy. The new float also features color changing lights, and the end portion being removed from the rest of the unit to create a new singular float.

=== DreamLights ===
Tokyo Disneyland Electrical Parade: DreamLights features a number of floats featured in the western incarnation, though they are upgraded or alternate models. As of the 2023 renewal, the parade includes The Blue Fairy, Knights of Light, Mickey's Dreamlights Train, Alice in Wonderland, Disney Fairies, Pete's Dragon, Peter Pan, Toy Story, Aladdin, Tangled, Cinderella, Beauty and the Beast, Frozen and "It's a Small World".

Like the 2022 finale in the US version, the finale features films such as Pinocchio, Lilo & Stitch, The Three Caballeros, and The Three Little Pigs.

== Versions ==
There were 4 versions of the parade.

=== Original Disneyland version ===
The original Disneyland parade was built in 1972. This version ran at Disneyland Park (in Anaheim) from June 17, 1972, until 1974. It was replaced by America on Parade for two years.

=== Redesigned Disneyland version ===
In 1977, the floats were redesigned and updated by designer Bob Jani, based on his original 1972 designs, and built by Troy Barrett. The updated version premiered at Disneyland on June 11, 1977. An abridged version of the parade only containing the Alice in Wonderland and Pete's Dragon floats appeared as the halftime show for the 1978 Orange Bowl. It then continued with one more major break during 1982–1985 until November 25, 1996. It then ran through Times Square in New York as the "Hercules Electrical Parade" for one night only on June 14, 1997.

After this, both Pinocchio floats and the Seven Dwarfs Diamond Mine float were sent to Paris. The parade then went on hiatus for two years before being moved to Magic Kingdom (in Orlando), where it lasted from May 21, 1999, until April 1, 2001. After that, it moved to the struggling Disney's California Adventure Park (in Anaheim), where it ran from July 2, 2001, with new Cinderella Court costumes designed by Lisa Marquise, until April 18, 2010. In 2009, the parade's soundtrack was updated to match Tokyo's, while the Dumbo's Circus unit was removed from the parade and the Blue Fairy was replaced with a new TinkerBell float. When it ended there, it moved back to the Magic Kingdom (in Orlando), where it lasted from June 5, 2010, until October 9, 2016

It then left Magic Kingdom (in Orlando) to move back to its home park, Disneyland (in Anaheim), where it ran from January 19, 2017 until August 20 of the same year. Disney later announced on June 28, 2019, that it would return to Disneyland for a third run which began on August 2, 2019, and ended on September 30, 2019. One year later, one of the spinning snails from the Alice in Wonderland unit made a live TV appearance on Dancing with the Stars on September 28, 2020, confirming the parade was on another hiatus.

A year later on October 26, 2021, the Disney Parks TikTok released a video teasing the parade's return yet again, with the same snail being loaded onto a truck bound for Disneyland. The parade returned again for its 50th anniversary on April 20, 2022, and ran until September 1, 2022. Also for its 2022 return, Disney revealed that the "To Honor America" finale float had been redesigned to be more inclusive and now featured dolls from "it's a small world" that represent movies such as Brave, Hercules, Mulan, Coco, The Princess and the Frog, Moana, Pocahontas, Frozen, Raya and the Last Dragon, The Jungle Book, Aladdin, and Encanto, as well as the return of the Blue Fairy. The new float also features color changing lights, and the end portion of the unit being removed from the rest of the unit to create a new singular float. The opening logo unit also saw an update to the parade's logo similar to the text used at DCA and the 2010–2016 run at Walt Disney World, as well as a 50th anniversary logo for the 2022 return. A new inclusive opening fanfare that honor's the parade's legacy and Walt Disney's dedication of Disneyland in 1955 was also introduced for the 2022 return.

=== Walt Disney World and Disneyland Paris version ===
The Walt Disney World version was built in 1977 and premiered in Magic Kingdom (in Orlando) on June 11, 1977. It was a clone of the one that was running in Anaheim, with slightly wider floats due to Magic Kingdom's wider parade route.

It ran there until September 14, 1991, but actually had one last performance on September 30, 1991, during a private media event. It was then moved across the Atlantic to Disneyland Park (Paris). The Swans from Tokyo Disneyland was added in 1997, whilst the Snow White and the Pinocchio units from Disneyland were added in 1998. It lasted from April 12, 1992, up until March 23, 2003, where it was sent to Hong Kong Disneyland, but never appeared there. The Snow White and the Pinocchio units were sent back to Disneyland in 2009.

A spin-off tribute of the parade called the Disney Electrical Sky Parade was announced on October 7, 2023, and premiered on January 8, 2024, as part of the Disney Symphony of Colours celebration. This new show recreates the iconic parade in the sky by using hundreds of drones, water effects, projections, and pyrotechnics on drones to recreate every unit from the parade in the sky, including the redesigned Disneyland version's new "It's a Small World" finale from 2022. A Halloween version of the show ran from October 2 to November 3, 2024, followed by a Christmas version that ran from November 9, 2024, to January 6, 2025. The show was originally scheduled to end its run on September 30, 2024, but was extended and ended its run on January 9, 2025.

=== Tokyo Disneyland/DreamLights version ===
The Tokyo Disneyland version was built in 1985. It premiered on March 9, 1985, and closed on June 21, 1995. When it closed, it was refurbished into Tokyo Disneyland Electrical Parade: DreamLights. DreamLights premiered at Tokyo Disneyland on June 17, 2001.

In 1997, the Swan Lake unit was sent to Disneyland Paris.

This version of the parade went on an unscheduled hiatus from February 28, 2020, to October 31, 2021, due to the COVID-19 pandemic. The parade returned on November 1, 2021, with physical dancers removed and some characters omitted due to Japan's physical distancing guidelines, as well as a new inclusive opening fanfare.

In 2023, all physical dancers and characters that were removed returned and the new floats as part of the Disney 100 Years Of Wonder and the 40th Dream-Go-Round celebrations.

== Music ==
The Main Street Electrical Parade's underlying theme song is entitled "Baroque Hoedown." The original version was created in 1967 by early synthesizer pioneers Jean-Jacques Perrey and Gershon Kingsley and appeared first on the album Kaleidoscopic Vibrations: Electronic Pop Music from Way Out. Originally, the parade's soundtrack had the same themes as the current recording, but was a different arrangement by Jim Christensen and Paul Beaver. In 1977, it was updated and arranged by electronic music artist Don Dorsey and Jack Wagner at Jack Wagner Studio, which was used until January 5, 2009, in Disney's Electrical Parade.

When the parade returned to Disney California Adventure on June 12, 2009, it began using the updated, orchestrated DreamLights soundtrack from Tokyo, but with changes made as certain floats in the California parade are not included in the Tokyo parade. The soundtrack for the current version, the 2009 version of Disney's Electrical Parade, The Main Street Electrical Parade (the last run ending in 2016 at Magic Kingdom), and the 2017, 2019 and 2022 runs of the Main Street Electrical Parade at Disneyland, as well as Tokyo Disneyland Electrical Parade DreamLights version were arranged, programmed and performed by Gregory Smith. Smith also arranged the music for Disneyland's Remember... Dreams Come True show (which also contains a snippet of the original Don Dorsey arrangement, which then concludes in a grand orchestral finale arranged by Smith) as well as Magical: Disney's New Nighttime Spectacular of Magical Celebrations fireworks shows.

The soundtrack to the parade has been released numerous times:

- Main Street Electrical Parade (1973 soundtrack) (Disneyland Park, Disneyland Resort)
- Main Street Electrical Parade (1977 soundtrack) (Disneyland and Magic Kingdom)
- The Music of Disney: A Legacy in Song (1992) (Disneyland Park, Disneyland Resort)
- Fantasmic!: Good Clashes with Evil in a Nighttime Spectacular (1992) (Disneyland Park, Disneyland Resort)
- Classic Disney Volume II: 60 Years of Musical Magic (1995) (Disneyland Park, Disneyland Resort)
- The Main Street Electrical Parade (1999 CD) (Magic Kingdom, Walt Disney World)
- Les Parades En Musique (2000 CD) (Disneyland Park, Disneyland Resort Paris)
- Disney's Electrical Parade (2001 CD)
- Tokyo Disneyland Electrical Parade Dreamlights (2001 CD)
- Tokyo Disneyland Electrical Parade Dreamlights - Show Mix Edition (2001)
- Tokyo Disneyland Electrical Parade Dreamlights (2011 Renewal Version)
- A Musical History of Disneyland (Disneyland Park, Disneyland Resort)
- Walt Disney Records The Legacy Collection: Disneyland (2015)
- Tokyo Disneyland Electrical Parade Dreamlights ~2017 Renewal Version~ (2017)
- Tokyo Disneyland Electrical Parade Dreamlights ~2023 Renewal Version~ (2023)

Dorsey used 11 synthesizers to create the soundtrack: Moog Model III, Minimoog, Steiner-Parker Synthacon, Oberheim Eight Voice, Sequential Circuits Prophet-5, Fender Rhodes Piano, New England Digital Synclavier II, Bode 7702 Vocoder, Roland MKS-80 Super Jupiter, Yamaha DX7 and Yamaha TX7.

Starting in 1979, Wagner provides the synthesized vocoder voice for the intro and outro to the parade. Bill Rogers provided the synthesized vocoder announcement for the Disneyland version of the parade beginning in 2022. When the parade went to Disney California Adventure Park in 2001, the original Jack Wagner announcements for the Disneyland version of the parade were used as the basis for the announcements at the new park. Since the park does not have a Main Street (at that time), the announcements had to be updated with minor changes. These included the insertion of the words "Disney" and "Disney's" to reflect that the show's name had changed to Disney's Electrical Parade. When the soundtrack was updated, the announcements were pitch-corrected, but were still based on the original Jack Wagner announcements from Disneyland.

While the original soundtrack is played solely on synthesizers, the Tokyo Disneyland version uses an orchestra with adult and youth choirs in addition to harmonies and synthesizers. This version also includes Character voices in both English and Japanese. This version was also orchestrated, programmed, conducted and performed by Gregory Smith. During the Christmas season at Tokyo Disneyland, the Electrical Parade gets a new soundtrack; it is mostly the same soundtrack with added Christmas songs, mixed in with the theme music. For Tokyo Disneyland's 30th anniversary, a show stop was added to the parade, it includes a 2-minute Christmas melody; fireworks from Cinderella Castle are synced during the show stop as well. The showstop is only performed once a year as part of a private event for Disney/JCB Card holders. The last time this version did a holiday overlay was in 2019–2020. During the 2021 reopening, they opted out on the holiday overlay due to the COVID-19 pandemic. It has yet to be revealed if they would do the overlay again unless someone should ask them about. In 2023, the Holiday Overlay returned, to its full glory.

The 2009 version of Disney's Electrical Parade at Disney's California Adventure, its 2010 run at Magic Kingdom and its 2017, 2019 and 2022 runs at Disneyland utilize much of the soundtrack created for DreamLights, with new loops created for the Cinderella, Pinocchio, To Honor America (2009–2019), and "it's a small world" units. However, the new soundtrack retains a more electronic sound than that of Tokyo's in that many of the orchestral parts of the DreamLights soundtrack have been replaced by synthesizers in this version. Whereas the Magic Kingdom used a newly recorded vocoder introduction for its 2010 version of the parade, the original 1977 Jack Wagner introduction was pitch-corrected to match the updated soundtrack and integrated into Disneyland's 2017 and 2019 versions of the parade. A new inclusive introduction that was both non-vocoded and vocoded was integrated in 2022 for its 50th anniversary at Disneyland by Bill Rogers. The vocoded part of the 2022 intro is expected to be the new, permanent introduction of the parade should it ever return following its 50th anniversary run.

The soundtrack for the Disneyland Paris “Disney Electrical Sky Parade” (credited by show director, Mabrouk Reguigui) was produced, arranged, and scored by American music producer and Disney composer, Rick McKee. This soundtrack tributes the original Paris version with a fresh overlay of modern production and classic scoring. The score also features themes from Aladdin, Brave, The Princess and the Frog, Coco, Moana, Mulan, Encanto, Raya and the Last Dragon, Hercules, and Toy Story. Various themes from the classic films were added as well—notably, McKee's inclusion of “Candle on the Water” during the Pete's Dragon drone unit.

== See also ==
- Magic Kingdom attraction and entertainment history
- Tokyo Disneyland Electrical Parade Dreamlights ~Christmas~ - the special holiday version made for Dreamlights.
