= Disney on Parade (stage show) =

Series of touring arena stage shows

- Product type: Arena stage shows
- Produced by: NAWAL Productions
- Country: United States
- Introduced: December 25, 1969; 56 years ago
- Discontinued: 1976

Disney on Parade was a series of touring arena stage shows produced by a joint venture between NBC and Walt Disney Productions, through their subsidiary Nawal Productions. Aimed primarily at children and families, the shows featured live performers portraying the roles of Disney characters in performances derived from various Disney films.

== History ==
The initial concept for the production was conceived by Thomas Sarnoff and presented to his brother, Robert Sarnoff. The elder Sarnoff had served as the President of National Broadcasting Company (NBC) and CEO of Radio Corporation of America (RCA). NBC at the time aired The Wonderful World of Disney weekly anthology television series. To produce the show, Walt Disney Productions teamed with the network to create Nawal Productions, with NBC being the general partner and Disney the limited partner.

Following a trial run in Long Beach, California, the first edition of Disney on Parade launched at Chicago Stadium in Chicago, Illinois on December 25, 1969, and was an instant success. However, the show suffered from an overabundance of props, inexperienced performers, high costs and a run time of nearly three hours, so NBC replaced producer Bob Jani with Michel M. Grilikhes, who made effective changes, including rearranging or removing acts, to reduce costs and time without affecting the show's quality. Grilikhes, affectionately known to the cast and crew as "Mr. G", would executive-produce and direct further editions of Disney on Parade.

Four editions of Disney on Parade, each with a different set of acts, would tour across the United States and around the world, including runs in South America, Europe, Asia and Australia; one of the Aussie first edition performances (promoted by Edgley International and TVW) at Bonython Park in Adelaide, Australia was videotaped in September 1971, and broadcast as a one-hour special on NBC's The Wonderful World of Disney three months later on December 19, 1971. The special reran on NBC on July 2, 1972.

Despite the videotaped performance being successful without any issues, Adelaide's run of Disney on Parade at Bonython Park that year later received a small amount of incidents throughout its run. One of its runs in Bonython on October 9 went into a halt after a large flying rig, a hexagon spinning wheel with six female aerialists (dressed as butterflies with large wings attached to their backs) hooked on strings inside collapsed and fell 30 feet to a platform after a safety chain snapped. All six of the performers were from Perth, with three of the aerialists suffered major injuries, while the other three suffered both minor pelvic and spinal injuries.

By 1976, the shows ceased performing internationally.

== Format ==
Each edition of Disney on Parade typically began with Mickey Mouse and a cavalcade of Disney characters dancing on the stage and personally greeting members of the audience. The show would then present lavish musical segments, depicting characters and scenes from Disney films, alongside smaller comedy routines with characters like Donald Duck, Goofy and Herbie the Love Bug. Finally, the characters appeared together for a grand finale and bid the audience farewell. Each show was divided into two acts with one 15-minute intermission.

The arena stages typically sported a giant curtain, from which characters and sets would emerge, and a circular motion picture screen that would present clips from Disney features and shorts at the beginning of major acts.

== Reception ==
Disney on Parade was well received by audiences and critics. The first edition's run at Madison Square Garden made a record $400,000 in advanced ticket sales. In other cities, many arenas set records on fastest-growing attendees. The first edition's run at the Los Angeles Memorial Sports Arena booked 200,000 people in its first 18 days of its run. In Cincinnati, Ohio, the first edition's run at the Cincinnati Gardens booked 81,702 people in its first five days of its run, and a 1971 run at the Salt Palace in Salt Lake City, Utah booked 77,255 people in nine days, in which around 38% of the city's then-population of 175,885. It later toured Europe, Australia, Asia and Latin America, making $64 million worldwide.
