= Disney Starlight: Dream the Night Away =

Parade at Disney theme parks

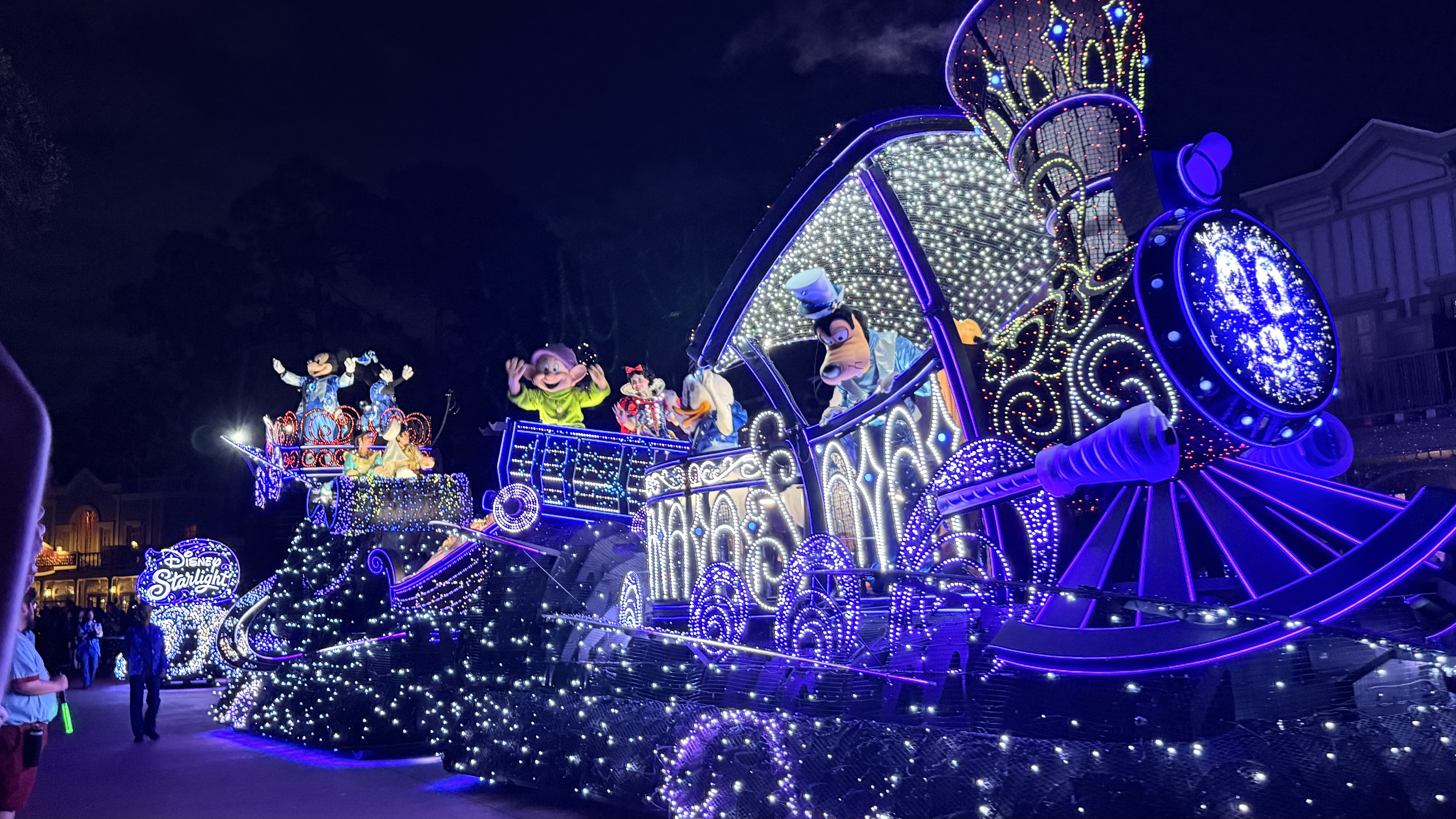
- "Whimsy", the penultimate float of the parade, featuring Mickey and Friends.

Magic Kingdom
- Status: Operating
- Soft opening date: July 18, 2025
- Opening date: July 20, 2025
- Replaced: SpectroMagic; Main Street Electrical Parade

Ride statistics
- Attraction type: Parade
- Music: Jedha & Tim Heinz & Various Walt Disney Animation Studios and Pixar Soundtracks
- Wheelchair accessible

Disney Starlight: Dream the Night Away is a nighttime parade at Magic Kingdom at Walt Disney World in Bay Lake, Florida. The parade is the first nighttime at the Magic Kingdom since the Main Street Electrical Parade had its last performance on October 9, 2016. The parade soft opened with a performance on July 18, 2025, and officially opened on July 20, 2025.

The parade pays homage to the park's previous nighttime parades, the aforementioned Main Street Electrical Parade and SpectroMagic. It starts at the gates near Tiana’s Bayou Adventure in Frontierland every night, excluding special event nights.

== Development ==
On August 11, 2024, it was announced at the D23 Expo in Anaheim, California that the Magic Kingdom at the Walt Disney World Resort would receive a brand new nighttime parade in the summer of 2025.

On May 27, 2025, Disney announced the parade would debut on July 20, 2025.

The parade debuted with soft openings on July 18 and 19, before officially debuting on July 20.

This is the first time the park has had a daily night parade since the departure of the Main Street Electrical Parade in 2016, and the first new night parade at Magic Kingdom since the debut SpectroMagic in 1991.

=== Units ===
- Blue Fairy, featuring Pinocchio and Geppetto
- Wish, featuring Asha, Valentino, and Star
- Encanto, featuring Mirabel Madrigal, Isabela Madrigal and Bruno Madrigal
- Frozen, based on the 2019 animated movie, Frozen 2, featuring Elsa
- The Royal Court, featuring the Disney Princesses and their respective Princes, with Cinderella and Prince Charming, Princess Tiana and Prince Naveen, Belle and Beast, and Aurora and Prince Phillip
- Coco, featuring Miguel, Dante and Pepita
- Moana, featuring, Pua and Gramma Tala (in her manta ray form)
- Peter Pan, featuring Tinker Bell, Wendy Darling and Peter Pan
- Whimsy, the finale float, featuring Goofy, Pluto, Donald and Daisy Duck, Snow White, Dopey, Rapunzel, Flynn Rider, Aladdin, Jasmine, and Mickey and Minnie Mouse.
- Disney Starlight title float, featuring an animation of Jiminy Cricket from Pinocchio, in a tributary nod to SpectroMagic.

== Soundtrack ==
On July 25, 2025, Walt Disney Records released the complete soundtrack on all streaming platforms. The musical score for the parade was composed by Jedha and Tim Heintz, and it features a tracklist of 15 songs from the designated floats of the parade, including the opening and closing fanfares.
