= Light Magic =

1997 nighttime show at Disneyland

Disneyland
- Area: Fantasyland and Main Street, USA
- Status: Closed
- Cost: US$20 million
- Soft opening date: May 13, 1997
- Opening date: May 23, 1997
- Closing date: September 1, 1997
- Replaced: Main Street Electrical Parade
- Replaced by: Mulan Parade; Paint the Night

Ride statistics
- Designer: Walt Disney Imagineering
- Duration: 20 minutes

Light Magic was a nighttime parade/street show that ran at Disneyland in 1997 from May–September. It was billed as a replacement for the Main Street Electrical Parade. At the time of its closure, Disney officially stated that it would return in 2000, but it ultimately did not return. Infrastructure improvements made specifically for Light Magic – particularly in Fantasyland – are still used today. The show utilized over 4500 miles of fiber optic cables and 1520 strobe lights.

== Synopsis ==
Light Magic was a "streetacular" (a portmanteau of "street" and "spectacular"). Floats moved into two performance zones, one at the Small World Mall in Fantasyland, and the other on Main Street. On reaching the performance zones, the floats stopped and the pixie characters, who were the focus of the show, awakened and performed step-dancing routines for the audience, and were then joined by Disney characters. During the performance segment, a portion of each of the floats revealed a screen upon which images were projected from equipment hidden in the surrounding buildings. As part of the grand finale, the fairies used their 'magic' to throw pixie dust, confetti fell from the sky, and the surrounding buildings lit up with showers of twinkling lights provided by embedded fiber optics.

Light Magic's music was Celtic-influenced. The songs in the show were:

- "Dream Our Dream", the Light Magic Theme
- "Little April Shower" (instrumental) from Bambi
- "Be Our Guest" (instrumental) from Beauty and the Beast
- "Topsy Turvy" (instrumental) from The Hunchback of Notre Dame
- "Step in Time" (instrumental) from Mary Poppins
- "When You Wish upon a Star" from Pinocchio
- "A Dream Is a Wish Your Heart Makes" (instrumental) from Cinderella
- "Part of Your World" (instrumental) from The Little Mermaid
- "Beauty and the Beast" (instrumental) from Beauty and the Beast
- "Baroque Hoedown" from the Main Street Electrical Parade

== Reception ==
=== Annual Passholder premiere ===
Light Magic debuted on the night of May 13, 1997 at a private event for Disneyland Annual Passholders. Prior to the show, then-Disneyland President Paul Pressler announced to the attendees that it would be a "dress rehearsal", not the show in its finished form. During the performance, technical problems occurred aligning the floats with the projectors, cues were missed, sound equipment failed, and fiber-optic effects were not yet functional.

Having believed they would be the first to see the complete new show, disappointed passholders formed long lines at Guest Relations in Main Street's City Hall, demanding refunds for the $25 they had paid to attend.

=== Public response ===
Light Magic debuted to the general public on May 23, 1997 and played until September 1 of that year, with the majority of the response from the public ranging from lackluster to dislike.

== Legacy ==
Much of the infrastructure built for Light Magic – especially in the Fantasyland area – is still used today for Disneyland's parades. These improvements included:

- Painted asphalt along the parade route replaced with concrete to accommodate the large, heavy show platforms
- The plaza area in front of It's a Small World widened and terraced to allow guests better views of the parade route.
- A walkway added parallel to the parade route between Storybook Land Canal Boats and It's A Small World – landscaped to block the view of the parade route from the walkway – allowing guests to pass through the It's A Small World area during parades (added during the final months of the Main Street Electrical Parade)
- Lighting towers (themed to the small world facade) added to Small World Mall and atop the Main Street, USA buildings, allowing the same parade to be run in the afternoon and in the evening (rather than requiring an illuminated evening parade such as the Main Street Electrical Parade)

Three sound and lighting towers (also themed to the small world facade) added to Small World Mall still stand. Two currently have no explicit purpose, but their exterior facades are maintained and decorated for the holidays. The closest tower to the facade is used as a projection tower for the park's fireworks shows and for projection shows on the It's a Small World facade.

On March 17 (St. Patrick's Day), 2013, Light Magic's music was used during Disneyland Paris' Saint Patrick's Day Fireworks.

Since Light Magic's closure, Disneyland had no nighttime parade for 18 years until the Paint the Night Parade (also featuring the "Baroque Hoedown" soundtrack) premiered on May 22, 2015 as part of the park's 60th Anniversary celebration.

== Soundtrack ==
Baroque Hoedown was incorporated into the finale of Light Magic.

A partial soundtrack for the show can be found on:

- Disneyland/Walt Disney World Music Vacation
- Disneyland/Walt Disney World: The Official Album (1997 CD)

The Light Magic theme song "Dream Our Dream" was later used in 2002 in a show called "Minnie's Birthday Surprise" at Videopolis theater in the Disneyland Park in Paris.

=== Production ===
- Produced by Bruce Healey
- Engineered and Mixed by Paul Freeman
- Announcer: Randy Crenshaw
- Dream Our Dreams Opening Play On (Vocals by Ellis Hall)
- Dream Our Dreams (Vocals by Richard Page)
