= Tokyo Disneyland Electrical Parade Dreamlights ~Christmas~ =

Tokyo Disneyland Electrical Parade: Dreamlights ~Christmas~

Soundtrack album by Tokyo Disneyland
- Released: 2007 & 2011
- Recorded: 2007 & 2011
- Genre: Disney, Christmas
- Length: 26:10
- Label: Walt Disney Records
- Producer: Steve Skorija

Tokyo Disneyland Electrical Parade Dreamlights ~Christmas~ is the Christmas version of the Tokyo Disneyland Electrical Parade Dreamlights. It opened in 2007 and runs during the holidays. The parade includes the regular floats and characters dressed up for the holidays. The soundtrack is almost identical to the regular, but has a holiday theme.

For Tokyo Disneyland's 30th anniversary, a show stop was added to the parade, it includes a 2-minute Christmas melody; fireworks from Cinderella Castle are synced during the show stop as well. The showstop is only performed once a year as part of a private event for Disney/JCB Card holders.

== Song index ==
1. Tokyo Disneyland Electrical Parade Dreamlights ~Christmas~
- OPENING WINDOW & ANNOUNCEMENT (Fanfare of Lights (Don Dorsey)): "Ladies and gentlemen, boys and girls! (Until 2020) Good evening and welcome, one and all! Tokyo Disneyland proudly presents our most spectacular pageant of nighttime dreams and fantasy. In millions of sparkling lights, and brilliant musical sounds: Tokyo Disneyland Electrical Parade: DreamLights!"
- Blue Fairy, Knights of Light, and Mickey's Dreamlights Train- Mickey Mouse, Minnie Mouse, & Santa Goofy
  - Baroque Hoedown (Perrey/Kingsley)
  - Jingle Bells (James Lord Pierpont)
  - Deck the Hall (Traditional)
- Alice in Wonderland (1951 film)- Alice, Chester Cat, Snails, Centipede
  - All in the Golden Afternoon (Fain/Hillard)
  - The Caucus Race (Fain/Hillard)
  - In a world of My Own (Fain/Hillard)
  - ‘Twas Brilling (Raye/L. Carol/De Paul)
  - The Unbirthday Song (David/Livingston/Hoffman)
  - Up on the Housetop (Traditional)
  - Sleigh Ride (Parish/L. Anderson)
- Pete's Dragon- Elliot the Dragon, Pete
  - Brazzle Dazzle Day (Kasha/Hirschhorn)
  - It's Not Easy (Kasha/Hirschhorn)
  - Jingle Bells (Pierpont)
  - Joy to the World (Traditional)
  - O Come All Ye Faithful (Traditional)
- Snow White and the Seven Dwarfs (1937 film) (Retired 2017)
  - The Beautiful Snow White
    - With a Smile and a Song (Churchill/Morey)
    - Joy to the World (Traditional)
    - "White Christmas" (song) (I.Berlin)
    - I'm Wishing (Churchill/Morey)
- Peter Pan (1953 film)- Peter, Wendy, Hook, Smee
  - Peter Pan Suite
  - Deck the halls
  - 12 days of Christmas
- Aladdin (1992 film)
  - Genie
    - Friend Like Me (Ashman/Menken)
    - Aloha Oe (Lil'uokalani Queen)
    - When You Wish Upon a Star (Harline/Washington)
    - March of the Cards (Fain)
    - Never Smile at a Crocodile (Churchill/Lawrence)
    - Nemo Egg (T. Newman)
    - Jingle Bells (Pierpont)
  - Aladdin and Jasmine
    - Arabian Nights (Ashman/Menken)
    - Prince Ali (Ashman/Menken)
    - Jingle Bells (Pierpont)
    - Rudolph, the red nosed reindeer
    - Deck the Halls
- Tangled (2010 film)
  - Rapunzel and Eugene Flynn Rider
    - Healing Incantation (Alan Menken)
    - I see the light (Alan Menken)
    - Joy to the World (Georg Friedrich Handel P.D.)
    - We Wish you a Merry Christmas (Traditional) (2015-2017)
    - Jingle Bells (traditional) (2017- present)
- Toy Story 3
  - We Belong Together (R.Newman)
  - You've Got a Friend in Me (R.Newman)
  - The Parade of the Tin Soldiers (L.Jessel)
  - Deck the Halls
  - Hark the herald angels sing
- Finding Nemo – Nemo and Crush (Retired 2017)
  - Beyond the Sea (Larsy/C.L.Trenet/Lawrence)
  - It's the Most Wonderful Time of the Year (Pola/Wyle)
- Monsters, Inc. (retired 2017)
  - If I Didn't Have You (Newman)
  - Here Comes Santa Claus (Down Santa Claus Lane) (Autry/Haldeman)
- Cinderella (1950 film)
  - Cinderella
    - Bibbidi Bobbibidi Boo (David/Livingston/Hoffman)
    - Deck the halls
    - 12 days of Christmas
    - A dream is a wish your heart makes
    - We Wish You a Merry Christmas (Traditional)
    - Cinderella (David/Livingston/Hoffman)
  - Cinderella's Ball
    - Royal ball intro
    - So this is love
    - all come ye faithful
    - Rudolph, the red nosed reindeer
    - We Wish You a Merry Christmas (Traditional)
    - dream is a wish your heart makes
- Beauty and the Beast (2017 film)
  - Lumiere
    - Be our guest
    - As Long as There's Christmas
    - Prologue
  - Ballroom
    - Beauty and the Beast (Disney song)
    - As Long as There's Christmas
    - Prologue
- Frozen
  - For The First Time in Forever
  - Do You want to Build a Snowman
  - We Wish You a Merry Christmas
- Tinkerbell
  - Fly to Your Heart (M. tumes)
  - To the Fairies They Draw Near (L.Mckennitt)
  - We Wish You a Merry Christmas (Traditional) (2011-2017)
  - Winter Wonderland (2017-present)
  - Hark the Herald Angels Sing
- It's a Small World / “Finale”- Various Disney Characters
  - It's a Small World Holiday (3rd and 4th verses)
- Unisys Sponsor Unit & Closing Window
  - Jingle Bells (Pierpont)
  - DreamLights Theme Variation (Greg Smith)
- Closing Announcement (Electric Fanfare (Don Dorsey)): “Tokyo Disneyland Electrical Parade Dreamlights!”

== Credits and Production ==
- Executive Producer/ Music Director- Steve Skorija
- Arranging/ Composition- Greg Smith
- Recorded and Mixed by John Richards
- Pro Tools Music Editor- Michael Atwell
- Recorded by The Czech Film Orchestra
- Music Supervision- Savant Productions
- Music Preparation- Express Music Services
- Mixed at Skywalker Sounds
- Executive Producer- Etsuko Nagashima
- Managing Producer- Satoshi Hayashi
- Creative Director- Kazuhiro Watarumi
- Producer- Kay Okuno
- Show Director- Michi Ariga
- Music Director- Tsutomu Takeuchi
- Recording and Mixing Engineer- Atsushi Kobayashi

== Character voices ==
Like its counterpart Tokyo Disneyland Electrical Parade Dreamlights ~Christmas~ is in both English and Japanese.

- Rosalyn Landor as the Blue Fairy
- Takashi Aoyagi as Mickey Mouse
- Yū Shimaka as Goofy and Genie
- Yūko Mizutani as Minnie Mouse
- Kat Cressida as Alice and Wendy Darling
- Blayne Weaver as Peter Pan
- Corey Burton as Captain Hook and Mr. Smee
- Sean Marshall as Pete
- Carolyn Gardner as Snow White
- Toshiaki Karasawa as Woody
- Yumi Kusaka as Jessie
- George Tokoro as Buzz Lightyear
- Hidehiko Ishizuka as Sulley
- Yūji Tanaka as Mike Wazowski
- Airi Inoue as Boo
- Keita Miyatani as Nemo
- Rikiya Koyama as Crush
- Hisako Kyōda as Fairy Godmother
- Mae Whitman as Tinker Bell
- Scott Weinger as Aladdin
- Linda Larkin as Princess Jasmine
- Mandy Moore as Rapunzel
- Zachary Levi as Flynn Rider
- Melissa Atwell as Announcer
