= Baroque Hoedown =

Song by Perrey and Kingsley

from the album Kaleidoscopic Vibrations
- Released: 1967
- Genre: Electronic

Kaleidoscopic Vibrations chronology
"Fallout"	"Baroque Hoedown"	"Winchester Cathedral"

"Baroque Hoedown" is an instrumental by the duet Perrey and Kingsley (formed by the French Jean-Jacques Perrey and the German-American Gershon Kingsley). Original from 1967 album Kaleidoscopic Vibrations a follow-up to their previous 1966 album, The In Sound From Way Out!. The two albums were reissued in 1988 on a compilation album titled The Essential Perrey and Kingsley.

== Recording ==
The Moog synthesizer went on sale in 1967 and the duet Perrey and Kingsley became the first to make recordings with the Moog synthesizer, predating 1968 album Switched-On Bach by Wendy Carlos that popularized the Moog synthesizer.

== The Main Street Electrical Parade ==
Disneyland's vice president of entertainment Bob Jani had considered using the symphonic music from the movie Fantasia as the background music for the parade, but producer Jack Wagner felt the music should be electronic rather than orchestral. Wagner during his search for the theme to be used in the Main Street Electrical Parade, decided to listen to Perrey and Kingsley's "Kaleidoscopic Vibrations" (1967), and after a while he came across "Baroque Hoedown", which was chosen due to its ideal tempo for the parade choreography The Electrical Parade was originally created for Disneyland, debuting on June 17, 1972, and running there until November 25, 1996. During all that time, Perrey did not find out about the use of "Baroque Hoedown" until 1980:

In the 1970s, Walt Disney Productions chose this tune to be the theme for the Electrical Parade. It was extraordinary, I didn't know about it because the publishers said nothing to me. It was by chance, in 1980, that I went there and was so surprised to hear "Baroque Hoedown" arranged for a full orchestra.

— Jean-Jacques Perrey

An arrangement of the piece in the style of Vivaldi was recorded by the Los Angeles Guitar Quartet for the 1995 album Heigh-Ho! Mozart.

== See also ==
- Main Street Electrical Parade
- Perrey and Kingsley
