= Jack Wagner (announcer) =

American radio personality and announcer (1925–1995)

- Born: Jack Francis Wagner; October 17, 1925; Los Angeles, California, United States
- Died: June 16, 1995 (aged 69); Riverside, California, United States
- Resting place: Forest Lawn Memorial Park, Hollywood Hills
- Occupations: Actor; announcer
- Years active: c. 1930–1991
- Known for: Disneyland and Walt Disney World announcements

Jack Francis Wagner (October 17, 1925 – June 16, 1995) was an American radio personality and actor best known for his association with Disneyland. He is famous for the various announcements over the park PA, for parades, special events, etc. He also did voice work for Walt Disney World, and for the attractions themselves, including instructions, emergency precautions, and safety spiels. Because of the prevalence of his voice over the park, his nickname was "The Voice of Disneyland".

One of his most famous lines is from a safety spiel at the Matterhorn Bobsleds attraction, spoken in English and Spanish: "Remain seated please; permanecer sentados por favor." This line is reprised in the nostalgic fireworks show "Remember... Dreams Come True", and is also a line in the film Toy Story 2 (said by Barbie, who was voiced by Jodi Benson), as well as the episode "Rollercoaster: The Musical!" in the Phineas and Ferb Disney animated series. The original recording can also be heard in the opening seconds of Anaheim ska punk band No Doubt's "Tragic Kingdom", a song from the album of the same name. A similarly famous announcement is the message signaling that the Walt Disney World Monorail's doors are closing. This spiel is as follows: "Please stand clear of the doors. Por favor manténgase alejado de las puertas." He also did the vocoder voice for the Main Street Electrical Parade albeit, pitch down in 2017 and then was retired completely in 2022.

Wagner also enjoyed a lengthy career as a radio announcer at KHJ (AM) and KNX in Los Angeles, and as a television actor, his best-known role being that of the malt-shop proprietor in The Adventures of Ozzie and Harriet. He was the younger brother of noted choral director Roger Wagner. Wagner's son Mike, a former disc jockey and radio programmer, is a Disney executive.

Wagner was forced to retire in 1991 following throat surgery, but occasionally still did voice work and brief announcements for Disney. Four years later, he died at age 69 after collapsing at a rest stop in Riverside, California, while on his way to Palm Springs on June 16, 1995.
