= Andrea Elizabeth Michaels =

Yugoslavian-born American meeting and event producer

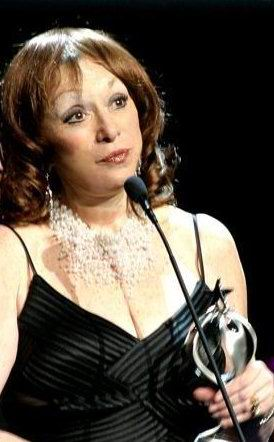
- Andrea Michaels at the Special Event Convention in 2005.
- Born: Andrea Elizabeth Gerson; Rab concentration camp, occupied Yugoslavia (now Croatia)
- Education: University of California at Los Angeles
- Occupations: Event producer, business owner, author and speaker
- Organization: Extraordinary Events
- Website: www.extraordinaryevents.net

Andrea Elizabeth Michaels (née Gerson) is an American meeting and event producer, author and speaker. As founder of an international event production company, Extraordinary Events, Michaels and her company produce large corporate events. She is an original member of the special events industry Hall of Fame and the author of a business biography, and is featured in three anthologies.

== Early life ==
Andrea Michaels was born in the Arbe concentration camp (today Rab, Croatia, on the northern shore of the Adriatic Sea) to Lelja Kauders (b. Zagreb, Yugoslavia, August 25, 1923 – d. Los Angeles California, May 30, 2009). Michaels and her mother, along with her mother's Jewish parents, Paul (Palvo) Kauders and Elza Ackerman Kauders, escaped in a small boat across the Adriatic to Italy. Michaels lived in Italy to the age of four with her grandparents until her mother, who had married an American pilot, sent for her to come live in America. The marriage ended, and after Michaels arrived in America, her mother married Peter Gerson, who adopted Andrea and moved the family from Silverlake, California, to Hollywood. When Michaels was ten, the family moved to Burbank, California.

An only child Michaels graduated from Burbank High School in 1961. Michaels attended the University of California at Berkeley in 1961 and 1962, transferring to the University of California at Los Angeles (UCLA) before marrying Bob Spritz on February 1, 1964. The marriage lasted ten years, and they had a son, Jon (b. July 24, 1970). After her divorce from Spritz, she changed her last name as well as that of her son's to "Michaels." Michaels returned to UCLA in 1970 and earned a degree, with honors, in Psychology.

== Early career ==
Instead of pursuing a career in Psychology, Michaels began working with the Ron Rubin Orchestras in 1973. During that time, she became interested in the event planning business when there was no formalized industry. She produced her first event in 1978—-a bicentennial celebration for Marsh McClellan Insurance Company. By 1982, the company had been restructured and renamed Michaels, Rubin and Associates. Michaels and Rubin dissolved their relationship in December 1988, and on that same day, Extraordinary Events was launched. At that time, Michaels began to bring to the corporate world the spectaculars that had been produced on football fields, Disneyland and in entertainment venues by the late Tommy Walker and the late Robert (Bob) Jani.

== Later career ==
Extraordinary Events has specialized in planning and producing corporate events globally including Europe, Asia, Canada, Mexico, the Caribbean, Africa, Australia and New Zealand. In 2006, Special Events magazine listed Extraordinary Events as one of the "Top 50 Event Planning Companies." The Los Angeles Business Journal named it Number 28 on its list of the "Fastest Growing Private Companies" in 2006, jumping from Number 80 in 2005 and then to Number 48 in 2005 and then to Number 48 in 2007.

Michaels and her company began to incorporate charitable activities into its events with the rebuilding of an elementary school in Leona Vicario, Mexico, with client CEMEX, a concrete manufacturer, in 2005. The Los Angeles Business Journal and Financial and Insurance Meetings magazine covered the event.

Michaels and Extraordinary Events have won the following awards:

- 34 Special Events magazine Gala Awards
- 2 Special Events magazine Gala Awards of Excellence
- 2 WOW Awards
- 1 Meeting Planners International Paragon Award
- 2 Society of Incentive and Travel Executives Crystal Awards
- 3 EIBTM Awards
- 1 Successful Meetings Super Six Award
- National Association for Women in Business Hall of Fame 2002
- Event Solutions Magazine Hall of Fame 2002

In addition to her business biography, Reflections of a Successful Wallflower—Lessons in Business; Lessons in Life, Michaels contributed and was featured in three business anthologies in 2010. They are: Stepping Stones to Success, featuring Deepak Chopra, Jack Canfield, Andrea Michaels and Dr. Denis Waitley; Yes You Can! Reaching Your Potential While Achieving Greatness, featuring Dr. Warren Bennis, Andrea Michaels and Jim Rohn and Bushido Business —The Fine Art of the Modern Professional with Tom Hopkins, Brian Tracy, Andrea Michaels and Stephen M. R. Covey.

Michaels has authored several magazine articles. Two of the most recent ones were published in WE Magazine for Women and are entitled Growing a Business with Creative Thinking, Part 1 and Part 2. Michaels is a regular contributor to Special Events magazine writing about her experiences speaking internationally. Michaels was also highlighted in Anaheim University's CEO Video Interview Series.

Michaels has been the subject of numerous newspaper and magazine articles. A few include Smart Business, Antelope Valley Proz, Special Events magazine, Los Angeles Times, MICE Exchange, Southern California Meetings & Events, The Los Angeles Business Journal, Antelope Valley Proz, Special Events magazine, Los Angeles Times, MICE Exchange, Southern California Meetings & Events, The Los Angeles Business Journal, ExhibitorOnline, Event Solutions, All Business/Successful Meetings, and Meetings & Conventions.

In 2007, Michaels developed a mentor program to offer an in-the-field special event education and international exchange program to assist event newcomers. Michaels is currently a faculty member at California State University, Long Beach College of Continuing and Professional Education and teaches event management.

== Affiliations ==
- Past President of Meeting Planners International, Southern California Chapter
- Member and Committee Chair for the Society of Incentive & Travel Executives
- Founding member of the International Special Events Society (ISES)
- Founding member of the Hospitality Sales and Marketing Association International
- Member of National Association of Women in Business
