= Bob Jani =

- Born: Robert Frank Jani; May 25, 1934; Los Angeles, California, U.S.
- Died: August 7, 1989 (aged 55); Rancho Palos Verdes, California, U.S.
- Resting place: Green Hills Memorial Park, Rancho Palos Verdes, California, U.S.
- Education: University of Southern California
- Occupations: Event producer, creative director, entertainment executive
- Years active: 1950s–1989
- Employer(s): University of Southern California; Pacific Pageants; The Walt Disney Company; Robert F. Jani Productions
- Known for: Main Street Electrical Parade
- Spouse: Joan Chapman (m. 1956)
- Children: 3

Robert Frank Jani (May 25, 1934 – August 7, 1989) was an American event producer, creative director, and entertainment executive who specialized in live entertainment, ceremonies, and spectaculars.

Jani is most recognized for his longtime affiliation with The Walt Disney Company and some of its most iconic pieces of live entertainment at its theme parks. He is also credited with producing the 1976 U.S. Bicentennial Celebration in New York Harbor and several Super Bowl half-time shows. In the latter part of his career, he rejuvenated Radio City Music Hall as a live entertainment venue.

== Early years ==
Jani was born in Los Angeles, California. He attended the University of Southern California (USC) and received a Bachelor of Arts degree in telecommunications and stage production and design.

== Early career ==
While studying at USC, Jani was a band manager for the Trojan Marching Band and aided USC events director Tommy Walker with logistics for performances. In early 1955, Jani followed Walker to Disneyland Park, which was scheduled to open in July. Walker had been hired by Walt Disney to stage the opening day festivities and Jani assisted him part-time.

Just prior to opening, Walker the became the head of all park entertainment (which was part of Guest Relations at the time) and Jani a Guest Relations manager—aiding Walker in creating live event concepts and promotions. Jani is credited with suggesting the park contract with guest performing groups at Christmas time, which began with the 1956 season.

At the end of 1956, Jani left Disneyland and was drafted into the U.S. Army. He served at Fort Wolters (then called Camp Wolters) near Mineral Wells, Texas as the base's entertainment director.

After his two years of service in the Army, Jani returned to USC in 1958 and became the university's director of special events. While working at USC, he is credited with the idea of a Trojan warrior riding Traveler as the school's mascot.

In 1961, Jani formed Pacific Pageants, his own event production company, as a side venture, but continued his full-time position at USC. But by early 1967, Jani's workload with Pacific Pageants had grown and he resigned from USC.

== Disney ==
Later in 1967, Jani rejoined Walt Disney Productions as director of entertainment for Disneyland, replacing Tommy Walker. Jani was quickly promoted to vice president of entertainment, and then to creative director of Walt Disney Productions.

Jani created much of the live entertainment that has become a standard at both Disneyland and the Walt Disney World Resort. Among his many achievements were America on Parade in 1976 and, perhaps his greatest Disney legacy, the Main Street Electrical Parade in 1972. Jani took the company into the world of live arena shows with Disney on Parade in 1967. Jani also conceived and supervised the multi-day opening ceremonies for Walt Disney World in October 1971, which included an orchestra made up of musicians from all over the world and a 1,076-piece marching band.

In 1976, Jani produced the Washington D.C. July 4 Inaugural "Honor America Day." Jani had his Disneyland entertainment designer Hub Braden (as a service volunteer Democrat) design the raised show stage platform and framing structure. Braden had his twin brother John Braden (as a service volunteer Republican), an ABC-NY TV staff art director, supervise set construction and installation at the presentation site. The Washington D.C. Fourth of July celebration has become an annual city, national, and televised event.

== After Disney ==
In 1978, Jani left Disney and formed Robert F. Jani Productions. Through his production company, Jani became the artistic director for Radio City Music Hall and revitalized the iconic Magnificent Christmas Spectacular. From 1979 to 1982, Jani was in charge of all live stage productions at Radio City and reestablished the New York City landmark as "The Showplace of the Nation." Among the other spectacular undertakings Jani produced in the 5,882-seat theater were America, which had a 27-week record run, and Encore and Manhattan Showboat, which received critical and public acclaim.

Among his other post-Disney achievements was work on the inaugural ceremonies for Ronald Reagan as president in both 1981 and 1985. In 1981, Jani was commissioned by Dr. Robert Schuller to create The Glory of Christmas pageant for Schuller's Crystal Cathedral. Jani was also artistic director for the Hollywood Bowl, producer of several television specials, and produced the opening ceremonies of the 1982 Knoxville World's Fair.

Jani also continued to consult for Disney. He was the supervising producer on the opening ceremonies for EPCOT in 1982. He created the master plan for the opening and closing ceremonies of the 1984 Summer Olympics in Los Angeles on behalf of Disney, did not provide the staging, which eventually was awarded to David L. Wolper when Disney pulled out of the ceremonies. Jani was also the master entertainment planning consultant for Disneyland Paris and the Disney-MGM Studios Theme Park (now known as Disney's Hollywood Studios) at Walt Disney World.

Jani worked worldwide as producer and production consultant during his last years. Along with Tommy Walker and Andrea Elizabeth Michaels, he is noted as a live event industry pioneer.

== Personal life and death ==
Jani married Joan Chapman in 1956. They had three children, two of whom survived into adulthood—Joy and Jeff.

Robert Jani died on August 7, 1989 at his Rancho Palos Verdes home after a three-year struggle with amyotrophic lateral sclerosis (ALS), known commonly as Lou Gehrig's disease. For his contributions to the Disney legacy, Jani was posthumously given a window on Main Street, U.S.A. in Disneyland in 1996 and was named a Disney Legend in 2005.
