= SpectroMagic =

Former parade at Magic Kingdom

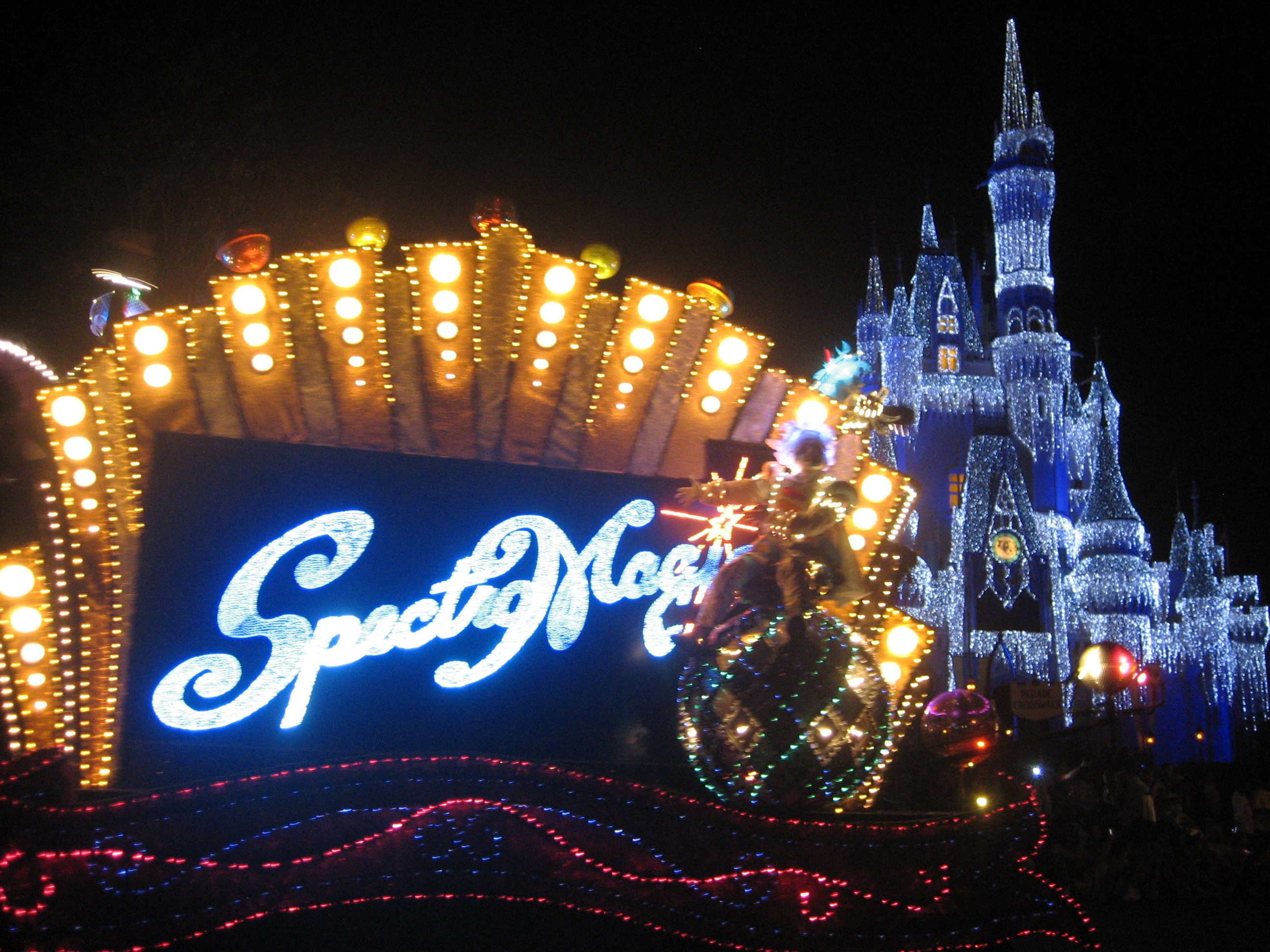

Magic Kingdom
- Status: Removed
- Opening date: October 1, 1991 (first run); April 2, 2001 (second run)
- Closing date: May 21, 1999 (first run); June 4, 2010 (second run)
- Replaced: Main Street Electrical Parade
- Replaced by: Main Street Electrical Parade (1999 & 2010); Disney Starlight: Dream the Night Away (2025)

Ride statistics
- Attraction type: Parade
- Duration: 20 minutes (average)
- Announcer: Jiminy Cricket

SpectroMagic was a nighttime parade presented in Magic Kingdom at the Walt Disney World Resort. It was introduced in 1991 as part of the park's 20th-anniversary celebrations, replacing the Main Street Electrical Parade. The parade originally ran from 1991 to 1999, then returned from 2001 to 2010.

== Summary ==
=== Opening announcement ===
"Welcome to the splendor, the spectacle, the sparkling sensation, where the romance, the comedy, and the thrill of Disney fantasies come to electric life. And now, the Magic Kingdom proudly presents, in a million points of musical light, the magic worlds of Disney...in SpectroMagic!"

=== Parade Units ===
The parade's overarching plot was about Mickey Mouse, along with the SpectroMagic Spectromen, who together create the power of "SpectroMagic".

Throughout its 17 years of nightly performances at Magic Kingdom, the SpectroMagic Parade had various lineups. These ranged from different characters being in different locations in the parade to whole units being in a different order. The parade consisted of 23 units, with some of the units consisting of more than one float. Overall, the parade had 39 floats:

The Worlds of Music from the Silly Symphonies

- SpectroMagic Trumpeters Unit
- SpectroMagic Whirly-Balls (four Whirly-Balls)
- SpectroMagic Title Unit
- SpectroMagic Mickey Mouse's Unit
- Silly Symphonies Unit (four separate floats connected together)

The Wonder of Sleeping Beauty's Garden

- Sleeping Beauty's Garden Unit 1
- Sleeping Beauty's Garden Unit 2
- Sleeping Beauty's Garden Unit 3

The Fantasy of The Little Mermaid's Ocean

- Giant Fish Unit
- School of Fish Unit (two separate whirling floats)
- Ursula Unit
- The Little Mermaid Unit (three separate Floats)
- Orange Fish and Gray Fish

The Imagination of Fantasia

- Fantasia Opening Unit
- Bacchus Unit
- Diana Unit (three separate floats)
- Chernabog Unit

The World of Dreams in a Grand Disney Cavalcade

- First Finale Unit (three separate floats)
- Carousel Unit
- Second Finale Unit (three separate floats)

=== Characters ===
With 45+ Disney characters, 14 Spectromen, and 8 Butterflies, the parade required 65+ performers nightly, including: Mickey Mouse, Roger Rabbit [Original Run], Genie [Secondary Run], Goofy, Golden Harp [Mickey and the Beanstalk], Chip, Dale, Fauna, Flora, Merryweather, Ursula, Ariel, King Triton, Ostriches (x5) [Fantasia], Big Bad Wolf, Br'er Bear, Br'er Fox [Original Run], Fifer Pig, Fiddler Pig, Practical Pig, Jaq, Gus, Prince Charming, Cinderella, Alice, White Rabbit, The Queen of Hearts, Mary Poppins, Peter Pan, Mr. Smee, Snow White, Grumpy, Doc, Bashful, Sneezy, Sleepy, Happy, The Evil Queen, Captain Hook, Dopey, Pinocchio, Geppetto, Donald Duck, Minnie Mouse and Pluto

=== Closing announcement ===
"So long! From Jiminy Cricket... in SpectroMagic!"

== History ==
The parade's soundtrack was released as its own album in 2001, rather than being featured on the Walt Disney World Official Album.

In 2013, following reports that the SpectroMagic floats had been destroyed, Disney confirmed that the parade had been permanently retired.

The Piece of Disney History collection became "A Piece of SpectroMagic History" Collection for the year 2014. Each month one, limited-edition Disney pin was released and contained different original elements from the former SpectroMagic parade.
