= Epcot =

Theme park at Walt Disney World

- Logo used since 2019

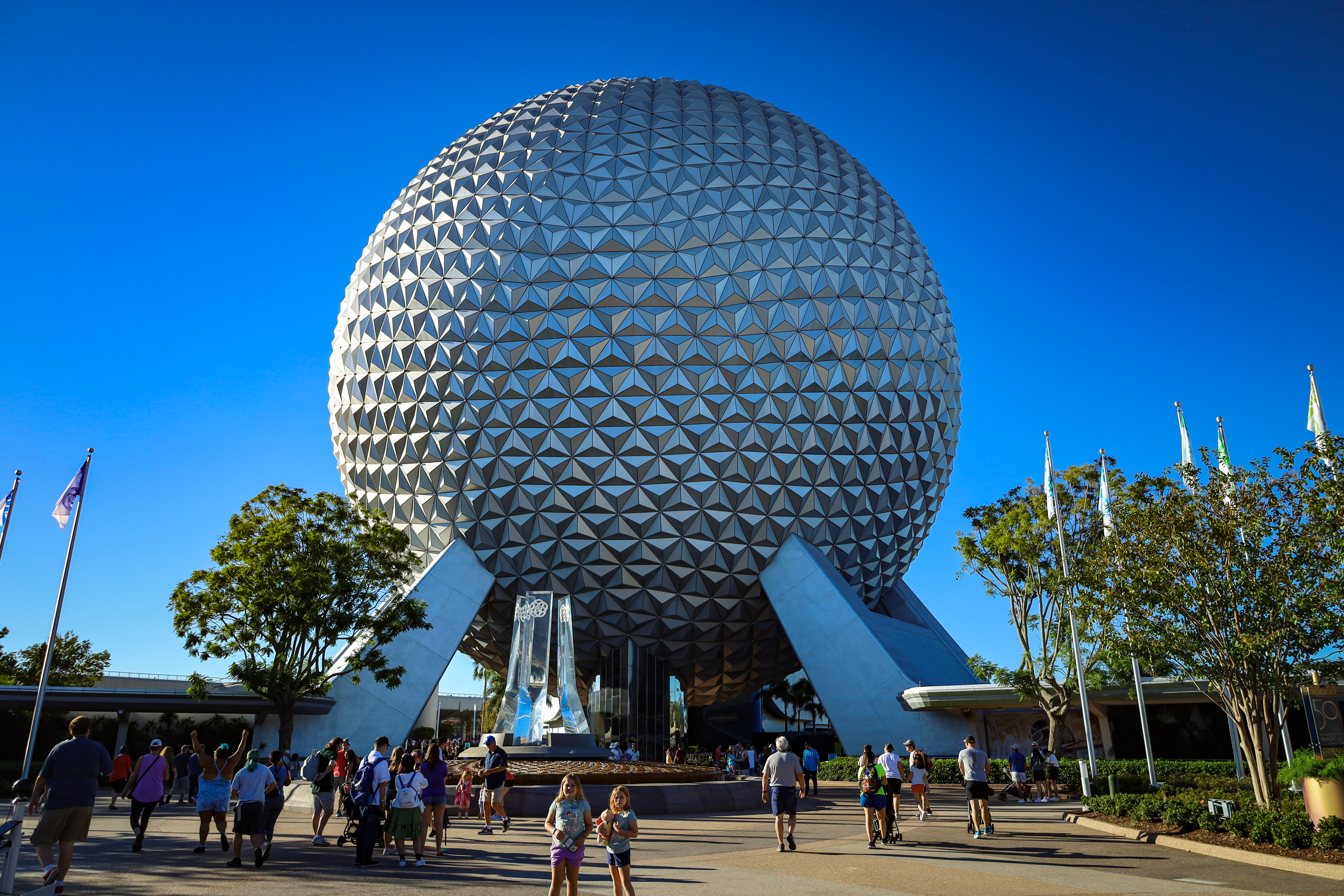
- Spaceship Earth, the landmark of Epcot
- Interactive map of Epcot
- Location: Walt Disney World, Bay Lake, Florida, United States
- Coordinates: 28°22′16″N 81°33′00″W
- Status: Operating
- Opened: October 1, 1982 (44 years ago)
- Owner: Disney Experiences (The Walt Disney Company)
- Operated by: Walt Disney World; Key people: Matt Simon (VP); Javier Rossy (GM, Operations)
- Theme: Human achievement; Technological innovation; International culture
- Slogan: The magic of possibility
- Operating season: Year-round
- Website: Epcot
Preceding station	Walt Disney World Monorail System	Following station
Transportation and Ticket Center Terminus	Epcot Line	Terminus

EPCOT (an acronym for its original concept, the Experimental Prototype Community of Tomorrow) is a theme park at Walt Disney World Resort in Bay Lake, Florida. Epcot is owned and operated by the Walt Disney Company through its Disney Experiences division. The park opened on October 1, 1982, as EPCOT Center—the second of four theme parks built at the resort. Often referred to as a "permanent world's fair", Epcot is dedicated to the celebration of human achievement, particularly technological innovation and international culture. Epcot is also known for its iconic landmark, Spaceship Earth, a geodesic sphere.

The EPCOT name originated as an acronym for Experimental Prototype Community Of Tomorrow, envisioned by Walt Disney during early development of the Florida property. After Disney's death in 1966, the company felt his grand vision was impractical. However, it laid the groundwork for EPCOT Center, a theme park that retained the core spirit of Disney's vision. The park was divided into two distinct areas: Future World reprises the idea of showcasing modern innovation through educational entertainment attractions within avant-garde pavilions, while World Showcase highlights the diversity of human cultures from various nations. From the late 2010s to the early 2020s, the park underwent a major overhaul, adding new attractions and Future World was restructured into three areas: World Celebration, World Discovery and World Nature.

The park spans 305 acres (123 hectares), more than twice the size of Magic Kingdom Park. In 2025, the park attracted 12.109 million guests, making it the eighth-most visited theme park in the world.

== History ==
=== 1960s: Experimental concept ===
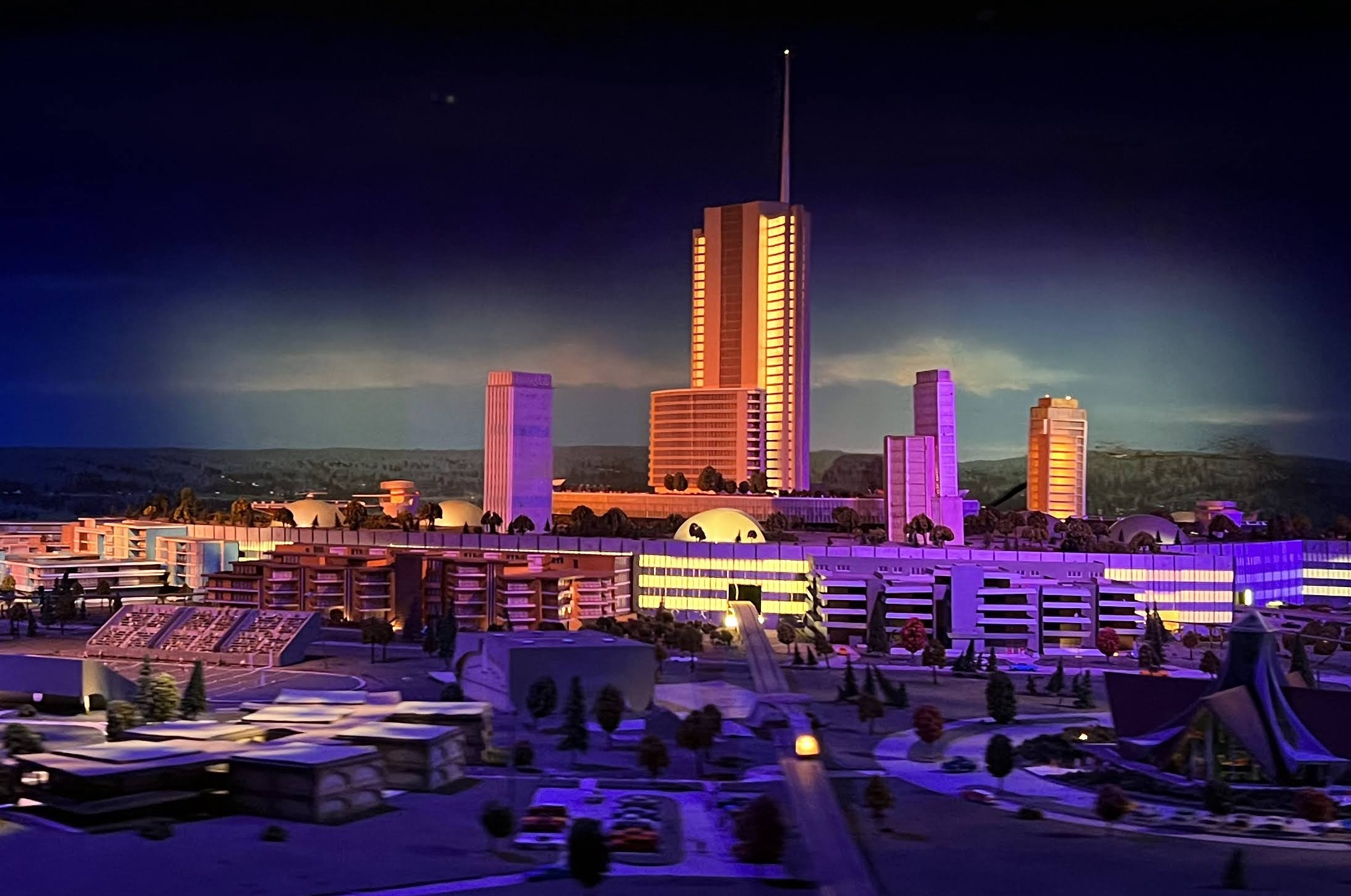
The remaining portion of the Progress City model, the original concept for the city of EPCOT, seen on display from the PeopleMover at Magic Kingdom in 2026

The genesis for Epcot was originally conceived as a utopian city of the future by Walt Disney in the 1960s. The concept was an acronym for Experimental Prototype Community of Tomorrow, often interchanging "city" and "community." In Walt Disney's words in 1966: "EPCOT will take its cue from the new ideas and new technologies that are now emerging from the creative centers of American industry. It will be a community of tomorrow that will never be completed but will always be introducing and testing, and demonstrating new materials and new systems. And EPCOT will always be a showcase to the world of the ingenuity and imagination of American free enterprise."

Walt Disney's original vision, sometimes called Progress City, would have been home to 20,000 residents and would be a living laboratory showcasing cutting-edge technology and urban planning. It was to be built in the shape of a circle with an urban city center in the center with community buildings, schools, and recreational complexes. It would be surrounded by rings of residential areas and industrial areas, all connected by monorail and PeopleMover lines. Automobile traffic would be kept underground, leaving pedestrians safe above ground. This radial plan concept is strongly influenced by British planner Ebenezer Howard and his Garden Cities of To-morrow.

Disney went as far as petitioning the Florida State Legislature for the creation of the Reedy Creek Improvement District (RCID), with the authority of a governmental body over the Walt Disney World land. The RCID was established in 1967. However, Walt Disney was not able to obtain funding and permission to start work on his Florida property until he agreed to first build the Magic Kingdom theme park. He died in 1966, nearly five years before Magic Kingdom opened.

=== 1970s: Concept evolves into park, construction begins ===
After Walt Disney's death, the company decided that it did not want to be in the business of running a city without Walt's guidance. The original plans for the park showed indecision over the park's purpose. Some Imagineers wanted it to represent the cutting edge of emerging technologies, while others wanted it to showcase international cultures and customs. At one point, a model of the futuristic park was pushed together against a model of a World's Fair international theme, and the two were combined.

The park was originally named EPCOT Center to reflect the ideals and values of the city. It was constructed for an estimated $800 million to $1.4 billion and took three years to build, at the time the largest construction project on Earth. The park spans 305 acres (123 hectares), more than twice the size of Magic Kingdom. The parking lot serving the park is 141 acres (57 ha) (including bus area) and can accommodate 11,211 vehicles.

Groundbreaking for EPCOT Center happened on October 1, 1979 with Florida Governor Bob Graham participating in the groundbreaking ceremony while former Governors Haydon Burns, Claude Kirk and Reubin Askew spoke at the groundbreaking ceremony; 300 representatives participated in the ceremony. EPCOT center's budget for construction was initially much smaller at $300 million but later grew with corporate sponsors contributing alongside Disney. In the end the project cost $1.5 billion with Disney paying around 80% at $1.2 billion while corporate sponsors contributed the rest. Construction was managed by Tishman.

=== 1980s: Opening and operation ===
The grand opening festivities for EPCOT Center took place over three weeks in October 1982—supervised and directed by Disney Legend Bob Jani. The park officially opened to the public on October 1, with a dedication ceremony in front of Spaceship Earth that served as both the kick-off ceremony as well as the dedication of the Spaceship Earth attraction itself. Presiding over the ceremony was Walt Disney Productions chairman and CEO Card Walker, Florida Governor Bob Graham, and president of AT&T (the sponsor of Spaceship Earth at opening) William Ellinghaus. Tickets cost $15 for adults, $14 for juniors (those 11 to 17 years old) and $12 for children (guests between 3 and 11 years old) at the park’s opening. Prior to the opening of the park, cast members, construction workers along with construction workers on the site were allowed to visit during select times.

On opening day, Future World featured six pavilions: Spaceship Earth, CommuniCore, Journey Into Imagination, The Land, Universe of Energy, and World of Motion. World Showcase featured nine pavilions: Mexico, China, Germany, Italy, The American Adventure, Japan, France, United Kingdom, and Canada.

Each pavilion had its own custom opening ceremony throughout the next three weeks—culminating in the three-day grand opening event. On October 24, 1982, EPCOT Center was officially dedicated by Walt Disney Productions executive chairman Donn Tatum and Card Walker. A 450-piece marching band made up of players from college bands all over the country performed several songs including "We've Just Begun to Dream" and "The World Showcase March"—the latter written exclusively for the opening events by the Sherman Brothers. Water was gathered from major rivers, lakes, and seas from across the globe and emptied into the park's Fountain of Nations to mark the opening.

During the 1980s, several additional pavilions opened: Horizons in 1983, Morocco in 1984, The Living Seas in 1986, Norway in 1988, and Wonders of Life in 1989.

=== 1990s–2000s: Change in vision ===
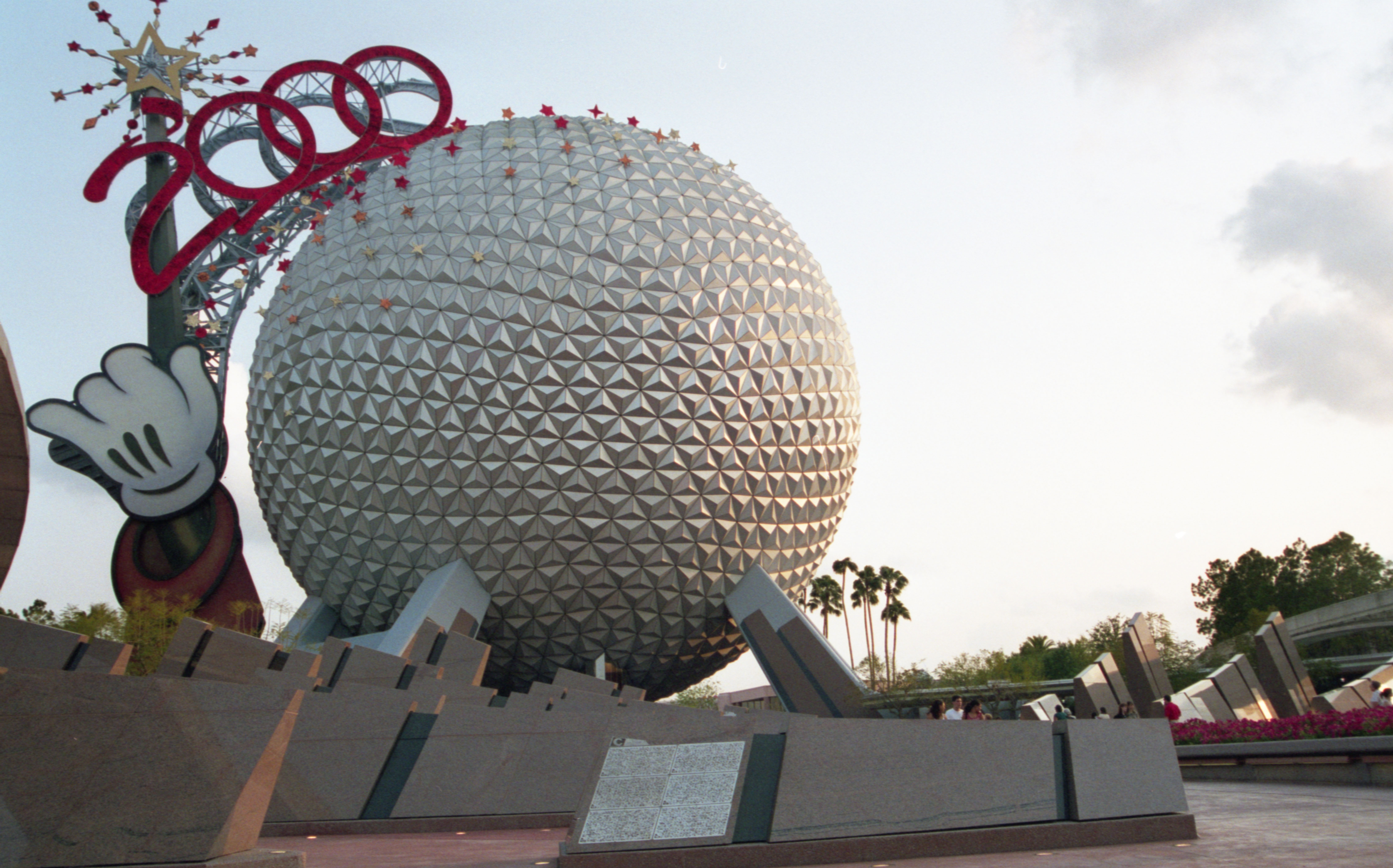
Spaceship Earth decorated for the Millennium Celebration.

Despite its initial success, Epcot was constantly faced with the challenges of evolving with worldwide progress, an issue that caused the park to lose relevance and become outdated in the 1990s. To maintain attendance levels, Disney introduced seasonal events such as the International Flower & Garden Festival and the International Food & Wine Festival in 1994 and 1995, respectively.

It was during this era that Disney sought to differentiate the Epcot theme park from Walt Disney's EPCOT concept by making the park's name a word rather than an acronym—spelling it in lowercase as a proper noun: "Epcot". Walt Disney World then added the current year to the park's name, emulating the naming scheme for expos and world's fairs like Expo 67. The park became Epcot '94 and Epcot '95 before Disney quietly abandoned the naming concept in 1996 and the park simply became Epcot.

In 1994, Captain EO performed its last show of its original run, being directly replaced by Honey, I Shrunk the Audience that year. In the mid-1990s, Disney also began to gradually phase out the park's edutainment attractions in favor of more modern and thrilling attractions. As a result, many of the attractions within the Future World pavilions were either overhauled or replaced entirely. The Land pavilion saw its attractions replaced under new sponsor Nestlé between late 1993 and January 1995, and Spaceship Earth was updated with music by Edo Guidotti and narration from Jeremy Irons in 1994. Universe of Energy was reconfigured as Ellen's Energy Adventure in 1996. Journey Into Imagination closed in 1998 and was replaced with Journey into YOUR Imagination the following year, World of Motion was replaced with Test Track, and Horizons was demolished in 1999 and replaced with Mission: SPACE in 2003.

In 2000, Walt Disney World held the Millennium Celebration with the central focus of the event at Epcot, and a 25-story "magic wand" structure was built next to Spaceship Earth. Millennium Village was closed on January 1, 2001, and was turned into the World Showplace festival center, which is frequently used for Epcot festivals.

Attraction changes continued into the new millennium. Journey into YOUR Imagination closed in 2001 due to strong negative reception and was replaced with Journey into Imagination with Figment in 2002. The Living Seas was closed in 2005, and rethemed with the introduction of characters from Finding Nemo, as The Seas with Nemo & Friends. That same year, Soarin', a flight simulator ride originally developed for Disney California Adventure Park, was added to The Land (replacing Food Rocks) following its massive popularity in California, opening alongside Lights, Motors, Action!: Extreme Stunt Show at Disney's Hollywood Studios during the Happiest Celebration on Earth festival. The Wonders of Life pavilion closed in 2007, with the pavilion being occasionally used for the park's annual festivals until permanent closure. The Mexico pavilion's El Rio del Tiempo attraction closed on January 2, and Gran Fiesta Tour Starring The Three Caballeros opened in its space a few months later. After the "magic wand" structure was removed from Spaceship Earth around early summer, the attraction's fourth version, narrated by Judi Dench, soft-opened on December 8. Kim Possible World Showcase Adventure, an interactive scavenger hunt, opened at Epcot in 2009.

=== 2010s–present: Transformation and redesign ===
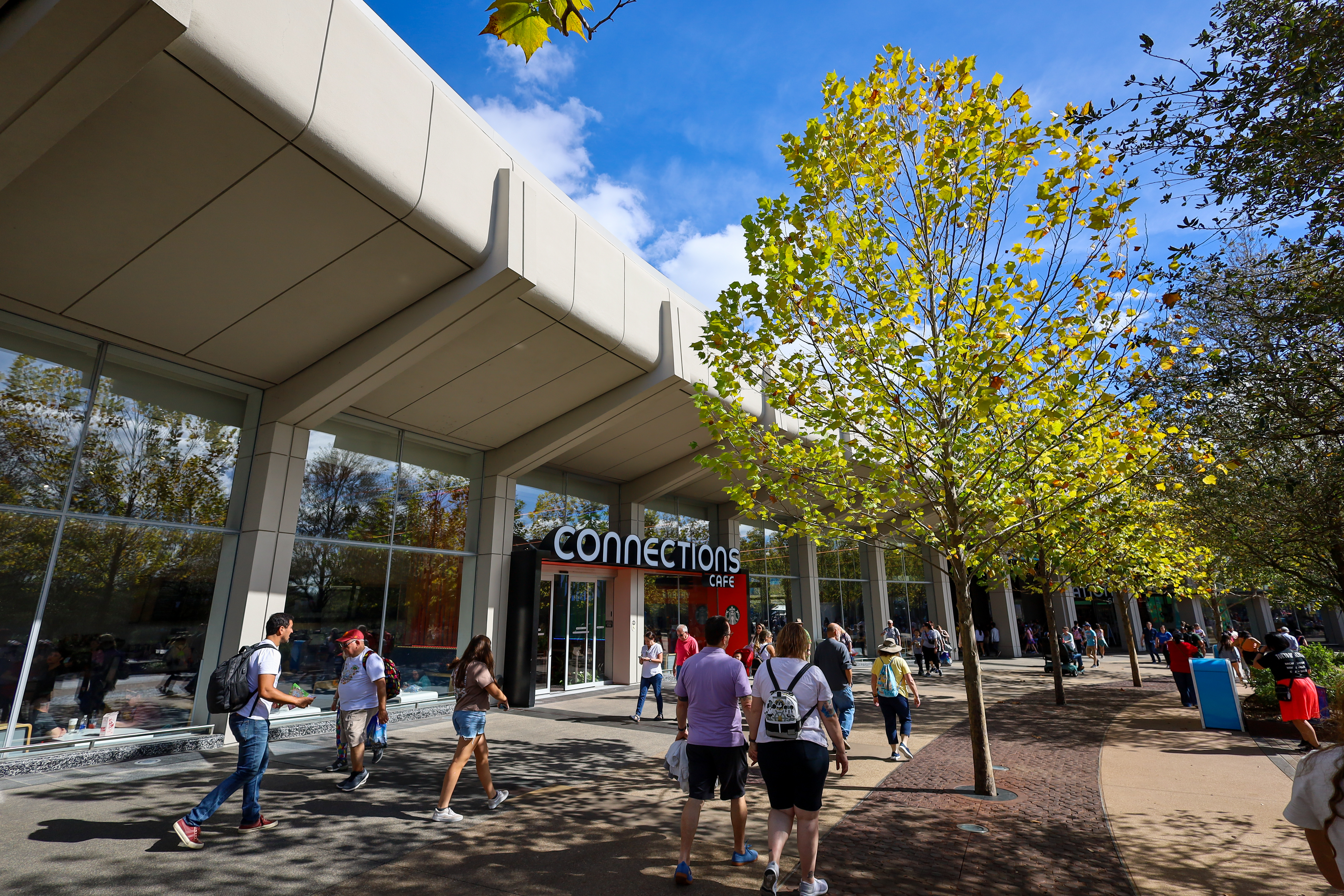
As part of Future World's overhaul from 2019 to 2024, several original structures were reutilized, such as the CommuniCore Pavilion being repurposed as Connections Cafe.

In 2012, Test Track was refurbished into a new version presented by Chevrolet, and Kim Possible World Showcase Adventure was rethemed to Agent P's World Showcase Adventure the same year. The Norway pavilion's Maelstrom attraction closed in 2014 and replaced two years later by Frozen Ever After. Soarin' was also temporarily closed while a new film was added to the attraction. In 2017, Mission: SPACE was divided into a new green/Earth mission, and the original orange/Mars mission.

In November 2016, Disney revealed that Epcot would be receiving “a major transformation” that would help transition the park into being “more Disney, timeless, relevant, family-friendly”. In July 2017, the formal announcement came that Epcot would undergo a multi-year redesign and expansion plan that would introduce Guardians of the Galaxy and Ratatouille attractions to Future World and World Showcase, respectively, as well as maintaining the original vision and spirit for the park. As part of the announcement, Ellen's Energy Adventure closed the following month, and the pavilion's show building was reused for Guardians of the Galaxy: Cosmic Rewind, while the Epcot 35 Legacy Showcase exhibition opened in the Odyssey Pavilion. That same year, the park reported the first drop in overall attendance ranking among the four Walt Disney World Resort parks, dropping from second to third place, the first in its history.

On August 25, 2019, at the 2019 D23 Expo, Disney expanded on the plans for the improvements to Epcot. One of the most significant changes announced was the creation of four distinct "neighborhoods"; the subdivision of Future World into three areas (World Celebration, World Discovery, and World Nature). Journey of Water—Inspired by Moana, a walkthrough attraction, was also announced. At the same expo, Disney also announced that Pinar Toprak would be composing a new musical anthem for the park. Toprak's "Epcot Anthem" was eventually used in various nighttime shows, such as Harmonious and Luminous, as well as featured in ambient music within the entrance plaza and throughout World Celebration.

On October 1, 2019, it was announced that a new nighttime fireworks show, Epcot Forever, and The Epcot Experience Center, a preview space for the park's expansion project, narrated by Judi Dench, would replace IllumiNations: Reflections of Earth and Epcot 35 Legacy Showcase. In late 2019, Epcot installed new directory signage in Seabase Alpha, restoring the former Living Seas logo, as the pavilion was renamed to The Seas Pavilion. Agent P's World Showcase Adventure closed on February 23, 2020; it was slated to be replaced with DuckTales World Showcase Adventure, which did not open until 2022.

In early 2020, Disney officially announced that the park would be rebranded in all-uppercase letters (from Epcot to EPCOT) as an homage to both the park's original name and Walt Disney's original concept—although the name is still not an acronym.

Epcot was closed from March 16 to July 15, 2020, due to the COVID-19 pandemic in Florida. Modified operations were established, including a pause on concerts and fireworks, in order to promote sufficient physical distancing. Spaceship Earth: Our Shared Story, the attraction's fifth update, the Wondrous China film, the PLAY! pavilion in World Discovery, and the United Kingdom pavilion's Cherry Tree Lane expansion were indefinitely delayed due to the COVID-19 pandemic, and the CommuniCore Hall exhibit space and the CommuniCore Plaza festival stage was built instead of a three-level festival pavilion.

On September 29, 2021, the nighttime spectacular Harmonious replaced Epcot Forever as part of the resort's 50th anniversary celebration. The show ended its run on March 31, 2023, in preparation for Luminous: The Symphony of Us which debuted later that year; Epcot Forever returned during the interim period. Remy's Ratatouille Adventure (duplicated from Disneyland Paris) opened in the France pavilion on October 1 as part of the same celebrations. The Epcot Experience Center closed in 2022, and Guardians of the Galaxy: Cosmic Rewind opened on May 27.

Journey of Water: Inspired by Moana opened in World Nature opened on October 16, 2023, and World Celebration Gardens, divided into five sections (Inspiration Gardens, CommuniCore Gardens, Connections Gardens, Creations Gardens, and Dreamers Point) opened on December 5 of that year. On March 31, 2024, it was announced that a new live show, "Forces of Nature" by AntiGravity, which ran until the final performance on June 5, 2025, in Inspiration Gardens near the locations of World Nature, and featured aerial acrobatic performers representing Mother Nature and different elements. CommuniCore Hall and Plaza, named after the former Future World pavilion, opened to the general public on June 10, 2024. Test Track, closed for refurbishment on June 17 to make way for the attraction's third iteration, opened on July 22, 2025, with the return of the old sponsorship, General Motors. At D23 2024, it was announced that a new lounge, Geo–82 and Geo–82 Fireworks Experience, would took the place of the former Siemens lounge attached to Spaceship Earth; it opened on June 4, 2025. and it was reserved for adults only.

On November 21, 2024, it was announced that the second stage has been installed in the CommuniCore Plaza Stage, and the stage will be the home of "Joyful! A Celebration of the Season", as a seasonal entertainment offering during the 2024 annual Epcot International Festival of the Holidays. On March 23, 2025, a fire broke out near the area.

On October 5, 2025, it was announced that the Frozen Ever After attraction in the Norway Pavilion at Epcot will receive upgrades, including the audio-animatronic figures, using updated technology introduced in the newer World of Frozen attraction at Hong Kong Disneyland, when the upgrades could be completed on February 12, 2026. On October 20, 2025, it was announced that two different versions of the attraction as Soarin' Around the World will be temporarily closed soon to make way for a new film, Soarin' Across America, which will premiere on May 26, 2026 in The Land Pavilion at EPCOT's World Nature, after it was announced that the Florida version of the attraction will be permanently closed on May 13, 2026, and on July 2, 2026 in Grizzly Peak at Disney California Adventure and, for the 250th anniversary celebration of United States. On November 10, 2025, it was announced that the attraction, Remy's Ratatouille Adventure, was temporarily closed for a short refurbishment until it was reopened and debuts a 2D conversion on November 14, 2025 in France Pavilion at EPCOT's World Showcase.

In June 2026, since Refreshment Port in EPCOT's World Showcase, are now permanently closed on January 12, 2026, it was announced that a new dining space called La Poutinerie, sponsored by Air Canada, which will be open on July 1, 2026 in Canada Pavilion at EPCOT, and the menu have been revealed. More details were released in August 2026 at D23: The Ultimate Disney Fan Event 2026, which revealed that two attractions in World Celebration, where Spaceship Earth will receive updates (which is rather than using the Our Shared Story subtitle) that expand its story from human communication to the broader theme of human connection, and Journey into Imagination will also receive updates that Dreamfinder will return and Figment will be reunited to the attraction.

== Park layout and attractions ==
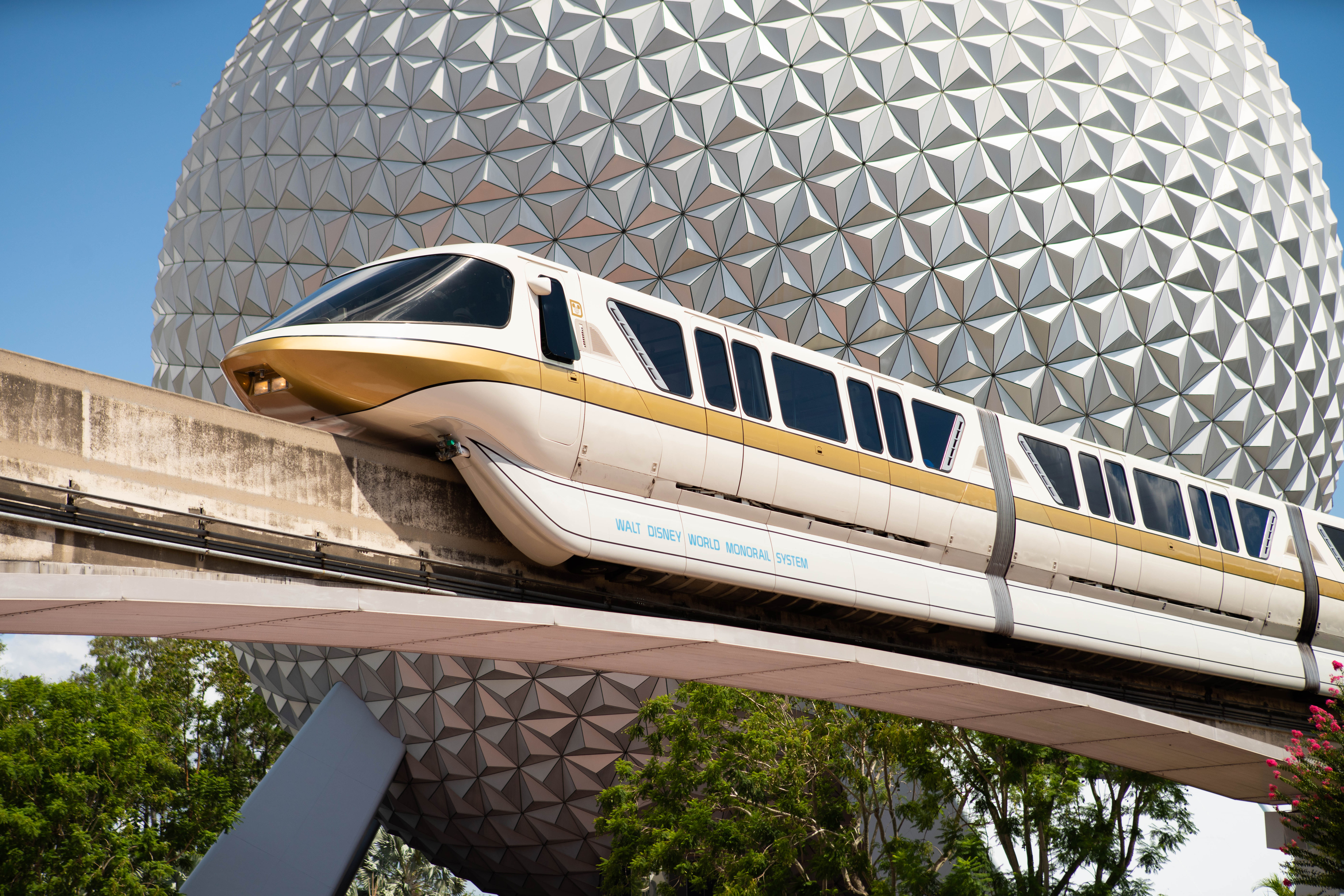
The Walt Disney World Monorail System passes through World Celebration—providing transport between the park, Magic Kingdom, and the Transportation and Ticket Center.

Epcot is divided into four themed areas, known as "neighborhoods": World Celebration, World Discovery, World Nature, and World Showcase.

World Celebration, Discovery, and Nature house a variety of avant-garde pavilions that explore innovative aspects and applications including technology and science, with each pavilion featuring self-contained attractions and distinct architecture in its design. Currently, the park features nine major pavilions: Galaxy, Imagination, Journey, Land, Motion, Odyssey, Seas, Space, and Spaceship Earth. World Showcase has eleven individual nation pavilions.

World Celebration, Discovery, and Nature were originally grouped as one area called Future World, which debuted with six pavilions: Spaceship Earth, CommuniCore, Imagination!, The Land, Universe of Energy, and World of Motion. The Horizons pavilion opened the following year, and The Living Seas and Wonders of Life pavilions were added in 1986 and 1989, respectively, bringing the lineup to nine. CommuniCore, World of Motion, Horizons, Wonders of Life, Universe of Energy, and Innoventions closed in 1994, 1996, 1999, 2007, 2017, and 2019, respectively. The Fountain of Nations, a large circular musical fountain which debuted with the park, was removed in 2019 as well. Each pavilion was initially sponsored by a corporation which helped fund its construction and maintenance in return for the corporation's logos and some marketing elements appearing throughout the pavilion.

Additionally, each pavilion of Future World featured a unique circular logo designed by Norm Inouye (except for the Wonders of Life logo due to its later introduction), which was featured on park signage and throughout the attractions themselves. The pavilion logos were gradually phased out in the early 2000s, as the pavilions instead were identified by name and recognized by the main attraction(s) housed inside. Several homages remained scattered throughout the park, including merchandising. However, in 2019, the circular pavilion logos were revived as part of the park's transformation, with both classic logos reprised and refreshed and newer logos introduced.

=== World Celebration ===
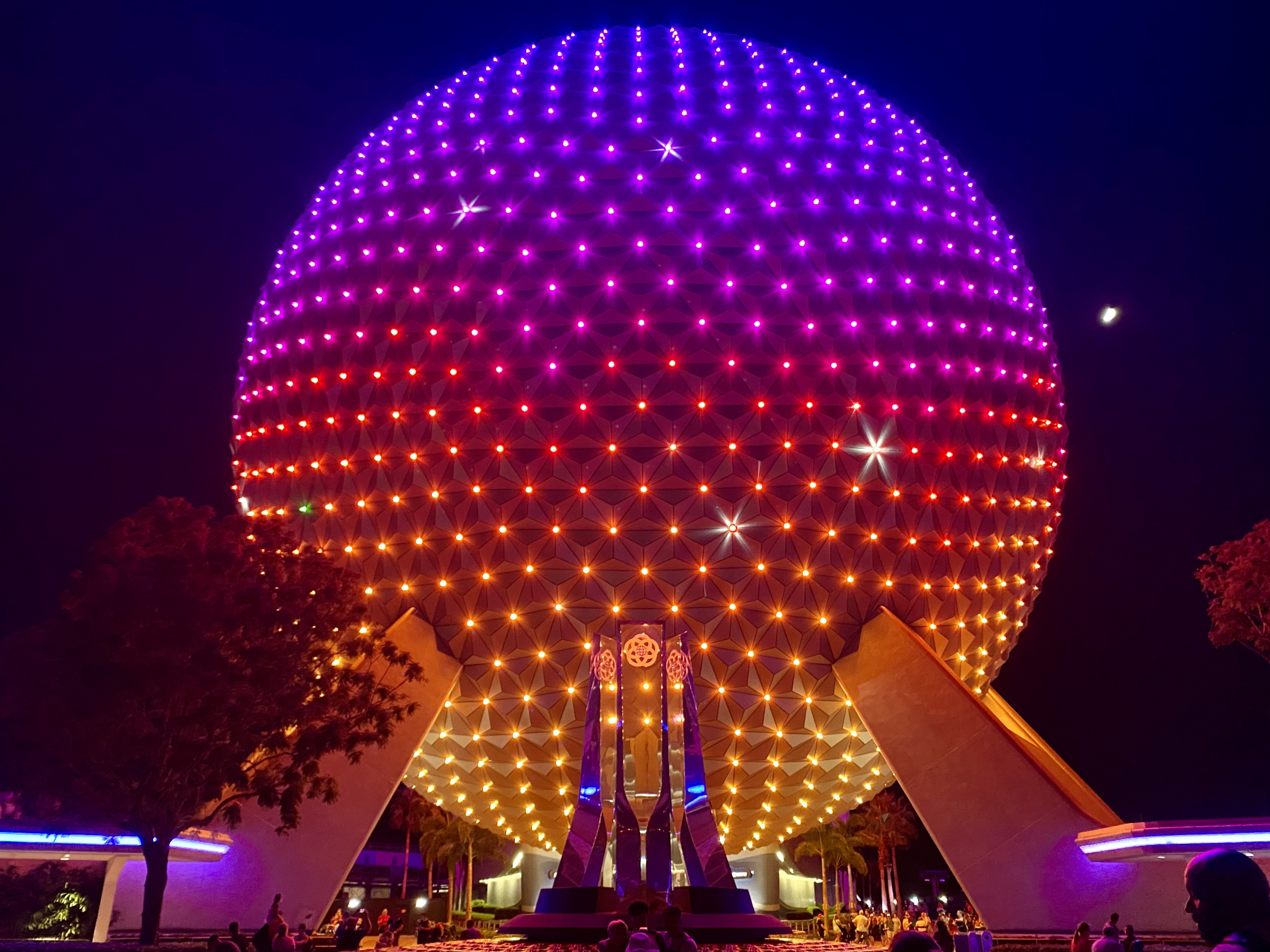
Spaceship Earth

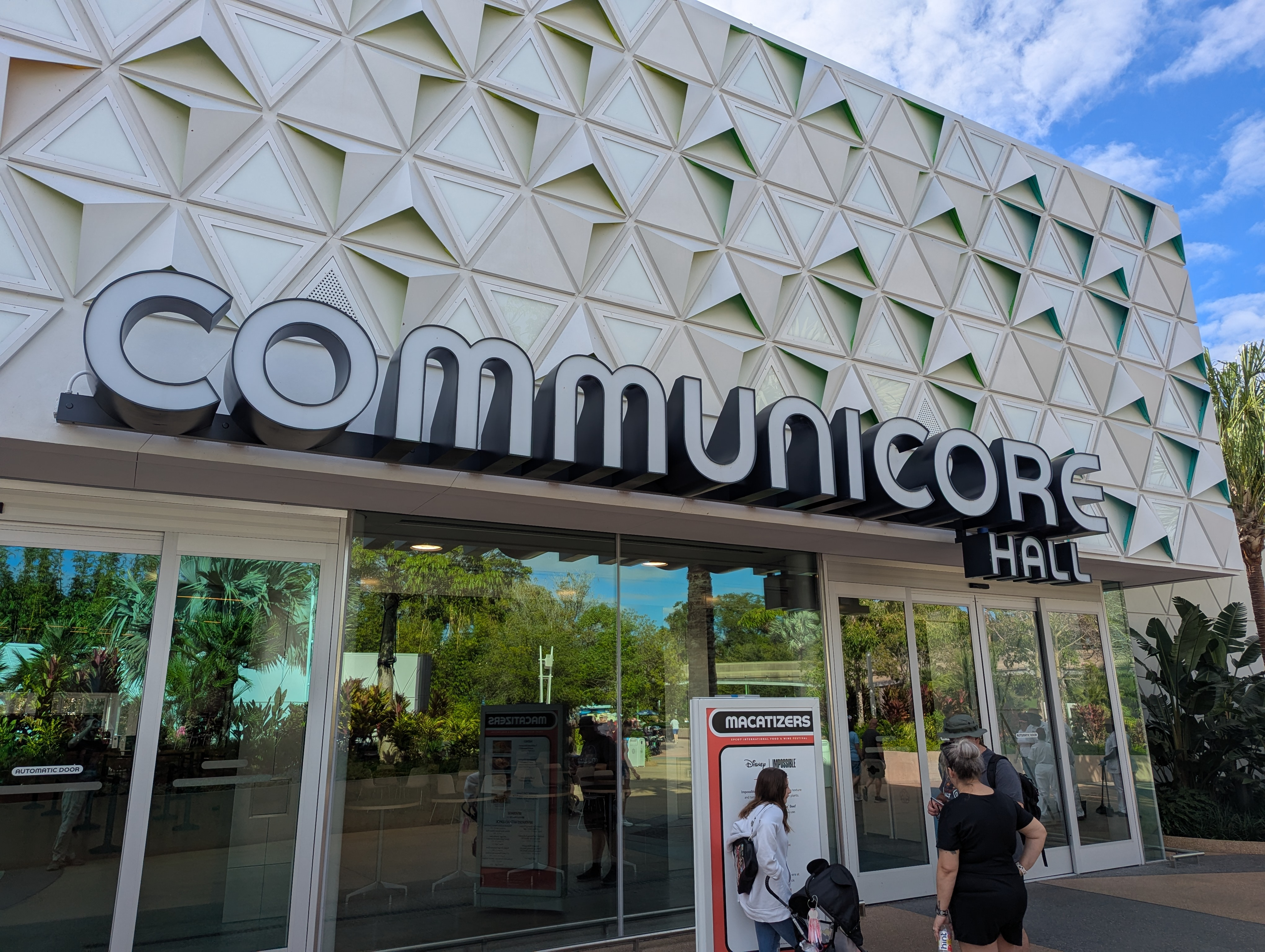
CommuniCore Hall

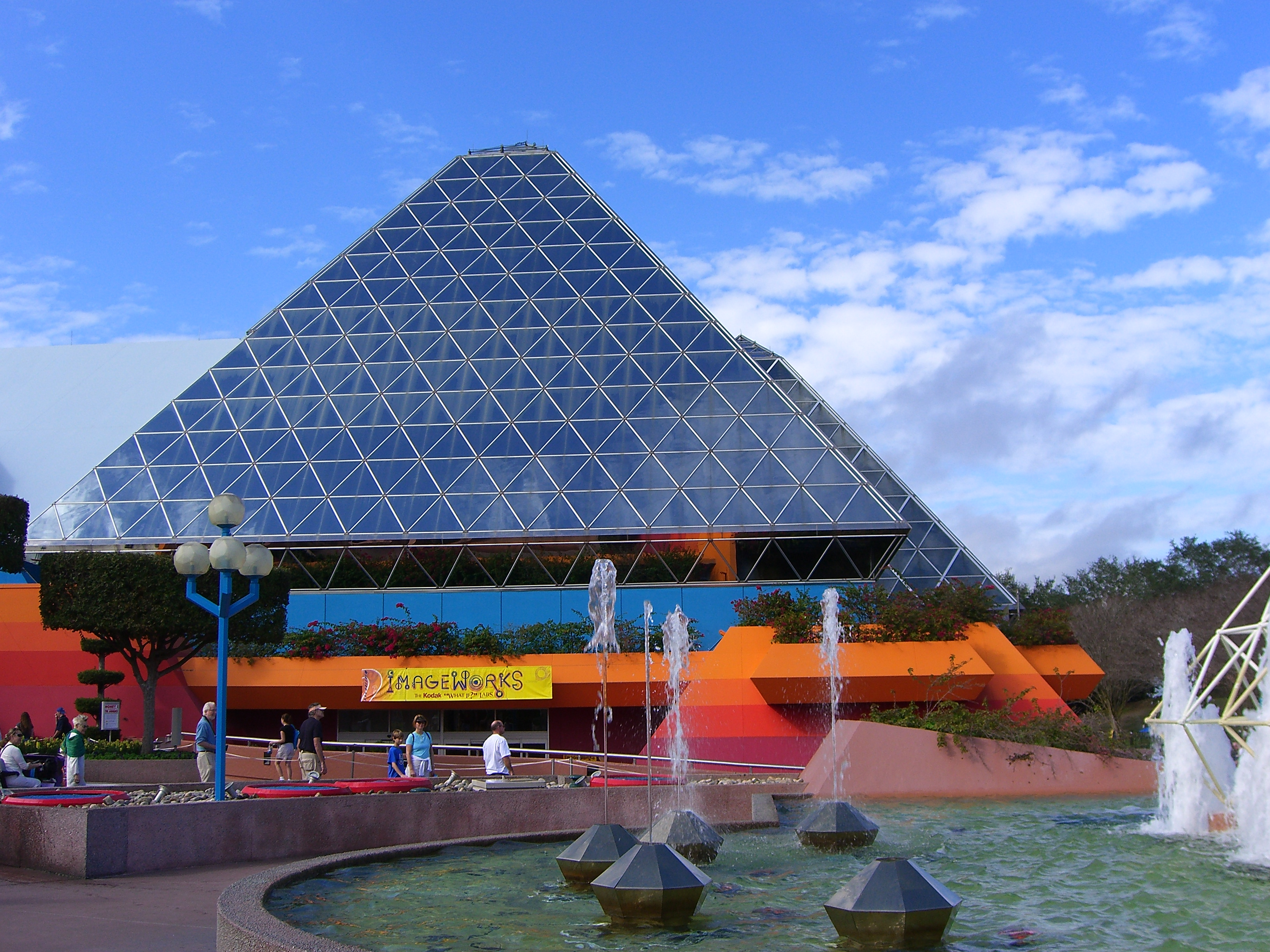
Imagination!
(formerly Journey Into Imagination)

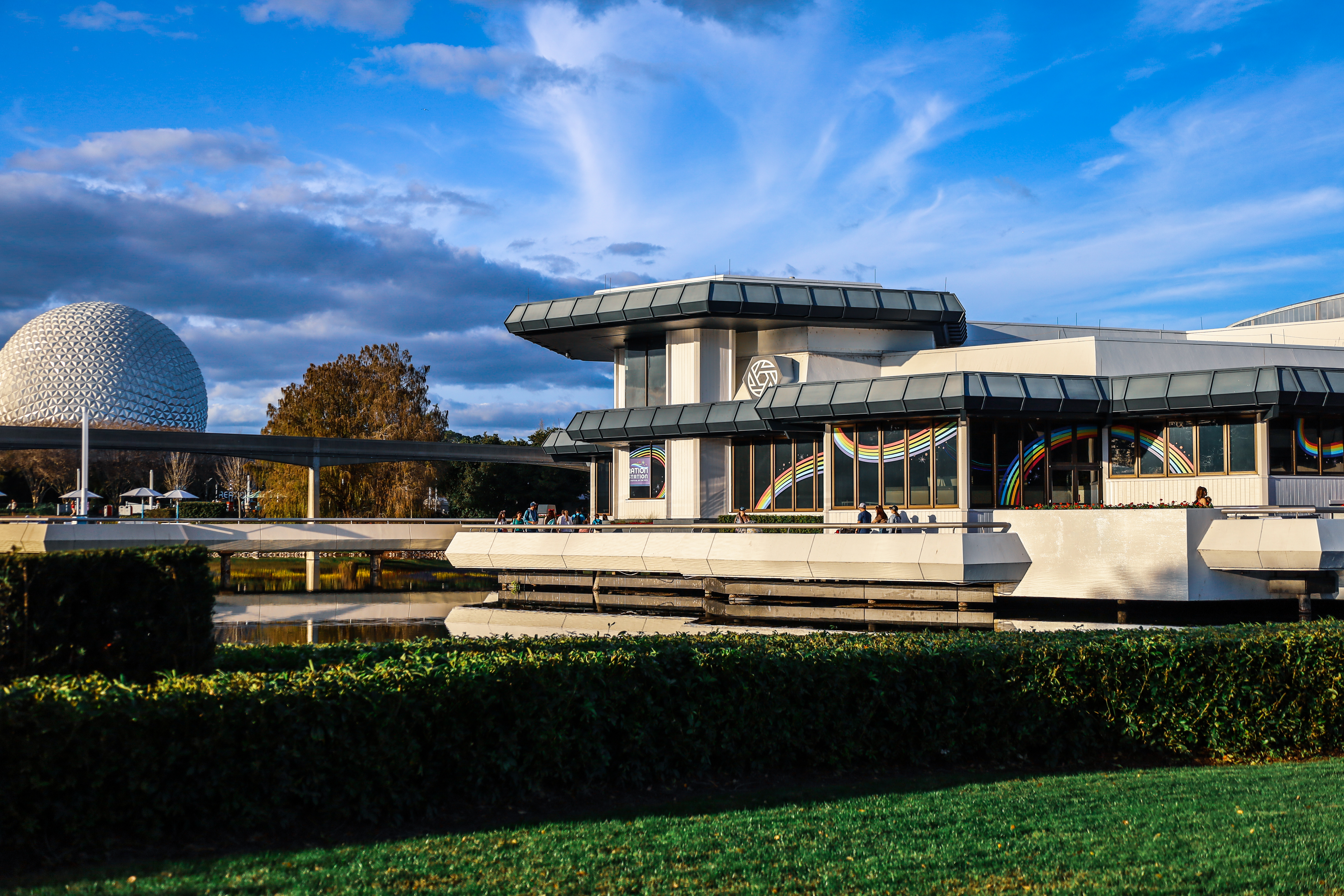
Odyssey

World Celebration serves as the park's main entrance and a central hub that honors global human interaction and connection, including communication, imagination, creativity, and the visual and culinary arts. The neighborhood features four major pavilions—Spaceship Earth, Imagination, Odyssey, and CommuniCore—as well as additional attractions, shops, and restaurants.

Guests enter through the main entrance and walk underneath Spaceship Earth, an eighteen-story-tall geodesic sphere structure and the anchor pavilion, which also houses an eponymous dark ride attraction that depicts the history of communication. Directly behind Spaceship Earth are the World Celebration Gardens and Dreamers Point, featuring lush interactive gardens, lighting fixtures and Walt the Dreamer—a bronze statue commemorating Walt Disney. The Imagination! pavilion celebrates the concept of imagination and features Journey into Imagination with Figment, a dark ride starring Figment that explores the senses. CommuniCore Hall and Plaza is a multi-use pavilion used for exhibitions, gallery space, a mixology bar, a demonstration kitchen, and music performances, as well as meet-and-greets with Disney characters. The Odyssey Pavilion is an exhibition space during the park's annual festivals.

World Celebration is also home to Creations Shop, the park's main gift shop; Connections Eatery & Cafe, a quick-service restaurant and Starbucks themed to global food history; and Club Cool, a Coca-Cola-themed attraction and shop featuring complimentary samples of Coca-Cola soft drinks from around the world.

=== World Discovery ===
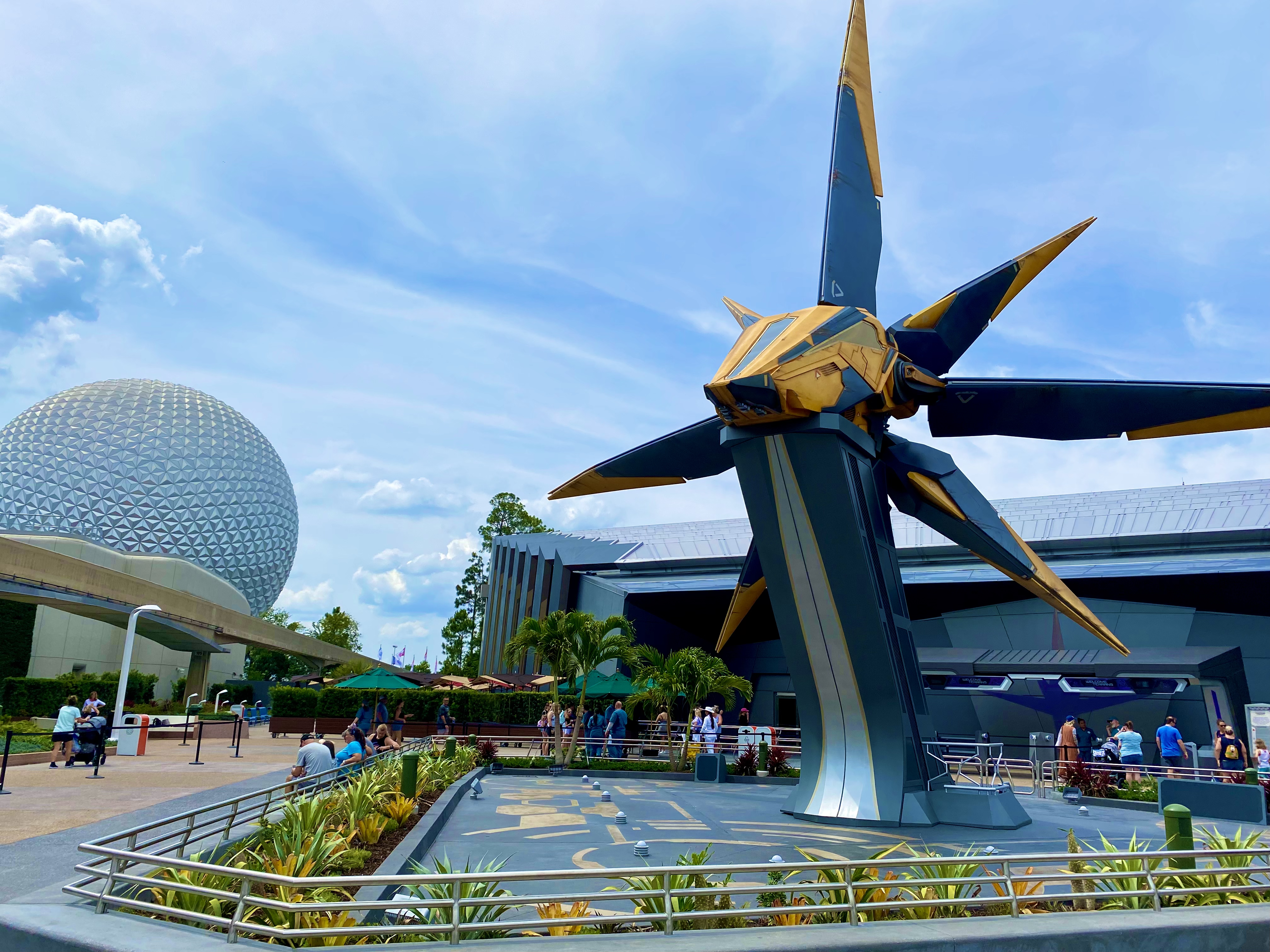
Guardians of the Galaxy: Cosmic Rewind
(formerly Universe of Energy)

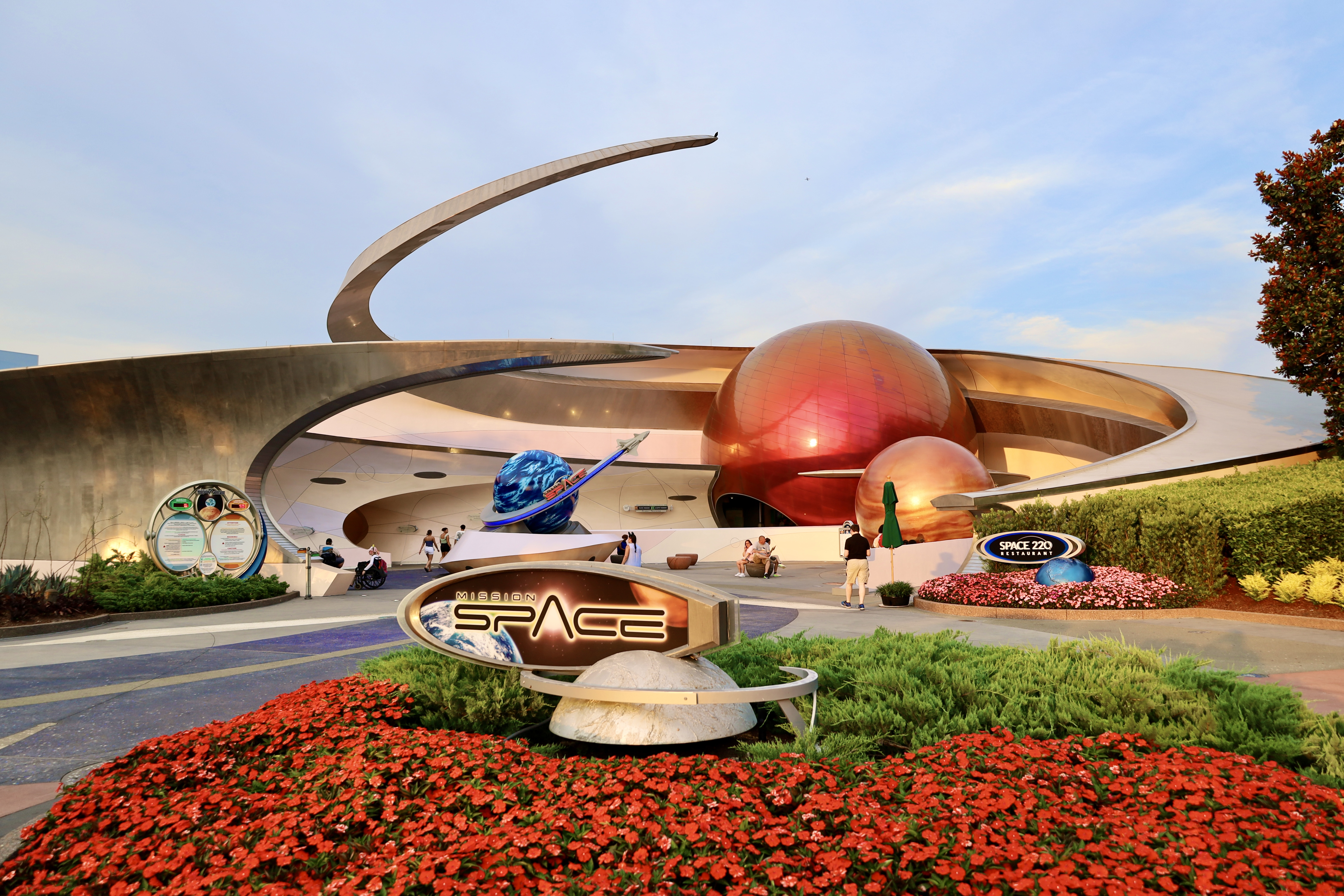
Mission: SPACE
(former site of Horizons)

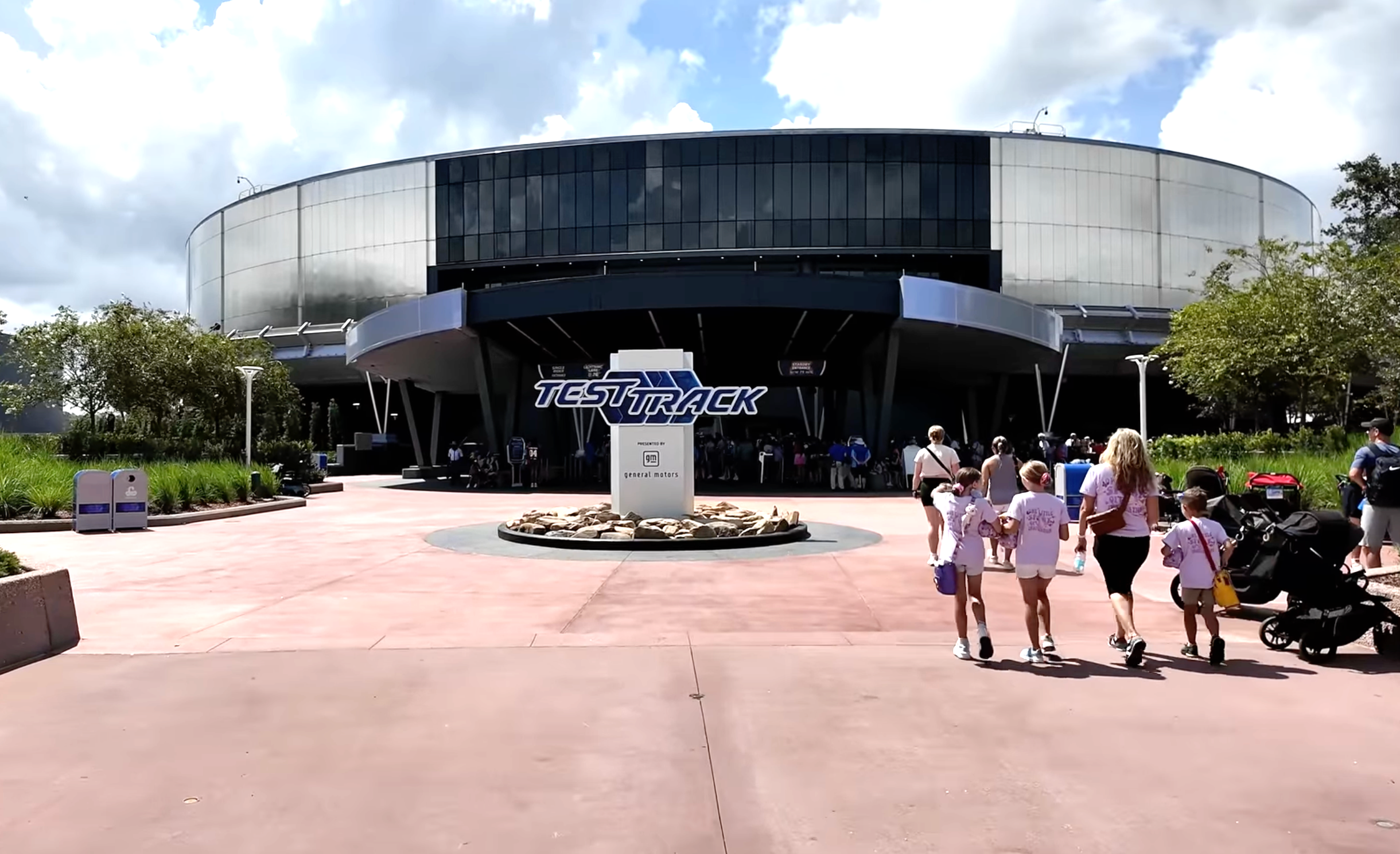
Test Track
(formerly World of Motion)

World Discovery centers on space, science, transportation, and intergalactic exploration. Lying on the east side of World Celebration, the Discovery neighborhood currently features three major pavilions in clockwise layout.

Guardians of the Galaxy: Cosmic Rewind, an enclosed spinning roller coaster based on the superhero team of the same name. The building originally opened as Universe of Energy.

Mission: SPACE is a centrifugal motion simulator thrill ride that replicates a space flight experience to Mars and a low orbit tour over the surface of Earth. Next to it is Space 220, a themed restaurant simulating dining aboard a space station located two hundred twenty miles high above Earth. The building is located on the original plot site of Horizons.

Test Track is a high-speed slot car ride inspired by the automobile testing procedures that General Motors uses to evaluate concept cars. The Motion Pavilion was one of the original pavilions of Epcot and has always housed an attraction sponsored by General Motors.

In between Guardians of the Galaxy: Cosmic Rewind and Mission: SPACE is one standing but unused pavilion that once housed Wonders of Life.

=== World Nature ===
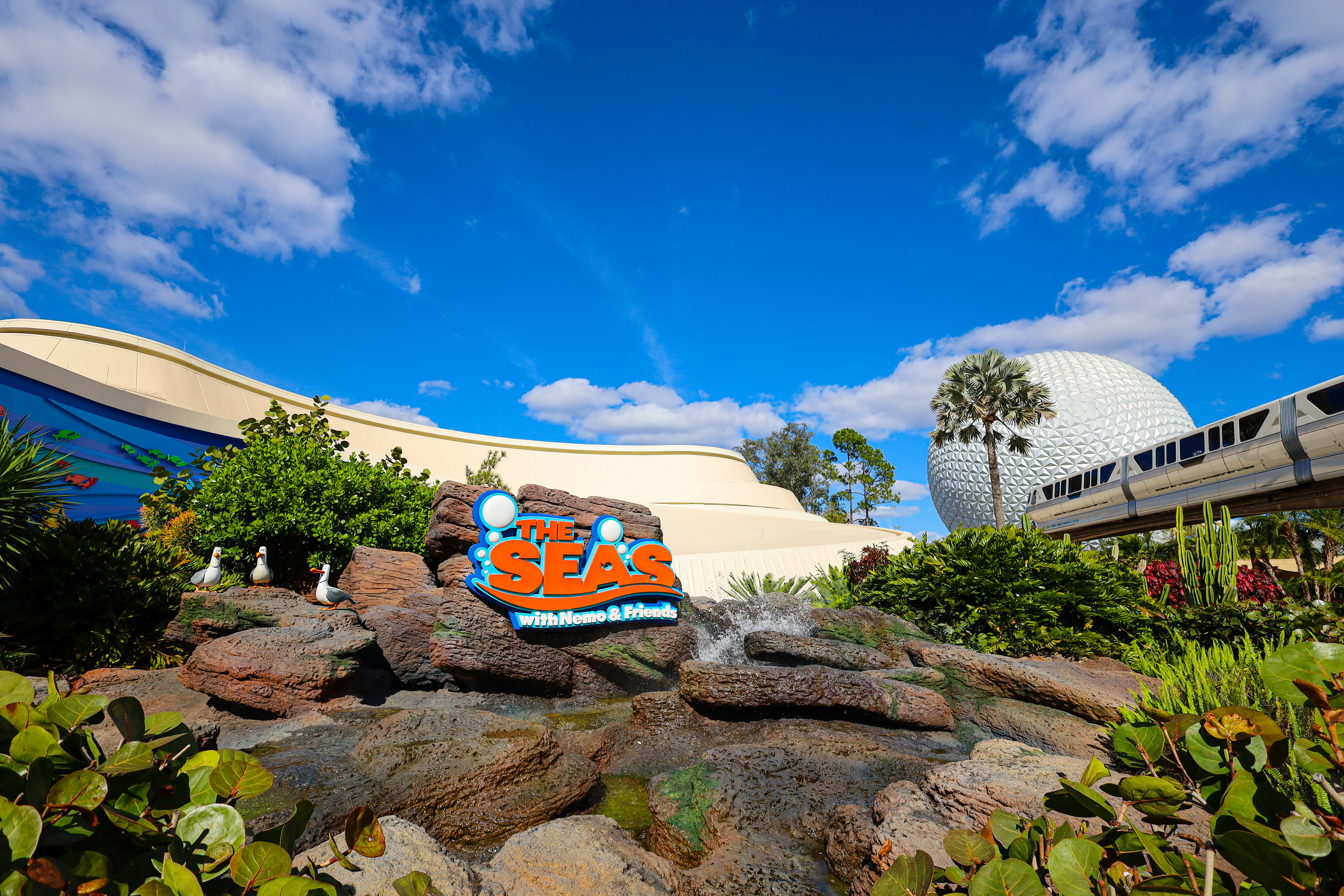
The Seas with Nemo & Friends
(formerly The Living Seas)

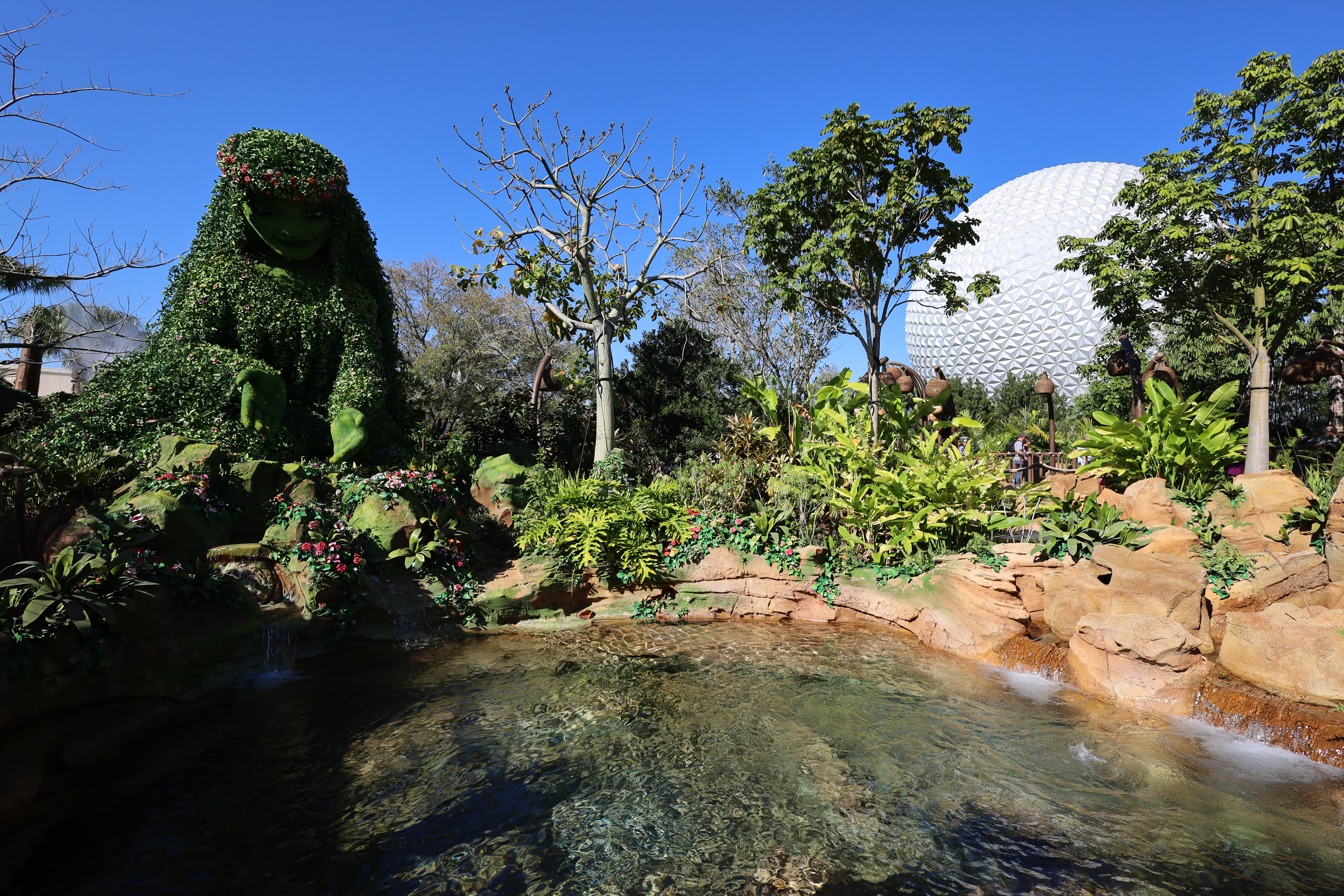
Journey of Water: Inspired by Moana

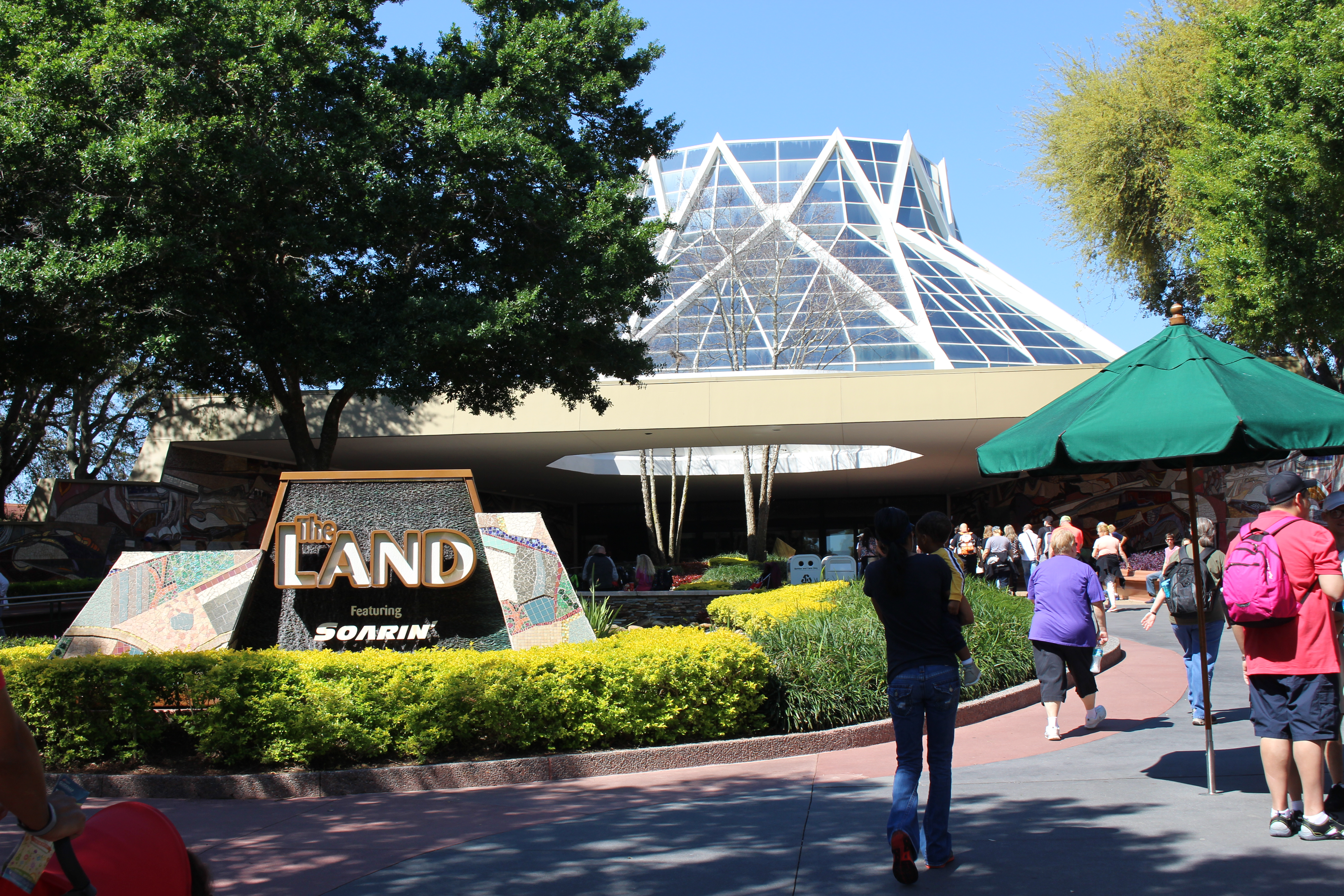
The Land

World Nature focuses on understanding and preserving the beauty, awe and balance of the natural world. Located on the west side of World Celebration, the Nature neighborhood features three major pavilions in counterclockwise layout—inspired by human interaction with the Earth, specifically themes of ocean exploration, hydrology, agriculture, horticulture, ecology, ecotourism, and travel.

Based on ocean exploration and inspired by the Finding Nemo series, The Seas pavilion features the sixth-largest aquarium in the world with marine life exhibits; an Omnimover attraction inspired by Finding Nemo; and Turtle Talk with Crush, an interactive show hosted by Crush from Finding Nemo. Connected to the building is the Coral Reef Restaurant, a themed seafood restaurant that provides views into the aquarium. Nearby is Journey of Water, an outdoor walkthrough water attraction depicting the Earth's water cycle, inspired by Moana. Finally, the Land pavilion features three attractions; Soarin' Across America, an attraction that simulates a hang gliding flight over various regions of the United States; Living with the Land, a narrated boat tour through Audio-Animatronics scenes, a greenhouse and hydroponics lab; and Awesome Planet, a short documentary film presented in the pavilion's Harvest Theater about the Earth's biomes and the perils of climate change.

=== World Showcase ===
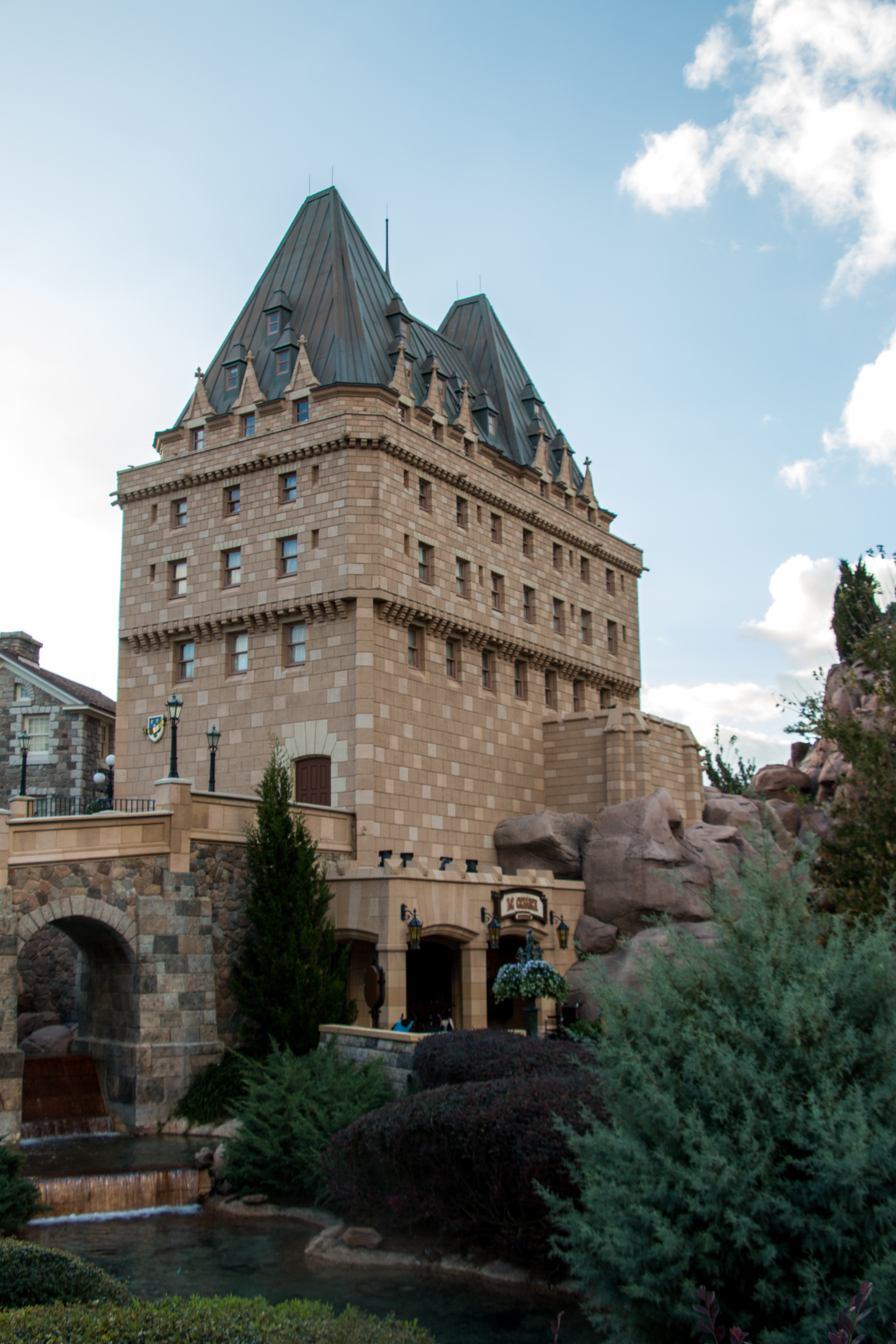
Canada

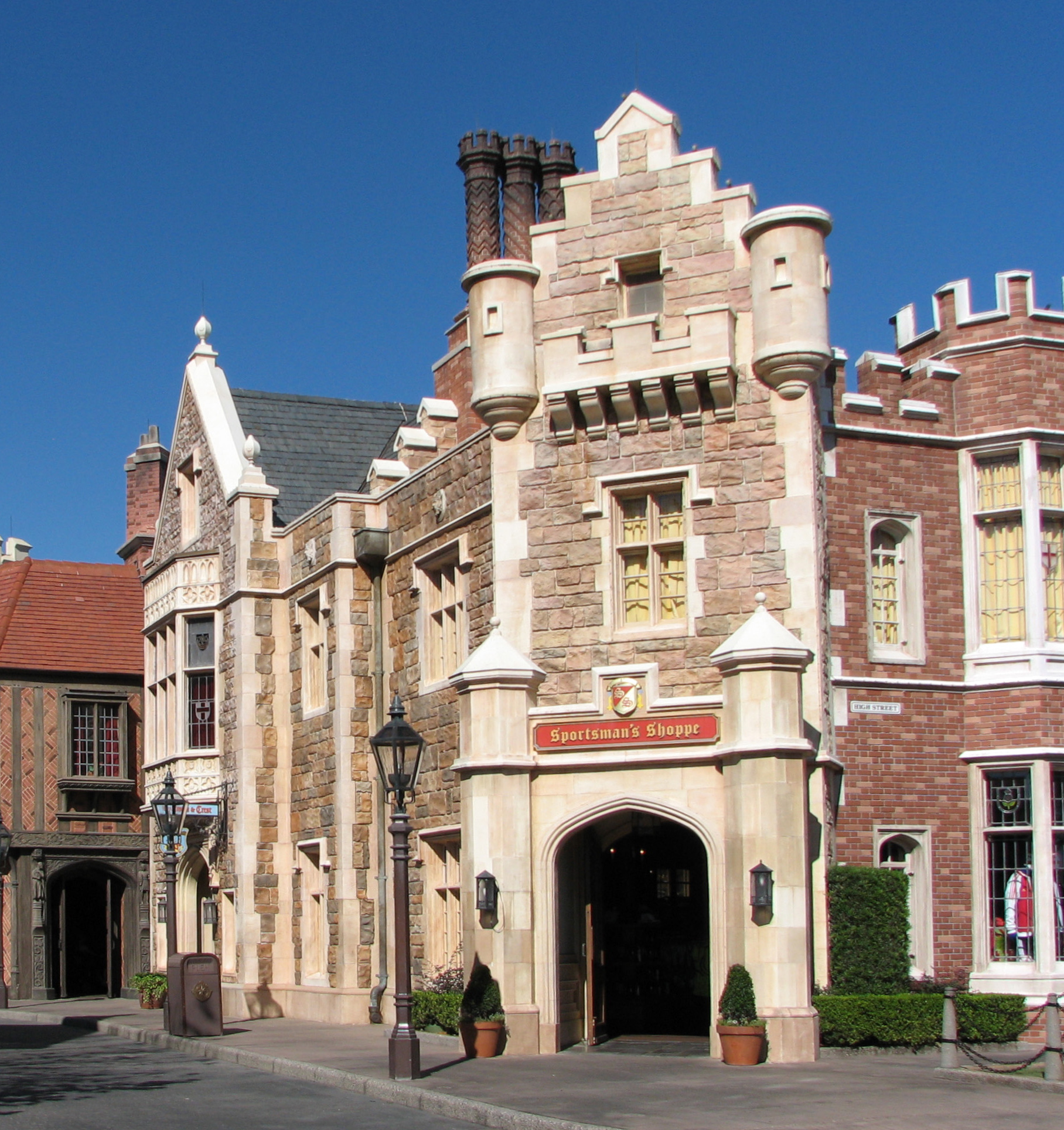
United Kingdom

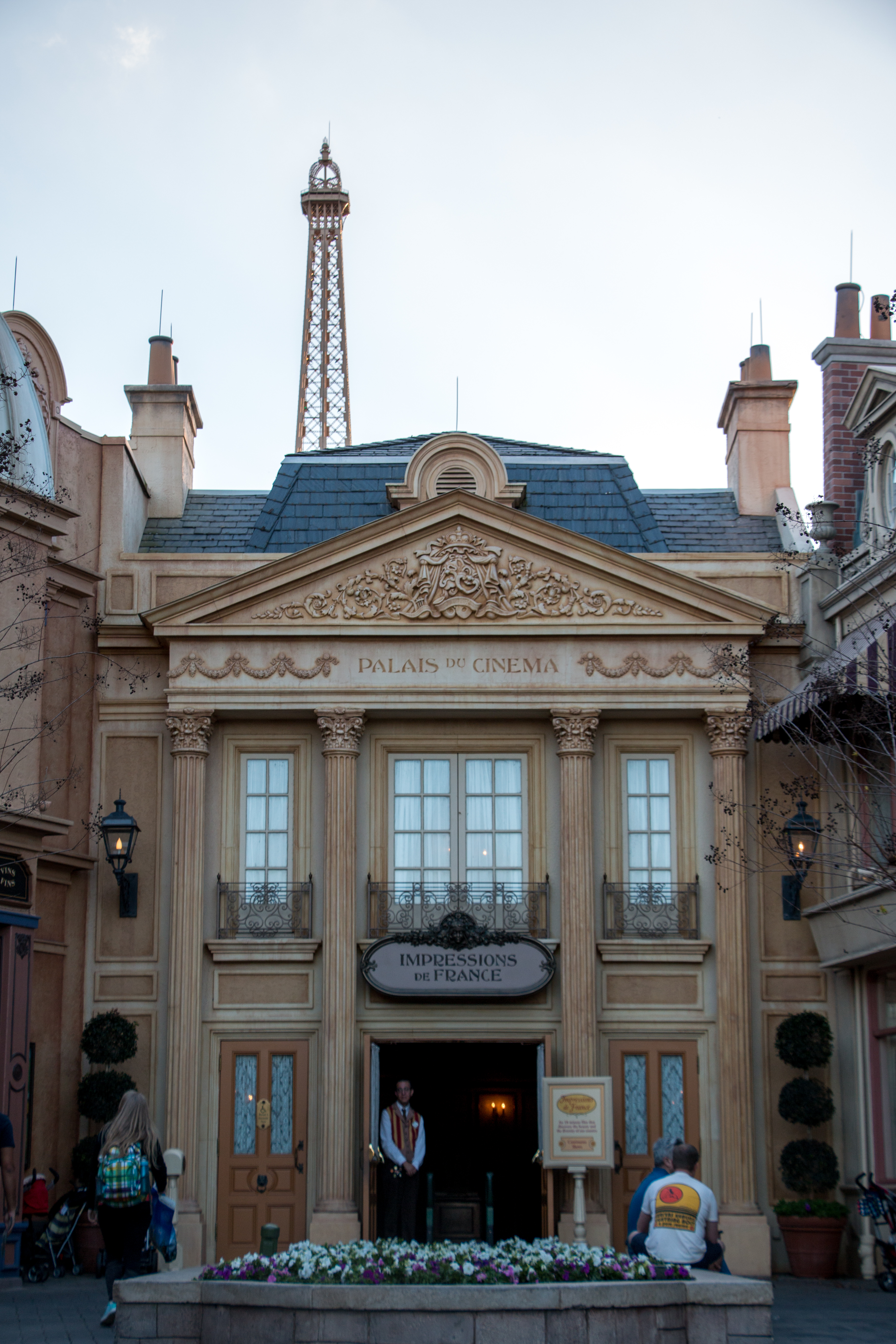
France

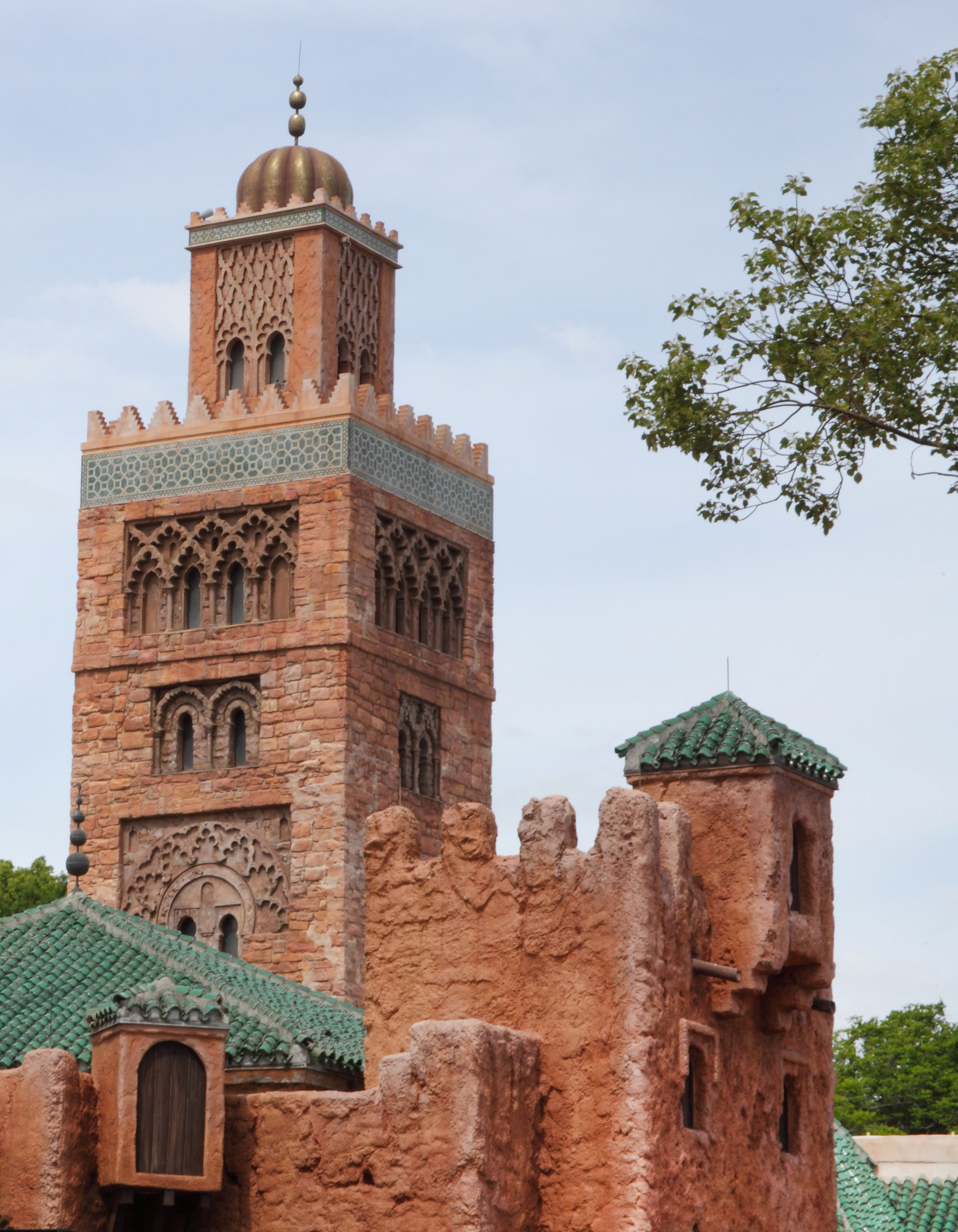
Morocco

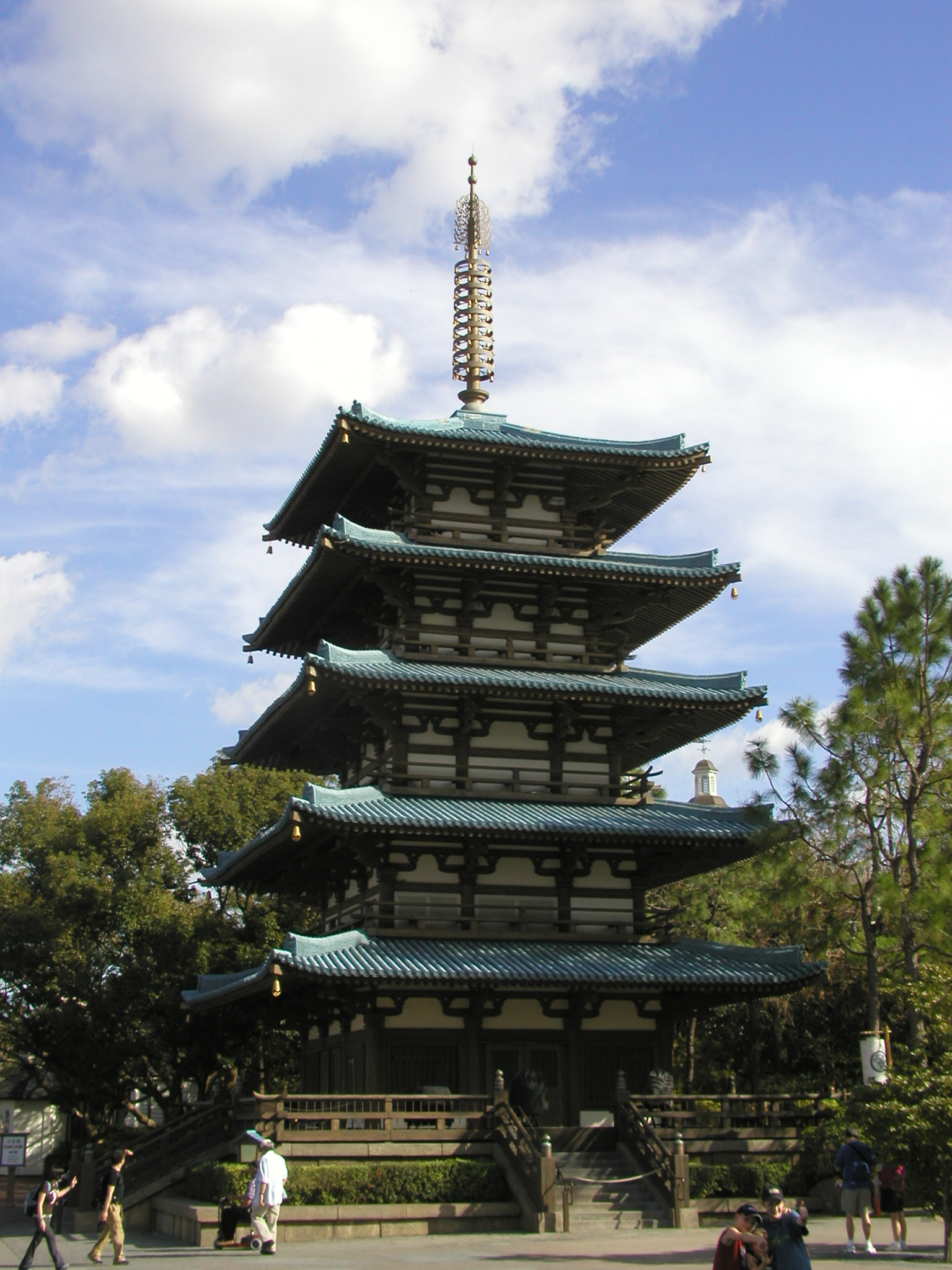
Japan

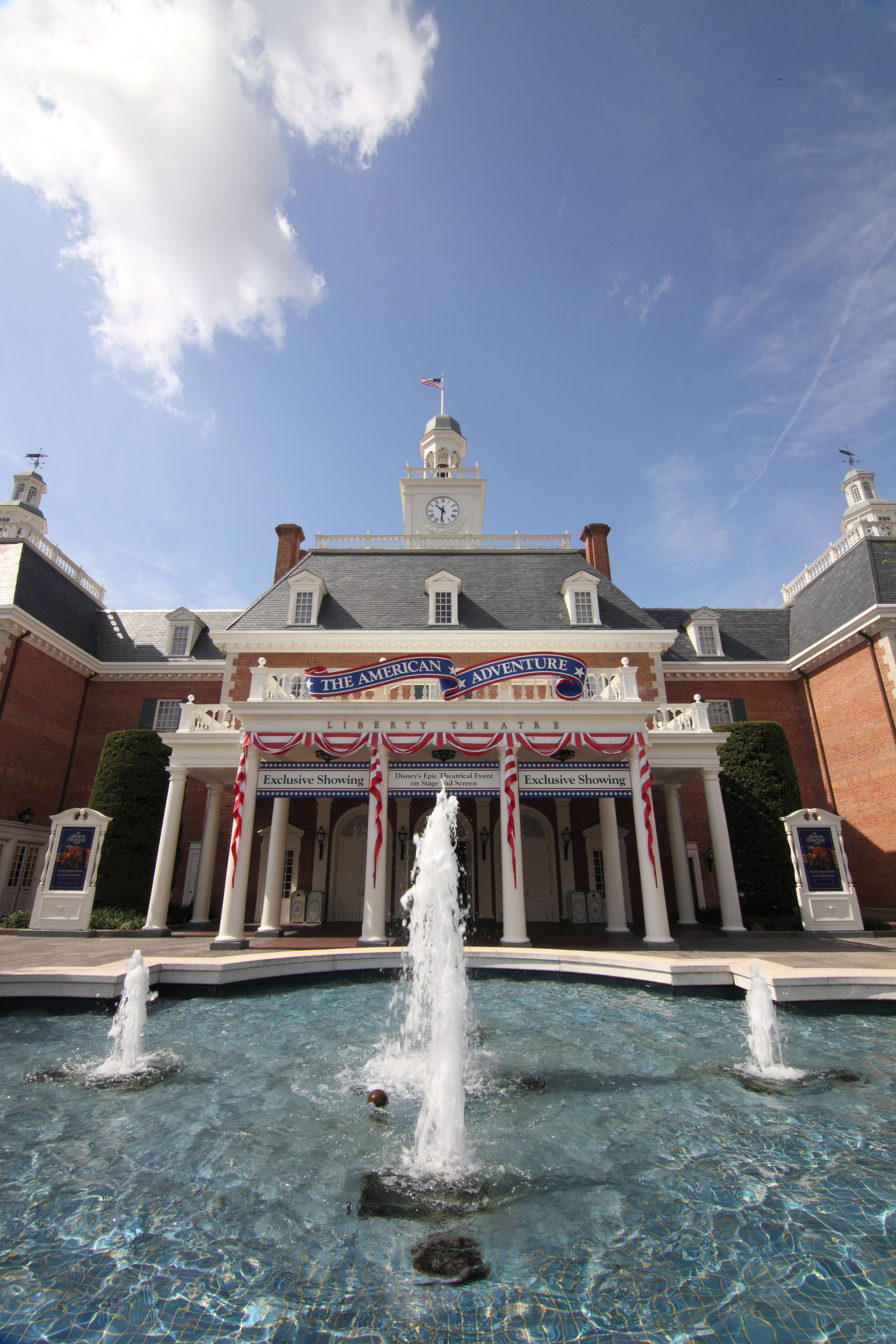
The American Adventure

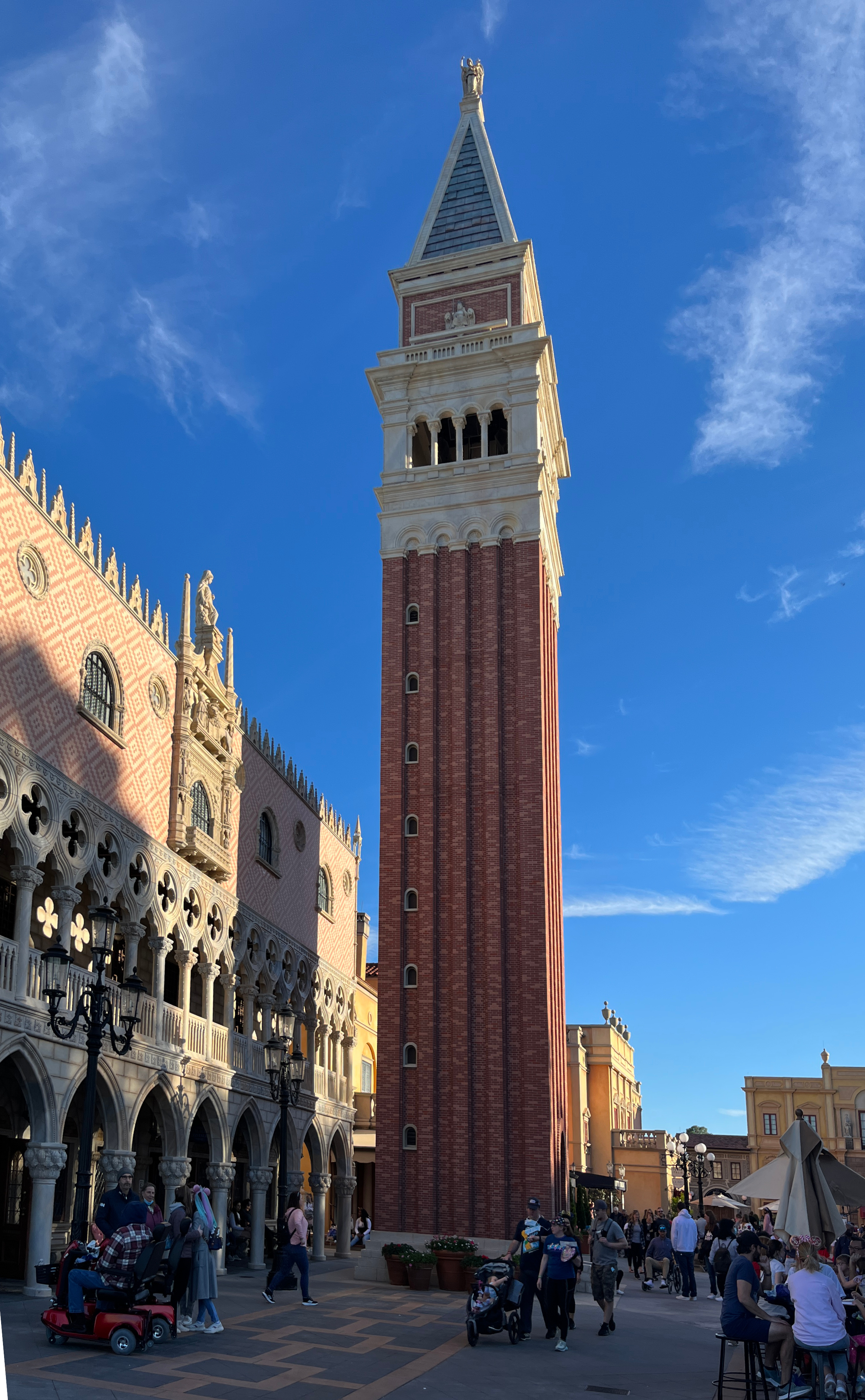
Italy

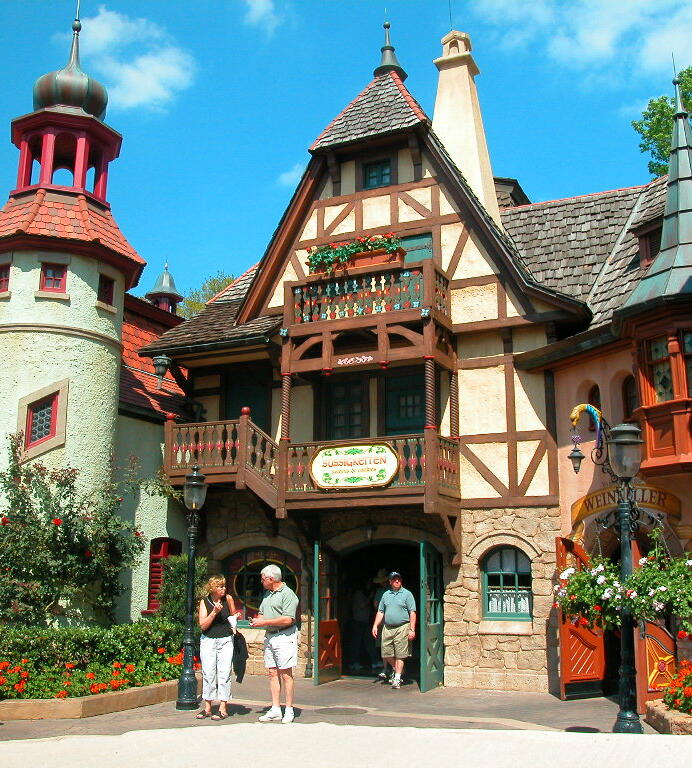
Germany

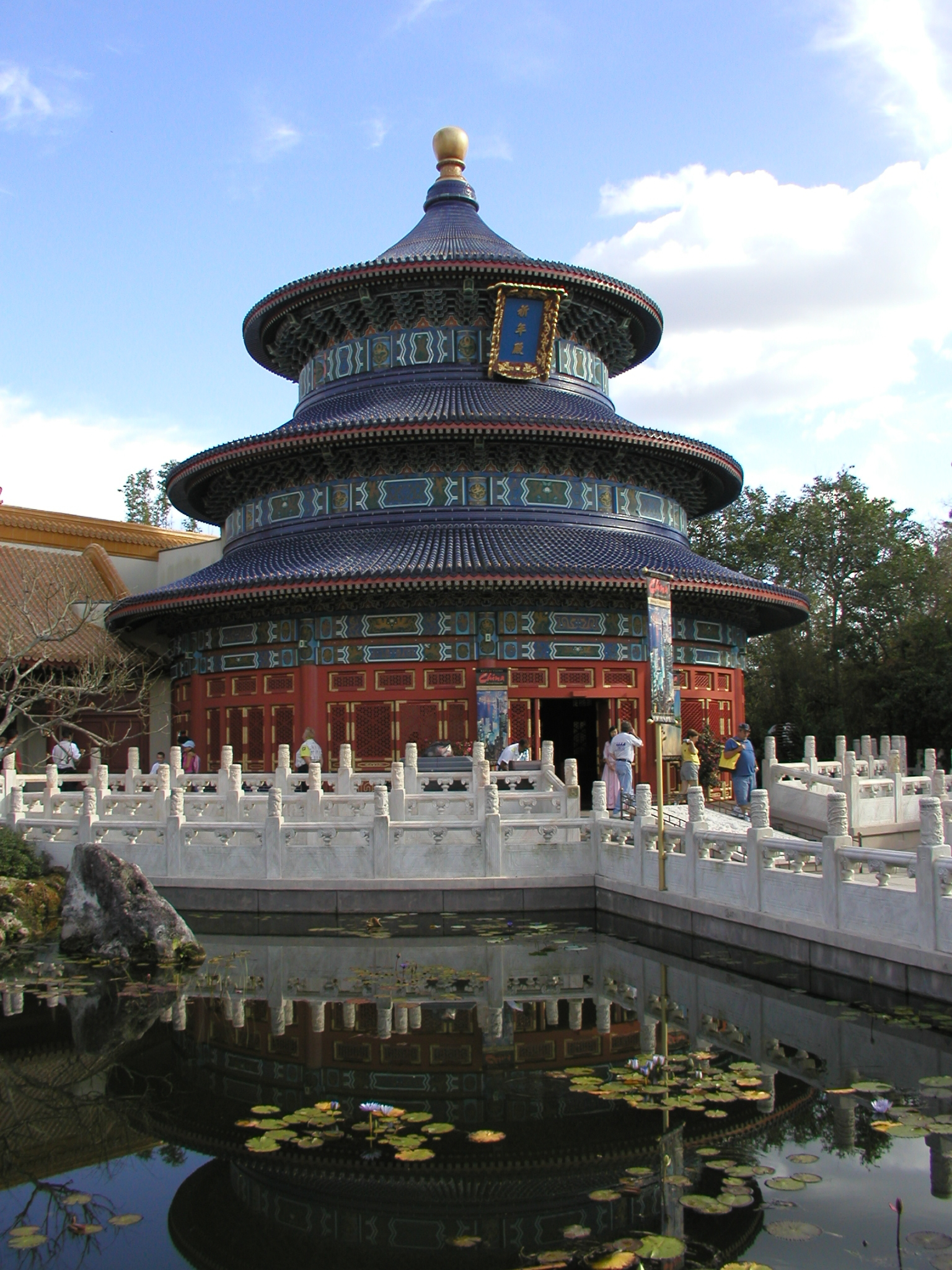
China

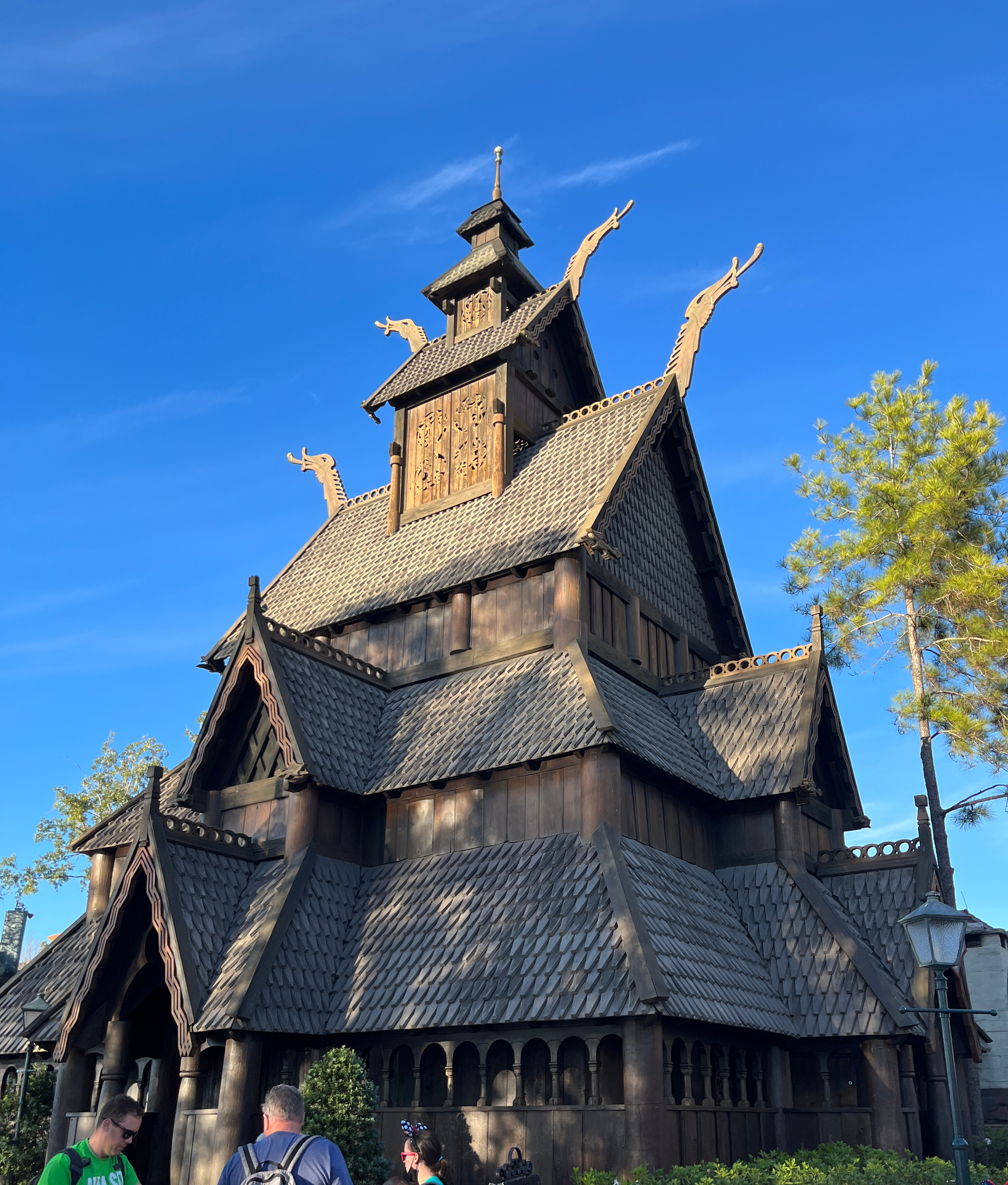
Norway

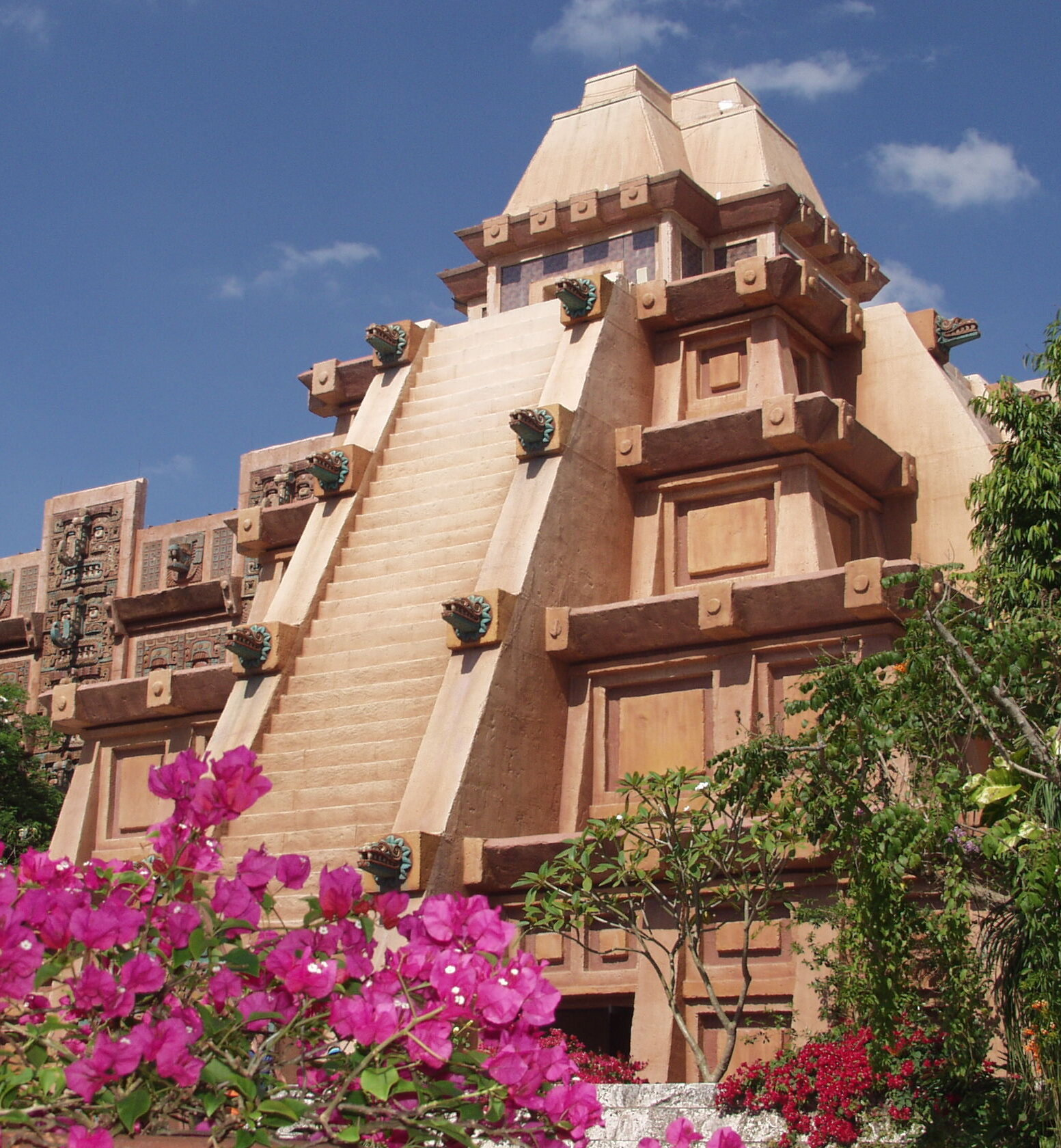
Mexico

World Showcase is the park's largest neighborhood, dedicated to representing the culture, history, cuisine, architecture, and traditions of 11 nations from across four continents—North America, Europe, Asia, and Africa. Each nation pavilion features attractions, shops, restaurants, and landscaping that celebrate or portray authentic settings from each country—several pavilions also contain recreations inspired by existing buildings and landmarks, such as the Eiffel Tower, Itsukushima Shrine, Horyuji Temple, Hampton Court Palace, Château Laurier, Gol Stave Church, St Mark's Campanile, and the Kutubiyya Mosque. Of the 11 pavilions, only Morocco and Norway were not present at the park's opening, as they were added in 1984 and 1988 respectively.

The nation pavilions surround the World Showcase Lagoon, a man-made lake located in the center of World Showcase with a perimeter of 1.2 miles (1.9 km), which is the site of the park's nighttime fireworks display, Luminous: The Symphony of Us. In counter-clockwise order, the 11 pavilions are:

- Canada
- United Kingdom
- France
- Morocco
- Japan
- The American Adventure (United States)
- Italy
- Germany
- China
- Norway
- Mexico

The American Adventure is the host pavilion of World Showcase, sharing its name with its marquee attraction: Liberty Theater, as a stage show detailing American history and hosted by Audio-Animatronics versions of Benjamin Franklin and Mark Twain. The pavilion also includes the American Heritage Gallery, a changing exhibition space. On the shores of the lagoon is the America Gardens Theatre, an outdoor amphitheater that hosts the park's festival concerts.

The France Pavilion hosts Impressions de France in Palais du Cinéma, an 18-minute Cinerama-style film depicting the culture of France, and along with Beauty and the Beast: Sing-Along. Tucked behind the lagoon-facing portion of the pavilion is Remy's Ratatouille Adventure, a 3D dark ride inspired by Pixar’s Ratatouille.

The Canada and China Pavilions each host Circle-Vision 360° films—Canada Far and Wide and Reflections of China—that depict the diverse cultures and countrysides of their respective countries. Two dark boat rides reside within the Norway and Mexico Pavilions—Frozen Ever After and Gran Fiesta Tour Starring The Three Caballeros, respectively—inspired by Frozen and The Three Caballeros.

A secondary park gate is located between the France and United Kingdom pavilions of World Showcase and is known as the International Gateway. The International Gateway is directly accessible to guests arriving from the Disney Skyliner and from watercraft transport, and by walkways from the nearby Epcot Area Resorts and Disney's Hollywood Studios.

Each pavilion contains themed architecture, landscapes, streetscapes, attractions, shops and restaurants representing the respective country's culture and cuisine. In an effort to maintain the authenticity of the represented countries, the pavilions are primarily staffed by citizens of the respective countries as part of Disney's Cultural Representative Program through Q1 visa agreements. Some pavilions also contain themed rides, shows, and live entertainment representative of the respective country. The Morocco pavilion was directly sponsored by the Moroccan government until 2020, when Disney took ownership of the pavilion. The remaining pavilions are primarily sponsored by private companies with affiliations to the represented countries.

Originally, the showcase was to include partnerships with the governments of the different countries. According to Disney's 1975 Annual Report, the Showcase would:

...offer participating countries a permanent installation for such features as themed restaurants and shops, product exhibits, industrial displays, cultural presentations, a trade center, and even special facilities for business meetings.

Major sponsorships for each participating nation will be asked to provide the capital to cover the cost of designing, developing and constructing its attraction and/or ride and all exhibits, as well as the Pavilion itself. It will also have the responsibility for funding the housing for its employees in the International Village. Its land lease will cover the cost of maintaining the attraction for a minimum of ten years.

The Disney organization will be responsible for area development, including the construction of transportation systems and utilities. We will also build and operate the internal people moving system, the Courtyard of Nations and central theater facility.

==== Proposed pavilions and unused locations ====
There are currently seven undeveloped spots for countries around the World Showcase in between the locations of the current countries. Two sites are located on either side of the United Kingdom, one between France and Morocco, one between Morocco and Japan, one between Italy and Germany, and two between Germany and China.

In 1982, Disney announced three pavilions were "coming soon": Israel, Spain and Equatorial Africa, blending elements of the cultures of countries such as Kenya and Zaire. A model of the Equatorial Africa pavilions was also shown on the opening day telecast. However, the pavilions were never built. Instead, a small African themed refreshment shop known as the "Outpost" currently resides in the area between China and Germany, where the Equatorial Africa pavilion was to be located.

More than 50 nations, among them, Brazil, Chile, India, Indonesia, Israel, New Zealand, Saudi Arabia, Sweden and five African countries (Eritrea, Ethiopia, Kenya, Namibia, and South Africa), took part in the Millennium Village, a project that took place in Epcot during Millennium Celebration from 1999 to 2001. The Millennium Village was located inside a temporary structure built behind the United Kingdom pavilions that remains in use as World ShowPlace.

==== Alcohol policy ====
Unlike Magic Kingdom, which up until 2012 did not serve alcohol, most stores and restaurants at Epcot, especially in the World Showcase, serve and sell a variety of alcoholic beverages including specialty drinks, craft beers, wines, and spirits reflective of the respective countries. The park also hosts the Epcot International Food & Wine Festival, an annual event featuring food and drink samplings from all over the world, along with live entertainment and special exhibits.

== Annual events ==
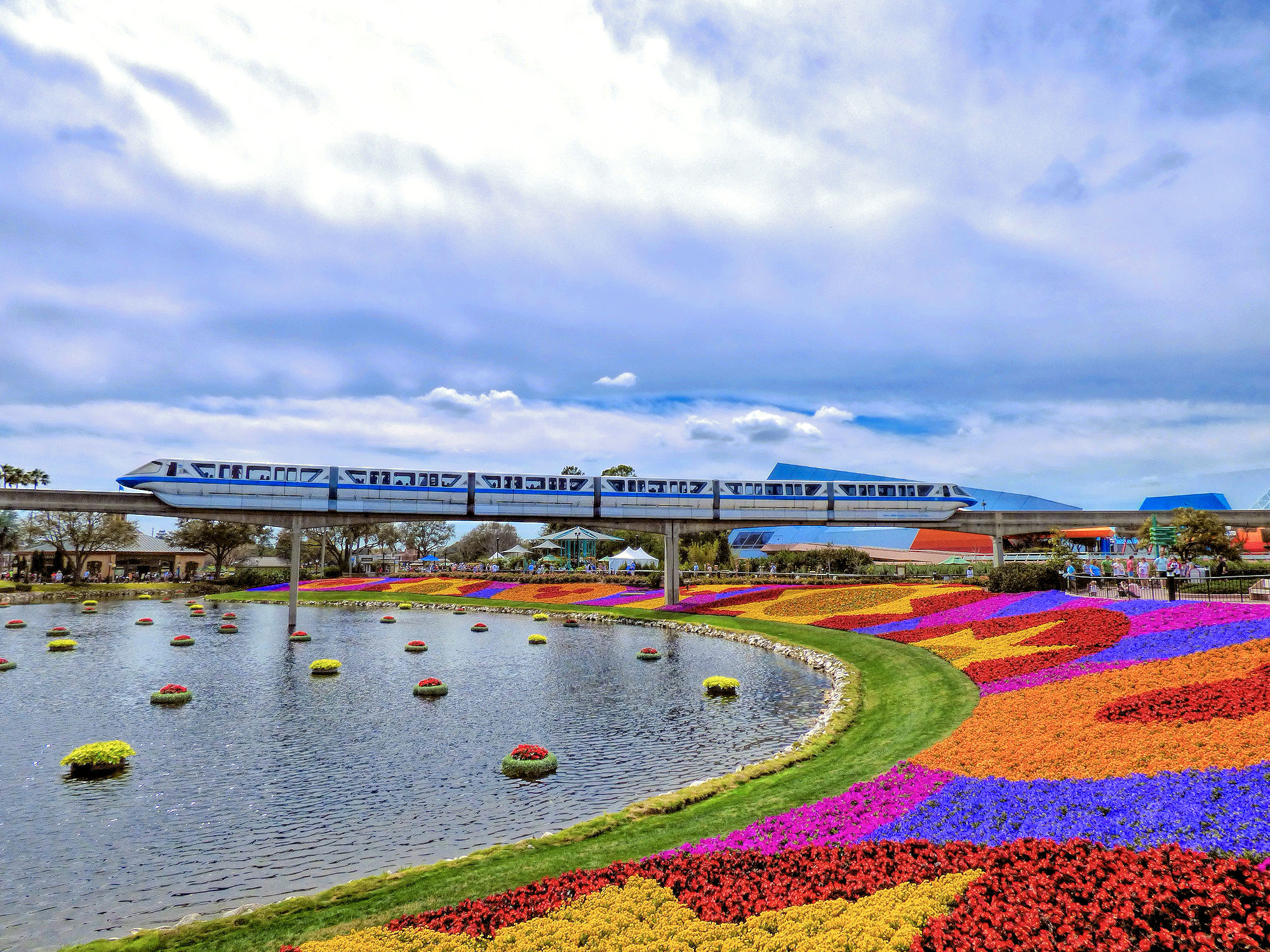
Epcot during the annual Flower and Garden Festival

Epcot hosts a number of special events during the year:

- The Epcot International Flower & Garden Festival, inaugurated in 1994, uses specially-themed floral displays throughout the park, including topiary sculptures of Disney characters. Each event takes more than a full year to plan and more than 20,000 cast member hours.
- The Epcot International Food & Wine Festival, inaugurated in 1995, draws amateur and professional gourmets to sample delicacies from all around the world, including nations that do not have a permanent presence in World Showcase. Celebrity chefs are often on-hand to host the events. In 2008, the festival featured the Bocuse d'Or USA, the American semifinal of the biennial Bocuse d'Or cooking competition.
- The Epcot International Festival of the Arts, inaugurated in 2017, is a festival showcasing visual, culinary, and performing arts. The first annual event took place on weekends from January 13 through February 20, 2017.
- The Epcot International Festival of the Holidays (previously known as Epcot Holidays Around the World from 1996 to 2016), inaugurated in 2017, is the park's annual holiday celebration. The World Showcase pavilions feature storytellers describing their nation's holiday traditions, and three nightly performances of the Candlelight Processional featuring an auditioned mass choir and a celebrity guest narrating the story of Christmas. Kiosks throughout the World Showcase feature holiday dishes. On New Year's Eve, the park offers a variety of additional entertainment including live DJ dance areas throughout the park.

== Attendance ==
The Walt Disney Company generally does not publish attendance figures for its theme parks, so industry groups such as the Themed Entertainment Association estimate these figures.

Year	Attendance (millions)	Ref
2011	10.8	
2012	11.0	
2013	11.2	
2014	11.4	
2015	11.7	
2016	11.7	
2017	12.2	
2018	12.4	
2019	12.4	
2020	4.04	
2021	7.75	
2022	10.0	
2023	11.98	
2024	12.13	
2025	12.109	

== See also ==
- List of Epcot attractions
- Epcot Resort Area
- WestCOT

Preceding station	Walt Disney World Monorail System	Following station
Transportation and Ticket Center Terminus	Epcot Line	Terminus

Preceded by Nashua, NH	Host of FIRST Robotics World Championship; 1995–2002	Succeeded by Reliant Park
