= Gran Fiesta Tour Starring The Three Caballeros =

Amusement ride at Epcot

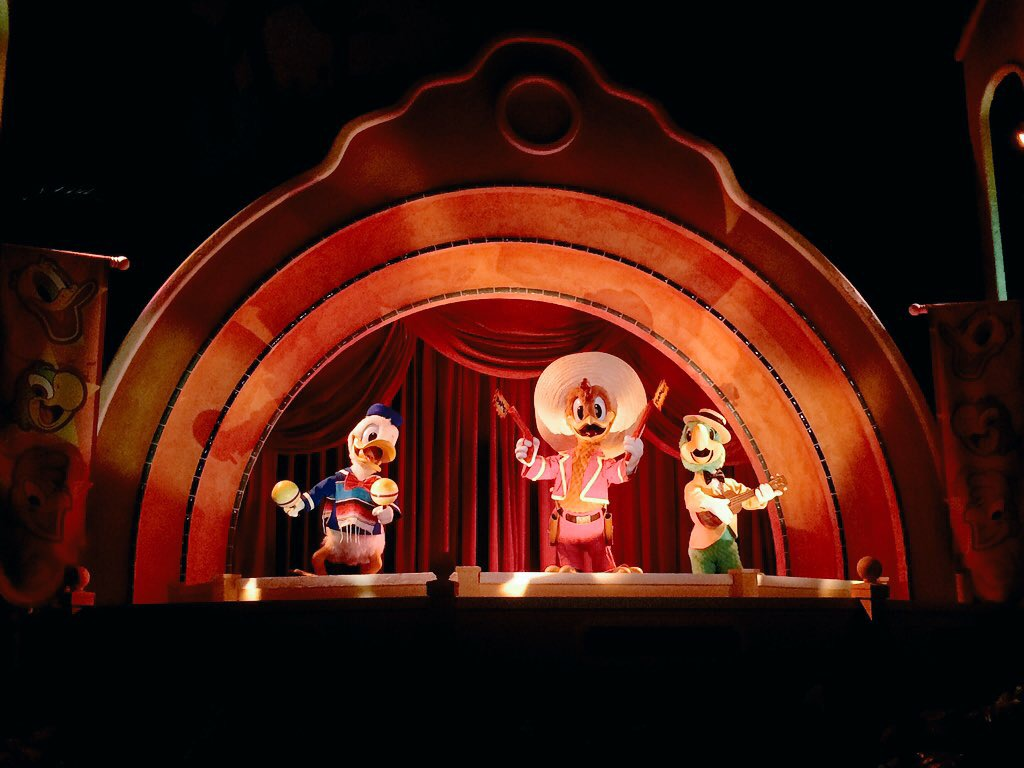
- Donald Duck, Panchito Pistole, and José Carioca performing at the ride's finale.

Epcot
- Area: World Showcase, Mexico pavilion
- Coordinates: 28°22′19″N 81°32′48″W
- Status: Operating
- Opening date: April 6, 2007
- Replaced: El Rio del Tiempo

Ride statistics
- Attraction type: Dark boat ride
- Manufacturer: Arrow Dynamics
- Designer: Walt Disney Imagineering
- Theme: The Three Caballeros
- Music: "The Three Caballeros" by Manuel Esperón (music) and Ray Gilbert (lyrics)
- Capacity: 1,656 riders per hour
- Vehicle type: Boats
- Riders per vehicle: 15
- Rows: 5
- Riders per row: 3
- Wheelchair accessible

Gran Fiesta Tour Starring The Three Caballeros is a musical dark boat ride housed within the pyramid-shaped Mexico Pavilion, at the Epcot theme park at the Walt Disney World Resort in Florida. It was the first World Showcase attraction to feature Disney characters based on an existing property. Norway followed suit in 2014 when it closed its Maelstrom ride to make room for Frozen Ever After, which opened in 2016.

== Synopsis ==
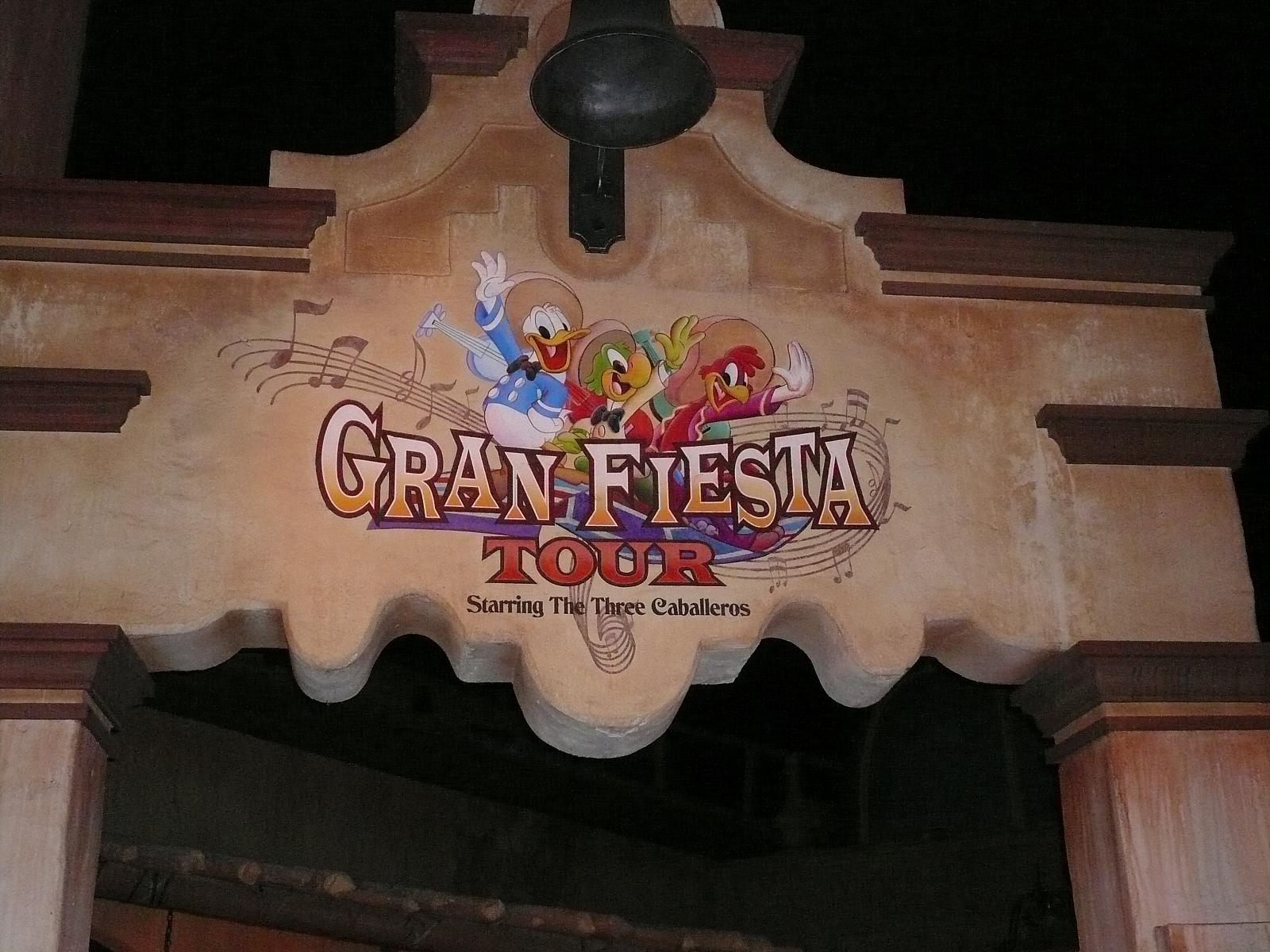
Attraction entrance inside the Mexico pavilion.

The attraction begins with posters indicating that the Three Caballeros are to perform a concert tonight.

After boarding the boats, guests float around the Mayan pyramid and volcano in the back of the pavilion's main room. Soon, guests enter a tunnel on the side of the pyramid, where Panchito Pistoles and José Carioca of The Three Caballeros introduce themselves, only to find out that Donald Duck, the third member of the group, has run off, prompting Panchito and José to set off on a frantic search for their missing friend. The next few scenes show Donald touring Mexico and José and Panchito on a magic serape (a sort of Mexican flying poncho) looking for him.

The next scene has characters similar to 'It's a Small World' with dancing animatronics and a Donald Duck piñata. Once past this area, guests enter a cave, which features different scenes of live-action footage with the Caballeros. After leaving the cave, there are three panels featuring a Mariachi band in the first, some Mexican girls and Donald in the second and Panchito and José pulling Donald away from the girls in the third. From here, guests float into Mexico City, where fireworks are going off overhead and the Three Caballeros are finally performing their concert.

== History ==
The Gran Fiesta Tour replaced El Rio del Tiempo (The River of Time) boat ride that previously was at the Mexico Pavilion from 1982 to 2007.

Panchito, the leader of the trio, is the only Mexican character of the three, as Donald is typically portrayed as American while José is Brazilian.

The attraction's flume system and boats were manufactured by Arrow Dynamics, who also worked on other water-based dark rides for Disney such as It's a Small World and Pirates of the Caribbean.

Eric Goldberg, best known for animating the Genie in Aladdin, directed the animation for the ride.

On December 4, 2015, animatronics of the Three Caballeros from the Mickey Mouse Revue were placed into the attraction's finale to replace projections of these characters.

== Voice cast ==
- Tony Anselmo as Donald Duck
- Rob Paulsen as José Carioca
- Carlos Alazraqui as Panchito Pistoles

== See also ==
- Epcot attraction and entertainment history
- It's a Small World, a similar boat ride, with Disney characters since 2008.
