= Mexico Pavilion at Epcot =

Pavilion of World Showcase in Epcot

Mexico Pavilion

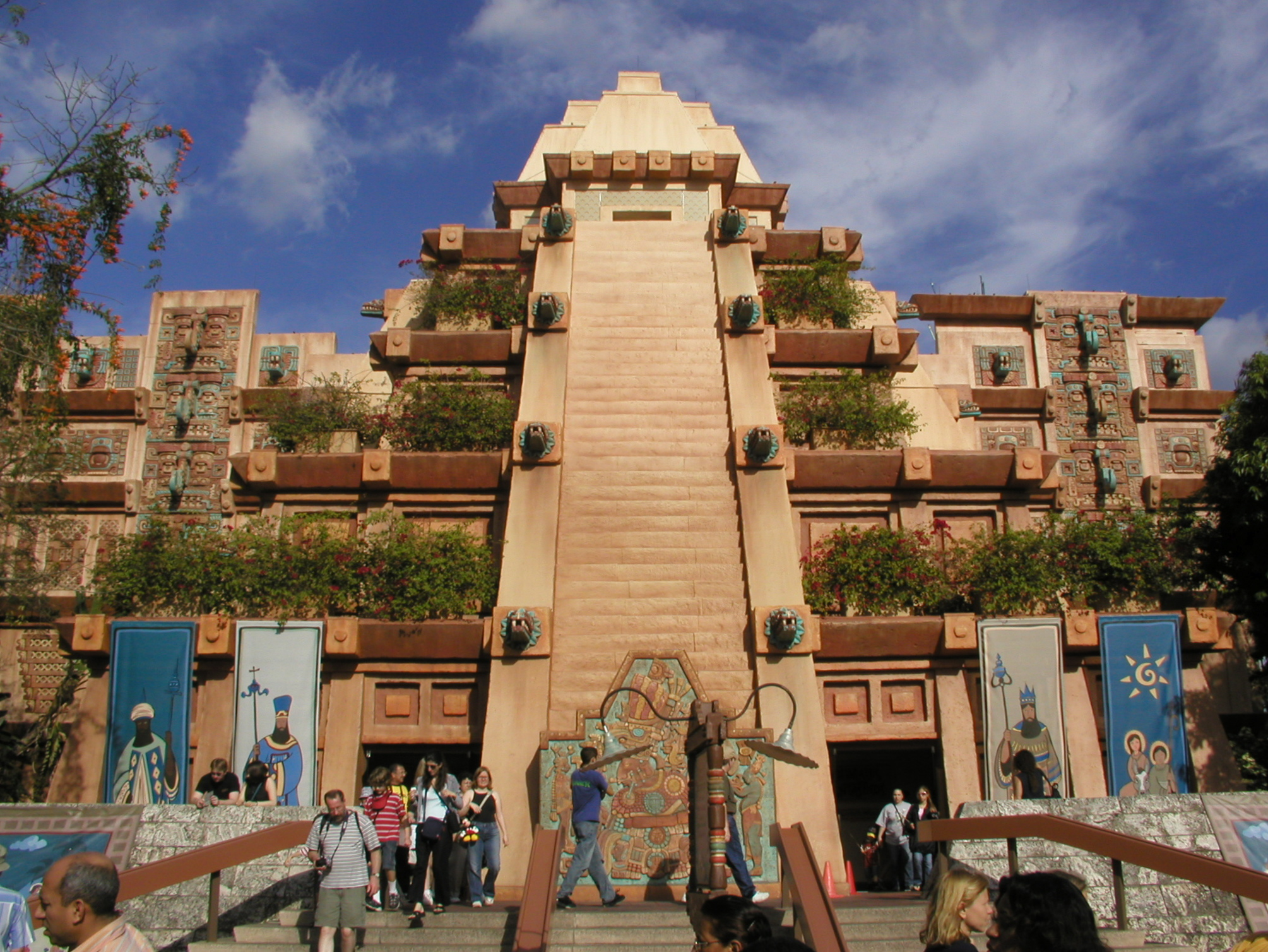
- The main building of the Mexico pavilion

Epcot
- Area: World Showcase
- Coordinates: 28.371436°N 81.547448°W
- Status: Operating
- Opening date: October 1, 1982

Ride statistics
- Attraction type: Themed pavilion
- Theme: Mexican village

The Mexico Pavilion is a Mexican-themed pavilion that is part of the World Showcase within Epcot at the Walt Disney World in Bay Lake, Florida, United States. It is located next to the Norway pavilion.

== Layout ==
The Mexico Pavilion resembles a Mesoamerican pyramid with steps leading to entrance doors. Visitors enter through a gallery display of Mexican artwork, the "Animales Fantásticos" art collection. The central indoor area of the pavilion is themed as an outdoor twilight-lit Mexican village and marketplace, Plaza de los Amigos. At the edge of the plaza, a restaurant, San Ángel Inn Restaurante, overlooks an indoor lagoon with a themed backdrop of another pyramid and a smoldering volcano in the distance with themed lighting and smoke effects. To the side of the plaza, a boarding area leads to a boat ride, Gran Fiesta Tour Starring The Three Caballeros, which commences in the indoor lagoon area.

Due to the location and height of the outdoor structure of the pavilion, the nightly fireworks shows are controlled from a small technical office on top-of the building.

== Attractions and services ==
=== Attractions ===
- Gran Fiesta Tour Starring The Three Caballeros - (2007 – present)
- EPCOT World Showcase Adventure
  - DuckTales World Showcase Adventure - (2022 - present)

==== Former attractions ====
- El Río del Tiempo (The River of Time) - (1982-2007) (replaced by Gran Fiesta Tour in 2007)
- EPCOT World Showcase Adventure
  - Kim Possible World Showcase Adventure - (2009-2012)
  - Agent P World Showcase Adventure - (2012-2020)

=== Dining ===
- San Angel Inn Restaurante - an indoor table-service restaurant located in the central plaza of the pavilion, the restaurant is the sibling of Mexico City's restaurant of the same name, which dates back to 1692
- La Hacienda de San Ángel - a lakeside indoor table-service restaurant, opened in September 2010
- Cantina de San Ángel - a lakeside counter-service location with casual outdoor seating
- La Cava del Tequila - a tequila bar located adjacent to San Angel Inn Restaurante with a vast collection of tequilas, specialty margaritas and light Mexican appetizers, hosted by tequila "connoisseurs" who interact with park guests
- Choza de Margarita - an outdoor margarita bar with a wide variety of frozen margaritas, on-the-rocks margaritas and Mexican snacks

=== Live entertainment ===
- Mariachi Cobre
- Viva Mexico
- Meet Donald Duck

=== Shopping ===
- Plaza de Los Amigos, a Mexican marketplace that sells products such as sombreros, ceramics, musical instruments such as maracas, bajas and The Three Caballeros' merchandise

== See also ==
- Epcot attraction and entertainment history
