= El Rio del Tiempo =

Former dark ride at Epcot

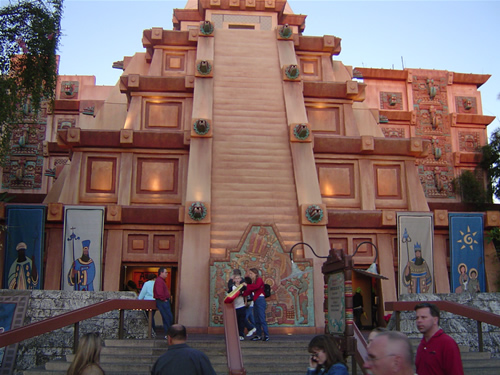
- The outdoor facade of the ride

Epcot
- Area: World Showcase; Mexico Pavilion
- Coordinates: 28°22′19″N 81°32′48″W
- Status: Removed
- Opening date: October 1, 1982
- Closing date: January 2, 2007
- Replaced by: Gran Fiesta Tour Starring The Three Caballeros

Ride statistics
- Attraction type: Boat Canal
- Designer: Walt Disney Imagineering
- Theme: Mexican Mythology and History
- Capacity: 1656 riders per hour
- Vehicle type: Boat
- Riders per vehicle: 16
- Duration: 8:07
- Propulsion: Propulsion Pumps
- Must transfer from wheelchair
- Closed captioning available

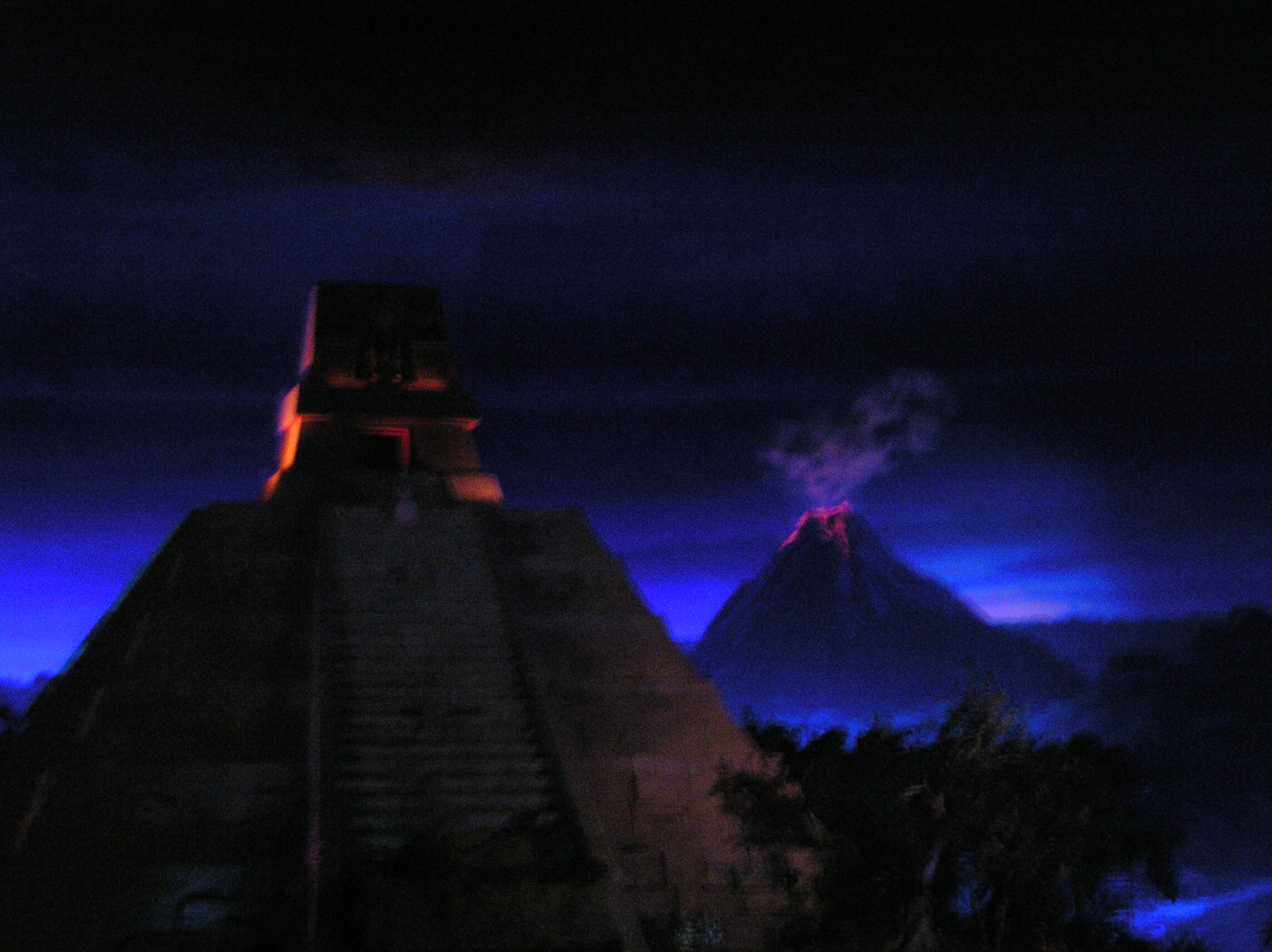
The volcano at the beginning of the ride

El Rio del Tiempo ("The River of Time") was a dark ride housed within the pyramid-shaped Mexico pavilion, in EPCOT Center at Walt Disney World Resort in Lake Buena Vista, Florida. The ride carried passengers on a slow boat ride through various scenes from Mexico's history. The scenes were filled with doll-sized Audio-Animatronic figures clad in authentic folk clothing, singing, dancing and playing music.

== Synopsis ==
The ride began on a quiet river under an evening sky. It passed a volcano and continued on to scenes of native inhabitants. The ride continued with scenes of swimming, jumping into the ocean and relaxing at a bar. It would pass a Mexican shop, where merchants talked directly to the riders and tried to bargain with them. The finale was a fireworks filled night sky in modern-day Mexico City, with oversized marionettes dancing in a carousel.

== Closure ==
El Rio del Tiempo closed on January 2, 2007 and was updated into a new ride titled Gran Fiesta Tour Starring The Three Caballeros in April 2007. The updated ride is based on the characters from the 1944 Disney film The Three Caballeros, including Donald Duck, José Carioca and Panchito Pistoles. The attraction's new story has Panchito and Jose searching for Donald across Mexico. It features much of the same settings as El Rio del Tiempo, and is located in the same place.

== See also ==
- Epcot attraction and entertainment history
