= Demonstration kitchen =

Space for cooking demonstration

A demonstration kitchen, also known as a show kitchen or teaching kitchen, is a culinary space designed for cooking demonstrations, classes, and other food-related events. These kitchens are often equipped with professional-grade appliances, ample counter space, and audiovisual technology to enhance participant's learning experience.

== History ==
The concept of demonstration kitchens can be traced back to the early 20th century, with the rise of home economics education and the growing popularity of cooking shows on radio and television. Early demonstration kitchens were often found in department stores, cooking schools, and community centers, where they served as a platform for promoting new products and educating the public about cooking techniques.

In recent years, demonstration kitchens have experienced a resurgence in popularity, driven by the growing interest in food and cooking and the increasing demand for experiential learning opportunities. Today, demonstration kitchens can be found in various settings, including culinary schools, restaurants, retail stores, and even private homes.

== Uses ==
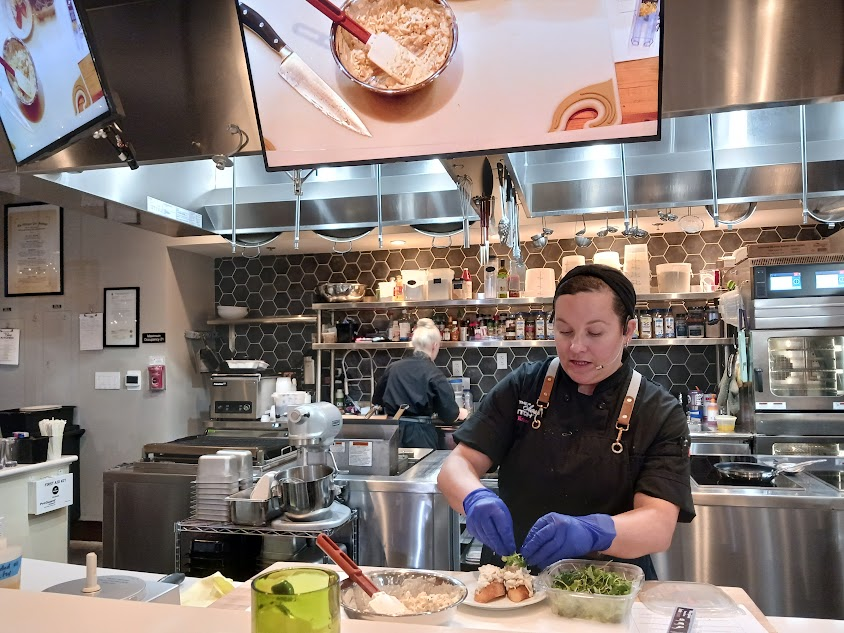
Chef de Cuisine, Kristen Nicoll at The Show Kitchen in The Villages, Florida.

Demonstration kitchens are versatile spaces, serving a multitude of purposes. They are ideal for hosting cooking classes and workshops, where participants can learn anything from basic cooking skills to specialized techniques like baking, pastry-making, or international cuisine. Manufacturers and retailers often utilize demonstration kitchens to showcase new products, offering samples to potential customers and generating excitement around their brands. These kitchens also provide a unique setting for corporate events and team-building activities, fostering employee camaraderie through cooking classes and competitions. Additionally, demonstration kitchens can be rented out for private events like birthdays, anniversaries, and corporate gatherings, adding culinary twists to celebrations.

== Benefits ==
The benefits of demonstration kitchens extend to both participants and hosts. Participants enjoy a hands-on learning experience, observing cooking techniques up close and often getting the chance to participate in food preparation. The interactive nature of these kitchens increases engagement, making learning about food and cooking more enjoyable and memorable. For businesses, hosting events in a demonstration kitchen can significantly enhance brand awareness and cultivate customer loyalty. Additionally, these kitchens can generate revenue through cooking classes, product demonstrations, and private events.
