= List of Epcot attractions =

Epcot attraction and entertainment history

Epcot is a theme park located at the Walt Disney World Resort. The term "attractions" is used by Disney as a catch-all term for rides, shows, and exhibits.

== World Celebration ==
=== Current attractions ===
- Spaceship Earth is an eighteen-story-tall geodesic sphere, located at the front entrance of Epcot. The ride tells the history of communication, with a focus on the development of cultures and the future of technologies.
  - Project Tomorrow: Inventing the Wonders of the Future is an interactive post-show following Spaceship Earth showcasing many "virtual reality" games.
- Imagination! is a pavilion that contains attractions that highlight imagination.
  - Journey into Imagination with Figment is a ride that encourages guests to use their senses and their imagination.
  - ImageWorks: The What-If Labs is an interactive post-show following Journey into Imagination.
  - Magic Eye Theater
    - Disney & Pixar Short Film Festival is a 3D show composed of three animated shorts.
- Odyssey Events Pavilion is a flex space building in World Celebration near World Showcase.
- Dreamers Point is a location of World Celebration, accessed from Spaceship Earth, which discover live entertainment as CommuniCore Plaza, festival experiences as CommuniCore Hall, lush gardens as World Celebration Gardens and a statue of Walt Disney as Walt the Dreamers

=== Entertainment ===
- JAMMitors, trashcan percussion band that plays daily.
- CommuniCore Plaza Stage
  - ¡Celebración Encanto! (which means Encanto Celebration! in Spanish) is a musical stage show retelling the story of the film and features Mirabel Madrigal and Bruno Madrigal in CommuniCore Plaza Stage.
  - La Calle (The Streets) is a live band, which alluding to this group being inspired by street bands, in the addition of a new evening performance, after the musical stage show, ¡Celebración Encanto! in CommuniCore Plaza Stage. The group was includes three musicians, a singer, and a dancer, while the musicians and singer perform Latin American music on stage, the dancer encourages guests on the ground to dance.

== World Discovery ==
=== Current attractions ===
- Mission: Space is a centrifuge-based ride that simulates the training required to be a member of the space program.
- Test Track (Presented by General Motors) is a high-speed ride that shows guests the wonders of modern car technology
- Wonders of Xandar is a pavilion that contains the first other-world showcase based on the Guardians of the Galaxy series of films.
  - Guardians of the Galaxy: Cosmic Rewind is a roller coaster inspired by Marvel's Guardians of the Galaxy films.

== World Nature ==
=== Current attractions ===
- The Land is a pavilion that contains attractions that detail how we interact with our natural environment.
  - Harvest Theater
    - Awesome Planet is a 4D film about the Earth's biomes and the perils of climate change, with narration by Ty Burrell.
  - Living with the Land takes visitors on a boat tour through a working greenhouse.
    - Living with the Land: Merry and Bright Nights (seasonal; 2019–2021)
    - Living with the Land: Glimmering Greenhouses (seasonal; 2022–)
  - Soarin' is a hang glider simulator that "flies" over a variety of scenes. The primary version of the attraction, "Soarin' Across America", debuted in 2026. However, the original version, "Soarin' over California", is presented on a seasonal basis.
- The Seas is one of the largest aquariums in the world.
  - The Seas with Nemo & Friends is a ride chronicling Nemo's epic journey, featuring projection technology that makes it appear as though Nemo, Dory, and Marlin are swimming with the live fish.
  - Turtle Talk with Crush is an interactive show starring Crush, the Sea Turtle, from Disney/Pixar's Finding Nemo and Finding Dory.
- Journey of Water is a water walk-through attraction inspired by Disney's animated feature film Moana.

=== Past entertainment ===
- Inspiration Gardens
  - Forces of Nature is a live show debuted in Inspiration Gardens, as part of World Celebration Gardens, which near the locations of World Nature, features aerial acrobatic performers representing Mother Nature and different elements.

== World Showcase ==
=== Current attractions ===
- EPCOT World Showcase Adventure
  - DuckTales World Showcase Adventure

- Mexico
  - Gran Fiesta Tour Starring The Three Caballeros is a boat ride adventure with Panchito Pistoles, José Carioca and Donald Duck.

- Norway
  - Frozen Ever After is a boat ride based on Disney's Frozen.

- China
  - Circle-Vision 360
    - Reflections of China (2003–present) is a Circle-Vision 360° movie exploring China's history and scenery.
- The Outpost is a small Africa-themed area that acts as an unofficial World Showcase Pavilion and includes shopping and refreshments.

- Germany
  - Germany Model Train Display is a small model train layout that features a display of a city and tunnels around the layout's two loops. This is the only attraction in the pavilion until the opening of The American Adventure's Christmas Tree Layout.

- Italy

- The American Adventure
  - Liberty Theatre
    - The American Adventure is a stage show about American history using Audio-Animatronics.
  - Model Train Display (Christmas season only): A model train layout that circles around a tall Christmas tree

- Japan

- Morocco

- France
  - Palais du Cinéma (Cinema Palace)
    - Impressions de France (Impressions of France) is a panoramic movie which visits many of France's cities and historical structures.
    - Beauty and the Beast Sing-Along is a film based on Disney's Beauty and the Beast reliving the songs from the classic movie.
  - Remy's Ratatouille Adventure is a ride based on Disney/Pixar's Ratatouille.

- United Kingdom

- Canada
  - Circle-Vision 360
    - Canada Far and Wide

=== Current entertainment ===
==== Fireworks Shows ====
- World Showcase Lagoon
  - Luminous The Symphony of Us (December 5, 2023 – present)

==== Live and Musical Entertainment ====
- Italy
  - Sergio, juggler
- The American Adventure
  - Liberty Theatre
    - Voices of Liberty, a cappella choir singing traditional American songs
- Japan
  - Matsuriza, Taiko drummers
- United Kingdom
  - The British Revolution, a British rock band playing hits from the '60s to the early '90s

=== Past World Showcase attractions ===
- Mexico
  - El Rio del Tiempo (The River of Time) (1982–2007), was a boat ride that shows many aspects of Mexican life, history, and celebrations.
- Norway
  - Maelstrom (1988–2014), was a boat ride into Norway's past and present.
- Canada
  - Circle-Vision 360
    - Portraits of Canada, this film from Expo 86 in Canada was played temporarily instead of "O Canada"
    - Canada 67
    - O Canada! (1982–2007), the Circle-Vision 360° film was updated in 2007.
    - O Canada! (2007–2019), was a Circle-Vision 360° that was succeeded by Canada: Far and Wide.
- China
  - Circle-Vision 360
    - Wonders of China (1982–2003), the Circle-Vision 360° film was updated in 2003.
- Millennium Village (1999–2000), a large building built for the Millennium Celebration with many small attractions that represent countries not in World Showcase.
- EPCOT World Showcase Adventure
  - Kim Possible World Showcase Adventure (2009–2012)
  - Agent P World Showcase Adventure (2012–2020)

=== Former entertainment ===
==== Fireworks Shows ====
- World Showcase Lagoon
  - Carnival de Lumiere (premiered October 23, 1982)
  - A New World Fantasy (premiered June 1983)
  - Laserphonic Fantasy (June 9, 1984 – January 24, 1988)
  - IllumiNations (January 30, 1988 – September 20, 1996)
  - Holiday IllumiNations (1994–1998) (seasonal)
  - IllumiNations 25 (A) (September 21, 1996 – May 18, 1997)
  - IllumiNations 25 (B) (May 19, 1997 – January 31, 1998)
  - IllumiNations (98) (February 1, 1998 – September 21, 1999)
  - IllumiNations: Reflections of Earth (October 1, 1999 – September 30, 2019), previously "IllumiNations 2000: Reflections of Earth", created for the Millennium Celebration, ended on September 30, 2019, to make way for a new fireworks show called Epcot Forever.
  - Epcot Forever (October 1, 2019 – March 13, 2020; July 1 – September 28, 2021; April 3 – December 4, 2023)
  - Harmonious (October 1, 2021 – April 2, 2023)

==== Daytime Shows ====
- World Showcase Lagoon
  - Skyleidoscope (1985–1987) Planes were launched from the Epcot Center Ultralight Flightpark.
  - Surprise in the Skies (1991–1992)
- The American Adventure
  - America Gardens Theater
    - The Magical World of Barbie (1994–1995)

==== Parades ====
- Tapestry of Nations (October 1, 1999 – September 9, 2001), a parade created for the Millennium Celebration
- Tapestry of Dreams (2001–2003), a refurbished version of Tapestry of Nations replacing the Sage of Time, the parade's original host/narrator with three Dreamseekers

==== Live and Musical Entertainment ====
Acts with * are no longer performing

- Mexico
  - Mariachi Cobre, mariachi band
- Norway
  - Spelmanns Gledje*, Norwegian folk music
- China
  - Si Xian*, traditional Chinese music played on authentic instruments
  - Dragon Legend Acrobats*, group of young Chinese acrobats
  - Jeweled Dragon Acrobats, group of young Chinese acrobats
- Germany
  - Oktoberfest Musikanten, dinner theater
- Italy
  - Lou E. G.*, mime, comedian, magician, street performer
  - Rondo Veneziano*, Electronic Classical Music Group
  - Nova Era*, Electronic Classical Music group (now at Downtown Disney)
  - Imaginum A statue Act* Living statue act
- The American Adventure
  - Spirit of America Fife & Drum Corps
  - American Vybe*, contemporary a cappella group performing American R&B, Jazz, and Swing
- Japan
  - Miyuki*, candy artist
- Morocco
  - MoRockin*, Arabic rhythms fused with rock n' roll
  - Restaurant Marrakesh, Traditional Moroccan music and dance inside restaurant
- France
  - Serveur Amusant, the comical waiter
- United Kingdom
  - The British Invasion*, a '60s British rock-and-roll revival
  - The Hat Lady, pianist in the Rose 'n Crown Pub
  - Jason Wethington, Magician, appearing at the Rose and Crown Pub
  - The World Showcase Players*, a comedic troupe of bumbling Shakespearean actors
- Canada
  - Off Kilter*, a Celtic and Canadian rock band

== EPCOT celebrations ==
- Millennium Celebration (1999–2000), this included:
  - A Mickey Mouse hand holding a wand over Spaceship Earth with the text "2000" (wand then changed to say "Epcot"; 1999–2007)
  - Millennium Central: a rethemed area in front of the Fountain of Nations. Includes the Pin Station.
  - IllumiNations 2000: Reflections of Earth, the new nightly fireworks show. Its name was changed to IllumiNations: Reflections of Earth after the Millennium Celebration.
  - Tapestry of Nations (1999–2001): a new parade about unity and world peace featuring large puppets.
  - Millennium Village (1999–2000): a large building with many small attractions that represent other countries that are not in World Showcase.
- 100 Years of Magic (2001), part of the Walt Disney World Resort celebration.
  - Tapestry of Dreams (2001–2002), a refurbished version of Tapestry of Nations replacing the Sage of Time, the parade's original host/narrator with three Dreamseekers.
- 25th Anniversary (October 1, 2007): included a re-dedication of the park, presentations by Marty Sklar, an exhibit showing the history of EPCOT, fan gatherings, and was concluded by a special IllumiNations: Reflections of Earth which added an extra few minutes of fireworks. Classic Epcot songs ranging from We've Just Begun to Dream from opening day to Celebrate the Future Hand in Hand from the Millennium Celebration were played around the entrance and around the park all day.
- Wheel of Fortune at Walt Disney World (October 10, 2017 – February 16, 2018): A road show of Wheel took place between 2017 and 2018.
- The World's Most Magical Celebration (2021–2023), part of the Walt Disney World Resort's 50th Anniversary celebration.
- Disney 100 Years of Wonder (2023), part of The Walt Disney Company's centennial celebration.

== Retired features ==
=== Past Future World attractions ===
| Name | Opening & closing date | Description | Current attraction | Notes |
|---|---|---|---|---|
| Wheel of Fortune Live | 2017–2018 | A game show taping of Wheel of Fortune at the park. It was ended in 2018 to make way for the World Showcase update. | World Showcase Update | Hosted by Pat Sajak and Vanna White. Located between Test Track (in World Discovery) and Journey into Imagination with Figment (in World Celebration). |
| Wonders of Life | 1989–2007 | The pavilion was devoted to health and body related attractions. It also housed the motion simulator ride, Body Wars, Epcot's first thrill ride. It is located inside a golden colored dome between Mission: SPACE and the Universe of Energy. | Closed | From 2007 to 2018 the space was used for special events; attractions within have remained closed and partially removed. Wonders of Life was intended to be replaced by the PLAY! Pavilion in 2021, however this project was later canceled. |
| The Living Seas | 1986–2005 | The concept of the building was to take visitors under the ocean to 'Sea Base Alpha'. They would then disembark into the main exhibit area where they could interact with various multimedia displays. | The Seas with Nemo & Friends | It was changed dramatically after the 2006 rehab. The queue, Hydrolators, The Seas film and Seacab ride were removed for a theme based on Finding Nemo, and the attraction renamed The Seas with Nemo & Friends, which became part of The Seas Pavilion in World Nature. |
| Horizons | 1983–1999 | Guests visiting the pavilion were advised that "If we can dream it, we can do it." Featuring a series of scenes incorporating Audio-Animatronics figures in futuristic endeavors and its vision of how the future might develop technologically | Mission: Space | The building was later demolished in 2000 and the site is now home to Mission: Space (in World Discovery). |
| Journey into Imagination | 1983–1998 | The pavilion housed various attractions, the centerpiece being Journey into Imagination, an Audio-Animatronics ride that taught you about your imagination and how to use it. | Imagination! | Although the premise has stayed the same, the pavilion has been renamed and all of the original attractions have been removed (in World Celebration). |
| Magic Journeys | 1983–1986 | A 3D art film that takes guests through the world of a child's eye. | Disney & Pixar Short Film Festival | This attraction was replaced by Captain EO before it returned to Walt Disney World in the Magic Kingdom theme park in 1987. |
| Universe of Energy | 1982–1996 | The original attraction featured numerous films that presented information on the subject of energy in a serious fashion as well as a ride through a primeval diorama complete with animatronic dinosaurs. | Guardians of the Galaxy: Cosmic Rewind | Following a 21 year run hosting the show Ellen's Energy Adventure, the Universe of Energy pavilion was gutted in 2017 to make way for Guardians of the Galaxy: Cosmic Rewind (in World Discovery). |
| World of Motion | 1982–1996 | It was a whimsical look at the history and achievements in transportation ranging from cavemen having to use foot power, the invention of the wheel, Leonardo da Vinci's plans for gliders and flying machines, Christopher Columbus setting sail for America, and the first automobiles. | Test Track | The World of Motion building was kept to house a replacement attraction, Test Track (in World Discovery). |
| CommuniCore | 1982–1994 | The pavilion served as EPCOT Center's version of Main Street, U.S.A., as it brought together nearly all of the sponsors in the surrounding pavilions under one roof to serve as a supplemental experience to the overall visit to Future World. | Innoventions | The pavilions reopened as Innoventions in 1994 when all new exhibits were installed. The east side currently houses the Creations Shop, Club Cool, Connections Café, and Connections Eatery in World Celebration. The west side was demolished in 2019 to make space for CommuniCore Plaza and CommuniCore Hall in World Celebration, as well as Journey of Water in World Nature. |
| The Land | 1982–present | It explored how humans can both use the land for their benefit, and how they can also destroy it. Future Technology in better preserving the land was also explored in the pavilion, along with a focus on the celebration of the land itself. | Various Attractions | Although the building and the focus has largely stayed the same, the initial attractions with the exception of Living with the Land were all removed by 1995 (in World Nature). |

=== Other past attractions ===
| Name | Pavilion | Opening & closing date | Description |
|---|---|---|---|
| Innoventions | Innoventions East | 1994–2019 | A walk-through museum that housed exhibitions of emerging technologies. It currently houses Connections Café and Connections Eatery in World Celebration. |
| Innoventions | Innoventions West | 1994–2015 | An asymmetrical copy of the Innoventions East building. It was demolished in 2020 and the site is now home to Journey of Water in World Nature, as well as CommuniCore Hall and CommuniCore Plaza in World Celebration. |
| Circle of Life: An Environmental Fable | The Land | 1995–2018 | A Lion King themed movie that explained symbiosis. |
| Symbiosis | The Land | 1982–1995 | A 70mm film about symbiosis presented in The Land's Harvest Theater. |
| Food Rocks | The Land | 1994–2004 | A musical revue based on "Kitchen Kabaret" and parodying famous pieces of rock music. The show has since been replaced by Soarin’. |
| Kitchen Kabaret | The Land | 1982–1994 | An opening-day musical revue featuring personified, anthropomorphized items of food realized through Disney's Audio-Animatronics. Replaced by Food Rocks, which was a modernized update of the same concept. |
| Ellen's Energy Adventure | Universe of Energy | 1996–2017 | A show and ride about energy and how people generate and harvest it. The show is named for its star, Ellen DeGeneres. It also starred Bill Nye 'The Science Guy' and Alex Trebek. It closed on August 13, 2017, to make way for Guardians of the Galaxy: Cosmic Rewind in World Discovery. |
| Honey, I Shrunk the Audience! | Imagination! | 1994–2010 | A 3D show that was part of the Honey, I Shrunk the Kids franchise. It closed in June 2010 to make way for the return of Captain EO. |
| Captain EO | Imagination! | 1986–1994; 2010–2015 | A 3D show starring Michael Jackson as a commander of a crew of misfits. It originally closed in 1994, but came back for a second stint after Michael Jackson's death as a tribute before being closed permanently on December 6, 2015. It was replaced by Disney & Pixar Short Film Festival. |
| Journey into YOUR Imagination | Imagination! | 1999–2001 | This version of the ride removed Dreamfinder and downplayed Figment's role. The ride was more closely tied to the film Honey, I Shrunk the Audience! (which played in the pavilion's Magic Eye Theater), by re-theming the ride as a trip to the Imagination Institute and casting Eric Idle as his character from the 3D film. Reception of this version of the ride was highly negative, and after only 2 years of operation, the attraction closed for another refurbishment. |
| Millennium Village | World ShowPlace | 1999–2001 | The centerpiece of Disney's Millennium Celebration. The 60,000-square-foot (5,600 m^{2}) pavilion opened up its doors to the public on October 1, 1999, and was closed down on January 1, 2001. It is, however, used on occasion. Along with the Odyssey Restaurant, the Millennium Village (now named "World ShowPlace") is used in the Epcot Food and Wine Festival. |

=== Past Future World entertainment ===
- Fountain of Nations (Original: 1982–1992/Refurbished: 1993–2019), an elaborate fountain that performed to music every 15 minutes. Shows were presented in no particular order and included music by John Tesh, Yanni, and from Disney movies such as The Rescuers Down Under and The Rocketeer.
  - Splashtacular (1993–1994) – A show that debuted in 1993 and included the Fountain of Nations and ended a few months later. The attraction was closed due to the water from the fountain blowing onto the stage, soaking the performers and the guests. It also would cause the walkways to get very crowded, making it hard for people to get through.
- EPCOT Computer Central, an area in CommuniCore that featured two shows:
  - The Astuter Computer Revue (1982–1984), presented by Sperry Corporation.
  - Backstage Magic (1984–1994), a show about how computers controlled park operations around Walt Disney World. Presented by Unisys.
- Disney Vision Adventure: In Virtual Reality, a show that took place in Innoventions about how Disney movies are made using CGI technology featuring Iago from Aladdin.
- Future Corps was a drum and bugle corps band which entertained guests with a high energy instrumental show. The group performed at Epcot from 1982 to 2006.
- Future World Brass, a high energy brass and percussion ensemble that performed at Epcot from 1982 to 2000.
- Wheel of Fortune Live, Tapings of Wheel of Fortune were held near the World Showcase entrance.

== See also ==
- List of Disney theme park attractions
- List of lands at Disney theme parks
- List of Magic Kingdom attractions
- List of Disney's Hollywood Studios attractions
- List of Disney's Animal Kingdom attractions
