= Disney Parks Christmas Day Parade =

Annual parade broadcast

- The official logo for the Disney Parks Christmas Day Parade used from 2009 to 2013.
- Also known as: Disney Parks Magical Christmas Celebration
- Presented by: Various
- Country of origin: United States
- Original language: English/Spanish

Production
- Production location: Walt Disney World

Original release
- Network: ABC (English); Telemundo (Spanish)
- Release: December 25, 1983 – present

The Disney Parks Christmas Day Parade is an American television special that airs on Christmas Day annually on ABC, airing live and taped, primarily inside the Magic Kingdom theme park at Walt Disney World in Orlando, Florida, on select days approximately one month prior to Christmas Day.

Past shows have included segments from the three other Walt Disney World theme parks (Epcot, Disney's Hollywood Studios and Disney's Animal Kingdom), water parks and other entertainment areas, as well as the original Disneyland and Disney California Adventure, and all the overseas Disney parks - Tokyo Disneyland, Tokyo DisneySea, Disneyland Paris, Hong Kong Disneyland and Shanghai Disneyland. Other segments of the annual broadcast included Walt Disney Studios, Disney Adventures, Disney Institute and Disney Cruise Line. The program has aired annually since 1983, except for the year 2000, when Disney aired Walt Disney World 'Twas The Night Before Christmas, a Santa tracking special featuring parade excerpts that aired in primetime on Christmas Eve.

== Description ==
The parade goes down Main Street, U.S.A. It features appearances of Disney characters, including Mickey Mouse, Minnie Mouse, Goofy, Donald Duck, Daisy Duck, Pluto, Scrooge McDuck, and Chip 'n' Dale, as well as floats featuring celebrities, musical performances, marching bands from various schools and community groups across the US, and highlights of events and properties at Disney theme parks and other Disney productions, in addition to those of the other components of the Walt Disney group (like Star Wars, Marvel Studios and Pixar) that are featured in the event. Like the Macy's Thanksgiving Day Parade, it concludes with the arrival of Santa Claus and one of the most anticipated highlights every year is seeing Walt Disney's iconic Babes in Toyland soldiers from the 1961 film.

Currently, most of the program is taped in November (in the 2000s, even until early December) for broadcast on Christmas Day. However, until the early 1990s, the parade was broadcast live on Christmas Day on CBS, with whom Disney had partnered for Thanksgiving and New Year celebrations as well. In 1996, the program moved to ABC after Disney bought the network through its acquisition of Capital Cities/ABC that year. The parade continued to broadcast live on ABC on Christmas Day with another show recorded two days earlier for international use and/or as a back-up in case of weather issues.

The recorded segments of the parade show feature highlights of the activities through the Walt Disney Company including motion pictures, television, home entertainment and streaming, music, cruises, world tours, and the newest attractions and resort hotels slated for future launches in its various resort locations in the United States and around the world.

Starting in 2016, the Disney/ABC family of networks have aired companion specials in the weeks leading up to the parade. That year, The Wonderful World of Disney: Magical Holiday Celebration and Disney Parks Descendants Magical Holiday Celebration aired November 24 on ABC and November 25 on Disney Channel respectively, featuring many of the same personalities as the Christmas parade, tying into the Descendants TV-movie franchise. Some segments and performances in that year's Christmas parade were even recycled from the two earlier specials. The following year, Freeform announced that they would not only air the second Magical Holiday Celebration after its original airing on ABC, but premiere a new hour-long special entitled Decorating Disney: Holiday Magic, which goes behind the scenes of the Disney parks' holiday festivities. This move coincides with the channel's popular 25 Days of Christmas event expanding to many of the other Disney-owned networks. The Disney Channel special from the parks, now titled Disney Parks Presents a Disney Channel Holiday Celebration, also returned for the 2017 holiday season. To reflect the huge part played in the production of the event, beginning in the parade of 2017, the prerecorded holiday greetings that air during the broadcast have been made not just by talents from both Walt Disney Pictures and the Disney Channel and the online streaming service Disney+, but also from the ABC Network, Marvel Studios, Lucasfilm, the Muppets and other entities owned and operated by The Walt Disney Company in the United States and around the world. Usually, the parade opens with the opening message from the CEO of Walt Disney welcoming television viewers to the broadcast, this was a tradition that began in 2002.

The special has been carried by the American Forces Network. Telemundo has aired Spanish-language versions of the special under the titles Desfile de Navidad Disney, (Feliz) Navidad Disney, and Navidad Mágica Disney, which typically feature Latin musicians. Until 2018, the special was also simulcast by CBC Television in Canada.

The 2005 edition of the parade won Harborlight Entertainment and ABC the Daytime Emmy Award for Outstanding Special Class Special.

== History ==
Walt Disney himself presented the first holiday parade from Disneyland Park in 1962 on the NBC network as an episode of his weekly anthology series Walt Disney's Wonderful World of Color entitled "Holiday Time at Disneyland." This was also the television parade debut of the Babes in Toyland soldiers, replicated exactly from the 1961 Disney musical feature, The soldiers, later seen in Mary Poppins, continue to be highly recognizable symbols of Disney Parks holiday parades and shows.

Walt Disney World's Very Merry Christmas Parade began on the ABC network 1983 with Joan Lunden as the first (and longest-running to date) host and Mike Douglas as co-host. Alan Thicke later replaced Douglas, and Regis Philbin was later added as an on-street interviewer. In 1991, the first year there was a parade from both Magic Kingdom Park and (then) Disney-MGM Studios, Philbin and Lunden began a five-year run as co-hosts, before both were replaced by a series of rotating hosts for the next four years. Over time, the Disneyland Park in California gained more prominence, going from segments to parade coverage.

After experimenting with airing the parade in primetime in 1999, the parade was replaced by Walt Disney World 'Twas The Night Before Christmas in 2000, which aired on Christmas Eve in the same timeslot. While parade footage was seen in excerpts, the special served to track Santa Claus' voyage, a'la NORAD Tracks Santa as he made his way to Walt Disney World, with the repertory cast of Whose Line Is It Anyway as hosts. The parade returned as a Christmas morning special in 2001, with Philbin returning as co-host, now alongside his colleague Kelly Ripa from Live with Regis and Kelly.

Over the years, the program has gone through a number of name changes. During the 1980s and 1990s, the program was known as The Walt Disney World Very Merry Christmas Parade. The program's name was then changed to Walt Disney World Christmas Day Parade. From 2009 through 2013, the program was referred to as the Disney Parks Christmas Day Parade. For a few years after that, the program's name would change on a yearly basis, being known as Disney Parks Frozen Christmas Celebration in 2014, Disney Parks Unforgettable Christmas Celebration in 2015, Disney Parks Magical Christmas Celebration in 2016 and 2017, and finally Disney Parks Magical Christmas Day Parade in 2018 and 2019.

Due to the COVID-19 pandemic in the United States, the 2020 edition (branded as the Disney Parks Magical Christmas Day Celebration) was stated by ABC to have been "reimagined", with plans to include highlights from past editions among other features. A limited in person parade would return in 2021.

The parade celebrated its Silver Jubilee in 2008. The 2023 ruby jubilee celebrations also marked one final event in a year long celebration of the Walt Disney Centennial celebrations marked by the wider Walt Disney group of companies, titled Disney Parks Magical Christmas Day Celebration.

== Hosts and entertainers ==
Announcer
Original announcer, Dick Tufeld; Joe Hursh, current voice of Walt Disney World
1983
Hosts Joan Lunden & Mike Douglas. Carol Lawrence promotes Disney's World Showcase Program at the EPCOT Center
1984
Hosts Joan Lunden; Bruce Jenner & Regis Philbin
1985
Hosts Joan Lunden and Ben Vereen; on-street interviewer Regis Philbin. Regis Philbin previews The Living Seas at EPCOT Center and Ben Vereen previews Captain EO. Ben Vereen sings Go Tell It on the Mountain. Special holiday messages from US President Ronald Reagan, UK Prime Minister Margaret Thatcher and Canadian Prime Minister Brian Mulroney, as well as from World Showcase Cast Members from France, China, Mexico, Italy, Germany, Morocco and Japan.
1986
Hosts Ben Vereen; Joan Lunden; & Regis Philbin
1987
Host Alan Thicke; Joan Lunden; & Regis Philbin; portions of the parade were aired live.
1988
Hosts Alan Thicke; Joan Lunden; & Regis Philbin at Walt Disney World, and Sarah Purcell & Scott Valentine at Disneyland.
1989
Hosts Alan Thicke; Joan Lunden; Regis Philbin; & Kermit the Frog at Walt Disney World, Joanna Kerns; & Marc Price at Disneyland
1990
Hosts Alan Thicke, Joan Lunden and Regis Philbin at Walt Disney World and Sarah Purcell at Disneyland. Entertainers: Christa Collins; Amy Grant; Lee Greenwood; & Jaleel White
1991
Hosts Regis Philbin and Joan Lunden; featuring Mayim Bialik, Entertainers: Lee Greenwood; & Sandi Patti; This was the first year there were two Walt Disney World parades: the Surprise Celebration Parade from Magic Kingdom Park and the Very Merry Christmas Parade (just for the broadcast) from (then) Disney-MGM Studios, in addition to Disneyland and coverage of international celebrations. It was also the first year Regis Philbin moved from on-the-spot interviews to the co-host position with Joan Lunden.
1992
Hosts Regis Philbin and Joan Lunden; Co-Hosts Ed McMahon, & John Davidson, featuring Jodi Benson, Cheech Marin, Betty White, Earl Hindman, Leanza Cornett, Richard Karn, The Great Gonzo
1993
Hosts Regis Philbin and Joan Lunden; on-street interviewer Robby Benson. The parade was broadcast live. Appearances by Kathie Lee Gifford, John Davidson & Bill Nye the Science Guy. Reading of The Night Before Christmas by President Bill Clinton. Announcer: Dick Tufeld.
1994
Hosts Regis Philbin and Joan Lunden; featuring Margaret Cho, Nancy Kerrigan and Jonathan Taylor Thomas.
1995
Hosts Regis Philbin and Joan Lunden; featuring Richard White, Jodi Benson, Brad Kane, Brianne Leary, J.D. Roth and Ben Savage & Rider Strong; portions of the parade were aired live.
1996
Hosts Jerry Van Dyke and Suzanne Somers; entertainment by Gary Beach, Brianne Leary, Sandi Patti, J.D. Roth, Ernie Sabella, and Samuel E. Wright. Brianne Leary goes backstage on the production of 101 Dalmatians.
1997
Hosts Melissa Joan Hart and Ben Savage. Entertainment by Jodi Benson, Harlem Globetrotters, Downtown Julie Brown, Ernie Sabella, Paige O'Hara, and the Backstreet Boys. A Magical Walt Disney World Christmas.
1998
Hosts Caroline Rhea and Richard Kind. Entertainment by Justin Cooper, Wayne Brady, *NSYNC, Martina McBride, and Donny Osmond.
1999
Hosts Mitchell Ryan and Susan Sullivan; co-host Wayne Brady; performances by *NSYNC, 98 Degrees, Harry Connick, Jr., SHeDAISY, & James Ingram.
2000 (Walt Disney World 'Twas The Night Before Christmas)
Hosts Wayne Brady, Colin Mochrie, and Ryan Stiles; co-host Frankie Muniz; performances by 98 Degrees, *NSYNC, Billy Gilman, SHeDAISY, Jessica Simpson, and Monica.
2001
Hosts Regis Philbin and Kelly Ripa; co-host Wayne Brady; performances by Aaron Carter, Charlotte Church, Mandy Moore, Baha Men, Aaron Tippin, City High,
2002
Hosts Regis Philbin and Kelly Ripa; on-street interviewer and entertainer Wayne Brady; entertainment by The Wiggles, Bear From Bear in the Big Blue House, Jump 5, John Rzeznik, Heather Headley, Lee Ann Womack, Hilary Duff, Alexis Kalehoff, Andrea McArdle; appearances by John Ritter, George Lopez, Meredith Vieira, Eric Roberts & Sara Rue, Robin Roberts and Star Jones. Rename: Walt Disney World Christmas Day Parade
2003
Hosts Regis Philbin and Kelly Ripa at Walt Disney World; George Lopez at Disneyland. On-street interviewer Robin Roberts. Entertainment by Disney Channel's Christy Carlson Romano, Raven-Symone, Anneliese van der Pol, and Orlando Brown; American Idol's Clay Aiken; Playhouse Disney's Bear in the Big Blue House; Jump 5, Lance Bass, Florence Henderson, Enrique Iglesias, Star Jones, Carlos Ponce, Rascal Flatts, Jessica Simpson, Wayne Brady, Ericka Dunlap, Michelle Kwan, and Gregory Michael.
2004
Hosts Regis Philbin and Kelly Ripa at Walt Disney World; Kermit the Frog and Miss Piggy, and on-street interviewer Gonzo the Great at Disneyland. Music performances by: Mariah Carey, Wynonna Judd, Ashanti, Kelly Clarkson, Juanes, Jump 5 and Diana DeGarmo. Plus: Zach Braff, Jesse McCartney, Erik von Detten, Meredith Vieira and ABC's stars. Disney Channel Stars: Raven-Symone, Christy Carlson Romano and Bear from Bear in the Big Blue House. Also: SHeDAISY, Waneze and America's Funniest Home Videos's Tom Bergeron. Special guest appearance: Julie Andrews.
2005
Hosts Regis Philbin and Kelly Ripa at Walt Disney World; Ryan Seacrest at Disneyland. Entertainment by Diana Krall, MercyMe, Brian Setzer Orchestra; Lonestar; Paulina Rubio; Vanessa Williams; Star Jones; Tiger Woods; Julie Andrews; John O'Hurley; Fantasia; Aly & AJ; The Cheetah Girls; The Chronicles of Narnia: The Lion, the Witch and the Wardrobe's stars Anna Popplewell, Georgie Henley, Skandar Keynes, and William Moseley.
2006
Hosts Regis Philbin and Kelly Ripa at Walt Disney World; Ryan Seacrest at Disneyland. Entertainment by American Idol stars Ace Young, Kevin Covais, Paris Bennett, and Mandisa; Miley Cyrus as Hannah Montana; RBD; Playhouse Disney's The Doodlebops; Daniel Powter; Disney Channel's Brenda Song; High School Musical stars Ashley Tisdale, Corbin Bleu, Monique Coleman, and Lucas Grabeel; Beyoncé; Andrea Bocelli; Bianca Ryan; Aly & AJ; Michael Bolton; Dancing With the Stars winner Emmitt Smith; and Tiffany's Dance Academy. Appearances by Extreme Makeover: Home Edition's Ty Pennington, Eduardo Xol, and Paige Hemmis; Johnny Depp and Travel Channel's Samantha Brown.
2007
Hosts Regis Philbin and Kelly Ripa at Walt Disney World; Ryan Seacrest at Disneyland. Entertainment: Patti LaBelle, the cast of "Dancing With the Stars" (Sabrina Bryan, Hélio Castroneves, Drew Lachey, Joey Fatone, Cheryl Burke, Julianne Hough, Derek Hough), Jon Secada, Jessica Simpson, Katharine McPhee, Jonas Brothers, the cast of Disney's Animal Kingdom's Festival of the Lion King, Miley Cyrus, and the cast of High School Musical. Giselle from Enchanted was featured with the Disney Princesses in the parade for the first time.
2008
Hosts Regis Philbin and Kelly Ripa at Walt Disney World, with Ryan Seacrest at Disneyland. Airs on ABC. Entertainment: Billy Ray Cyrus, Miley Cyrus, the Jonas Brothers, Sarah Brightman, José Feliciano, David Cook, the Imagination Movers, Corbin Bleu (who debuted a new song), the Broadway cast of Mary Poppins and Dance the Magic dancers from dance studios from all over the country. Since this was the 25th anniversary of the parade, clips of previous years were shown (usually directly after commercial breaks) featuring Beyoncé (2006), Kermit the Frog (1989), Amy Grant, (1990) Nancy Kerrigan (1994) and Jodi Benson (1997), and a repeat of Vanessa Williams' entire performance from 2005 closed the telecast.
2009
Hosts Kelly Ripa and Nick Cannon at Walt Disney World, with Ryan Seacrest at Disneyland. Airs on ABC. Entertainment: Demi Lovato, Celine Dion, Stevie Wonder, Imagination Movers, Jonas Brothers, Yanni, Kris Allen, Steve Rushton, Selena Gomez, Anika Noni Rose, and Dance the Magic dancers which include dance schools from all over the country. Regis Philbin did not host this year due to hip surgery a week before taping the parade. 2009 marked the show's change in title to Disney Parks Christmas Day Parade as part of a branding consolidation announced in February.
2010
Hosts Ryan Seacrest and Maria Menounos at Walt Disney World, with Nick Cannon at Disneyland. Airs on ABC. Entertainment: Mariah Carey, Selena Gomez, Big Bad Voodoo Daddy with Dancing with the Stars dancers, Debby Ryan, Amber Riley, Jackie Evancho, Sean Kingston, Darius Rucker, and American Idol season 9 winner Lee DeWyze. Kelly Ripa did not host this year due to a stress fracture.
2011
Hosts Mario Lopez and Maria Menounos at Walt Disney World, with Nick Cannon and Marlee Matlin at Disneyland. Airs on ABC. Entertainment: Justin Bieber, Jennifer Hudson, Scotty McCreery, Cee Lo Green, The Muppets, Christina Aguilera, OneRepublic, Phineas and Ferb, China Anne McClain, McClain Sisters, Bella Thorne and Zendaya, Katie Leclerc and Sean Berdy, and singer-songwriter Nathan Pacheco with Welsh mezzo-soprano vocalist Katherine Jenkins.
2012
Hosts Mario Lopez at Disneyland, Maria Menounos and Nick Cannon at Walt Disney World. Airs on ABC. Entertainment: Backstreet Boys, tobyMac, Ross Lynch, Colbie Caillat, Lady Antebellum, Phillip Phillips, The Cast of Modern Family, Gabby Douglas, Sophia Grace & Rosie, Brad Paisley, and Yolanda Adams.
2013
Hosts Nick Cannon at Disneyland with Neil Patrick Harris and Lara Spencer at Walt Disney World. Airs on ABC. Entertainment: Demi Lovato, Jason Derulo, Jordin Sparks, the cast of "Teen Beach Movie" (Ross Lynch, Maia Mitchell, Grace Phipps and Garrett Clayton), Mary J. Blige, Il Volo, The Wanted, Ne-Yo, Candice Glover, Dove Cameron, and Samantha Brown. Darth Vader and some Stormtroopers also tried to take over the parade.
2014
Hosts Rob Marciano at Disneyland and Robin Roberts with Tim Tebow at Walt Disney World with Sarah Hyland at Aulani. Airs on ABC. Renamed Disney Parks Frozen Christmas Celebration. Entertainment: Alex & Sierra, Gavin DeGraw, Lucy Hale, Train, Laura Marano, Trey Songz, Sabrina Carpenter, Prince Royce, Lexi Walker, Trisha Yearwood, and Ariana Grande.
2015
Hosts Robin Roberts, Jesse Palmer and Janel Parrish. Airs on ABC. Renamed Disney Parks Unforgettable Christmas Celebration. For the first time since the 1980s, all of the major broadcasting elements are at Walt Disney World (despite the title insisting that both major parks would be involved as they have for over 25 years). Entertainment: Jason Derulo, Ariana Grande, Seal, Jhene Aiko, Charles Perry, Tori Kelly, Reba McEntire, Andy Grammer, Charlie Puth, Dove Cameron, Sofia Carson, Booboo Stewart, and Cameron Boyce. A number of the performances for this year are based around the album We Love Disney, which was released the previous October.
2016
Hosts Derek Hough and Julianne Hough at Walt Disney World and Jesse Palmer with Aubrey Anderson-Emmons and Miles Brown at Disneyland. Airs on ABC. Renamed Disney Parks Magical Christmas Celebration. Starting this year, the parade returns to being filmed from both major Disney parks, with the musical performances being filmed at Walt Disney World (across all four of the main parks) and the parade segments being filmed at Disneyland. Entertainment: Trisha Yearwood, Garth Brooks, Kelly Clarkson, Sofia Carson, Jordan Fisher, Mariah Carey, Gavin DeGraw, OneRepublic, Alessia Cara, Flo Rida.
2017
Hosts Julianne Hough and Nick Lachey at Walt Disney World and Jesse Palmer with Sean Giambrone and Olivia Rodrigo at Disneyland. Airs on ABC and Disney Channel. For the first time since 2013, the broadcast retains the name and format it had the previous year. Entertainment: Ciara, Darius Rucker, Fifth Harmony, Fitz and the Tantrums, Jason Derulo, Lea Michele, 98 Degrees, Telly Leung and Arielle Jacobs, Sofia Carson, Idina Menzel.
2018
Hosts Jordan Fisher and Sarah Hyland at Walt Disney World and Jesse Palmer with Trevor Jackson and Cierra Ramirez at Disneyland. Airs on ABC. Renamed Disney Parks Magical Christmas Day Parade. Entertainment: Gwen Stefani, Brett Eldredge, Andrea Bocelli, Mateo Bocelli, Jordan Fisher, Aloe Blacc, Olivia Holt, Maddie Poppe, DCappella, Why Don't We.
2019
Hosts Matthew Morrison and Emma Bunton at Walt Disney World and Jesse Palmer with Marsai Martin and J.D. McCrary at Disneyland. Airs on ABC. Entertainment: Sting, Shaggy, Meg Donnelly, Pentatonix, Ingrid Michaelson, Grace VanderWaal, Portugal. The Man, Ally Brooke, the cast of High School Musical: The Musical: The Series.
2020
Hosts Tituss Burgess and Julianne Hough at Walt Disney World. Airs on ABC. Due to the COVID-19 pandemic in the United States, the 2020 edition (branded as the Disney Parks Magical Christmas Day Celebration) was stated by ABC to have been "reimagined", with plans to include highlights from past editions among other features. All major broadcast elements took place at Walt Disney World. Entertainment: Becky G, Florida A&M University Gospel Choir, Jon Batiste, Keedron Bryant, Maddie & Tae, Tituss Burgess, Tori Kelly, Trevor Jackson.
2021
Hosts Derek Hough and Julianne Hough at Walt Disney World and Trevor Jackson and Sherry Cola at Disneyland. Airs on ABC. Entertainment: Brett Eldredge, Chance The Rapper, Darren Criss, Gwen Stefani, Jimmie Allen, Kristin Chenoweth, Meg Donnelly, Norah Jones, Pentatonix.
2022
Hosts Derek Hough and Julianne Hough at Walt Disney World and Sherry Cola and Marcus Scribner at Disneyland. Airs on ABC. Entertainment: Black Eyed Peas, Chloe Flower, David Foster and Katharine McPhee, Maren Morris, Meghan Trainor, Ne-Yo, Il Volo, Trevor Jackson.
2023
Hosts Derek Hough and Julianne Hough with Mickey Guyton at Walt Disney World and Jesse Palmer at Disneyland. Entertainers: Ariana DeBose, Chrissy Metz, The Smashing Pumpkins, Michael Bolton, Meg Donnelly, Iam Tongi, the Broadway and North American Tour casts of Disney's Aladdin. Since this was the 40th anniversary of the parade, performance clips of previous years were shown featuring Gwen Stefani (2018), Mary J. Blige and David Foster (2013) and NSYNC (1998), and interviews with former Parade hosts such as Joan London, Kelly Ripa and Ryan Seacrest reminiscing about the times they hosted.
2024
Hosts: Julianne Hough and Alfonso Ribeiro. Performances: Elton John, John Legend, Andy Grammer, Carly Pearce, Pentatonix, Anika Noni Rose, SEVENTEEN, cast of Descendants: The Rise of Red, the Broadway, West End and North American Tour casts of Beauty and the Beast, The Lion King, Aladdin, Frozen and Hercules.
2025
Hosts: Ginnifer Goodwin and Alfonso Ribeiro with Maia Kealoha. Performances: Gwen Stefani, Coco Jones, Iam Tongi, Lady A, Nicole Scherzinger, Mariah the Scientist, Bebe Rexha.
2026
Hosts: Robert Irwin and Malia Baker with Scarlett Spears.

== See also ==
- Mickey's Very Merry Christmas Party
