= Millennium village =

Millennium village may mean:

- Millennium Villages Project, a project to reduce poverty in Africa by developing a number of villages, led by Columbia University.
- Millennium Village, a closed attraction at Epcot
- Millennium Communities Programme (or Millennium Villages initiative), an English Partnerships housing initiative
