= Millennium Village =

Former celebration centerpiece at Epcot

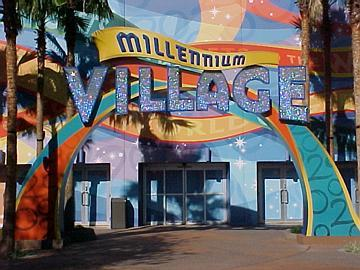
- The front entrance to the attraction

Epcot
- Area: World Showcase
- Coordinates: 28°22′16″N 81°33′07″W
- Status: Closed
- Opening date: October 1, 1999
- Closing date: January 1, 2001

Ride statistics
- Attraction type: Themed Pavilion
- Site area: 60,000 sq ft (5,600 m^{2})

The Millennium Village was located in Epcot and was the centerpiece of Disney's Millennium Celebration. The 60,000-square-foot (5,600 m^{2}) pavilion opened up its doors to the public on October 1, 1999, and was closed down on January 1, 2001. It is, however, used on occasion. Along with the Odyssey Restaurant, the Millennium Village (now named World Showplace) is utilized during the Epcot Food and Wine Festival.

== Pre-Show ==
The preshow area had a presentation which would run throughout the day. The presentation would give the guests an introduction to the countries represented in the preshow area. At the beginning of each presentation the following announcement would be given:

"Welcome to Millennium Village. To help us celebrate this moment in time, we've invited our friends from around the globe to join us. They have come to share with you stories of their accomplishments and dreams. These are their gifts to the world. Please join them now as we begin our celebration."

Then a cast member from each of the countries would present themselves in the following order:

Ethiopia
"We are here to celebrate the traditions of every nation. It is from tradition that we are building the rich tapestry of world cultures. These gifts are our legacy."
India
"We celebrate our differences. And as we share different cultures, we learn to respect the richness that diversity adds to the world. These gifts enrich us."
Kenya
"We celebrate the children of the world. Their laughter is the music of life. Their gifts bring us joy."
New Zealand
"We celebrate the explorers. These brave men and women who have courageously sought to expand our horizons and our knowledge. Their gifts challenge us."
Indonesia
"We celebrate the artists of the world. By sharing their great imagination and knowledge they add beauty and mystery to our lives. Their gifts inspire us."
South Africa
"We celebrate the thinkers, the men and women who have shared their ideas to shape nations, philosophies, and beliefs. Their gifts enlighten us."
Israel
"We celebrate those who preserve our past. Through their efforts we build the foundation for our future. Their gifts guide us."
Namibia
"We celebrate each of you, your dreams, your efforts, and your accomplishments will become our destiny. Please help us Celebrate the Future Hand in Hand."

The show would end with the following announcement:

"We invite you to cross the threshold to the future where you will discover many more gifts and meet new friends from around the globe."

== Interactive Exhibits ==
- United Nations/World Bank

=== Brazil ===
Brazil's display would allow guests a view into the Amazon Rain Forest where guests could experience the native sounds of a rain forest. Guests could also play a game that showed why Brazilians view soccer as their national sport. It also gave guests an overview of Carnaval, one of the largest and colorful celebrations.

=== Chile ===
The Chile display gave guests an overview of harvesting fog through a system of nets that convert it into drinking water and for crops. Guests were also given an overview of the country's crops, vineyards, ranchlands and forests. The ambassadors for Chile dressed as huasos (Chilean cowboys) and would wear a sombrero de huaso. Adjoining the display was an installation called the Moai of Peace, which allowed guests a close-up look at a re-creation of the massive stone carvings on Easter Island. The Moai was not an authentic piece from the island, rather a cast replica made in 1991; no ancient artifacts were transported to the Millenium Village event.

=== Eritrea ===
At the Eritrea display, guests may participate in the historic and traditional coffee ceremony that was performed in the Horn of Africa nation. Eritrea is a premium coffee grower and has a long history in coffee.

=== Expo 2000 Projects ===
The Expo 2000 Projects was a display of eight exhibits from the World's Fair 2000 in Hannover, Germany. The project showed how the eight nations help each other improve the quality of life for their population. Ethiopia, Indonesia, Israel, Kenya, Namibia, New Zealand, India and South Africa were involved.

=== Israel ===
The entrance to the Israel display was paved with real stones from the streets of Jerusalem. Also at the display, guests could take a virtual trip through 3,000 years of Jerusalem's history. Guests could also send a message to the Western Wall by computer. Guests could also see a demonstration of a pen that could translate Hebrew into English. It also included a simulator ride known as the "Time Elevator" that simulated a historic ride throughout Israel and Jerusalem

=== Saudi Arabia ===
Saudi Arabia's display would take guests on a virtual reality tour of the country and its population. The ambassadors would also tell stories about how the kingdom is both modern and traditional. Guests could also play interactive games that gave them a fun way to learn about the country.

=== Scotland ===
Scotland's display allowed guests to play a round of miniature golf where they would also learn about Scottish inventions as they played. Guests would learn about Scottish inventions like anesthesia to breakthroughs in lasers. Guests could also take a virtual tour of Scotland voiced by Robert Burns, a Scottish poet. Tartans that the ambassadors would wear were designed for the decommissioned Royal Yacht Britannia which is now in Scotland.

=== Sweden ===
At the Swedish display, there were four 27-foot (8.2 m) eggs that represented each of the four seasons in Sweden. The final egg which represented winter had an actual snowman in it. Around the eggs were interactive displays about modern Sweden and Swedish inventions such as the computer mouse and pacemaker. This display was also at the 1998 World's Fair in Lisbon.

=== Village Green ===
The Village Green allowed guests to follow plants from seeds, growth, harvest, use, mulching and fertilization. The display would allow guests to understand renewability.

== World Showplace Theater ==
The World Showplace Theater was a 250-seat theater located in Millennium Village. Entertainers from around the world performed in the World Showplace throughout the 15-month celebration.

At the world Showplace the Danish Puppeteers were doing puppet shows everyday written by Hans Christian Andersen.

== Food Court ==
The Millennium Village cafe, called The Gift of Cuisine featured culinary creations from all the continents of the earth. Eight regional kitchens were represented, featuring special recipes and dishes typical of many countries of the world, from the subtle tastes of the Orient to spicy Africa, from favorites of Latin America to Europe's continental cuisine and the bold and color tastes representing the Caribbean.

The Food Court contributed to the main purpose of the Village by sharing one's culture through "the breaking of bread".

== Artisans ==
An Artisan marketplace is found by entering a replica yurt brought from the Kyrgyz Republic. Artisans created their masterpieces while guests watched, sharing stories about their homelands and offering their work for sale.

- Lebanon
- Peru
- Thailand
- Egypt
- Greece
- Korea
- Venezuela
- Ecuador

== The World Culture Game ==
The World Culture Game was a quiz show, hosted by castmembers representing the U.N. The Game consisted of the following teams:

- The Dominos
- The Checkers
- The Pawns
- The Aces
- The Marbles
- The Horseshoes
- The Knucklebones

Each team had a globe with six buttons on it. The object of the game was to match pictures shown on the main screen, with the answer to the question. The contestant would then press the corresponding button accordingly. The game lasted 3 rounds plus a bonus round. For a correct answer you would get 50 points in the 1st round, 100 points in the 2nd round and finally 250 points in the 3rd round. Finally the bonus round was worth 500 points. Furthermore, there was an added bonus for answering first, which meant that you would score double points.

In addition to the game, the main screen would also display a 5-minute presentation presented by the World Bank. The presentation told the story of three projects which showcased the World Banks mission to promote opportunities for all people to prosper and improve their lives.

== See also ==
- Epcot
- Millennium celebrations
- Epcot attraction and entertainment history
