= Germany Pavilion at Epcot =

Pavilion of World Showcase in Epcot

Germany Pavilion
- Pavilion logomark used from 1982 to 2019

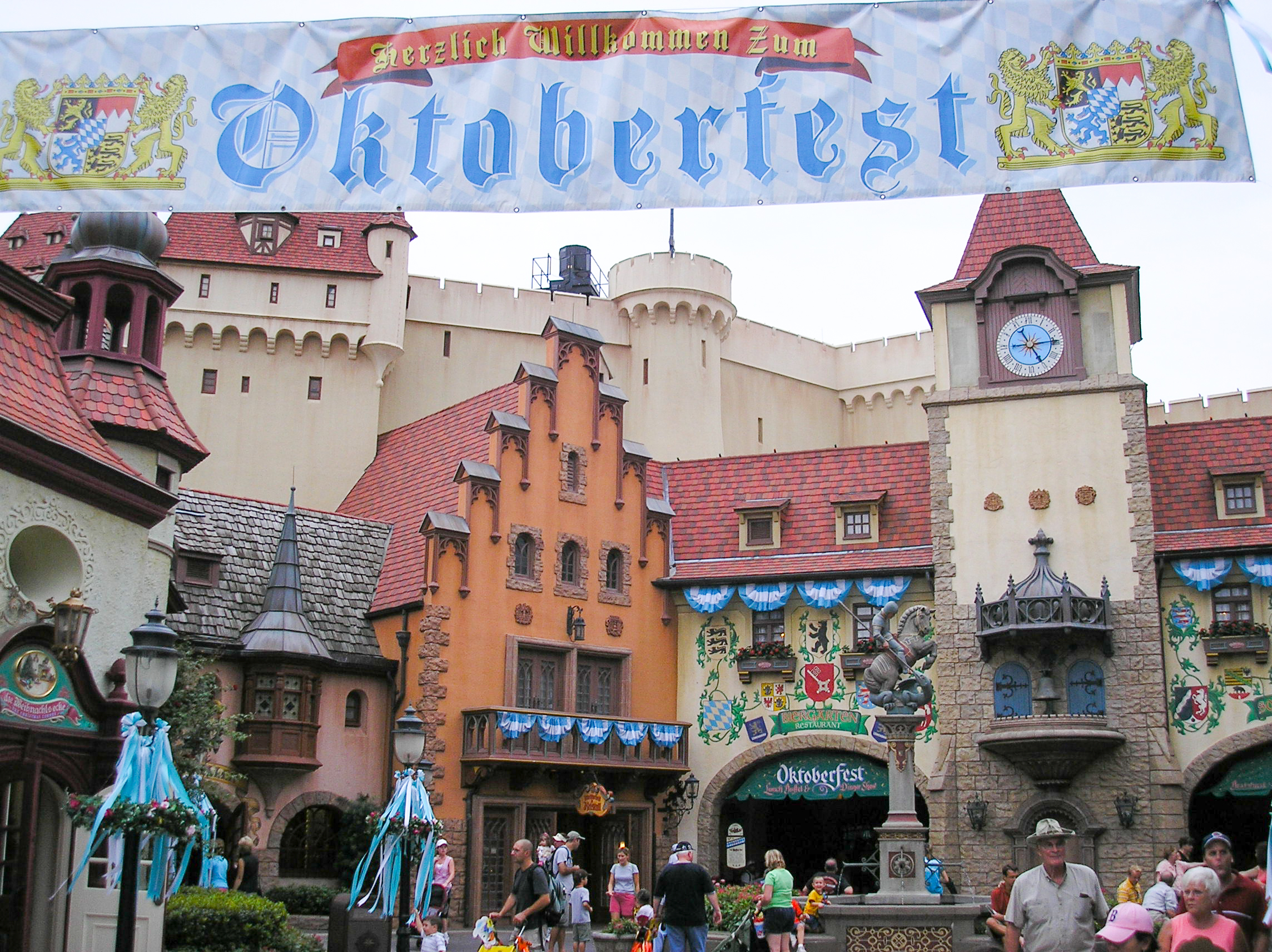
- Entrance to the Pavilion

Epcot
- Area: World Showcase
- Coordinates: 28°22′05″N 81°32′49″W
- Status: Operating
- Opening date: October 1, 1982

Ride statistics
- Attraction type: Themed Pavilion
- Theme: German Village

The Germany Pavilion is a German-themed pavilion that is part of the World Showcase, within Epcot at Walt Disney World in Bay Lake, Florida, United States. Its location is between the China and Italy pavilions.

== History ==
The original design of the pavilion called for a boat ride along the Rhine river. At the time of designing and constructing the pavilion in the mid- to late-1970s and early 1980s, Germany was split into West and East Germany, therefore the pavilion was intended to focus on shared Germanic traditions and folklore, not focusing on one nation or the other, in a similar manner to Norway's Maelstrom. (German reunification didn't occur until 1990.) According to the Walt Disney Company's 1976 annual report, the ride was to be " ... a cruise down Germany's most famous rivers — the Rhine, the Tauber, the Ruhr, and the Isar. Detailed miniatures of famous landmarks will also be seen, including one of the Cologne Cathedral."

Though the pavilion itself was built, Disney never constructed the ride section behind it. It was announced to be part of a future expansion, but never received the funding. Remains are the ride entrance gate and foyer (to the right of the Biergarten entrance) which are now also used as a dining area. A mural covered wall closes off the small space behind it, originally for the ride load and unload areas, which is now used for storage, a workshop, and as a cast member rehearsal space.

== Layout ==
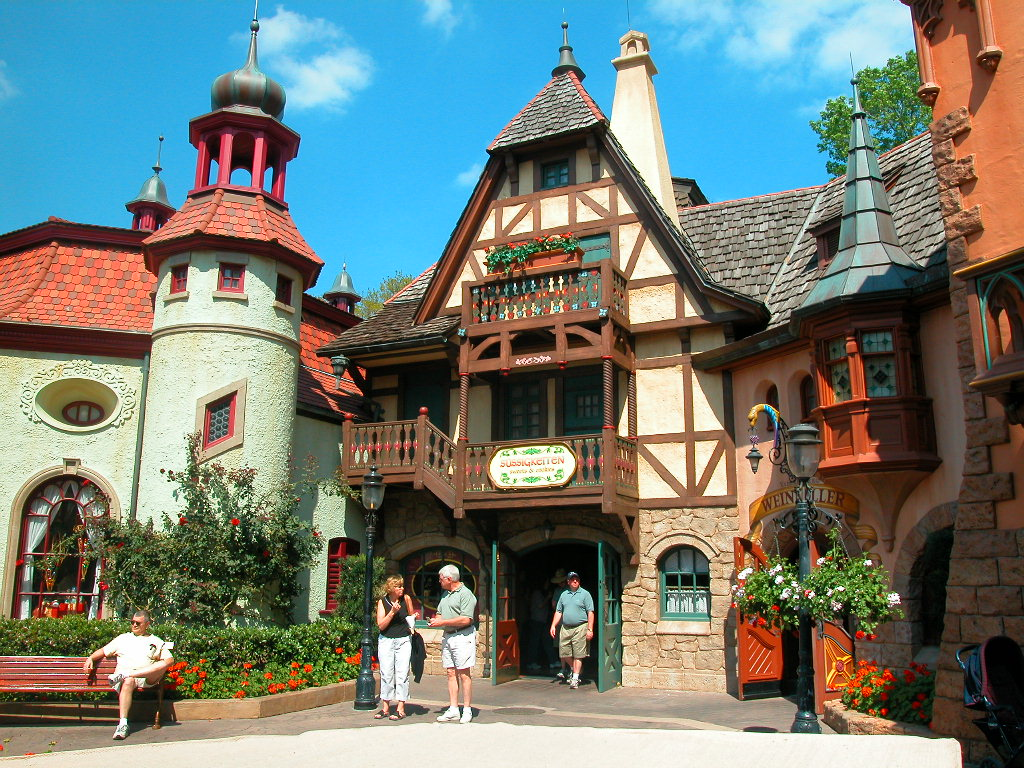
German Pavilion

The Germany Pavilion is designed to look like a German town, but with architecture from different eras and regions. The Platz (square) is decorated with a statue of St. George and the Dragon inspired by the statue in the medieval Bavarian town of Rothenburg ob der Tauber, and a clock tower. The Biergarten, at the rear of the courtyard, sells traditional German food. The pavilion also has numerous small shops selling German goods, including dolls and cuckoo clocks. The area near the pavilion is decorated by an extensive model village with working model trains.

Characters from the Walt Disney animated feature Snow White and the Seven Dwarfs, which was inspired by the version of the tale attributed to the Brothers Grimm, make appearances in and around the pavilion.

== Attractions & Services ==
=== Attractions ===
- EPCOT World Showcase Adventure
  - DuckTales World Showcase Adventure (2022 - Present)

=== Former Attractions ===
- EPCOT World Showcase Adventure
  - Kim Possible World Showcase Adventure (2009 - 2012)
  - Agent P World Showcase Adventure (2012 - 2020)

=== Dining ===
- Biergarten Restaurant (Beer Garden Restaurant), a buffet restaurant designed to look as though Oktoberfest is being celebrated there. The restaurant is styled as a typical Bavarian village, replete with the flags of every German state, numerous facades, and a running watermill. The table features long communal benches for seating, as well as a band playing German folk music. The restaurant is buffet-style, offering such dishes as schnitzel, bratwurst, kielbasa, rouladen, spatzle, sauerkraut, sauerbraten, cucumber salad, and strudel and beer served in one liter steins. The dining hall is actually in the entrance area for the never built boat cruise down the Rhine.
- Sommerfest (Summer Party), a quick-service restaurant

=== Shopping ===
- Das Kaufhaus (The Department Store)
- Der Teddybär (The Teddy Bear)
- Die Weihnachtsecke (The Christmas Corner)
- Karamell-Küche
- Volkskunst (Folk Art)
- Weinkeller (Wine Cellar)

=== Other ===
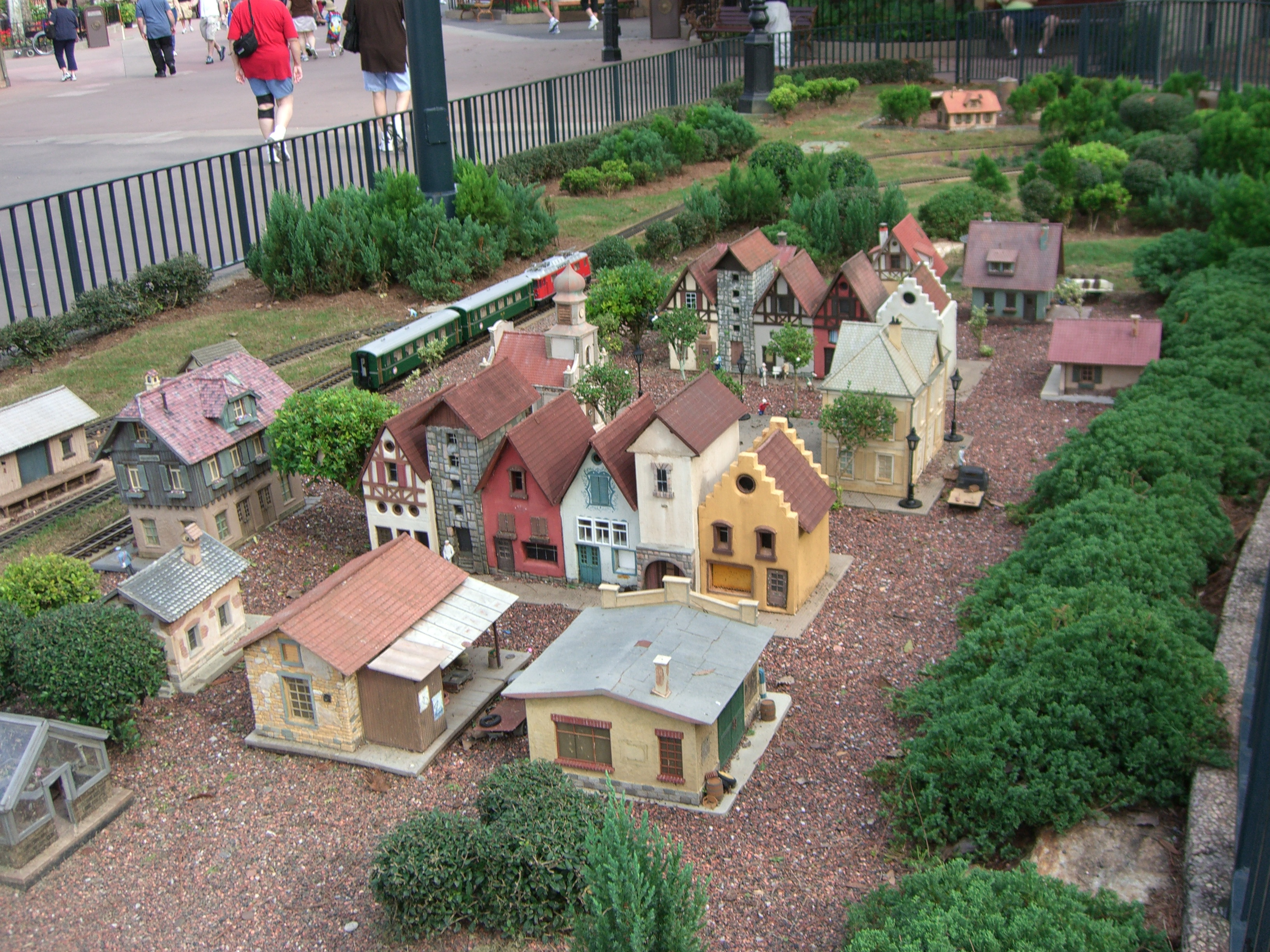
Miniature village and railway

- The Romantic Road Miniature Train Village: A small outdoor model garden railway. It was originally created for the Flower and Garden Festival, but was kept due to its popularity. The trains used in the exhibit are LGB and Piko.
- Glockenspiel: The clock that overlooks St. Georges Platz.
- St. George: A large statue of Saint George slaying a dragon.

=== Entertainment ===
- Characters - Snow White
