= Italy Pavilion at Epcot =

Pavilion of World Showcase in Epcot

Italy Pavilion

- Entrance to the Pavilion

Epcot
- Area: World Showcase
- Coordinates: 28°22′03″N 81°32′54″W
- Status: Operating
- Opening date: October 1, 1982

Ride statistics
- Attraction type: Themed Pavilion

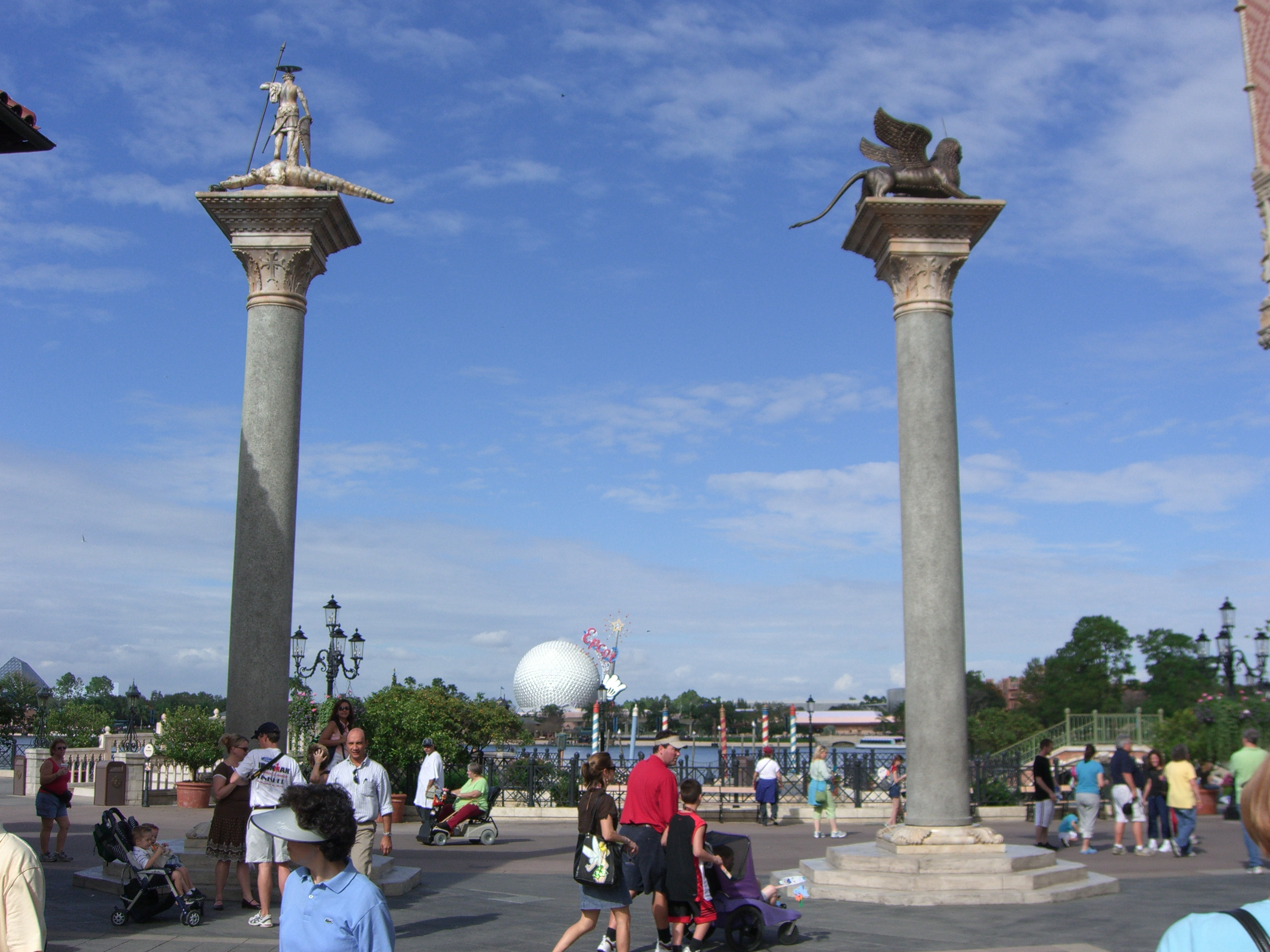
Entrance to Italy with Spaceship Earth in the background

The Italy Pavilion is an Italian-themed pavilion that is part of the World Showcase, within Epcot at Walt Disney World in Bay Lake, Florida, United States. Its location is between the Germany pavilion and The American Adventure.

== Layout ==
The Italy Pavilion features a plaza surrounded by a collection of buildings evocative of Venetian, Florentine, and Roman architecture. Venetian architecture is represented by a re-creation of St Mark's Campanile (bell tower) with the La Gemma Elegante shop representing a replica of the Doge's Palace. The pavilion's design is inspired by other hallmarks of Italian architecture, such as the Columns of San Marco and San Todaro, the Ponte della Paglia and the Neptune Fountain (reminiscent of Rome's Trevi Fountain). There are also small shops selling Italian goods, such as candy, household items, perfumes and wine. Venetian Mask Artisans from Balocoloc in Venice, Italy have also been featured in this Pavilion since 2001, performing live painting throughout the day and showcasing their authentic handmade masks. Musicians, clowns, and acting troupes often appear in the piazza throughout the day.

The original plans for the pavilion called for an expansion that would be built in Epcot's "Phase II" of construction, thus leaving a wall with nothing behind it at the rear of the pavilion. The expansion would have included a gondola dark ride and a Roman ruins walk-through. When "Phase II" was canceled, the pavilion was left incomplete. However, a restaurant by the name of Via Napoli, designed by the Florentine architects Stefano Nardini and Raffaella Melucci, opened under the Patina Restaurant Group in 2010, and brought the pavilion its long-awaited completion. It features Florentine architecture and authentic Neapolitan cuisine. The water used to make pizza dough is imported from Pennsylvania to simulate authentic Neapolitan dough. Via Napoli's three wood-burning ovens pay tribute to the three active volcanoes in Italy: Etna, Vesuvio, and Stromboli. To do this, each of the three ovens are sculpted in the shape of the face of the god that their corresponding volcano is named after. The long communal table in the center of the room was built in Florence and features hand painted tiles depicting iconic monuments in Italy. Other notable features of Via Napoli are its high and vaulted ceilings, imported ceramics, and blown glass, and the abundance of windows that flood the establishment with natural light.

== Service ==
=== Dining ===
- Tutto Italia Ristorante's (formerly Ristorante Alfredo) menu is curated by chef Joachim Splichal. The restaurant is bedecked in murals, frescos, and a Carrara marble piazza.
- Tutto Gusto (Wine Cellar)
- Via Napoli Pizzeria e Ristorante's menu is curated by chef Joachim Splichal. The restaurant was inspired by the dining/architecture trademarks of Naples and Florence, with the house speciality being Neapolitan pizza. The restaurant trio of brick ovens are named Vesuvius, Etna, and Stromboli.
- La Gelateria

=== Shopping ===
- Il Bel Cristallo
- La Bottega Italiana
- Enoteca Castello
- La Gemma Elegante

=== Entertainment ===
- Sergio, a comedic juggler
- Sbandieratori di Sansepolcro, a flag throwing show performed by authentic artists from Sansepolcro, Italy (since October 2014)

== Former attractions ==
The original table-service restaurant in the pavilion, L'Originale Alfredo di Roma Ristorante, closed in the summer of 2007. The restaurant space has been acquired by the Patina Restaurant Group, which has re-launched it as Tutto Italia.

== Gallery ==
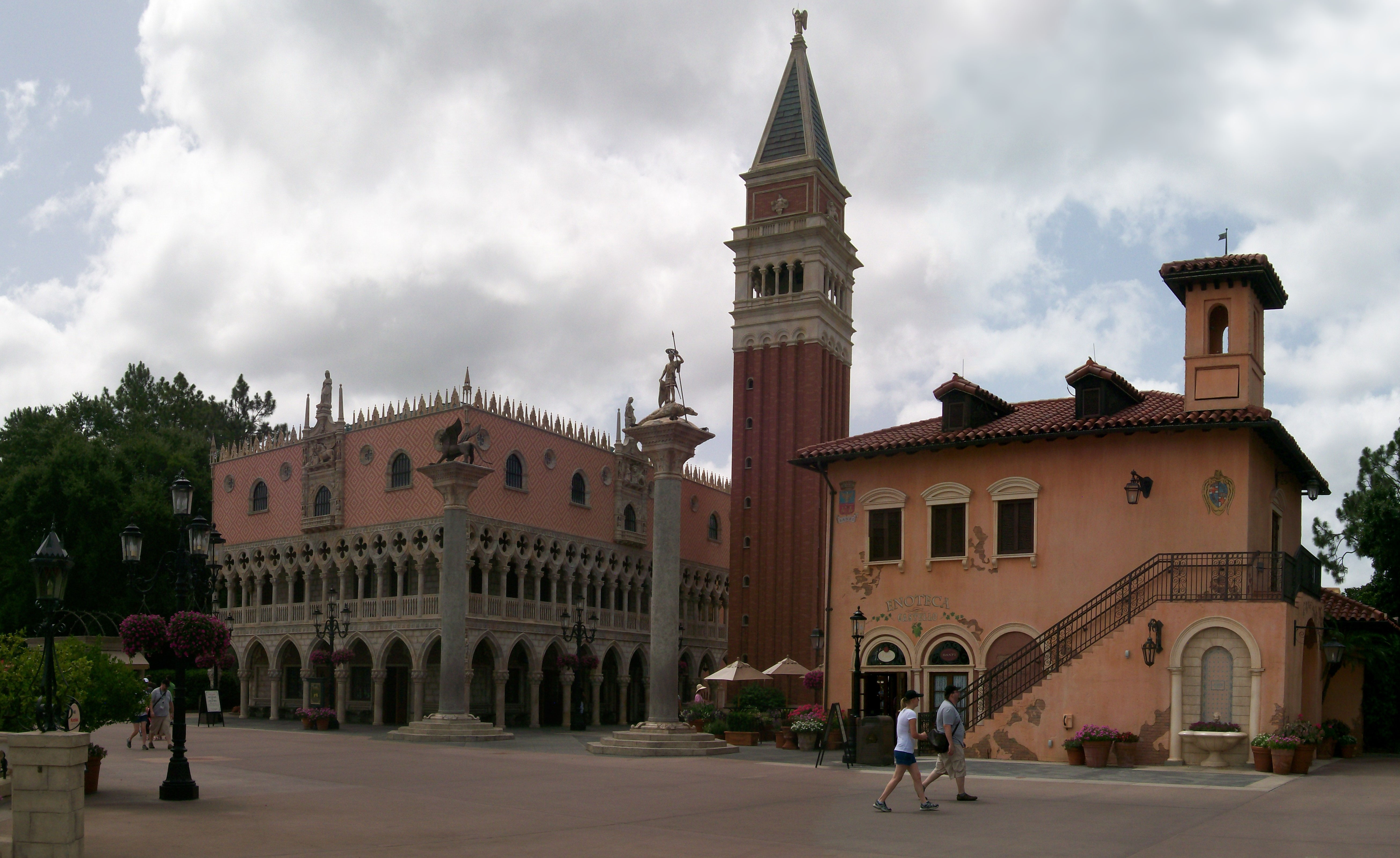
Panorama

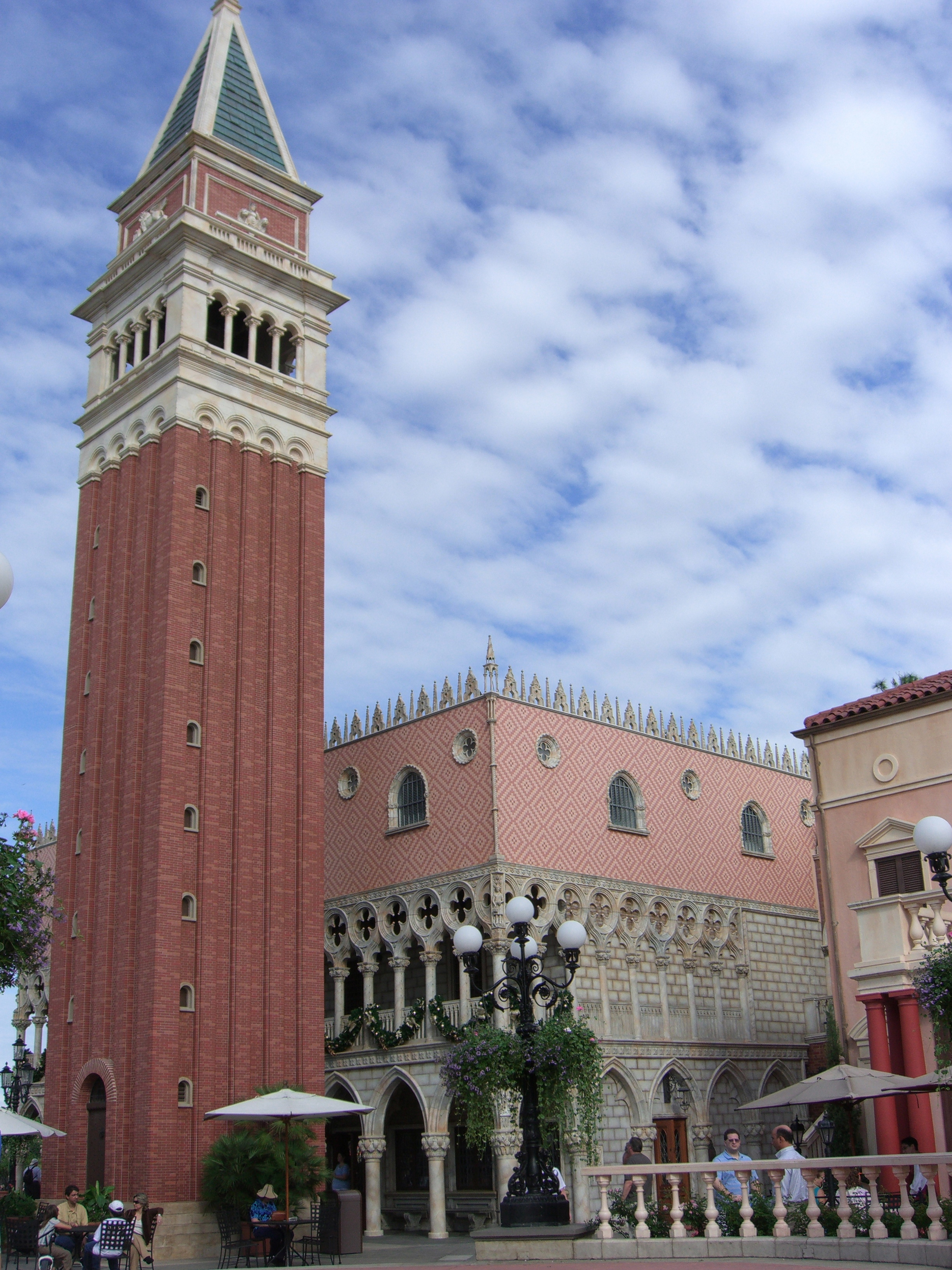
Venice's Doge's palace and campanile

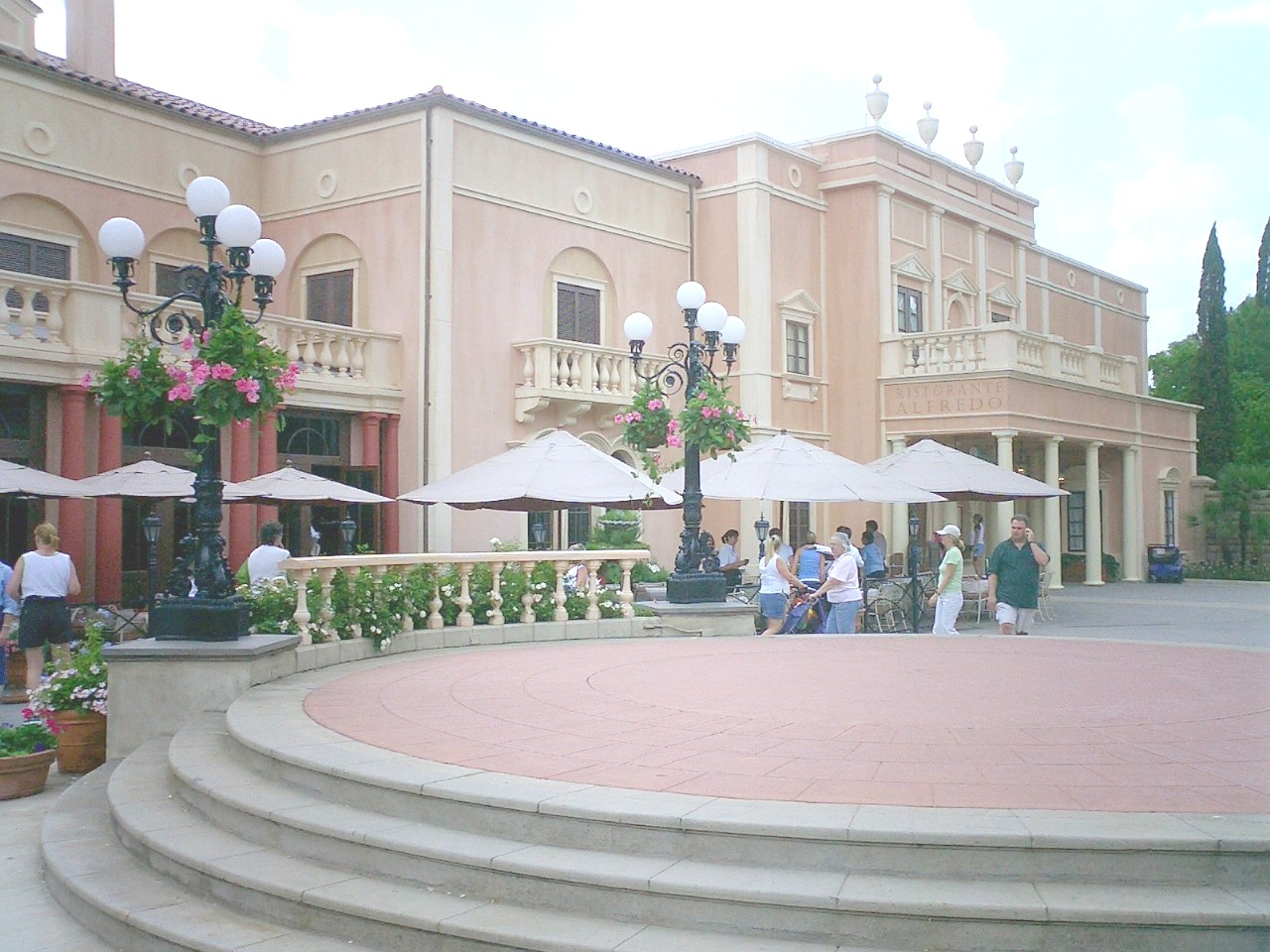
Tutto Italia

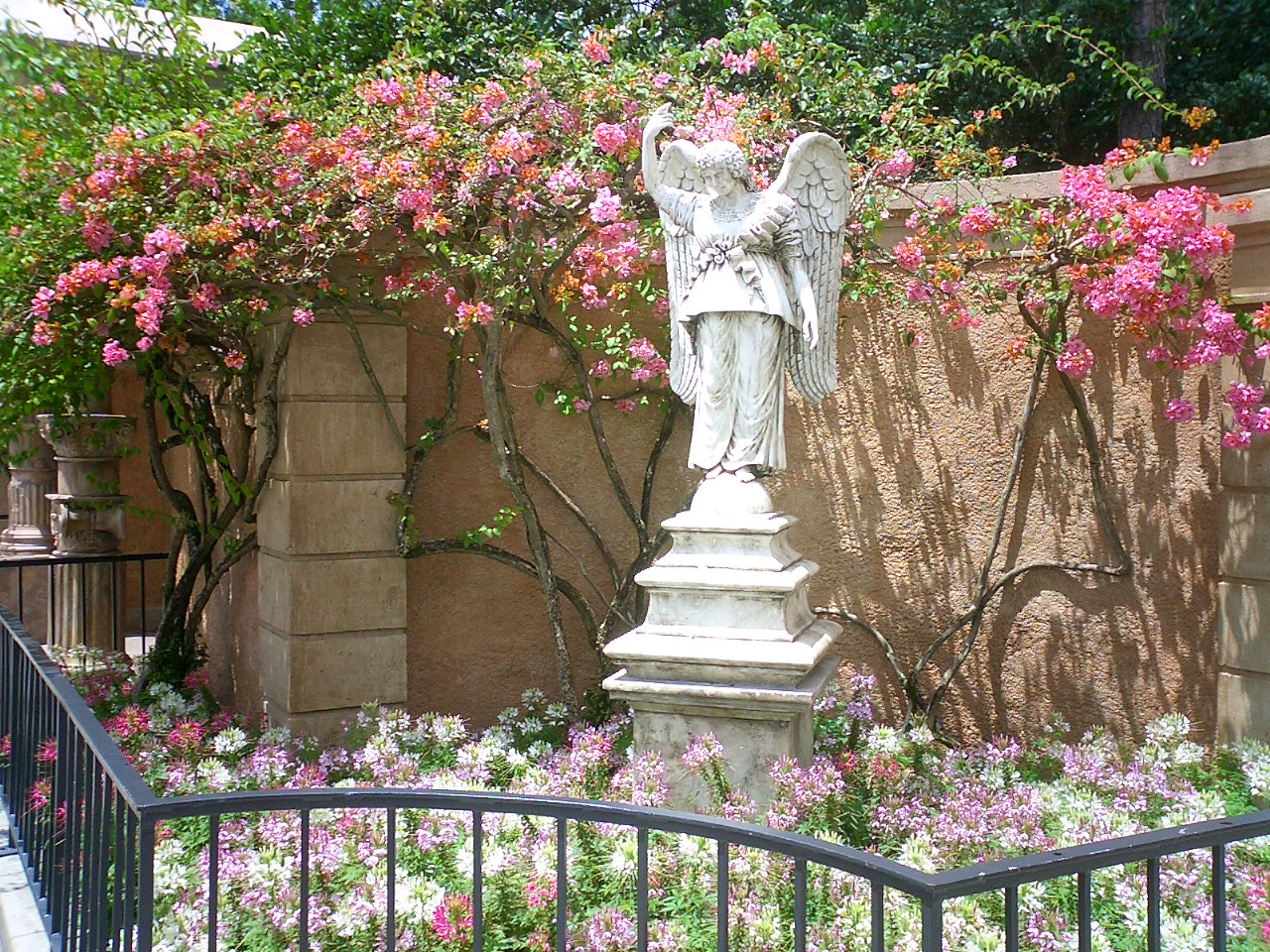

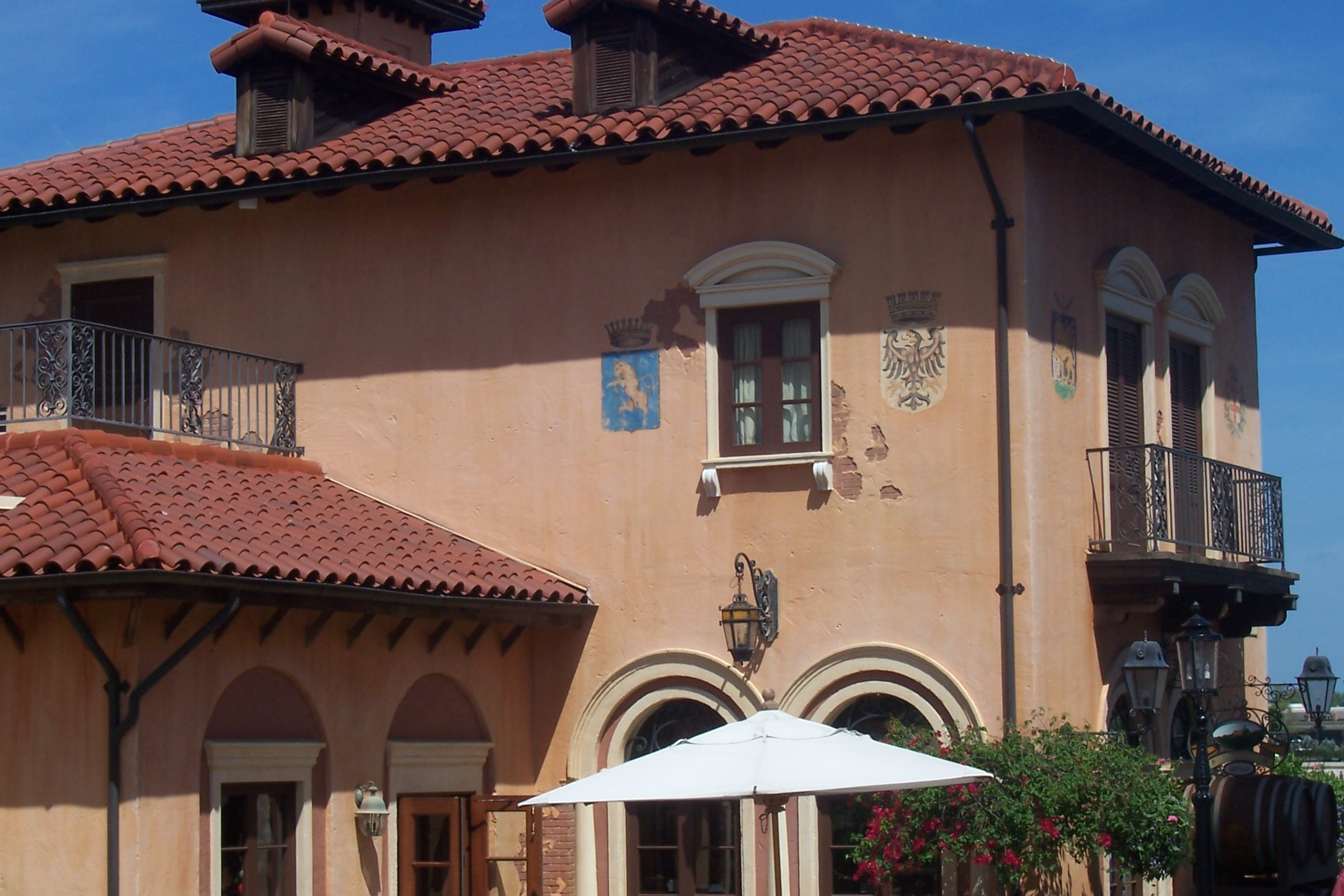
Il Bel Cristallo

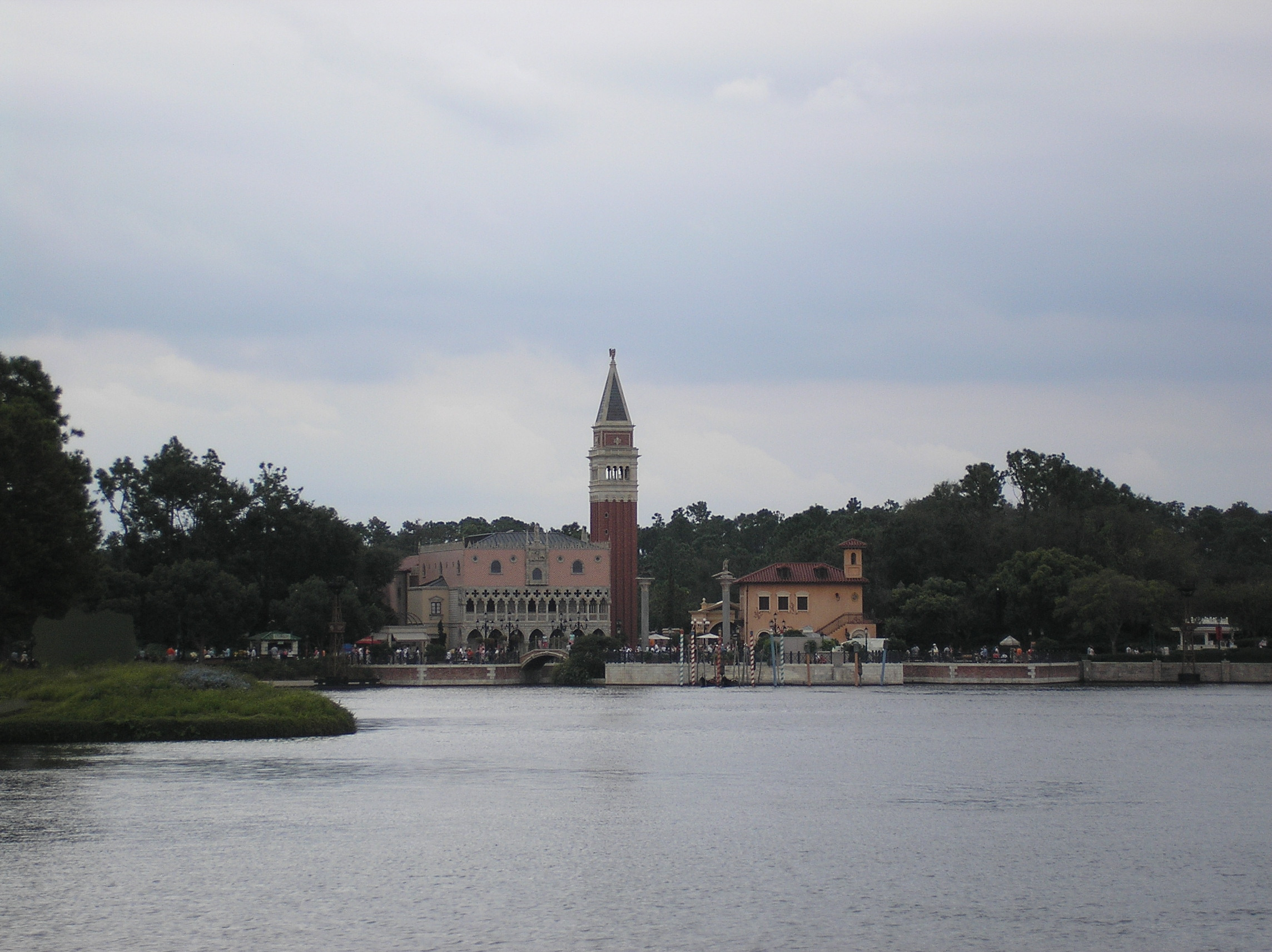
