= Morocco Pavilion at Epcot =

Pavilion of World Showcase in Epcot

Morocco Pavilion
- Pavilion wordmark used until 2019

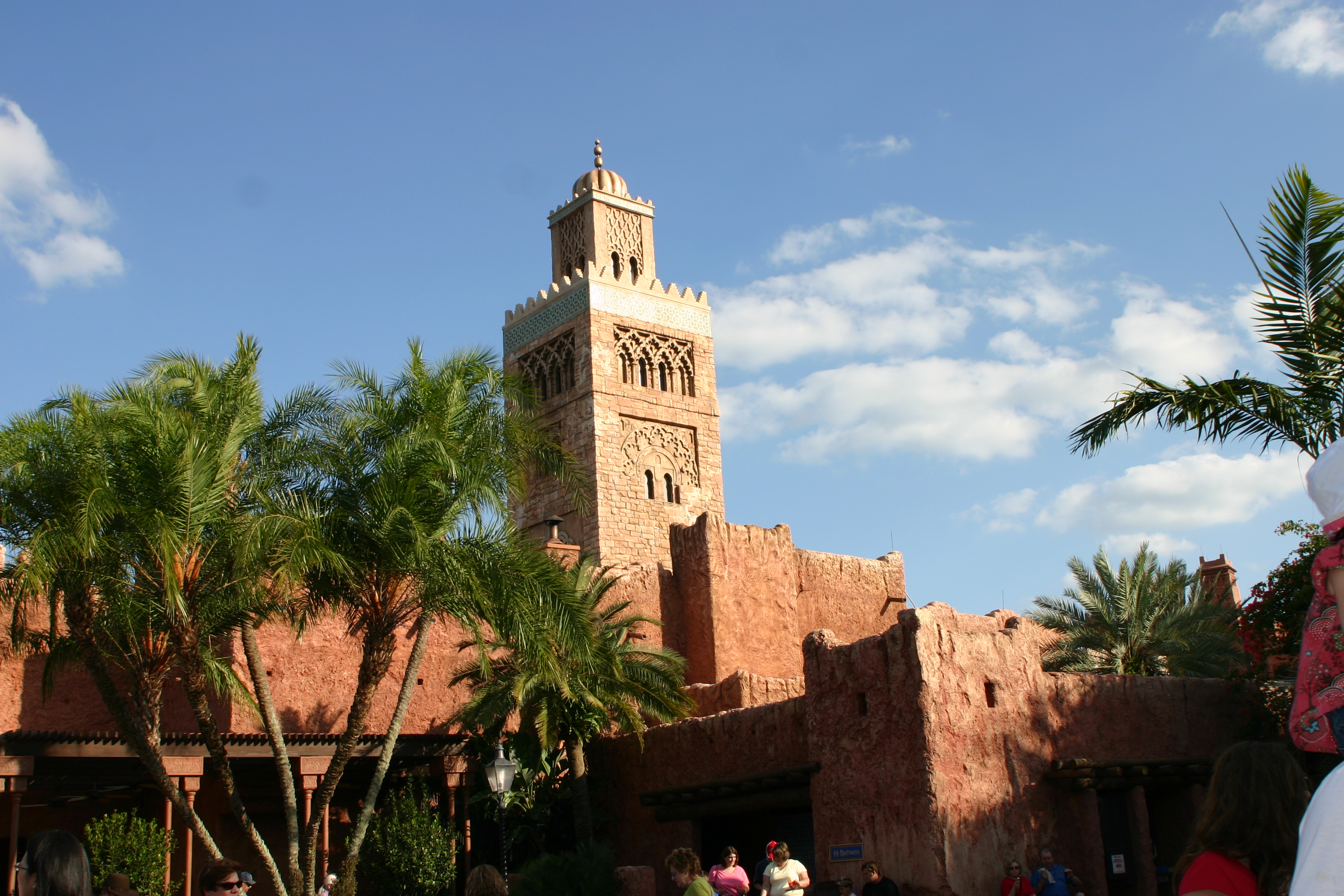

Epcot
- Area: World Showcase
- Coordinates: 28°22′05″N 81°33′06″W
- Status: Operating
- Opening date: September 7, 1984

Ride statistics
- Attraction type: Themed Pavilion

The Morocco Pavilion is a Moroccan-themed pavilion that is part of the World Showcase, within Epcot at Walt Disney World in Bay Lake, Florida, United States. It was the first expansion pavilion to be added to World Showcase, opening on September 7, 1984.

Its location is between the Japan and France pavilions.

== Layout ==
The Morocco Pavilion, designed to look like a Moroccan city with a realistic Minaret, features the only pavilion in which the country's government aided in the design. Guests to the pavilion gain insight on the lifestyle and culture of the Moroccan people through the Gallery of Arts and History. The Fes House shows guests the typical Moroccan house. Inside the pavilion, North African plants including citrus trees, date palms, and olive trees, and fountains can be seen. The courtyard plays hosts to entertainment, including a belly dancing show in the evening. Restaurant Marrakesh, along with the Tangierine Cafe, serve Moroccan fare, including roast lamb in Tajine, Couscous, and Harira soup. Six shops adorn the pavilion, selling patrons everything from rugs to leather goods, and traditional Moroccan clothing.

Some of the major defining structures of the pavilion include Chellah, a replication of the necropolis in Rabat, and the Koutoubia, a replica of the minaret of the same name in Marrakesh. A replica of Bab Boujeloud, the gateway to the Fez medina leads you to a Bazaar area.

King Hassan II actually sent Moroccan artisans to design and create the many mosaics. Due to Islamic religious beliefs on the content of art, the mosaics contain no representations of people. The government also sponsored the pavilion, while a corporation holds sponsoring rights on every other pavilion. The sponsorship of the pavilion by the Moroccan government ended in October 21, 2020, when Disney took ownership of the pavilion.

The Twilight Zone Tower of Terror in Disney's Hollywood Studios can be seen at an angle from the Moroccan pavilion, and the top of the Tower is designed so it blends in with the Moroccan architecture.

== Services ==
=== Exhibits ===
- Race Against the Sun: Ancient Technique to Modern Competition

=== Dining ===
- Spice Road Table is a Mediterranean-themed restaurant with a dining area view of the World Showcase Lagoon.
- Tangierine Café: Flavors of the Medina is a quick service restaurant serving traditional Moroccan cuisine.

==== Former ====
- Restaurant Marrakesh serves from a menu of Moroccan and other Arabian dishes for both lunch and dinner. Select dishes include both chicken and seafood pastilla, harira, a variety of couscous and kebabs, fish tajine, merguez, and semolina pasta. When the Morocco pavilion was being constructed, King Hassan II sent his artisans to Florida to construct the entire pavilion; the hand-tiling performed by his craftsmen can be seen in the restaurant. There is wide-open souk outside the restaurant entrance, and inside, in addition to the tiling, there are brass chandeliers, thuja-inlaid paneling, and bukhara carpets. For dinner, the restaurant features Berber and Chaabi folk music and belly dancing.

=== Shopping ===
- Tangier Trades – Sells jewelry, Moroccan clothing and shoes, mirrors made from camel bones, and daggers
- Brass Bazaar – Mosaic fountains and brass and silver plates and mirrors.
- Casablanca Carpets – Offers Moroccan-made rugs, lanterns, and sconces.
- Souk-Al-Magreb – Sells belly dancing how-to's, couscous and the cooking utensils to make couscous, fez hats, and rose water

==== Former ====
- Outdoor Bazaar – extension of the Brass Bazaar. Items include decorative ceramic tiles and vases, Moroccan instruments, and handmade baskets.
- Medina Arts – More ceramics.

=== Entertainment ===
==== Former ====
- Mo'Rockin – Rock and roll music set to Arabian rhythms April 1999 until September 27, 2014
- B'net Houariyat – Moroccan musical/dance act January 1, 2016 – March 12, 2020
- Storyteller Taarji shares the customs surrounding the Moroccan celebration of Ramadan and Ashura. Seasonal Christmas.

=== Meet Disney characters from the films ===
- Aladdin & Jasmine

== Gallery ==
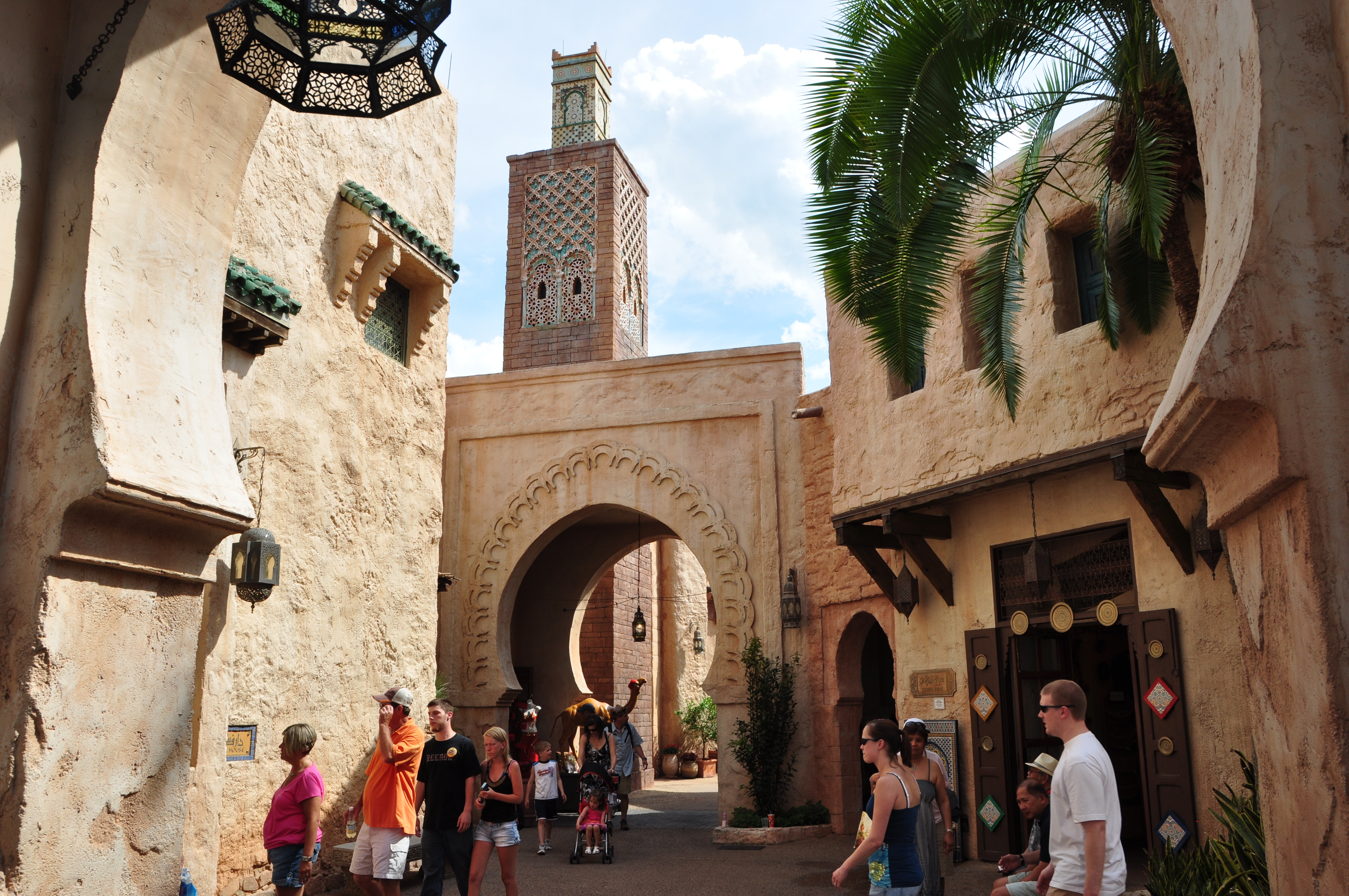

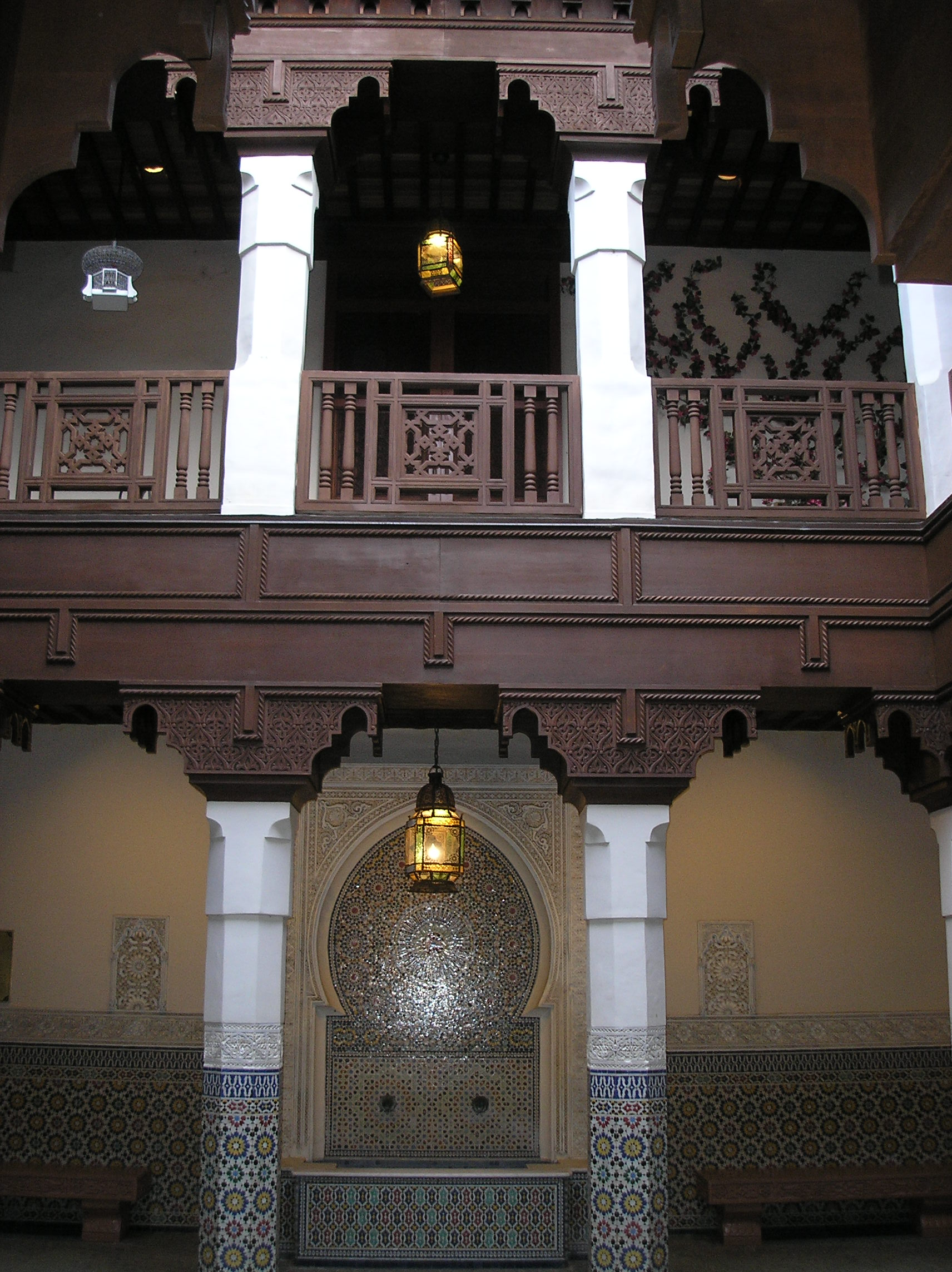
A typical Moroccan House

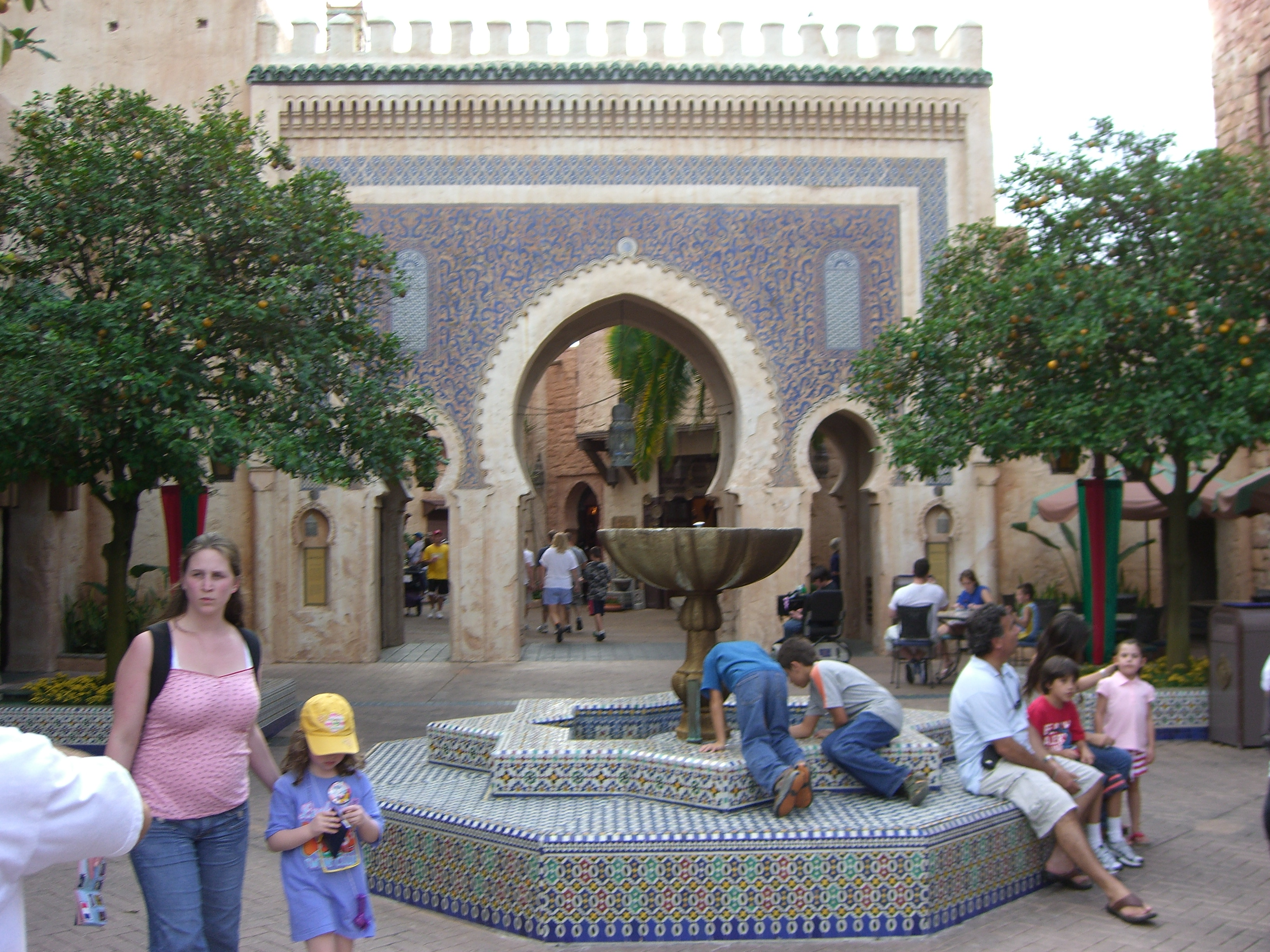
Entrance to Morocco with arch and fountain

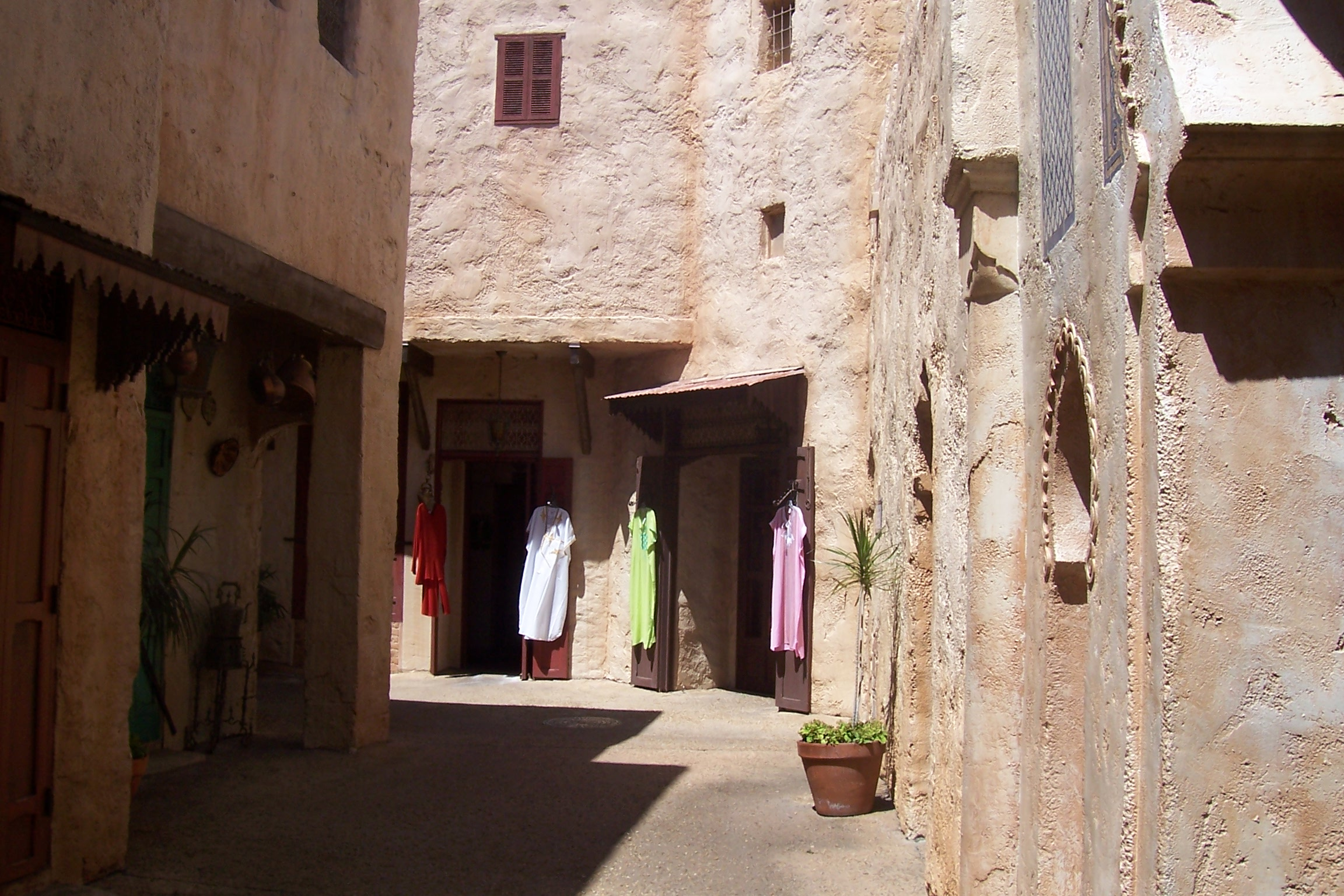
Shops in the rear of the pavilion

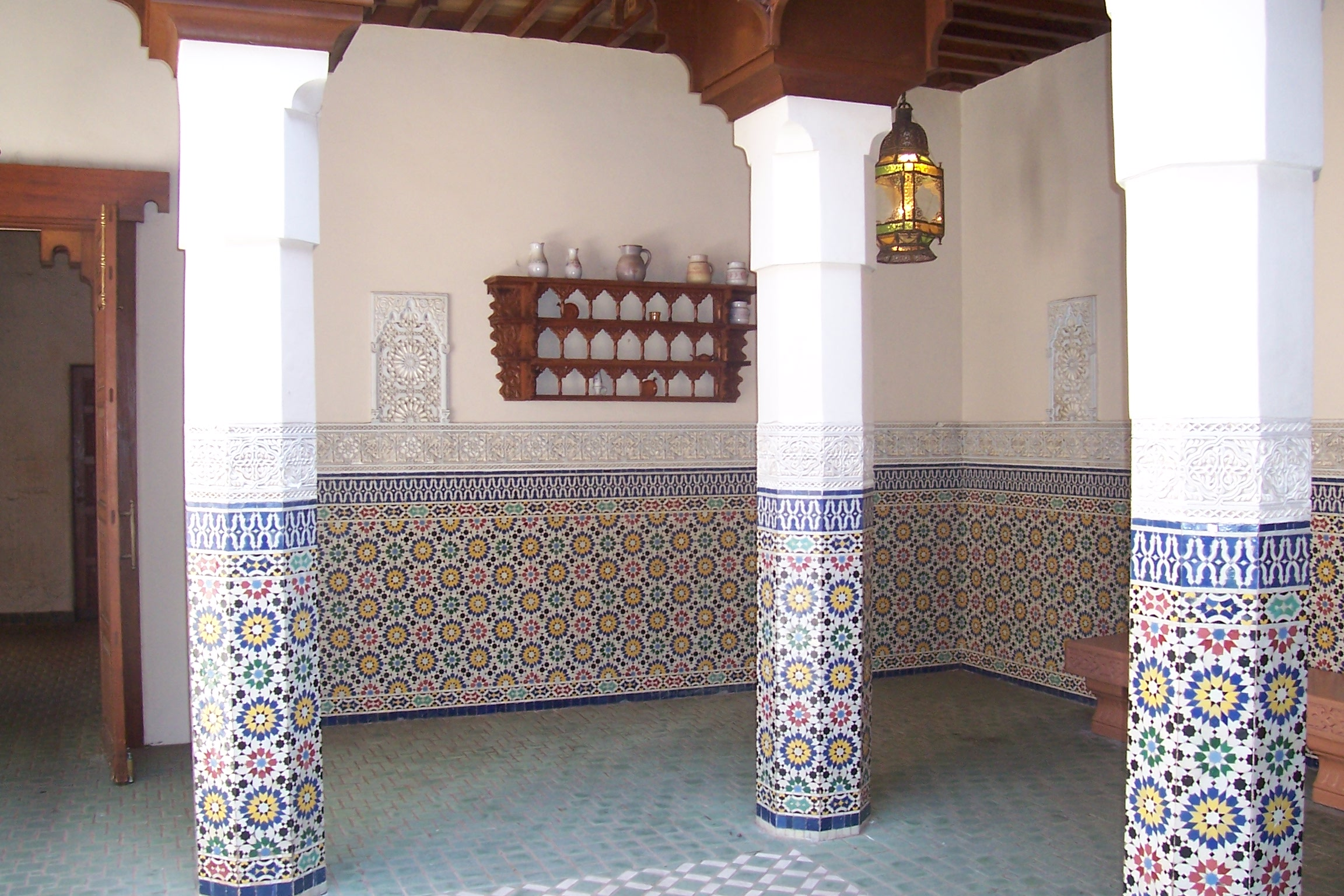
Tile work in the Morocco pavilion

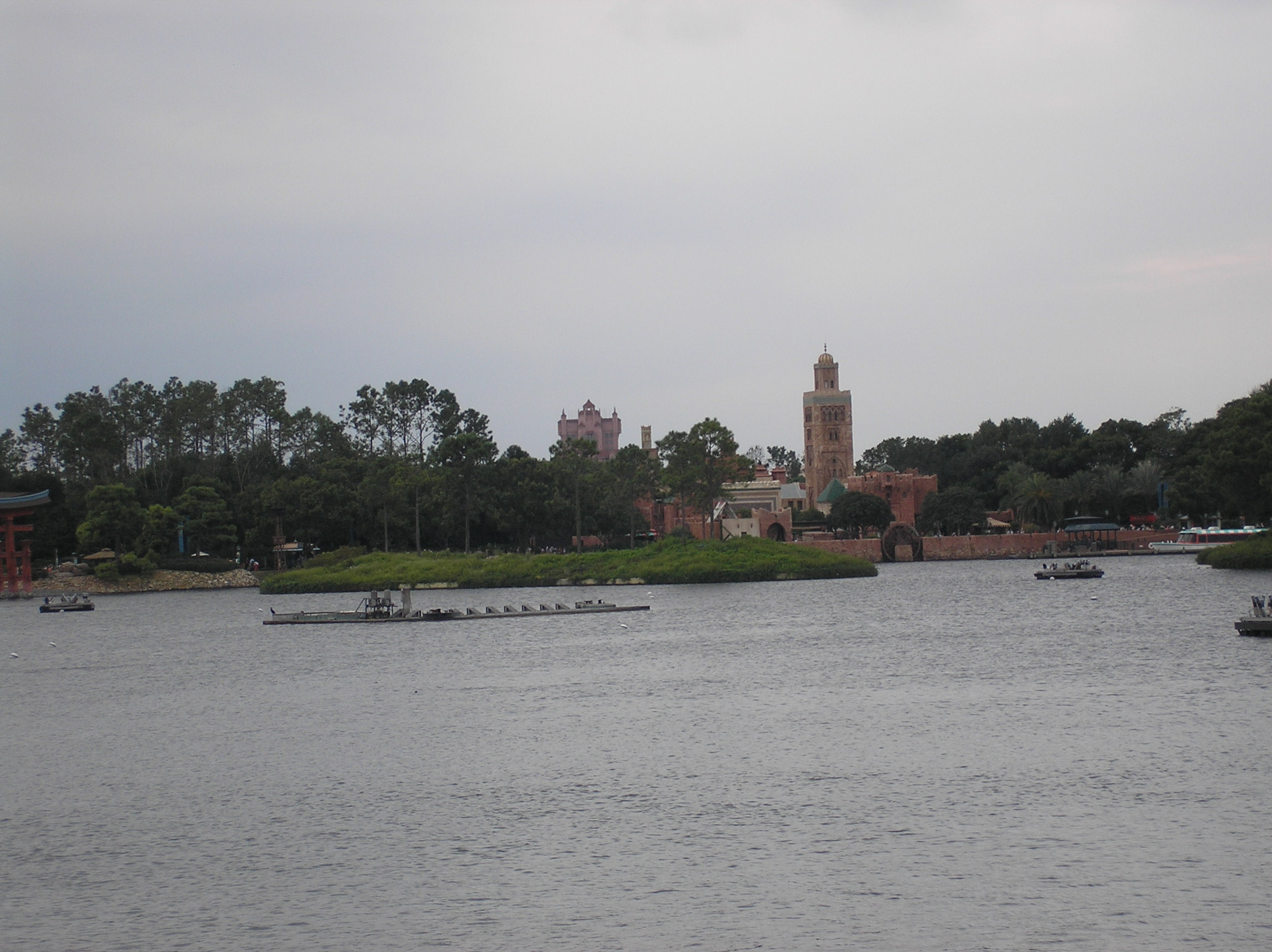
The Morocco pavilion as seen from across World Showcase Lagoon; The Twilight Zone Tower of Terror, whose top is designed to blend in with the pavilion, can be seen beyond the treetops.

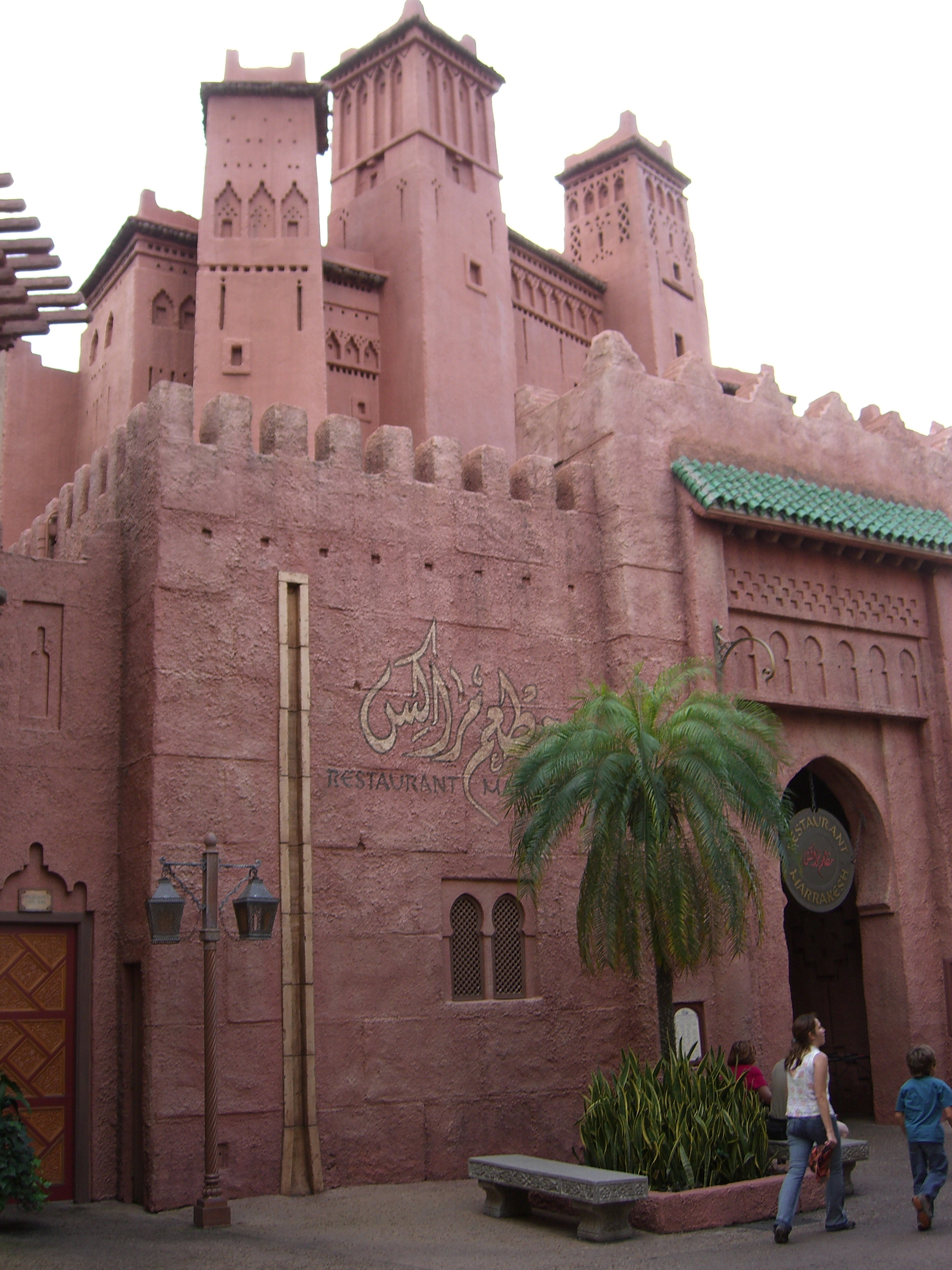
Restaurant Marrakesh
