= Japan Pavilion at Epcot =

Pavilion of World Showcase in Epcot

Japan (EPCOT)

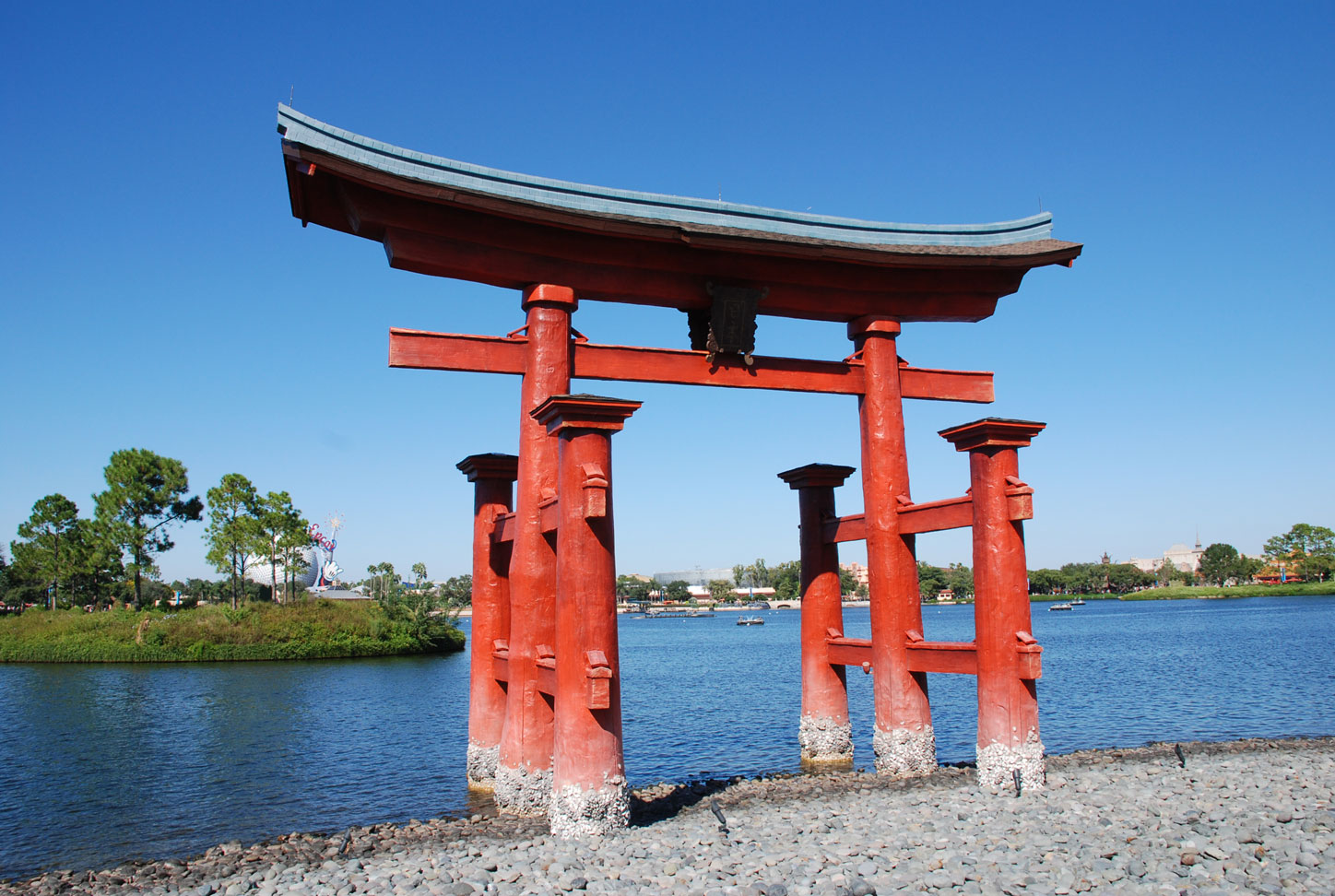
- The torii gate in front of the Japan pavilion, modelled after that of Itsukushima Shrine.

EPCOT
- Area: World Showcase
- Coordinates: 28.367443°N 81.550527°W
- Status: Operating
- Opening date: October 1, 1982

Ride statistics
- Attraction type: Themed pavilion
- Designer: Walt Disney Imagineering
- Theme: 伝統と革新の共存する調和の国・日本 (Japan: Land of Harmony, Where Tradition and Innovation Coexist)
- Sponsor: Mitsukoshi

Japan is a cultural pavilion representing the country of the same name as part of the World Showcase area of EPCOT at the Walt Disney World Resort near Orlando, Florida. Its location is between The American Adventure and Morocco pavilions.

== History ==
The Japan pavilion is one of the original World Showcase pavilions. It had been in planning since the late 1970s, and Disney worked closely with Japanese architects to ensure the accuracy of the buildings.

=== Planned attractions ===
Many attractions have been proposed for the pavilion and one show building was built, but left unused. Meet the World was one planned attraction and was a clone of the attraction Meet the World that was once at Tokyo Disneyland. However, management thought that the Japanese film's omission of World War II might upset many Veterans, it was dropped. The show was so close to opening that the show building and rotating platform was built, but not used.

Numerous attractions were planned and purposed. Only one (Meet the World) was constructed.

- For years, Imagineers have considered building an indoor roller coaster attraction based on Japan's Mount Fuji. The attraction would have been designed similarly to Matterhorn Bobsleds from Disneyland. The coaster would have been housed inside a replica of Mount Fuji. At one point, Godzilla or a large lizard attacking guests in their cars was considered. Fujifilm originally wanted to sponsor the ride in the early 1990s, but Kodak, a major EPCOT sponsor, convinced Disney to decline the sponsorship. Luckily, the Matterhorn derived design elements survived to be incorporated into Expedition Everest at Disney's Animal Kingdom Theme Park.
- Another proposed attraction was a walk-through version of Circle-Vision, in which guests would board and walk through a Shinkansen (bullet train) and look through windows (actually film screens) that showcase Japan's changing landscapes. The train would have shaken and moved like a train traveling through the countryside.
- Meet the World (from Tokyo Disneyland) was planned for the pavilion. Unlike the other attractions that did not make it past the planning stages, Meet the World's show building was constructed with the theater intended to be built on the second floor. However, due to miscalculations made in the building's design, the rotating theater put a lot of stress on the support beams. For the attraction to be able to function safely, the show building would have to have major rework done. As EPCOT construction was behind schedule, it was decided to move forward without the attraction. Today, the current space is used for rehearsals and storage.

== Layout ==
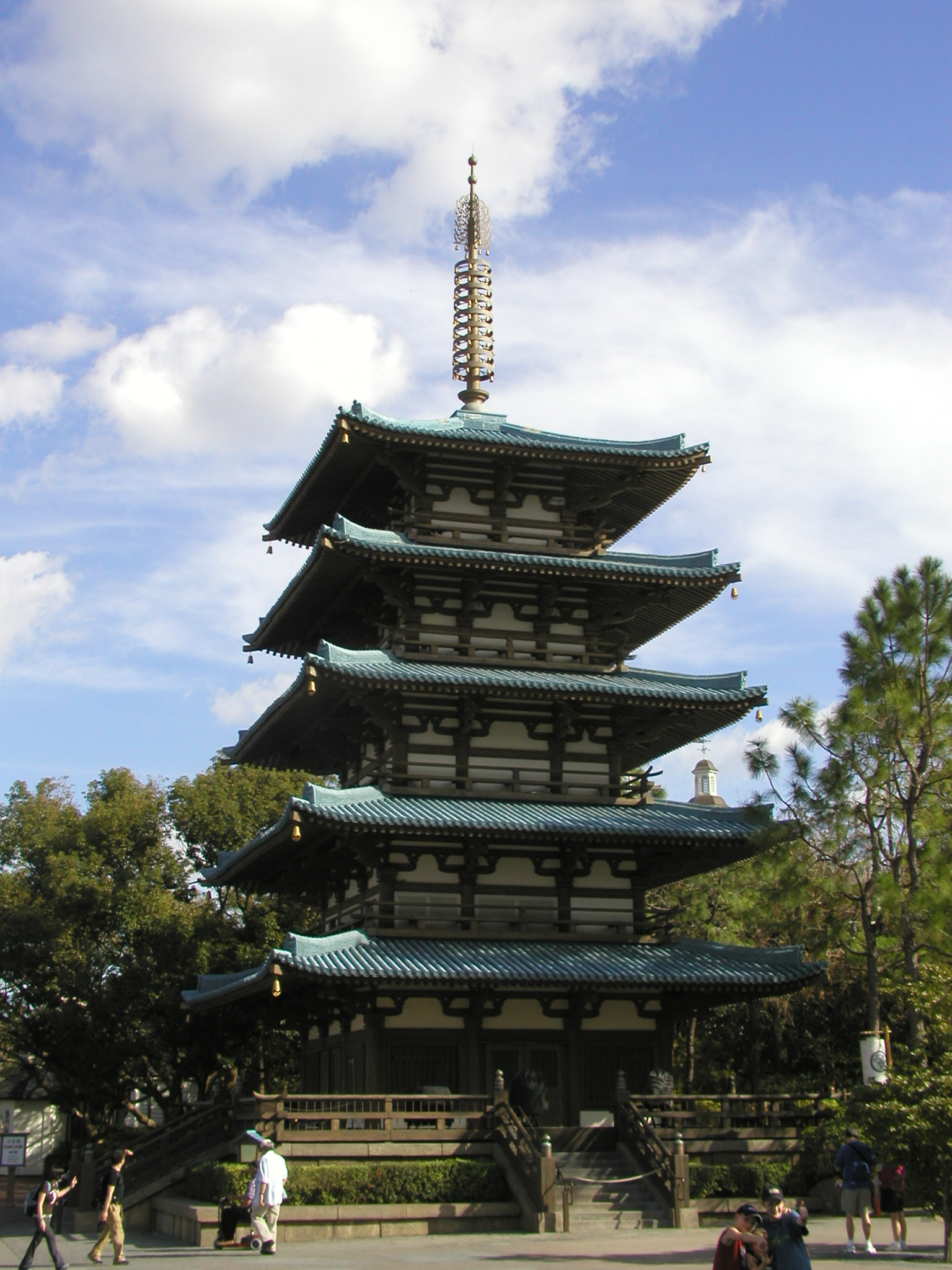
Pagoda resembling the Horyuji Temple at the Japan pavilion.

The Japan pavilion is made up of buildings surrounding a courtyard. The entrance to the courtyard features a Japanese pagoda based on the Horyuji Temple. A torii gate, modelled after that of Itsukushima Shrine, decorates the water in front of the pavilion. The area is filled with Japanese pools and gardens. At the end of the courtyard is the gate to a Japanese castle, including a moat, which leads into a display of Japanese culture.

== Attractions and services ==
=== Exhibitions ===
- Bijutsu-kan – An exhibition gallery hosting long-term exhibits on Japanese art and culture. Its current presentation, "Kawaii Life", features a look at Japan's "Culture of Cute."

=== Attractions ===
- EPCOT World Showcase Adventure
  - DuckTales World Showcase Adventure (2022–Present)

=== Former attractions ===
- EPCOT World Showcase Adventure
  - Kim Possible World Showcase Adventure (2009 – 2012)
  - Agent P's World Showcase Adventure (2012 – 2020)

=== Dining ===
- Teppan Edo is a teppanyaki-style restaurant, meaning that the food is cooked right in front of you at the table. The restaurant is directly above, and connected to, the Mitsukoshi department store. The decor and theming is intended to reflect the "vivaciousness" of the Edo period. Foods that are cooked on the table are steaks, chicken, shrimps, scallops, and vegetables. Select sushi rolls, miso soup, edamame, and tempura is offered as an appetizer, and various ice cream flavors, as well as mousses are options for dessert. Kids meal are served in monorail-shaped boxes.
- Katsura Grill: A counter-service restaurant located on a hill adjacent to the pagoda.
- Kabuki Cafe: Kaki-gori
- Garden House: Sake
- Takumi Tei
- Shiki-Sai: Sushi Izakaya

=== Former Dining ===
- Tokyo Dining: Originally occupied by two separate restaurants, Tempura Kiku and the Matsu No Ma lounge, Tokyo Dining is now a sushi restaurant. They serve sushi, tempura and some other grilled items (such as steak, grilled chicken and so on).
- Japan's Sake Bar

=== Shopping ===
- Mitsukoshi Department Store: The store is separated into four zones: Festivity, Silence, Harmony, and Interest, and sells many Japanese items, including clothing, jewelry, books, manga, anime items (such as posters), and toys. It has been expanded in recent years to include a far greater variety of items than before. More specifically, a greater portion of the store sells Japanese pop culture related items, presumably to take advantage of the growing interest in these types of products in America. To date, this is the only remaining branch of Mitsukoshi located in North America following the closure of Mitsukoshi's New York City location.

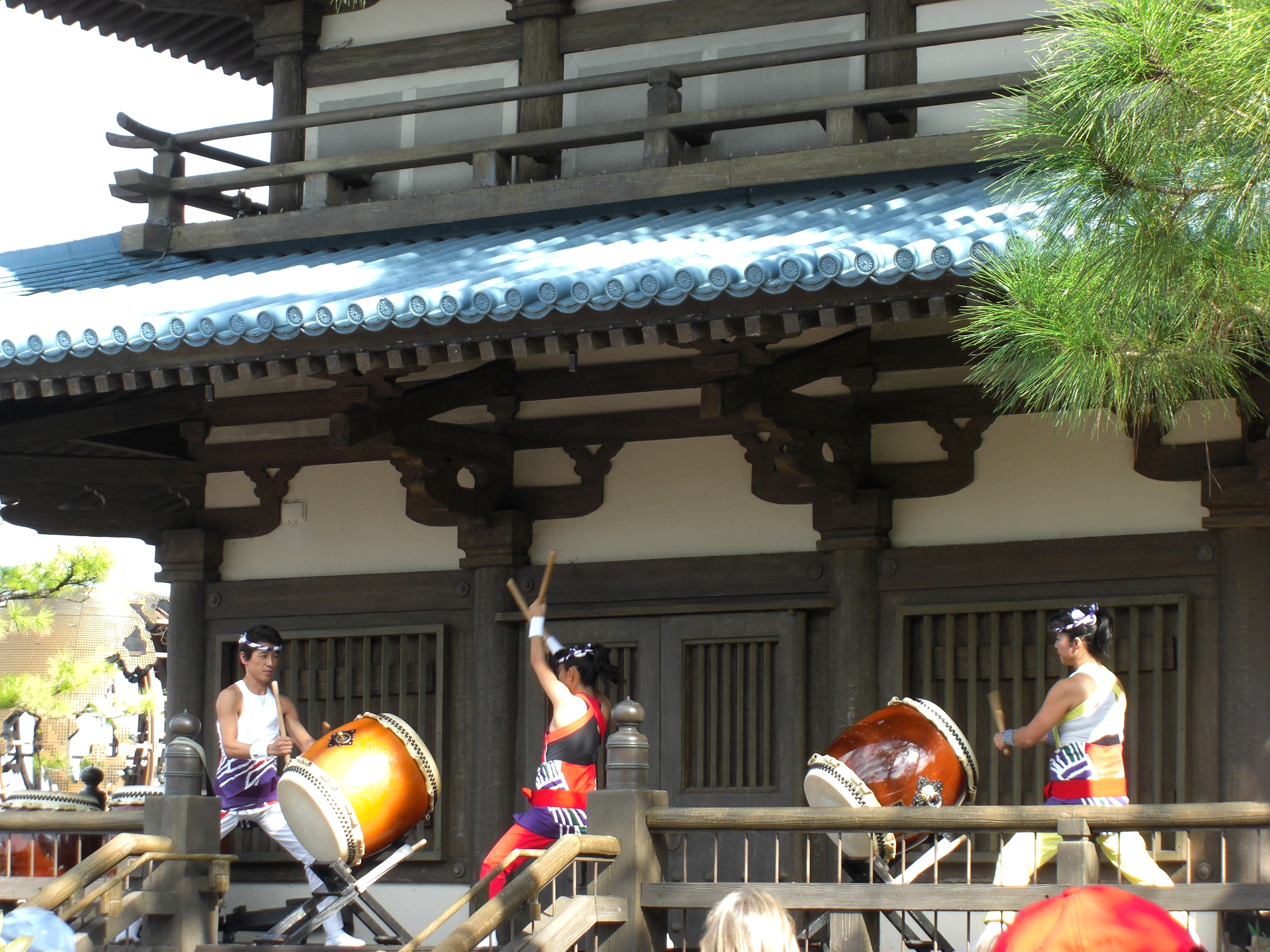
Matsuriza Taiko drummers at Epcot's Japan

=== Entertainment ===
==== Matsuriza ====
Matsuriza are traditional Taiko drummers and a Japanese Storytellers located at the base of the pagoda. Taiko performed at EPCOT began in 1983 when Kanto Abare Daiko became the first group to perform taiko at EPCOT. Eventually, in 1993, they left and were replaced by One World Taiko, consisting of Gary Tsujimoto and Nancy Ozaki, who were eventually joined by Matsuriza, and then replaced entirely by Matsuriza, who are the sole performing group at EPCOT to this day.

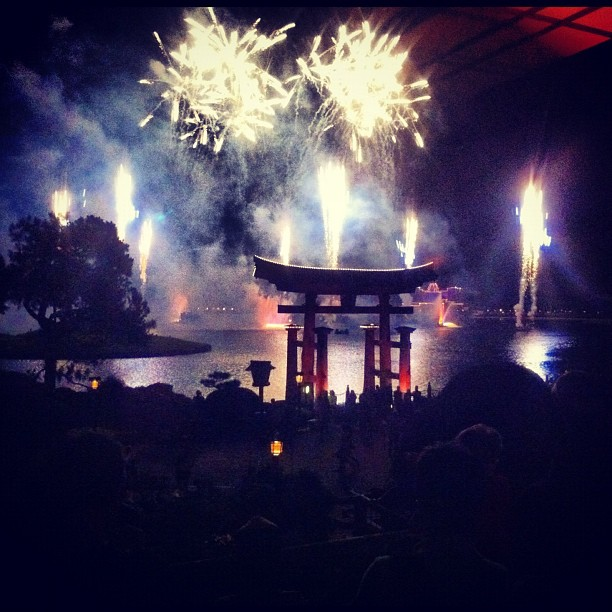
The show IllumiNations: Reflections of Earth as seen from the Japan pavilion
