= Harmonious (Epcot) =

Epcot nighttime show, 2021–2023

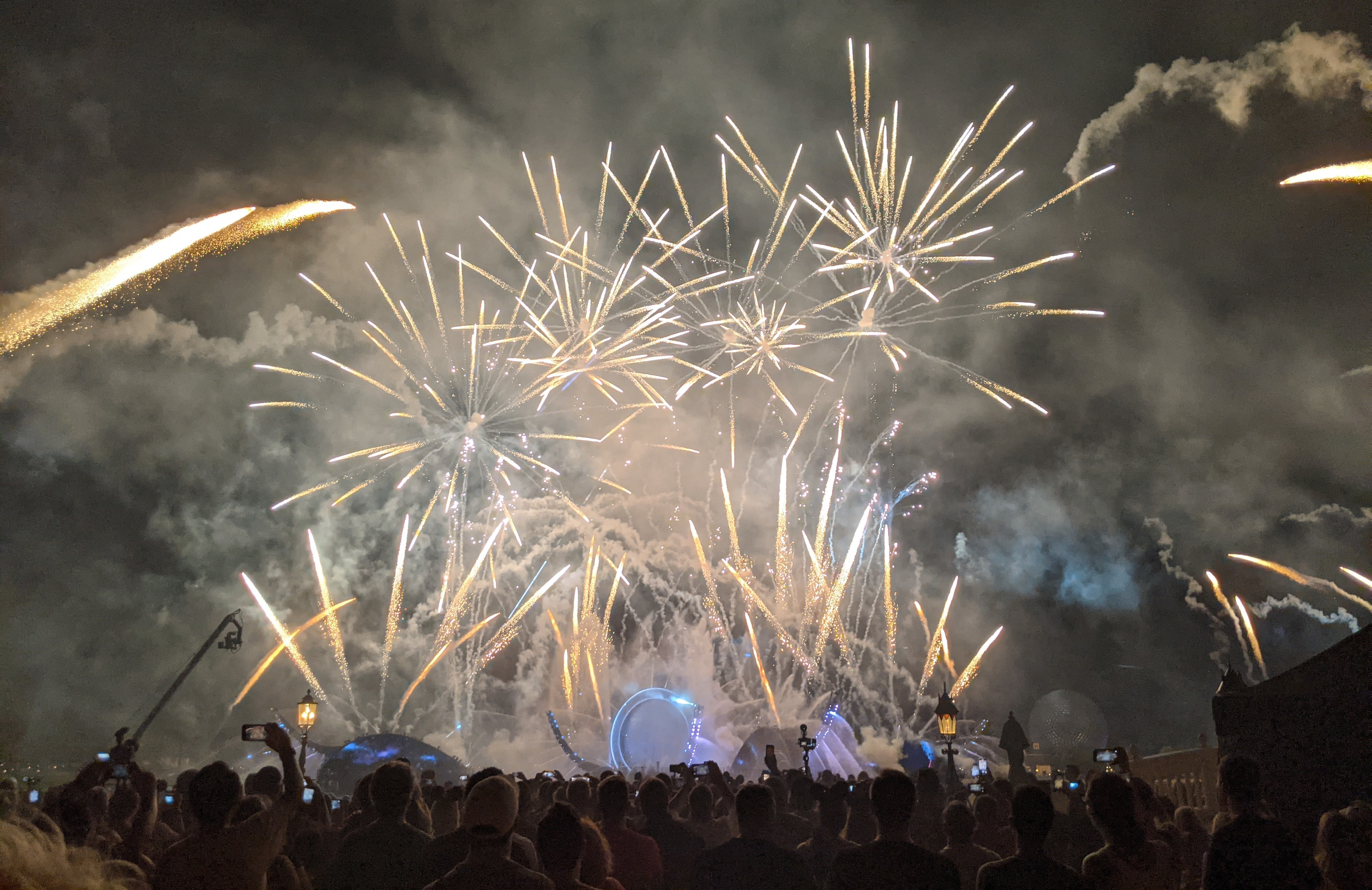
- Harmonious on opening night

Epcot
- Area: World Showcase (World Showcase Lagoon)
- Status: Removed
- Soft opening date: September 29, 2021
- Opening date: October 1, 2021
- Closing date: April 2, 2023
- Replaced: Epcot Forever
- Replaced by: Epcot Forever

Ride statistics
- Attraction type: Fireworks, laser, water, and light show
- Designer: Disney Live Entertainment
- Theme: Disney music and films in an international context
- Music: Various Artists (Music); Mark Hammond and Yaron Spiwak (Arrangements)
- Duration: 20 minutes
- Wheelchair accessible

Harmonious was a multimedia, fireworks-based nighttime spectacular at EPCOT at Walt Disney World Resort in Bay Lake, Florida. Intended as the long-term replacement for IllumiNations: Reflections of Earth, Harmonious showcased and celebrated the cultures and stories of the world that have inspired various Disney films and music, and how it can unite us all, overcoming any language or border. The show utilized pyrotechnics, choreographed water fountains, water curtains, lasers, searchlights, and LED screens to present a 360° audio-visual experience on the park's World Showcase Lagoon. The primary show equipment was notably housed on a collective of floating barges that were permanently moored at the center of the lagoon. Before its retirement, Harmonious was described as the largest nighttime spectacular ever created by Disney Live Entertainment.

Conceptualized by then-chairman of Disney Parks, Experiences and Products and former CEO of The Walt Disney Company, Bob Chapek, and developed further by Disney Live Entertainment under the direction of its vice president of parades and spectaculars, Steve Davison, Harmonious was a celebration of the Disney stories and songs that have inspired and empowered the world, emphasizing its ability to unite people from all walks of life. Told through reimagined and reinterpreted Disney visuals and music by 240 international artists, the show was divided into three chapters: "Gather", "Celebrate", and "Unite".

The show was announced at the biennial D23 Destination D event in 2018. Originally set to premiere in 2020 after the limited run of its direct predecessor Epcot Forever, the show was delayed to September 29, 2021, due to the COVID-19 pandemic.

On June 21, 2022, a livestream of the show was broadcast on Disney+, hosted by Idina Menzel with narration by Auliʻi Cravalho and the music performed by a live orchestra, choir, mariachi band, gospel choir, and singers. The livestream was removed from the service on May 26, 2023.

On September 11, 2022, at D23 Expo 2022, it was announced that Harmonious would be permanently replaced with another nighttime spectacular, Luminous: The Symphony of Us, which premiered on December 5, 2023, as part of Disney's centennial celebration. Harmonious played its final performance on April 2, 2023, two days after the culmination of Walt Disney World's 50th anniversary celebration, with Epcot Forever returning in its place the following night to begin preparations for Luminous.

== Show summary ==
=== Act I: Gather ===
The lit torches around the World Showcase Lagoon are extinguished and the park's lighting was dimmed. The show began with a female vocalizing to the tune of the EPCOT Anthem. A female narrator began speaking, as a clamor of voices vocalizing Disney arias and chants were heard:

"All around us, the world is alive with music. Voices calling out in search of one another, we find each other in song."

The clamor of voices then melded into a single crescendo and stopped, leading into a multi-lingual medley of "How Far I'll Go" from Moana and "Go the Distance" from Hercules sung in English, Mandarin Chinese, Norwegian, German, Arabic, Latin American Spanish, and Tahitian. High-launch fireworks shells were used, while the fountains took on multiple colors. Abstract, colorful images covered the screens, before eventually transforming into an image of the morning sun and its rays at the end of the act.

=== Act II: Celebrate ===
Guests were taken on a musical, globetrotting journey across many countries and regions through the prism of the Disney stories that take place in each one. The songs that represented each country or region were performed by local artists and partially in their respective mother tongues, with their accompanying visuals interpreted in a unique style reminiscent of, and directly inspired by, each region.

==== Middle East ====
This section celebrated the Middle Eastern folk tales that inspired Disney's Aladdin.

A laser image of the Sultan's palace from Aladdin was projected on the mist screens. Images of swirling sands covered the screens, which revealed the Genie's lamp on the perimeter screens and the Cave of Wonders on the central screen. The moving arms on the perimeter screens were raised to form part of the lamp as its "spout" where four pink firework shells were launched. On the central screen, the mouth of the Cave of Wonders opened wide and as the image zoomed forward, Arabic geometric patterns could be seen moving past. A dancing, stylized Genie (rendered in the style of Arabic calligraphy) appeared on the central screen and "summon[ed]" the launching fireworks. More moving geometric patterns covered the screens before revealing the rooftops of Agrabah at nighttime and a silhouetted Aladdin and Jasmine riding the magic carpet. The Genie then returned to "summon" more fireworks on the perimeter screens before moving to the central screen to close the section.

==== India ====
This section celebrated the ancient Indian fable texts that partly inspired The Jungle Book, which was adapted into the 1967 Disney animated film of the same name.

Several orange searchlights and lasers flashed as chanting and electronic beats played overhead. The lights, lasers, and fountains took on a light green color as large, spiraling leaves covered the central screen. The spiraling leaf cover on the screens then parted to reveal a Tholu bommalata shadow play retelling of The Jungle Book. Dancing puppets of Baloo, King Louie, Mowgli, and the other animal and human characters, as well as swirling Indian patterns, were displayed on the screens. The fountains, searchlights, and lasers displayed alternating light green, orange, and blue light effects. A set of colorful fireworks were launched to close the section, as the images on the screens disappeared in clouds of colorful smoke (similar to the ones used during the Holi festivities).

==== China ====
This section celebrated the Chinese legends and literature that inspired Disney's Mulan.

A traditional Chinese painting of a magnolia tree's branches and its falling flowers covered the screens. Continuing the motif, the characters of Mulan, Fa Zhou, Mushu, a riding Chinese army, and various Chinese landscapes covered the screens. The fountains were lit in white and pink. A red and white laser image of the Taijitu symbol also appeared above the perimeter screens, as the music changed dramatically. The fountains were lit in red, as the screens displayed real-life martial artists performing movements from Chinese martial arts against an intense red background. In addition to fireworks shells, firecrackers were also launched from the moving arms to create a "firecracker storm" above the central screen. The section closed with images of Mulan in her traditional pink and blue hanfu and her warrior disguise on the perimeter screens, and an image of her riding Khan (her horse) on the central screen.

==== Africa ====
This section celebrated the African landscapes and fauna that inspired Disney's The Lion King.

An African tapestry of a young Simba appearedon the center screen, lit by circling pink, red, and purple fountains. Continuing the tapestry motif, a growing Simba was then seen traveling with Timon and Pumbaa and traversed the African landscape day and night across the screens. The fountains were lit in blue and red. A spinning continental map of Africa was then displayed on the central screen, while the animals of the Pride Lands could be seen traveling towards it on the perimeter screens. Red and green fireworks were shot off periodically to the beat of the music, while the fountains displayed blue and purple effects. A now-adult Simba and Nala could be seen frolicking in the forest, before the former encountered the spirit of Mufasa on the central screen and on the mist screen above it (through laser projection). The section closed with the images of Rafiki holding up a cub Simba over Pride Rock as Mufasa and Sarabi watch on the central screen and the animals bowed to him on the perimeter screens, as several red and green high-launch fireworks went off.

==== Europe ====
The Europe section was divided into two subsections. The first subsection celebrated the French literature that inspired two Disney films: Beauty and the Beast (adapted into the 1991 animated film of the same name) and The Hunchback of Notre-Dame (adapted into the 1996 animated film of the same name). The second subsection celebrated the Scottish mythology that has inspired Pixar's Brave.

Misty and dream-like images of Belle and the Beast slowly dancing in the ballroom covered the center screen, as a laser image of a rose appeared above the central screen and dropped a petal. The fountains were first lit in blue and pulsing yellow, and then red as the laser image changed into a heart. A singular perimeter firework was shot from the top of the America Gardens Theatre through the laser heart, and the images on the screens zoomed out to reveal stained glass windows (similar to those found in Notre-Dame de Paris) depicting Quasimodo and the cathedral itself. The fountains displayed blue, pink, and white effects. Several high-launch fireworks were used in this subsection, in addition to large white fireworks.

The Ring of Stones was laser-projected above the central screen. As the fountains' blue lights were flickering, several will-o'-the-wisps appeared on the screens, followed by wisps of red wavy hair. Animated woven tapestries depicting Merida, her family, the 3 clan leaders, and her family's crest were then displayed on the screens. The fountains were lit in brown and highlighted by green searchlights (depicting trees), before changing to a flickering blue and yellow. Several green and white fireworks were launched. The section closed with Merida riding Angus (her horse) across the perimeter screens and shooting an arrow to a target on the central screen, which triggered a set of green fireworks to go off.

==== Latin America ====
This section celebrated the Latin American (specifically Mexican) cultural traditions that inspired Pixar's Coco, except for Disney's Saludos Amigos.

A close-up image of a self-strumming guitar displayed across the screens opened the section, before transitioning to the Rivera family ofrenda (a home altar used during the Día de Muertos celebrations) lit with candles and filled with flowers. The fountains were lit in yellow and orange to depict the candles. The cempasuchil (Mexican marigold) bridges then covered the screens, before changing into hung strings of colorful papel picado (decorative banners) with animated elements. The moving fountains displayed colorful water effects, specifically blue, yellow, red, pink, violet, and peach effects. The screens then changed to show the swooshing folkorico skirts of real-life Mexican folk dancers, colorful calaveras (sugar skulls), and a close-up image of Pepita (Mamá Imelda's alebrije) with her wings unfurled. Multiple colorful fireworks, as well as high-launch ones, were used throughout the section. The section closed with a motif-pattern of colorful guitars and Miguel strumming a guitar while cempasuchil petals flew around him.

==== U.S.A. ====
This section celebrated aspects of African-American culture that inspired Disney's The Princess and the Frog.

Silhouetted images of a young and adult Tiana wishing on the Evening Star could be seen on the screens, as well as images of the bayou of New Orleans filled with fireflies. The fountains displayed bright purple and blue effects. As the music changed to be more upbeat, Louis the Alligator could be seen on the central screen playing his trumpet as laser images of colorful music notes are projected on the mist screens above. Fantastical imagery of the bayou and its dancing inhabitants (including Tiana and Naveen in their frog forms) — inspired by the work of Harlem Renaissance artist Aaron Douglas — then covered the screens, as flashing purple fountains, yellow and orange searchlights, and launched white fireworks moved to the music. The setting on the screens then changed to show downtown New Orleans, including a paddle steamer and several streetcars. The fountains were lit in blue, while purple, blue, orange, and yellow searchlights colored the skies. A flyer advertising "Tiana's Place" flew into view as the setting changed into a recreation of the "Almost There" sequence from the film. Multiple large, colorful firework shells, as well as several comets, were launched during this segment. Flashing pink and yellow and blue and green searchlights accentuated the scene. Silhouetted figures of The Firefly Five Plus Lou band, as well as a dancing Naveen in his human form, could also be seen on the perimeter screens. More colorful fireworks were launched as Tiana danced on the central screen while falling shimmering gold dust covered the perimeter screens to close the section.

=== Act III: Unite ===
A vocalizing reprise of the EPCOT Anthem led into a soaring version of "Someday" from The Hunchback of Notre Dame. Select artists performed each verse, and another comet flew to the center of the lagoon from the roof of the American Gardens Theater. The narrator intoned:

"You raise your voice and it's enough to lift the human spirit. Set the song inside you soaring, and the whole wide world will hear it."

A laser heart was projected over the central barge, which slowly morphed into a flying dove of peace; a globe appeared on the water curtain and all the screens around it. All the artists joined as fireworks were launched in and around the lagoon. As the song crescendoed, it abruptly cut to three seconds of darkness and silence before climaxing in a bright array of fireworks, voices, and light.

=== Post-show ===
The show ended with a farewell message from the narrator:

"Wherever the world leads you next, we hope you carry a song with you. And know, that the promise of someday, begins inside of you today. Good night."

An instrumental version of "Someday" then played as guests exited the park. It was then followed by an upbeat medley of song samples from the show, including "Circle of Life", the EPCOT Anthem, "Arabian Nights", "Saludos Amigos", and "The World Es Mi Familia". While the perimeter screens were covered with spinning stars, the central screen showed corresponding key visuals for each song sample. For Walt Disney World's 50th Anniversary celebration, the medley was followed by a version of "The Magic Is Calling", the celebration's anthem.

== Show elements ==
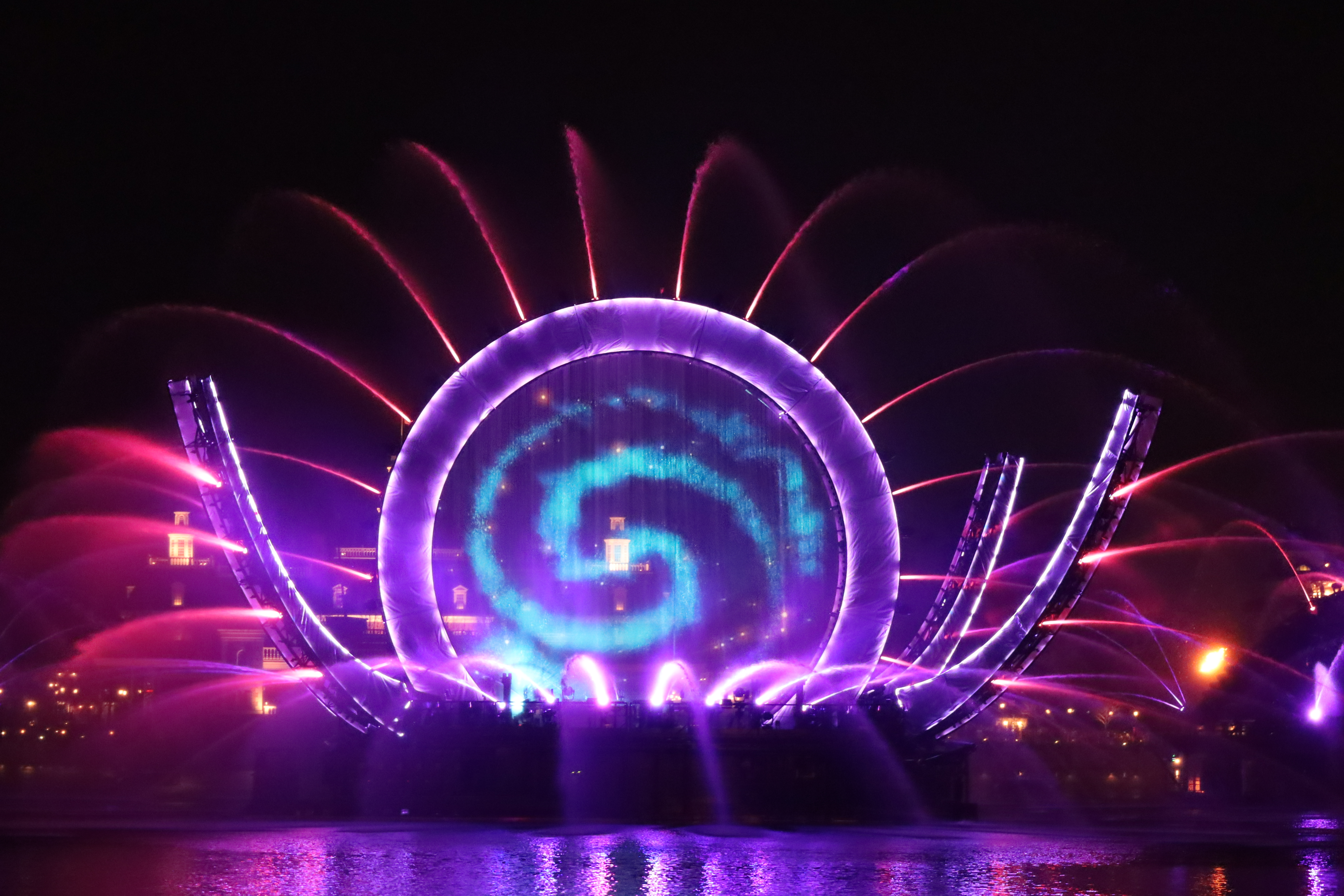
The show's centerpiece platform with water curtain and fountain nozzles activated, as seen during the post show sequence.

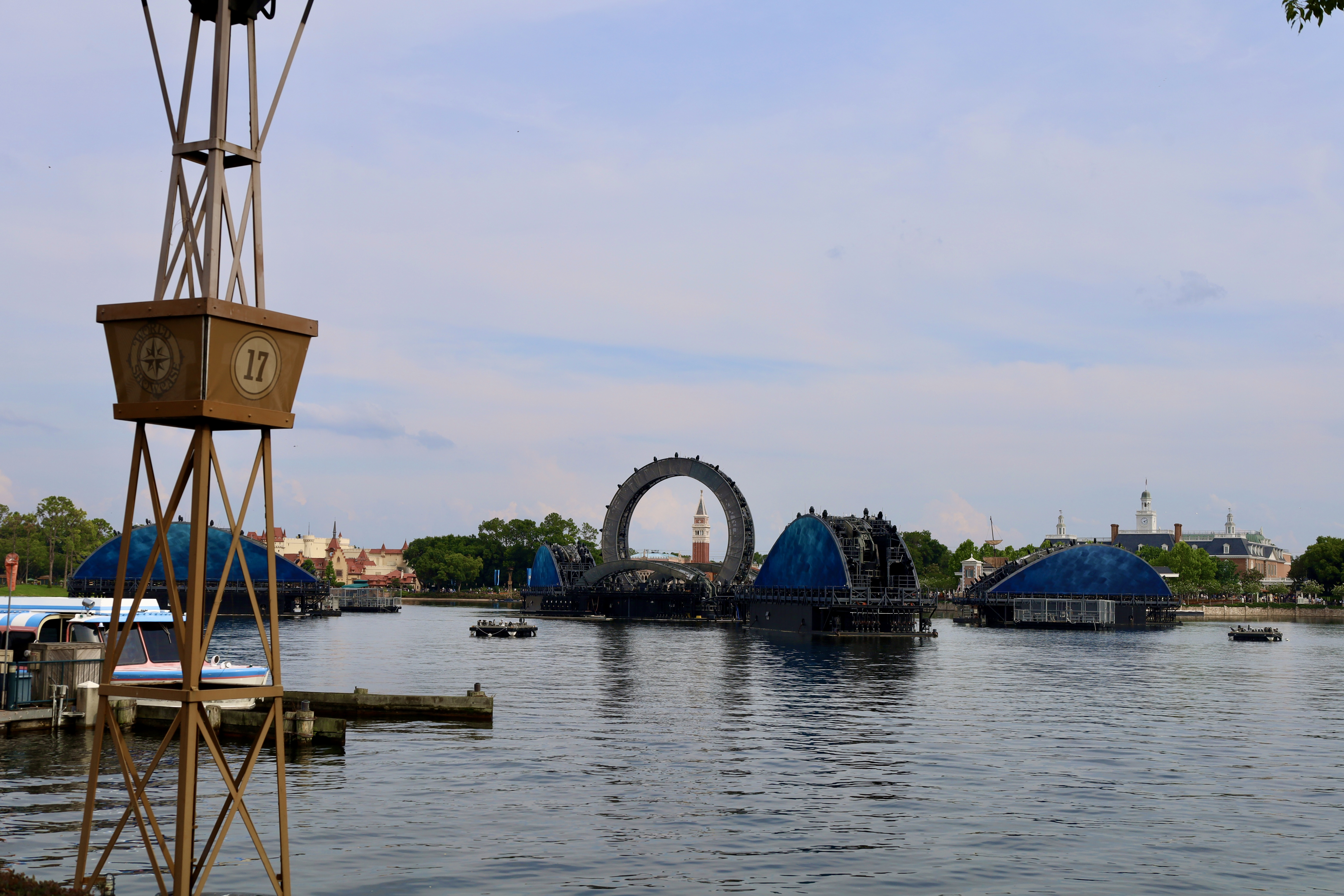
The show's five main barges seen during the daytime.

Harmonious shared similar show equipment with the former IllumiNations: Reflections of Earth show as well as its predecessors, including the usage of pyrotechnics, choreographed water fountains, lasers, searchlights, floating set pieces, and LED screens.

=== Compass ===
The show's primary show equipment was housed on a collective of floating barges known as the "compass", named as such due to its positioning on the World Showcase Lagoon. Four of these barges held the arc-shaped and double-sided LED screens that measured 25 feet (7.6 m) high and 88 feet (27 m) long. These barges formed the perimeter of the barge collective and were positioned in the ordinal directions. Each barge was named after the nearest intersecting World Showcase pavilion: Mexico (pointing northeast), Germany (southeast), Canada (northwest), and France (southwest). The centerpiece platform, positioned at the center of the collective, held a six-story tall ring structure where a high-density water curtain, moving lights, and several water fountains were installed. In addition, 8 moving arms that measured 54 feet (16 m) long were placed either between (for the perimeter barges) or in front and behind (for the central barge) to support more show equipment and were choreographed to move along as the show progressed.

As the collective of barges was too large to store in the backstage marina (located behind the Refreshment Outpost quick service restaurant and between the China and Germany pavilions), they remained semi-permanently moored at the center of the lagoon. At daytime, the perimeter screens were turned on to show the undersea imagery from Act I with the Walt Disney World 50th Anniversary logo periodically appearing and disappearing. Initially, the plan was to simply turn on the fountains to add to the ambiance of World Showcase, but this did not materialize due to spray from the fountains on nearby paths.

== Special editions ==
=== New Year's Eve Countdown Edition ===
This segment, which was a tag after IllumiNations: Reflections of Earth, was used as a standalone show in New Year's Eve 2021 and 2022 titled Cheers to the New Year: A Sparkling Celebration, using the show's materials and barges, which is part of Walt Disney World's 50th Anniversary celebration.

=== Fourth of July ===
On July 4, 2022, the Independence Day tag as titled The Heartbeat of Freedom that was used from 2006 to 2019 for IllumiNations: Reflections of Earth was used again after the show's regular performance, enhanced with the new technology brought about by the show's infrastructure, which was part of Walt Disney World's 50th Anniversary celebration.

== Music ==
Harmonious: Globally Inspired Music from the EPCOT Nighttime Spectacular

Soundtrack album by Various Artists
- Released: October 29, 2021
- Studio: Abbey Road Studios
- Length: 23:10
- Label: Walt Disney
- Producer: Mark Hammond; Yaron Spiwak; Matt Walker

=== Soundtrack ===
Unique to the musical score of Harmonious was the involvement of over 240 musicians, composers, arrangers, vocalists and more from nine countries in its creation and development. In addition, Disney worked with different cultural consultants to ensure that a more authentic sound was achieved in the reinterpretation of various Disney songs. Featured songwriters in the Harmonious score include Kristen Anderson-Lopez, Elton John, Robert Lopez, Alan Menken, Lin-Manuel Miranda, Randy Newman, and Stephen Schwartz. The score was orchestrated by David Hamilton, a frequent collaborator of music producer Mark Hammond, particularly from World of Color.

The entire soundtrack for the show, with selected extended musical sequences and without the show's narration, was released in a soundtrack album by Walt Disney Records on October 29, 2021.

=== Track listing ===
No.	Title	Writer(s)	Performer(s)	Length
1.	"Opening Chants" (Composed of the "EPCOT Anthem", "Tulou Tagaloa" from Moana, "Part of Your World" from The Little Mermaid, "Vuelie" from Frozen, "Circle of Life" from The Lion King, and "The Bells of Notre Dame" from The Hunchback of Notre Dame)	Pinar Toprak, Opetaia Foa'i, Alan Menken, Frode Fjellheim, Christophe Beck, Hans Zimmer, Lebo M, and Stephen Schwartz	Harmonious World Ensemble	1:43
2.	"Awakening" (Composed of "How Far I'll Go" from Moana and "Go the Distance" from Hercules)	Lin-Manuel Miranda, Alan Menken, and David Zippel	Harmonious World Ensemble, Danny Gokey, and Elisha Garrett	2:54
3.	"Middle East" (Composed of "Arabian Nights" from Aladdin)	Alan Menken, Howard Ashman, Pasek and Paul	Harmonious World Ensemble, Ninet Tayeb, Jorgie Shkara, and Sanaa Marahati	1:24
4.	"India" (Composed of "The Bare Necessities'" and I Wan'na Be Like You from The Jungle Book)	Robert B. and Richard M. Sherman	Harmonious World Ensemble, Aditya Rao, and Gaayatri Kaundinya	1:27
5.	"China" (Composed of "Reflection" from Mulan)	Matthew Wilder and David Zippel	Wang Liu Qi and Hollie Hammel	2:38
6.	"Africa" (Composed of "I Just Can't Wait to Be King", "Hakuna Matata" and "Can You Feel the Love Tonight" from The Lion King)	Elton John, Tim Rice	Ndlovu Youth Choir	2:16
7.	"Europe" (Composed of "Main Title: Prologue" from Beauty and the Beast, "Hellfire", "Out There" from The Hunchback of Notre Dame; "Touch the Sky" from Brave, and "Let It Go" from Frozen)	Alan Menken, Stephen Schwartz, Alex Mandel, Mark Andrews, Kristen Anderson-Lopez, and Robert Lopez	Harmonious World Ensemble, Carlos Santiago, Damien Sargue, Lindsey Stirling, and Máiréad Nesbitt	2:27
8.	"Latin America" (Composed of "Un Poco Loco (Intro)", "Remember Me" from Coco, "Saludos Amigos" from Saludos Amigos, "The World Es Mi Familia", and "Crossing the Marigold Bridge" from Coco)	Germaine Franco, Adrian Molina, Kristen Anderson-Lopez, Robert Lopez, Ned Washington, Charles Wolcott, and Michael Giacchino	Luis Fonsi and Joy	2:33
9.	"U.S.A." (Composed of "Dig A Little Deeper" from The Princess and the Frog)	Randy Newman	Karen Clark Sheard, Kierra Sheard, Bryson Camper, and Harmonious Gospel Choir	2:42
10.	"Finale" (Composed of "Someday" from The Hunchback of Notre Dame and "EPCOT Anthem")	Alan Menken, Stephen Schwartz, and Pinar Toprak	Harmonious World Ensemble	3:06
Total length:				23:10

== See also ==
- Disneyland Forever
- Fantasmic!
- Rivers of Light
- World of Color
