= Epcot Forever =

Epcot fireworks show, 2019–2023

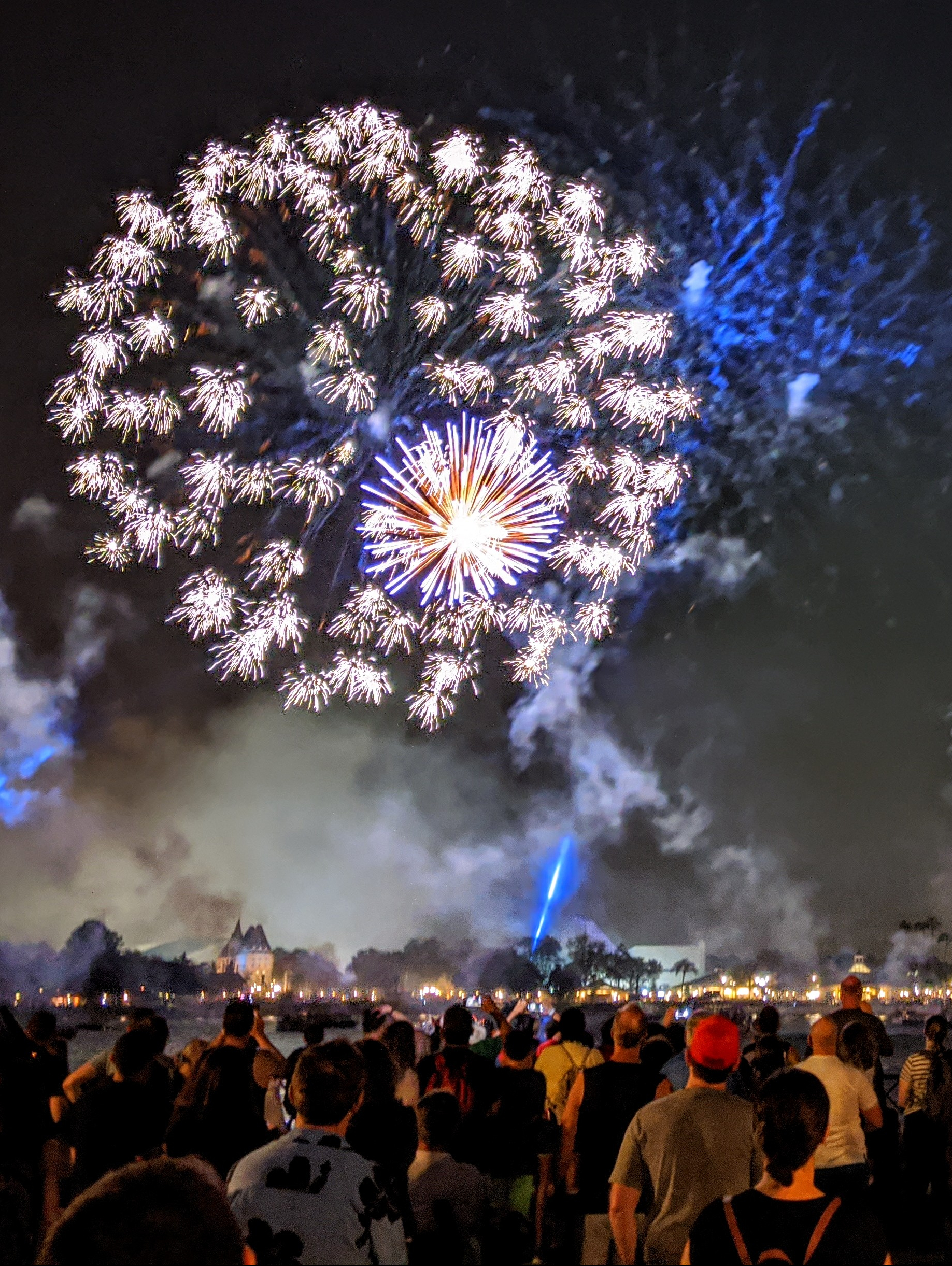

Epcot
- Area: World Showcase (World Showcase Lagoon)
- Status: Removed
- Opening date: October 1, 2019 (original); April 3, 2023 (updated)
- Closing date: September 28, 2021 (original); December 4, 2023 (updated)
- Replaced: IllumiNations: Reflections of Earth (original); Harmonious (updated)
- Replaced by: Harmonious (original); Luminous The Symphony of Us (updated)

Ride statistics
- Attraction type: Fireworks show
- Designer: Disney Live Entertainment
- Theme: The past, present, and future of Epcot
- Assistive listening available

Epcot Forever was a limited-time fireworks show that premiered on October 1, 2019, at Epcot. Epcot Forever served as an interim replacement for IllumiNations: Reflections of Earth until its long-term replacement, Harmonious, premiered in 2021. It took the form of a celebration of Epcot's musical history. The show celebrated the park's 37-year history, featuring fireworks, music, lighting, lasers, and special effects kites set to new arrangements of music originating from some of the park's classic attractions, such as Journey Into Imagination, Spaceship Earth, Soarin', Tapestry of Nations and Universe of Energy. The show was also made to celebrate the past, present, and future of Epcot.

The show closed on March 16, 2020, due to the COVID-19 pandemic, but reopened on June 29, 2021, alongside the return of the Happily Ever After fireworks show. However, on January 10, 2023, Disney announced the show will temporarily return to Epcot beginning April 3, 2023 until December 4, 2023, as part of Disney's centennial celebration, replacing its successor, Harmonious, which then played its last show the night prior.

== Show summary ==
Epcot Forever is structured around medley of Epcot music and the voices of children quoting different attractions, with some archival audio of Walt Disney from the EPCOT film also being incorporated into the opening and closing.

- Opening
  - "Legacy" (Epcot entrance plaza theme)
  - "One Little Spark" (from Journey into Imagination)
  - "We've Just Begun to Dream" (from EPCOT Center Grand Opening)
- Act I: Innovation ("Welcome to the future... or, should I say, your future!" – Spaceship Earth)
  - "New Horizons" (from Horizons)
  - "Universe of Energy" (from Universe of Energy)
  - "Listen to the Land" (from Listen to the Land)
  - "New Horizons" (reprise, from Horizons)
- Act II: Exploration ("Soarin' to tower, we are ready for takeoff!" – Soarin')
  - "Tomorrow's Child" (from Spaceship Earth)
  - "Soarin' Over California" (from Soarin')
  - "Magic Journeys" (from Magic Journeys)
  - "Tomorrow's Child" (reprise, from Spaceship Earth)
- Act III: Imagination ("And so, as you can plainly see, imagination works best when it's set free!" – Journey Into Imagination)
  - "One Little Spark" (reprise, from Journey into Imagination with Figment)
  - "Makin' Memories" (from Magic Journeys pre-show)
  - "Veggie, Veggie, Fruit, Fruit" (from Kitchen Kabaret)
  - "It's Fun to Be Free" (from World of Motion)
- Act IV: Celebration ("May peace go with you forever and ever as you celebrate the future hand in hand" – Tapestry of Nations)
  - "Tapestry of Nations" (from Tapestry of Nations)
  - "Golden Dream" (from The American Adventure)
  - "Celebrate the Future Hand in Hand" (from the Walt Disney World Millennium Celebration)
- Act V: Finale
  - "One Little Spark" (reprise with new lyrics, from Journey into Imagination with Figment)
  - "A Whole New World" (from Aladdin)

== Special editions ==
=== New Year's Eve Countdown Edition ===
On December 31, 2019, this segment continued to be used after IllumiNations: Reflections of Earth, which is the tag returned on New Year's Eve 2020.

=== Fourth of July ===
On July 4, 2023, the Independence Day tag as titled The Heartbeat of Freedom that was used from 2006 to 2019 for IllumiNations: Reflections of Earth and 2022 for Harmonious was used once again after the show's regular performance, which is part of The Walt Disney Company's centennial celebration.
