= IllumiNations: Reflections of Earth =

Former nighttime show at Epcot

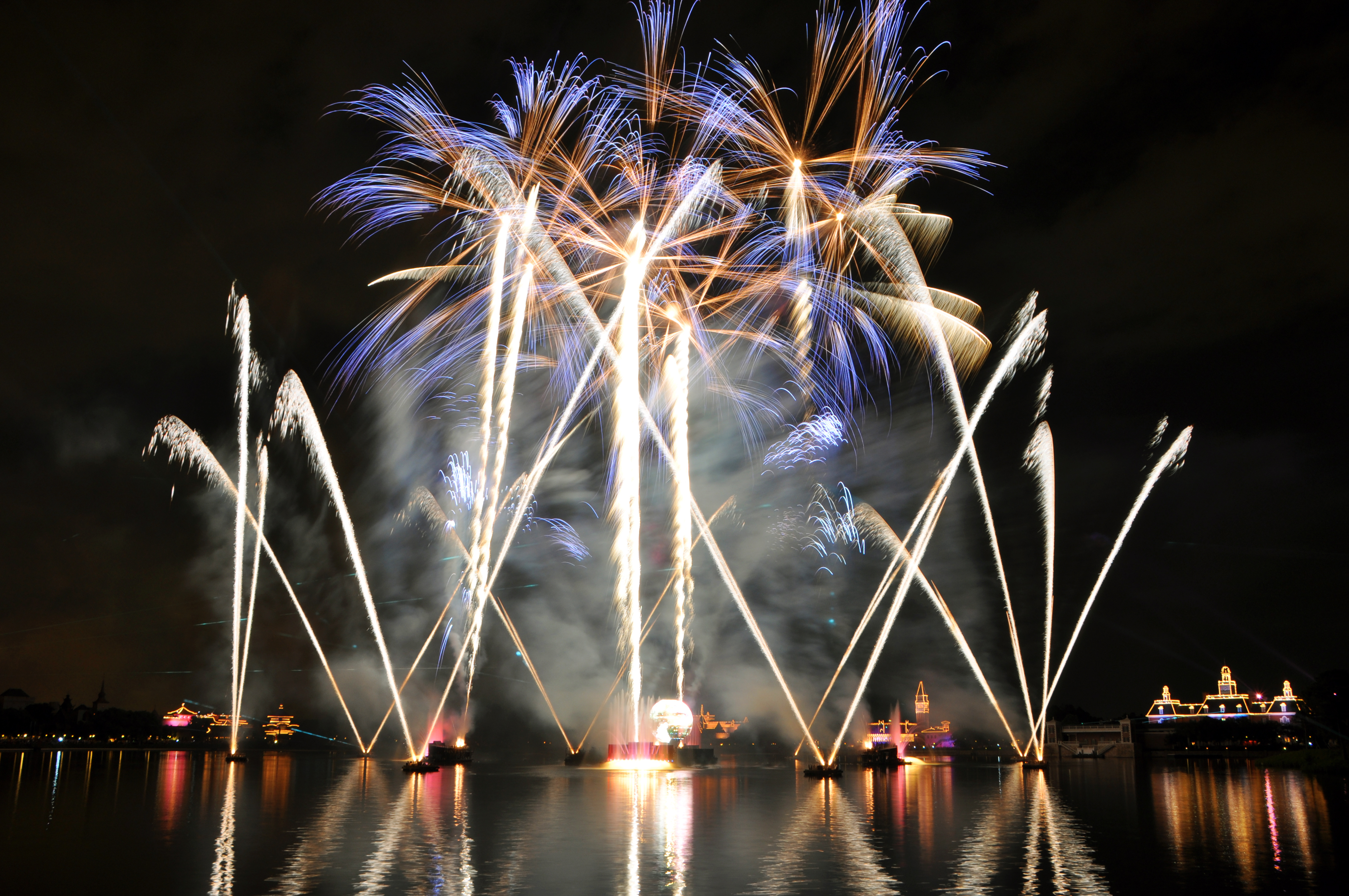

Epcot
- Area: World Showcase (World Showcase Lagoon)
- Status: Removed
- Cost: US$25,000 per show
- Soft opening date: September 22, 1999
- Opening date: October 1, 1999
- Closing date: September 30, 2019
- Replaced: IllumiNations '98
- Replaced by: Epcot Forever

Ride statistics
- Attraction type: Fireworks, laser, water, fire, and light show
- Designer: Walt Disney Creative Entertainment
- Theme: Story of Earth/New Millennium Celebration (2000)
- Music: Gavin Greenaway
- Site area: 21,120 sq ft (1,962 m^{2})
- Propulsion: Conventional fireworks with limited additional Air Launch Fireworks technology
- Sponsors: General Electric (1999–2003) Siemens (2005–2017)
- Firework shells: 2,800
- Previous name: IllumiNations 2000: Reflections of Earth (1999–2001)
- Fastpass+ was available
- Wheelchair accessible
- Assistive listening available

IllumiNations: Reflections of Earth was a nighttime show performed nightly at Epcot at the Walt Disney World Resort in Bay Lake, Florida. The show utilized fireworks, pyrotechnics, water fountains, fire effects, lasers, searchlights, and a large rotating globe with curved LED screens to create a visual production on the park's World Showcase Lagoon.

The show told the story of Earth and was divided into three movements titled "Chaos," "Order," and "Meaning", emphasizing the idea of humanity as a single unified tribe on this planet. The lagoon was surrounded by nineteen large torches signifying the first 19 centuries of the common era, and the show culminated in the globe opening like a lotus blossom to reveal a twentieth torch, representing the now-completed 20th century.

Created and directed by Don Dorsey, the show premiered on October 1, 1999, as IllumiNations 2000: Reflections of Earth as part of the Walt Disney World Millennium Celebration. It was so successful that after the celebration ended, the 2000 was dropped from the name and the show continued. The show has received several awards throughout the years including 11 straight Best Outdoor Night Production Show Golden Ticket Awards (2005–2015). The show's final performance was on September 30, 2019. It was initially replaced by Epcot Forever which premiered on October 1, 2019, and later by Harmonious which premiered on September 29, 2021. A week after the last-ever show, the globe was disassembled and destroyed and sent to a scrapyard.

IllumiNations and the versions of the productions before it remain the only Disney nighttime spectaculars at EPCOT that did not feature any intellectual company property (other than their original songs) and focus solely on cultural soundtracks that honor the countries represented in World Showcase.

== Show summary ==
=== Introduction ===
Torches were lit around the lagoon. The beginning of the show was narrated by Jim Cummings:

Good evening. On behalf of Walt Disney World, the place where dreams come true, we welcome all of you to Epcot and World Showcase. We've gathered here tonight around the fire as people of all lands have gathered for thousands and thousands of years before us... to share the light... and to share a story. An amazing story as old as time itself, but still being written. And though each of us has our own individual stories to tell, a true adventure emerges when we bring them all together as one. We hope you enjoy our story tonight: Reflections of Earth.

The original narration substituted the first two sentences with "Good evening and welcome" but was changed for the Year of a Million Dreams.

Immediately after, there was the sound of a flame being gently blown out, the lighting was immediately lowered throughout the World Showcase Lagoon, and the show began.

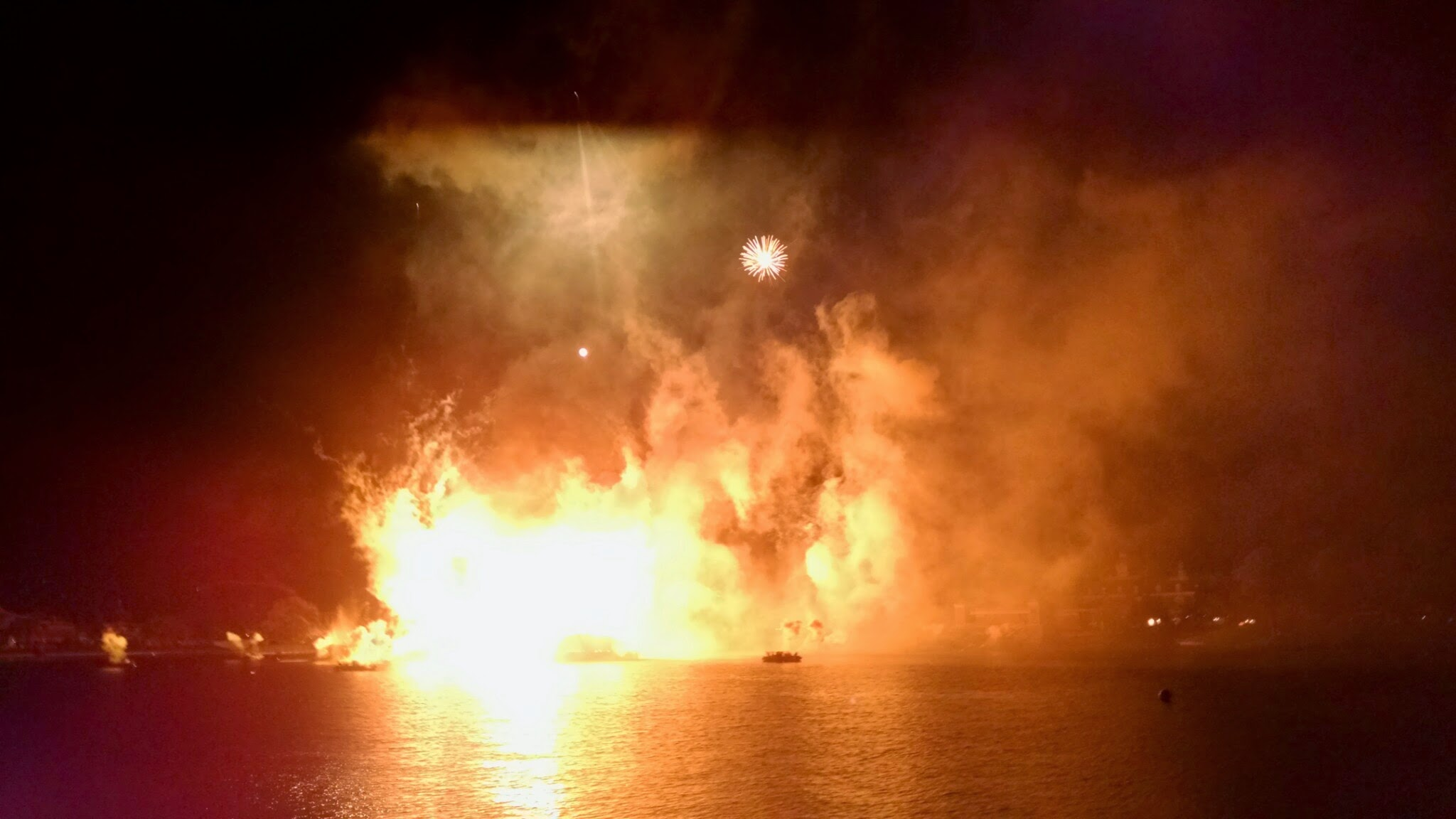
The Inferno Barge during Act I

=== Act I: Chaos (The Earth Is Born) ===
Chaos represents the creation of the planet Earth. Once the torches are extinguished, the thud of a drum is heard. The sound repeats, accelerating in tempo until a singular perimeter firework shot from the top of the America Gardens Theatre streaks halfway across the lagoon, colliding with another firework, exploding in a huge circular shape that recreates the big bang, right in time with the music. Explosive fireworks and hot flames from the Inferno Barge engulf the lagoon. The side fountains add colors of red, orange, and yellow. At the end of the segment, large white fireworks exploded and small white points would glow at various places on the lagoon surface like a field of stars.

=== Act II: Order (The Triumph of Life) ===
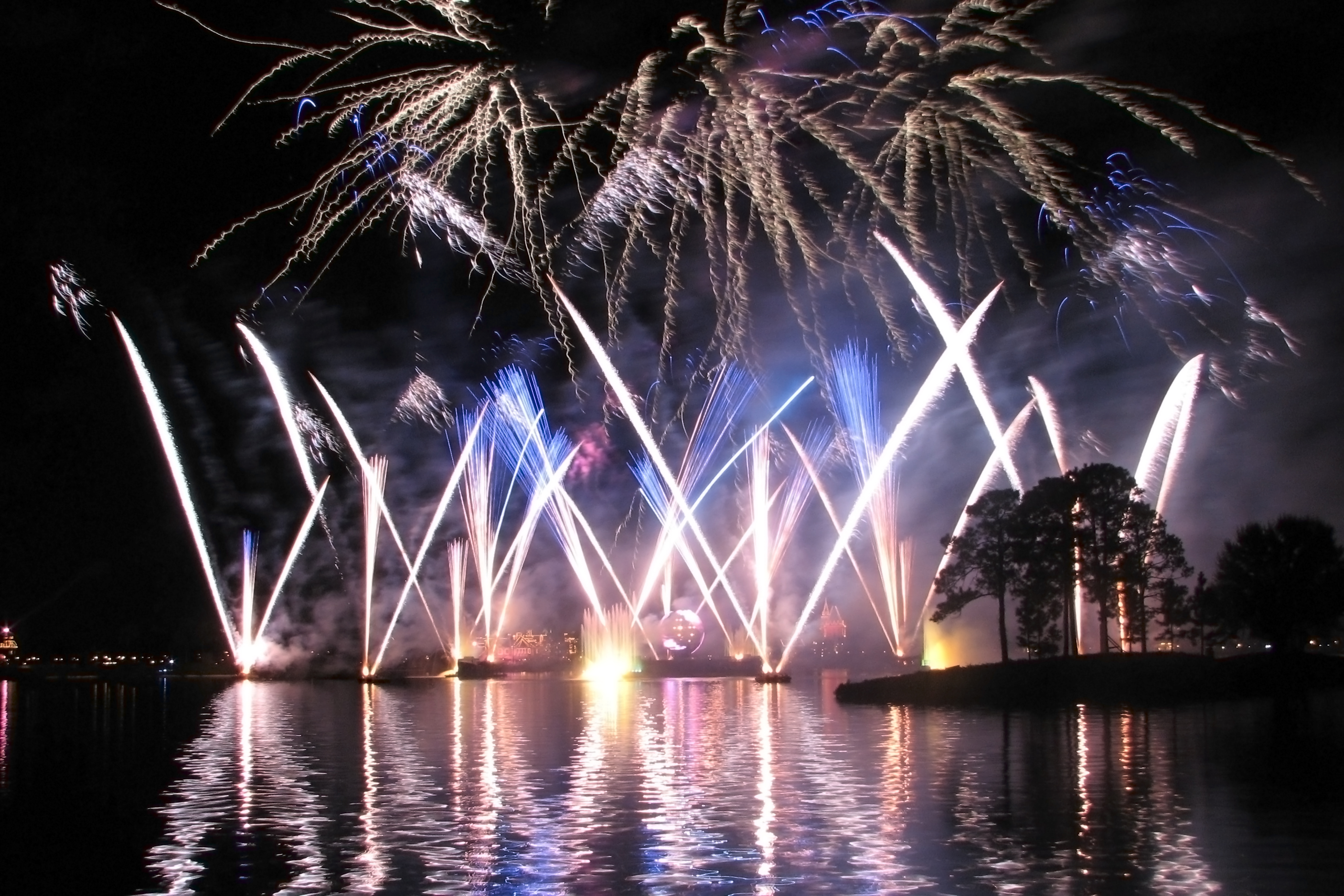
Firework launch during the "Celebration" segment in Act II

==== Space ====
The spouting flames from the Flame Barge were reduced to a low sputter, as a blue colored laser covered the sky above the lagoon. The Earth Globe, covered in a dim glow of white began to slowly glide across the lagoon to the center, accompanied by colored water effects emanating from the side fountains. As the Earth cools, the fountain color changed from hot white to red, ending on blue.

==== Life ====
Images of trees, flowers, and animals covered the Earth Globe. The side fountains displayed green water effects. A video of a horse running in a field fades into a cave painting of a horse. Images of other cave paintings appeared on the Globe, which began flickering, showing the invention of fire. The side fountains then displayed a singular red stream of water, symbolizing the humans discovering fire.

==== Adventure ====
The Earth Globe began showing images of native humans developing methods of transportation and images of vast landscapes. As countries and civilizations are formed, images of famous landmarks cover the Globe as the World Showcase pavilions are lit. Since the buildings of the Morocco Pavilion are replicas of buildings that have a great religious significance, the lights on the pavilion did not light up during this segment. In order to keep symmetry, the Norway Pavilion did not light up either. During this section, the side fountains and lasers alternated between various color combinations of blue/green, blue/orange, and blue/red. Four white clusters of fireworks were then launched and fizzled. As the pavilion lights faded, the fountains stopped, and the images on the sphere fizzled out. Blue and purple lights illuminated the inside of the Earth Globe allowing the structure behind the continents to be backlit.

Following this, strobe lights on the barge and pavilions flickered in sync with the music. Four sets of different colored high-launch fireworks were then launched from the center lagoon, one color at a time (magenta, green, orange, and yellow, respectively) as images of painters, dancers, sculptors, musicians, and architects were displayed on the Globe. Searchlights and lasers of the same four colors scanned the sky and lit the smoke from the fireworks. The side fountains matched the searchlight colors. Images of historical figures and folk heroes important to society were then displayed on the Globe closest to the countries which they originated. The final person shown on the globe was an astronaut who spun around further away from the foreground, spinning with the astronaut were colored fragments that eventually joined creating the seven continents.

==== Home ====
As the fragments joined and the music peaked, four very bright high-launch fireworks shells exploded in the sky while four other shells exploded soon after and fell immediately to the lagoon evoking the visual of a meteor shower. The side fountains lit up in blue and orange, while World Showcase pavilions were then all lit together for the first time. Blue and orange laser light filled the lagoon spreading from the American Adventure pavilion. Strobe lights flickered on the pavilions and from within the center of the Earth Globe. Fireworks were then launched from all around the perimeter of the lagoon.

==== Celebration ====
More fireworks were launched, as the side fountains changed colors from blue to orange. White beam fireworks were launched from around the Earth Globe, and smaller purple bursts were launched immediately afterwards. This effect continued throughout the entire segment. The lasers frequently changed colors while the World Showcase pavilions were lit with purple front light. This portion of the show concluded with another set of white perimeter fireworks and thousands of small purple fireworks filling the whole center of the lagoon. The Earth Globe fizzled to black while the pavilion lights remained lit.

=== Act III: Meaning (Hope for the Future) ===
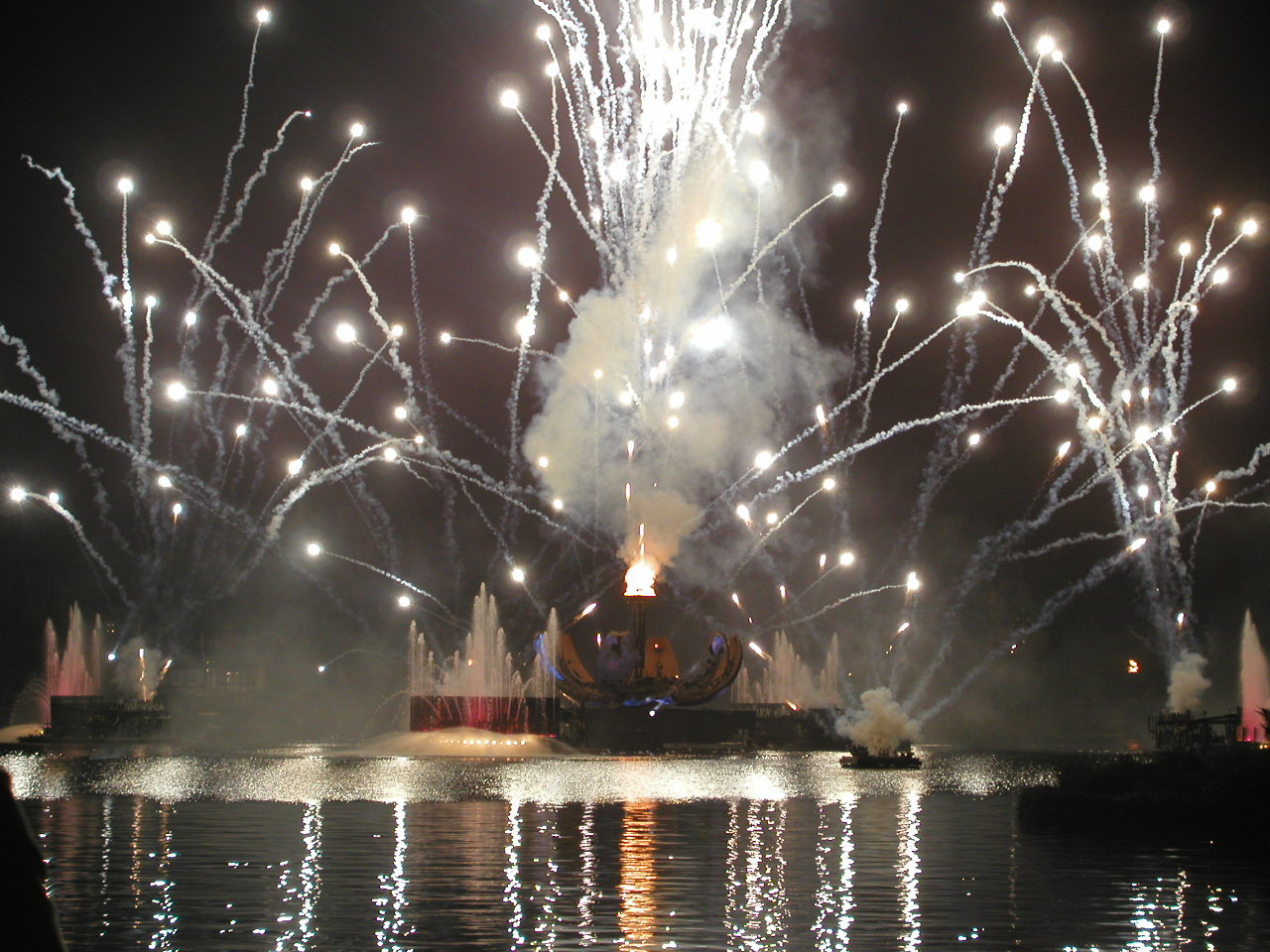
Finale of Act III, the globe is open to reveal the final unity torch.

As the song "We Go On" was played, the final act of the show began. Videos of passing a flame are shown on the Earth Globe. The torches around the lagoon are re-lit and the searchlights, aimed upwards at an angle, light up the sky above the lagoon, with the side fountains lit in a bright white. The Earth Globe then slowly began to open like a lotus blossom to reveal the final unity torch. Emanating fireworks are then launched, followed by 1,000 white fireworks brightly illuminating the lagoon. The show concluded with a final launch of perimeter fireworks and a set of bright white flashes, launched in sync with the music, ending with a loud crackle. The crackle made by the final set of fireworks could often be heard within several miles outside of the park.

=== Post Show ===
The show ended with a post-show announcement (spoken by Tom Kane):

Ladies and gentlemen, the entire Epcot family thanks you for having been with us for IllumiNations: Reflections of Earth. We hope that your visit to the Walt Disney World Resort has been a truly magical experience for you and yours. We wish you a pleasant evening and a safe journey home. Thank you and goodnight.

This was substituted by Cummings saying:

All of us at Epcot hope you have enjoyed Reflections of Earth.

The song "Promise" by Kellie Coffey then played as guests exited the park.

This song was then followed by the soundtrack to the Tapestry of Nations parade, another addition added to EPCOT as part of the Millennium Celebration. Once this song ended, the torches around the lagoon were extinguished.

== Technical infrastructure ==
=== Earth Globe ===
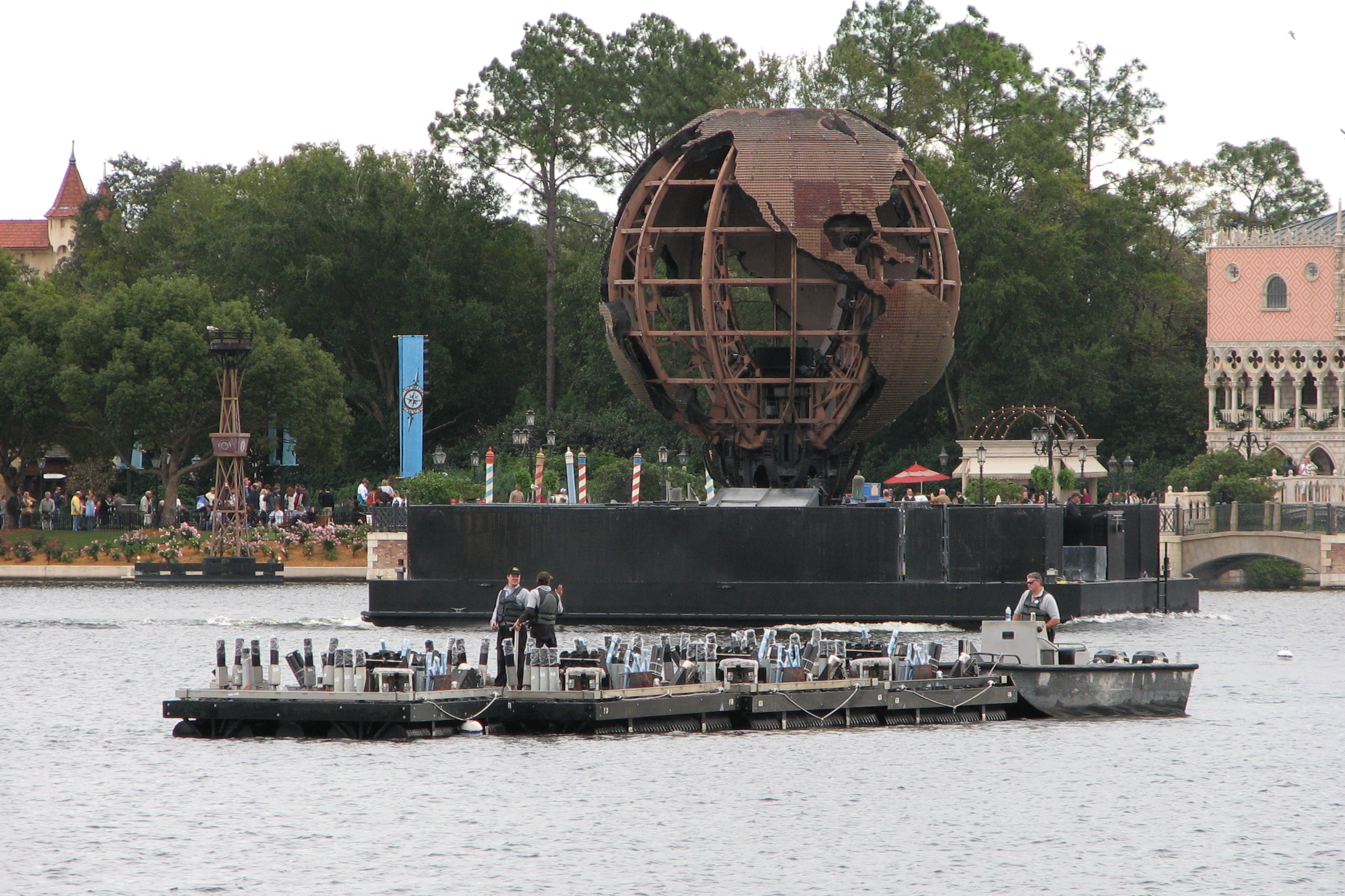
The Earth Globe is moved into position as a fireworks barge is prepared for the show.

The centerpiece of the show was the Earth Globe, a 28-foot (8.5 m) diameter globe housed on a 320 tonnes (350 short tons) barge. The world's first spherical video display system, the globe was wrapped in 15,600 LED clusters, each consisting of 12 light-emitting diodes. The Earth Globe started its journey from the edge of the World Showcase Lagoon, a 40-acre (160,000 m^{2}) man-made lake in Epcot, before anchoring itself in the middle of the lagoon. The Globe was 28 feet (8.5 m) in diameter and sits on top of a 10-foot pedestal. It contained 258 FlashWorks mini strobe lights (43 per petal) and was controlled by 6 computer processors. This was the only barge in the show with a driver on board, who uses an infrared guidance system. The Earth Globe was said to be one of the most complicated piece of show equipment made by Disney by History Channel's Modern Marvels.

Jerold Kaplan of Walt Disney Imagineering designed and engineered the Earth Globe and supporting barge. The detailed engineering for the barge and its propulsion and control systems were provided by Glowacki Engineering of Orange Park, FL. The Earth Globe Barge was built by Sun State Marine Services in Green Cove Springs, FL and was delivered in four major components which were assembled on site. The LED video display was run by a Pentium II server running Microsoft Windows 95/98 using a Serial ATA drive. There were two servers constantly running the same programs at the same time for fail-safe support. If one went down, they could instantly switch to the other server which presumably will still be running. The video control software, written by Derek Brown for Hitech Electronic Displays of Clearwater, Florida, communicates with onboard PLCs using two interfaces. The serial interface is used to receive the 4 character command codes separated by spaces to signify the end of each command. The NIDAQ (National Instrument Data Acquisition) card was used to provide status back to the PLCs. There are 8 optically isolated status channels. One channel was used to provide a heartbeat signal to tell the PLC that the software is on and functioning. The file formats were uncompressed AVIs passed through a masking filter to put the pixels in the spots for the countries.

During the first two minutes of the show, the Earth globe's LED screens were off. It was brown in color, but invisible in the thick black of the night. The Earth Globe's LED screens turned on in part two of the show, showing imagery of the natural world and iconic man-made structures. Slightly fewer than 300 pictures appeared on the Globe's spherical video screen during the show. Century III, an Orlando area film company, edited the video portion of the show. The pictures came from the stock libraries of Image Bank, National Geographic and Archive Films, some custom-shot live footage, and a single 3-D graphic animation shot. At the end of the show, the Earth Globe blossomed like a flower, revealing a flame torch that rose 40 feet above the lagoon. When the show ended, the fires on 19 of the torches keep burning, but the Earth Globe's torch is put out.

In the summer of 2008, the show ran a shortened, modified version in order for the Earth Globe to be refurbished. The refurbishment was to install a new LED video system, improving the clarity of the video. The content of the video was not changed.

=== Inferno Barge ===
The Inferno Barge in action

The Inferno Barge was a 150,000 pounds (68,000 kg) barge with an isopar system on board that sent balls of fire soaring 40 to 60 feet (12 to 18 m) into the air and on to the surface of the lagoon from 37 nozzles. 400 US gallons (1,500 L; 330 imp gal) of isopar were used every night for the show.

The Inferno Barge also housed an air-launch fireworks system. On September 19, 2005, the Inferno Barge was pulled from the show due to the explosion of a firework still inside its mortar tube earlier in the day. The structure took heavy damage; fortunately, no one was injured. The Inferno Barge returned to service on February 1, 2006, without the air launch system on the barge, although the cause of the accident was the firework shell itself and not the air launch system. The shells previously fired from this barge were moved and fired from the center slip. In February 2009, the inferno barge was pulled from the show and underwent a scheduled rehab. It returned on March 10, 2009. If any isopar is left in the tanks after the show, it is burned off later that night.

=== Fireworks ===
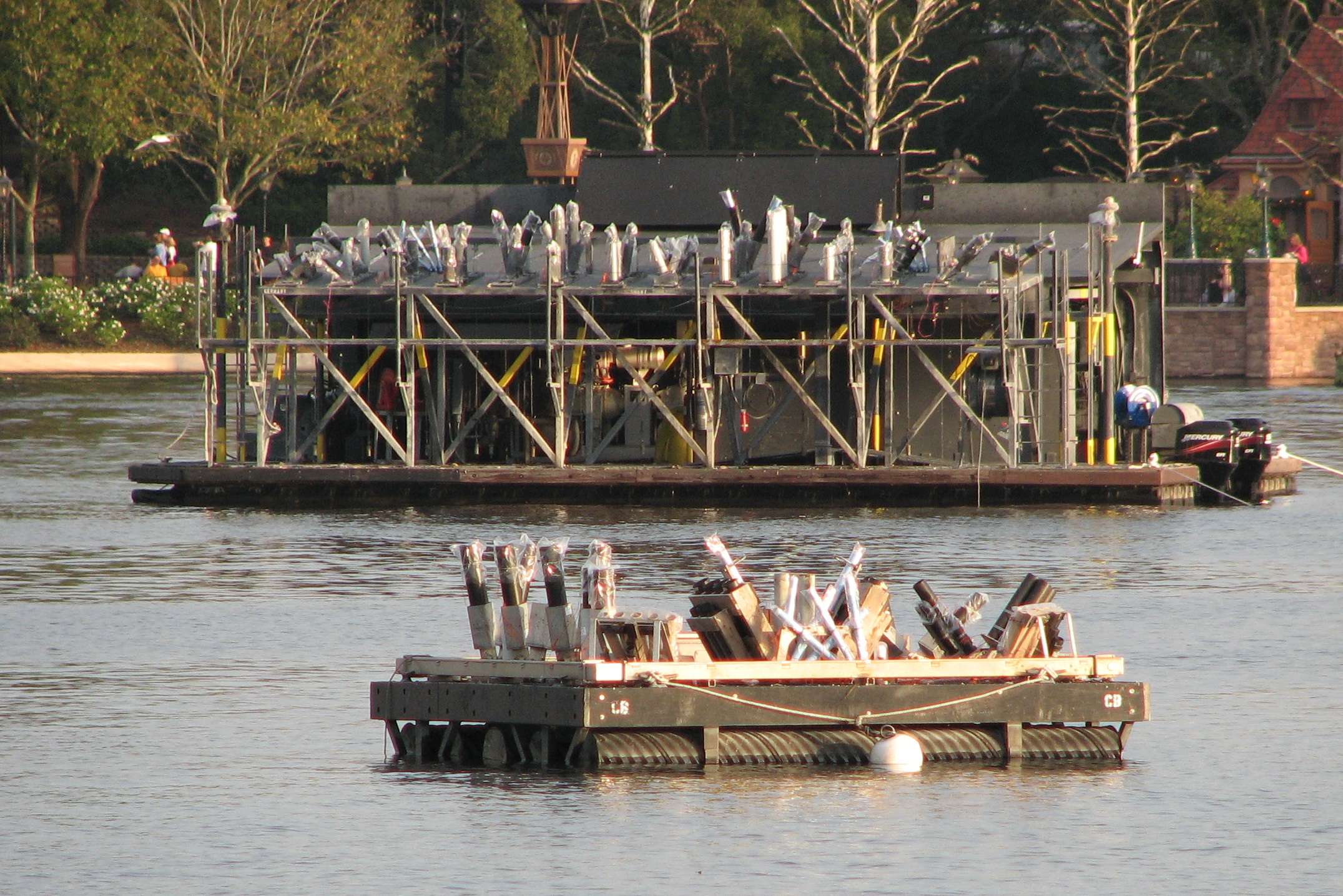
Fireworks barges (Air launch barge in background, conventional barge in the foreground)

Walt Disney Entertainment invented a new way of launching fireworks for the show, which used a pneumatic launch system, instead of black powder that pollutes more and causes the trail of an igniting firework shell to be seen. The technology was developed for Disneyland under requirement by the South Coast Air Quality Management District. The compressed air technology allowed for explosions to be timed with the music and for the height of the shell's explosion to be controlled. Not all the shells used the ALF (Air Launch Fireworks) technology. A timing chip was inserted into the shell and was programmed to ignite and explode with precision. Eric Tucker, an award-winning pyrotechnics designer, was brought on board to design new fireworks effects. Designers of the show meet with fireworks manufacturers in China to create these new effects for the show. 750 individual mortar tubes were used during each show, inside one of the 56 firing modules at 34 locations around the lagoon, producing 2,120 visible effects. During the holiday season, two more barges were added and an additional 455 pieces are fired, producing 818 more visible effects.

=== Lasers ===
Lasers are emitted from the buildings around the lake. This picture shows the high-power searchlights.

Full color laser systems were used, emanating from the American Adventure, Canada and Mexico pavilions. The projectors could launch laser light into the air as beams, as well as scan patterns and images. There were also bounce mirrors scattered around the park on various islands and rooftops, to further encapsulate the park in laser light. In November 2014, the show's laser programming underwent a major overhaul, and on December 8, 2014, it was announced that the lasers had been switched from ion lasers to solid-state lasers. This saves approximately 64 kilowatts of electric power per show. It also means that the laser would no longer need a water cooling system, which also reduced water consumption by thousands of gallons. The new lasers were also installed on the islands in World Showcase lagoon, and featured new patterns and colors. The FAA requires the user of any outdoor laser system to obtain advance permission and to contact local airports prior to use. Consequently, Orlando International Airport was notified by "Mexico Control" every night fifteen minutes before the show begins so that air traffic could be advised accordingly. Some pilots passing over the resort had used this call to announce to their passengers that they may get a glimpse of IllumiNations out of their window; however, it was rare.

=== Moving lights ===
A ring of eight programmable moving searchlights called Syncrolites were used. The fixtures have dousers to control brightness, and were equipped with a color scroller with 14 different colors, including the four colors selected specifically for the show: Lavender, Mint, Pumpkin, and Lagoon. In December 2011, a transition to new firework product began. The new product is more environmentally friendly, however they could not create the original four colors of the show. Instead, standard colors (Orange, Green, Magenta, and Yellow) replaced Lavender, Mint, Pumpkin, and Lagoon Blue. The color scrollers were fitted with new colors to match the product change. These lights could be programmed to highlight pavilions, illuminate the smoke from fireworks above the lagoon, or just make interesting patterns in the sky as they crossed each other and move.

=== Fountain barges ===
There were four side fountain barges that had 40 water nozzles per barge. There was an effect that created a "skirt" of water around the bottom. A lighting system on-board allowed the water to be displayed in different colors. Each barge pumped approximately 4,000 US gallons (15,000 L; 3,300 imp gal) of water per minute. These barges carried pyrotechnics as well.

=== Torches ===
19 Torches surrounded World Showcase Lagoon, each representing a century completed of the last two millennia. The 20th torch, representing the 20th century and called the Unity Torch, was revealed when the Globe opens in the third act of IllumiNations: Reflections of Earth. The Unity Torch represented the world coming together to celebrate the gift of life and the Earth as a whole. The torches also symbolized the significance of fire to humanity as an element that unites cultures over time, as well as its significance to the Earth, as was alluded to in the show's prologue.

After the closure of IllumiNations: Reflections of Earth in 2019, all 19 torches remained in place on the shores of the lagoon. All of its successors (Epcot Forever, Harmonious, and Luminous the Symphony of Us) used the remaining torches. Notably, the torches were lit during the "Celebration" section of Epcot Forever, where selected music from the Walt Disney World Millennium Celebration is played.

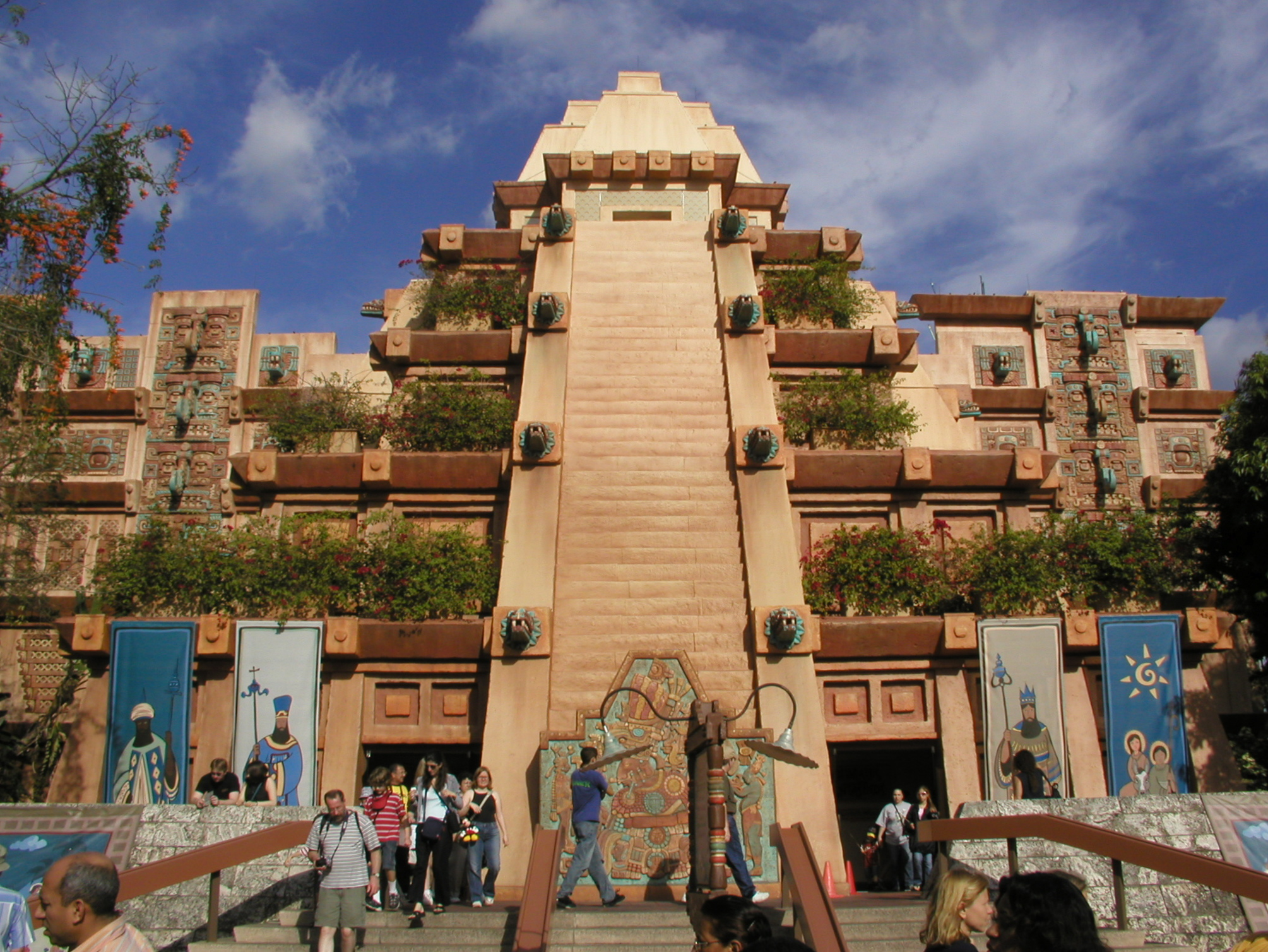
The control booth is at the top of the stairs on the façade, where the opening is.

=== Control booth ===
The control booth was located above the Mexico Pavilion. It housed emergency stop controls, communications to each barge using wireless Ethernet, and headset communication to the Globe barge driver. All barges were wired with multi-core cables, and most functions within these cables had a redundant wireless backup. Show audio and announcements also originated from the booth.

The show used more than 65 computers in 40 separate locations, hundreds of lighting fixtures, four fountain barges, the inferno barge, the Earth Globe barge, multiple fireworks barges, and lasers.

== Special editions ==
=== Holiday finale ===
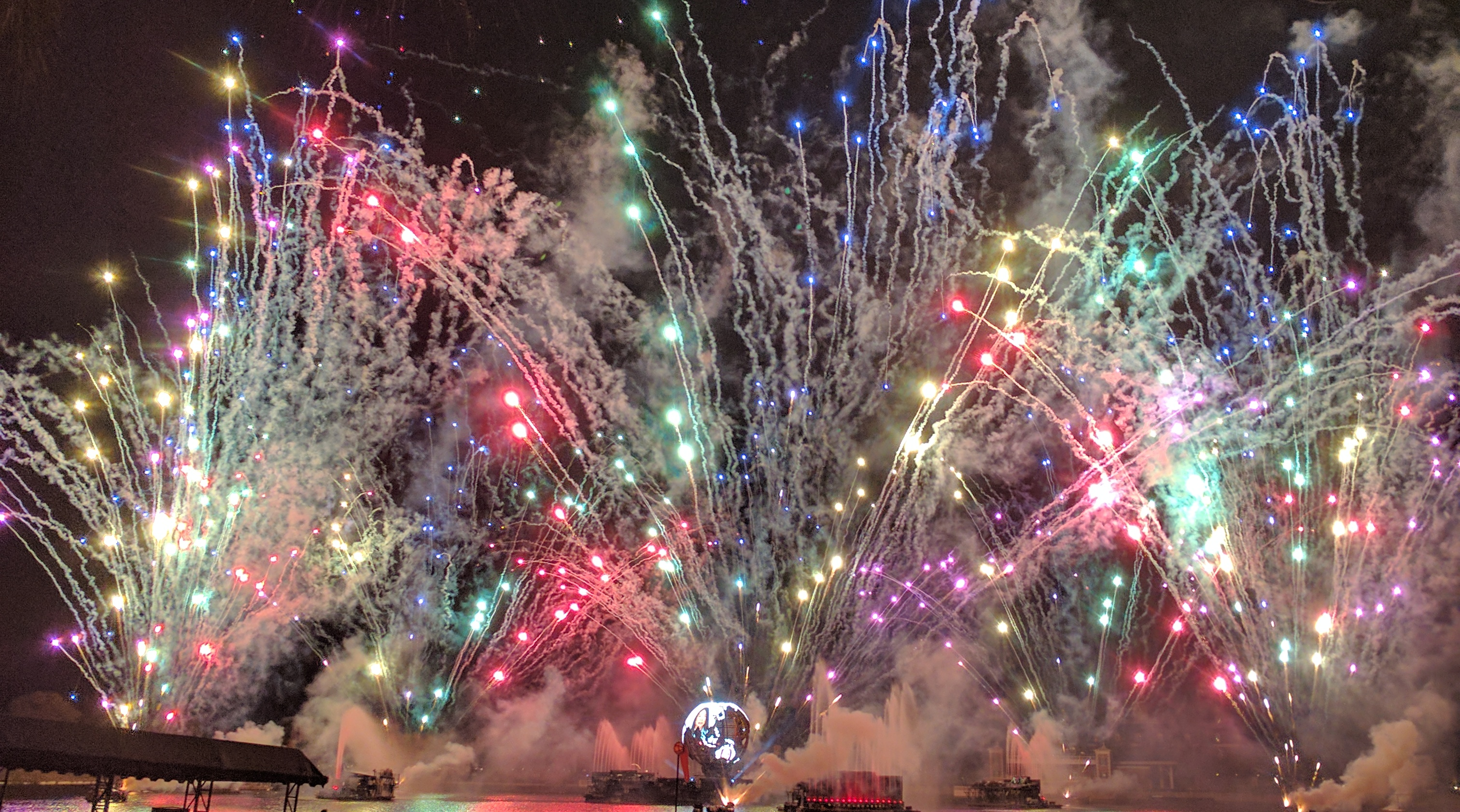
The Holiday Tag, seen in 2016

During the holiday season, after the regular finale there was a special Holiday finale tag originally from Holiday IllumiNations following the regular production. Immediately after the regular finale, a female announcer announced; "And now, at this special time, as we embrace the promise of a New Year, we'd like to share one final message." The song "Let There Be Peace On Earth" was played as the Earth Barge returned to its original closed state. Once closed, the barge's display showed the message “Peace on Earth, Good Will to Men" in multiple languages. When a language corresponding to a specific pavilion was spoken, that pavilion lit up. Once the final pavilion, The American Adventure, lit up, a female announcer said,

During this glorious time of year there is one message that rings out around the world in every language. Peace on earth. Good will to men is a wish to hold in our hearts throughout each passing year. A gift of immeasurable value. A treasure being handed down with care, from generation to generation. And so our holiday wish is that everyone, everywhere share in the spirit of the season. Peace on earth, good will to men.

The song continued with an uninterrupted firework display, ending with a loud explosion of fireworks. This tag launched just as many pyrotechnic devices as IllumiNations: Reflections of Earth did.

=== Fourth of July ===
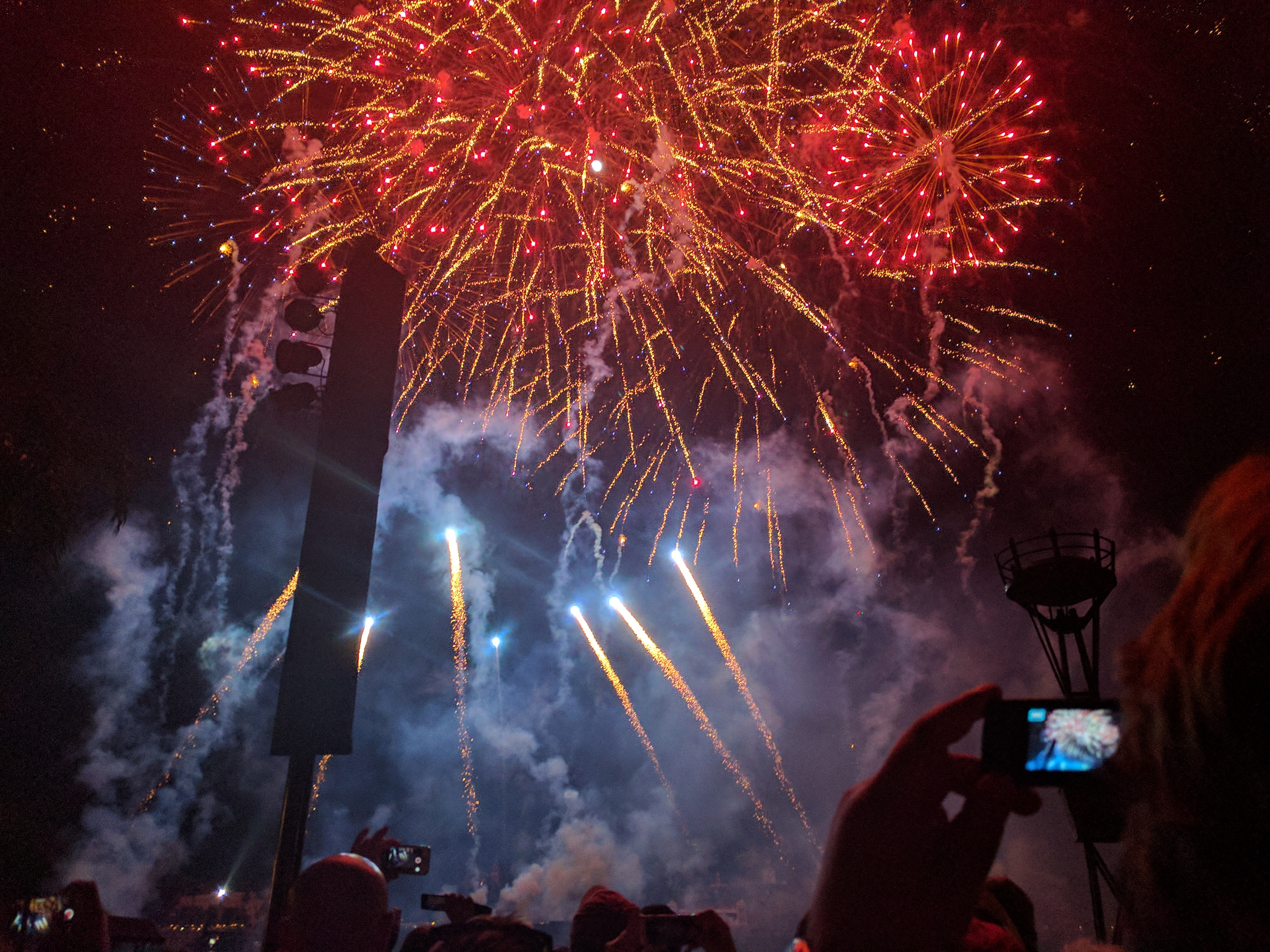
Fourth of July tag, seen in 2017

The show was shown around 10:00 PM and after the show, the song "Yankee Doodle" played and fireworks shoot up from the roof and back of the American Adventure Pavilion, beginning The Heartbeat of Freedom tag. More fireworks in the lagoon were synchronized as if fireworks were marching along with the drumbeat. Then "Stars and Stripes Forever" played. The Earth Barge displayed images of American independence during a flute solo. Then a barrage of fireworks were launched during the finale, which created a smokescreen. As the music ended, the smoke had been cleared out. The style was altered in 2006 as selected songs were played for the 230th year of US independence. At the end, the song "The Battle Hymn of the Republic" was heard, and the American pavilion lit up as fireworks shot up from the behind the American pavilion. Just before the end of the tag, hundreds of fireworks shot up in the lagoon as the show ended. At the tag's conclusion, "God Bless the USA" was played, the American pavilion was outlined, and the Earth Barge displayed the US flag. The laser projection in the US pavilion (projecting to Spaceship Earth) displayed "Happy Birthday America: Celebrating (number) Years of Freedom". More than 2000 shells were launched from 32 barges for this tag. The tag returned on July 4, 2022, after the regular performance of Harmonious. The tag returned on July 4, 2023, after the regular performance of Epcot Forever. The tag returned on July 4, 2024, after the regular performance of Luminous: The Symphony of Us.

=== New Year's Eve Countdown Edition ===
Every December 31, a special New Year's Eve countdown show occurred normally beginning at 11:40 PM. The show began with the original show production and was then immediately followed by a special countdown show. Highlights of New Years celebrated in individual countries began the show; the Asian pavilions (Japan and China) went first, followed by those in Europe (Italy, Norway, France, Germany) and then after that, the countries of those in the GMT time zone (Morocco and the United Kingdom). During the presentation, fireworks shot from the back of each pavilion accompanied by custom celebration music from each country. The countdown began at 10 seconds prior to midnight with Canada, Mexico, and the United States. The countdown started with a dong (which originated from the American pavilion) and led to the massive celebratory firework display at 12:00 midnight which included a 360-degree launch of fireworks around the World Showcase lagoon. The song "Auld Lang Syne" played as spectators cheered and watched the massive firework display. This tag used double the number of fireworks that were launched in IllumiNations: Reflections of Earth. A male announcer concluded the show wishing guests a Happy New Year and reminded guests of extended park hours for the New Year's Eve celebration. This segment continued to be used after Epcot Forever and in New Year's Eve 2021, 2022, 2023, and 2024, which was used as a standalone show titled Cheers to the New Year: A Sparkling Celebration, using show materials from Harmonious and Luminous: The Symphony of Us.

=== Epcot's 25th Anniversary Special Edition ===
On October 1, 2007, a four-minute-long, one-day-only tag commemorating Epcot's 25th Silver Anniversary followed IllumiNations: Reflections of Earth. The tag used the "World War III Barges" and was said have to tripled the amount of fireworks launched. At the end of the regular show a male voice-over was heard saying, "And now in honor of Epcot's 25th Anniversary we celebrate our history and look to the future. We've just begun to dream." Once the music began, select segments of classic Epcot music were played including We've Just Begun to Dream, Tapestry of Nations, and Surprise in the Skies. After the show, the retro music loop played throughout the park that day began to play, beginning with New Horizons. Due to the extra amount of fireworks used for the special tag, it took much longer than normal to move the firework barges off of the lagoon which resulted in a burn off after midnight.

=== Epcot's 30th Anniversary Special Edition ===
On October 1, 2012, a four-minute long, one-day only tag commemorating Epcot's 30th Anniversary followed immediately after the standard IllumiNations show. The show was followed by a playback of music from Epcot's early days. accompanied by laser generated wording on Spaceship Earth noting the celebratory occasion. Ten extra barges were used during this show.

=== Epcot's 35th Anniversary Special Edition ===
Similar to the 25th and 30th anniversaries, IllumiNations had a one-day-only tag commemorating Epcot's 35th anniversary after the normal IllumiNations show on October 1, 2017. The show included the same music as the 25th and 30th anniversary tags, as well as fireworks from the extra barges.

== Soundtrack ==
The score for IllumiNations: Reflections of Earth was composed by Gavin Greenaway. Hans Zimmer, composer of The Lion King, asked Greenaway to take on the project because he was busy with other projects. Zimmer collaborated with Greenaway in the beginning of the process. The show's main score is entitled "Reflections of Earth", and was recorded with a 71-piece philharmonic orchestra and a 30-voice chorus.

=== Production ===
"Reflections of Earth" (Working title: "Earth 2000")

- Composer, producer, and conductor: Gavin Greenaway
- Show and music director: Don Dorsey
- Executive music producer: Steve Skorija
- Mixing engineer/recording producer: Alan Meyerson
- Music supervisor: Dan Savant
- Music preparation: Express Music Services
- Music editor: Michael Atwell
- Music contractor: Isobel Griffiths Ltd
- Music contractor/composer: Nick Paul
- Music coordination: Savant Productions
- Recorded at Abbey Road Studios by members of the London Philharmonic Orchestra, possibly including some players from the London Symphony Orchestra and the Royal Philharmonic Orchestra
- Mixed at Media Ventures, Los Angeles, California

"We Go On" and "Promise"

- Vocals: Kellie Coffey
- Composer: Gavin Greenaway
- Lyrics: Don Dorsey
- All other credits refer to Reflections of Earth above.

=== Releases ===
The complete show soundtrack can be found on these releases:

- Walt Disney World Millennium Celebration (1999)
  - There was also a shortened version of the show soundtrack on a promotional CD included with Energizer batteries purchased in 2000.
- Re-released in 2001 as IllumiNations: Reflections of Earth / Tapestry of Dreams (2001), containing one less track than the 1999 release.

=== Other uses ===
The music for IllumiNations: Reflections of Earth has been used across a variety of sources. In 2000, the score was used for ABC 2000 Today, ABC Television's 25-hour-long program that followed the beginning of the millennium around the globe on December 31, 1999, and January 1, 2000. The broadcast also included video of IllumiNations: Reflections of Earth. The score was also used during Hong Kong's Chinese New Year celebrations. ABC used a modified version for their New Year's program ABC 2002 on December 31, 2001, and January 1, 2002. ABC News used a version of the theme for their televised coverage throughout the 2000 and 2004 presidential elections. Most of the score (excluding the Chaos section and the start of We Go On) was used in a laser light show at the 2005 National Scout Jamboree at Fort A.P. Hill. The Chaos section was used in the fireworks celebration of the 250th anniversary of Pittsburgh, Pennsylvania on October 4, 2008. ABC also used the music during coverage of the Presidential Inauguration of Barack Obama on January 20, 2009. Parts of the score are also used in the video "Welcome: Portraits of America", displayed in the Customs and Border Protection checkpoints in most US airports. Domino Day 2009 used the ending part of We Go On when the final builders challenge, "Fire", was successful. The Drum & Bugle Corps The Cadets used this material for the 2000 show entitled: We Are The Future. The music from the "Sacred Grove" segment from the Vancouver 2010 Olympic Winter Games opening ceremony, composed and produced by David Atkins was based on the Life section from Reflections of Earth.

=== Pre-show music ===
The show was preceded by thirty minutes of pre-show music, which was largely based in modern European folk music. The first loop was introduced on the show's first performance on October 22, 1999, and would be used until July 3, 2004. Due to popular demand, this loop was reinstated in 2012.

==== 1999 pre-show loop ====
1. "They Were Dancing Barefoot" – Yehuda Poliker
2. "Superwasp/Along the Coast of Norway/Neckbuster" – Seelyhoo
3. "Native Funk" – Burning Sky
4. "Flute Battle" – Cusco
5. "The Concertina Set" – Bùrach
6. "Imeland" – Groupa
7. "Montezuma" – Cusco
8. "30-Års Jiggen (Thirty-Year Jig)" – Väsen
9. "Inca Dance" – Cusco
10. "Appalachian Morning" – John Williams & Boston Pops Orchestra

On July 4, 2004, a new pre-show loop was introduced, this one featuring largely new-age world music. This new loop would be used until 2012, when it was replaced with the original 1999 loop. Beginning in 2015, both the 2004 and 1999 loops were used, with one being chosen randomly each night.

==== 2004 pre-show loop ====
1. "Jalan Kopo" – Sabah Habas Mustapha
2. "Falling Through a Cloud" – Uttara-Kuru
3. "Busindre Reel" – Hevia
4. "Gaviotes" – Hevia
5. "Tula" – Cusco
6. "Our Life" – Uttara-Kuru

Three additional songs ("Bierdna" by Hedningarna, "Red Skies" by Omar Faruk Tekbilek, and "Texas" by Wimme, respectively) were used to extend the 2004 loop when the show was delayed for technical issues or inclement weather.
