= Luminous The Symphony of Us =

Epcot nighttime show, 2023

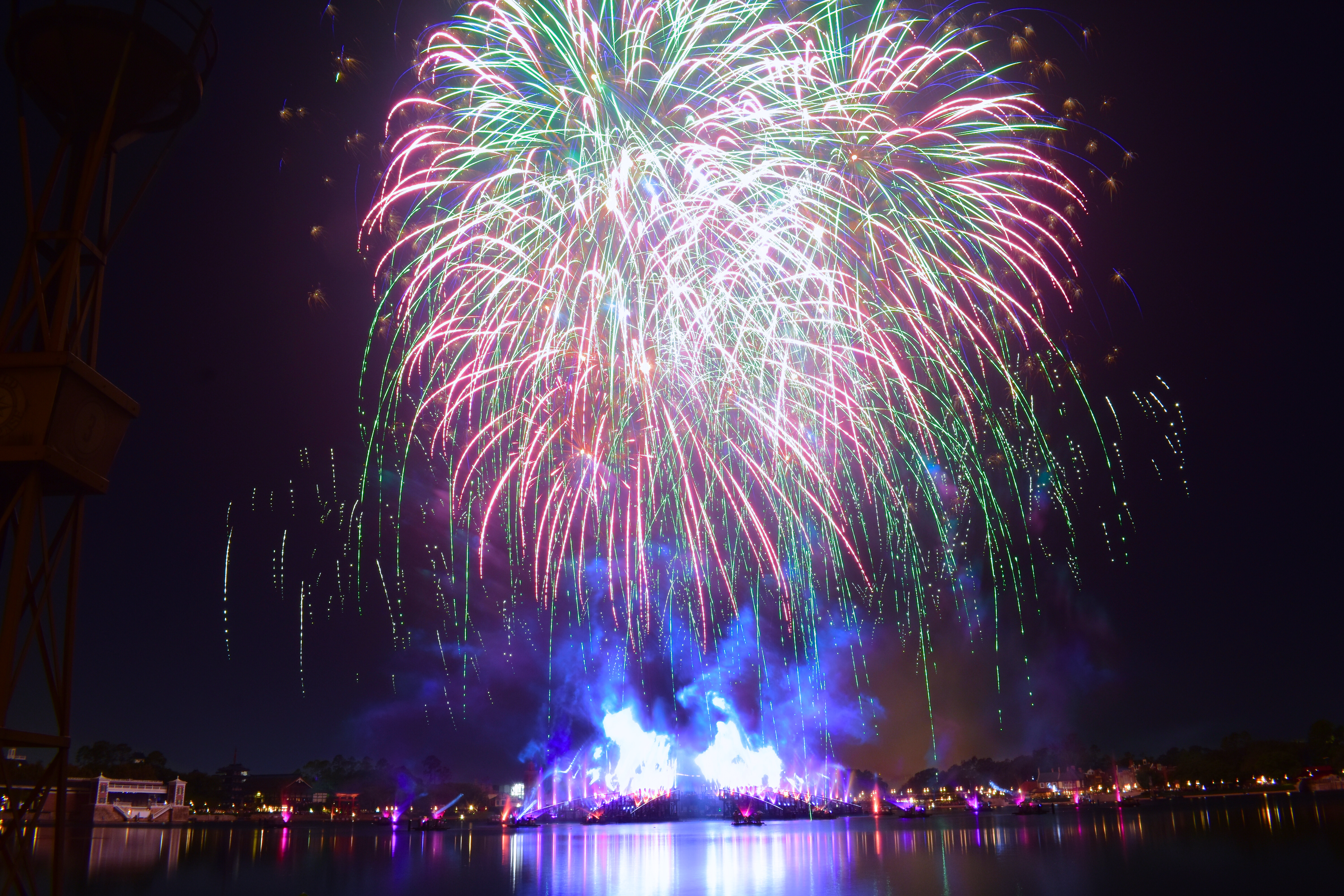

Epcot
- Area: World Showcase (World Showcase Lagoon)
- Status: Operating
- Opening date: December 5, 2023
- Replaced: IllumiNations: Reflections of Earth (2019) Harmonious (2023) Epcot Forever (2023)

Ride statistics
- Attraction type: Fireworks, laser, water, and light show
- Designer: Disney Live Entertainment
- Theme: Global unity and human connection
- Music: Pinar Toprak (original music); Various Artists (Songs)
- Duration: 17 minutes
- Wheelchair accessible

Luminous The Symphony of Us is a fireworks-based nighttime spectacular at EPCOT at Walt Disney World Resort in Bay Lake, Florida. A successor to both IllumiNations: Reflections of Earth and Harmonious, Luminous showcases and celebrates the passage of life, cultures, and customs shared across global communities. The show features synchronized pyrotechnics, choreographed water fountains, lasers, searchlights, and fire torches to present a 360° audio-visual experience on the park's World Showcase Lagoon.

Luminous The Symphony of Us debuted on December 5, 2023, to commemorate Walt Disney's 122nd birthday and as part of the centennial anniversary of The Walt Disney Company. The show was developed by Disney Live Entertainment under the direction of its vice president of parades and spectaculars, Steve Davison.

== Show summary ==
Luminous features a selection of new arrangements of Disney songs, two new original songs, and original music by Pinar Toprak, including Toprak's "EPCOT Anthem" interpolated throughout the show. The music for the show was recorded across multiple locations including by the Royal Scottish National Orchestra in Glasgow and the London Voices in London, as well as in New York, Nashville, and Orlando.

=== Overture: The Great Gathering ===
Music: "Heartbeat Symphony" (written by A.J. Sealy, Scott Hoying, and Sheléa Frazier), "EPCOT Anthem"

Narration: "Welcome, to the great gathering."

Each country's pavilion in the World Showcase then individually welcomes everyone in their native language, with a firework rocket launching from the perimeter of the World Showcase Lagoon nearest to that pavilion. After each country, two final welcomes. The first of the final welcomes is a recording of Walt Disney saying "Welcome" during the dedication of Disneyland. This welcome comes with a firework rocket launch from all of the perimeter launch points. The second final welcome is each country's welcome once more, this time in unison.

Narration: "Everyone on this Earth is part of the great Symphony of Us. Each of us a unique instrument playing harmony to one another. And even though we are all playing different parts, it's our unified heartbeat that connects us, reminding us that we are more alike than we are different. A rhapsody of rhythms that unites us and connects us through commonalities of the heart. Come, find your place in the great Symphony of Us."

The original song, "Heartbeat Symphony" begins playing.

Lyrics: "Can you hear the sound of a world in motion? The wind through the trees, the tides of the ocean? Can you feel the beat of a million hearts, all in time, Like the sun and the moon aligned? And in those tiny moments in between, I remember.

You are a part of me, and I am a part of you. Just like a symphony, different melodies live in harmony. So go ahead and sing your song, I'll be there to sing along. When we come together, it's a heartbeat symphony. It's a heartbeat symphony.

Oh, you are a part of me, and I am a part of you. Just like a symphony, different melodies live in harmony. So go ahead and sing your song, I'll be there to sing along. And all of the world, will become a symphony, will become a symphony."

=== Movement 1: Birth ===
Music: "You'll Be in My Heart"

Narration: "When we are born, we come into this world to raw noise. Cradled in tenderness, we tune ourselves to the world around us."

The song, "You'll Be in My Heart" begins playing, in English, Mandarin and French intertwined.

=== Movement 2: Family ===
Music: "Proud Corazón"

Narration: "We begin to understand what our instrument can do. We find our voice and add it to the ensemble of our ancestors, our family, nuestra familia."

=== Movement 3: Play ===
Music: "You've Got a Friend in Me", "Friend Like Me"

Narration: "We begin to recognize the music in others, trading notes and improvising. Music becomes play."

=== Movement 4: Love ===
Music: "Can You Feel the Love Tonight", "So Close"

Narration: "Sometimes we find another, and our melodies blend, and suddenly, with the hum of our heartstrings, our world becomes a duet."

=== Movement 5: Loss ===
Music: "When She Loved Me", "Remember Me"

Narration: "Inevitably in life, the accompaniment drops out, and we experience great loss. We find that the melodies we cherish are gone, and for a moment, we are playing alone."

=== Movement 6: Unity ===
Music: "Into the Unknown", "I See the Light"

Narration: "But we are never truly alone. Sing out so others can hear you. The music we make echos back at us, in chorus, in concert, in symphony! Together our voices can illuminate the world, if we only listen closely for the sounds of each other."

=== Finale: Beating of our Hearts ===
Music: "Beating of Our Hearts" (written by The Heavyweights), "EPCOT Anthem"

Narration: "How miraculous that we exist on this planet at the same time, and yet it's the human connection that unifies us."

The Points of Light on Spaceship Earth form a globe and the barges in the center of the lagoon launch pyrotechnics in the shapes of hearts.

Lyrics: "A pulse, a beat, like gravity, the rhythm of our hearts, it's all around. A bond, a pledge, a common thread, connects us in a unifying sound. Like the pounding of a drum, steady, spinning 'round the sun, the beating of our hearts, echos straight up to the stars, for all the world to hear it never fades. Steady, are you ready? Can you feel it? Here it comes.

Oh, come together as one, like a wave across the ocean, like a river of love when your heart is wide open. Sound, it's in all that we are. Feel it in the beat, feel it in the beat of our hearts. It's the beating of our hearts. One single moment in time, resounding all together every beat aligns. So look around, and hear it loud, the echo of our hearts.

Oh, come together as one (come together as one), like a wave across the ocean (oh!), like a river of love when your heart is wide open. Sound, it's in all that we are. Feel it in the beat, feel it in the beat of our hearts. It's the beating of our hearts. It's the beating of our hearts. It's the beating of our hearts."

Narration: "In the great, Symphony of Us."

Lyrics: "We'll become a symphony!"

== Special Editions ==
=== New Year's Eve Countdown Edition ===
Since December 31, 2023, this segment, which was a tag after IllumiNations: Reflections of Earth, was used again, as a standalone show in New Year's Eve 2023, 2024 and 2025 titled Cheers to the New Year: A Sparkling Celebration, which was also used in the New Year's Eve celebrations of 2021 and 2022.

=== Fourth of July ===
On June 18, 2024, it was announced that the Independence Day tag, titled The Heartbeat of Freedom, which was used from 2006 to 2019 for IllumiNations: Reflections of Earth, 2022 for Harmonious, and 2023 for EPCOT Forever was once again used after the show's regular performance. It was performed on July 4, 2024. The 2024 version had some differences from its previous versions, because the finale pyro part of the show took place entirely behind The American Adventure, particularly at the tail end of the fireworks finale, as opposed to previous iterations of the show where it took place at World Showcase Lagoon.

On June 27, 2025, it was announced that the Independence Day tag titled as The Heartbeat of Freedom would return on July 4, 2025. This version of the tag also included additional fireworks, fountains, and patriotic lighting on Spaceship Earth.

On May 19, 2026, it was announced that the independence day tag titled as The Heartbeat of Freedom would return on July 3–5, 2026, as part of Disney's celebration of the United States Semiquincentennial.

== Music ==
=== Soundtrack ===
The soundtrack for Luminous: The Symphony of Us (Music from the EPCOT Nighttime Spectacular) was released by Walt Disney Records on streaming platforms and online music stores on April 29, 2024, to coincide with the National Geographic documentary EPCOT Becoming: Inside the Transformation airing on the same night on NatGeoTV (and on Disney+ and Hulu beginning July 19, 2024).

=== Track listing ===
Welcome – Pinar Toprak (1:53)

Heartbeat Symphony – Sheléa (2:22)

Parental Love – Stef Fink, Katherine Ho & Rebecca Grae (1:30)

Luminous Family – Pinar Toprak (0:34)

Family – STEVE CARRILLO, Aaron Pier & LOUIE RANJEL (1:02)

Friendship – Luminous: The Symphony of Us – Cast (1:06)

Luminous Romance – Katharine McPhee (0:38)

Romance – Marsh Hall (1:23)

Loss – Cayson Renshaw & Ashley Rosa (1:40)

Into the Light – Katharine McPhee (2:10)

Beating of Our Hearts – Sheléa & Katharine McPhee (2:53)

Beating of Our Hearts (Acoustic Version) – David DQ Quinones (3:15)

One Heartbeat – Michelle Zarlenga (3:26)
