= IllumiNations =

Former fireworks show at Epcot

IllumiNations was a series of nightly fireworks shows at Epcot before IllumiNations: Reflections of Earth was created in 1999 for the Walt Disney World Millennium Celebration.

== Le Carnaval de Lumière ==
Le Carnaval de Lumière

Epcot
- Area: World Showcase (World Showcase Lagoon)
- Status: Closed
- Opening date: October 23, 1982
- Closing date: June 1983
- Replaced by: A New World Fantasy

Ride statistics
- Designer: WED Enterprises
- Music: "The Festival of Festivals" by Don Dorsey

The first evening presentation, Le Carnaval de Lumière (lit.‍, 'Light Carnival'), premiered on October 23, 1982. It celebrated world festivals with fountains, film, music, and other effects. The show used rear projection screens on barges floating on the World Showcase Lagoon. Between the projection barges were fountain/fireworks barges controlled by Apple computers. The show could be viewed only from points between the Mexican and Canadian pavilions.

== A New World Fantasy ==
A New World Fantasy

Epcot
- Area: World Showcase (World Showcase Lagoon)
- Status: Closed
- Opening date: June 1983
- Closing date: 1984
- Replaced: Le Carnaval de Lumière
- Replaced by: Laserphonic Fantasy

Ride statistics
- Designer: WED Enterprises
- Music: "The Festival of Festivals" by Don Dorsey

A New World Fantasy was the 2nd version of a fireworks show at Epcot and was set to classical music played on synthesizer. It opened in June 1983 and used floating barges that had rear projection screens on them. The barges were the same as the first show at Epcot, Carnival de Lumiere. The show also added 'Pichel lights' that moved automatically.

Most of the soundtrack can be found on Don Dorsey's album "Busted", but the "Great Parades and Pageants" segment was removed. The complete soundtrack can be found on a promotional Don Dorsey album.

=== Show program ===
==== Fanfare ====
1. "Fanfare" from La Péri

Paul Dukas

==== Act I: Celebrations on Land ====
2. Symphony No. 5, First Movement

Ludwig van Beethoven

3. "Flight Of The Bumblebee" from The Tale of the Tsar Sultan

Nikolai Rimsky-Korsakov

4. Zampa Overture

Louis Joseph Ferdinand Herold

5. Piano Concerto No. 1, Third Movement

Ludwig van Beethoven

6. La Vie Parisienne

Jacques Offenbach

7. "Dance Of The Comedians" from The Bartered Bride

Bedřich Smetana

8. "Bourrée" from the Water Music Suite

George Frideric Handel

9. Brandenburg Concerto No. 5, First Movement

Johann Sebastian Bach

10. Orpheus In Hades, Galop

Jacques Offenbach

11. Trisch-Trasch Polka

Johann Strauss II

12. Italian Concerto, Third Movement

Johann Sebastian Bach

13. William Tell Overture

Gioacchino Rossini

==== Act II: Great Parades and Pageants ====
14. "Procession of The Nobles" from Mlada

Nikolai Rimsky-Korsakov

15. "March" from Love For Three Oranges

Sergei Prokofiev

16. "Farandole" from L'Arlesienne Suite No. 2

Georges Bizet

17. March Militaire

Franz Schubert

18. "March of The Toreadors" from Carmen

Georges Bizet

19. The Marriage of Figaro, Aria

Wolfgang Amadeus Mozart

20. Light Cavalry Overture

Franz von Suppé

21. Radetsky March

Johann Strauss I

22. "Procession of The Nobles" from Mlada

Nikolai Rimsky-Korsakov

23. March Hongroise

Hector Berlioz

24. "Anvil Chorus" from Il Trovatore

Giuseppe Verdi

25. Hands Across the Sea

John Philip Sousa

==== Act III: Revelries in Pyrotechnics ====
26. Carnival Overture

Antonín Dvořák

27. "Overture" from Carmen

Georges Bizet

28. "Alla Hornpipe" from the Water Music Suite

George Frideric Handel

29. Symphony No. 1 in D, "Titan"; First Movement

Gustav Mahler

30. Symphony No. 9, "Choral"; Fourth Movement

Ludwig van Beethoven

31. "Lohengrin"; Prelude to Act 3

Richard Wagner

32. Firebird Suite, Finale

Igor Stravinsky

33. "Great Gate of Kiev" from Pictures at an Exhibition

Modest Mussorgsky

34. "Promenade (Reprise)" from Pictures at an Exhibition

Modest Mussorgsky

35. "1812 Festival Overture"

Pyotr Ilyich Tchaikovsky

== Laserphonic Fantasy ==
Laserphonic Fantasy

Epcot
- Area: World Showcase (World Showcase Lagoon)
- Status: Closed
- Opening date: June 9, 1984
- Closing date: January 24, 1988
- Replaced: A New World Fantasy
- Replaced by: IllumiNations

Ride statistics
- Music: "The Festival of Festivals" by Don Dorsey

This show has the same soundtrack as A New World Fantasy. It featured lasers emitted from barges and from around the lagoon. The "Skater" segment featured the first use of non-continuous lines in a laser animation and was the first use of laser graphics on a water-droplet screen.

- Most of the soundtrack can be found on Don Dorsey's album "Busted", but the "Great Parades and Pageants" segment was removed.
- The complete soundtrack can be found on a promotional Don Dorsey album.

== IllumiNations ==
IllumiNations

Epcot
- Area: World Showcase (World Showcase Lagoon)
- Status: Closed
- Opening date: January 30, 1988
- Closing date: September 20, 1996
- Replaced: Laserphonic Fantasy
- Replaced by: IllumiNations 25 (A)

Ride statistics
- Music: "The Festival of Festivals" by Don Dorsey
- Duration: 14:00
- Sponsor: General Electric

This show used most of the arrangements for "A New World Fantasy" and "Laserphonic Fantasy," but instead of being arranged solely with synthesizers, the resulting arrangements were rescored for full orchestra, mostly using the original orchestration by the composers. New music was created for the show's theme by Don Dorsey and Bruce Healey. The "Great Parades and Pageants" section used in the previous installments was omitted and replaced with a celebration of all the individual countries of World Showcase (except Norway, which had just opened by the show's premiere). This installment of IllumiNations began a radical new use for effects in fireworks shows. To add to the Pichel lights, fountains, laser barges, and laser graphics projected behind the fountains, the directors made the lights representing the different interact with the music and the rest of the show. In another strange turn of events, they decided not to use fireworks until the very end of the second act, and then the third act would show the fireworks off at their best.

=== Show program ===
==== Opening ====
Good evening, and welcome to World Showcase. Tonight we are pleased to present a visual journey, an international fantasy of music and light. We're about to embark on a sparkling abstract expedition around World Showcase. With the music as your passport, we'll discover sights and sounds from colorful ports of call. And to celebrate our journey, the countries will be united by the festive elements of water, fire, and light. And now, let your imagination be your guide, as EPCOT Center proudly presents IllumiNations.

— Introduction

==== Act I ====
1. Symphony #5 Movement #1

- Composer: Ludwig van Beethoven

2. "Flight of the Bumblebee" from Tale Of The Tsar Sultan

- Composer: Nikolai Rimsky-Korsakov

3. Zampa Overture first theme

- Composer: Louis Joseph Ferdinand Herold

4. Italian Concerto Movement # 3, first theme

- Composer: Johann Sebastian Bach

5. William Tell Overture second theme

- Composer: Giachhino Rossini

==== Act II: World Showcase ====
6. Scheherezade (Morocco)

- Composer: Nicholas Rimsky-Korsakov

7. Orphée aux Enfers, Galop Infernal (France)

- Composer: Jacques Offenbach

8. Days of Emancipation (China)

- Composer: Zhu Jian'er

9. Rule Britannia (United Kingdom)

- Composer: Thomas Augustine Arne

10. Tales of the Vienna Woods (Germany)

- Composer: Johann Strauss

11. Sakura (Japan)

- Composer: Unknown

12. España Cani (Mexico)

- Composer: Marquina

13. French Canadian Jig Traditional (Canada)

- Composer: Unknown

14. Funiculì, Funiculà (Italy)

- Composer: Luigi Denza

15. Rhapsody in Blue (United States)

- Composer: George Gershwin

==== Act III: Finale ====
16. Carnival Overture Opus 92, first theme

- Composer: Antonín Dvořák

17. "March of the Toreadors" from Carmen, Prelude to Act 1

- Composer: Georges Bizet

18. Alla Hornpipe from Water Music Suite, Movement #13

- Composer: George Fredrick Handel

19. Titan Symphony Symphony #1 in D Major, Movement #1

- Composer: Gustav Mahler

20. "Ode to Joy" Symphony #9 in D Minor (Choral), Movement #4

- Composer: Ludwig van Beethoven

21. Prelude to Act III "Lohengrin"

- Composer: Richard Wagner

22. Firebird Suite Finale

- Composer: Igor Stravinsky

23. "Great Gate of Kiev" from Pictures at an Exhibition

- Composer: Modest Mussorgsky

24. "Promenade" from Pictures at an Exhibition

- Composer: Modest Mussorgsky

25. 1812 Festival Overture second theme

- Composer: Pyotr Ilyich Tschaikovsky

Music produced by Don Dorsey

==== Post Show ====
Versions of "It's a Small World" and General Electric's theme were played.

=== New Year's Eve 1993 ===
For the New Year's Eve finale in 1992–1993, a version of "We've Just Begun To Dream" was played during the countdown, then a version of "Auld Lang Syne" followed by a short reprise of "We've Just Begun To Dream". Finally, a selection from Around the World with Mickey Mouse, that in the future would be played at the Fountain of Nations, was played.

== Holiday IllumiNations ==
Holiday IllumiNations

Epcot
- Area: World Showcase (World Showcase Lagoon)
- Status: Closed
- Opening date: 1994
- Closing date: 1998
- Replaced by: IllumiNations: Reflections of Earth with Holiday Tag

Ride statistics
- Sponsor: General Electric

Holiday IllumiNations played during the holiday season instead of the regular show. Starting in 2004, the "Let There Be Peace on Earth" segment of Holiday IllumiNations is played after IllumiNations: Reflections of Earth during the holiday season.

=== Show program ===
==== Opening ====
Good evening, this is Walter Cronkite. Tonight we welcome you to a joyous celebration of the season. Welcome, to Holiday IllumiNations.

— Walter Cronkite

1. Opening Medley
  - "Hark! The Herald Angels Sing"
  - "O Come All Ye Faithful"
  - "Joy to the World"
  - "Deck the Halls With Boughs of Holly"
  - "Angels We Have Heard on High"
2. Nutcracker Medley
  - "Marches"
  - "Dance of the Sugar Plum Fairies"
  - "Russian Dance (Trepak)"
3. O Holy Night
4. Chanukah Medley
  - "S'Vivon"
  - "The Trees in the Field"
5. Let There Be Peace on Earth

During this glorious time of year, there is one message that rings out around the world in every language. "Peace on earth, good will to men" is a wish to hold in our hearts throughout each passing year. A gift of immeasurable value, a treasure being handed down with care, from generation to generation. And so our holiday wish is that everyone, everywhere, share in the spirit of the season, peace on earth, good will to men.

— Finale intro

==== Closing ====
Thank you for joining us for this evening's performance of Holiday IllumiNations. On behalf of the Czech Symphonic Orchestra, The Boys Choir of Harlem, The Ramaz School Children's Choir, Mrs. Sandi Patti, and everyone at Walt Disney World, this is Walter Cronkite wishing you happy holidays, goodnight.

— Walter Cronkite

==== Post show ====
- "Joy to the World"
- "What Child Is This?"

=== Production ===
Narration

- Walter Cronkite

All Instrumentals

- Czech Symphonic Orchestra

All Chorus Parts

- The Sarah Moore Singers

O Holy Night

- Vocals by Sandi Patti

Let There Be Peace on Earth

- Vocals by The Boys Choir of Harlem

==== Show facts ====
- Opening date: 1994
- Closing date: 1998
- Duration: 12 minutes
- Sponsor: General Electric

== IllumiNations 25 (A) ==
IllumiNations 25 (A)

Epcot
- Area: World Showcase (World Showcase Lagoon)
- Status: Closed
- Opening date: September 21, 1996
- Closing date: May 18, 1997
- Replaced: IllumiNations
- Replaced by: IllumiNations 25 (B)

Ride statistics
- Sponsor: General Electric

Created for the 25th anniversary of Walt Disney World.

=== Show program ===
==== Opening ====
Good evening ladies and gentlemen, and welcome to IllumiNations 25, a celebration of the magic that you, our 25th anniversary guests of honor have brought to Walt Disney World for 25 magical years. Join us now as the countries of World Showcase welcome all of you to our world wide family.

— introduction

1. "Remember The Magic" – World Showcase Salute

- Canada
- Europe (Italy)
- France
- Germany
- United Kingdom (British Isles)
- Scandinavia (Norway)
- Africa (Morocco)
- China
- Japan
- Mexico
- United States

==== Act 1: World Showcase ====
2. "A Worldwide Celebration" (by Gregory Rians Smith)

3. Mascleta

- Calypso

4. "International Fantasy"

- Movements:
  - Asian
  - African
  - South American
  - British
  - Flamenco
  - Eastern European
  - Middle Eastern
  - Polka

5. Mascleta

- Calypso

==== Act 2: Future World ====
6. "Discovery Suite"

- Theme and Variations:
  - Life
  - Innoventions
  - Imagination
  - Seas
  - Land
  - Energy
  - Motion
  - Communication

==== Act 3: Finale ====
7. "Circle of Life"

==== Closing ====
The Epcot family and GE hope all of you from around the world have enjoyed IllumiNations 25. GE, we bring good things to life. Thank you, and good night.

— quotation

==== Post show ====
Versions of "A Worldwide Celebration" and General Electric's theme were played.

=== Production ===
1. "Remember The Magic" – World Showcase Salute
  - Based on the Walt Disney World 25th Anniversary tune
  - Lyricist: Cheryl Berman
  - Composer: Ira Antelis
  - Arranger & Orchestrator: Gregory Smith
2. "A Worldwide Celebration"
  - Composer & Orchestrator: Gregory Smith
3. Mascleta
  - Composer & Orchestrator: Gregory Smith
4. "International Fantasy"
  - Composer & Orchestrator: Gregory Smith
5. "Discovery Suite"
  - Based on "We've Just Begun to Dream" (EPCOT Center fanfare) by Steve Skorija, Gregory Smith, and Jack Eskew
  - Composer & Orchestrator: Gregory Smith
6. "Circle of Life"
  - Lyricist: Tim Rice
  - Composer: Elton John
  - Arrangers: Gregory Smith & Oliver Wells
  - Orchestrator: Gregory Smith

=== Production From CD ===
- Music produced by Steve Skorija
- Music supervision by Dan Savant
- All songs except "Circle of Life" arranged by Gregory Smith
- "Circle of Life" arranged by Oliver Wells
- Vocals recorded by Andy de Ganahl at Starke Lake Studios, Orlando, Florida
- Mixed by Eric Shilling at Starke Lake Studios, Orlando, Florida
- Digital editing by Michael Atwell
- Vocal solo in "Circle of Life" by John Madgett
- Special thanks to: The Florida Mass Choir under the direction of Arthur Jones, Taz Morosi, and Keith Dyer
- Chorus:
  - Sarah Moore (leader)
  - Amy Martin-Cole
  - Michelle Amato-Hann
  - Greg Whipple
  - Randy Nichols
  - Scott Harell

==== Show facts ====
- Opening date: September 21, 1996
- Closing date: May 18, 1997
- Duration: 12 minutes
- Sponsor: General Electric
- Soundtrack: Disneyland/Walt Disney World Music Vacation
- The selections "A Worldwide Celebration", Mascleta, "International Fantasy" & "Discovery Suite" can be found on Disney's Music From The Park (1996 CD).

== IllumiNations 25 (B) ==
IllumiNations 25 (B)

Epcot
- Area: World Showcase (World Showcase Lagoon)
- Status: Closed
- Opening date: May 19, 1997
- Closing date: January 31, 1998
- Replaced: IllumiNations 25 (A)
- Replaced by: IllumiNations 98

Ride statistics
- Sponsor: General Electric

Still celebrating the 25th anniversary of Walt Disney World Resort, but the classical music returns.

=== Show program ===
1. "Remember The Magic" – World Showcase Salute (Based on the Walt Disney World 25th Anniversary tune) [1996]

- Lyricist: Cheryl Berman
- Composer: Ira Antelis
- Arranger: Gregory Smith
- Orchestrator: Gregory Smith
- Singer: Brian McKnight

2. "IllumiNations Fanfare" [1997]

- Arranger: John Debney
- Orchestrator: Brad Dechter

==== Act I: World Showcase ====
3. Russian Dance – "Trepak" from The Nutcracker Ballet [1892]

- Composer: Peter Ilyich Tchaikovsky
- Arranger: John Debney
- Orchestrator: Brad Dechter

4. "Die Meistersinger Overture" from Die Meistersinger von Nürnberg [1862–67]

- Composer: Richard Wagner
- Arranger: John Debney
- Orchestrator: Brad Dechter

5. "Laideronette, Empress of the Pagodas" from "Ma Mére l'Oye" (Mother Goose Suite) [1910]

- Composer: Maurice Ravel
- Arranger: John Debney
- Orchestrator: Brad Dechter

6. "Barber of Seville Overture" from Il barbiere de Siviglia (The Barber of Seville) [1816]

- Composer: Gioacchino Rossini
- Arranger: John Debney
- Orchestrator: Brad Dechter

7. "Overture" to Suite No. 2 from Daphnis et Chloé Ballet [1912]

- Composer: Maurice Ravel
- Arranger: John Debney
- Orchestrator: Brad Dechter

8. "Seventeen Come Sunday" March from English Folk Song Suite [1924]

- Composer: Ralph Vaughan Williams
- Arranger: John Debney
- Orchestrator: Brad Dechter

9. "El Salòn México" [1936]

- Composer: Aaron Copland
- Arranger: John Debney
- Orchestrator: Brad Dechter

10. "Hoedown" from Rodeo Ballet [1942]

- Composer: Aaron Copland
- Arranger: John Debney
- Orchestrator: Brad Dechter

==== Act II: Future World ====
11. "Pini della Villa Borghese" from The Pines of Rome Symphonic Poem [1919]

- Composer: Ottorino Respighi
- Arranger: John Debney
- Orchestrator: Brad Dechter

12. "The Aquarium" from Le Carnival des Animaux (The Carnival of the Animals) [1907]

- Composer: Camille Saint-Saëns
- Arranger: John Debney
- Orchestrator: Brad Dechter

13. "Hornpipe" from Water Music Suite [1717]

- Composer: George Frideric Händel
- Arranger: John Debney
- Orchestrator: Brad Dechter

14. "A Night on Bald Mountain" [1886]

- Composer: Modest Mussorgsky
- Arranger: John Debney
- Orchestrator: Brad Dechter

15. "Jupiter, the Bringer of Jollity" from The Planets Suite [1914–1916]

- Composer: Gustav Holst
- Arranger: John Debney
- Orchestrator: Brad Dechter

16. "El Sombrero de Tres Picos" from The Three-Cornered Hat Ballet [1917]

- Composer: Manuel de Falla
- Arranger: John Debney
- Orchestrator: Brad Dechter

17. "Ode To Joy" Symphony No. 9 in D minor (Choral), Fourth Movement [1824]

- Composer: Ludwig van Beethoven
- Arranger: John Debney
- Orchestrator: Brad Dechter
  (Soundtrack Version)
- Conductor: Georg Solti
  (Walt Disney World Version)

==== Post Show ====
"A Worldwide Celebration" [1996]

- Composer: Gregory Smith
- Orchestrator: Gregory Smith

==== Show facts ====
- Opening date: May 19, 1997
- Closing date: January 31, 1998
- Duration: 13 minutes
- Sponsor: General Electric
- Soundtrack: Disneyland/Walt Disney World: The Official Album (1997 CD)

== IllumiNations '98 ==
IllumiNations '98

Epcot
- Area: World Showcase (World Showcase Lagoon)
- Status: Closed
- Opening date: February 1, 1998
- Closing date: September 21, 1999
- Replaced: IllumiNations 25 (B)
- Replaced by: IllumiNations: Reflections of Earth

Ride statistics
- Music: Disneyland/Walt Disney World: The Official Album (1997 CD)
- Duration: 13:00
- Sponsor: General Electric

Same soundtrack as IllumiNations 25 (B) but without the 25th anniversary announcement.

=== Opening ===
Good evening ladies and gentlemen, and welcome to IllumiNations. Join us now as the countries of World Showcase welcome all of you to our world wide family.

— quotation

== See also ==
- Epcot attraction and entertainment history
- IllumiNations: Reflections of Earth
