= Tomb of Li Bai =

- 李白墓
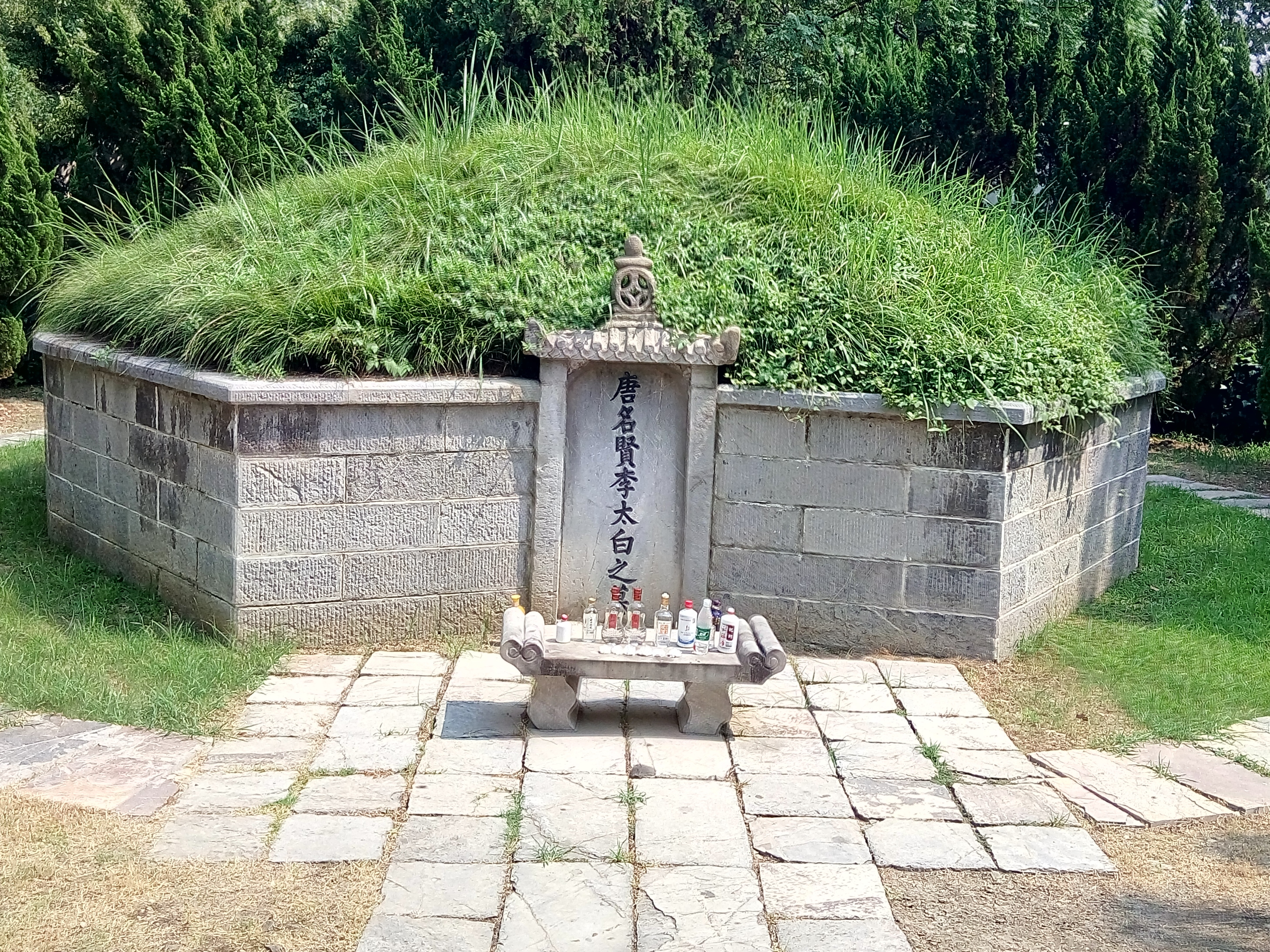

- Location within China

General information
- Type: Tomb
- Location: Dangtu County, Anhui, China
- Coordinates: 31°29′52″N 118°31′32″E
- Groundbreaking: 762
- Completed: 762
- Relocated: 817

Technical details
- Material: Stone

The Tomb of Li Bai (Chinese: 李白墓; pinyin: Lǐ Bái Mù) is the tomb of Li Bai, a Chinese poet acclaimed from his own day to the present as a genius and a romantic figure who took traditional poetic forms to new heights. The tomb is located at the western foot of Green Mountain (青山) in Dangtu County, Anhui, China.

== History ==
Li Bai died in 762, during the ruling of Emperor Suzong (756–762) of Tang dynasty (618–907). Li Yangbing, the then magistrate of Dangtu County and relative of Li Bai, buried him at the eastern foot of Dragon Mountain (龙山). In 817, Fan Chuanzheng (范传正), son of Li's friend, alongside Zhuge Zong (诸葛纵), the then magistrate of Dangtu County, reburied him at the western foot of Green Mountain (青山).

In 2006, it was declared a "Major National Historical and Cultural Sites in Anhui" by the State Council of China.

== Gallery ==
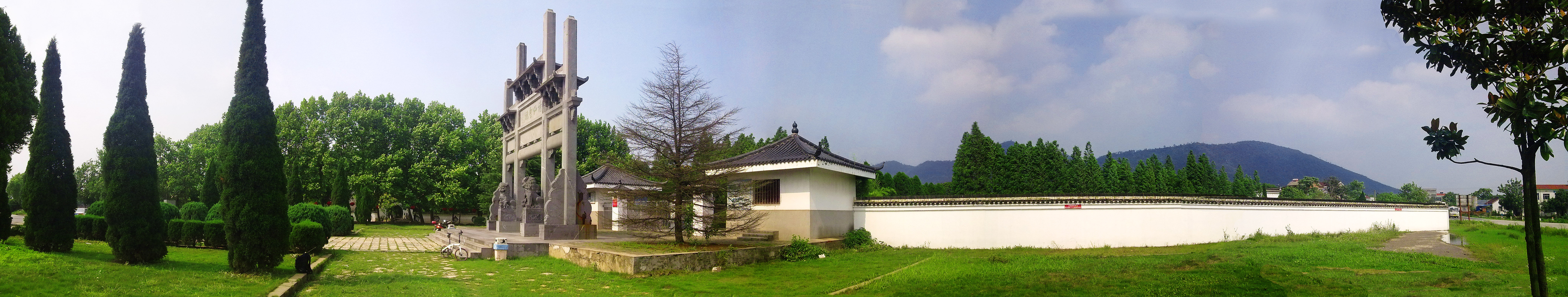
Panorama of the Tomb of Li Bai
