= Wonders of China =

Attraction at China Pavilion at Epcot

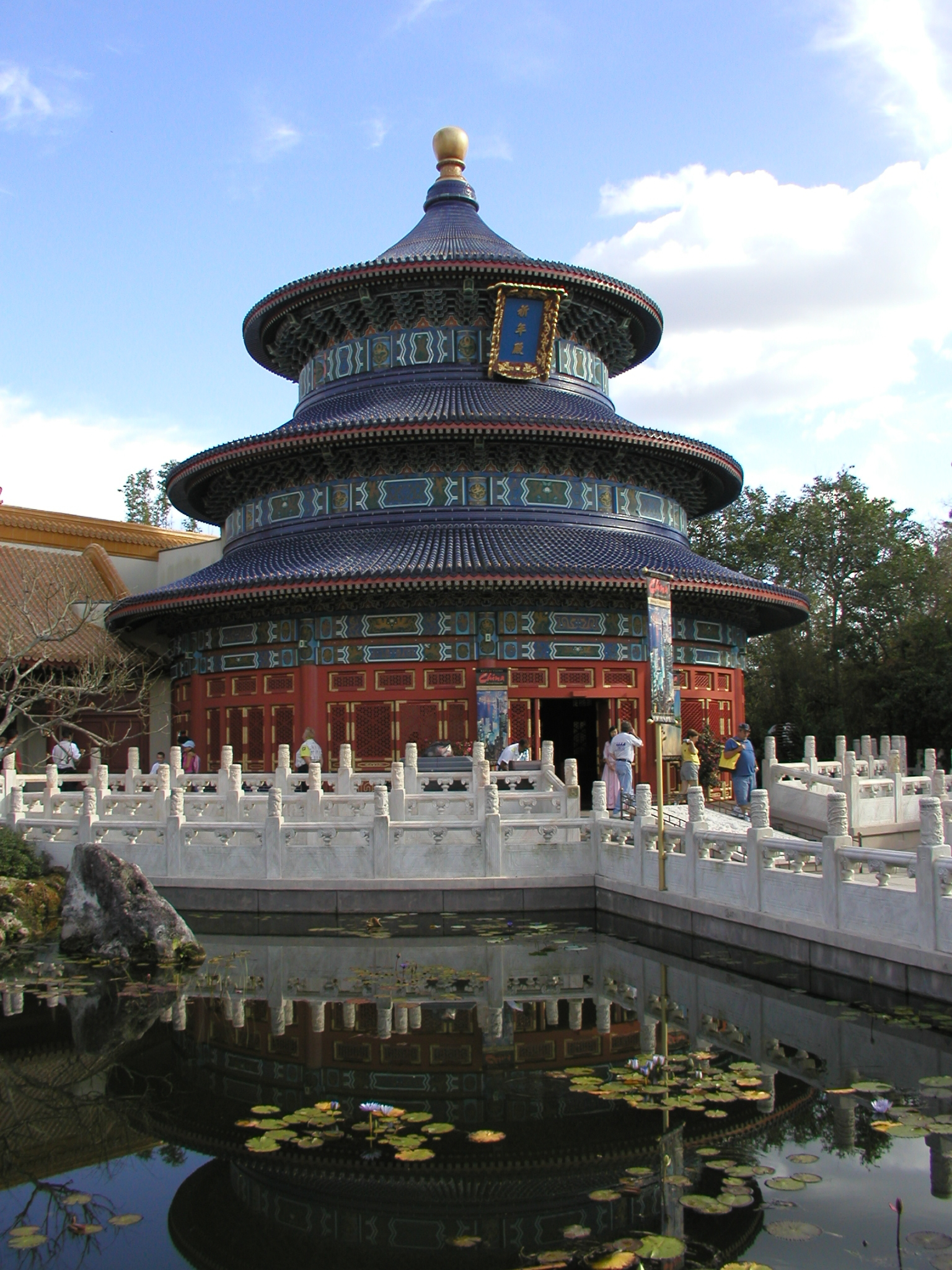
- Wonders of China played at the China pavilion at Epcot

Epcot
- Area: World Showcase, China Pavilion
- Status: Removed
- Opening date: October 1, 1982
- Closing date: March 25, 2003
- Replaced by: Reflections of China

Disneyland
- Area: Tomorrowland
- Status: Removed
- Opening date: 1984
- Closing date: 1996
- Replaced: America the Beautiful
- Replaced by: America the Beautiful

Ride statistics
- Attraction type: Circle-Vision 360° film
- Designer: WED Enterprises
- Theme: Chinese Travelogue
- Duration: 19 minutes
- Wheelchair accessible
- Assistive listening available
- Closed captioning available

Wonders of China was a Circle-Vision 360° film featured in the China Pavilion at Epcot at the Walt Disney World Resort.

== Summary ==
The film showcased famous Chinese landmarks and the people, environment, and culture of China. Keye Luke provided the voice-over narration as the philosopher Li Bai, while a Chinese actor Shih Kuan appears in the film's live action footage.

== History ==
Wonders of China was first shown on October 1, 1982, and closed on March 25, 2003. It was replaced by an updated film, Reflections of China, which opened on May 23, 2003.

Wonders of China also played in the World Premiere Circle-Vision theater in Tomorrowland at Disneyland from 1984 through 1996.
