= Richard Bellis =

American composer

- Born: April 3, 1946 (age 80); Pasadena, California
- Occupation: Composer

Richard Bellis (born April 3, 1946) is an American film and television music composer, former president of the Composers and Lyricists Guild of America (CLGA), former governor of the ATAS, lecturer at USC, musical director and former child actor.

== Biography ==
=== Early life and career ===
Born in Pasadena, Bellis was a child actor and auditioned to be a Mouseketeer. He attended John Muir High School, from which he graduated in 1964. Bellis has directed the ASCAP Film Scoring Workshop for many years.

Bellis has composed and arranged music for the Disney theme parks, starting with arranging music for the opening of the EPCOT Center. He also wrote, adapted, and arranged music for Captain EO, Star Tours, Indiana Jones Epic Stunt Spectacular, The Twilight Zone Tower of Terror, ExtraTERRORestrial Alien Encounter, Indiana Jones Adventure, Lights, Motors, Action!: Extreme Stunt Show, Reflections of China, and the Mexico Pavilion at Epcot. Bellis has also written scores for a number of television films.

When opportunities for composing dried up, he started a woodworking business with his wife. They built rack-mounted cabinets and console surrounds for those he knew in the music industry, as well as kitchen cabinets and conference room tables.

=== Stephen King's It ===
When writing for Stephen King's It in 1990, Bellis was inspired by Bernard Herrmann, particularly his use of motifs and ostinatos. The music for It was a mixture of circus and carnival music and features a calliope. When Emmy submissions came, they could only submit one episode, and chose to submit the first. As a result, he received both his first Emmy nomination and first win, for "Outstanding Individual Achievement in Music Composition for a miniseries or a special (dramatic underscore)", in 1991. He was interviewed in a 2021 documentary film Pennywise: The Story of It.

== Works ==
- The Emerging Film Composer: An Introduction to the People, Problems, and Psychology of the Film Music Business. February 2, 2007. ISBN 978-0-615-13623-3.

== Awards ==
Outstanding Individual Achievement in Music Composition for a miniseries or a special (dramatic underscore)
Year: 1991
Work: Stephen King's It
Status: Winner
Outstanding Individual Achievement in Music Composition for a miniseries or a special (dramatic underscore)
Year: 1992
Work: Doublecrossed
Status: Nominee
Outstanding Individual Achievement in Music Composition for a miniseries or a special (dramatic underscore)
Year: 1994
Work: Double, Double, Toil And Trouble
Status: Nominee
