= Reflections of China =

Attraction at China Pavilion at Epcot

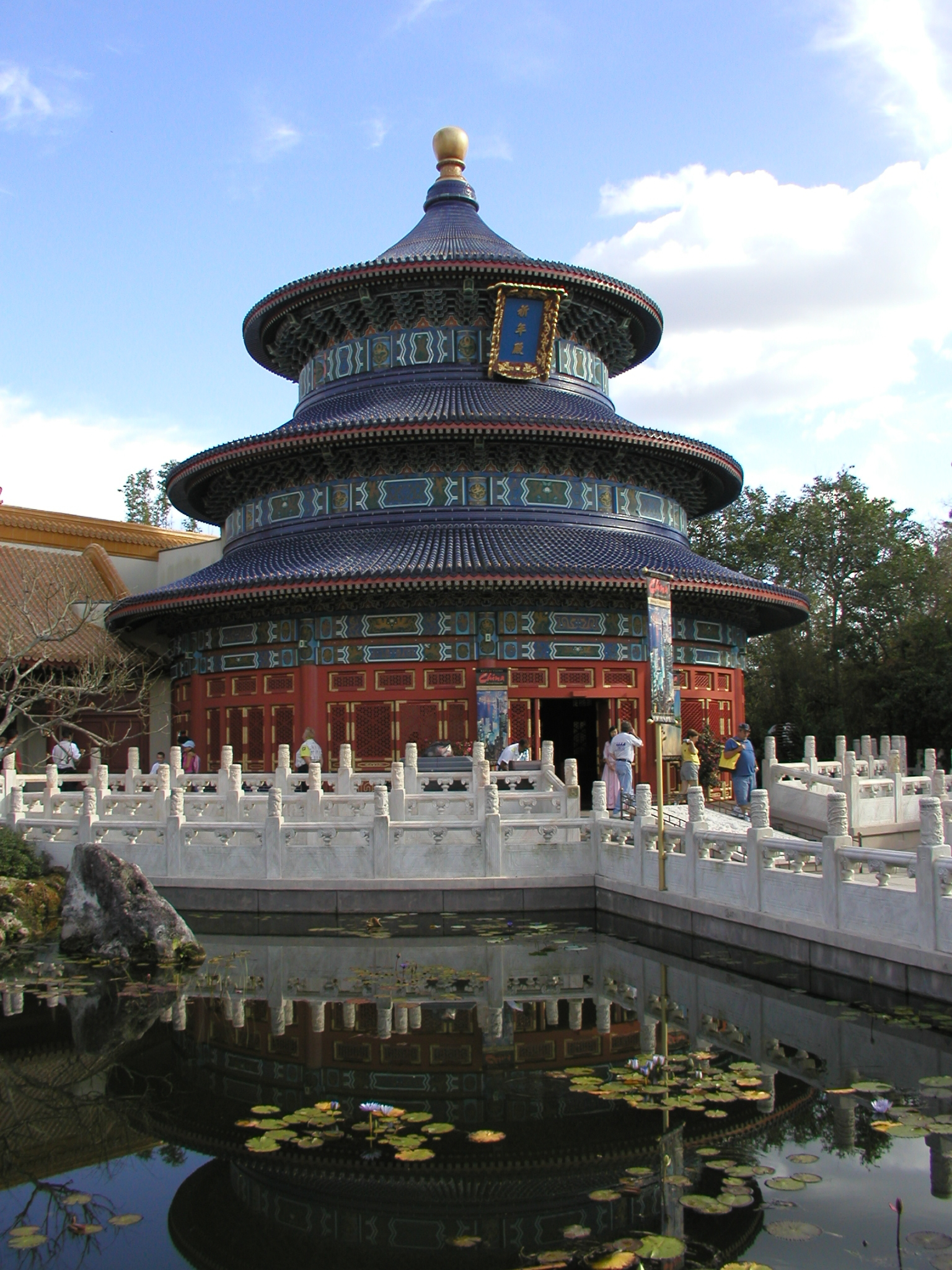
- The Temple of Heaven is the entrance to the Reflections of China theater.

Epcot
- Area: World Showcase, China Pavilion
- Status: Operating
- Opening date: May 22, 2003
- Replaced: The Wonders of China (1982–2003)

Ride statistics
- Attraction type: Circle-Vision 360° Theater
- Designer: Walt Disney Imagineering
- Theme: Sights in China
- Music: Composed by Richard Bellis
- Duration: 12:30
- Wheelchair accessible
- Assistive listening available
- Closed captioning available

Reflections of China is a Circle-Vision 360° documentary at the China Pavilion at Epcot, part of Epcot's World Showcase at Walt Disney World Resort in Florida.

== Summary ==
The show is narrated by an actor playing Li Bai, an ancient Chinese poet, who takes the viewer on a tour of the Chinese countryside and historical structures and buildings. Some sites that are seen are The Great Wall of China, The Forbidden City in Beijing, the Terracotta Army in Xi'an, Hunan, Guilin, Suzhou, Hong Kong, and Shanghai.

== History ==
Reflections of China replaced Wonders of China in 2003.

Reflections of China will be replaced by a new film, Wondrous China, which was originally set to open in 2021, as part of Walt Disney World's 50th anniversary celebration, but was cancelled indefinitely until further notice, due to the COVID-19 pandemic.
