= Quiet Night Thought =

Poem by Li Bai

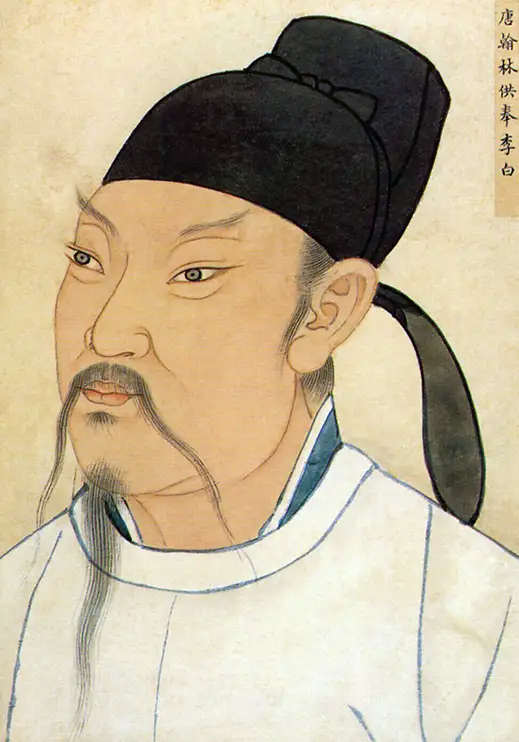
Li Bai

Quiet Night Thought (simplified Chinese: 静夜思; traditional Chinese: 靜夜思; pinyin: Jìng Yè Sī) is a famous poem written by the Tang dynasty poet Li Bai.

== Text ==
The text below is a Qing-dynasty version, with Mandarin pronunciation.

《靜夜思》
(Traditional)

床前明月光
疑是地上霜
舉頭望明月
低頭思故鄉

《静夜思》
(Simplified)

床前明月光
疑是地上霜
举头望明月
低头思故乡

"Jìng yè sī"
(Pinyin)

Chuáng qián míngyuè guāng
Yí shì dìshang shuāng
Jǔtóu wàng míngyuè
Dītóu sī gùxiāng

"Quiet Night Thoughts"
(Translation)

Moonlight falls in front of my bed,
You'd think there was frost on the ground.
I lift my head and gaze at the bright moon,
I lower my head and think of my old home.

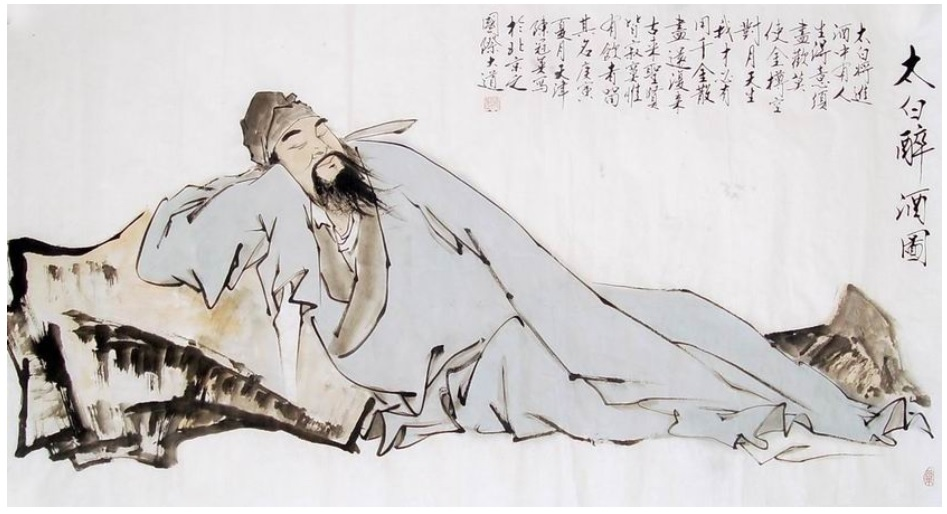
A Painting of Li Bai with his poetry

=== Variants ===
There are other versions of this poem that replace "the bright moonlight" (明月光) with "I see the moonlight" (看月光) and/or "gazing at the bright moon" (望明月) with "gazing at the mountain and the moon" (望山月). The insertion of the character 明 (míng "light/bright") into poetry was common practice during the Ming dynasty (大明), whose Chinese name features this character. For a 17th-century edition of the poem, see the example, with notes, in Rare Book Preservation Society § Li Bai Tang poem.

==== List of variants ====
Variants of "Quiet Night Thought"
Source	Dynasty	Text
Anthology of Yuefu Poetry (樂府詩集) by Guo Maoqian (郭茂倩)	Northern Song	床前看月光，疑是地上霜。舉頭望山月，低頭思故鄉。
Mutian Jinyu (木天禁語) by Fan Peng (范梈)	Yuan	忽見明月光，疑是地上霜。起頭望明月，低頭思故鄉。
Ten Thousand Jueju Poems by Tang People (唐人萬首絕句) by Zhao Guang (趙光)	Ming	床前看月光，疑是地上霜。舉頭望明月，低頭思故鄉。
Tang Shi Ping Hui (唐詩品彙) by Gao Bing (高棅)	Ming	床前明月光，疑是地上霜。舉頭望山月，低頭思故鄉。
Complete Tang Poems (全唐詩) by Peng Dingqiu (彭定求)	Qing	床前看月光，疑是地上霜。舉頭望山月，低頭思故鄉。
Anthology of Tang Poems (唐詩別裁集) by Shen Deqian (沈德潛)	Qing	床前明月光，疑是地上霜。舉頭望山月，低頭思故鄉。
Three Hundred Tang Poems (唐詩三百首) by Sun Zhu (孫洙)	Qing	床前明月光，疑是地上霜。舉頭望明月，低頭思故鄉。

== Background and evaluation ==
It is likely that Li Bai drew inspiration for the poem through his personal experiences as a Confucian poet-scholar detached from his hometown. As Annping Chin notes in her commentary on The Analects, “The urge to go home has been an important theme in the writings of the Chinese scholar-officials.” In Imperial China, scholars and artisans affiliated with the court were often detached from their hometowns for extended periods of time as part of their duties and loyalties to the Emperor of China. While it was expected in traditional Confucian ritual to remain a loyal (zhōng 忠) subject to the Emperor, filial piety (xiào 孝) also formed one of the foundations of Confucian thought, emphasizing the importance of honoring and respecting one's parents and ancestry. A Chinese proverb even notes how it was often difficult to uphold the values of loyalty to an Emperor while also maintaining filial piety towards one's parents at the same time (忠孝不能两全). However, through his poem, it can be said that Li Bai fulfills both his responsibilities of loyalty to the Emperor as well as his duties of filial piety to his ascendants as he expresses his yearning for his hometown, in accordance with Confucian values, while remaining loyal to imperial edict, again in accordance to Confucian values.

The poem is one of Li's shi poems, structured as a single quatrain in five-character regulated verse with a simple AABA rhyme scheme (at least in its original Middle Chinese dialect as well as the majority of contemporary Chinese dialects). It is short and direct in accordance with the guidelines for shi poetry, and cannot be conceived as purely a personal poem, but as a poem relatable to all those detached from their hometowns out of obligation. Hence, in contrast to Li Bai's longer, more free-form gushi, "Quiet Night Thought" is vague, yet expresses solemnity and yearning through a combination of its night-time imagery and its spare form.

Quiet Night Thought has often been in talks in relation to Tang-dynasty scholars who served away from their native regions, where a disconnect from their families’ ancestral homes was a common experience. In Confucian culture, filial piety highlighted attachment to one’s origins, while loyalty to imperial service required great emotional restraint. The poem’s moon imagery, traditionally associated with memory and reunion in Chinese literature, situates the work within a broader cultural tradition rather than a purely personal reflection.

== Legacy ==
Since its conception during the Tang dynasty, "Quiet Night Thought" remains one of Li Bai's most famous and memorable poems. It is featured in classic Chinese poetry anthologies such as the Three Hundred Tang Poems and is popularly taught in Chinese-language schools as part of Chinese literature curricula. It is also commonly taught as one of the earliest works of Chinese poetry in the education of juniors for its relative simplicity and straightforward yet effective use of imagery to provoke basic Confucian values.

== See also ==
- Li Bai
- Tang poetry
