= Cathay (poetry collection) =

Poetry collection by Ezra Pound

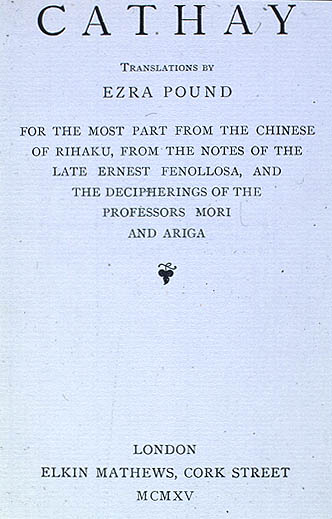
Ezra Pound's Cathay, published by Elkin Mathews, London, April 1915

Cathay (1915) is a collection of classical Chinese poetry that primarily features the works of the 8th-century Tang Dynasty poet Li Bai, translated into English by modernist poet Ezra Pound, based on Ernest Fenollosa's notes that came into Pound's possession in 1913. At first Pound used the notes to translate Noh plays and then to translate Chinese poetry to English, despite a complete lack of knowledge of the Chinese language. The volume's 15 poems are seen less as strict translations and more as new pieces in their own right; and, in his bold translations of works from a language he was unfamiliar with, Pound set the stage for modernist translations.

== Background ==
In 1909 Pound was living in London working as secretary to W. B. Yeats. Interested in Asian art and literature, the two poets often visited the Asian exhibits at the British Museum. Pound had previously become acquainted with Laurence Binyon, a curator of Asian art at the museum and author of Flight of the Dragons: An Essay on the Theory and Practice of Art in China and Japan. Binyon and Pound shared a view of Asian art, seeing in it a respect for tradition coupled with innovative ideas, which appealed to Pound's sense of modernity and his motto about art, to "make it new". Soon after Pound read Herbert Giles's A History of Modern Literature (1901), from which he took inspiration to try his hand at translating Chinese poetry.

Late in 1913, Pound met the recently widowed wife of Ernest Fenollosa, Mary McNeil Fenollosa, at a literary salon in London. She had read his poems, had a favorable opinion of him, and invited the young poet to organize and edit her husband's notes. Fenollosa had died two years earlier, leaving behind a large collection of disorganized notes and unpublished manuscripts based on two decades spent living, teaching, and studying in Asia.

The papers were sent to Pound in London and upon examining them his first task was to rewrite Fenollosa's basic translations of Noh plays, often in the form of poetry. These were to become the basis for Pound's translations of Noh plays and Asian poetry. The notes included translations of Chinese Taoist poetry; Pound quickly saw that the poetry was "terse, polished [and] emotionally suggestive". The translations Pound made of the 15 poems collected in Cathay were directly derived from Fenollosa's notes. The volume was published by Elkin Mathews in London, with a print-run of 1,000, on April 6, 1915.

== Style and themes ==
Pound worked on the poems in Cathay during the period he made a move from imagism to vorticism. Pound critic Zhaoming Qian calls "The River Merchant's Wife: A Letter", "The Jewell Stairs' Grievance" and "The Exile's Letter" "imagist and vorticist masterpieces".

The opening poem, "Song of the Bowmen of Shu", shows the dominant themes of separation and loneliness, especially the loneliness of the soldier. This is evident also in "Lament of the Frontier Guard", and is perhaps suggestive of Pound's great distress at the loss of life during World War One. Pound used imagery to convey inarticulate emotions in the poems. For example, in "The Jewel Stairs Grievance" a woman waits impatiently; yet her impatience is never directly mentioned and is instead subtly suggested and conveyed through the poem's images. Eventually Pound would use Fenollosa's work as a starting point for what he called the ideogrammic method.

== Translations ==
Neither Pound nor Fenollosa spoke or read Chinese proficiently, and Pound was working from the posthumous notes of an American who had studied Chinese under a Japanese teacher. Nevertheless, according to Michael Alexander, there are competent judges of Chinese and English poetry who see Pound's work as the best translations of Chinese to English poetry ever made, though scholars have complained that it contains many mistakes. Pound has been criticized for omitting or adding sections to his poems which have no basis in the original texts, though critics argue that the fidelity of Cathay to the original Chinese is beside the point.

Chinese critic Wai-lim Yip wrote: "One can easily excommunicate Pound from the Forbidden City of Chinese studies, but it seems clear that in his dealings with Cathay, even when he is given only the barest details, he is able to get into the central concerns of the original author by what we may perhaps call a kind of clairvoyance." Asian and American literature scholar Steven Yao writes that Pound saw in his lack of formal Chinese training a kind of freedom that allowed him to interpret the Chinese characters in a manner he saw fit, making the work closer to a newly written original piece instead of a mere translation.

In Argentina, the poet Juan Arabia will publish in 2020 a Spanish edition of Cathay that includes annotations by Wang Yin and an epilogue by Forrest Gander.

== Reception ==
The volume was published during a period when Pound felt despondent about his work, and he added a defense on the last page: "I give only these unquestionable poems ...[otherwise] it is quite certain that the personal hatred by which I am held by many, and the invidia which is directed against me because I have dared openly to declare my belief in certain young artists will be brought to bear on the flaws of such translations". Nonetheless upon the publication of the volume W. B. Yeats, Ford Madox Ford, William Carlos Williams and T. S. Eliot remarked on the nature of the poems, their "robustness", with Ford stating in his review of the book that, were these Pound's original verses, they would make him the greatest poet of the day.

== Sources ==
- Alexander, Michael. (1981). The Poetic Achievement of Ezra Pound. Berkeley: University of California Press. ISBN 978-0-7486-0981-9
- Kenner, Hugh. (1973). The Pound Era. Berkeley: University of California Press. ISBN 978-0-520-02427-4
- Moody, David A. (2007). Ezra Pound: Poet: A Portrait of the Man and His Work, Volume I, The Young Genius 1885–1920. Oxford: Oxford University Press. ISBN 978-0-19-957146-8
- Nadel, Ira. (1999). "Introduction", in Ira Nadel (ed). Introduction: Understanding Pound. Cambridge: Cambridge University Press. ISBN 978-0-521-64920-9
- Qian, Zhaoming. (2010). The Orient. Ira B. Nadel (editor), in Ezra Pound in Context. Cambridge: Cambridge University Press. ISBN 978-0-521-51507-8
- Tryphonopoulos, (2005). Demetres P. and Stephen Adams (eds). The Ezra Pound Encyclopedia. Westport, Connecticut: Greenwood. ISBN 978-0-313-30448-4
- Stock, Noel. (1970). The Life of Ezra Pound. New York: Pantheon Books.
- Xie, Ming. (1999). "Pound as Translator". in Ira Nadel (ed). The Cambridge Companion to Ezra Pound. Cambridge: Cambridge University Press. ISBN 9780521649209
- Yao, Steven G. (2010). "Translation", Ira B. Nadel (editor), in Ezra Pound in Context. Cambridge: Cambridge University Press. ISBN 978-0-521-51507-8
