= The River Merchant's Wife: A Letter =

Ezra Pound's translation of Li Bai's poem

"The River Merchant's Wife: A Letter" is a four stanza poem, written in free verse, and loosely translated by Ezra Pound from a poem by Chinese poet Li Bai, called Chánggān Xíng, or Changgan song. It first appeared in Pound's 1915 collection Cathay. It is the most widely anthologized poem of the collection.

== Reception ==
In addition to "The Jewel Stairs' Grievance" and "The Exile's Letter", also included in the collection, Zhaoming Qian has referred to "The River Merchant's Wife" as an "imagist and vorticist [masterpiece]". On the other hand, Pound's text has been criticised for losing some of the Chinese cultural specifics of the original.

The poem is written from the perspective of a girl married to a river merchant, and describes her gradually increasing affection for him and the pain she feels when he is away.

== Summary ==
The first stanza of the poem introduces a young girl, the narrator of the poem, who describes her life through childhood imagery of playfulness and innocence. It recounts how she married her husband when they were both very young and innocent. She was shy and seemed unhappy as she didn't respond when spoken to and kept her head bowed.

When she was fifteen, a year after she got married, she fell deeply in love with her husband, to whom she previously referred as My Lord. She wanted to live and die with him. The second stanza describes the passionate love of a young couple.

In the third stanza, she recounts how her husband left for work as a fisherman and left her behind. He has gone now for five months and even the monkeys in her village seem sorrowful to her.
