= Li Yangbing =

8th-century Chinese calligrapher, poet, and politician

Li Yangbing (traditional Chinese: 李陽冰; simplified Chinese: 李阳冰; pinyin: Lǐ Yángbīng; Wade–Giles: Li Yang-ping), courtesy name Shaowen (少溫), was a Chinese calligrapher, poet, and politician of the Tang dynasty. A high-ranking government official (imperial magistrate), literary figure, noted calligrapher, and relative of the famous Tang Chinese poet Li Bai, Li Yangbing is notable for being the initial editor and compiler of the poetry of Li Bai; also for writing a preface to this which is important as one of the few primary historical sources on Li Bai.

Li Yangbing was from Zhao County, Hebei. His first government position was as an official in Jinyun County, Zhejiang Province. In 755, An Lushan declared himself Emperor, fielding military forces against the ruling Emperor, Xuanzong. In the ensuing eight years of the disorders, largely conducted under Generals An Lushan and Shi Siming, death and famine stalked the Central Plain of China, and the population decreased by the tens-of-millions. By 762, the imperial troops had retaken both sides of the Yellow River (most of Hebei and Henan), the rebels were mostly dead and the remnants beleaguered; and, on May 18, Daizong acceded to the throne as Emperor. In Daizong's first year, Li Yangbing, having succeeded in his career despite the sociopolitical turmoil, was still a powerful government officer, and accordingly was in Baoying County, Jiangsu Province.

In the meantime, things had not gone so well for Li Yangbing's close relative, the famous poet and former court favorite, Li Bai; who had recently fallen under political scrutiny, and had narrowly escaped a death sentence. Li Bai was condemned and en route to exile, but was then reprieved – all due to the intervention of leading Tang General Guo Ziyi. Looking for a place of refuge, Li Bai headed for Dangtu, on the southern bank of the Yangzi River (now part of Ma'anshan, in today's Anhui Province), where his relative Li Yangbing was now governor. (Li Yangbing was probably Li Bai's father's younger brother.)

When his famous relative Li Bai arrived in Dangtu, in his skiff, Li Yangbing was the chief magistrate there; although this governmental service was not what his "heart coveted", and nearing retirement. Li Bai, older than Li Yangbing, became progressively sick, to the point of being a bed-ridden invalid. Already near retirement, Li Yangbing visited Li Bai on his death bed, where he was entrusted with the care of Li Bai's hastily scrawled and disorganized poetry manuscripts.

In his retirement, Li Yangbing was able to use his literary and calligraphic talents to prepare the first corpus of collected Li Bai poetry; despite that, according to Li Yangbing, out of the eight years of the An Shi Rebellion turmoil, Li Bai's "Writings of those years were lost, nine out of ten. What are preserved ... are for the most part what I obtained from others." Li Yangbing's diligence in collecting, editing, and publishing Li Bai's poems would eventually lead to the first collected works of Li Bai's poems, with results which would resound through the literary world through the centuries, and which re-echo even through the present day.

== See also ==
- History of the administrative divisions of China (disambiguation)
- Classical Chinese poetry
- Ma'anshan
- Provinces in the Tang dynasty
