= China Pavilion at Epcot =

Pavilion of World Showcase in Epcot

China Pavilion

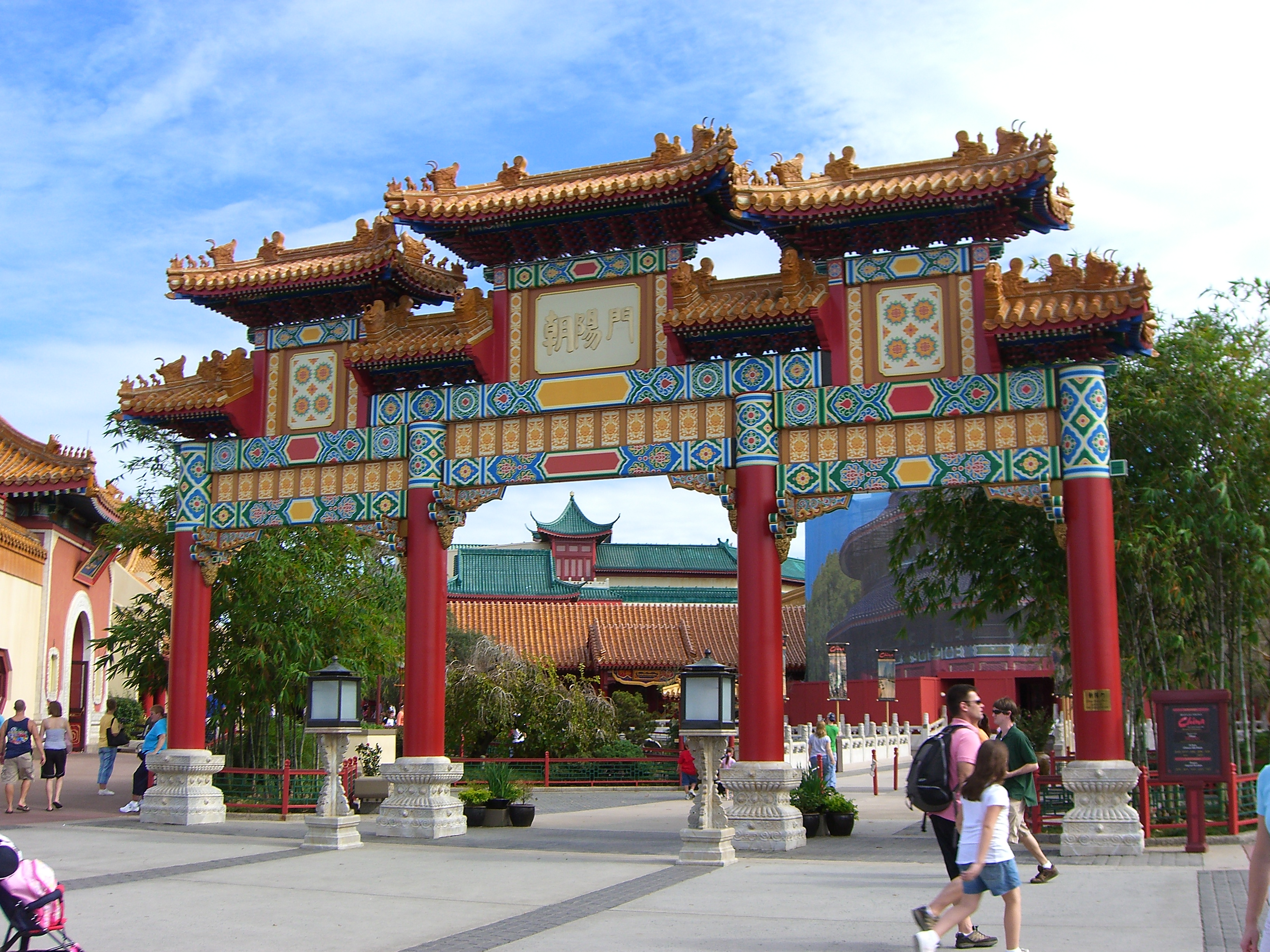
- Paifang gate to China in front of the temple and stores

Epcot
- Area: World Showcase
- Coordinates: 28°22′12″N 81°32′46″W
- Status: Operating
- Opening date: October 1, 1982

Ride statistics
- Attraction type: Themed Pavilion
- Theme: Ancient Chinese city

The China Pavilion is a Chinese-themed pavilion that is part of the World Showcase within Epcot at Walt Disney World in Bay Lake, Florida, United States. Its location is between the Norway and Germany pavilions.

== Layout ==
Visitors enter the China Pavilion through a large Chinese gate. The courtyard is dominated by a replica of the Temple of Heaven, which contains the entrance to "Reflections of China", a Circle-Vision 360° movie exploring China's history and scenery, as well as a museum containing several ancient Chinese artifacts. The courtyard is bordered by shops selling Chinese merchandise, and two Chinese restaurants. The pavilion is decorated with ponds, crossed by bridges. Chinese acrobats also perform frequently in the pavilion.

The pavilion served as the backdrop for the music video of the song "Reflection", performed by the then-unknown Christina Aguilera, from the 1998 Disney film Mulan.

== Attractions and services ==
=== Attractions ===
- EPCOT World Showcase Adventure
  - DuckTales World Showcase Adventure (2022-Present)
- Circle-Vision 360°:
  - Reflections of China (2003-present)

=== Former Attractions ===
- Circle-Vision 360°:
  - Wonders of China (1982-2003)
- EPCOT World Showcase Adventure
  - Kim Possible World Showcase Adventure (2009 - 2012)
  - Agent P World Showcase Adventure (2012 - 2020)

=== Exhibition ===
- House of the Whispering Willows
  - Inside Shanghai Disney Resort, Discover the wonders of Shanghai Disney Resort at a gallery featuring exclusive artwork from the newest Disney destination.

=== Former exhibition ===
- House of the Whispering Willows
  - Kingdom of Dreams: Imagineering Hong Kong Disneyland, Discover the wonders of Hong Kong Disneyland, as a preview center, at a gallery featuring exclusive artwork from the newest Disney destination.

=== Shopping ===
- Good Fortune Gifts, sells a variety of items including parasols, puppets, toys and hats.
- House of Good Fortune, sells items such as housewares, tea sets, wall prints, silk robes, and porcelain goods.

=== Dining ===
- Nine Dragons Restaurant, a full-service gourmet Chinese restaurant featuring traditional Chinese cuisine with a twist.
- Lotus Blossom Cafe, a counter-service restaurant that serves well-known American-Chinese dishes.

=== Live entertainment ===
- Dragon Legend Acrobats, a team of young acrobats who perform feats in the outdoor courtyard.

=== Characters ===
- Mulan

== Gallery ==
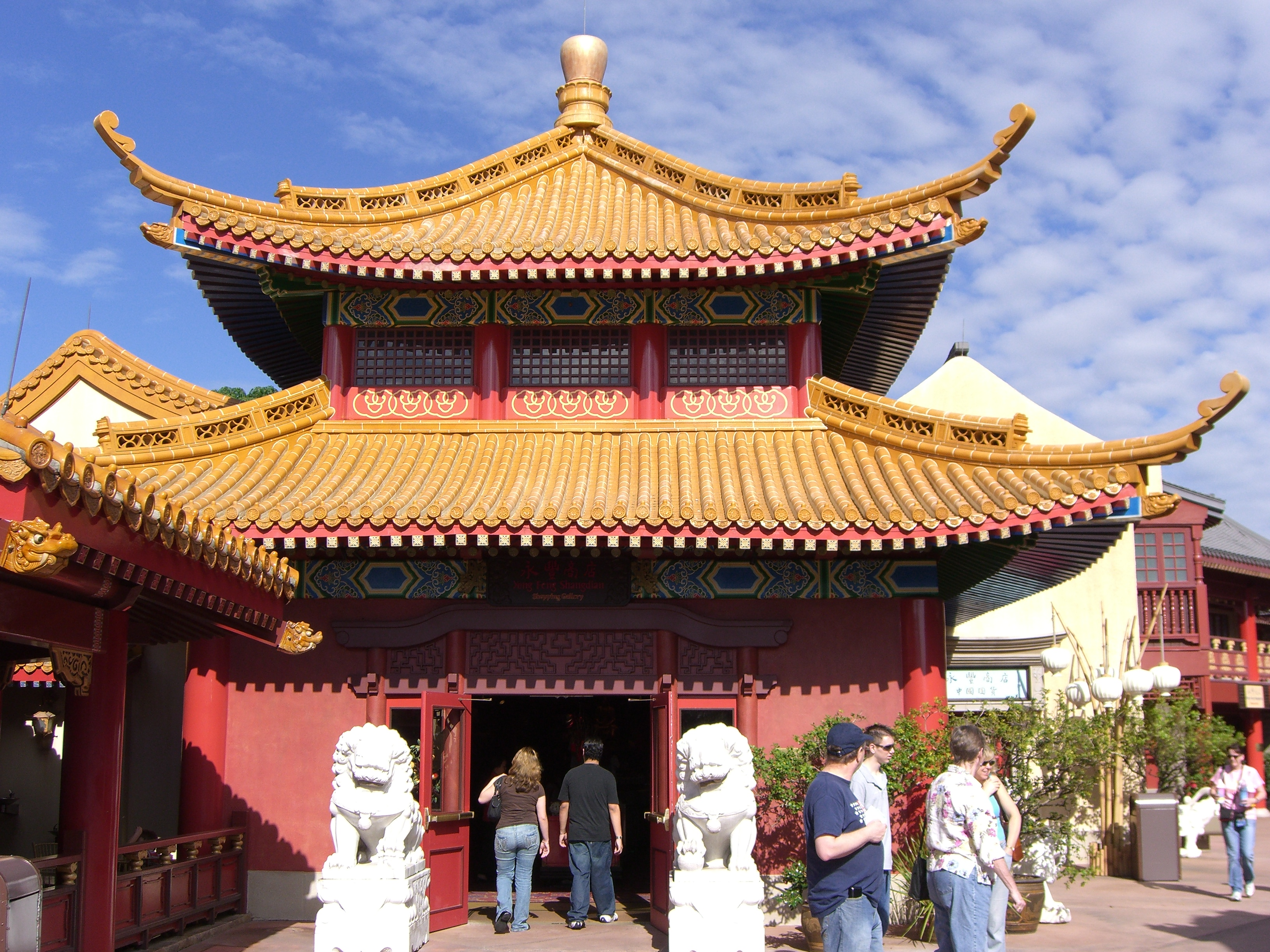
Pagoda with lions in the front

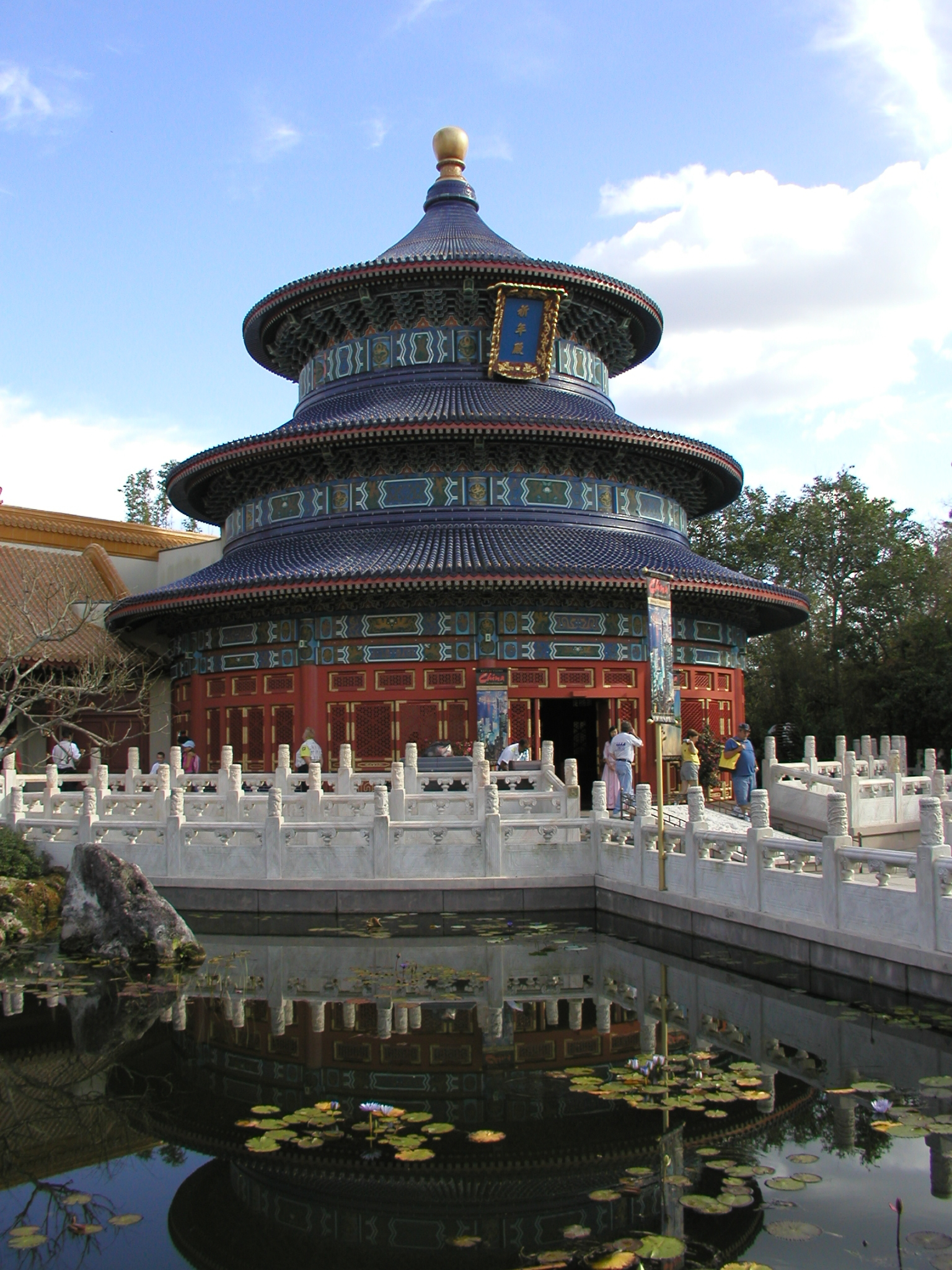
Temple of Heaven

China Pavilion Dome
