= Gil =

Gil or GIL may refer to:

== Places ==
- Gil Island (disambiguation), one of several islands by that name
- Gil, Iran, a village in Hormozgan Province, Iran
- Gilbert Islands, obsolete UNDP country code
- Hil, Azerbaijan, also spelled Gil', a village in Azerbaijan
- Hiloba, also spelled Gil', a village in Azerbaijan
- San Gil, a town in Santander, Colombia

== People ==
- Gil (given name)
- Gil (surname)
- Gil (Korean surname)
- Gil (footballer, born 1950), Brazilian footballer, Gilberto Alves
- Gil (footballer, born June 1987), Brazilian footballer, Carlos Gilberto Nascimento Silva
- Gil (footballer, born September 1987), Brazilian footballer, José Gildeixon Clemente de Paiva
- Gil (footballer, born 1991), Brazilian footballer, Givanilton Martins Ferreira
- José Gildeixon Clemente de Paiva (1987–2016), Brazilian footballer
- Gil Gomes (born 1972), Portuguese retired footballer
- Gilberto Ribeiro Gonçalves (born 1980), Brazilian footballer
- Gilmelândia (born 1975), Brazilian singer known as "Gil"
- Gill (musician) (born 1977), South Korean singer

== Fiction ==
- Gil, a non-canon Star Trek Cardassian military rank
- Gil, the currency used in the Final Fantasy games
- Gil Yepes, the main antagonist of the 2011 French adult animated sci-fi psychological thriller film The Prodigies

== Politics ==
- Gil (political party) (Pensioners of Israel to the Knesset, Gimla'ey Yisrael LaKnesset), a former Israeli political party later known as Dor
- Independent Liberal Group (Grupo Independiente Liberal in Spanish), a former Spanish political party
- Gioventù Italiana del Littorio (Italian Youth of the Lictor), youth movement of the National Fascist Party of Italy
- Initiative and Liberty Groups, the initial name for the Initiative and Liberty Movement, a French Gaullist political association

== Transport ==
- Gilgit Airport, IATA code
- Gillingham railway station (Dorset), Dorset, England, National Rail station code

== Other uses ==
- List of storms named Gil, several tropical cyclones with this name, primarily in the eastern Pacific Ocean
- Gilbertese language, ISO 639 code
- Generic Image Library, a generic programming library for image processing by Adobe Systems
- Global interpreter lock, in interpreter programs
- Gil (comic strip)

== See also ==
- Gill (disambiguation)
- Gilbert (disambiguation)
- Gilberto
