= Gill (disambiguation) =

A gill is an aquatic respiratory organ.

Gill or Gills may also refer to:

== Place names ==
=== United Kingdom ===
- Gill (ravine), generic term for a narrow valley in Northern England and parts of Scotland
- Gills, Caithness, a township
- The Gill, a nature reserve in Kent

=== United States ===
- Gill, Colorado, an unincorporated community
- Gill, Massachusetts, a town
- Gill, South Dakota, a ghost town
- Gill, Texas, an unincorporated community
- Gill, West Virginia, an unincorporated community and former railroad town
- Gills, Virginia, an unincorporated community
- Gill Township, Sullivan County, Indiana
- Gill Township, Clay County, Kansas

=== Elsewhere ===
- Gill (lunar crater), the Moon
- Gill (Martian crater), Mars
- Gill, Ludhiana, India

== People ==
- Gill (name), a given name or surname

== Arts and entertainment ==
=== Fictional characters and elements ===
- Gill (Kim Possible), a character in the Kim Possible animated series
- Gill (Street Fighter), a character in the Street Fighter video game series
- Gill, a moorish idol fish character in the Finding Nemo franchise

=== Other arts and entertainment ===
- Gill, a webcomic by Norm Feuti
- The Gills, an indie rock/post-rock band featured on Guitar Hero Live with "Rubberband"

== Other uses ==
- Gill (unit), a unit of volume
- Gill (automobile), a British microcar
- Gill (publisher), Irish publisher established in 1856 based in Park West, Dublin
- Gill (spinning), a machine for heckling flax
- Gill Industries Television, American cable television company
- Gill, a vector-image program, a fork of which became Sodipodi
- Glechoma hederacea, ground ivy, or an ale made with it
- Lamella (mycology) or gill, a papery rib under a mushroom cap
- The Gills, nickname of Gillingham Football Club in England
- Gill, shorthand for Gill v. Whitford (2018), a U.S. Supreme Court case re Wisconsin gerrymandering

== See also ==
- Gil (disambiguation)
- Jil, Armenia
