= Finding Nemo (franchise) =

Film series and media franchise

- Finding Nemo logo; its sequel Finding Dory uses a similar logo
- Created by: Andrew Stanton
- Developed by: Andrew Stanton Bob Peterson David Reynolds
- Original work: Finding Nemo (2003)
- Owner: Pixar (The Walt Disney Company)
- Years: 2003–present

Print publications
- Magazine: Finding Dory (2016)

Films and television
- Films: Finding Nemo (2003); Finding Dory (2016)
- Short films: Exploring the Reef with Jean-Michel Cousteau (2003); Marine Life Interviews (2016); Dory Finding (2021); Field Trip (2024); Loving Dory (2027)

Theatrical presentations
- Musical: Finding Nemo – The Musical (2007)

Games
- Video games: Finding Nemo (2003); Disney Friends (2007)^{*}; Kinect: Disneyland Adventures (2011)^{*}; Disney Infinity series (2013)^{*}; Rush: A Disney–Pixar Adventure (2017)^{*}^{†}

Audio
- Soundtracks: Finding Nemo (2003); Finding Dory (2016)

Miscellaneous
- Theme park attractions: Turtle Talk with Crush (2004–present); The Seas with Nemo & Friends (2007–present)^{‡}; Finding Nemo – The Musical (2007–present); Crush's Coaster (2007–present); Finding Nemo Submarine Voyage (2007–present)
- ^{*} Work where this franchise's characters or settings appeared as part of a crossover.; ^{†} A remastered re-release of Kinect Rush: A Disney•Pixar Adventure (2012); Finding Dory was added to the re-release.; ^{‡} Pavilion opened in 1986 as The Living Seas.

Finding Nemo (Note: sometimes referred to as simply Finding) is an American animated film series media franchise that started in 2003 with the release of the animated film Finding Nemo, produced by Pixar Animation Studios and released by Walt Disney Pictures. The original film was followed by a standalone sequel, Finding Dory, released in 2016. Both films were directed by Andrew Stanton. The film series received widespread critical acclaim from critics and audiences with two films released to-date, the series has grossed $1.9 billion worldwide.

== Film series ==
Film	Release date	Director	Screenplay by	Story by	Produced by
Finding Nemo	May 30, 2003	Andrew Stanton	Andrew Stanton, Bob Peterson & David Reynolds	Andrew Stanton	Graham Walters
Finding Dory	June 17, 2016	Andrew Stanton	Andrew Stanton & Victoria Strouse	Andrew Stanton	Lindsey Collins

=== Finding Nemo (2003) ===
Finding Nemo is the fifth Pixar film. The film tells the story of a clownfish named Nemo (voiced by Alexander Gould), who gets abducted from his home in the Great Barrier Reef and winds up in a dentist's office aquarium. His overprotective father Marlin (voiced by Albert Brooks), along with an amnesiac regal tang named Dory (voiced by Ellen DeGeneres), searches for him all the way to Sydney Harbour. Along the way, Marlin learns to take risks and let little Nemo take care of himself.

=== Finding Dory (2016) ===
Finding Dory is the seventeenth Pixar film. The film focuses on the amnesiac character Dory (voiced by Ellen DeGeneres), who travels to California to find her long-lost parents, Jenny and Charlie, as well as exploring the idea of her being reunited with her family. It takes place one year after Finding Nemo and is set off the coast of Morro Bay, California.

=== Future ===
Director Andrew Stanton commented in June 2016 about the possibility of a third Finding film, stating:

"I really do feel like that this was the missing piece, emotionally, for the first movie. Now, I've stopped saying never for anything because there are a lot of new characters that get introduced and we've broadened the universe for this movie. And again, I'm very used to seeing that world continue to open up from the Toy Story movies, so I've learned to just say, to my knowledge, I think everything that was born of the first movie is wrapped up. But we'll see. With any of the other sequels, we strive to try and make it seem like it was inevitable, like it was meant to be, that all these extended stories and journeys with these characters were part of the whole canon. And that's really hard, but it's so satisfying for me when I'm experiencing that, whether it's a great second season of a TV show or another book in a series. It's a small club when it's done successfully. Regardless of how much people may vocalize that they don't enjoy or wish that there weren't extensions, sometimes it's really nice to go back and spend more time with these characters if they evolve, if they grow, if they expand. So that, I'm very happy with. I feel like it was just as hard, if not harder, on Finding Dory to get it to feel inevitable and preordained, and that it was always of the larger piece."

In May 2024, Pixar CCO Pete Docter suggested that the studio was considering making a third installment in the Finding Nemo franchise. He stated "Where else have we not gone in the ocean? The ocean's a big place. I think there's a lot of opportunity there. We're kind of fishing around." In July 2024, while in the middle of her final tour entitled "Ellen's Last Stand...Up", DeGeneres answered in a Q&A session that her Netflix special later that year would be her last act in show business. When asked if she would reprise the role of Dory again, DeGeneres responded "No, I'm going bye-bye, remember."

On April 25, 2026, Pixar announced that a new Finding Nemo short film is in development with Ellen DeGeneres coming out of retirement to reprise her role as Dory.

== Short films ==
- Exploring the Reef with Jean-Michel Cousteau (2003): A short documentary film. It features Jean-Michel Cousteau, exploring the Great Barrier Reef, but Marlin, Dory, and Nemo keep interrupting him. The short film is included on the Finding Nemo DVD.
- Marine Life Interviews (2016): A short film focusing on some of the supporting characters within Dory as they give brief interviews and thoughts on Dory herself. This is similar to the character interviews for Finding Nemo.
- Dory Finding (2021): Dory Finding shows Dory finding items from the surface in the coral reef. This short is part of the Pixar Popcorn series on Disney+.
- Field Trip (2024): This short is part of the Lego Pixar BrickToons series on Disney+.
- Loving Dory (2027): A theatrical short film where Dory enjoys an unexpected alliance with a plastic bag floating through the sea.

== Reception ==
=== Box office performance ===
Finding Nemo is the second highest-grossing film of 2003, behind The Lord of the Rings: The Return of the King. It was the highest-grossing Pixar film, up until 2010 when Toy Story 3 surpassed it. Finding Dory is the third-highest-grossing film of 2016, behind Civil War and Rogue One.

Finding Nemo is the 13th highest-grossing animated franchise.

Film	Release date	Revenue			Rank		Budget
Film	Release date	United States	Other territories	Worldwide	All-time domestic	All-time worldwide	Budget
Finding Nemo	May 30, 2003	$380,843,261	$559,492,275	$940,335,536	#26 #55 (A)	#36	$99,000,000
Original release	May 30, 2003	$339,714,978	$531,304,279	$871,019,257			$94,000,000
3-D re-release	September 14, 2012	$41,128,283	$28,187,996	$69,316,279			$5,000,000
Finding Dory	June 17, 2016	$486,295,561	$541,068,765	$1,027,364,326	#7 #71 (A)	#22	$200,000,000
Total		$867,138,822	$1,100,561,040	$1,967,699,862			$299,000,000
List indicator^{(A)} indicates the adjusted totals based on current ticket prices (calculated by Box Office Mojo).

=== Critical and public response ===
Film	Critical		Public
Film	Rotten Tomatoes	Metacritic	CinemaScore
Finding Nemo	99% (266 reviews)	90 (38 reviews)	A+
Finding Dory	94% (340 reviews)	77 (48 reviews)	A

== Accolades ==
Both films received universal acclaim, with the first film winning the Academy Award for Best Animated Feature. It was a financial blockbuster as it grossed over $921 million worldwide. It is the best-selling DVD of all time, with over 40 million copies sold as of 2006 and is the second highest grossing G-rated movie of all time. In 2008, the American Film Institute named it the 10th greatest American Animated film ever made during their 10 Top 10. It also won the award for best Animated Film at the Kansas City Film Critics Circle Awards, the Las Vegas Film Critics Society Awards, the National Board of Review Awards, the Online Film Critics Society Awards, and the Toronto Film Critics Association Awards.

== Cast and characters ==
List indicators

This section includes characters who will appear or have appeared in the franchise.

- An empty grey cell indicates the character was not in the film, or that the character's official presence has not yet been confirmed.
- ^{Y} indicates a younger version of the character.

Characters	Feature films		Short films			
Characters	Finding Nemo	Finding Dory	Exploring the Reef with Jean-Michel Cousteau	Marine Life Interviews	Pixar Popcorn	Lego Pixar: Bricktoons
Nemo	Alexander Gould	Hayden Rolence	Alexander Gould			Pressly James Crosby
Marlin	Albert Brooks	Albert Brooks	Albert Brooks			Jess Harnell
Dory	Ellen DeGeneres	Ellen DeGeneres Sloane Murray^{Y} Lucia Geddes^{Y}	Ellen DeGeneres	Ellen DeGeneres	Ellen DeGeneres	Jennifer Hale
Gill	Willem Dafoe	Willem Dafoe				
Bloat	Brad Garrett	Brad Garrett				
Peach	Allison Janney	Allison Janney				
Gurgle	Austin Pendleton	Austin Pendleton				
Bubbles	Stephen Root	Stephen Root				
Deb	Vicki Lewis	Vicki Lewis				
Jacques	Joe Ranft	Jerome Ranft				
Crush	Andrew Stanton	Andrew Stanton				
Squirt	Nicholas Bird	Bennett Dammann				Lincoln Peters
Mr. Ray	Bob Peterson	Bob Peterson				Bob Peterson
Bruce	Barry Humphries	Deleted scene				
Darla Sherman	LuLu Ebeling	Photograph				
Tad	Jordy Ranft	Characters are mute				
Sheldon	Erik Per Sullivan	Characters are mute				Henry Witcher
Pearl	Erica Beck	Characters are mute				
Anchor	Eric Bana					
Chum	Bruce Spence					
Philip Sherman	Bill Hunter	Photograph				
Nigel	Geoffrey Rush					
Coral	Elizabeth Perkins					
Blenny	Bob Bergen				Silent cameo	
School of Moonfish	John Ratzenberger					
Chicken Fish	Katherine Ringgold	Katherine Ringgold				
Hank		Ed O'Neill		Ed O'Neill		
Destiny		Kaitlin Olson		Kaitlin Olson		
Bailey		Ty Burrell		Ty Burrell		
Jenny		Diane Keaton				
Charlie		Eugene Levy				
Fluke		Idris Elba		Idris Elba		
Rudder		Dominic West		Dominic West		
Stan		Bill Hader				
Inez		Kate McKinnon				
Gerald		Torbin Xan Bullock				
Becky		Torbin Xan Bullock				
Bill		John Ratzenberger				
Jean-Michel Cousteau			Himself			

- Note: A grey cell indicates that the character didn't appear in the film.

== Theme park attractions ==
- Crush's Coaster at Walt Disney Studios Park at Disneyland Paris.
- Finding Nemo Submarine Voyage at Disneyland at Disneyland Resort.
- Finding Nemo – The Musical at Disney's Animal Kingdom at Walt Disney World.
- The Seas with Nemo & Friends at Epcot at Walt Disney World.
- Turtle Talk with Crush at Epcot at Walt Disney World, Disney California Adventure at Disneyland Resort and Tokyo DisneySea at Tokyo Disney Resort.
- Nemo & Friends SeaRider at Tokyo DisneySea at Tokyo Disney Resort.

== Other media ==
=== Video games ===
==== Finding Nemo ====
Finding Nemo was released in 2003 by THQ. The goal in the game is to complete different levels under the roles of film protagonists Nemo, Marlin or Dory. It includes cutscenes from the movie and each clip is based on a level. For example, Marlin and Dory hopping through a batch of jellyfish.

The game received mixed reviews. It received 2/5 stars on GameSpy, 6.2/10 points on GameSpot and IGN gave it 7.0/10 and 6.0/10 on its PS2 and Xbox, and GameCube platforms, respectively.

==== Disney Friends ====
In 2007, Disney Interactive Studios released Disney Friends. It is a video game based on various Disney films. The game features characters Stitch from Lilo & Stitch, Dory from Finding Nemo, Pooh from Winnie the Pooh, and Simba from The Lion King.

==== Kinect: Disneyland Adventures ====
Kinect: Disneyland Adventures is a video game released in 2011 by Frontier Developments. The game is based in various Disneyland attractions. It was released on Kinect for Xbox 360. Characters from Finding Nemo appear as part of a minigame based on Finding Nemo Submarine Voyage.

==== Nemo's Reef ====
Nemo's Reef was a mobile game available from December 20, 2012 to June 30, 2017 by Disney Mobile. The game is a casual reef building which features characters from Finding Nemo. It was released on Android and iOS devices.

==== Disney Infinity ====
Disney Infinity was a video game series developed by Avalanche Software that ran from 2013 to 2016. Elements from Finding Nemo appeared throughout all three games in the series, with power discs based on the film released for the first game, and a playset based on Finding Dory along with Dory and Nemo figures released for the console versions of Disney Infinity 3.0 in June 2016. The aforementioned playset and figures were the last new content released for the series, which was cancelled by Disney in May 2016.

==== Rush: A Disney•Pixar Adventure ====
Kinect Rush: A Disney•Pixar Adventure is a video game developed by Asobo Studio originally released in 2012 for Xbox 360. On October 31, 2017, a remastered release without the Kinect branding titled Rush: A Disney•Pixar Adventure was released for Xbox One and Microsoft Windows 10. The remastered version adds a world based on Finding Dory alongside the original release's worlds.

==== Disney Magic Kingdoms ====
During a limited time Event focused on the franchise, under the name "Finding Marlin", the world builder game Disney Magic Kingdoms included Nemo, Marlin, Dory, Crush, Squirt, Bruce and Hank as playable characters, along with the attractions Crush's Coaster, Finding Nemo Submarine Voyage, and The Seas with Nemo and Friends. Bailey and Destiny were also included as playable characters in a later update of the game. In the game the characters are involved in new storylines that serve as a continuation of the events in the films.

=== Stage musical ===
Finding Nemo – The Musical is a 40-minute show (performed five times daily), which opened on January 24, 2007 at the Theater in the Wild at Disney's Animal Kingdom in Orlando, Florida. It is a musical adaption of the film with new songs written by Tony Award-winning Avenue Q composer Robert Lopez and his wife, Kristen Anderson-Lopez. It would "combine puppets, dancers, acrobats and animated backdrops".

=== Appearance on Fetch! with Ruff Ruffman ===
In the PBS Kids program Fetch! with Ruff Ruffman, Crush the sea turtle appeared as a guest star in the Season 5 episode, "The Ol' Shell Game", voiced again by Andrew Stanton.

=== Magazine ===
In August 2016, Egmont Publishing launched a magazine, titled Finding Dory.

=== Music ===
Finding Nemo is the soundtrack album of the film of the same name. Finding Dory is the soundtrack album of the film of the same name. The soundtracks were scored by Thomas Newman.

The score was nominated for the 76th Academy Awards for Best Original Score but lost against The Lord of the Rings: The Return of the King. It received 5/5 stars from the Film Score Reviews and 3.5/5 stars from Soundtrack.net.

== Crew ==
Film	Director(s)	Writer(s)	Producer(s)	Executive Producer	Composer	Editor(s)
Finding Nemo	Andrew Stanton; Co-directed by: Lee Unkrich	Original Story by: Andrew Stanton; Screenplay by: Andrew Stanton, Bob Peterson and David Reynolds	Graham Walters	John Lasseter	Thomas Newman	David Ian Salter
Finding Dory	Andrew Stanton; Co-directed by: Angus MacLane	Original Story by: Andrew Stanton; Screenplay by: Andrew Stanton and Victoria Strouse	Lindsey Collins	John Lasseter	Thomas Newman	Axel Geddes
