= Guru Nanak Dev Engineering College, Ludhiana =

Autonomous college in Ludhiana, Punjab

Guru Nanak Dev Engineering College
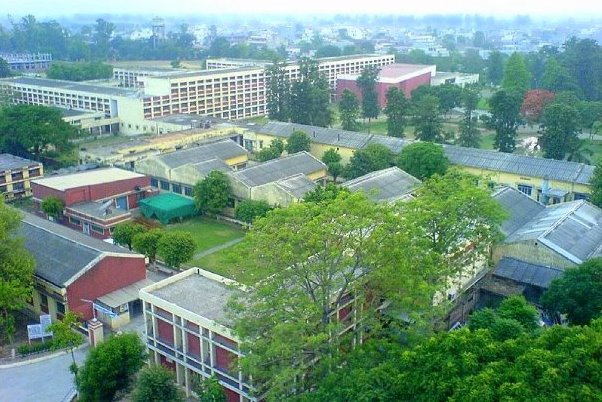
- Motto in English: Contemplate and reflect upon knowledge, and you will become a benefactor to others.
- Type: Govt. Aided
- Established: April 8, 1956; 70 years ago
- Parent institution: Nankana Sahib Education Trust
- Academic affiliations: IKGPTU (earlier Panjab University), Autonomous College under UGC-1956 Act 2(f) & 12(B), NAAC A Grade, IEI
- Principal: Dr. Sehijpal Singh
- Location: Ludhiana, Punjab, India; 30°51′41″N 75°51′43″E
- Campus: Urban, 88 acres (35.6 ha)
- Nickname: GNE
- Website: www.gndec.ac.in

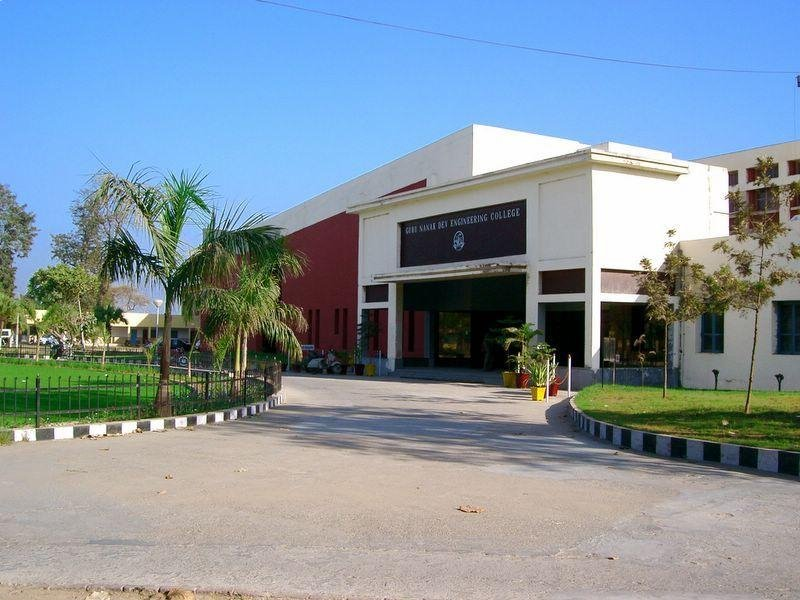
Admin block

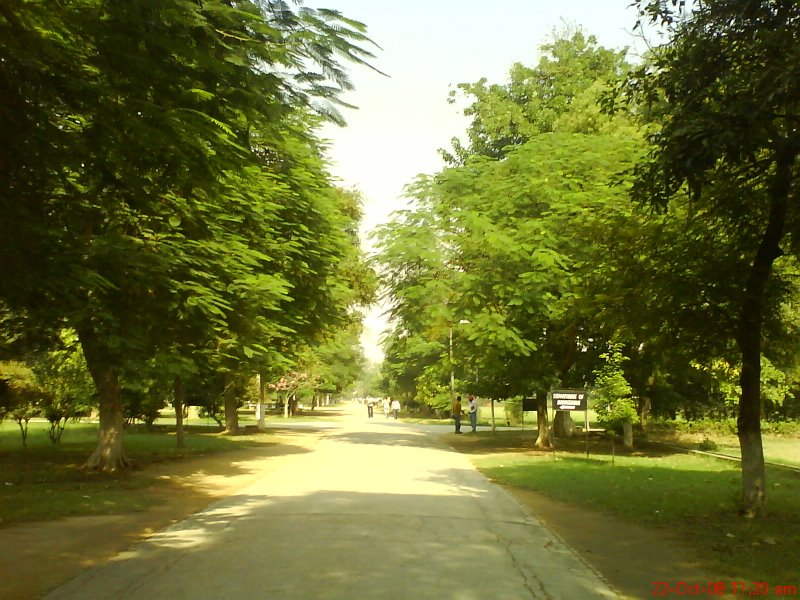
Green GNDEC campus

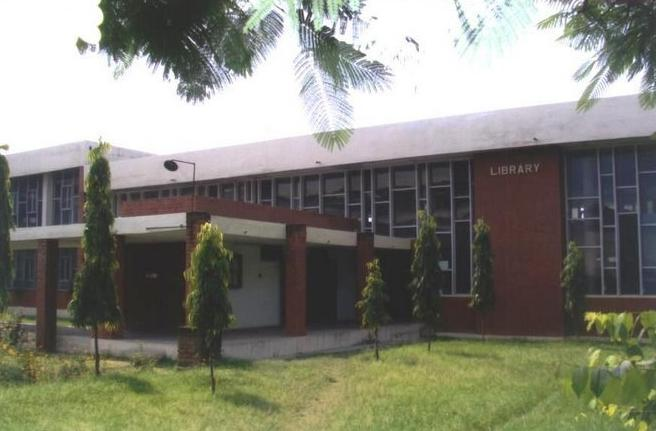
Central Library

Guru Nanak Dev Engineering College (GNDEC or GNE Ludhiana) is one of the oldest engineering institutions of the northern region situated at Gill Park, Ludhiana, Punjab, India. The foundation stone of the college was laid on 8 April 1956 by Hon'ble Dr. Rajendra Prasad, the first President of India. The college has been named after 1st Sikh Guru Guru Nanak Dev Ji.

== Campus ==
College campus is spread over 86 acres (35 ha) about 5 km (3.1 mi) from bus stand and 8 km (5.0 mi) from Ludhiana Railway Station on Ludhiana–Malerkotla Road. Campus has various amenities such as college building, auditorium, girls and boys hostels, swimming pool, sports and gymnasium hall complex, Gurudwara Sahib, bank branch, dispensary, post office and open air theatre.

=== Central facilities ===
- Central library
- Mechanical workshop block
- Computer center
- Genco alumni home
- Day scholar club (now replaced by examination branch)

== Academics ==
The college was earlier affiliated with Panjab University, Chandigarh since beginning. But after establishment of Punjab Technical University, Jalandhar in 1997 as a single affiliating university for all technical colleges of Punjab, college became affiliated with I. K. Gujral Punjab Technical University, Jalandhar. GNE is the first Engineering College of Punjab, which was conferred Autonomous Status by University Grants Commission in 2012. The college is one of the few technical institutions of Punjab selected for World Bank financial assistance under Technical Education Quality Improvement Programme (TEQIP).

=== Courses offered ===
- Bachelor of Technology
  - Civil Engineering
  - Electrical Engineering
  - Mechanical Engineering
  - Robotics and Artificial Intelligence
  - Electronics & Communication Engineering
  - Computer Science & Engineering
  - Information Technology
  - Production Engineering
- Master of Technology
  - Computer Science and Engineering
  - Computer Science and Information Technology
  - Industrial Engineering
  - Production Engineering
  - Power Engineering
  - Structural Engineering
  - Geotechnical Engineering
  - Electronics & Communication Engineering
  - Environmental Engineering
- B.Arch
- Bachelor of Business Administration
- Master of Business Administration
- Bachelor of Computer Applications
- Master of Computer Applications
- Ph.D. under QIP

=== Reputation and rankings ===
University and college rankings

Engineering – India
- India Today (2020): 70

GNE was ranked at place 70 among engineering colleges in India by India Today in 2020.

=== Admissions ===
- LEET for diploma holder
- Common Management Admission Test (CMAT) for admissions to postgraduate degree program in Management (MBA)
- Graduate Aptitude Test in Engineering (GATE) as well as through B.Tech merit, as per Punjab Technical University guidelines for admissions in M.Tech

=== Campus placements and industrial interaction ===
The college has received positive press for the number of its students placed in companies, and has tie-ups and signed MoUs with industrial and research institutes. It runs a testing and consultancy cell, providing consultation services.

== Student activities ==
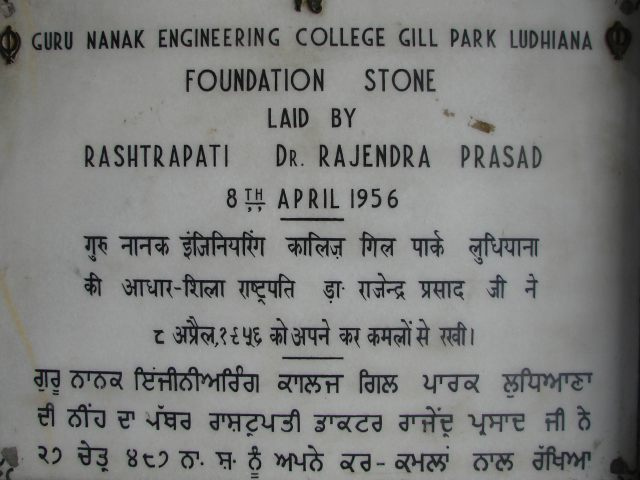
The foundation stone of the college

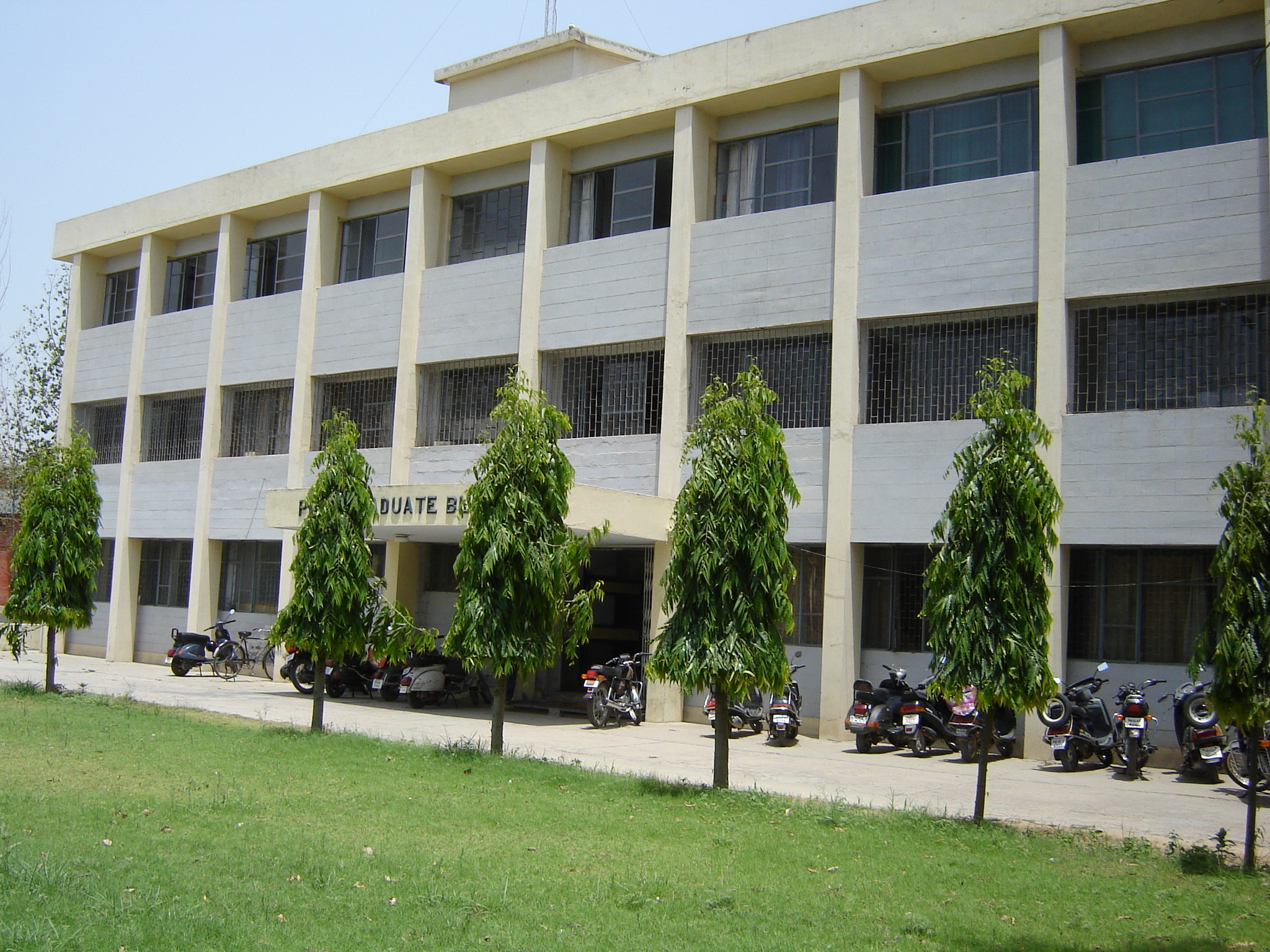
Postgraduate block

=== Festivals ===
- ANAND UTSAV is the annual cultural festival held in March every year
- GENESIS was the annual cultural and arts festival held in February or March
- ATHARVA is the annual Technical festival held in September or October and invites participants from various renowned colleges of North India.

=== Professional societies ===
Chapters of the following professional bodies have been established at the college.

- Association of Civil Engineering Students(ACES)
- Society of Automotive Engineers
- Indian Society for Technical Education
- Coding Ninjas 10X Student Chapter
- Computer Society of India (CSI)
- Linux User Group
- Helps welfare society

=== NSS/NCC ===
An NSS wing and an NCC wing has been established.

=== Community Radio Station ===
The 90.8 MHz FM Community Radio Station of Guru Nanak Dev Engineering College, Ludhiana, is an effort to serve society by broadcasting programs pertinent to education, information, entertainment, recreation, public affairs, culture, career guidance, sports, and more.

== Academic extension ==
- Guru Nanak Dev Polytechnic College, Ludhiana
- Science & Technology Entrepreneurs’ Park (STEP-GNDEC)
- Centre for Development of Rural Technology (CDRT)
- Nankana Sahib Public School, Gill Road, Ludhiana

== Notable people ==
List of Principals
- Tara Singh Randhawa
- Ajmer Singh
- Hari Singh
- Pritpal Singh Grewal
- Randhir Singh Seehra (M-1961)
- Rupinderpal Singh Sukerchakia (M-1967)
- Dilbagh Singh Hira (M-1966)
- Surinder Bir Singh (M-1967)
- Dalvinder Singh Grewal
- Harkirat Kaur Grewal (E-1968)
- H.K.Buttar
- Manohar Singh Saini
- Sehijpal Singh, Present (M-1991)

GNE graduates (Genconians) have found success in a variety of diverse fields including cultural, political, public and private sectors in India and abroad. Various Alumni chapters of college are active around the world. The list contains many people including faculty members and Alumni.

- Sukh Dhaliwal (CE-1983)
- Nazar Singh Manshahia, MLA (Mansa), Aam Aadmi Party (CE-1982)
- Sidhu Moose Wala alias Shubdeep Singh Sidhu (EE-2016)
- Gurpartap Singh Wadala (EE-1985)
- Baldev Singh Sra, CMD, PSPCL (EE-1982)
- Sukhpal Singh Gill, Queen Mary University of London, UK (CS-2010)

== See also ==
- List of places named after Guru Nanak Dev
- Centre of Excellence for Farm Machinery (erstwhile MERADO)
- Punjab Engineering College, Chandigarh
- Birla Institute of Technology – Science and Technology Entrepreneurs' Park
- Village Gill
