= American Waterfront (Tokyo DisneySea) =

Themed land

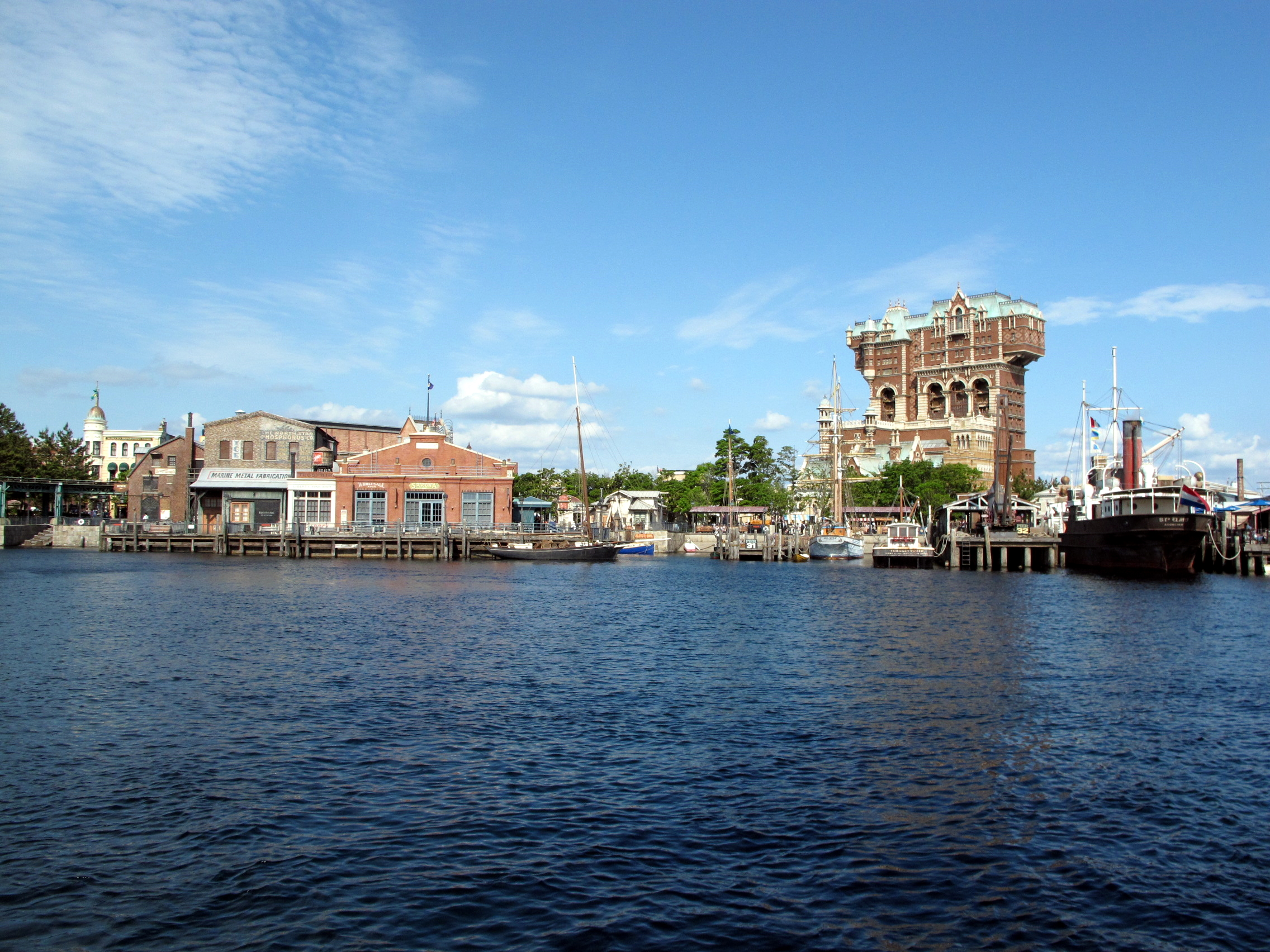
- American Waterfront 1910
- Interactive map of American Waterfront
- Theme: New York City and New England in the 19th Century to early 20th Century

Attractions
- Total: 10
- Other rides: 6
- Shows: 3

Tokyo DisneySea
- Coordinates: 35°37′27″N 139°53′14″E
- Status: Operating
- Opened: September 4, 2001

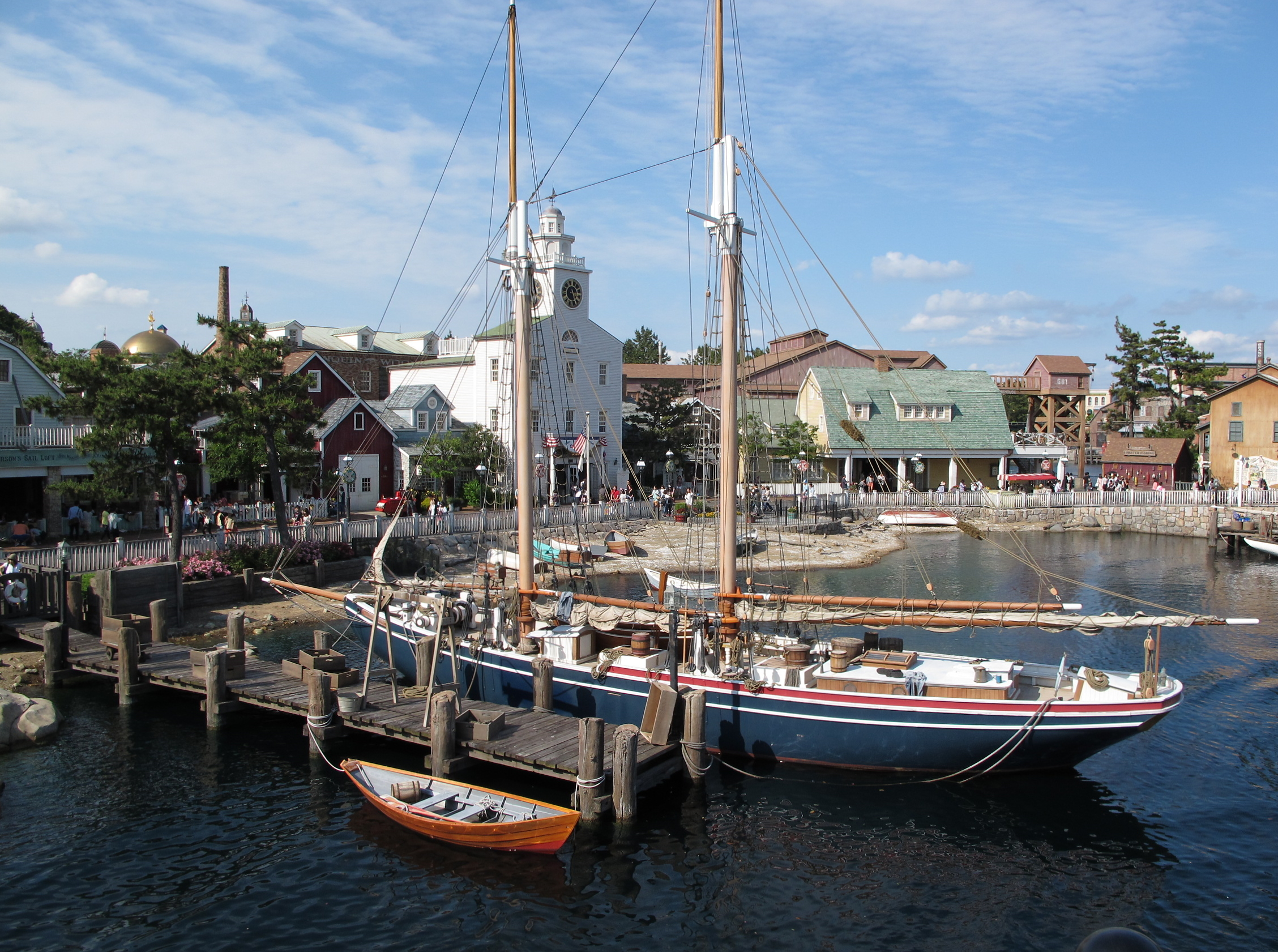
The American Waterfront is themed to resemble the New England fishing village of Cape Cod

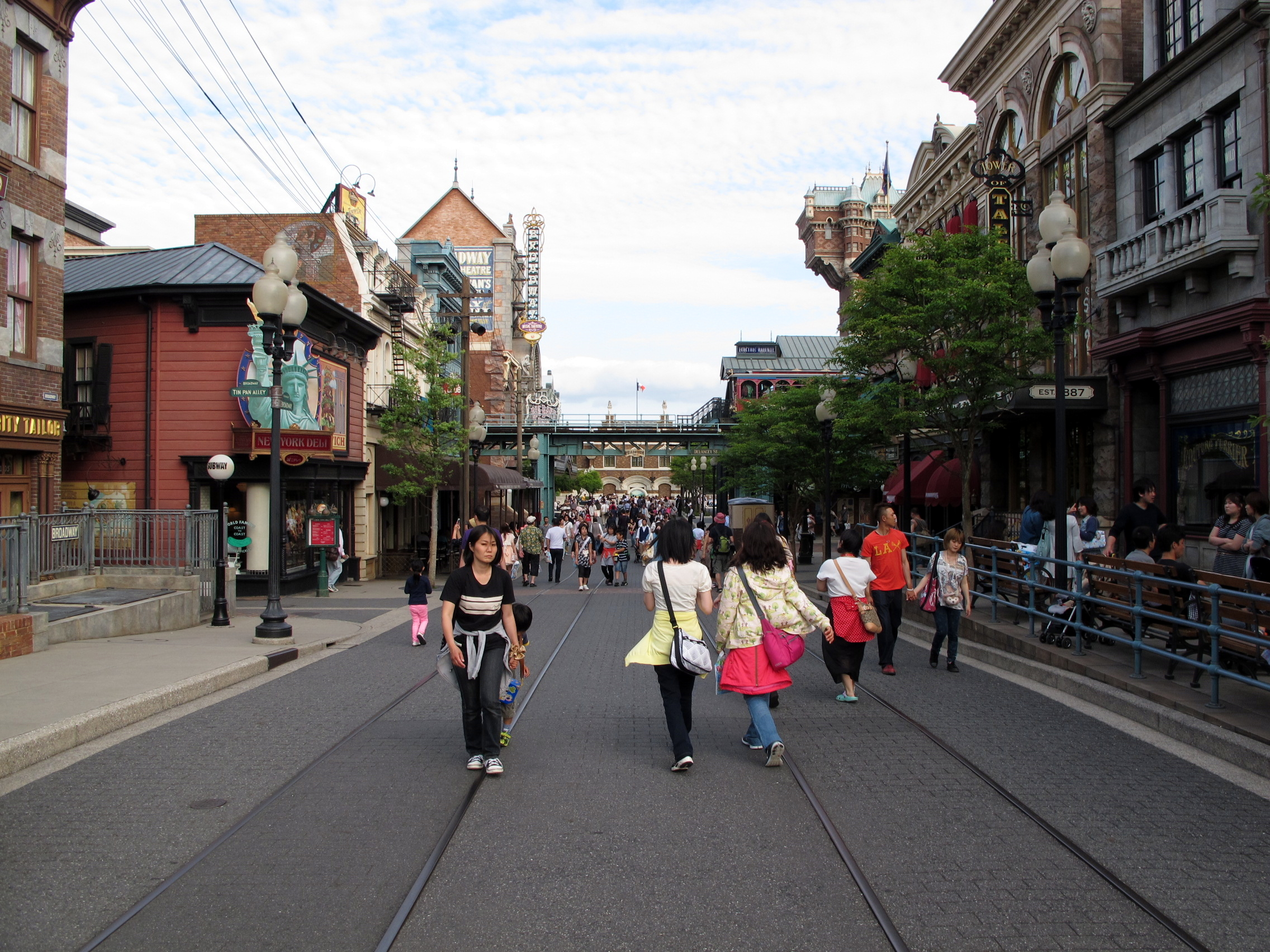
The American Waterfront area resembles a street in New York City

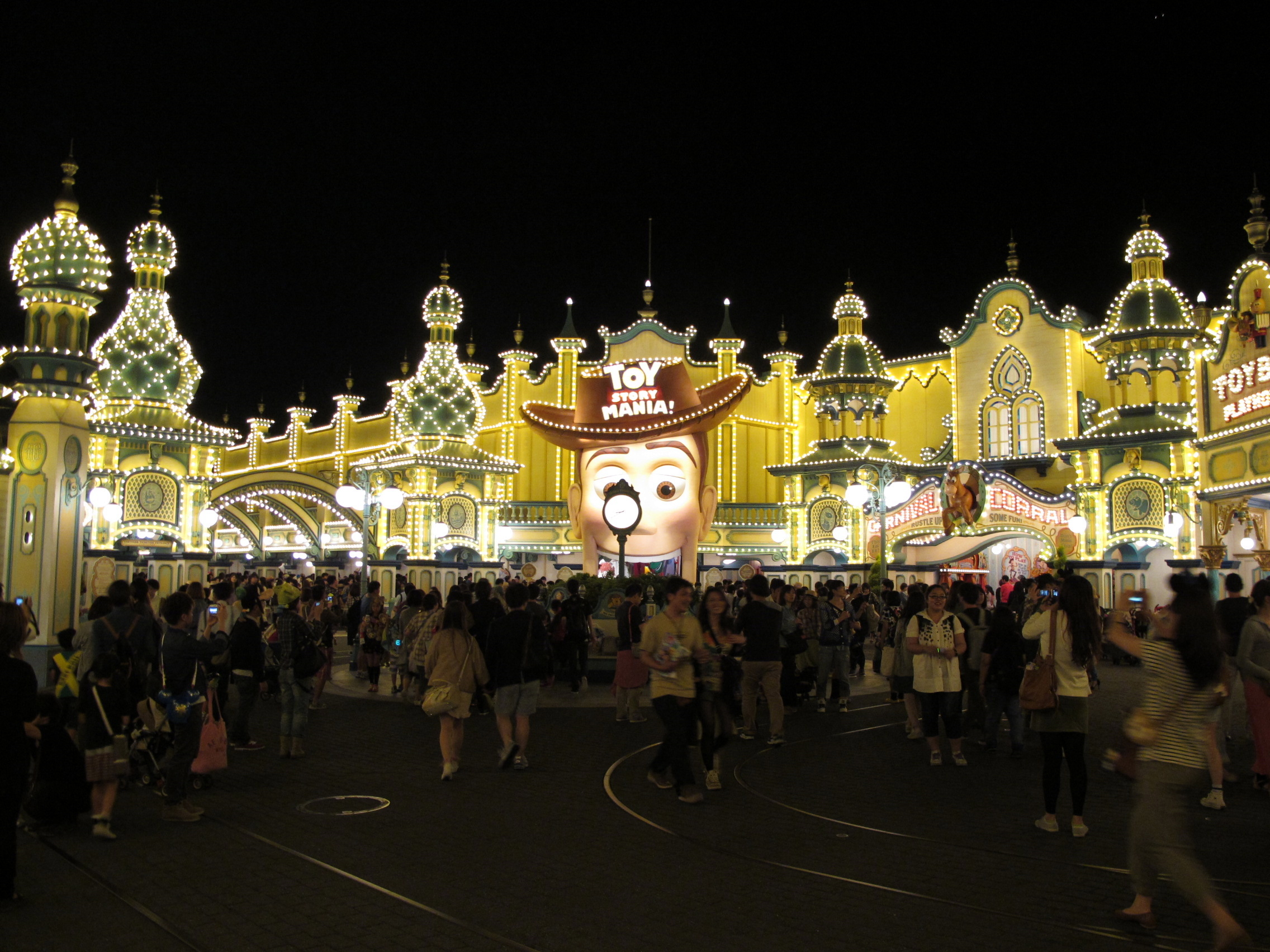
Toy Story Mania is one of the most popular attractions in DisneySea

American Waterfront is a "port-of-call" (themed land) at Tokyo DisneySea in the Tokyo Disney Resort. It represents the Northeastern seaboard of the United States in the early 20th century, and features two themed areas, an Old Cape Cod section, and a New York Harbor section with an elaborate backstory.

== Theming ==
The American Waterfront is themed to resemble a New York City enlivened by new immigrants, and the New England fishing community of Cape Cod.

New York City is depicted as a bustling city during the 1910s, complete with an elevated railway, a classic American Theater and a harbor displaying a large range of boats, including the massive S.S. Columbia. This city's backstory revolves around the wealthy Harrison Hightower III, whose power grew stronger amid New York, as one can guess seeing his Hightower Hotel, symbol of his might until he mysteriously disappeared after retrieving a cursed African idol. His business rival Cornelius Endicott, owner of the S.S. Columbia ocean liner and a vast shipping empire has since picked up much of the slack, though his effort to tear down Hotel Hightower was blocked by his own daughter Beatrice. The Cape Cod area of American Waterfront is home to Disney's Duffy the Disney Bear character and his friends.

== Attractions ==
- Big City Vehicles
- DisneySea Electric Railway
  - American Waterfront Station
- DisneySea Transit Steamer Line
- Tower of Terror - Similar to the Disney's Hollywood Studios, Walt Disney Studios Park and formerly Disney California Adventure versions of the attraction. Inside the Hotel Hightower, guests unravel the story and fright behind the disappearance of Harrison Hightower III after bringing in a cursed African idol named "Shiriki Utundu."
- Turtle Talk - Inside the S.S. Columbia, where guests meet Crush, from the Disney and Pixar movie Finding Nemo, as they look through an underwater window.
- Toy Story Mania! - The popular ride from Disney California Adventure and Disney's Hollywood Studios, based on the Toy Story movies, located within the Toyville Trolley Park sub-area.

== Entertainment ==
=== Current ===
- Transit Steamer Greeting (2020–present)
- Dockside Stage
  - Jamboree Mickey! Let's Dance! (2019–present)

=== Upcoming ===
- Broadway Music Theatre:
  - Bring the Rhythm! (Opening in Fall 2027)

=== Past ===
- Cape Cod Cook-Off
  - Donald's Boat Builders (2001-2010)
  - Cape Cod Step Out (2006-2007, 2009)
  - My Friend Duffy (2010-2020)
- Dockside Stage
  - Sail Away (2001-2006)
  - Rhythms of the World (2004-2005, 2006)
  - Mickey's Dream Company (2009; seasonals)
  - Over the Waves (2006-2010)
  - A Table is Waiting (2008, 2011-2017)
  - Steps to Shine (2017-2018)
  - Hello, New York! (2018-2020)
- Broadway Music Theatre:
  - Encore! (2001-2006)
  - Big Band Beat (2006-2020)
  - Big Band Beat: A Special Treat (2021-2025)

== Seasonal ==
=== Dazzling Christmas in New York ===
- Christmas Carolers - a group of 5 Victorian, Holiday singers who performs acapella harmonies of guests' favorite classic Holiday music.
- Holiday Wonder Band - a group of 5 vintage, Holiday musicians who performs guests' favorite classic Holiday music on 4 horns and a drum set.
- Holly Jolly Trio - a group of 3 Victorian, Holiday musicians who wonders around the New York area of American Waterfront and senarades guests with Holiday cheer. This group performs guests' favorite classic Holiday music on 2 clarinets and an accordion.

== Restaurants and refreshments ==
- S.S. Columbia Dining Room
- The Teddy Roosevelt Lounge
- Restaurant Sakura
- New York Deli
- Liberty Landing Diner
- Barnacle Bill's
- Papadakis Fresh Fruit
- High Tide Treats
- Delancey Catering
- Cape Cod Cook-Off

== Shopping ==
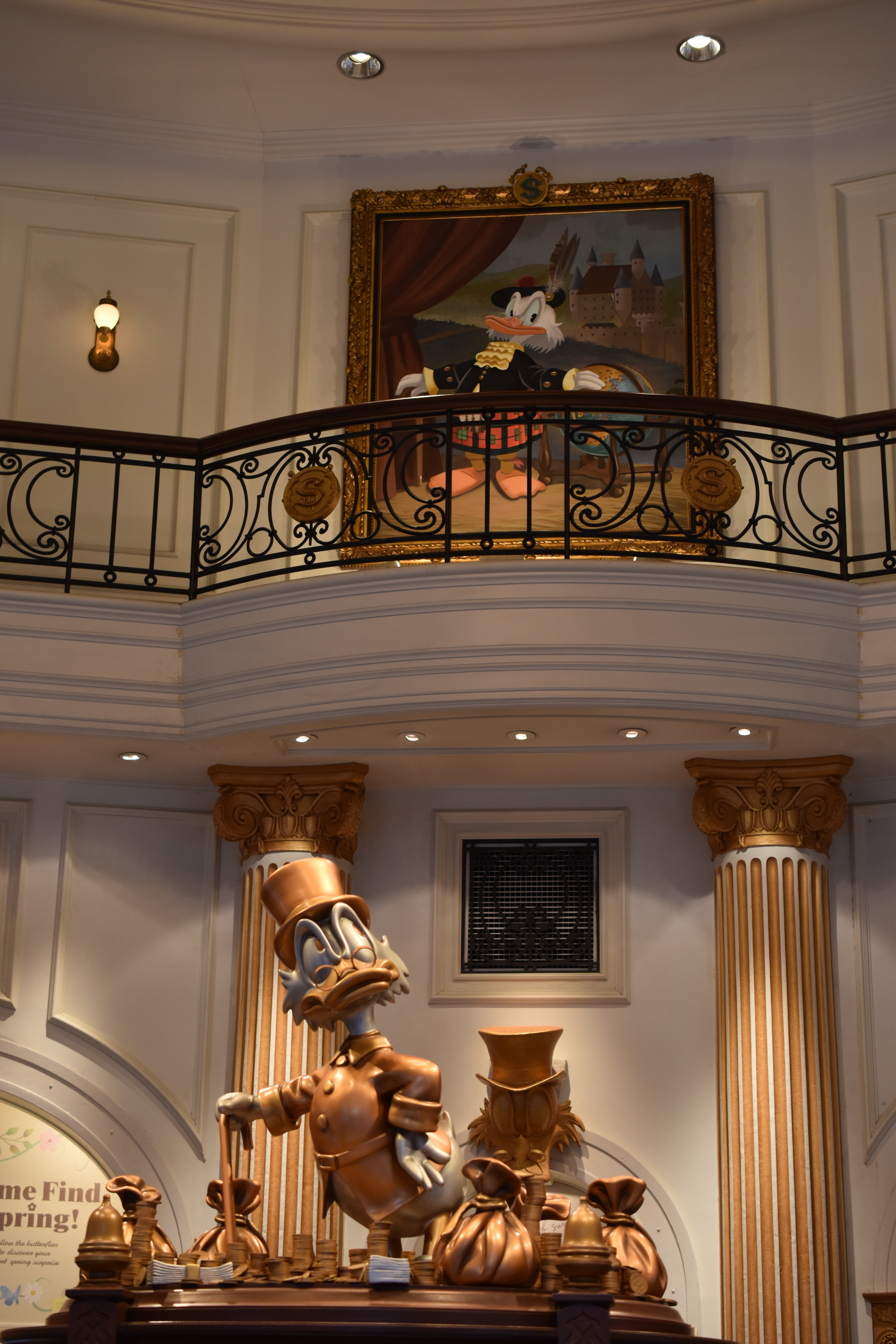
McDuck's Department Store

- McDuck's Department Store
- Tower of Terror Memorabilia
- Steamboat Mickey's
- Aunt Peg's Village Store
- Newsie's Newsstand
- Slinky Dog's Gift Trolley

== See also ==
- Main Street, U.S.A.
