= Coral Reef Restaurant =

Restaurant at the Walt Disney World Resort in Florida

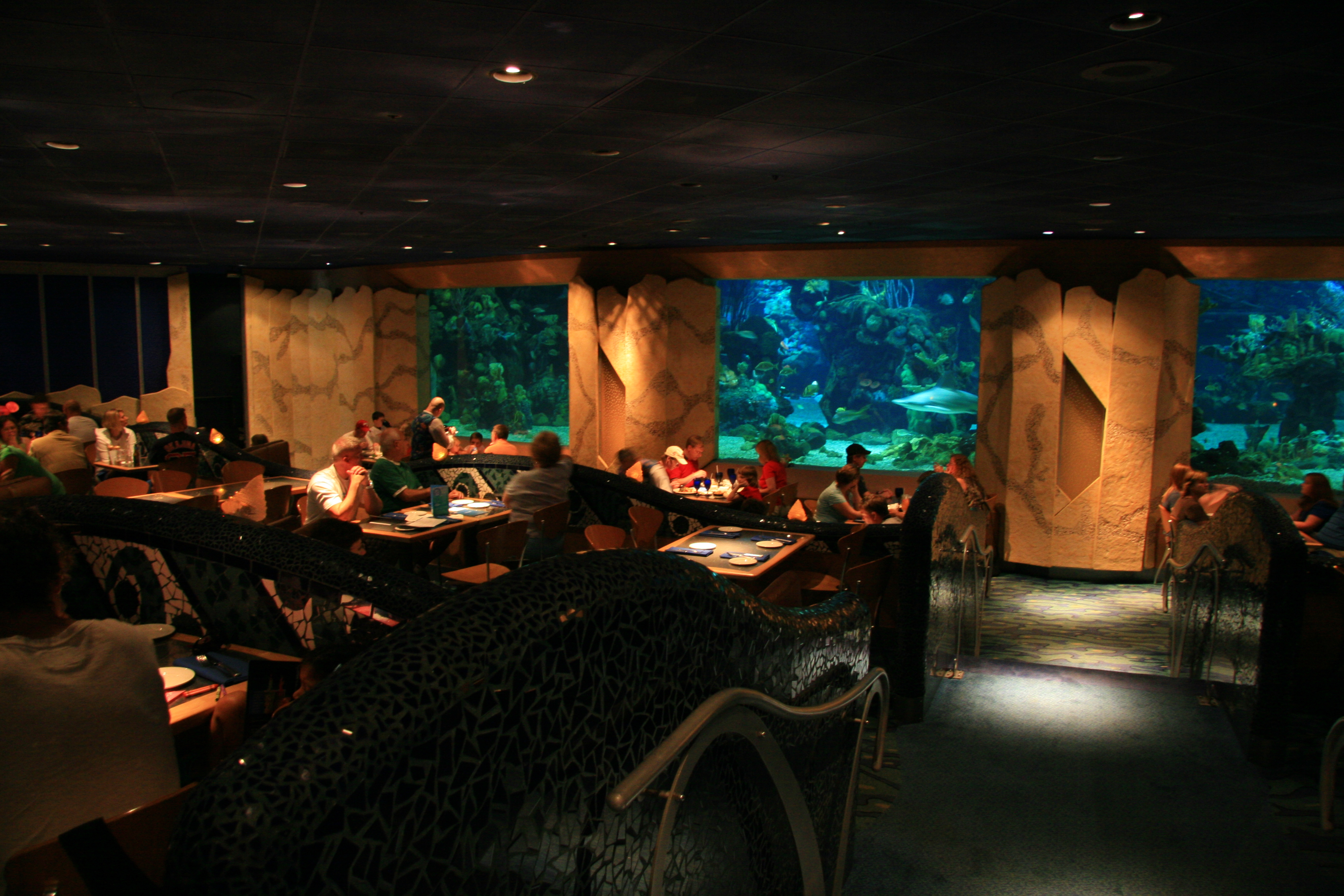
- The interior of the Coral Reef Restaurant
- Interactive map of Coral Reef Restaurant

Restaurant information
- Established: January 15, 1986
- Owner: Walt Disney Parks and Resorts
- Food type: Seafood
- Location: Bay Lake, Orange County, Florida, United States
- Coordinates: 28°22′31″N 81°33′01″W
- Website: Official website

The Coral Reef Restaurant is a themed seafood restaurant in The Seas Pavilion (formerly The Living Seas pavilion) on the western side of Future World (now renamed World Nature) at Epcot, a theme park at the Walt Disney World Resort in Bay Lake, Florida, that opened with the pavilion on January 15, 1986. One entire wall of the restaurant consists of a glass window that is eight inches thick and that provides a view into an aquarium. While they eat, restaurant guests are able to watch tarpons, sharks, sea turtles, stingrays, groupers, and sometimes scuba divers in the six-million-gallon aquarium. Artist Kim Minichiello painted the underwater scene that appears on the restaurant's menu covers. Ron Douglas's cookbook America's Most Wanted Recipes: Just Desserts includes two dishes from the Coral Reef Restaurant: the Baileys and Jack Daniel's Mousse and the Chocolate Wave Cake.

== See also ==
- List of seafood restaurants

== Bibliography ==
- Battista, Lisa M. (2010). Beyond the Attractions: A Guide to Walt Disney World with Preschoolers. MRB Ventures. ISBN 1453640398.
- Cochran, Jason (2009). Pauline Frommer's Walt Disney World and Orlando (2 ed.). John Wiley & Sons. ISBN 0470522496.
- Kidder, Laura M.; Adam Taplin (2007). Fodor's 2008 Walt Disney World: Plus Universal Orlando and Seaworld. Fodor's. ISBN 1400018080.
- Sehlinger, Bob; Liliane Opsomer; Len Testa (2014). The Unofficial Guide to Walt Disney World with Kids 2015. Unofficial Guides. ISBN 162809026X.
- Shumaker, Susan; Than Saffel (2003). Vegetarian Walt Disney World and Greater Orlando: The Essential Guide for the Health-Conscious Traveler. Globe Pequot Press. ISBN 0762727039.
- Steinberg, Phyllis; Arvin Steinberg; Joseph Hayes; Charles Martin (2012). DK Eyewitness Travel Guide: Walt Disney World Resort & Orlando. Penguin Books. ISBN 0756693454.
- Zibart, Eve; David Hoekstra (2009). Unofficial Guide to Walt Disney World For Grown-Ups. John Wiley & Sons. ISBN 0470497394.
