= SS Columbia (Tokyo DisneySea) =

Representation of a passenger ship in a Japanese theme park

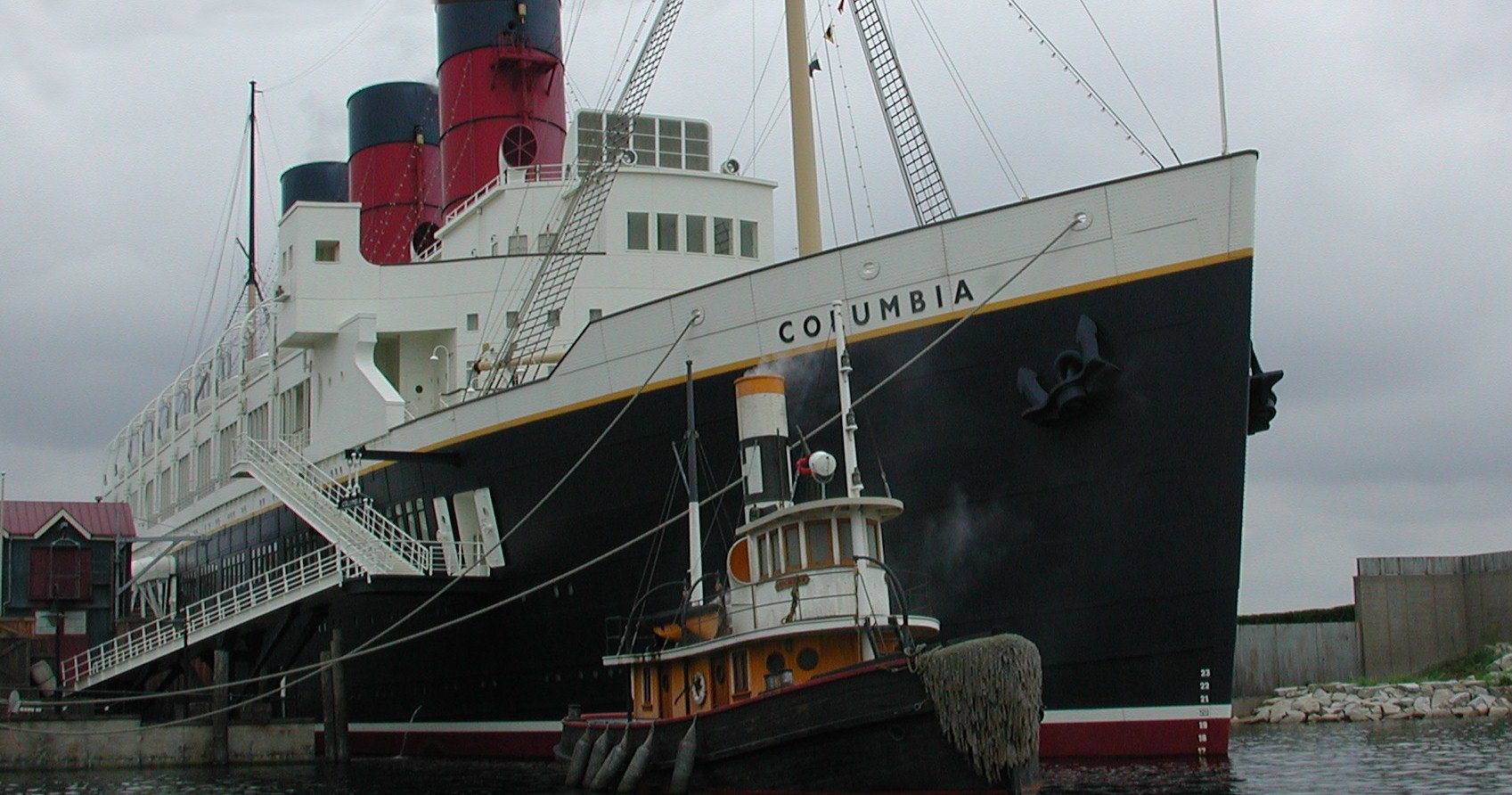
SS Columbia

SS Columbia is a representation of a passenger ship in the Japanese theme park Tokyo DisneySea. It is located in the 'New York Harbor' section of the American Waterfront in the park. The ship was designed as a recreation of a 20th-century steam-powered ocean liner.

== Origin and design ==
Tokyo DisneySea was designed with a nautical and maritime theme. The liner was chosen as a representation of iconic steam liners such as RMS Titanic, though the Columbia is not a specific recreation of the Titanic. The ship's funnels are painted in a similar red to the Cunard Line's colour, and is similar in appearance to the RMS Queen Mary, currently a museum ship and hotel at Long Beach, California. The Columbia was designed as a recreation of the Queen Mary owing to initial plans to build DisneySea at Long Beach, California, an idea which was later scrapped, but many of the designs were transferred to the Tokyo Disney park.

The ship was designed to take visitors to the park from 'New York Harbor' to 'Mediterranean Harbor', two locations in Tokyo DisneySea. To make it more like a 20th-century passenger ship, the ship is towed by a small steam tug before departure.

== Interior and exterior ==
The ship houses a restaurant and serves as the backdrop for live stage shows on the Dockside Stage. The ship's visitors can explore the ship. The ship's upper deck provides elevated views of the park. The main dining room is located on Deck B (the ship's third level). Inside, period atmosphere is provided by music from a grand piano. The attraction Turtle Talk with Crush and two restaurants are located inside the ship.
