= Hurricane Gil (1983) =

1983 Pacific hurricane that affected Hawaii

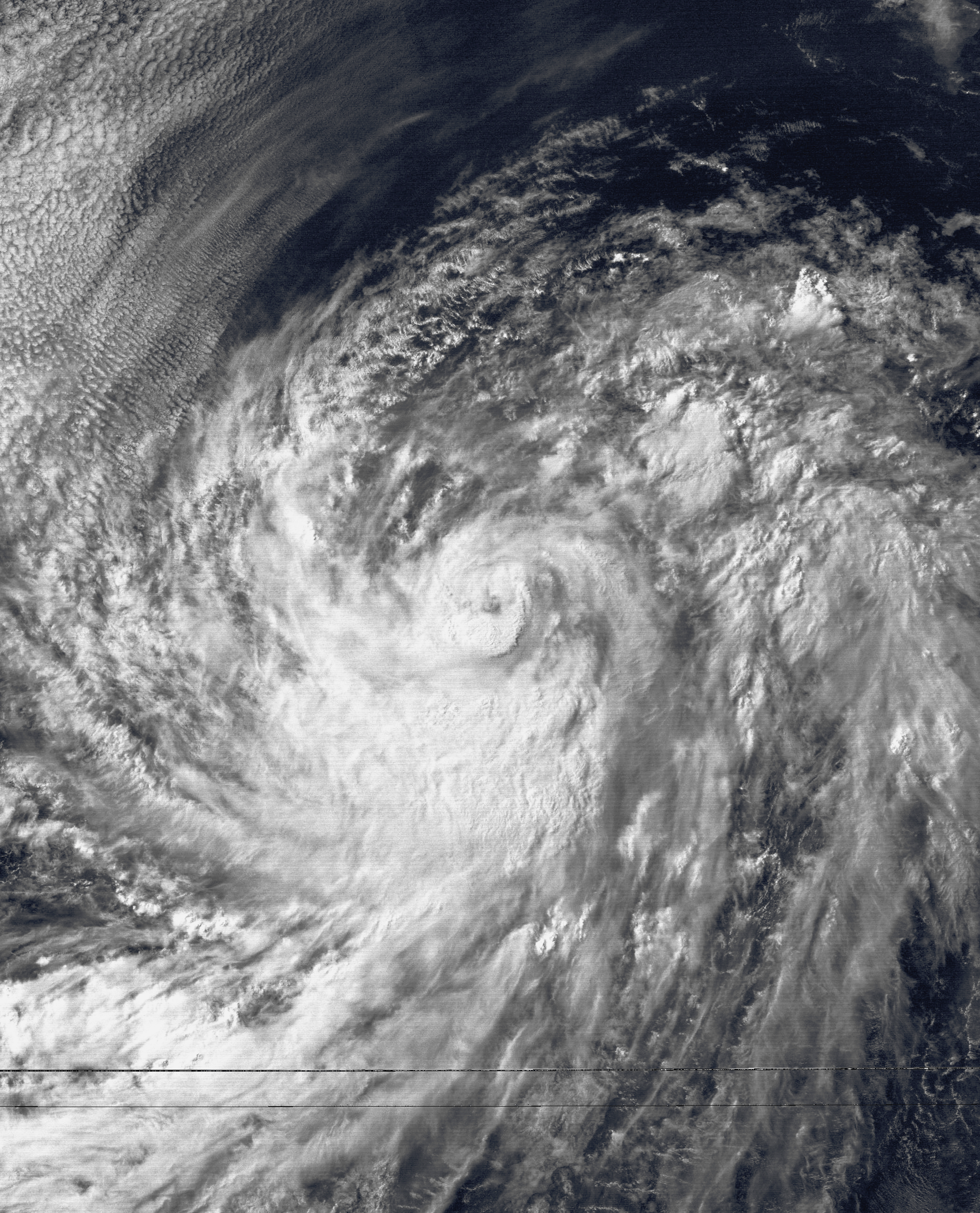
- Gil shortly after peak intensity on July 27

Meteorological history
- Formed: July 23, 1983
- Dissipated: August 5, 1983

Category 1 hurricane
- 1-minute sustained (SSHWS/NWS)
- Highest winds: 90 mph (150 km/h)

Overall effects
- Fatalities: 1
- Damage: Minimal
- Areas affected: Hawaii
- IBTrACS
- Part of the 1983 Pacific hurricane season

Hurricane Gil was the first of several tropical cyclones to affect Hawaii during the 1983 Pacific hurricane season. The seventh named storm and third hurricane of the annual season, Gil originated from a tropical depression that developed near Clipperton Island on July 23. Steadily intensifying, it attained tropical storm status six hours later and was upgraded to a hurricane on July 26. After attaining peak intensity on July 27, Gil encountered cooler sea surface temperatures and began to weaken. Moving west-northwest, the weakening system also accelerated and on July 31, was downgraded to a tropical depression. However, Gil began to re-intensify on August 1, becoming a tropical storm again later that day. Initially expected to veer north of Hawaii, it continued west-northwest and began to approach the Hawaiian group on August 3. While passing through the island group, Gil reached its secondary peak intensity. Subsequently, Gil began to weaken once again as it threatened the Northwestern Hawaiian Islands. After passing through the islands, Gil was downgraded to a tropical depression on August 5. Several hours later, the storm dissipated. The remnants of the storm moved into the West Pacific late on August 6 and were last noted the next morning while passing south of Midway Island.

Due to fears of a repeat of Hurricane Iwa, which devastated the island group the previous year, officials issued many tropical cyclone warnings and watches while seven shelters were opened, though few people actually used these shelters. On Oahu, a power outage was reported, affecting 2,400 customers. Jellyfish also stung 50 people. Locally heavy rainfall and rough seas led to minor damage while strong winds lead to extensive damage on the north side of the island. On Maui and Kauai, minor flooding, as well, though damage was minimal. Offshore, one person is presumed to have died in a shipwreck. In a separate shipping incident, three crewmen were slightly injured. The remnants of Gil later affected the Northwestern Hawaiian Islands, where near-gale force winds were measured. Throughout the state, damage was minimal.

== Meteorological history ==
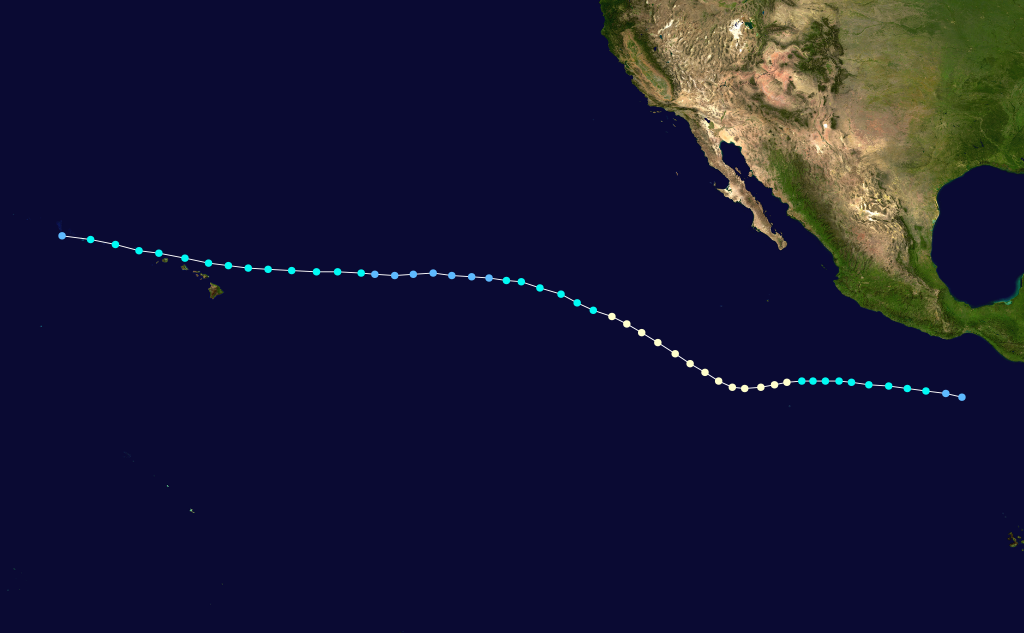
Map plotting the storm's track and intensity, according to the Saffir–Simpson scale Map key Saffir–Simpson scale Tropical depression (≤38 mph, ≤62 km/h) Tropical storm (39–73 mph, 63–118 km/h) Category 1 (74–95 mph, 119–153 km/h) Category 2 (96–110 mph, 154–177 km/h) Category 3 (111–129 mph, 178–208 km/h) Category 4 (130–156 mph, 209–251 km/h) Category 5 (≥157 mph, ≥252 km/h) Unknown Storm type Tropical cyclone Subtropical cyclone Extratropical cyclone, remnant low, tropical disturbance, or monsoon depression

The seventh tropical cyclone of the season originated from a tropical depression that developed during the afternoon hours of July 23 about 200 mi (320 km) north of Clipperton Island. Due to light wind shear and warm ocean temperatures, the Eastern Pacific Hurricane Center (EPHC) upgraded the depression to Tropical Storm Gil at 0000 UTC on July 24. Gil was briefly expected to re-curve and approach Baja California Sur, but this never materialized. Gil subsequently began to intensify; on 0000 UTC July 25, the EPHC reported that Gil had intensified into a strong tropical storm, with winds of 70 mph (115 km/h). Roughly 24 hours later, the storm was upgraded into a Category 1 hurricane on the Saffir-Simpson hurricane wind scale. Early on July 27, the storm attained its peak intensity of 90 mph (145 km/h). Despite turning west-northwest, Hurricane Gil maintained hurricane intensity until 1200 UTC July 29 when the storm began to encounter cooler waters. By 0000 UTC July 31, Gil was downgraded a tropical depression.

Despite a well-defined atmospheric circulation, Gil was still a tropical depression when it entered Central Pacific Hurricane Center's (CPHC) warning zone on August 1. The circulation gradually became better defined moved as the low moved west-northwest over a pool of slightly warmer waters west of 140th meridian west; later that day, the CPHC reportedly re-upgraded Gil into a tropical storm. Meanwhile, the storm was forecast to pass north of the U.S. State of Hawaii. Gil accelerated while approaching the Hawaiian Island group. On August 2, Gil was situated roughly 300 mi (485 km) east of the island chain. Gil re-strengthened slightly; on August 3, the tropical cyclone reached its secondary peak wind speed of 45 mph (70 km/h). Late on August 4, Tropical Storm Gil made its closest approach to Oahu, passing 20 mi (30 km) north of Kahuku Point.

While passing through the archipelago, a Hurricane Hunter aircraft recorded winds of 45 to 50 mph (70 to 80 km/h); however, the CPHC held the intensity of storm at 45 mph (70 km/h) due to calm surface winds. By this time, the strongest winds of the storm were situated north of the center. After clearing the main Hawaiian island chain, Gil began to approach the Hawaiian Leeward Island group. Continuing west-northwest, Gil passed very close to French Frigate Shoals on August 4 as a marginal tropical storm. Early on August 5, the system was downgraded into a tropical depression while centered 145 mi (235 km) west of Tern Island. Later that day, Tropical Depression Gil degenerated into a trough about 300 mi (485 km) west-northwest of Tern Island. The remnants of the storm crossed the International Dateline late on August 6. It then passed 150 mi (240 km) south of Midway Island while still producing deep convection. The remains of Gil were last noted in the West Pacific basin early on August 7.

== Preparations and impact ==
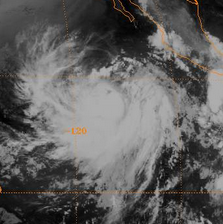
Hurricane Gil strengthening

Due to fears of a repeat of Hurricane Iwa, advisories and warnings for the main Hawaiian Islands were issued by meteorologists and Civil Defense Authorities, who had been criticized for the lack of warning prior to Iwa's near-landfall. Gale warnings were issued for a much of the islands (except for the Big Island), but on August 2, these warnings were discontinued for all islands except for Kauai. High surf advisories were also issued. Furthermore, seven shelters were opened as a precaution. Due to the threat of high waves, residents were warned to be ready to evacuate from low-lying areas.

Tropical Storm Gil was the first tropical cyclone to threaten Hawaii since Hurricane Iwa during did the 1982 Pacific hurricane season, which devastated the region. Due to heavy rains, a couple of people sought shelter in Nanakuli High School on the island. Jellyfish stung 50 tourists along two beaches in Oahu, they were treated by life guards and none required hospitalization; the jellyfish were thought to have been residing there due to the storm. In addition, one beach on Oahu was closed because of high surf, and swimmers were asked to stay out of the water near Waikiki. Locally gusty winds were recorded on Oahu. On the northern part of the island, 70 mph (115 km/h) winds were reported, resulting in extensive damage in some areas, but slight damage to others. A minor power outage on the island briefly left 2,400 customers without electricity. In Maui, the outer rainbands of Hurricane Gil brought heavy precipitation, leading to minor flooding. Although winds were calm, locally heavy showers occurred over Kauai. Rough surf pounded the northeastern facing beaches of that island, as well as the northeastern side of Oahu. A sea level pressure of 1,011 mb (29.9 inHg) was also recorded. Overall, damage from Gil was minimal and less than expected. Later in the season, the state was affected by Tropical Storm Narda and threatened by Hurricane Raymond.

Offshore, several ships were affected by the storm. Most notably, a 19 ft (5.8 m) catamaran, ironically named Hurricane, went missing after leaving Long Beach on July 20. Gil likely sunk this ship. The vessel had a crew of two, one of which was presumed to have died during the storm. However, as the ship lacked radio equipment, this death remains unconfirmed. In addition to the above, the 30-foot ship Adad also got caught into the storm 72 hours after leaving Kauai. Storm surge from all sides nearly sunk the vessel and all three people on board sustained minor injuries, one of which sprained his wrist. After passing the main islands of Hawaii, Gil approached the Leeward Island group. Tropical Storm Gil passed just south of French Frigate Shoals on August 4 as a minimal tropical storm. Winds were light, gusting to 32 mph (51 km/h). Meanwhile, a peak pressure of 1,014 mb (29.9 inHg) was reported.

== See also ==
- Other tropical cyclones named Gil
- List of Hawaii hurricanes
- Hurricane Dalilia (1989)
- Hurricane Felicia (2009)
