= Gil Island =

Gil Island may refer to:

- Gil Island (Canada)
- Gil Island (Azerbaijan)
