= Gilmelândia =

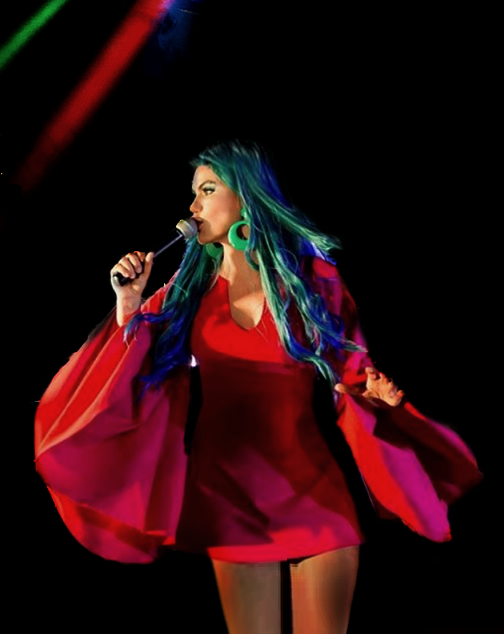
- Gilmelândia in 2016
- Born: Gilmelândia Palmeira dos Santos; September 20, 1972 (age 53)
- Occupations: Singer; songwriter; actress; Television host
- Years active: 1998–present
- Spouse: Anderson Lima
- Musical career
- Genres: Axé; MPB
- Label: Independent
- Website: www.gilmelandia.com.br

Gilmelândia Palmeira dos Santos (born Salvador, Bahia, 20 September 1975), known as Gil or Gilmelândia, is a Brazilian singer, actress and TV presenter. Her unusual first name, which is abbreviated on her CD covers to "Gil", was created by her parents in tribute to a friend of her mother's with an equally unusual name, Jumelânia.

== Albums ==
Title	Details
pt:Me Beija	Released: 21 October 2001; Label: Universal; Format: CD, download digital
pt:Movimento (álbum de Gil)	Released: 9 December 2002; Label: Abril Music; Format: CD, download digital
pt:O Canto da Sereia (álbum)	Released: 10 January 2005; Label: EMI; Format: CD, download digital

== Live albums ==
Title	Details
pt:Gilmelândia ao Vivo	Released: 4 February 2004; Label: Universal; Format: CD, download digital
pt:Vixe Mainha - Ao Vivo	Released: 13 October 2010; Label: Studio UPSe7e; Format: CD, download digital
Ao Vivo em Pernambuco	Released: 10 October 2015; Label: Independent; Format: CD, download digital

== EPs ==
Title	Details
Gil	Released: 28 January 2014; Label: Independent; Format: EP, download digital
Tambor de Gil	Released: 28 May 2015; Label: Independent; Format: EP, download digital

== Compilations ==
Title	Details
pt:Simplesmente Gil	Released: 4 December 2001; Label: Universal; Format: CD

== Singles ==
List of singles, with positions in the selected charts
Singles	Year	Peak chart positions		Album
Singles	Year	BRA	Brasil Salvador	Album
"Maionese"	2001	1	—	Me Beija
"Levada da Breca"	2002	4	—	Me Beija
"Me Beija"	2002	9	—	Me Beija
"Miau"	2002	5	—	Movimento
"Balada Quente"	2003	18	—	Movimento
"Vou Badalar (Final de Semana)"	2003	37	—	Movimento
"Você Não Me Ensinou a Te Esquecer"	2003	14	—	Gilmelândia - Ao Vivo
"Malukete"	2004	7	—	Gilmelândia - Ao Vivo
"Chegou o Verão"	2004	1	—	O Canto da Sereia
"Vem de Lá"	2005	37	—	O Canto da Sereia
"Dominado"	2008	36	—	Not added to any album
"Rua"	2009	59	—	Vixe Mainha - Ao Vivo
"Na Paz de Jah" (com Vixe Mainha)	2010	—	—	Vixe Mainha - Ao Vivo
"Saudade"	2010	—	—	Gil
"Burugudum"	2012	—	18	Gil
"Pompimpom"	2012	—	—	Gil
"Paz e Amor (It's Gonna Be Good)" (part. Ed City)	2015	—	—	Tambor de Gil
"Te Dou"	2015	—	—	Tambor de Gil
"Meu Afro"	2016	—	—	Tambor de Gil
"—" Denotes singles that did not enter the musical charts or were not released in the country.
