= Generic Image Library =

Generic Image Library (GIL), is an open source generic programming library created by Adobe Systems for image-related programming. It was accepted to the Boost C++ Libraries in November 2006 and is included in Boost's latest official release.
