= Gill, South Dakota =

Coordinates: 45°23′57″N 103°07′02″W

Gill is a ghost town in Harding County, in the U.S. state of South Dakota.

== History ==
A post office called Gill was established in 1912, and remained in operation until 1945. The town derived its name from early postmaster Carl M. Gilberg.
