= The Seas with Nemo & Friends =

Pavilion and ride at Epcot

Coordinates: 28°22′31.34″N 81°33′3.17″W

- The pavilion logo used since 2019 on Epcot signage, inspired by the original logo of The Living Seas The attraction logo used since 2007

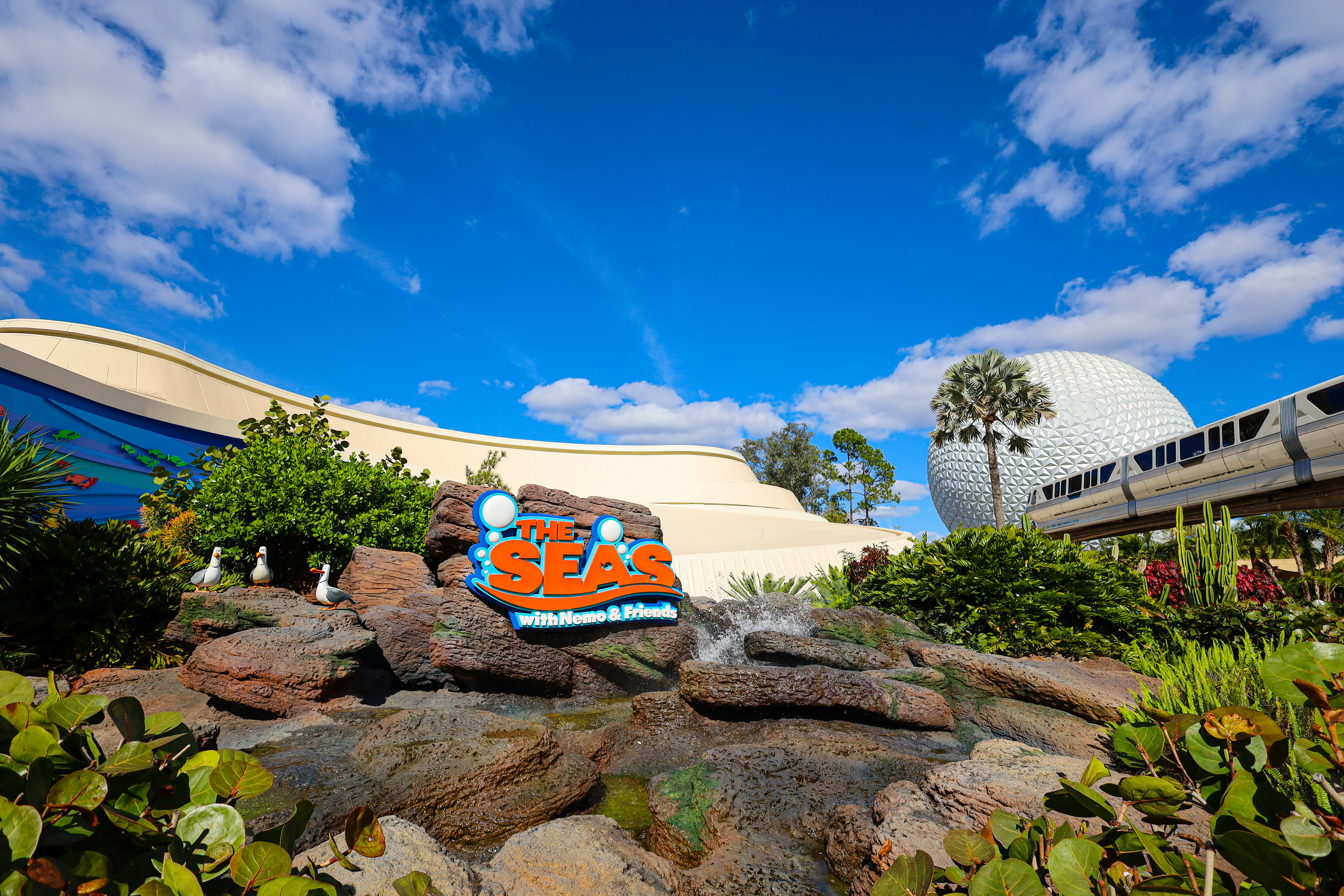
- Marquee and entrance to the pavilion

Epcot
- Area: Future World (2007–2021); World Nature (2021–present)
- Status: Operating
- Opening date: January 4, 2007
- Replaced: The Living Seas (Future World)

Ride statistics
- Attraction type: Aquarium/Dark ride
- Manufacturer: Montgomery Watson
- Designer: Walt Disney Imagineering
- Theme: Finding Nemo, Underwater exploration base
- Site area: 185,000 sq ft (17,200 m^{2})
- Capacity: 2,200 riders per hour
- Vehicle type: Omnimovers, styled as “clam mobiles”
- Riders per vehicle: 2–3
- Tank size: • 5,700,000 US gallons (22,000 m^{3}) • 793,000 US gallons (3,000 m^{3}) kept in storage
- Number of creatures: 8,500
- Audio-Animatronics: Yes
- Lightning Lane available
- Wheelchair accessible
- Assistive listening available

The Living Seas

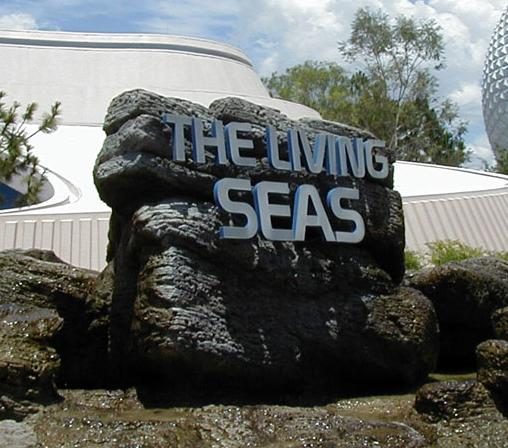
- The Living Seas logo (top) and marquee entrance to the pavilion (bottom)

Epcot
- Area: Future World
- Status: Removed
- Opening date: January 15, 1986
- Closing date: August 21, 2005
- Replaced by: The Seas with Nemo & Friends (World Nature)

Ride statistics
- Attraction type: Aquarium
- Designer: WED Enterprises
- Theme: Underwater exploration base
- Music: George Wilkins and Russell Brower
- Sponsor: United Technologies (1986–1998)
- Wheelchair accessible

The Seas with Nemo & Friends (formerly The Living Seas) is a pavilion and aquarium located in the World Nature section of Epcot, a theme park at the Walt Disney World Resort in Bay Lake, Florida. The pavilion is themed as an oceanic exploration base called SeaBase Alpha, with several exhibits devoted to oceanic study. The building includes an aquarium and its attached dark ride attraction, a talk show-type attraction called Turtle Talk with Crush, and the Coral Reef Restaurant. With 5.7 million US gallons of tank volume, the pavilion is also the second-largest aquarium in the U.S. and the ninth-largest in the world.

The Living Seas opened in 1986 but had been planned as part of the park since its opening in 1982. The pavilion was re-themed in 2006 as The Seas with Nemo & Friends after the 2003 film Finding Nemo.

== History ==
=== The Living Seas (1986–2005) ===
The Living Seas opened to the public on January 15, 1986. It housed the largest saltwater tank in the world at its completion, holding 5.7 million US gallons (22,000,000 L) of water, but was surpassed in 2005 with the opening of the Georgia Aquarium. The concept of the building was to take visitors under the ocean to "Sea Base Alpha". Guests viewed a short movie about the formation of the oceans entitled The Sea, which was followed by an elevator ride to the ocean floor aboard a "Hydrolator" (in reality, guests rode a stationary hydraulic elevator while moving walls, sound effects, and a vibrating floor gave the effect of traveling a long distance downward). Guests then boarded a Seacab on the Caribbean Coral Reef Ride and rode through the middle of the tank. They then disembarked into the main exhibit area where they could interact with various multimedia displays. Once finished, guests leaving the pavilion would then board another Hydrolator to the surface (which, similar to the first set of elevators, simulated upward motion).

The Living Seas was sponsored by United Technologies from its opening until 1998. After the departure of United Technologies as the sponsor of The Living Seas, significant changes were made to the pavilion. All sponsorship references were removed from the pavilion. Preshow theatre #2 was removed and a corridor was built through its space, allowing guests to bypass the preshow if they wished to go directly to the Hydrolators.

On October 21, 2001, as a result of declining patronage following the September 11 attacks, the Seacabs closed down and were walled off. The queue of the Seacab ride was left intact and the Seacabs were still visible to guests through the ocean tank windows. After they closed, guests leaving the Hydrolators walked along the former wheelchair bypass corridor to Sea Base Alpha. Now, guests had the option of viewing the preshow or going directly to the Hydrolators and simply walking to Sea Base Alpha.

=== The Seas with Nemo & Friends/The Seas (2007–present) ===
In December 2003, Disney began to re-theme The Living Seas into a new pavilion based on the recently released Pixar film Finding Nemo. The majority of the transformation began with exterior elements, but in January 2004, the interior began to change as well. On November 16, 2004, Turtle Talk with Crush opened in what was once Module 1C, or the Earth Systems exhibit. The show's unexpected success overwhelmed the pavilion, causing the development of plans to move Turtle Talk with Crush to a larger area in the pavilion.

Turtle Talk with Crush was only the beginning of changes to The Living Seas. On August 21, 2005, The Living Seas closed for its transformation into The Seas with Nemo & Friends. Parts of the pavilion reopened in late November 2005. Outside the pavilion, the facade and mural were changed and depictions of sea life seen in Finding Nemo were added. The exit Hydrolators had been removed and were replaced with glass doors that served as an exit and temporary entrance. Sea Base Alpha had been re-themed to Finding Nemo and the entire original preshow area was in the process of being rebuilt. Decor and signage were replaced and scientific displays were replaced by ones themed to Finding Nemo. Turtle Talk with Crush remained as popular as it was before the transformation.

Throughout 2006, construction walls hid the preshow area which was undergoing reconstruction. With the former Sea Base Alpha open, work progressed on the new queue areas and the Seacabs were being rebuilt as a new "Clamobile" attraction. The remaining Living Seas preshow theater, entrance Hydrolators, holding areas, and Seacabs queue were all completely removed and replaced by a new themed queue area. Hydrolator Three and Theater 1 were replaced by a number of new dark ride sets. The former Seacabs ride was lengthened by 280 feet (85 m) through the space formerly used by the preshow theatre, but the final section still took place inside the tank. A new projection technology was added to the tank and the new show scenes. The existing Seacabs were given a clamshell shape and renamed "Clamobiles". Three Audio-Animatronic seagulls were also added to the entrance. They periodically flap their wings and say "Mine! Mine! Mine!", just like the seagulls do in Finding Nemo.

On October 10, 2006, the construction walls in front of the entrance to The Living Seas, now The Seas with Nemo & Friends, were removed. The temporary entrance was removed from the exit. Turtle Talk With Crush was removed from Module 1C, and relocated to the second preshow theater, which had been unused since 1999 when it had been broken up by the bypass corridor following United Technologies' discontinuation of sponsorship. Module 1A was turned into a pre-show space for the expanded Turtle Talk With Crush, with its exhibits moving to 1C, while a new queue line corridor was built from the module into the existing theater space using a backstage fire exit. The Seas with Nemo & Friends was rededicated on January 24, 2007.

It was the first Epcot Pavilion to be based on a Disney animated movie property, and only the second Epcot attraction to use characters from the movies (The Lion King-based Circle of Life: An Environmental Fable at The Land Pavilion's Harvest Theater was the first, opening in 1995 replacing Symbiosis).

In late 2019, new directory signage was installed in Seabase Alpha, restoring the former Living Seas logo, as the pavilion was now renamed "The Seas" Pavilion.

In September 2023, the three audio-animatronic seagulls found at the entrance and character cut-outs on the facade of the building were temporarily removed while cosmetic refurbishments took place. It was during this refurbishment that the building was repainted back to its original color scheme. On July 22, 2025, it was announced that Diver Look-Out Chambers would return in the Seas Pavilion, which became part of the section of World Nature at EPCOT, since the demonstration was being temporarily closed and the Future World area was permanently closed due to the COVID-19 pandemic for five years ago.

On August 3, 2025, it was announced that changed the name of SeaBase into SeaBase Aquarium as a new entrance sign of the gift shop, in the Seas Pavilion, which became part of the section of World Nature at EPCOT.

== Pavilion ==
=== Attractions ===
- The Seas with Nemo & Friends — Guests board "Clamobiles" and venture into the sea to join Marlin, Dory, and other characters from the film Finding Nemo, as they search for Nemo who has gotten lost again. Guests first journey through a coral reef where they find Marlin searching for Nemo. Farther along the reef, they come across Mr. Ray and his students, setting out to explore and look for Nemo. Dory soon joins Marlin in the search and they come upon a group of jellyfish. An anglerfish comes out of the darkness and begins to chase them frantically. Guests dive deeper and come upon the wreck of a massive submarine that sits in the center of a deadly minefield. Peeking out from the wreck is Bruce, a great white shark, and Chum, a mako shark, trying to coax Nemo out from his hiding spot. (Anchor, a hammerhead shark is not included in the ride.) They assure him in their sneaky voices that fish are friends, not food. The Clamobiles are then swept up into the East Australian Current with Nemo, Crush, and Squirt. The current empties the guests out into a massive aquarium where Nemo is reunited once again with his friends. As they sing a closing song, "In the Big Blue World" (although the ride opened first, this song was adapted from the Disney's Animal Kingdom show Finding Nemo - The Musical), these animated Pixar characters swim in the actual aquarium with real fish through the use of special effect glass. The Clamobiles then return to the surface.
- Sea Base — Main viewing area of the aquarium. A smaller aquarium features a pair of rescued West Indian manatees. Other small tanks feature a variety of species from moray eels to seahorses, and other species that cannot interact with divers or other fish in the main exhibit. A large, cylindrical tank in which guests can view from the center used to exhibit a pod of three common bottlenose dolphins in one corner. It has since been replaced with a juvenile sandbar shark. The other three-quarters of the exhibit hold a wide array of species, including sand tiger sharks, naso tang, threadfin butterflyfish, cowtail stingray, orange-lined triggerfish, sandbar sharks, bowmouth guitarfish, bonnethead sharks, Atlantic tarpon, shovelnose guitarfish, a green sea turtle, a blacknose shark, and a zebra shark.
- Turtle Talk with Crush — An interactive show with the sea turtle from Finding Nemo who answers children's questions about the sea. The show now features characters from the movie Finding Dory.

=== Restaurants ===
- Coral Reef Restaurant — A table service restaurant. One wall is made of glass and offers views into the aquarium.

=== Shopping ===
- SeaBase Aquarium Gift Shop

=== Experiences ===
- Epcot DiveQuest — A little-known attraction, certified SCUBA divers have the ability to experience a 40-minute underwater tour of the 5.7 million US gallons (22,000 m^{3}) tank of the Caribbean Coral Reef Aquarium. The entire experience lasts about three hours and includes a guided underwater tour, a "free-play" time, and a backstage tour of the aquarium's inner works. Guests also have the ability to purchase a video or photos of the dive.
- Epcot Seas Aqua Tour — The Epcot Seas Aqua Tour is an experience that debuted in late 2002 at The Living Seas where guests can swim in the aquarium with the assistance of a SAS (SCUBA Assisted Snorkel) System.
- Dolphins in Depth — Dolphins in Depth was an experience where guests went on a tour mostly concentrated on the dolphins in The Seas aquarium. Guests interacted with the dolphins in waist-deep water. The experience stopped being offered in October of 2024, when the dolphins were removed from the exhibit and moved to other facilities.

=== VIP room ===
This pavilion has a backstage VIP room that is used for private events, such as weddings and conventions. The room is long and curved with wood-paneled walls. One side has floor-to-ceiling windows into the aquarium. The room also has an acrylic glass see-through piano.

== Voice cast ==
- Anthony DeMarco as Nemo
- Jess Harnell as Marlin
- Jennifer Hale as Dory
- Andrew Stanton as Crush and Seagulls
- Nicholas Bird as Squirt
- Barry Humphries as Bruce
- Bob Peterson as Mr. Ray
- Allison Janney as Peach

== Consultants and advisers ==
- Dr. Robert Ballard, Senior Scientist, Woods Hole Oceanographic Institution
- Dr. Sylvia Earle, Vice President, Ocean Engineering, Inc.
- Mr. Gilbert Grosvenor, President, National Geographic Society
- Dr. Murray Newman, Director, Vancouver Aquarium Marine Science Centre
- Professor William Nierenberg, Director, Scripps Institution of Oceanography
- Dr. David Potter, Vice President, Public Affairs, General Motors Corporation
- Dr. John Ryther, Director, Division of Applied Biology, Harbor Branch Foundation, Inc.
- Mr. Robert Wildman, Deputy Director, NOAA, Office of Sea Grants Program

== Gallery ==
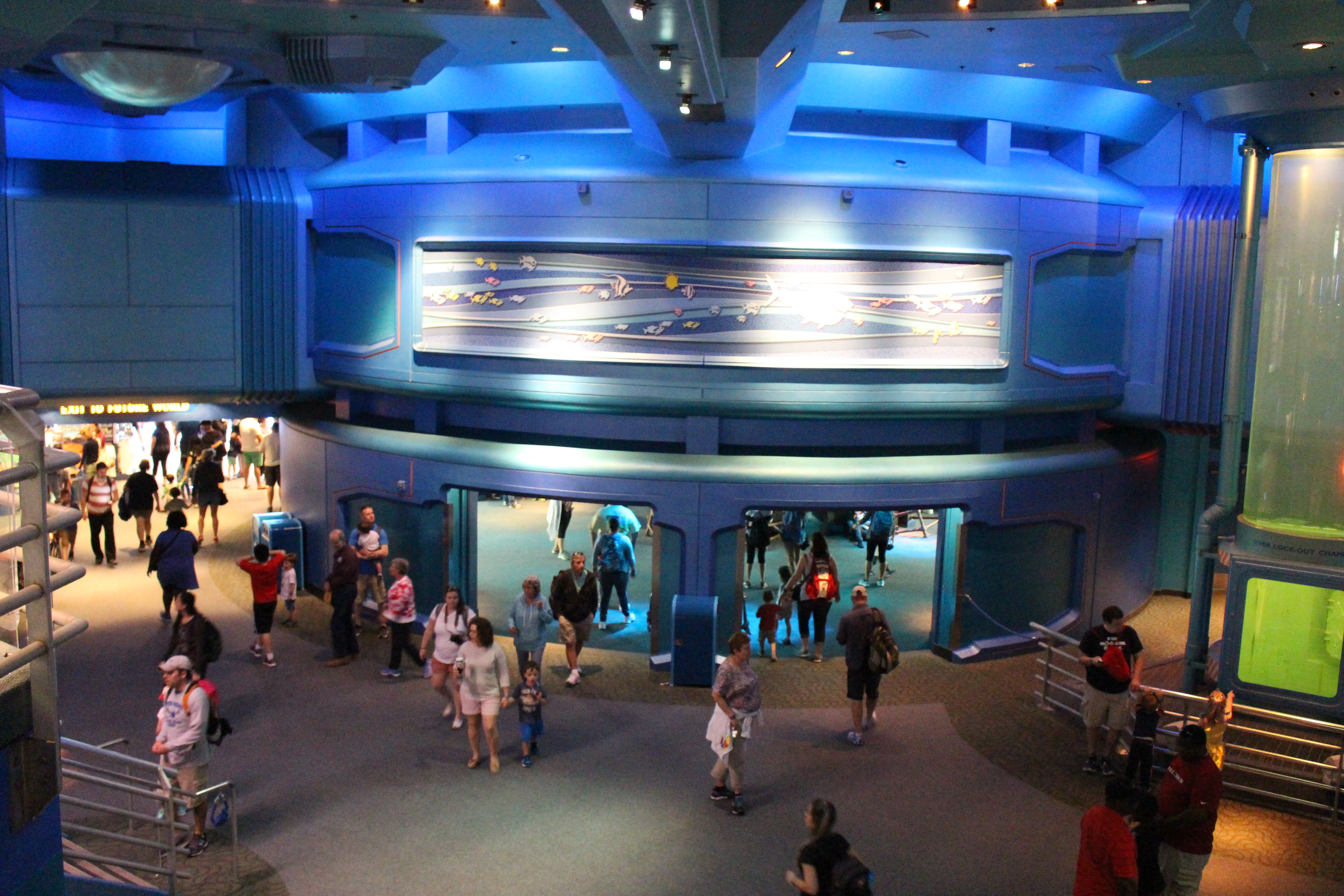

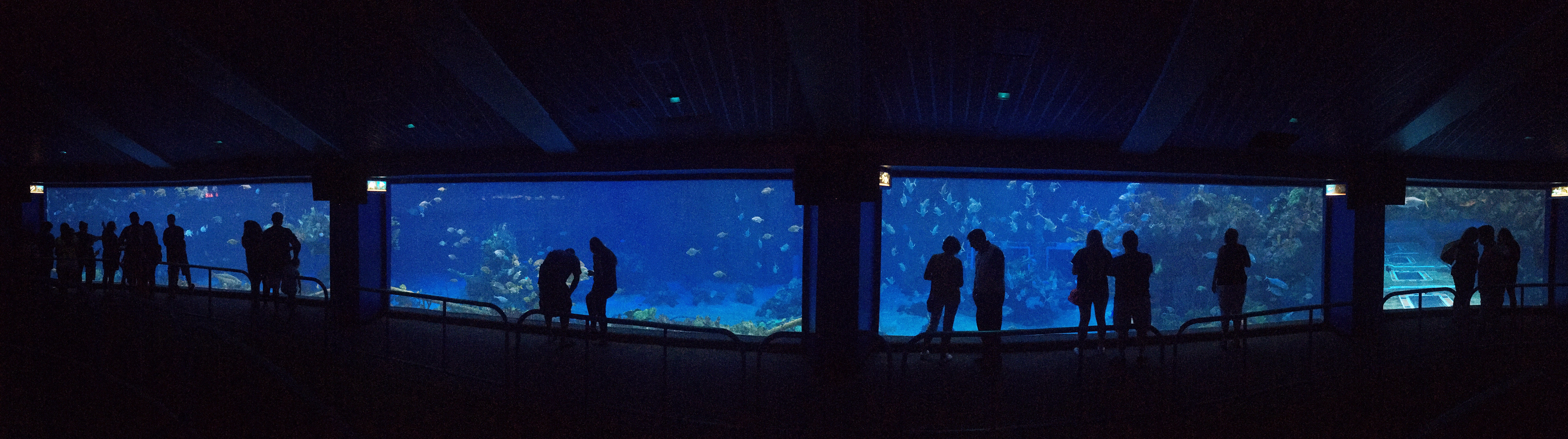

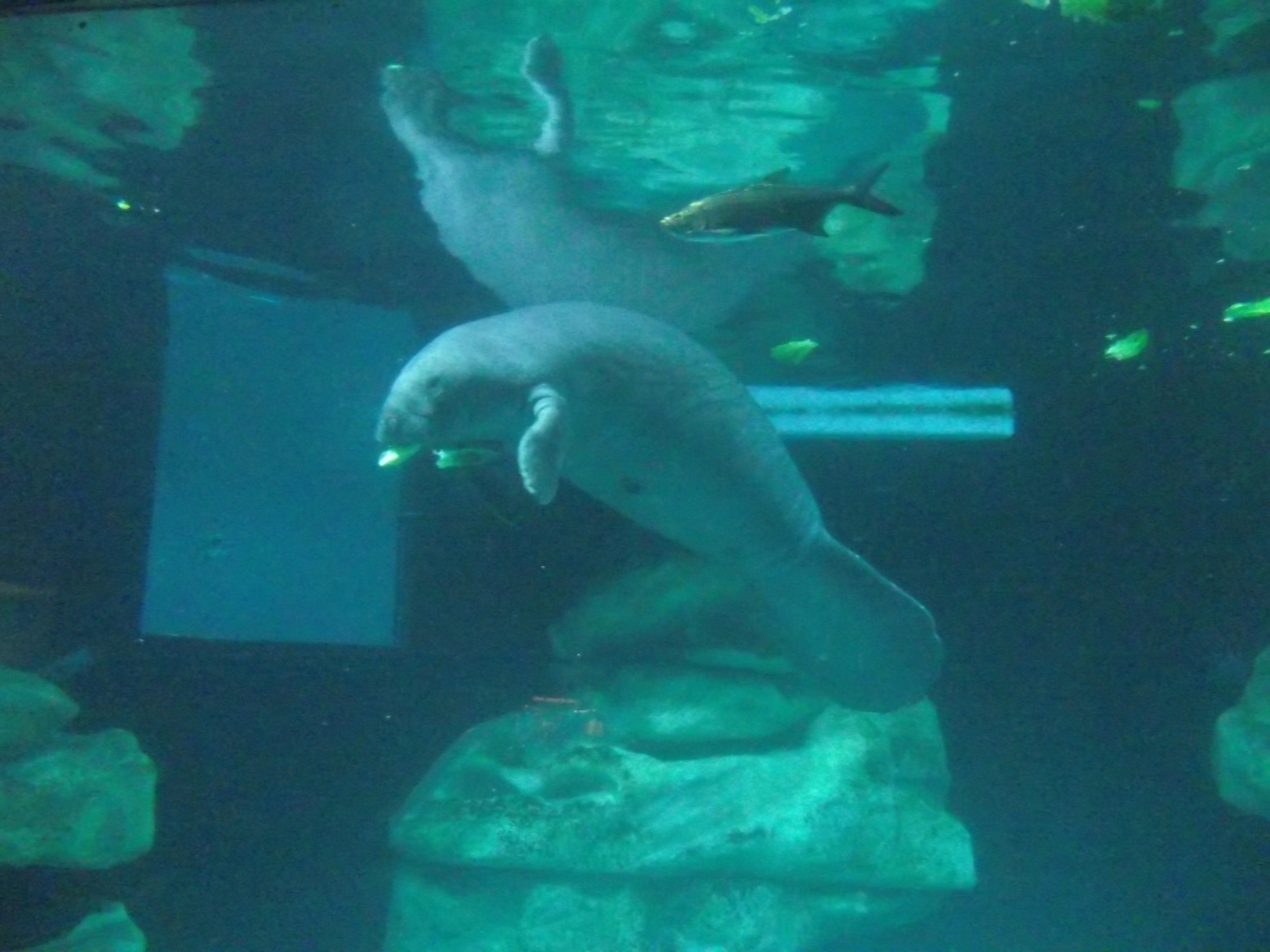

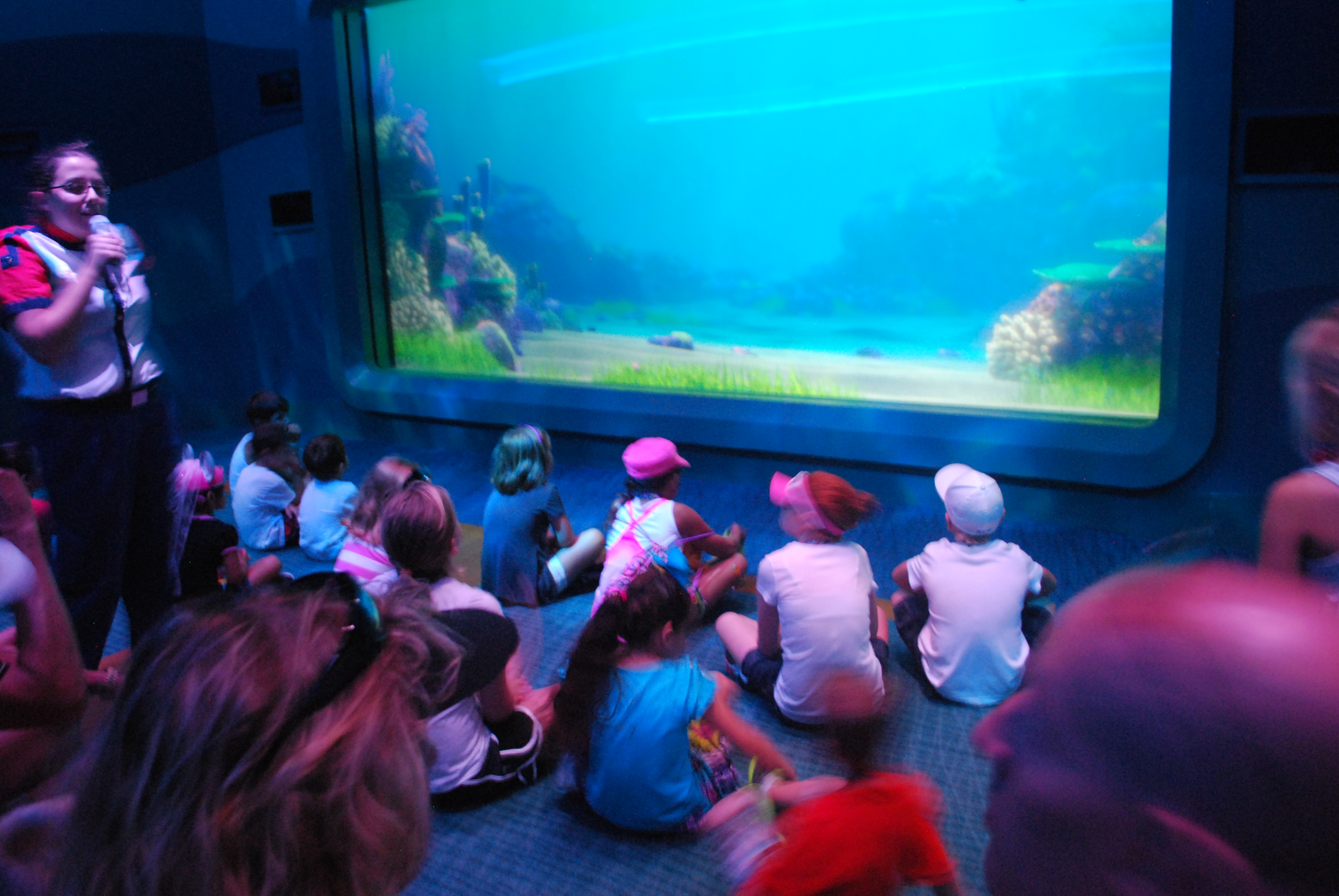

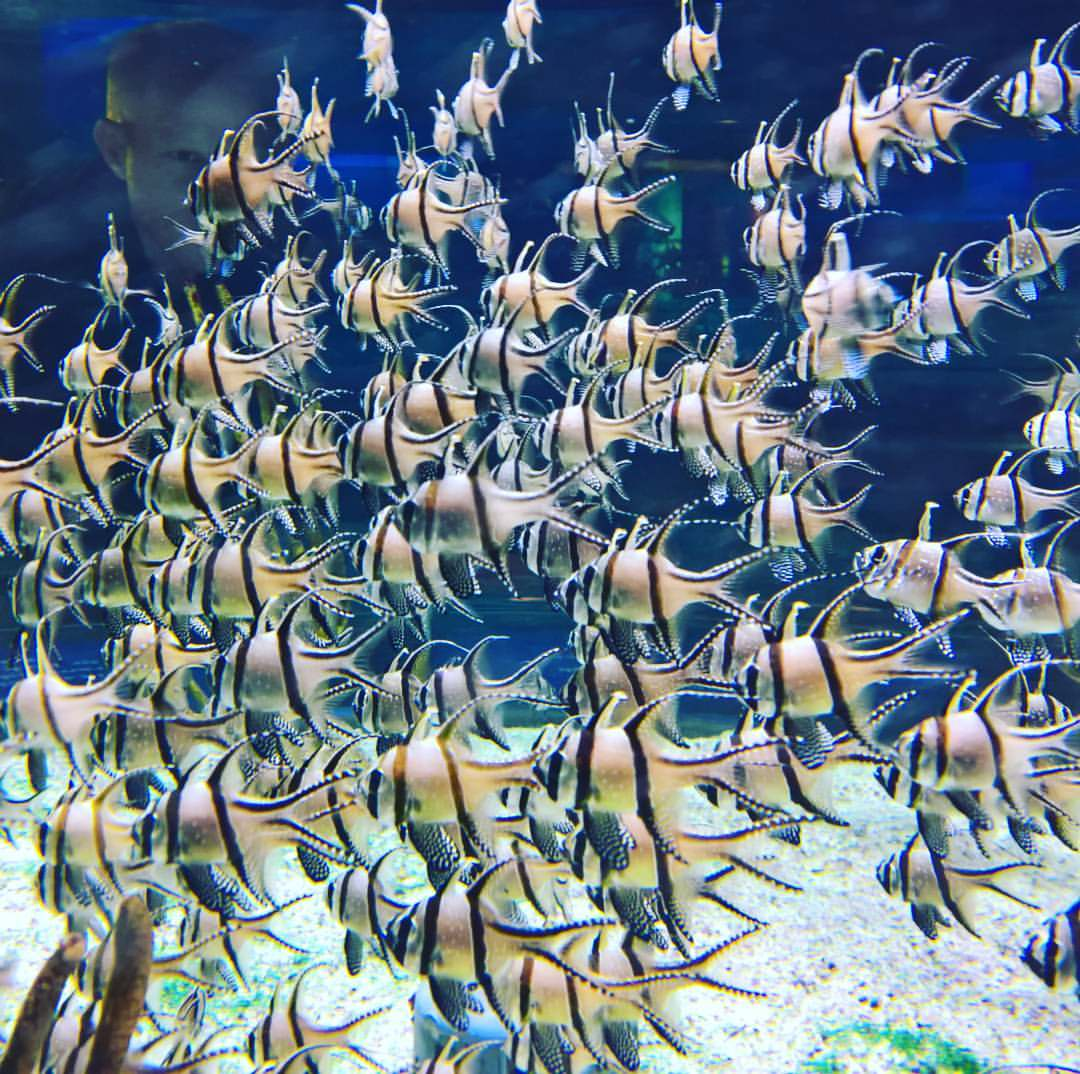

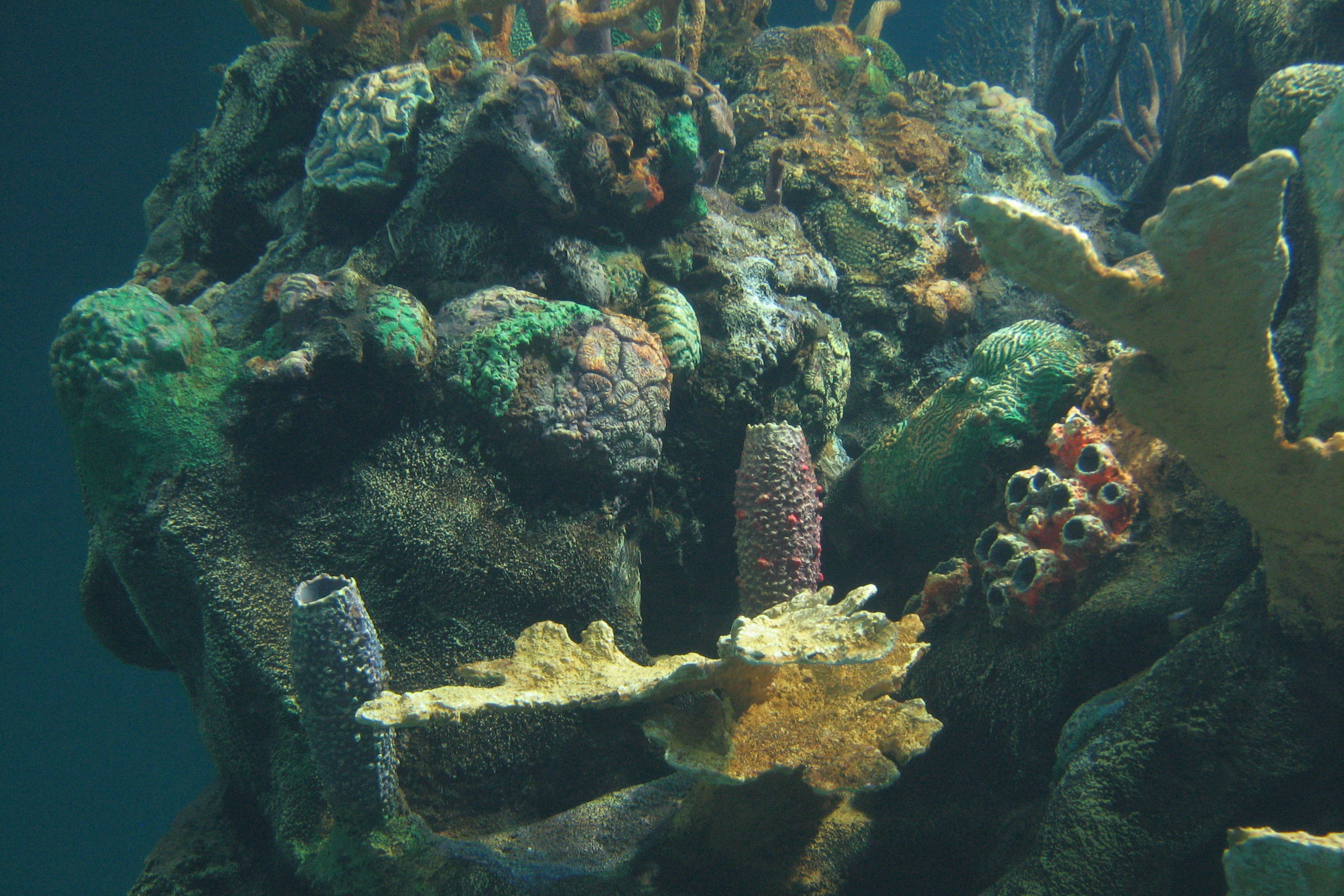

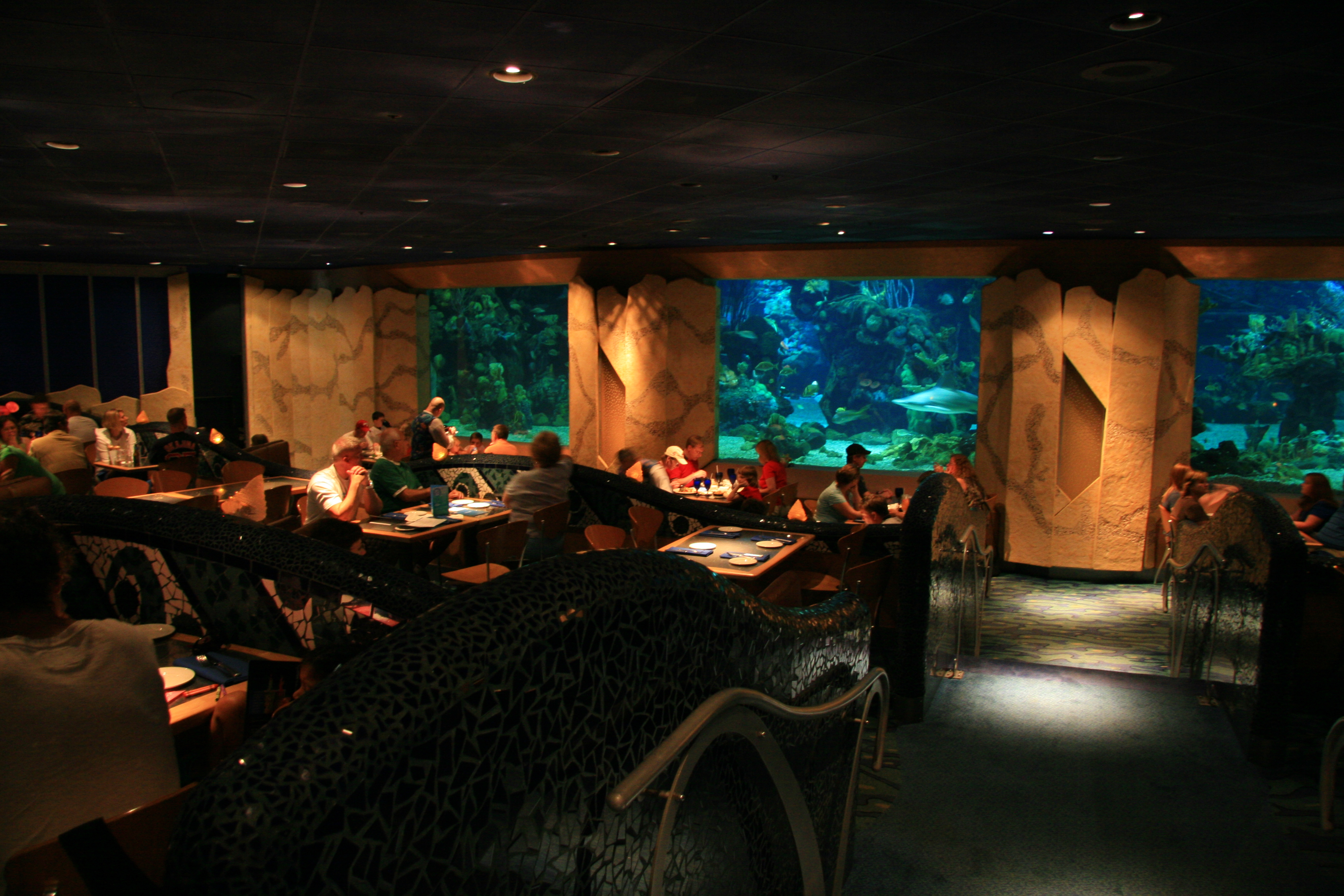

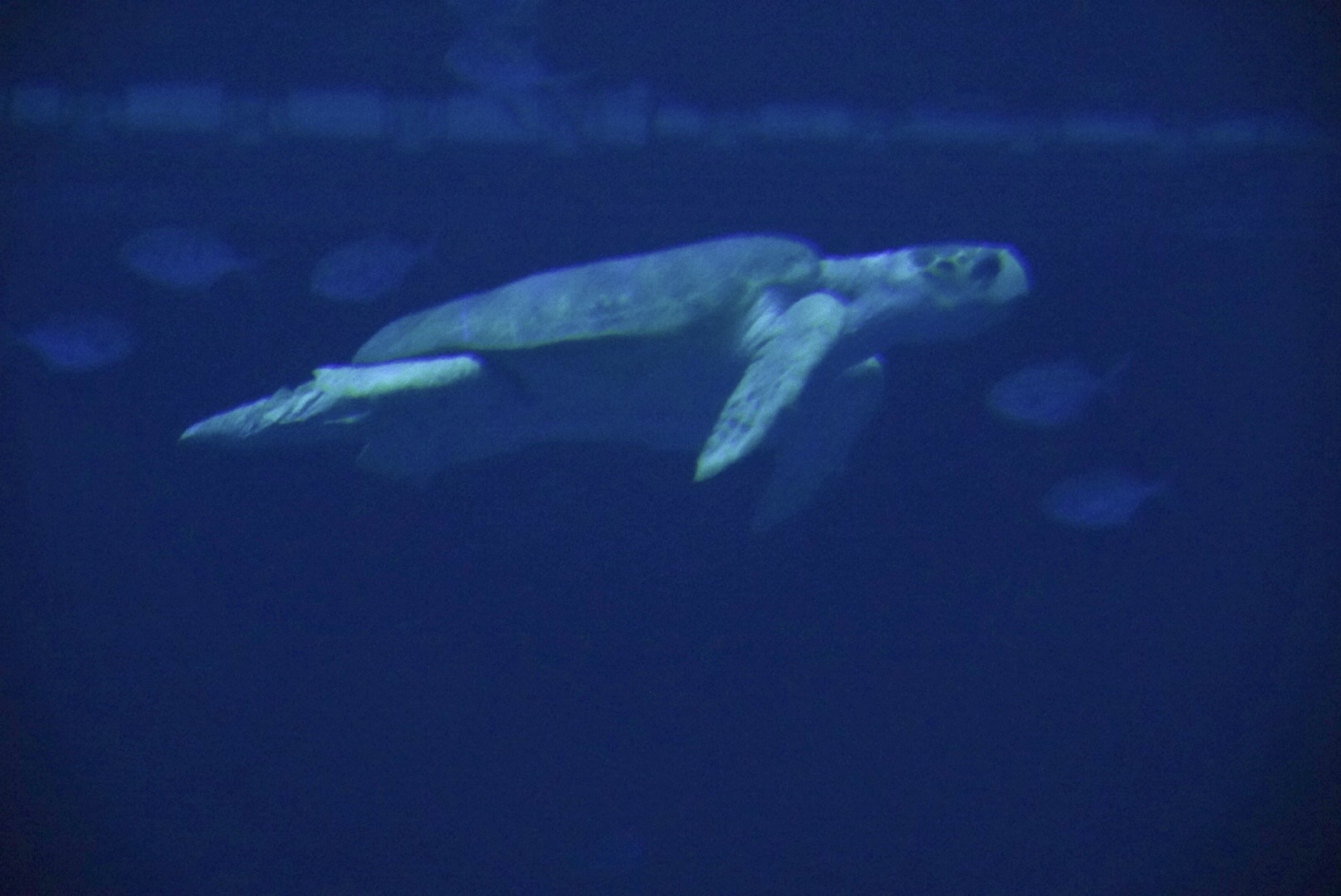

== See also ==
- List of Epcot attractions
- Finding Nemo Submarine Voyage, a loosely related attraction at Disneyland
