= Turtle Talk with Crush =

Interactive show at Disney theme parks

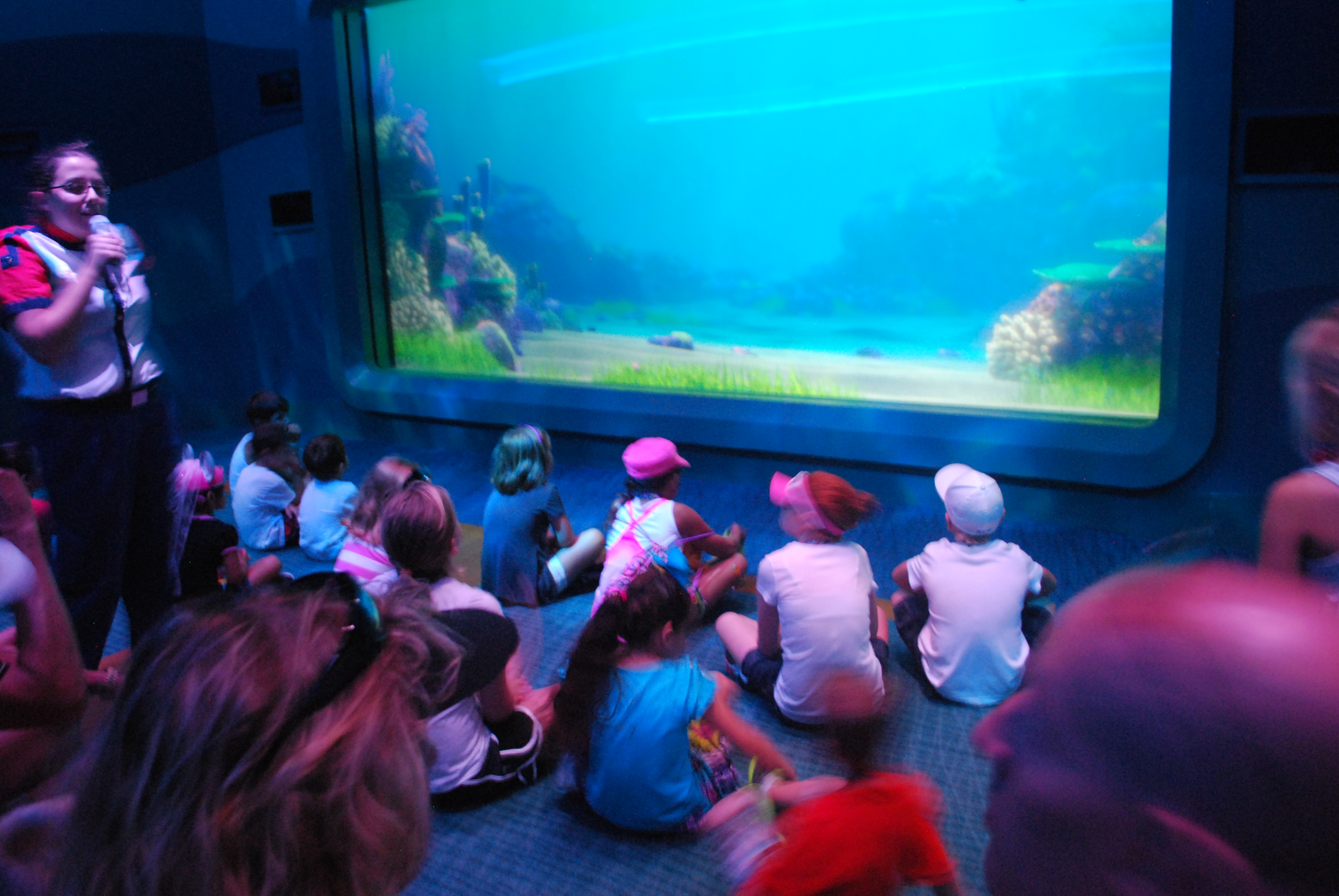
- Children await Crush at Epcot, while a Cast Member speaks prior to starting the show

Epcot
- Area: The Seas, Future World (2004–2021); The Seas, World Nature (2021–present)
- Status: Operating
- Opening date: November 11, 2004
- Lightning Lane Available

Disney California Adventure
- Area: Hollywood Land (Disney Animation)
- Status: Operating
- Opening date: July 15, 2005

Hong Kong Disneyland
- Name: Turtle Talk with Crush 哈囉阿古
- Area: Main Street, U.S.A.
- Status: Removed
- Opening date: May 24, 2008
- Closing date: August 10, 2008

Tokyo DisneySea
- Name: Turtle Talk
- Area: American Waterfront
- Status: Operating
- Opening date: October 1, 2009

Children's Hospital of Orange County
- Name: Turtle Talk with Crush
- Status: Operating
- Opening date: 2013

Ride statistics
- Attraction type: Interactive talk show
- Designer: Walt Disney Imagineering
- Theme: Finding Nemo
- Duration: 10-16 minutes
- Show host: Crush
- Wheelchair accessible
- Assistive listening available

Turtle Talk with Crush is an interactive talk show type attraction that has appeared at Disney theme parks. It first opened on November 11, 2004, at The Living Seas pavilion (later renamed The Seas with Nemo and Friends) at Epcot; it later opened at Disney California Adventure on July 15, 2005, and at Tokyo DisneySea on October 1, 2009. It also operated as a temporary attraction at Hong Kong Disneyland from May 24 to August 10, 2008.

Designed by Walt Disney Imagineering in collaboration with Pixar, the attraction consists of an improvisational, real-time conversation with Crush, the green sea turtle from Pixar's 2003 film Finding Nemo.

A similar show is featured in the Animator's Palate restaurant aboard Disney Cruise Line's Disney Dream and Disney Fantasy. In addition, another Turtle Talk with Crush show was established inside the Children's Hospital of Orange County in early 2013 to entertain child patients and their families, and operates twice daily.

== Attraction description ==
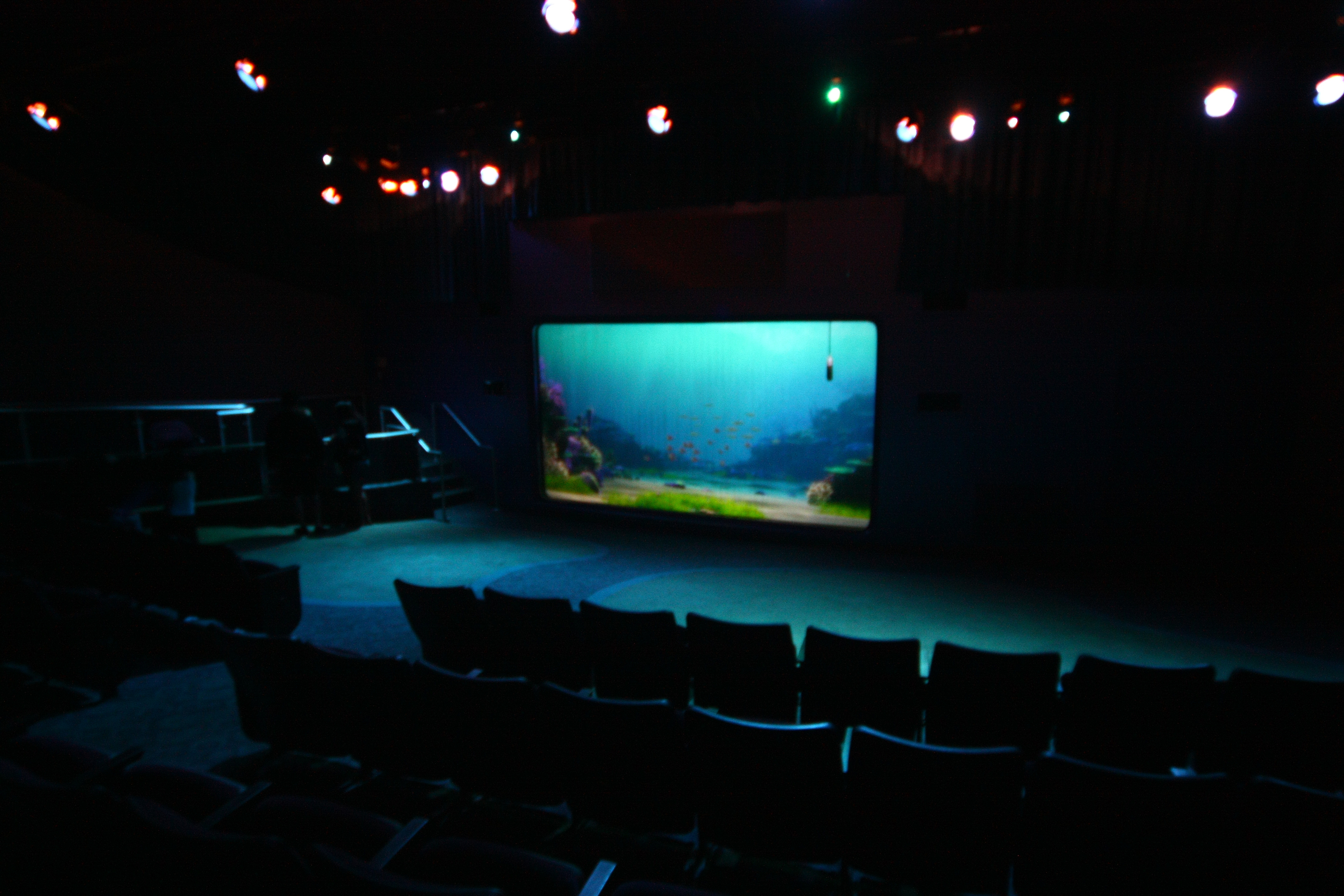
Turtle Talk with Crush at Disney California Adventure

Guests are admitted to a movie theater-like room featuring what appears to be a large aquarium-style window opening onto an undersea vista. Children are encouraged to sit on a carpeted area up front so that they may have a better view, while parents and other adults sit on benches behind them. The host and moderator gives a brief introduction to the show, and then Crush swims down to appear in the window. Crush looks and sounds much as he does in Finding Nemo, complete with animated facial expressions and subtle gestures. With the help of the moderator, Crush selects children and adults from the audience and engages them individually in dialogue, asking them questions and responding with quick wit and humor to questions about his life as a sea turtle or any other questions guests choose to ask. Crush individually chooses the children by saying what they are wearing (e.g.: "Oh hey, dudette in the pink shell (shirt) down on the sub floor, what is your name?").

Other events may occur during this improvised conversation, including cameo appearances by other characters from the original film and its sequel. Though the format, structure and rough duration of the show are consistent, the show itself varies considerably depending on the guests' questions and comments. For example, if an audience member asks where Dory is, a special ending involving Dory and Destiny will be triggered, complete with another attempt by Dory and her friend Destiny to speak whale. Crush will also refer to the Finding Nemo Submarine Voyage when asked where Nemo is, saying he is at the Tomorrowland Lagoon (where that attraction is).

== History ==
The show was developed as part of Walt Disney Imagineering's "Living Character Initiative", a project to develop non-human characters—usually in the form of animatronics controlled and/or voiced remotely, but also including the possibility of autonomous agents—that could actively interact with park guests. To overcome the limitations of physical animatronics, experiments had been conducted with attractions incorporating real-time 3D graphics and digital puppetry: a prototype attraction known as "Mickey's Toon Elevator" would have starred a 3D animated Mickey Mouse voiced and controlled by a cast member.

Concerns were raised over whether Mickey could be consistently and correctly portrayed in-character by varying operators, especially due to the character's status as Disney's flagship property. At the suggestion of Imagineering's vice president Tom Fitzgerald, the team pivoted to developing a tech demo incorporating Stitch from the then-upcoming Lilo & Stitch. This resulted in Stitch's Picture Phone—an exhibit at Disneyland's Innoventions which allowed guests to engage in an interactive meeting with a 3D animated Stitch, presented as being a video call from Hawaii. The character's actions were controlled using a gamepad and lip synced to the actor's voice, with the attraction containing a mix of interactive improvisation and a scripted progression.

A version of Mickey's Toon Elevator was in development by Imagineer Joe Garlington for Tokyo DisneySea's SS Columbia, but faced a logistical issue in the number of different actors that would be required to run the attraction with a sufficient throughput. As an alternative, Garlington began developing an interactive audience show starring Crush from the recently-released Finding Nemo; Crush was chosen since his brief appearance in the film and easily-mimicable voice provided a level of flexibility in portraying the character via improvisation. The pitch was declined by Tokyo Disneyland's owner, The Oriental Land Company. The attraction was instead slated for Epcot's The Living Seas pavilion–which was beginning to receive a Finding Nemo-themed retheme–as Turtle Talk with Crush.

It initially occupied Module 1C of the building. With the show's popularity and the completion of the retheme, Turtle Talk later moved to what was formerly the second pre-show theater, allowing for an expanded capacity, and Module 1A to be repurposed as a dedicated queue area. After its debut, the attraction was updated to include cameo appearances by other Finding Nemo characters such as Dory. In 2016, the attraction was updated to include appearances by Crush's son Squirt, as well as Bailey, Destiny, and Hank from the sequel Finding Dory.

== Technology ==
The "Window to the Pacific" is a large rear-projection screen portraying an animated undersea environment. The animated image of Crush is a computer graphic avatar controlled by a puppet, operated by a backstage actor/puppeteer whose performance is digitized in real time. Crush's movements and voice-activated lip synch are rendered in real-time and are projected at 60 frames per second, so that the turtle's mouth moves in synchronization with the actor's words. Digital puppetry techniques allow the puppeteer's movements to control the body motions of the projected turtle image. The technology enables each show to be different as Crush responds uniquely to each individual audience.

Using cameras mounted in the theater, the hidden actor can see the audience with whom he is interacting, and thus can refer to the specific appearance and behavior of particular questioners, as well as their location in the theatre. The actor's performance is a combination of semi-scripted banter and improvised responses to guests' questions and comments, delivered in a mimicry of the character voice from the film (originally performed by Andrew Stanton).

== See also ==
- List of Epcot attractions (which includes history timelines)
- List of Disney California Adventure attractions
- Stitch Encounter, a Disney attraction in non-American Disney resorts that also includes unscripted, real-time conversation between park guests and an animated character
- Monsters, Inc. Laugh Floor, a Disney attraction in Magic Kingdom at Walt Disney World that also includes real-time interactions between park guests and animated characters
- Turtle Trek, a SeaWorld film projection theater
