= List of storms named Gil =

The name Gil has been used for nine tropical cyclones worldwide: eight in the East Pacific Ocean and one in the West Pacific Ocean.

In the East Pacific:

- Hurricane Gil (1983) – a Category 1 hurricane that skirted Hawaii as a tropical storm
- Hurricane Gil (1989) – a Category 1 hurricane that paralleled the coast of Mexico
- Tropical Storm Gil (1995) – briefly affected Mexico before moving out to sea
- Hurricane Gil (2001) – a Category 2 hurricane that did not affect land
- Tropical Storm Gil (2007) – weak storm that caused flooding in Mexico
- Hurricane Gil (2013) – a Category 1 hurricane that did not affect land
- Tropical Storm Gil (2019) – weak storm that did not affect land
- Hurricane Gil (2025) – a Category 1 hurricane that stayed at sea

In the West Pacific:

- Tropical Storm Gil (1998) (T9816, 25W) – made landfall in Thailand as a tropical depression

== See also ==
- Hurricane Saturday – a crossover television event in 1991, involving the sitcoms The Golden Girls, Empty Nest, and Nurses, that featured a fictional Hurricane Gil
- Tropical Storm Gilas (2003) – a West Pacific severe tropical storm internationally known as Tropical Storm Koni
