= Gill, Ludhiana =

Gill
- village
- Location in Punjab, India
- Coordinates: 30°50′46″N 75°51′44″E
- Country: India
- State: Punjab
- District: Ludhiana

Area
  - Total: 15.01 km^{2} (5.80 sq mi)

Population (2011)
  - Total: 28,884
  - Density: 1,924/km^{2} (4,984/sq mi)

Languages
  - Official: Punjabi
- Time zone: UTC+5:30 (IST)
- Postal code: 141116
- Vehicle registration: PB-10

Gill Pind is a large village in Ludhiana district in the Indian state of Punjab. The population was 15,062 at the 1999 Indian census.

== Geography ==
Gill Pind (village) is situated on Ludhiana to Maler Kotla Road. This village is in the south of Ludhiana. Approximately 1/4 area of Ludhiana is situated in Gill village land. The village has an area of 1,501 hectares (5.80 mi^{2}). The village has its own post office and railway station. This village is situated in Ludhiana-I block and Ludhiana West tehsil. It is just 8 km (5.0 mi) from the center of Ludhiana city. Gill Assembly (Halka Gill) is also named on Gill village.

== Demographics ==
There are approximately 4500 voters.

At the 2001 census, Gill had 15,062 inhabitants, of which 8,126 were male, and 6,936 were female. There were 2,892 households. The population was 9,426 at the 1991 census.

Inhabitants of Gill are mostly descendants of the Gill clan of Jatt.
