= List of Tokyo DisneySea attractions =

Tokyo DisneySea is a theme park in Urayasu, Chiba, Japan, just outside Tokyo. This is a list of current and past attractions – rides, shows, restaurants, and shops – that have appeared at the park. Character meets and atmosphere entertainment (e.g., roving musicians) are not listed. Also not listed are attractions from the neighboring Tokyo Disneyland.

== Mediterranean Harbor ==
- Fortress Explorations
- DisneySea Transit Steamer Line
- Venetian Gondolas
- Soaring: Fantastic Flight

== Mysterious Island ==
- Journey to the Center of the Earth
- 20,000 Leagues Under the Sea

== Mermaid Lagoon ==
=== Outdoor Section ===
- Flounder's Flying Fish Coaster
- Scuttle's Scooters

=== Indoor Section ===
- Jumpin' Jellyfish
- Blowfish Balloon Race
- The Whirlpool
- Ariel's Playground
- Mermaid Lagoon Theater
  - Ariel's Greeting Grotto

== Arabian Coast ==
- The Magic Lamp Theater
- Caravan Carousel
- Sindbad's Storybook Voyage
- Jasmine's Flying Carpets

=== Former Attractions ===
- Sindbad's Seven Voyages

== Lost River Delta ==
- Indiana Jones Adventure: Temple of the Crystal Skull
- Raging Spirits
- DisneySea Transit Steamer Line

== Port Discovery ==
- DisneySea Electric Railway
- Nemo & Friends SeaRider

=== Former attractions ===
- StormRider
- Aquatopia

== American Waterfront ==
- Toy Story Mania!
- Tower of Terror
- Big City Vehicles
- DisneySea Electric Railway
- Turtle Talk
- DisneySea Transit Steamer Line

== Fantasy Springs ==
=== Peter Pan's Never Land ===
- Peter Pan's Never Land Adventure
- Fairy Tinker Bell's Busy Buggies

=== Frozen Kingdom ===
- Anna and Elsa's Frozen Journey

=== Rapunzel's Forest ===
- Rapunzel's Lantern Festival
