= TDS =

TDS may refer to:

== Business and finance ==
- Tax Deducted at Source, in India
- Tenancy deposit scheme (England and Wales)
- Tenancy deposit schemes (Scotland)
- Telephone and Data Systems, a US company
  - TDS Telecom, a subsidiary
- Thompson Dorfman Sweatman, a law firm, Winnipeg, Canada

== Technology ==
- Tabular Data Stream, a computer protocol
- TeX Directory Structure, for TeX system files
- Transposition driven scheduling, in parallel computer systems
- Time-driven switching, in data communications
- Technical data sheet in CDMA technology
- An oscilloscope series by Tektronix

== Military ==
- Tonga Defence Services
- United States Army Trial Defense Service

== Science ==
- Ter die sumendum, a medical abbreviation for three times daily
- Thermal desorption spectroscopy, to observe molecules desorbed from a surface
- Tornado debris signature on weather radar
- Total dissolved solids in water
- Transderivational search or fuzzy search in psychology
- Testosterone deficiency syndrome

== Other uses ==
- The Daily Show, US TV program
- TopDrawerSoccer.com, a website
- Trump derangement syndrome, a pejorative term used to describe negative reactions to US President Donald Trump
- Tokyo DisneySea, Japan
- TDS Racing, a French auto racing team
- The Downward Spiral, a 1994 album by Nine Inch Nails

== See also ==
- TD (disambiguation)
