= Port Discovery =

Port Discovery may refer to:

- Port Discovery (Tokyo DisneySea), a themed land at Tokyo DisneySea
- Port Discovery (museum), a children's museum at the Inner Harbor in Baltimore, Maryland
- Port Discovery, Washington, George Vancouver's landing point on the Strait of Juan de Fuca
