= Touch Down =

Touch Down may refer to:

- "Touch Down" (song), by Stylo G, 2018
- "Touch Down", a song by Comus from To Keep from Crying, 1974
- "Touch Down", a song by Koda Kumi, a B-side of the single "Summer Trip", 2013
- "Touch Down", a song by KSI, 2017
- "Touch Down", a song by Show-Ya from Masquerade Show, 1985

== See also ==
- Touchdown (disambiguation)
