= Pooh's Hunny Hunt =

Trackless dark ride at Tokyo Disneyland

Tokyo Disneyland
- Area: Fantasyland
- Coordinates: 35.6318°N 139.8814°E
- Status: Operating
- Opening date: September 4, 2000
- Replaced: Skyway

Ride statistics
- Attraction type: Trackless dark ride
- Designer: Walt Disney Imagineering
- Theme: The Many Adventures of Winnie the Pooh
- Wheelchair accessible

Pooh's Hunny Hunt is a unique trackless dark ride located at Tokyo Disneyland. It is based on the 1977 Disney animated film The Many Adventures of Winnie the Pooh.

== History ==
After the rise in popularity of Walt Disney's film adaptation of Winnie-the-Pooh, Disney Imagineers made plans in the late 1970s for a Winnie the Pooh attraction at Disneyland's soon-to-be renovated Fantasyland. However, in 1983, when the renovated Fantasyland reopened, a Winnie the Pooh attraction was absent. Seven years later, during a period when the franchise was undergoing a resurgence in popularity, plans for a Winnie the Pooh attraction were approved at Walt Disney World. Planners used the existing structure of the Fantasyland attraction Mr. Toad's Wild Ride.

The next version of the attraction, different in configuration, was Pooh's Hunny Hunt, which opened in Tokyo Disneyland. Due to a closure of all of the Skyways at Disney Parks across the world, including Tokyo, a space was left where the Fantasyland Skyway station once stood. With a budget of over $130 million, and featuring a never-before-used 'trackless' ride technology, Pooh's Hunny Hunt opened in late 2000 to large crowds and praise by many Disney internet fansites. To date, the attraction continues to have some of the longest wait times of any attraction at the Tokyo Disneyland Resort.

== Ride-through ==
The queue for the ride zig-zags in front of the entrance, which is shaped like a giant story book. Once inside, the rest of the line is made up of the pages of the story book which tell various parts of the story. Guests then board big, five-seater honey pots. These honey pots travel through the ride in groups of three.

Upon leaving the station, and making a left into the ride, the Honey pots stop in a line in front of a short video which has Christopher Robin giving Pooh a balloon. The vehicles then enter a very large room themed to the blustery day. There are many sights in this room, and the vehicles take turns visiting the various scenes. Pooh is seen flying around on his balloon. Kanga and Roo, Eeyore, Owl, Rabbit, and Piglet are getting blown about the wind. As the vehicles unite to leave the room, Tigger bounces from the bushes.

The honey pots then enter a dark room with three screens surrounded by trees. A swarm of bees flies through all three before Tigger comes in and starts singing and bouncing. The entire room, the trees, and the honey pots then begin to bounce with Tigger as he bounces from screen to screen. He then jumps up into one of the trees and the swarm of bees reemerges. The honey pots then go backward down a hallway filled with branches with Tigger seen clinging to one with a beehive stuck to his head.

The honey pots enter Pooh's house, where he is seen asleep with the balloon next to him. As he mumbles, the balloon grows the ears and eyes of a heffalump and the entire room vanishes into a starfield. Pooh then floats up into the air.

The vehicles then enter Pooh's dream sequence filled with the Heffalumps and Woozles that Pooh dreams about. This room is by far the most vibrant as the honey pots dance in circles with each other to a jazzy Heffalump band as colored lights and disco balls spin throughout the room. In a mirror found in the room, a balloon-like Heffalump can be seen sucking up honey from a honey pot before deflating. A Woozle can also be seen lighting a cannon shaped like a honey pot. Pooh is also seen hanging onto a living hot air balloon with a honey pot-like basket trying to reach for a beehive. There are many vehicles (one of them has a Heffalump and Woozle family riding in it) in this room and whenever three enter, three leave. The leaving vehicles exit through the trunk of a giant Heffalump which contains a tunnel. The vehicles go down the tunnel backward as Pooh spins above with projections of Heffalumps and Woozles.

The last room the vehicles pass through is the Honey Tree, where Pooh is eating his fill while singing how much he loves honey amidst its scent. The narrator then explains that, while Pooh was dreaming, the wind blew Pooh and the balloon all the way up to the honey tree, where he woke up, and ate honey until he was full. The vehicles then pass a big, closed storybook of the adventure and then return to the unloading area.

== Ride system ==
Pooh's Hunny Hunt uses a trackless ride system developed by Walt Disney Imagineering. Although other trackless ride systems do exist on the market (such as ETF's Mystic Mover), Pooh's Hunny Hunt differs in that it uses an array of sensors as opposed to a dedicated wire embedded in the floor. A custom local positioning system (LPS; not to be confused with GPS) is used to manage these sensors. The patented control system works by directional data being relayed from a master control computer directly to the vehicles which are fashioned to resemble honey pots. This data is then used to move an individual honey pot car through a complicated matrix embedded within the actual floor tiles. Every few seconds, the master computer generates a random path and ‘steers’ the honey pot in real-time, so as the cars roll through the ride the vehicles are, in fact, being told where to go. Because this system is in real-time, they can maneuver accordingly in just fractions of a second. This also allows for spontaneous yet synchronized ‘honey pot choreography’ with groups of honey pots (as many as 8 in a single show scene) appearing to ‘dance’ with the others, often timed with ‘beats’ in the music. Due to limitless variations possible, each journey through the attraction is unique. Overall, Pooh's Hunny Hunt is reported to have had a budget of $130 million.

== Similar rides ==
Tokyo DisneySea, an amusement park adjacent to Tokyo Disneyland, features Aquatopia. That ride uses the same trackless technology as Pooh's Hunny Hunt; however, it runs in a shallow pool.

Disneyland, Magic Kingdom, Shanghai Disneyland and Hong Kong Disneyland all feature dark rides based on Pooh. These rides operate as The Many Adventures of Winnie the Pooh and feature a more traditional track-based dark ride system.

== See also ==
- The Many Adventures of Winnie the Pooh
- Ratatouille: L'Aventure Totalement Toquée de Rémy
- Star Wars: Rise of the Resistance
- Mickey & Minnie's Runaway Railway
