= Indiana Jones and the Temple of Peril =

Roller coaster at Disneyland Paris

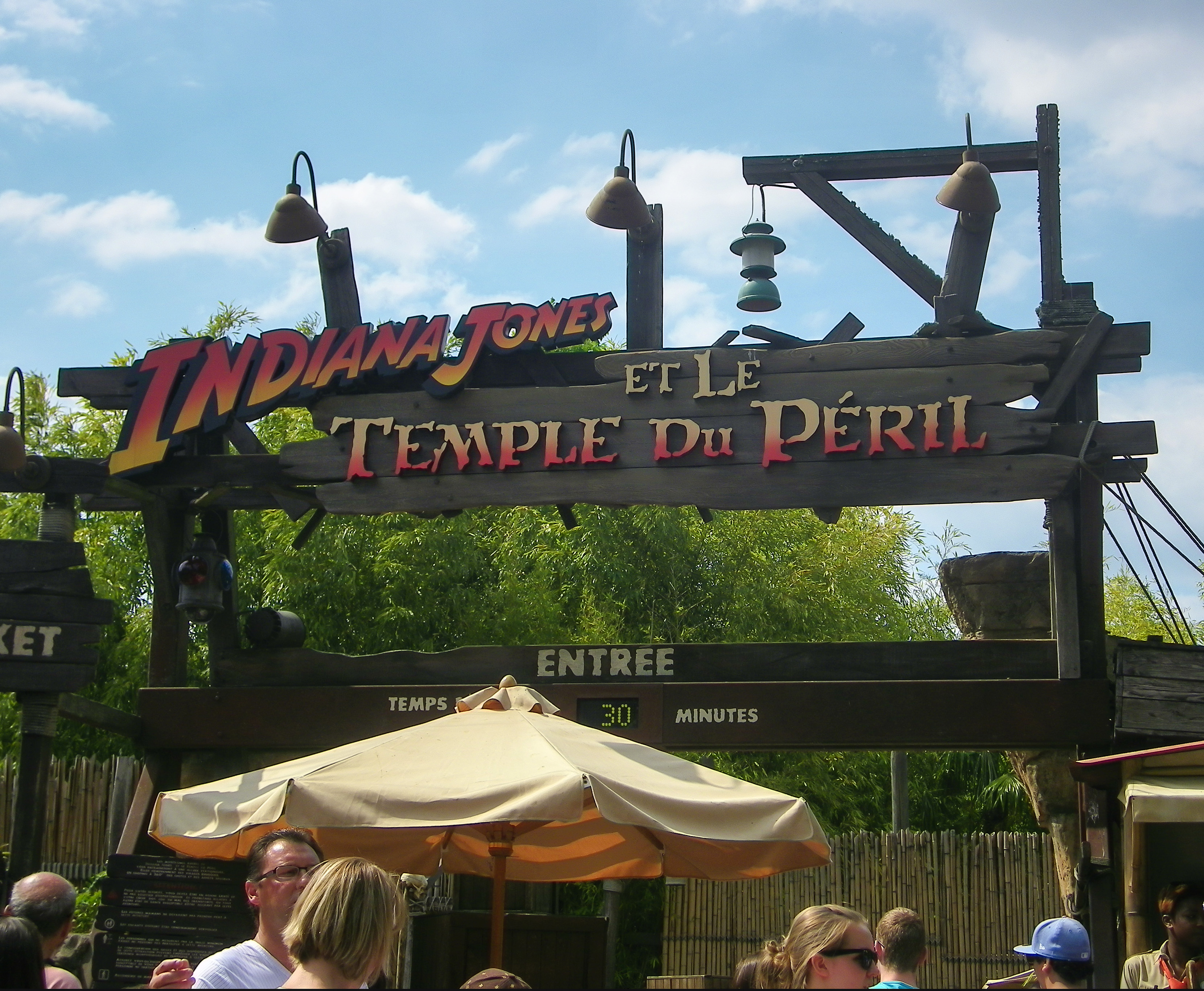

Disneyland Park (Paris)
- Location: Disneyland Park (Paris)
- Park section: Adventureland
- Coordinates: 48.8719°N 2.7719°E
- Status: Operating
- Opening date: 30 July 1993

General statistics
- Type: Steel
- Manufacturer: Intamin
- Designer: Walt Disney Imagineering
- Model: Looping Coaster
- Track layout: Pinfari TL-59
- Lift/launch system: Chain lift hill
- Height: 59 ft (18 m)
- Length: 600 m (2,000 ft)
- Speed: 36 mph (58 km/h)
- Inversions: 1
- Duration: 1:15
- Height restriction: 140 cm (4 ft 7 in)
- Trains: 7 trains with 2 cars. Riders are arranged 2 across in 3 rows for a total of 12 riders per train.
- Theme: Indiana Jones; Runaway Mine Train
- Website: Official website
- Must transfer from wheelchair
- Indiana Jones and the Temple of Peril at RCDB

Indiana Jones and the Temple of Peril (French: Indiana Jones et le Temple du Péril) is a roller coaster attraction at Disneyland Park (Paris). It opened on 30 July 1993. Based on the Indiana Jones films, guests are taken on an adventure riding in a mining train through a lost temple. The attraction was sponsored by Esso.

== History ==
Years before Indiana Jones et le Temple du Péril opened in 1993, an Indiana Jones themed attraction had been in development, but due to Euro Disney Resort's ongoing financial difficulties, the attraction was retooled.

Originally, guests would have been able to experience a full-scale Indiana Jones land-within-a-land, featuring a huge mine cart roller coaster based on the famous sequence from Indiana Jones and the Temple of Doom. The ride would have taken guests through wild jungles, around the lost temple and inside a large showbuilding for the mine chase scenes. Rumours often circulate of other attractions to have been included in the area, such as Disneyland's EMV (enhanced motion vehicle) Indiana Jones Adventure and a new Jungle Exploration attraction based on the classic Jungle Cruise.

Ultimately, the constrained budgets and requirement for a high-thrill attraction (at this point, Space Mountain was still 2–3 years away) brought the birth of Indiana Jones et le Temple du Péril, a looping coaster produced by Intamin of Switzerland. Giovanola is subcontractor. Despite lacking an indoor show building and the same scale as its "blue sky" predecessor, the final attraction stays true to the heavy theming of the original plans, with enough landscaping, winding paths and lush vegetation.

The Temple du Péril was the first roller coaster in a Disney theme park with an inversion. It also has the highest height requirement of any Disney theme park attraction worldwide, though it is no longer the most intense. The ride is recommended for riders size 55" (140 cm), presumably making it Disney's first thrill roller coaster for over size 50".

During the summer of 1993 (a few weeks after the opening), the emergency brakes locked on during a ride. Some people were hurt and the attraction was temporarily shut down for investigations.

Originally, torches were illuminating the stairway at night, but were removed in 2000.

=== 2000-2004 reconfiguration ===
Seeking a new attraction to market for their 2000 season and wanting to bring more interest back to the attraction, the Imagineers of Disneyland Paris embarked on an ambitious project to create Indiana Jones et le Temple du Péril: Backwards!.

In addition to removing the bodies of each train from their chassis and reversing them, the team added an extra two seats to each car, bringing the total for each two-car train from 8 to 12. Lighting and props had to be reversed throughout the ride to ensure guests did not see any signs of "backstage", and the track of the roller coaster itself even had to be altered and reprofiled at some points.

Since guests traveling backward are unaware of upcoming curves and drops, their bodies cannot prepare for the movement. This meant some of the sharper drops and curves had to be "softened" to make the attraction a smoother experience.

The reconfigured attraction reopened on 1 April 2000. On 27 November 2004, the attraction was "reversed" once more to return the trains to their original forward direction.

=== 2014 refurbishment ===
The ride was closed on 7 January 2014 for a major refurbishment, which includes partially demolishing and rebuilding the structure and track with more durable materials to keep the ride safe and secure. Rumours also suggested that the rebuilt attraction might have been slightly different from the original 1993 plans to make way for future rides at the resort. The ride reopened on May 28, 2014, and in the end remained identical to the original plans but with a slightly larger loop and structures designed with real stone.

== Design ==
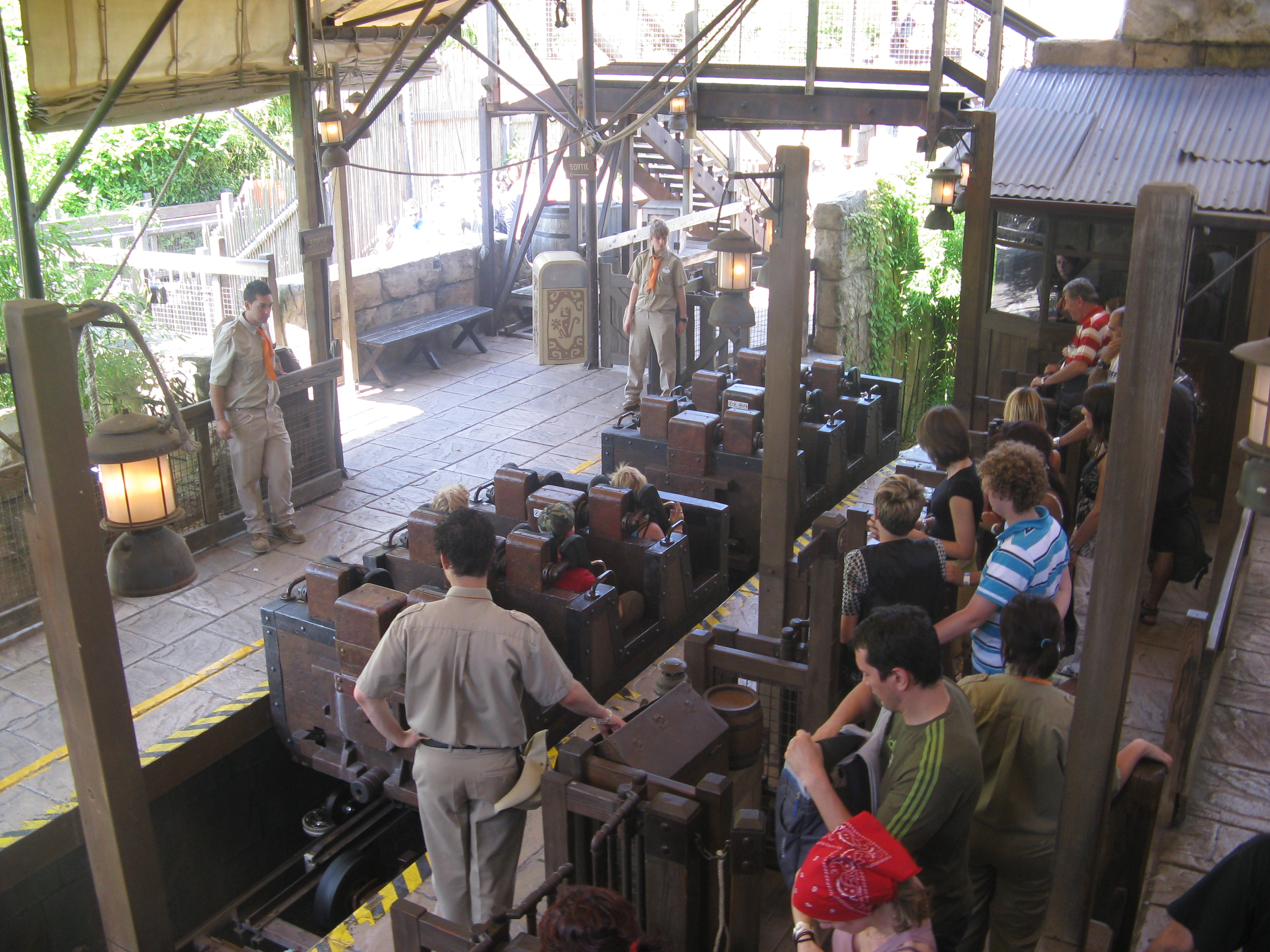
The loading station

The attraction is designed around the theme of an expedition to the lost Temple of Peril. The queue wanders through an abandoned base camp, meandering toward the temple where guests climb a staircase to the temple entrance. Inside the temple, guests board a mine car-styled ride vehicle.

According to Disney Imagineer Tony Baxter, "Temple du Péril is a traditional roller coaster attraction; the roller coaster cars, which are supposed to be mine cars, are going up and down over the surface of the temple, clearing debris or putting back the artifacts and so forth. It's a very simple little premise. Then the car seems to go out of control and upside down during its trip around the various temple pieces."

The track layout of the attraction is based on the layout of the first looping roller coaster built by the Pinfari company. Pinfari called this a TL-59, the TL stands for "The Loop" and the 59 is for the ride's 59m width. This Intamin version copies the course but uses a track style which is unique to Intamin.

The style and basic design of this attraction was used as the inspiration and basis for the Tokyo DisneySea coaster Raging Spirits.

== See also ==
- Indiana Jones Adventure
- Raging Spirits
- Indiana Jones Epic Stunt Spectacular!
