= Mysterious Island (Tokyo DisneySea) =

Themed land

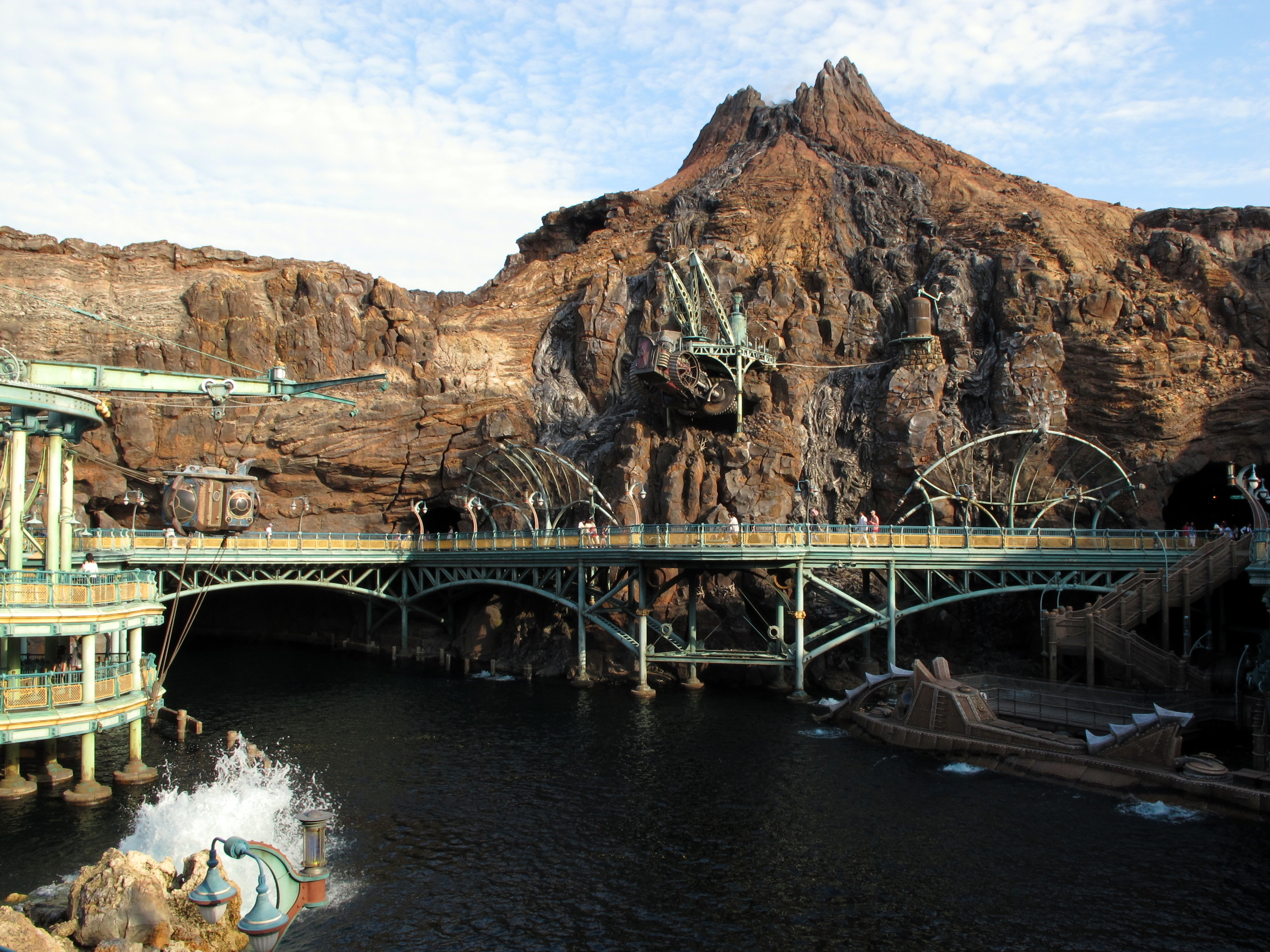
- Interactive map of Mysterious Island
- Theme: Jules Verne and Voyages extraordinaires

Attractions
- Total: 2
- Other rides: 2

Tokyo DisneySea
- Coordinates: 35°37′36″N 139°53′17″E
- Opened: September 4, 2001

Mysterious Island is a "port-of-call" (themed land) at Tokyo DisneySea in the Tokyo Disney Resort. It features a large volcano and is located in the center of the park.

== Theming ==
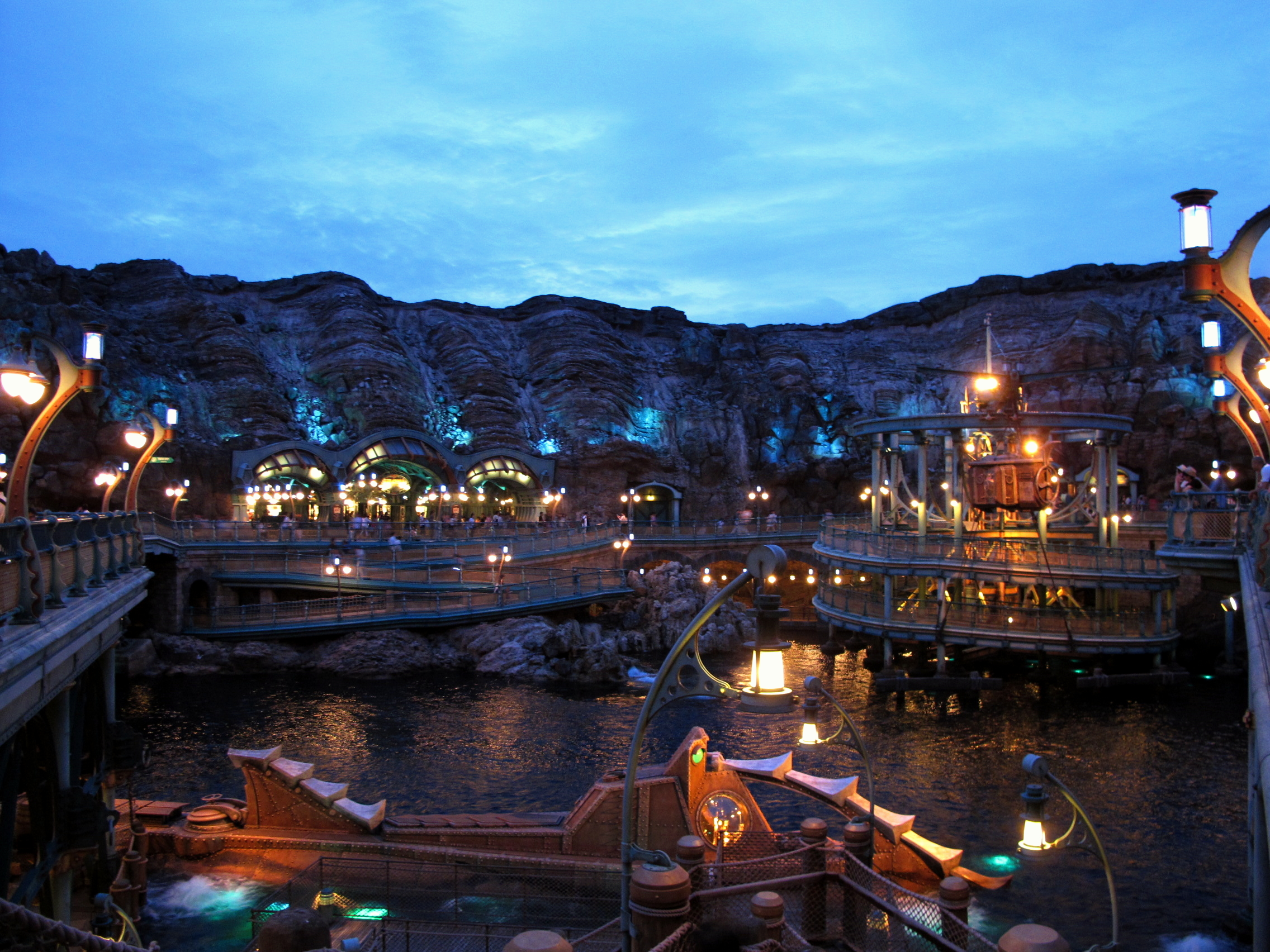
Mysterious Island

Mysterious Island is a recreation of the fictitious one in Jules Verne's 1875 novel, The Mysterious Island, which serves as Captain Nemo's lair. It is also known as Vulcania Island, as featured in the 1954 Disney movie 20,000 Leagues Under the Sea. When guests enter the area, they discover Nemo's secret base, complete with a harbor for his Nautilus, as well as a lab inside the volcano, known as Mount Prometheus. Nemo is exploring the depths of the sea and of the Earth, which allows guests to experience two of Verne's most famous adventures: Twenty Thousand Leagues Under the Seas and Journey to the Center of the Earth.

Despite its name, Mysterious Island is not an actual island. It is instead built into the side of Mount Prometheus. This volcano is "active" (bursts of fire can be seen escaping from the top, bursts of steam from cracks in its side, and bursts of water from the lake). The area has some greenery, and is mostly rocks and ornaments (as one can see in the film).

== Attractions and entertainment ==
- Journey to the Center of the Earth
- 20,000 Leagues Under the Sea

== Restaurants and refreshments ==
- Vulcania Restaurant - A counter-service restaurant that serves Chinese food inside of Mount Prometheus
- Nautilus Galley - A snack stand by the water
- Refreshment Station - A food stand that serves Chinese-style steamed buns with sausage filling

== Shopping ==
- Nautilus Gifts
