= StormRider =

Defunct simulator ride

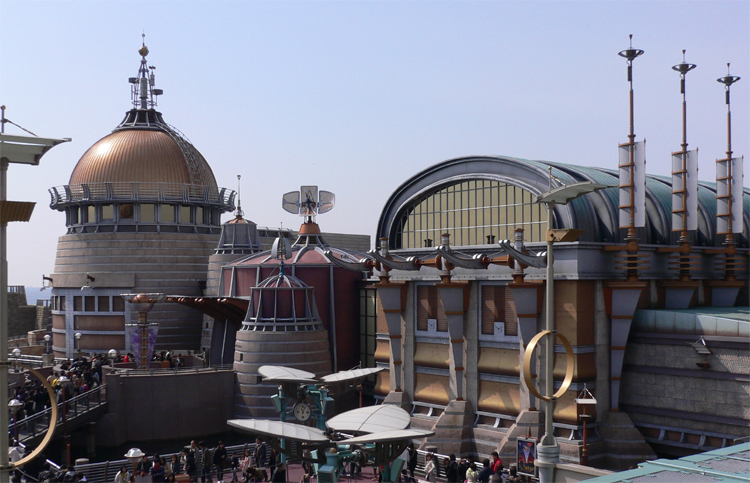
- StormRider's attraction building

Tokyo DisneySea
- Area: Port Discovery
- Coordinates: 35°37′30″N 139°52′57″E
- Status: Removed
- Opening date: September 4, 2001
- Closing date: May 16, 2016
- Replaced by: Nemo & Friends SeaRider

Ride statistics
- Attraction type: Simulator ride
- Designer: Walt Disney Imagineering
- Theme: Futuristic storm-diffusing aircraft
- Riders per vehicle: 122
- Duration: 14 minutes
- Height restriction: 90 cm (2 ft 11 in)
- Sponsored by: JCB
- Disney's Fastpass was available

StormRider was a simulator ride at Tokyo DisneySea. It simulated going into a storm in a futuristic aircraft (a "StormRider") to dissipate it. The attraction opened on September 4, 2001, in the Port Discovery land of Tokyo DisneySea. The attraction closed on May 17, 2016, and was replaced by a new Finding Nemo/Finding Dory simulator ride called Nemo & Friends SeaRider.

== Ride ==
With its copper roofs and mechanical devices, the attraction building—the "Center for Weather Control"—was themed to a scientific laboratory, and perfectly fit in with the rest of Port Discovery's retrofuturistic architecture. After entering the show building, guests proceed to a pre-show room with a gigantic radar and a model of a strange device. A researcher on a podium explains the mission: a big storm is approaching Port Discovery, and guests must deploy a "Fuse" (a storm-dissipating device) into the storm's eye using a StormRider (a flying laboratory).

After a brief fuse demonstration, guests enter the hangar with StormRider vehicles. Boarding one of the two flying labs, they see their vehicle hovering outside upon opening the windshield cover, awaiting takeoff clearance. As they wait, guests enjoy views of Port Discovery's waters and the ocean beyond, with the other vehicle hovering ahead. Clearance is given and the flight is underway. The sensation of takeoff is exciting, accentuated by the view out the windshield as Hydra 7, a floating city quickly disappears beneath the vehicle.

Nearing the huge, dark storm, it is clear to see that this is not just any average weather disturbance — this is the storm of the century, the greatest challenge for the StormRider pilots, and possibly, the most deadly. A lightning strike incapacitates the other StormRider, forcing it to return to base. Despite orders for the StormRider with the guests to also return, Captain Davis, feeling within striking distance of the storm, ignores the order and continues. However, the Fuse malfunctions, puncturing the ship's hull. After detonating the storm, the true thrill of Stormrider unfolds—a white-knuckle race against time to safely return to Port Discovery.

The Stormrider makes a splash landing, stabilizes, and the windshield closes, signaling the mission's end. Guests then exit the cabin and walk outside.

== See also ==
- List of Tokyo DisneySea attractions
