= TD =

TD, Td, or td may refer to:

== Arts, entertainment, and media ==
=== Games and toys ===
- Tails Doll
- Toon Disney
- Tech Deck, a type of fingerboard
- Ten Desires, the thirteenth official game in the Touhou series
- Test Drive (1987 video game), a driving simulation game
- Total Distortion, a 1995 computer/mac adventure game
- Touchdown (abbreviated as TD) a scoring play in gridiron football
- Tournament director (chess) or Tournament controller, the organizer and arbiter of a tournament, responsible for enforcing the tournament rules and the laws of chess
- Tournament director (poker), the individual charged with running a poker tournament
- Tournament director, in duplicate bridge
- Tower defense, a genre of video games in which players repel enemies by strategically placing defensive towers
- Tower Dream, a Super Famicom video game
- Toronto Defiant, an Overwatch League team

=== Music ===
- Tangerine Dream, a seminal German krautrock group
- Team Dresch, an American punk rock band
- Tenacious D, a comedy rock duo
- Throwdown (band), American straight edge heavy metal band
- "T.D" (song), a song by Lil Yachty from the album Lil Boat 3

=== Television ===
- Telediario, a Spanish television newscast
- Three Delivery, an American anime series on Nicktoons Network
- Total Drama, a Canadian animated series

== Businesses and organizations ==
- Atlantis European Airways (IATA designator TD)
- Toronto-Dominion Bank (or TD Bank Group) a financial services group with several retail banking divisions, including:
  - TD Bank, N.A., its US consumer banking division
  - TD Canada Trust, its Canadian consumer banking division

== Government and law ==
- TD status ("Treaty national's dependent", or "Trade NAFTA dependent"), the immigration status of relatives of a Canadian or Mexican citizen working in the US under the NAFTA agreement
- Teachta Dála, a member of the lower house of Irish Parliament
- Trust deed (real estate), a deed wherein legal title in real property is transferred to a trustee
- United States Department of the Treasury

== People ==
- Terrell Davis, an NFL running back for the Denver Broncos

== Places ==
=== Buildings ===
==== Australia ====
- Telstra Dome, an Australian Football League venue

==== Canada ====
- TD Centre, corporate headquarters for the Toronto-Dominion Bank in Toronto, Ontario
- TD Coliseum, an indoor arena in Hamilton, Ontario
- TD Place Arena, an indoor arena in Ottawa, Ontario
- TD Place Stadium, a football stadium in Ottawa, Ontario
- TD Stadium, a football stadium in London, Ontario

==== United States ====
- TD Ameritrade Park Omaha, a baseball venue in Omaha, Nebraska
- TD Arena, an indoor arena in Charleston, South Carolina
- TD Ballpark, a baseball venue in Dunedin, Florida
- TD Bank Arts Centre, a theatre in Gloucester County, New Jersey
- TD Bank Ballpark, a baseball venue in Bridgewater, New Jersey
- TD Bank Sports Center, an indoor arena in Hamden, Connecticut
- TD Garden, an indoor arena in Boston, Massachusetts

=== Inhabited places ===
- Chad (ISO 2-letter country code TD)
- Guatemala (ITU prefix TD or TG)
- TD postcode area, UK
- Trinidad and Tobago (NATO 2-letter country code TD)

== Science and technology ==
=== Biology and medicine ===
- Tardive dyskinesia, iatrogenic diorder causing involuntary movements
- TD vaccine
- Tibial dyschondroplasia, a metabolic poultry disease
- Traveler's diarrhea
- Troland, a unit of retinal illuminance

=== Computing ===
- .td, top-level domain for Chad
- <td>, an HTML table cell delimiter tag
- Borland Turbo Debugger, a product to debug x86 software introduced in 1989
- Team Developer, a software development environment by Unify/Gupta

=== Meteorology ===
- Dew point, the temperature when saturation occurs (100% relative humidity)
- Tropical depression, a weather system which precedes a typhoon, cyclone or hurricane
- Tropical disturbance, a low pressure organization that is moderately likely to form to a tropical cyclone

=== Other uses in science and technology ===
- TD programme, a series of satellites launched by ESRO
- Technical drawing, a term used in the design process
- Temporal difference learning, a prediction method
- Terrestrial Dynamical time, an obsolete name for Terrestrial Time
- Thermal desorption, a technology that utilizes heat to increase the volatility of contaminants
- Todd class in topology, denoted Td or td
- Townsend (unit), a physical unit of reduced electric field

== Sports ==
- T. D. (mascot), an official mascot of the Miami Dolphins
- Technical decision, a result in boxing when a fight is stopped because of an accidental headbutt
- Touchdown, a means of scoring in Canadian and American football
- Trenton Devils, an ECHL ice hockey team formerly known as the Trenton Titans

== Transportation ==
- TD Midget, a T-type MG car manufactured in the UK between 1950 and 1953
- SJ T44 (also known as Td), a Swedish diesel-powered locomotive
- Tank destroyer, a type of armoured fighting vehicle
- Turbo-diesel, a diesel engine with turbocharger
- Touchdown (tango delta), an alternate term for landing
- Tobu Urban Park Line (railway line prefix TD)

== Other uses ==
- /r/The_Donald, an Internet forum on Reddit commonly abbreviated "T_D"
  - TheDonald.win, a successor forum
- Technical director, usually the most senior technical person within a software or theatrical company, or television studio
- Territorial Decoration, a decoration awarded for twelve years' service in the British Territorial Army
- Timothy Dwight College, a residential college at Yale University
- Tracking (dog), a technique in which dogs are trained to locate certain objects by using the object's scent, for a variety of purposes

== See also ==
- DT (disambiguation)
- Touchdown (disambiguation)
