= Aquatopia =

Defunct ride at Tokyo DisneySea

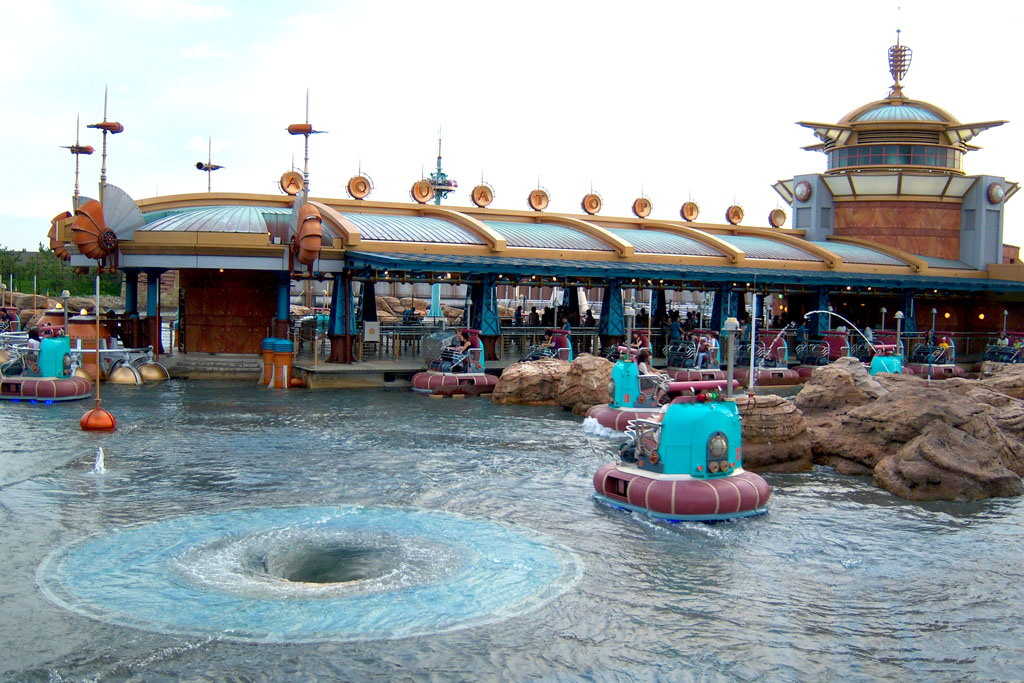
- Aquatopia as seen from the main avenue of Port Discovery

Tokyo DisneySea
- Area: Port Discovery
- Coordinates: 35°37′29″N 139°53′01″E
- Status: Removed
- Opening date: September 4, 2001
- Closing date: September 14, 2026

Ride statistics
- Attraction type: Trackless water ride
- Designer: Walt Disney Imagineering
- Vehicle type: Personal hovercraft
- Vehicles: 36

Aquatopia was an attraction at Tokyo DisneySea theme park at the Tokyo Disney Resort in Chiba, Japan. Located in the Port Discovery area of the park, it was the second attraction to use a trackless ride system designed by Walt Disney Imagineering (the first being Pooh's Hunny Hunt at neighboring park Tokyo Disneyland). The trackless ride system uses computers to guide the vehicles throughout the ride.

== History ==
It is considered to be the successor to both Disneyland's Motor Boat Cruise and the Autopia, from which Aquatopia received its name as homage. The ride consisted of around three dozen vehicles designed to look like personal hovercraft which moved independently from each other at quick speeds through a large water lagoon. The water in the lagoon was about 5 cm (2 inches) deep, as the vehicles actually rolled along the shallow floor on wheels. The water was kept moving to create the illusion of depth, and occasional funnel drains gave the appearance of foreboding whirlpools. Like the older attractions it was inspired by, Aquatopia is self-guided. Due to the ride technology, there were no visible tracks, giving the sensation of spontaneity and surprise to the attraction. There were two sides to the lagoon, which you board from a central boarding platform. During the summer, one side became a "wet course" while the other was the "dry course". The "wet course" added the possibility of getting soaked by hidden water jets along the ride while the "dry course" was jet-free.

On April 20, 2026, it was announced that the attraction would be temporarily closed on July 1, 2026 and make way for Aquatopia "Get Soaking'" Version as part of Tokyo Disney Resort: Summer Cool-Off and the attraction permanently closed on September 14, 2026 to make way for new attractions and more in Port Discovery at Tokyo DisneySea.
