= Port Discovery (Tokyo DisneySea) =

Themed land

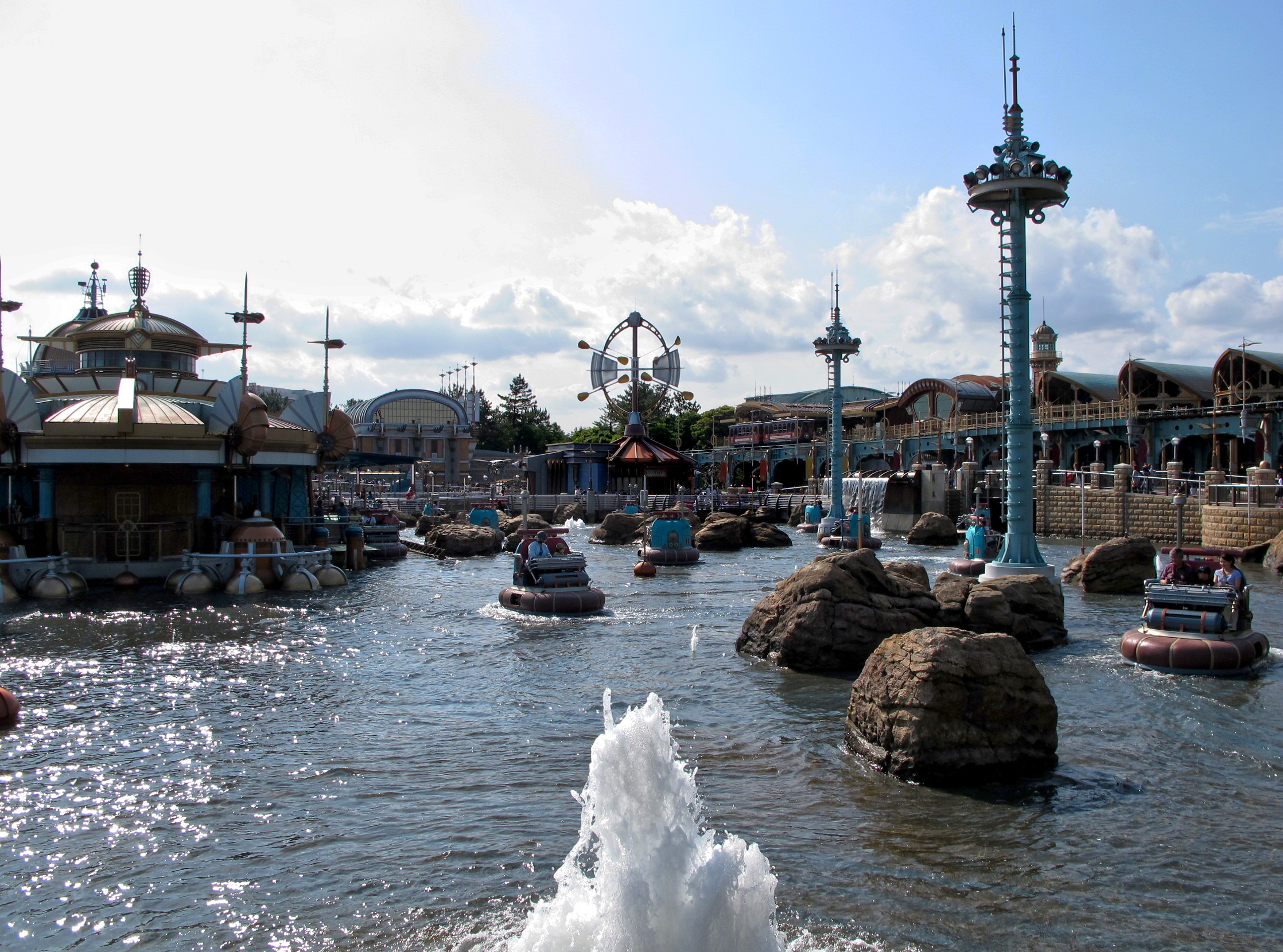
- Port Discovery's Attraction Aquatopia
- Interactive map of Port Discovery
- Theme: Future Marina

Attractions
- Total: 3
- Shows: 1

Tokyo DisneySea
- Coordinates: 35°37′31″N 139°53′00″E
- Status: Operating
- Opened: September 4, 2001

Port Discovery is a "port-of-call" (themed land) at Tokyo DisneySea in the Tokyo Disney Resort. It represents a "marina of the future".

On April 28, 2025, the Oriental Land Company announced that Aquatopia will be permanently closed on September 14, 2026 and replaced with new attractions and more in the section of Port Discovery at Tokyo DisneySea.

== Theming ==
Port Discovery is themed to a retrofuturistic research station inspired by the world of science fiction novels and films from the early 20th century. The area is home to two fictional societies, 'Center for Weather Control,' and later the 'Marine Life Institute' from Pixar's Finding Dory.

== Attractions and entertainment ==
=== Current ===
- DisneySea Electric Railway
  - Port Discovery Station
- Nemo & Friends SeaRider

=== Former ===
- StormRider (2001–2016)
- Aquatopia (2001–2026)

== Restaurants and refreshments ==
- Breezeway Bites
- Seaside Snacks
- Horizon Bay Restaurant

== Shopping ==
- Discovery Gifts
- Skywatcher Souvenirs
