= Raging Spirits =

Roller coaster

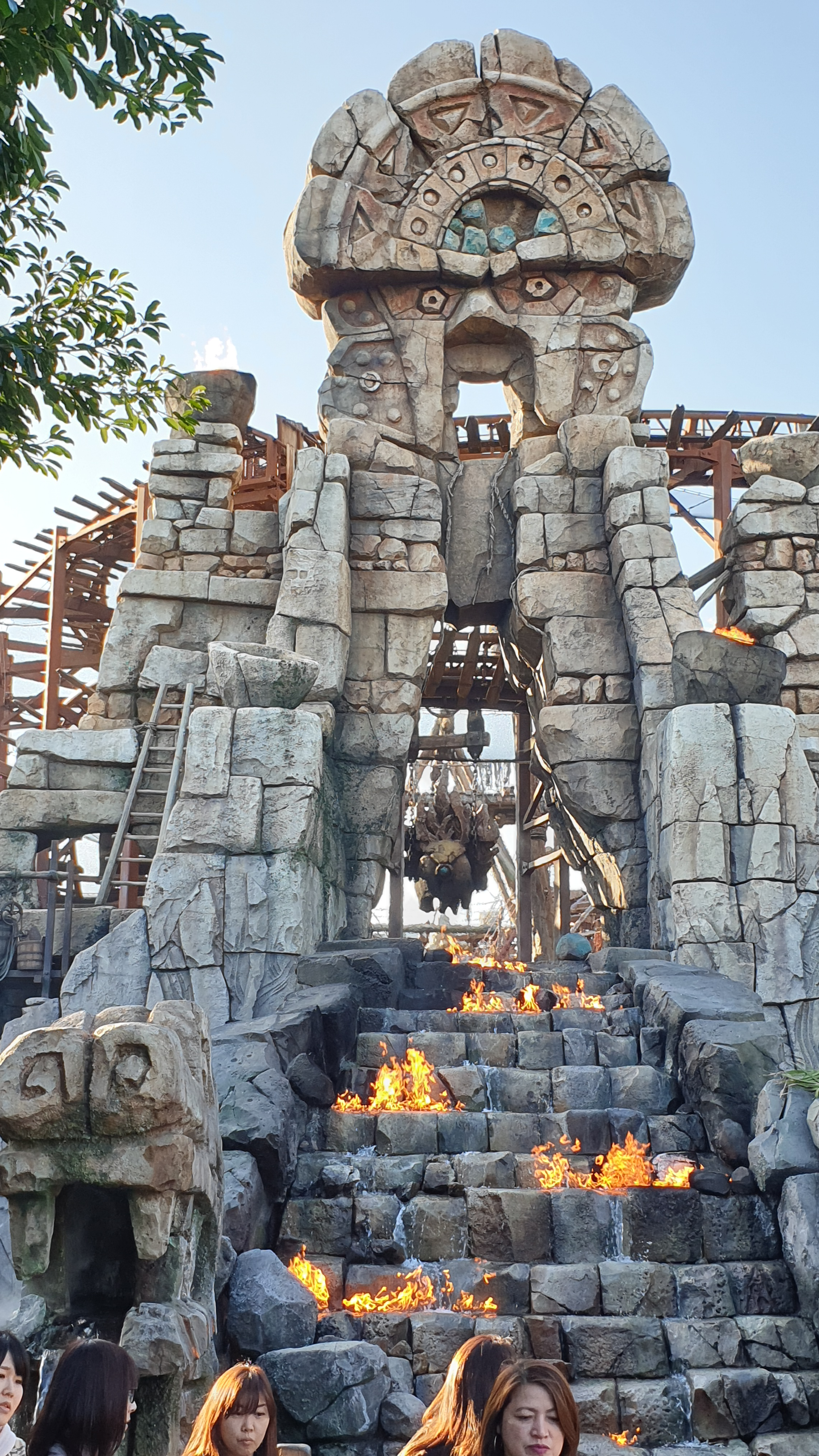

Tokyo DisneySea
- Location: Tokyo DisneySea
- Park section: Lost River Delta
- Coordinates: 35.627681°N 139.880760°E
- Status: Operating
- Opening date: 21 July 2005
- Cost: ¥8 billion

General statistics
- Type: Steel
- Manufacturer: Intamin
- Designer: Walt Disney Imagineering; Sansei Technologies
- Model: Intamin – Looping Coaster
- Length: 600 m (2,000 ft)
- Speed: 60 km/h (37 mph)
- Inversions: 1
- Duration: 1:38
- Height restriction: 117–195 cm (3 ft 10 in – 6 ft 5 in)
- Trains: 6 trains with 2 cars. Riders are arranged 2 across in 3 rows for a total of 12 riders per train.
- Disney Premier Access available
- Single rider line available
- Must transfer from wheelchair
- Raging Spirits at RCDB

Raging Spirits (レイジングスピリッツ) is a roller coaster at Tokyo DisneySea. The attraction began operation on July 21, 2005. Created by Walt Disney Imagineering, manufactured by Intamin and built by Sansei Technologies, the attraction takes guests on a thrilling, high-speed ride through the ruins of an ancient ceremonial site and its depictions of Incan buildings in the mountainous region of Peru. The attraction is located in Tokyo DisneySea's Lost River Delta section.

Much like the Indiana Jones et le Temple du Péril attraction at Disneyland Paris, on which the roller coaster design is based, guests riding Raging Spirits board hopper cars that propel them along tracks around the archeological excavation site.

This ride is the only attraction at Tokyo Disney Resort to feature an inversion, with its single vertical loop.

== Incidents ==
At around 4pm JST on May 28, 2012, a 34 year old man suffered a minor leg injury after trying to exit the roller coaster train while it was still in motion. He became alarmed when the train started to leave the station with his seat's safety restraining bar still up. As he attempted to exit the vehicle by stepping onto the platform, his right leg was dragged approximately 2 meters (about 6 feet) along the platform, causing the injury. Police investigators believed the safety bar did not engage because an employee temporarily unlocked the car's safety bars after finding one on an empty seat that was still up. Subsequently, the bar on the man's seat also unlocked, and as he failed to press down on the bar before the train started to move, the restraint did not deploy. Raging Spirits was closed until its safety could be confirmed. It was the first case of a rider injured on an attraction at Tokyo Disney Resort.
