= 20,000 Leagues Under the Sea (Tokyo DisneySea) =

Attraction in Japan

Coordinates: 35°37′35″N 139°53′05″E

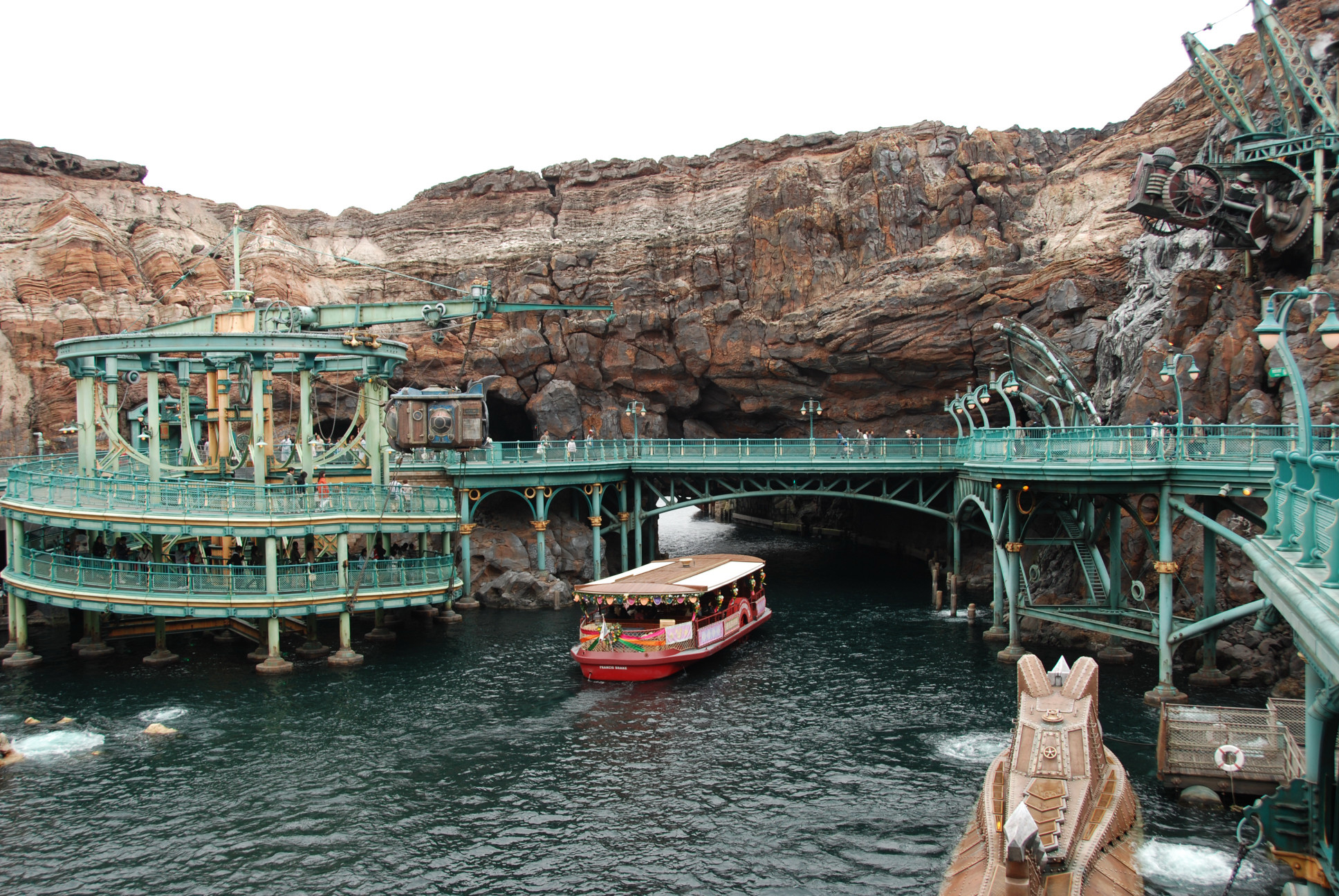

Tokyo DisneySea
- Area: Mysterious Island
- Status: Operating
- Opening date: September 4, 2001

Ride statistics
- Attraction type: Dark ride
- Designer: Walt Disney Imagineering
- Duration: about 5 minutes
- Sponsor: Coca-Cola (Japan) Company
- Disney Premier Access available
- Wheelchair accessible

20,000 Leagues Under the Sea (海底2万マイル) is an attraction at Tokyo DisneySea, based on Jules Verne's 1870 novel Twenty Thousand Leagues Under the Seas and Disney's 1954 film 20,000 Leagues Under the Sea.

== Story ==
Guests board a small submarine developed by Captain Nemo and participate in a tour to explore the world under the sea. This submarine was remotely controlled from the control base where Captain Nemo was, and it should have been secured by that. However, when he tried to make the submarine levitate, the submarine was attacked by the Kraken and lost control, resulting in a detour into an unknown world.

The place where the guests end up was a world of Atlantis where mermen live. They had evolved their own in a place close to the center of the Earth. The submarine was boosted by the mysterious power of the mermen, and was able to return to the base safely.

== Ride ==
This attraction's concept is similar to Disneyland's Submarine Voyage and Magic Kingdom's attraction 20,000 Leagues Under the Sea: Submarine Voyage. This ride does not go through real water; the movement and bubbles in the window are added effects.
