= Tokyo DisneySea =

Theme park in Chiba, Japan

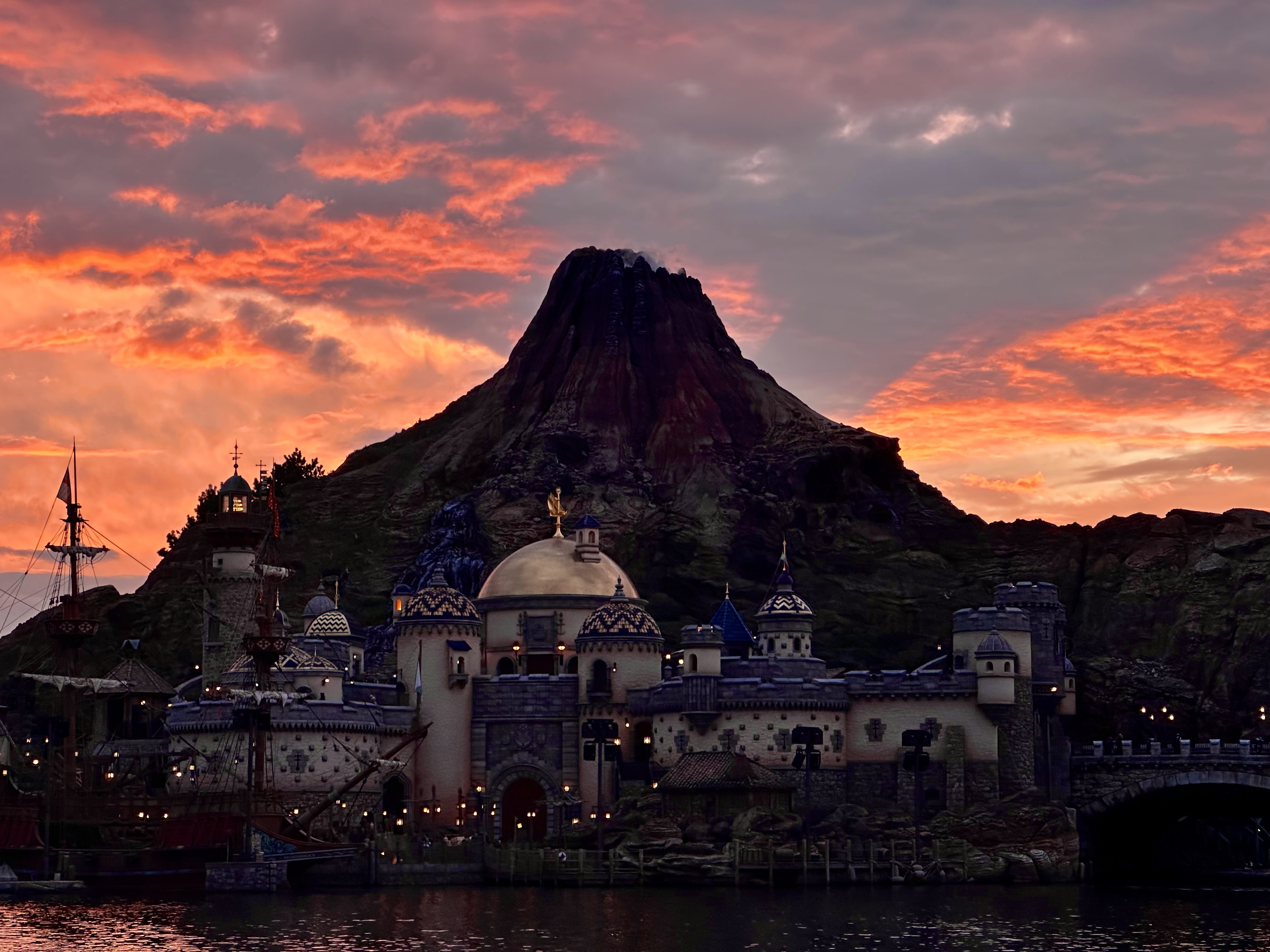
- Mount Prometheus, the park icon of Tokyo DisneySea
- Interactive map of Tokyo DisneySea
- Location: Tokyo Disney Resort, Urayasu, Chiba Prefecture, Japan
- Coordinates: 35°37′36″N 139°53′17″E
- Status: Operating
- Opened: 4 September 2001; 25 years ago
- Operated by: The Oriental Land Company
- Theme: Nautical, exploration and adventure
- Area: 150 acres (61 ha)
- Website: Tokyo DisneySea official website (English)

Tokyo DisneySea (東京ディズニーシー, Tōkyō DizunīShī) is a theme park at the Tokyo Disney Resort located in Urayasu, Chiba Prefecture, Japan, just next to Tokyo. It opened on 4 September 2001, at a cost of 335 billion yen. The Oriental Land Company owns the park and licenses intellectual property from the Walt Disney Company. In 2024, Tokyo DisneySea hosted 12.4 million visitors, making it the seventh-most visited theme park in the world and the third-most visited in Japan.

== History ==
Plans for a second Disney park in Tokyo were first conceived in 1987, the same period when the "Law for the Development of Comprehensive Resort Areas" was passed. Initially, these plans included a park similar to Disney's Hollywood Studios (then Disney-MGM Studios), to be called Disney Hollywood Studio Theme Park at Tokyo Disneyland. This idea was later reconsidered in 1991 because of the economic collapse caused by Japanese asset price bubble. During the creation of the park, the Walt Disney Company and the Oriental Land Company had to compromise on certain design elements of the park due to cultural differences, such as the park's entrance focal point. The idea for what eventually became DisneySea was traced to a proposal to build a second theme park in Southern California called "Port Disney" in Long Beach, California, with the RMS Queen Mary as the main attraction. The idea was scrapped after Disney endured financial trouble with the Euro Disney project. Later the idea was passed on to the Oriental Land Company to expand their resort.

Ground for DisneySea was broken on 22 October 1998 and the park opened on 4 September 2001. Upon opening, Tokyo DisneySea became the ninth park of the twelve worldwide Disney theme parks to open.

In 2002, Tokyo DisneySea won a Thea Award from the Themed Entertainment Association for the concept, design, and construction of the theme park. The award was presented at El Capitan Theatre in Hollywood, California.

In October 2019, both Tokyo Disneyland and DisneySea were temporarily closed due to the threat of Typhoon Hagibis. On 28 February 2020, Oriental Land announced a temporary closure of Tokyo Disneyland and DisneySea from 29 February to combat the COVID-19 pandemic. The closure, originally slated to expire in mid-March, was later extended twice, with the latest extension being until 1 July 2020.

== Park layout and attractions ==
The park has an overall nautical exploration motif, and originally opened with seven themed areas or "ports of call", although Disney characters and themed rides have since been added. The entrance to the park is Mediterranean Harbor, which opens up to six more nautically themed ports: American Waterfront, Lost River Delta, Port Discovery, Mermaid Lagoon, Arabian Coast, and Mysterious Island. Boats of the DisneySea Transit Steamer Line ferry passengers between Mediterranean Harbor and American Waterfront near the park entrance to Lost River Delta. An eighth port of call known as Fantasy Springs opened on 6 June 2024.

Areas of Tokyo DisneySea

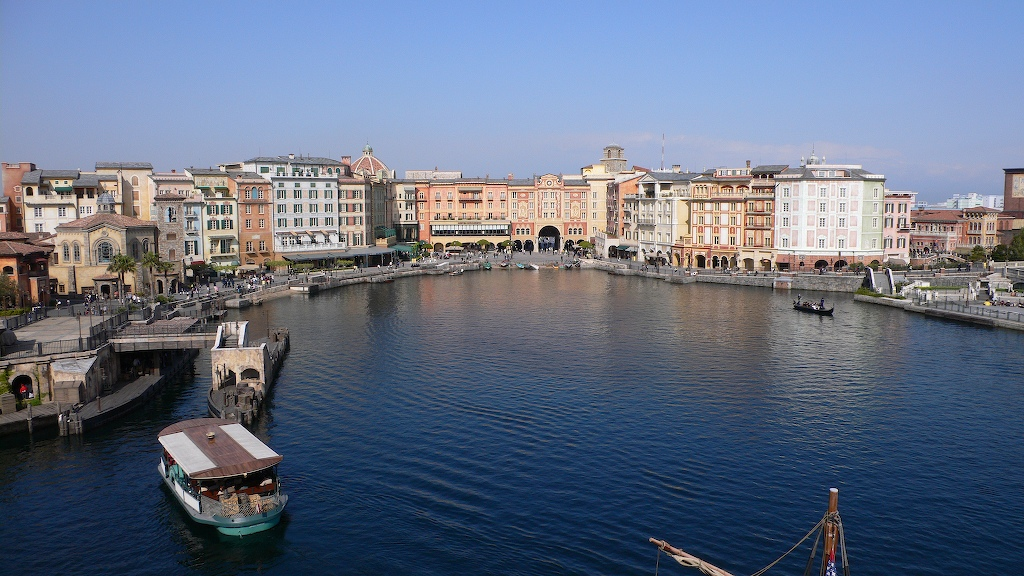
Mediterranean Harbor

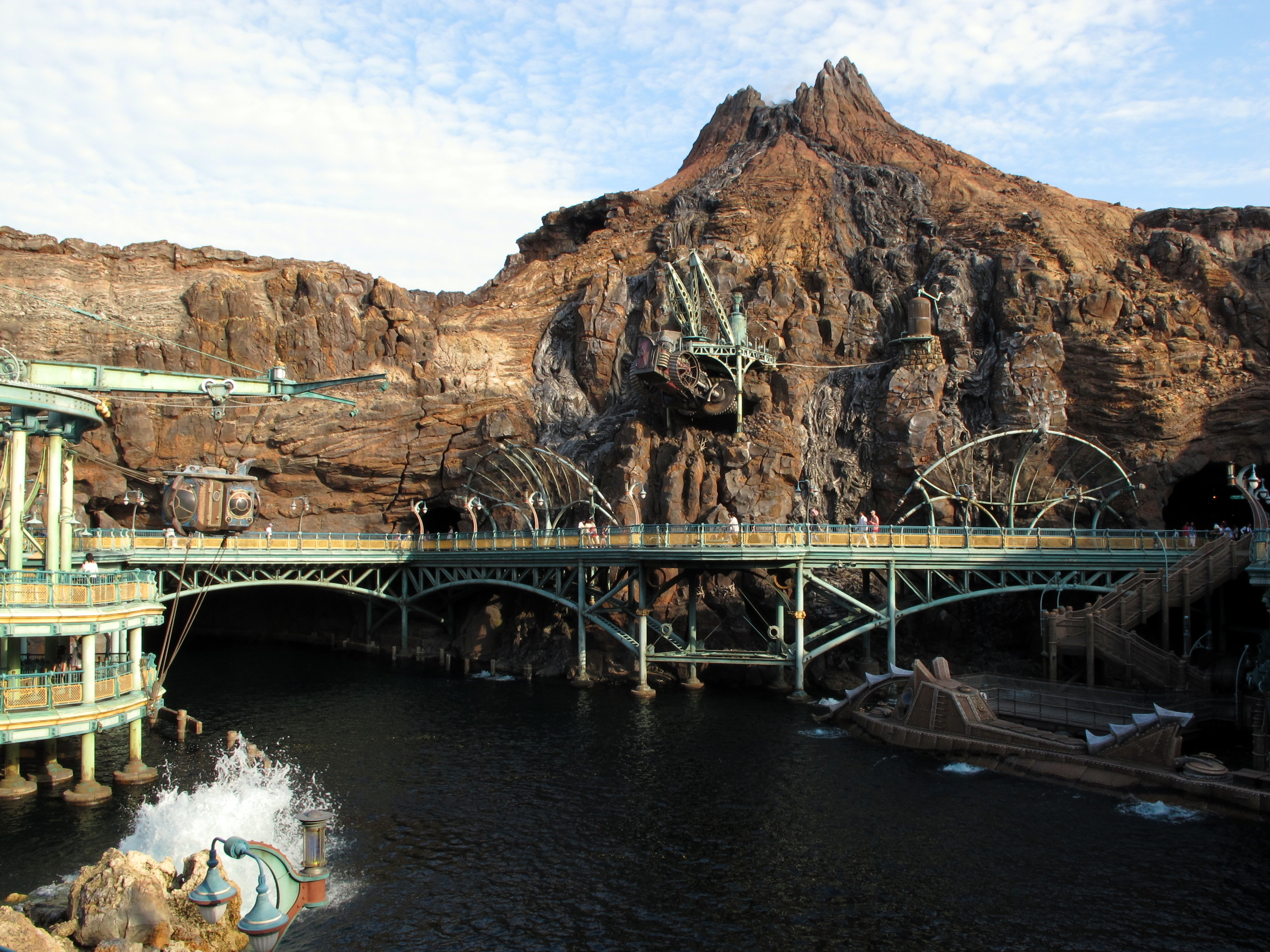
Mysterious Island
(Mount Prometheus)

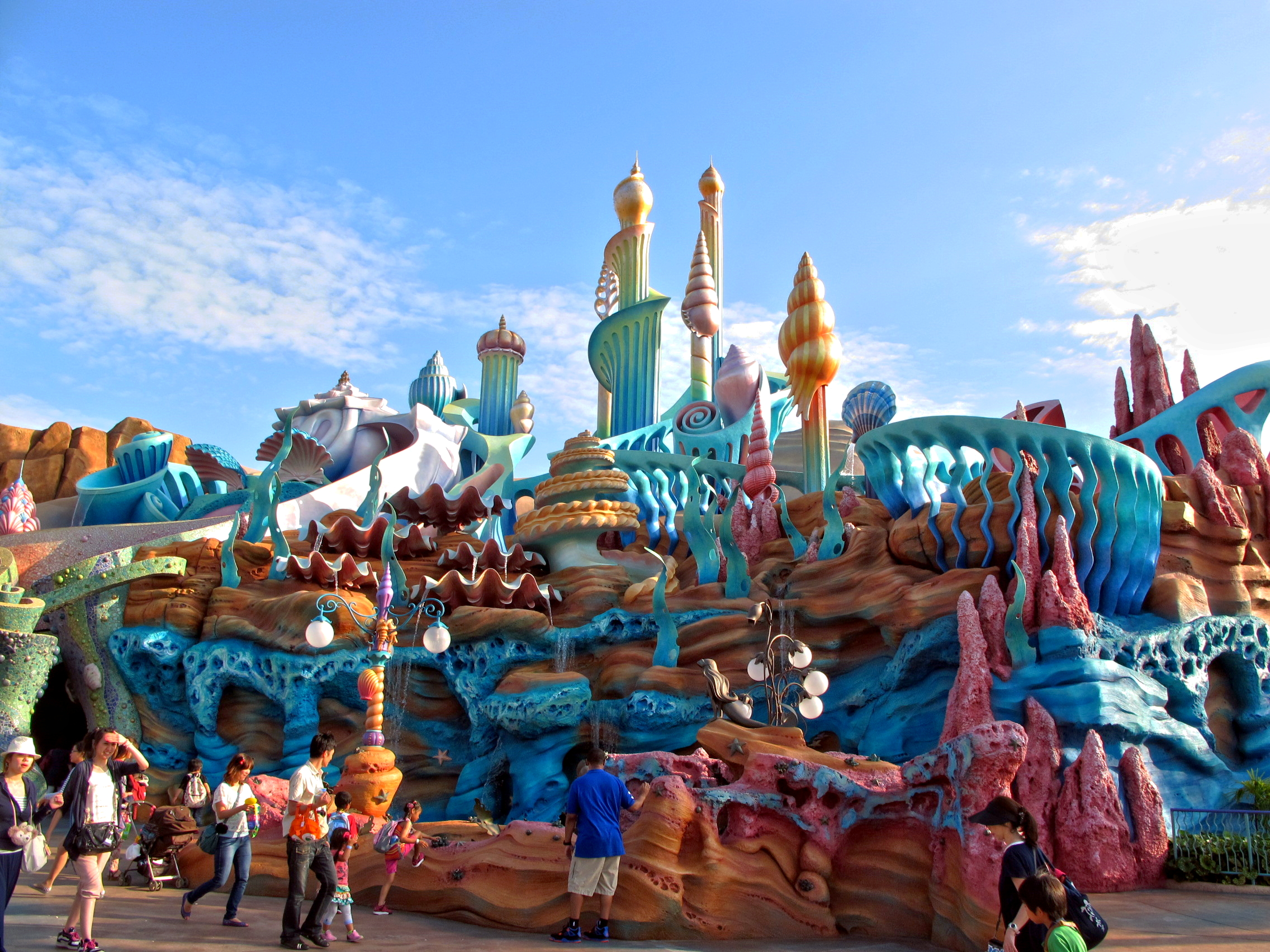
Mermaid Lagoon
(Exterior structure)

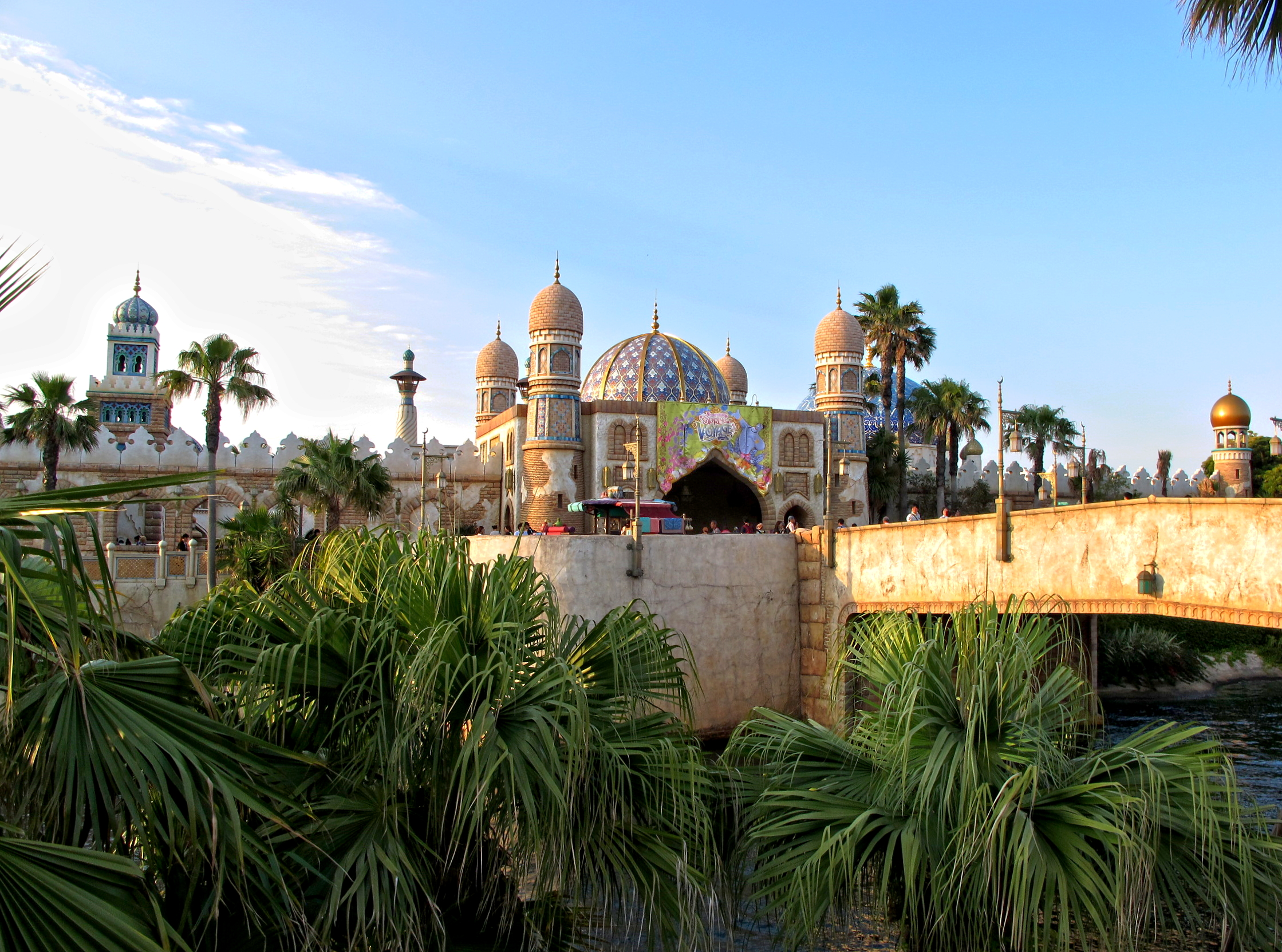
Arabian Coast
(Viewed from Mermaid Lagoon)

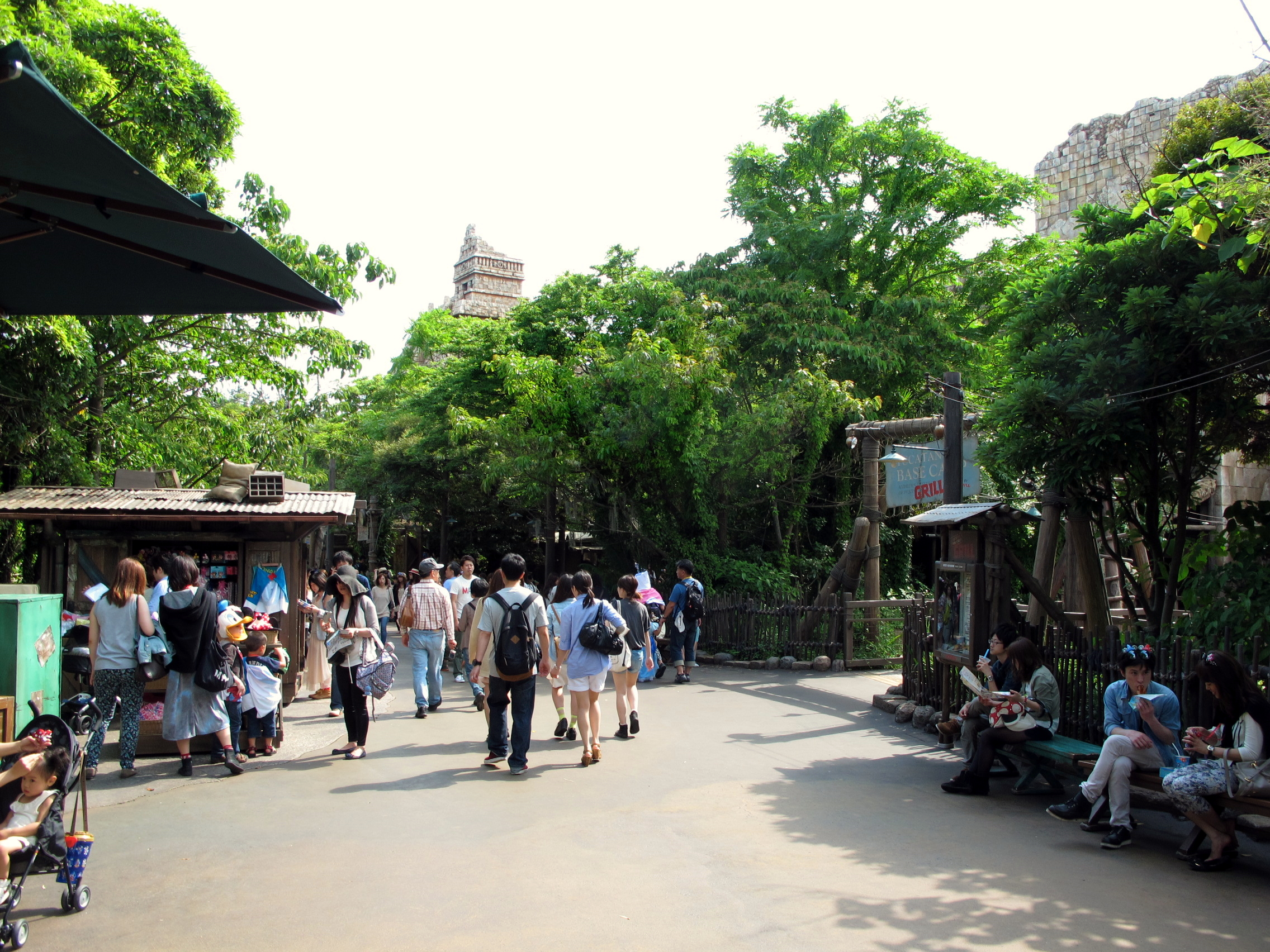
Lost River Delta
(Walkway by Raging Spirits)

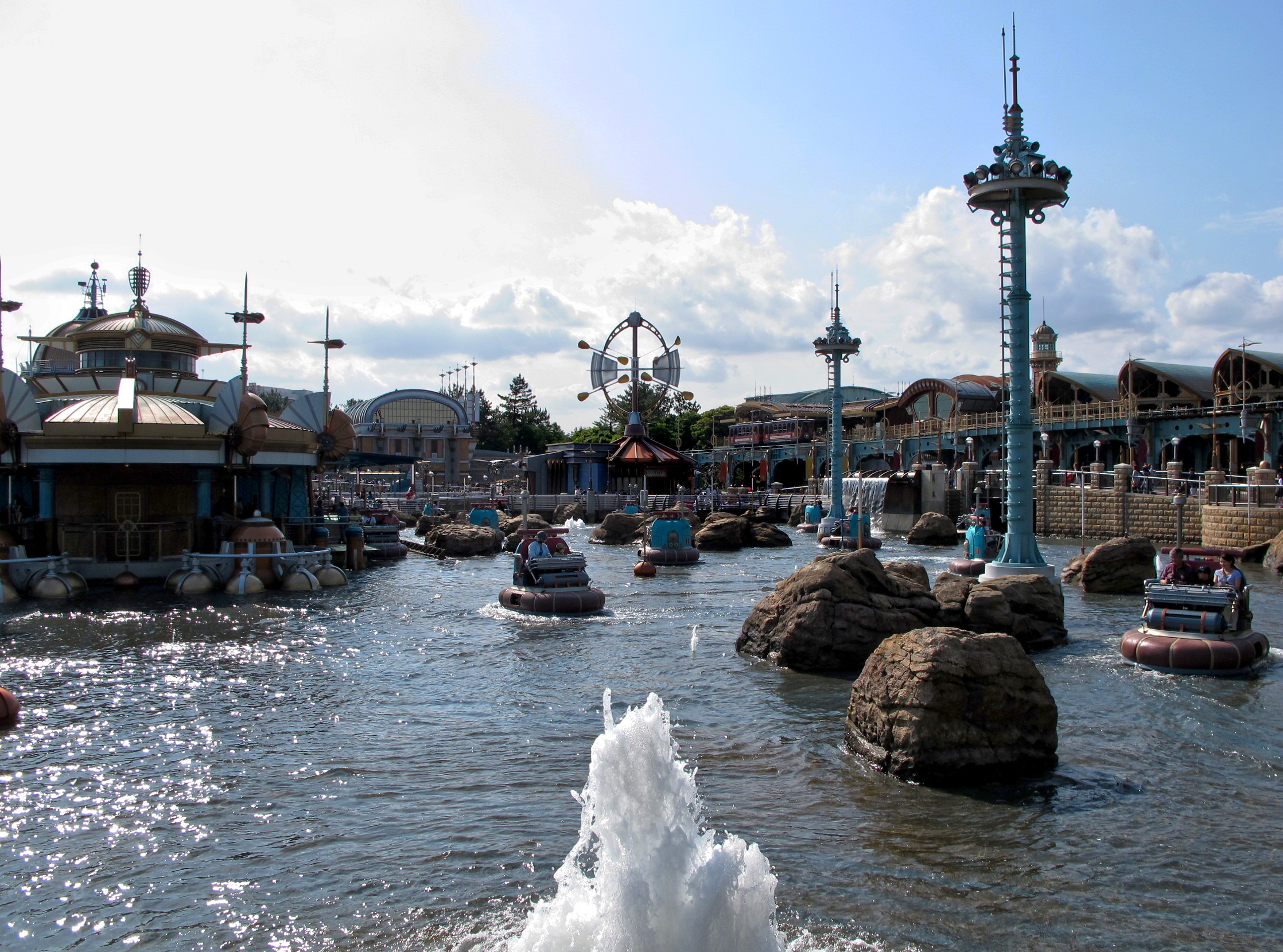
Port Discovery
(Aquatopia)

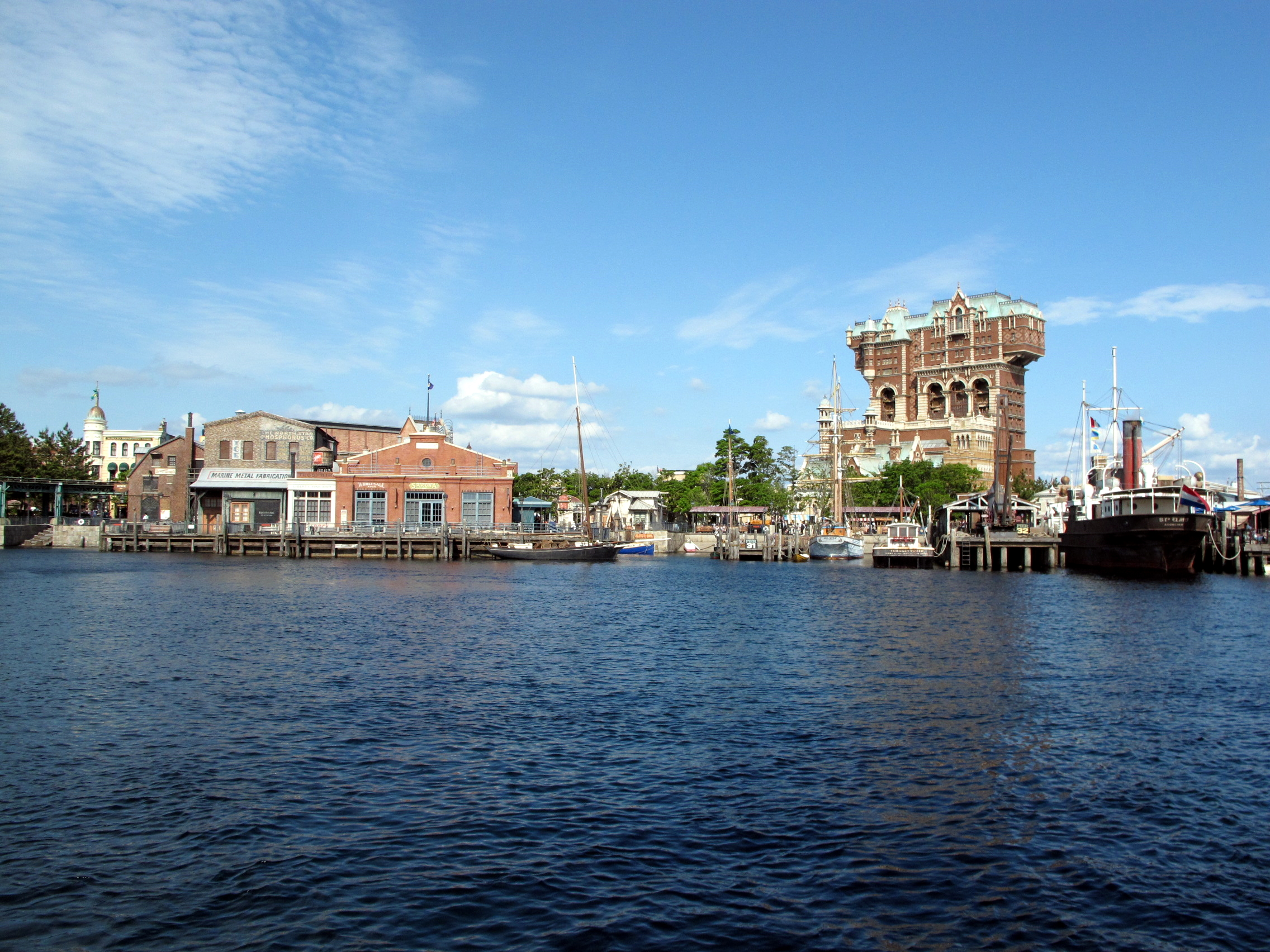
American Waterfront
(New York Harbor)

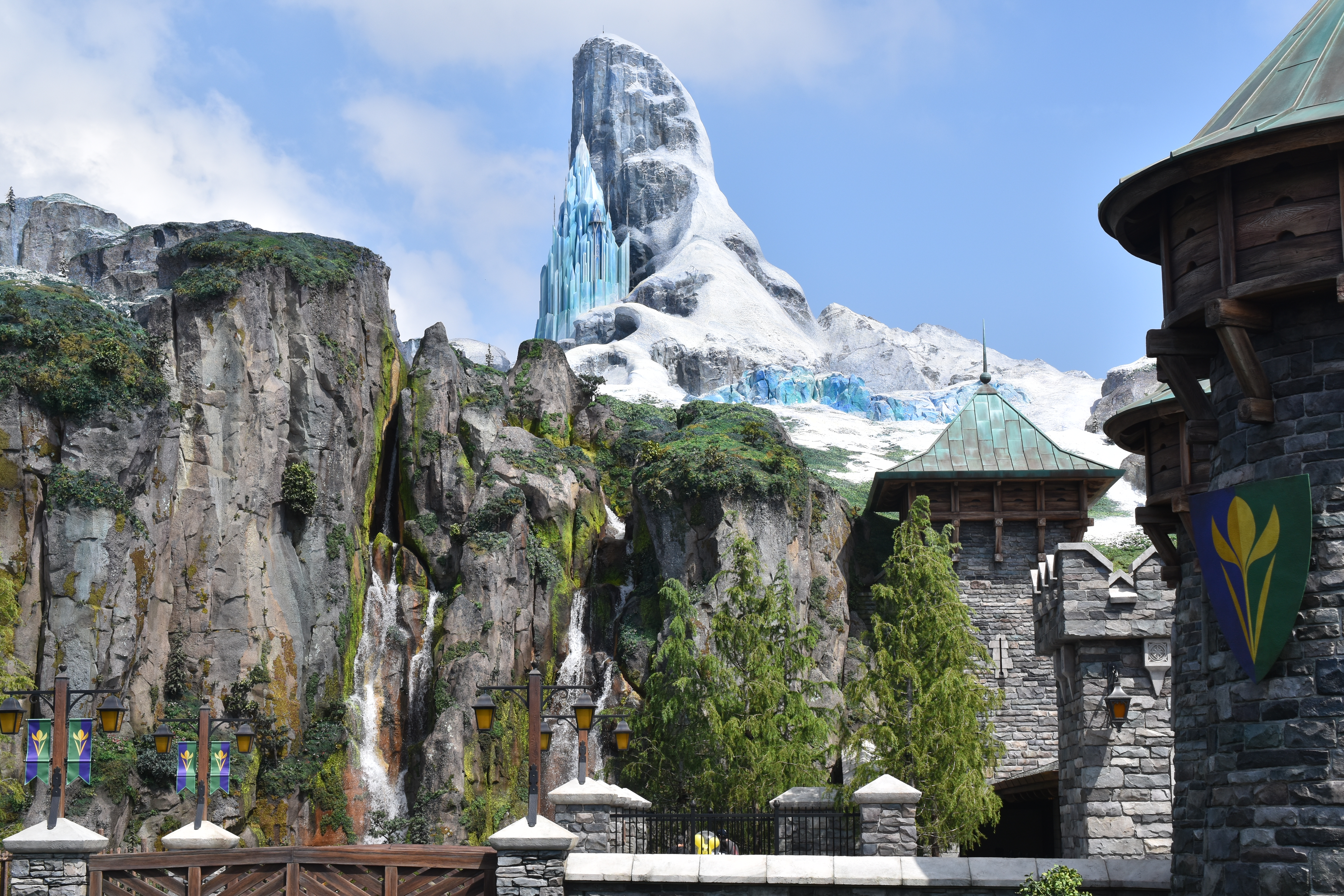
Fantasy Springs
(The Frozen Kingdom area of Fantasy Springs)

=== Mediterranean Harbor ===
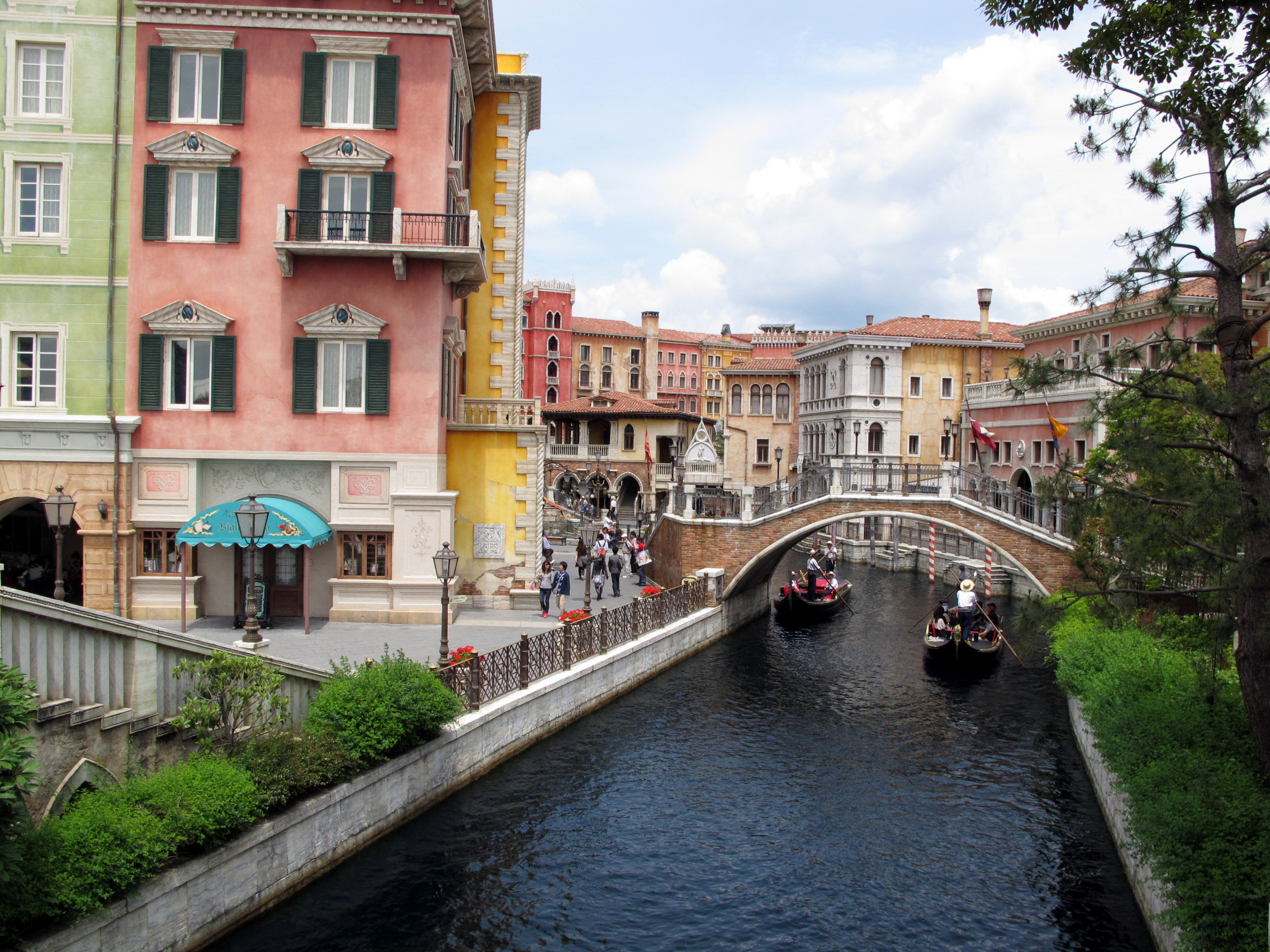
Re-creation of Venice at Mediterranean Harbor

Mediterranean Harbor is the entrance "port-of-call" and themed as an Italian port city, with Venetian Gondolas that guests can board and ride. Throughout the port are various shops and restaurants. Mediterranean Harbor's layout differs from the entry areas of other Disney parks as it is a large "V" shape rather than a main street that leads to a hub (as found in Disneyland's Main Street, U.S.A. or Disney's Hollywood Studios' Hollywood Boulevard). To the right, the path leads to Mysterious Island, and to the left, the path leads to the American Waterfront. Built into the architecture of the port is Tokyo DisneySea Hotel MiraCosta; the hotel serves as a full-scale reproduction of the various buildings of Portofino and Venice's ports and serves as the southern berm (or border) of the park. The design choice of combining a real hotel within the themed park areas helps to further the illusion that (as either a park or hotel guest) you are in an actual city; since the hotel is a functional building (rather than a 'set facade' -- the general standard in theme park designs) the effect of onlooking hotel guests, that may observe the park from hotel's rooms, balconies, and terraces serve in adding a level of kinetic authenticity in passing for an authentic Italian villa for park visitors, while the hotel guest enjoys the harborside views and novelty of location. Mediterranean Harbor also features Soaring: Fantastic Flight, a flying simulator, and Fortress Explorations, a large-scale interactive play area for guests that features exploration-themed activities and attractions.

=== Mysterious Island ===
Mysterious Island is a "port-of-call" within Mount Prometheus, the giant volcano that serves as the park's centerpiece and most prominent feature. It relies heavily on the storytelling of Jules Verne and, specifically, the mythology of the volcano fortress mentioned several times in the books called "Vulcania". The Mount Prometheus ride, Journey to the Center of the Earth, employs technology similar to Epcot's Test Track. The smallest "port of call", its two attractions are among the more popular: 20,000 Leagues Under the Sea, a dark ride, being the second. Despite its name, Mysterious Island is not an island; it is built into the side of Mount Prometheus, which is part of the show building for the two attractions. The architecture in this port is of Victorian style.

=== Mermaid Lagoon ===
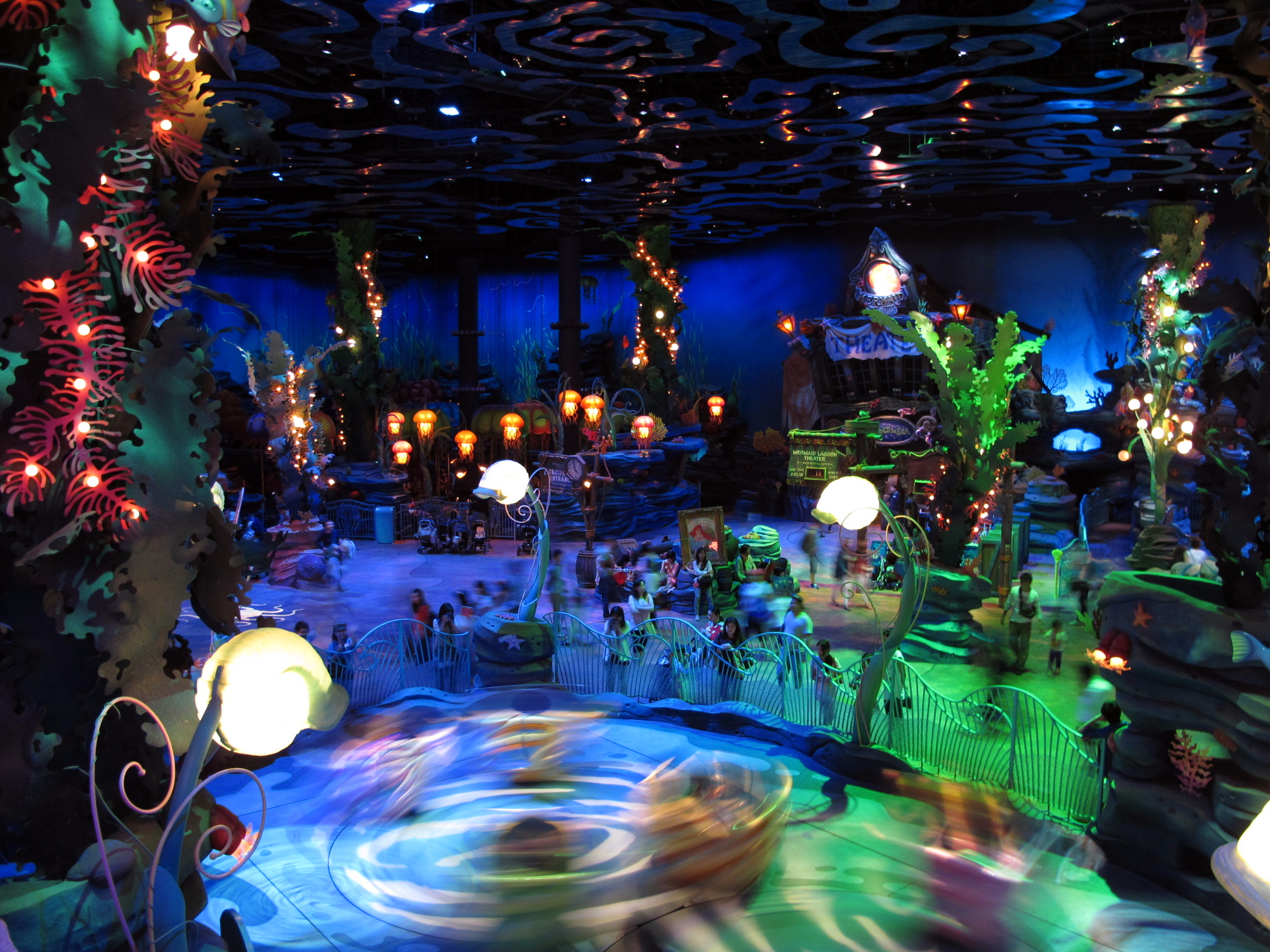
The interior of the building housing many of Mermaid Lagoon's attractions.

Mermaid Lagoon is home to the characters of The Little Mermaid. The façade is made to resemble King Triton's palace and features seashell-inspired architecture. This "port of call" is mostly indoors and illuminated with cool, dim lighting to recreate the feeling of being underwater. Attractions include Flounder's Flying Fish Coaster; Scuttle's Scooters; Jumpin' Jellyfish; Blowfish Balloon Race; The Whirlpool; all of which are children's rides. Also in this area are Ariel's Playground, which is a children's playground and extensive walk-through attraction that recreates the various settings in the movie; and the Mermaid Lagoon Theater, which formerly housed King Triton's Concert, a musical show featuring live actors, large-scale puppetry and Audio-Animatronics that recreate the story of The Little Mermaid.

=== Arabian Coast ===
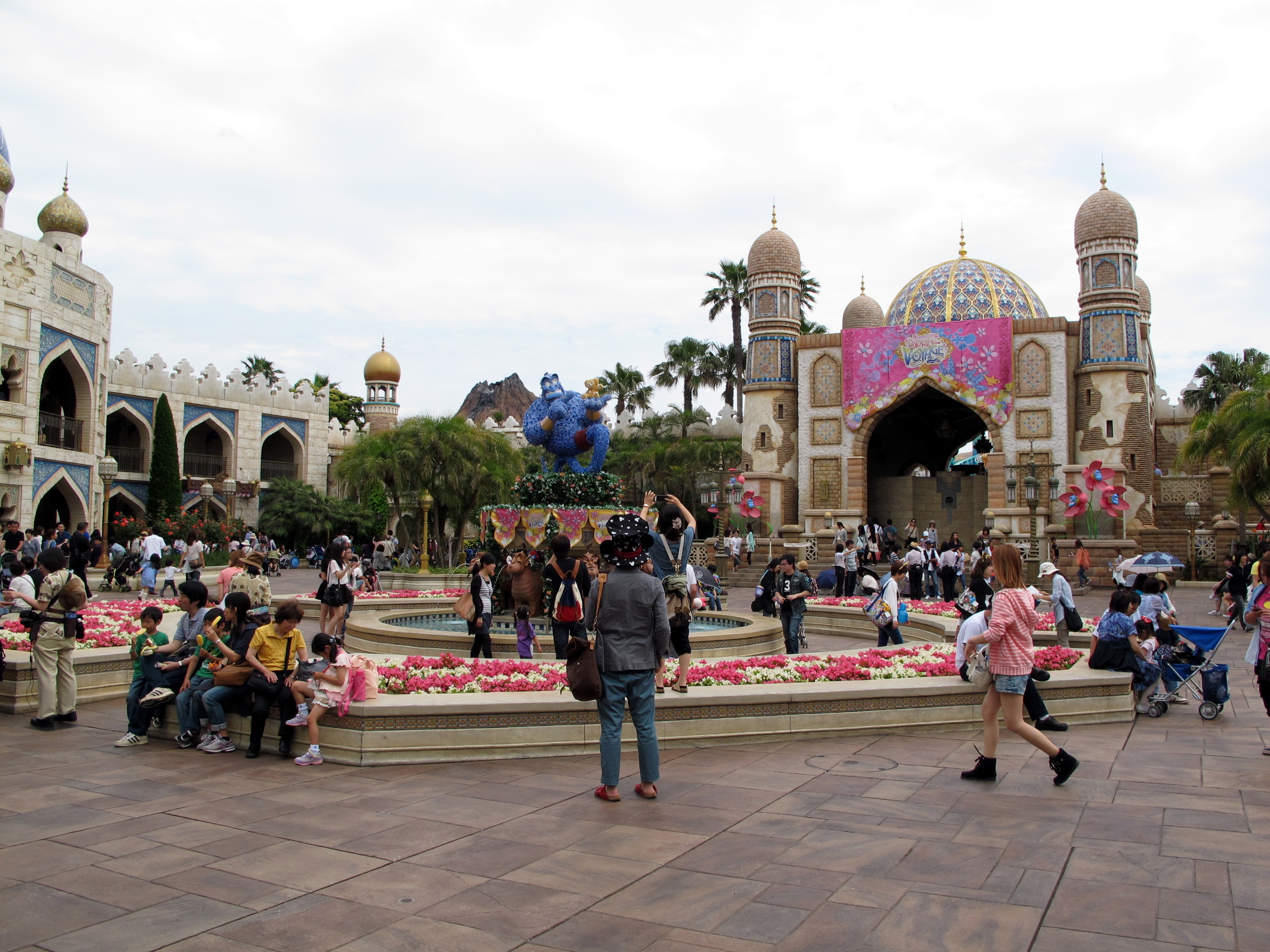
The main courtyard in Arabian Coast.

Themed after Aladdin, this area is inspired by an Arabian harbor and the "enchanted world from 1001 Arabian Nights". There are five attractions in the area: Sindbad's Storybook Voyage, an indoor dark ride boat ride whose art direction seems to be (at first glance) a variation on "It's a Small World" (with its own theme song, "Compass of your Heart", composed by Alan Menken); Caravan Carousel, a double-decker carousel that holds over 190 passengers; Jasmine's Flying Carpets; and the Magic Lamp Theater, which houses a combined live-action/animatronic based magic show with a 3D movie featuring the Genie.

=== Lost River Delta ===
Located at the rear of the park, the dominant structure in this "port of call" is the ruins of an ancient Mayan pyramid which houses the dark thrill ride, Indiana Jones Adventure: Temple of the Crystal Skull. Also in the Lost River Delta is the DisneySea Steamer Line which transports guests back to Mediterranean Harbor, Out of Shadowland, a live theatrical show that follows Mei, a young girl lost in a world of shadows who finds confidence and strength through her sojourn there. Furthermore, the Lost River Delta contains an Intamin roller coaster named Raging Spirits, which opened in 2005 and is similar to Indiana Jones et le Temple du Péril at Disneyland Park in Paris.

=== Port Discovery ===
This "port of call" is home to the fictional 'Marine Life Institute' and is themed in a retrofuturistic style; Port Discovery houses two attractions: Aquatopia, a boat ride that uses LPS tracking (the 'trackless' technology also used in Tokyo Disneyland's Pooh's Hunny Hunt) to move and spin through a lagoon amid waterfalls and whirlpools, and the 2 ft 6 in (762 mm) narrow gauge DisneySea Electric Railway, an overhead electric trolley that transports riders to and from the American Waterfront. On 12 May 2017, the area became home to Nemo & Friends SeaRider based on Finding Nemo/Finding Dory which replaced the former StormRider simulator.

=== American Waterfront ===
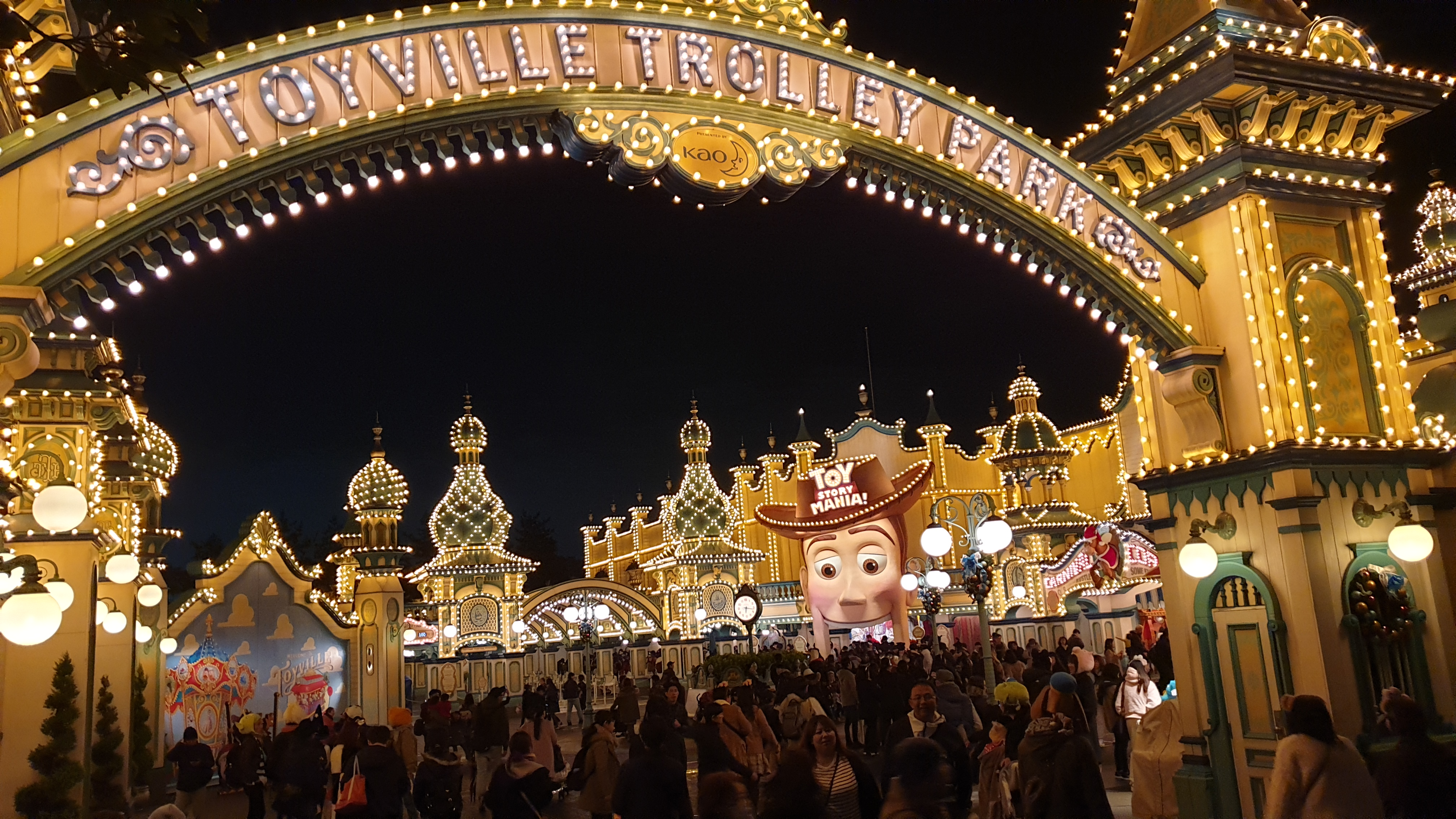
Toyville Trolley Park section of American Waterfront.

This "port of call" represents the northeastern seaboard of the United States in the early 20th century. It features two themed areas, an "Old Cape Cod" section, and a "New York Harbor" section. The area is dominated by a large passenger ship, SS Columbia, which is usually the site for various shows and events. Guests have the option of riding the area's "Big City Vehicles" which roam the streets of the area. It also features the 2 ft 6 in (762 mm) gauge DisneySea Electric Railway, which takes passengers from The American Waterfront to nearby Port Discovery. The port has a Broadway-themed theater which plays the show "Big Band Beat", which features 1940s-style swing jazz performed by a 12-piece band, as well as 20 singers/dancers. The port's most popular attraction is the Tower of Terror, an elaborately themed free-fall E-ticket ride.

Toy Story Mania is an interactive 4-D theme park attraction located at the American Waterfront in a new area called Toyville Trolley Park. It is inspired by Disney Pixar's Toy Story. The attraction opened on 9 July 2012. Guests wear 3-D glasses while riding spinning vehicles that travel through virtual environments based on classic carnival games. There are shooters on the vehicles to let guests to shoot targets in those 3-D games like "egg toss" and "balloon pop".

=== Fantasy Springs ===
The Oriental Land Company announced in June 2018, an eighth "port of call" named Fantasy Springs will be added. At an estimated construction cost of ¥320 billion it is the parks most expensive expansion so far. Furthermore, with a development area of approximately 1,506,947 square feet (140,000 square meters) it is also the park's largest expansion. Fantasy Springs comprises three areas themed to the films of Frozen, Tangled, and Peter Pan.

The expansion was originally scheduled to open in fiscal year 2023 (April 2023 to March 2024). However, in October 2022, the Oriental Land Company announced that "due to the extension of the project's construction period, which was impacted by delay in productions overseas, as well as restrictions placed on logistics and border measures to prevent the spread of COVID-19" the opening date of Fantasy Springs had been pushed back to 6 June 2024.

There are a total of four new attractions, three restaurants, and a new luxury hotel situated in the park itself. The entire area is connected to the existing park through a pathway between the ports of Lost River Delta and Arabian Coast.

The Frozen area features an attraction where guests can join Elsa and Anna on a journey through Arendelle on a boat ride. In the Tangled zone, visitors can try the Rapunzel's Lantern Festival, a boat ride through the annual lantern festival where Rapunzel falls in love with Flynn Rider. The Peter Pan area offers a new 3D immersive experience and Fairy Tinker Bell's Buggies, a slow ride to help Tinker Bell deliver parcels and packages to various locations in Pixie Hollow. The Fantasy Springs Hotel offers two types of accommodations: Grand Chateau and Fantasy Chateau. Guests at the Fantasy Springs Hotel are able to access the park via a dedicated entrance directly into the Fantasy Springs area, which combined with the "Happy Entry" (early park entry) program gives Fantasy Springs hotel guests unique access to this remote area of the park, long before other park guests can get there. There are six restaurants in the zone – Fantasy Springs Restaurant (which is jointly accessible either via the hotel or via the park), La Libellule, Oaken's OK Foods, Small Snack Shop, Lookout Cookout and Snuggly Duckling.

== Attendance ==
Tokyo DisneySea reached the milestone of 10 million guests in 307 days since its grand opening, which is a record among theme parks worldwide. The previous record-holder was Universal Studios Japan, 338 days after its opening.

2006	2007	2008	2009	2010	2011	2012	2013	2014	2015
12,100,000	12,413,000	12,498,000	12,004,000	12,663,000	11,930,000	12,656,000	14,084,000	14,100,000	13,600,000
2016	2017	2018	2019	2020	2021	2022	2023	2024	Worldwide rank (2024)
13,460,000	13,500,000	14,651,000	14,650,000	3,400,000	5,800,000	10,100,000	12,400,000	12,441,000	7

== See also ==
- List of Tokyo DisneySea attractions
- Rail transport in Walt Disney Parks and Resorts
