= Sindbad's Storybook Voyage =

Attraction at Tokyo DisneySea

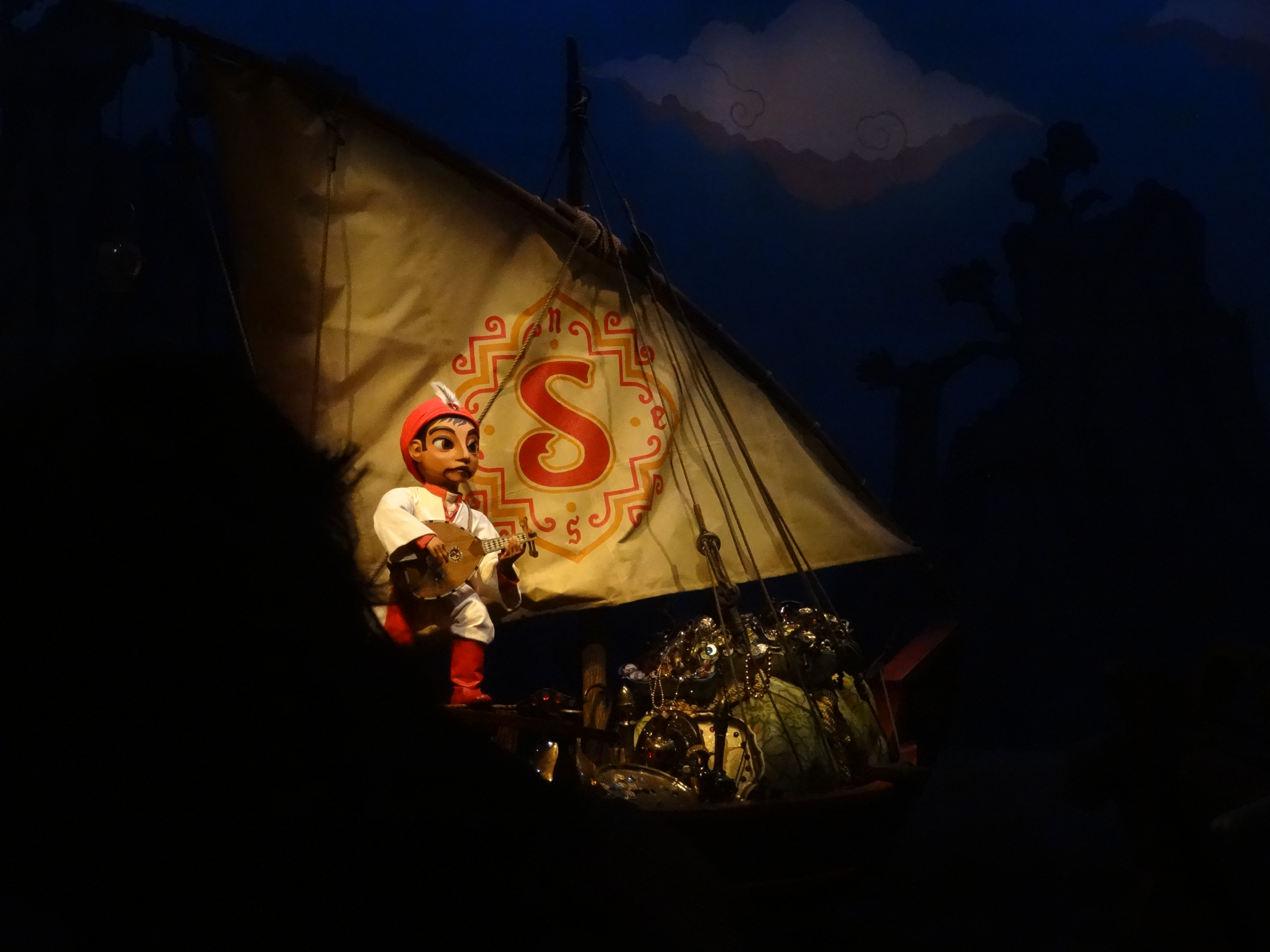

Tokyo DisneySea
- Area: Arabian Coast
- Coordinates: 35.6285°N 139.8810°E
- Status: Operating
- Opening date: September 4, 2001 (Tokyo DisneySea opening day attraction); March 29, 2007 (Current version)
- Closing date: September 29, 2006 (Original version)

Ride statistics
- Attraction type: Old Mill
- Vehicle type: Boats
- Riders per vehicle: 24
- Duration: about 10 minutes
- Sponsor: Nippon Express
- Previously known as: Sindbad's Seven Voyages (2001–2006)
- Must transfer from wheelchair

Sindbad's Storybook Voyage is a musical boat cruise dark ride at Tokyo DisneySea, inspired by the story of Sindbad the Sailor. The attraction features the song "Compass of Your Heart" composed by Alan Menken and sung by Kenji Sakamoto. Originally titled Sindbad's Seven Voyages, the earliest version of the attraction had a darker tone and no song. The attraction was subsequently restyled, and the current version opened in 2007.

== History ==
The Dark ride originally opened alongside Tokyo Disneysea as an opening day attraction on September 4, 2001. Its initial theme made the attraction unpopular, especially as it was said to even terrify some guests, including younger children.

Because of its scary, dark tone, the attraction was retooled with a lighter mood with the addition of an animal sidekick and a song written by Alan Menken (who also wrote songs for such films as The Little Mermaid, Beauty and the Beast, and Aladdin) titled "Compass of Your Heart".

== Ride Summary ==
=== 2001 Original Version ===
The Original Version of the ride that opened along with Tokyo Disneysea was darker and scarier. The song, "Compass of Your Heart" was not featured in the ride at all, and Chandu didn't appear either. Sindbad also originally had facial hair and narrated the story in a more conventional fashion, and paintings in the original queue illustrated the beginning of the story as a merchant's son (whom the guest at the park were taking the role on) wanting to seek adventure and treasure.

=== 2007 Revamped Version ===
In 2007, the attraction reopened after a lengthy refurbishment. The refurbishment brought to the attraction a number of changes to its storyline. This new version introduced the song, "Compass of Your Heart", variations of which can be heard throughout the ride. This version of the ride also introduced Chandu, a tiger cub who now serves as Sindbad's sidekick, appearing with him at different locations in every scene.

The storyline was also lightened, as the original 2001 version was much darker, and at times frightening for young children. Changes include:

- Instead of narrating to the guests conventionally, Sindbad now tells the story of his voyage through song.
- The opening now features Sindbad getting a grand send-off with flags and banners.
- The mermaids, who were originally sinister characters who attempted to lure Sindbad to a watery grave, now help him with their music and show him where he needs to go.
- On Rukh Island, the members of Sindbad's crew who were trying to steal the Roc's eggs are now villainous pirates who get their comeuppance at the talons of the Roc.
- The scene with the Giant finding Sindbad's crew playing with his treasure is now changed so that Sindbad and his crew are now acting to rescue him after he was imprisoned by the pirates.
- Where the Giant was once holding two of Sindbad's crewmates, he now plays a Morin khuur and joins with Sindbad in singing. It's also shown that the Giant has loaded up Sindbad's boat with treasure as thanks for saving him.
- Sindbad's visit to the Sultan's palace was originally a warning about the upcoming dangers that were to be encountered. The new version gave the scene a new focus, showing Sindbad collecting musical instruments during his travels.
- In the Land of the Monkeys scene, the monkeys were threatening to attack the guests as they sailed past. In the new version, they are instead celebrating as Sindbad introduces them to music.
- Sindbad's encounter with the Living Straits is now a more lighthearted encounter, as the whale playfully spews water from his blowhole and lifts Sindbad's boat out of the sea.
- The finale now celebrates Sindbad's return, with him unloading his treasures and revealing that the greatest treasure of all is friendship.
- The final scene before guests return to the load/unload dock originally featured a bearded salesman offering to sell Sindbad's boat to the guests. The revamped version of the scene now features Sindbad bidding guests farewell, telling them to follow the compass of their hearts.
