= Nemo & Friends SeaRider =

Simulator ride at Tokyo DisneySea

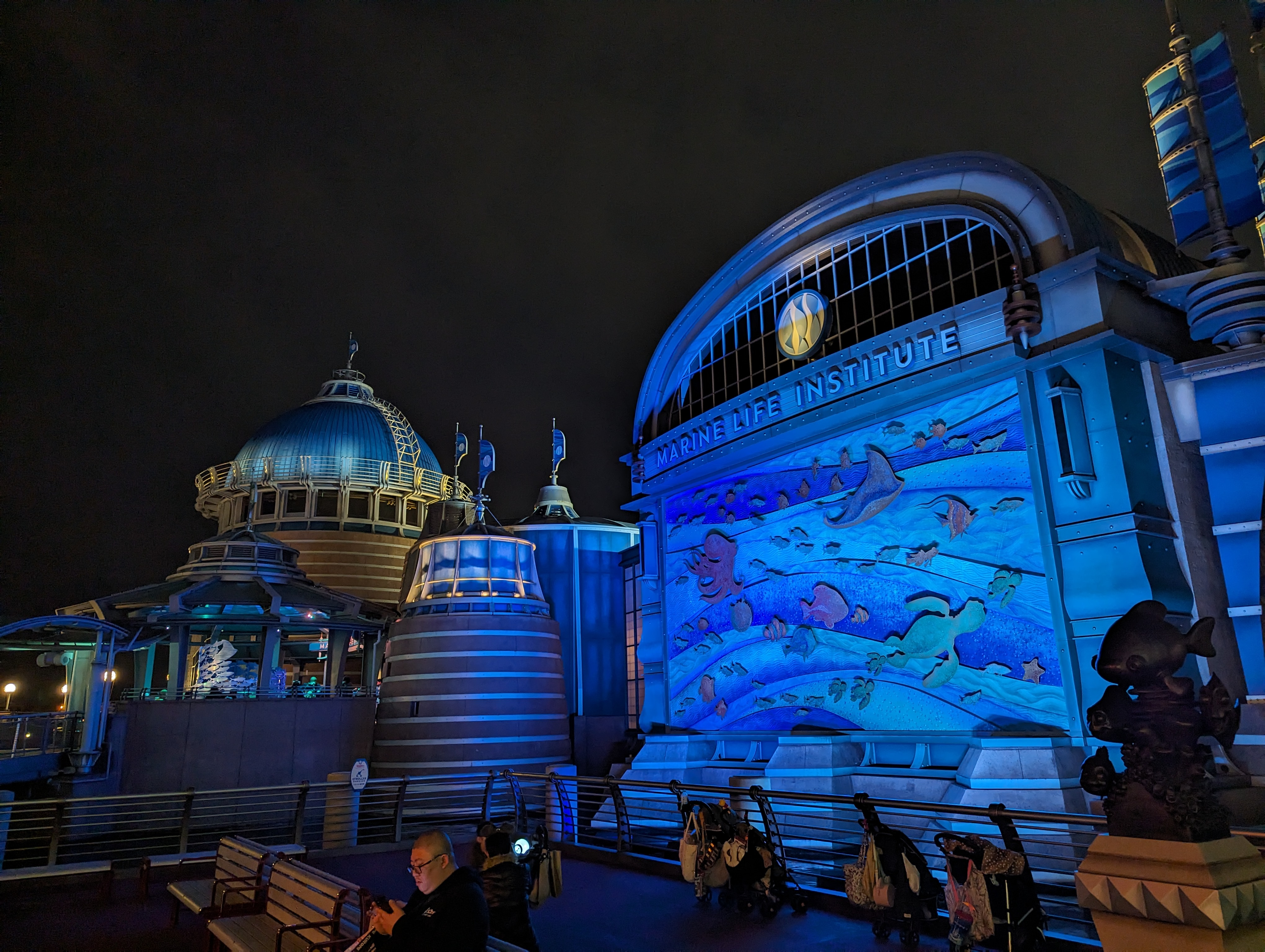
- The attraction building

Tokyo DisneySea
- Area: Port Discovery
- Coordinates: 35°37′30″N 139°52′57″E
- Status: Operating
- Opening date: May 12, 2017
- Replaced: StormRider

Ride statistics
- Attraction type: Simulator ride
- Designer: Walt Disney Imagineering
- Theme: Shrinking Submarine
- Vehicles: 2
- Riders per vehicle: 122
- Duration: 14 minutes
- Height restriction: 90 cm (2 ft 11 in)
- Sponsored by: JCB
- Disney Premier Access Priority Pass available
- Must transfer from wheelchair

Nemo & Friends SeaRider is a simulator ride at Tokyo DisneySea at Tokyo Disney Resort. It is based on the Disney/Pixar film Finding Nemo and its sequel, Finding Dory. Nemo & Friends SeaRider utilizes the same ride system as its predecessor, StormRider, which closed in 2016. The ride opened on May 12, 2017.

== Ride ==
The attraction is located in the Marine Life Institute (MLI) at the heart of Port Discovery. A cast member explains to visitors how difficult it was to explore the oceans in the past, and especially the marine life and behavior of fish. Scuba divers, submersibles with claws, and even submarines designed to look like fish would all scare the fish away. The MLI scientists had an idea to make a submarine that outright looked like a fish: they developed a special material called Chiziminium, named after the Japanese pun of 'Shrink-amin-iam', and used this to build a fish-like submarine that shrinks, with its passengers inside, when electricity is applied, as the cast member demonstrates; the fish-sub is called the SeaRider, a pink and purple machine with big blue 'eyes' and a smile on its 'face', and built with artificial intelligence and its own personality, helping real fish to accept it as an actual fish—the guests experience the whole ride not as people within a shrunken submarine but as a new character called Sheila within the Finding Nemo/Dory universe. Throughout the ride, Sheila runs into a varying cast of side characters from the films.

Once the Searider shrinks, passengers arrive either during a hide-and-seek game or one of Mr. Ray's field trips. They are invited to join in the fun while Dory reads the name of the sub and calls her new friend Sheila, as do Nemo, Marlin, and the others. When passengers arrive at the drop-off, they either learn that Marlin followed the field trip to keep an eye on Nemo and Dory, or meet Hank while Dory introduces Sheila to the others.

At that moment, either Squirt or Crush emerges from the current and the fish swim into the current to interact with the turtle. Crush helps steady Marlin when he almost shoots out of the current and Squirt playfully headbutts Sheila and comments that her head is as hard as a rock before we go on a wild ride across the current before we exit out.

When guests exit out, they either end up surrounded by Jellyfish or end up in a kelp forest with sea otters. In the Jellyfish scene, Dory plays with a baby jellyfish before it stings her and Marlin flicks it away; soon after a full-grown jellyfish stings Sheila, and Marlin saves her before they bounce across the Jellyfish forest with Nemo and Dory and make it out as Marlin protects Sheila from being stunned again. In the Kelp Forest scene, several playful otters swim around the kelp forest with Nemo, Dory, Marlin, and Sheila playing tag with their new friends before leaving after they nuzzle guests with the other fish.

After that, guests end up in a kiddie touch pool or at the underwater containers' site.

- At the Touch Pool scene, guests meet Hank outside a pipe where Nemo accidentally gets sucked into the pipe and Marlin follows, as do Dory, Sheila and Hank shortly after. Once they reunite, a human hand scares them and the group swims across the touch pool before Sheila is grabbed and the others look on in horror as Sheila is held eye level with Darla (a character who did not physically appear in the sequel) who at first is happy she grabbed a fish. Darla, however, begins to suspect that Sheila is not a real fish before Hank places a tentacle on her face, scaring Darla as she flings Sheila into the air before Hank saves her by catching her within a glass cup which already has Marlin, Dory, and Nemo inside. Hank moves past a terrified crowd of guests before he manages to get over the rails and escape into the water, where he embraces Marlin, Nemo, Dory, and Sheila with a hug, which ends briefly due to her being embarrassed.
- In The Midnight Zone Scene, Marlin asks Dory to call for help and she calls out for Bailey and Destiny via whale talk, making the hermit crabs shush her before the giant squid emerges from the container and chases the fish across the area before trying to devour Marlin, Dory, Nemo, and Sheila. The beast manages to corner them and attempts to eat them with one bite once they are pulled into the creature's beak. However, because of Sheila's super tough metal submarine body, the squid's beak cannot break through her body or eat her, sparing her and saving Nemo, Marlin and Dory in the process. This buys Bailey and Destiny enough time to arrive and save their small friends before they knock the creature into a container and it falls into the darkness as they all cheer and Dory brings her friends in for a group hug.

From there, guests are either flown across the sea by Becky and the loons that carry guests by their feet across some rocks and sea lions before being dropped into the water, or follow the stingray migration all the way back to the reef while Marlin, Nemo, and Dory sing along. Once guests arrive back home, everyone gathers around to bid Sheila a farewell and at that moment, Sheila returns to her normal size, startling whoever is left behind saying extra goodbyes for their friend, whether it's Dory, Hank, Pearl, Peach, Bloat, or Dory's parents Jenny and Charlie. The ride ends with a cast member saying goodbye and to come again.
