= DisneySea Electric Railway =

Elevated railway line in Tokyo, Japan

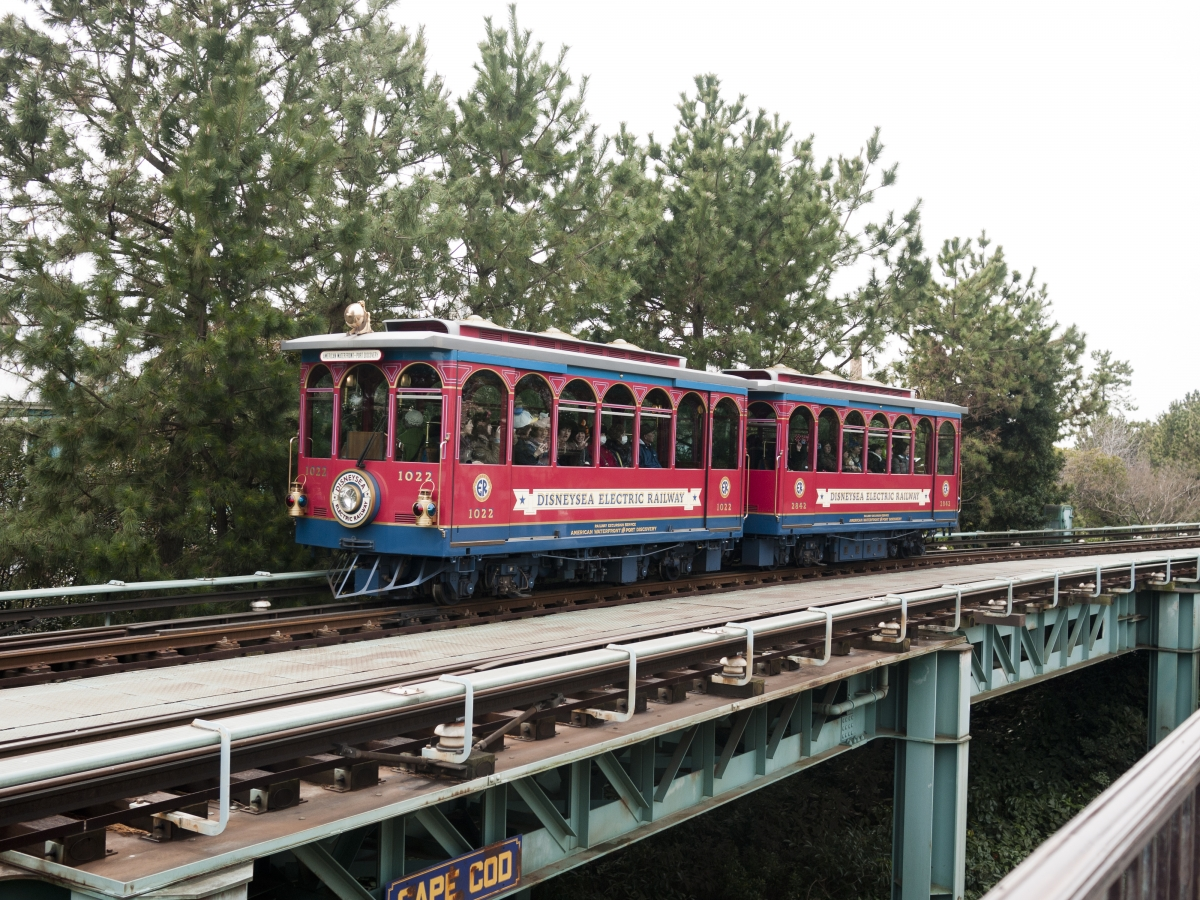

Tokyo DisneySea
- Area: American Waterfront and Port Discovery
- Coordinates: 35°37′29.56″N 139°53′16.04″E
- Status: Operating
- Opening date: September 4, 2001 (Tokyo DisneySea opening day attraction)

Ride statistics
- Attraction type: Elevated railway
- Riders per vehicle: 42
- Duration: about 2 minutes and 30 seconds
- Track gauge: 2 ft 6 in (762 mm)
- Sponsor: Takara Tomy

The DisneySea Electric Railway (ディズニーシー・エレクトリック・レールウェイ) is a 2 ft 6 in (762 mm) narrow gauge elevated electric railway attraction at Tokyo DisneySea. Opened on September 4, 2001, the railway is one of two rail attractions at Tokyo Disney Resort, the other being the Western River Railroad at Tokyo Disneyland.

== Overview ==
Sponsored by Takara Tomy, the DisneySea Electric Railway is an attraction and means of transportation between American Waterfront and Port Discovery. The ride vehicle is a red two-car train, reminiscent of historic elevated electric trains.

The majority of the line is double tracked to allow trains to run in both directions, but the stations are single tracked. When a large number of vehicles is in service, it is sometimes necessary for a vehicle to hold out in the double-tracked area when another vehicle is loading and unloading passengers in a station.

When Tokyo Disneyland was constructed, local railway laws were applicable to any railway that connected two points and can be used as a means of transportation, even if the railway was entirely on private land. As a result, the Western River Railroad was designed as a loop with no intermediate stops to avoid this regulation. The law was abolished on April 1, 1987, and as a result, Tokyo DisneySea could add railways useful as transportation within the park without falling under the local railway laws.

== Stations ==
=== American Waterfront Station ===
The American Waterfront Station is a single-tracked elevated station located above the McDuck's Department Store. The station entrance is at ground level in the McDuck's Department Store. The maintenance facility for the trains is also at this station.

=== Port Discovery Station ===
The Port Discovery Station is a single-tracked elevated station located in Port Discovery.

== See also ==
- Rail transport in Walt Disney Parks and Resorts

== Bibliography ==
- Amendola, Dana (2015), All Aboard: The Wonderful World of Disney Trains (1st ed.), Disney Editions, ISBN 978-1-4231-1714-8
