= Touchdown (disambiguation) =

A touchdown is the primary method of scoring in American and Canadian football.

Touchdown may also refer to:

== Films, television, entertainment ==
- Eyeworks Touchdown, a New Zealand-based television production company
- Travis Touchdown, the main character in the No More Heroes series
- Touchdown (1931 film), a pre-code football film
- Touchdown (2024 film), a British science fiction film

== Music ==
=== Albums ===
- Touchdown (Bob James album), 1978
- Touchdown (Brakes album), 2009
- Touchdown (JTR album), 2014
- Touchdown, a 2023 album by U.D.O.

=== Songs ===
- "Touchdown" (The Game song), featuring Raheem DeVaughn
- "Touchdown" (Lil Baby song)
- "Touchdown" (T.I. song), featuring Eminem
- "Touchdown", 2011 song by Trackshittaz
- "Touchdown", a song by Twice from their EP Page Two

== Sports ==
- Touchdown, a score in rugby league touch
- Touch down, a tie-breaker once used in association football
- Touchdown (mascot), the unofficial mascot of Cornell University
- Try (rugby), historically known as a touch down

== Others ==
- Touchdown, the landing of an animal or craft
- Touchdown Club of Columbus
- Touchdown Jesus, a statue facing the freeway near Monroe, Ohio
- DC Touchdown Club, a charity/scholarship organization
- Touchdown polymerase chain reaction

== See also ==
- TD (disambiguation)
