= Cars Land =

Themed land at Disney California Adventure

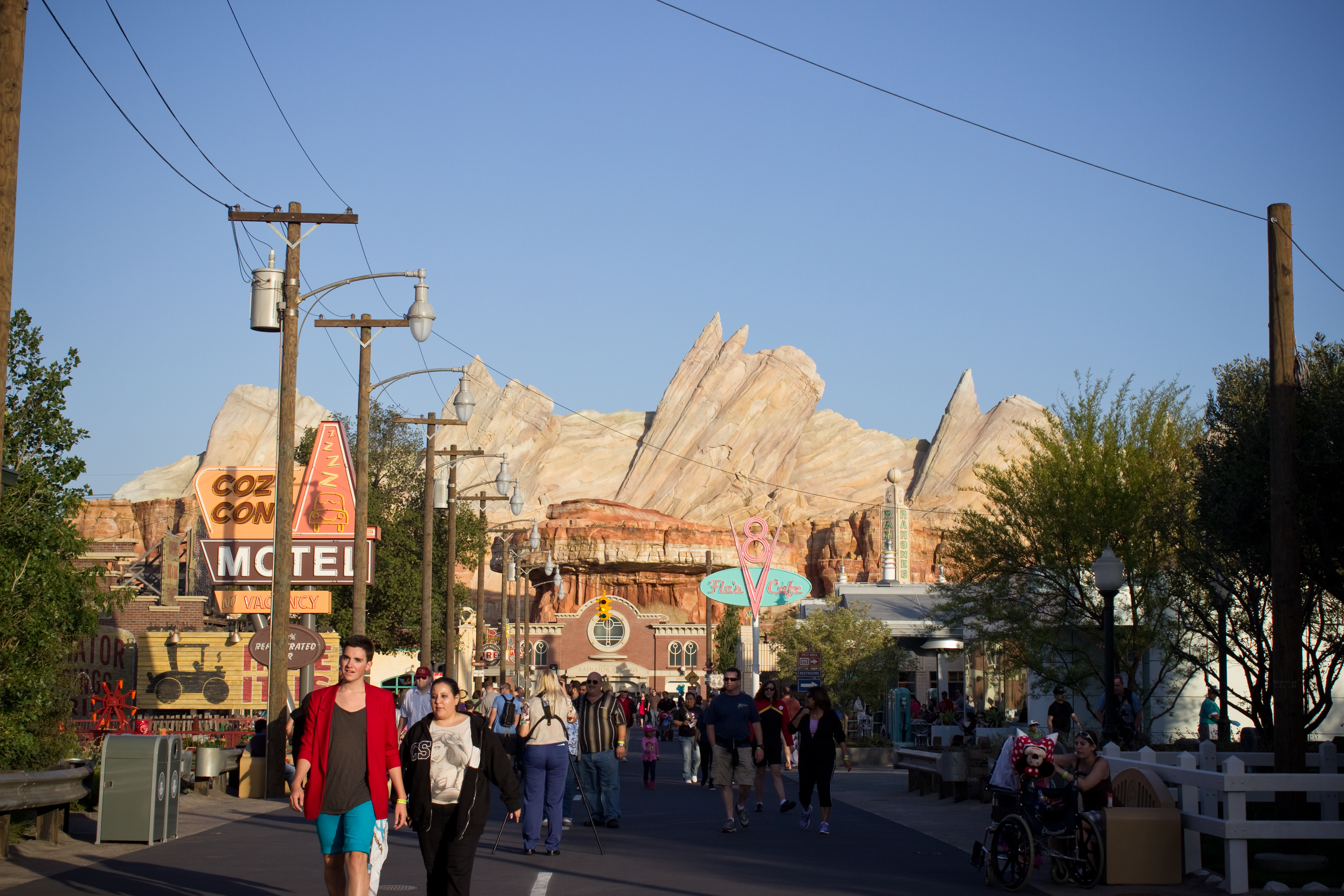
- Looking down Route 66 in Cars Land
- Interactive map of Cars Land
- Theme: Cars, Route 66
- Area: 12 acres (4.9 ha)

Attractions
- Total: 3

Disney California Adventure
- Coordinates: 33.8056°N 117.9187°W
- Status: Operating
- Opened: June 15, 2012
- Replaced: Bountiful Valley Farm

Cars Land is a themed area of Disney California Adventure, inspired by Pixar's Cars franchise, and Route 66 in America. The 12-acre (4.9 ha) area, built as part of Disney California Adventure's $1.1 billion expansion project, opened on June 15, 2012, a year after the release of Cars 2. It contains three rides as well as shops and restaurants, all situated in a replica of Radiator Springs, the fictional town in which most of the first film's events take place. The area's main attraction is Radiator Springs Racers, a racing ride that uses the technology of Epcot's Test Track.

Cars Land is themed to race day in Radiator Springs. The story goes that Lightning McQueen and his friends from Radiator Springs invited cars from all around the world to come celebrate race day in the town where it all began. The town decorated to welcome in the cars (and drivers) from everywhere. Mater pulled out a jukebox to provide the music for the race, but it attracted some tractors instead. Luigi invited his cousins from Carsoli to visit and they are dancing to celebrate race day.

Every evening around sunset, the neon lights populating the land steadily turn on while "Sh-Boom" plays.

== History ==
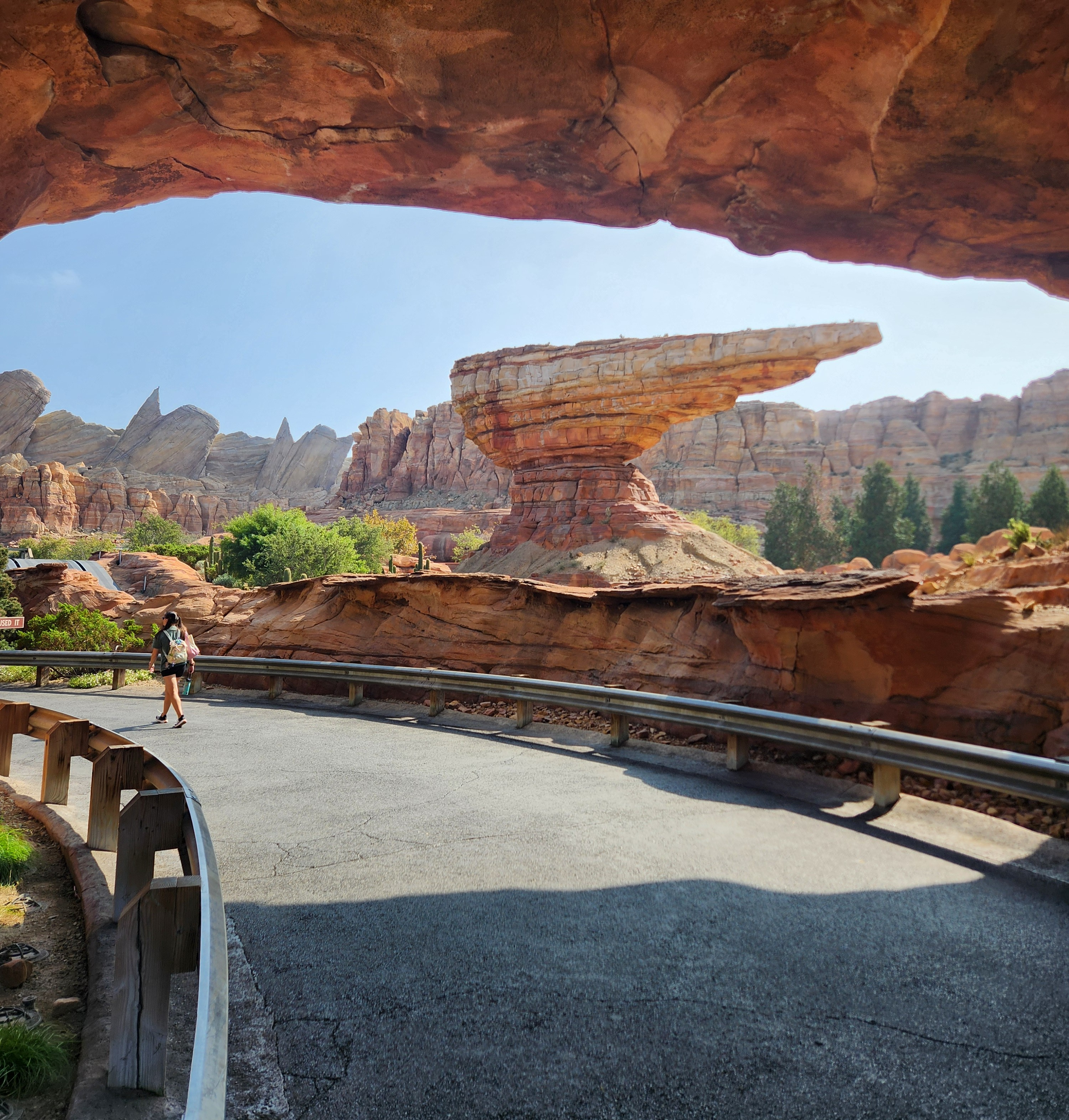
View of Cars Land, as seen when entering from San Fransokyo Square

Most of the present-day site of Cars Land had been used as the "Timon" parking lot since 2001; the lot had been designated as future growth space for Disney California Adventure when it was originally designed in the 1990s, and was partially built over with The Twilight Zone Tower of Terror and the Flik's Fun Fair section of A Bug's Land. A small portion of Cars Land was built over the site of the Bountiful Valley Farm, one of the park's original attractions.

As revealed in The Imagineering Story, initially the park was going to be called "Carland" and would be themed after the automobile in general. It was not until after Cars was seen as a viable franchise that it was rethemed and renamed "Cars Land".

Concept art for "Carland" appeared in the "Dreaming" section of the Walt Disney Company's 2006 Annual Report, released on December 12, 2006, six months after Cars was released in theaters. The concept art depicted a racing simulator ride, but provided no specifics; Disney CEO Bob Iger stated at the time that the concept art depicted projects at various stages of development, and that some of the projects depicted "may never be built."

On October 17, 2007, Disney announced a 5-year, $1.1 billion renovation and expansion plan for Disney California Adventure. The plan included a major overhaul of several existing areas of the park and the addition of Cars Land, an area themed to the 2006 film; Cars Land would be anchored by Radiator Springs Racers, which uses the technology of Test Track, a ride at Epcot at the Walt Disney World Resort. Cars Land along with the re-designed entrance plaza, Buena Vista Street, were the last features of the 5-year project to be completed, and opened on June 15, 2012.

== Attractions ==
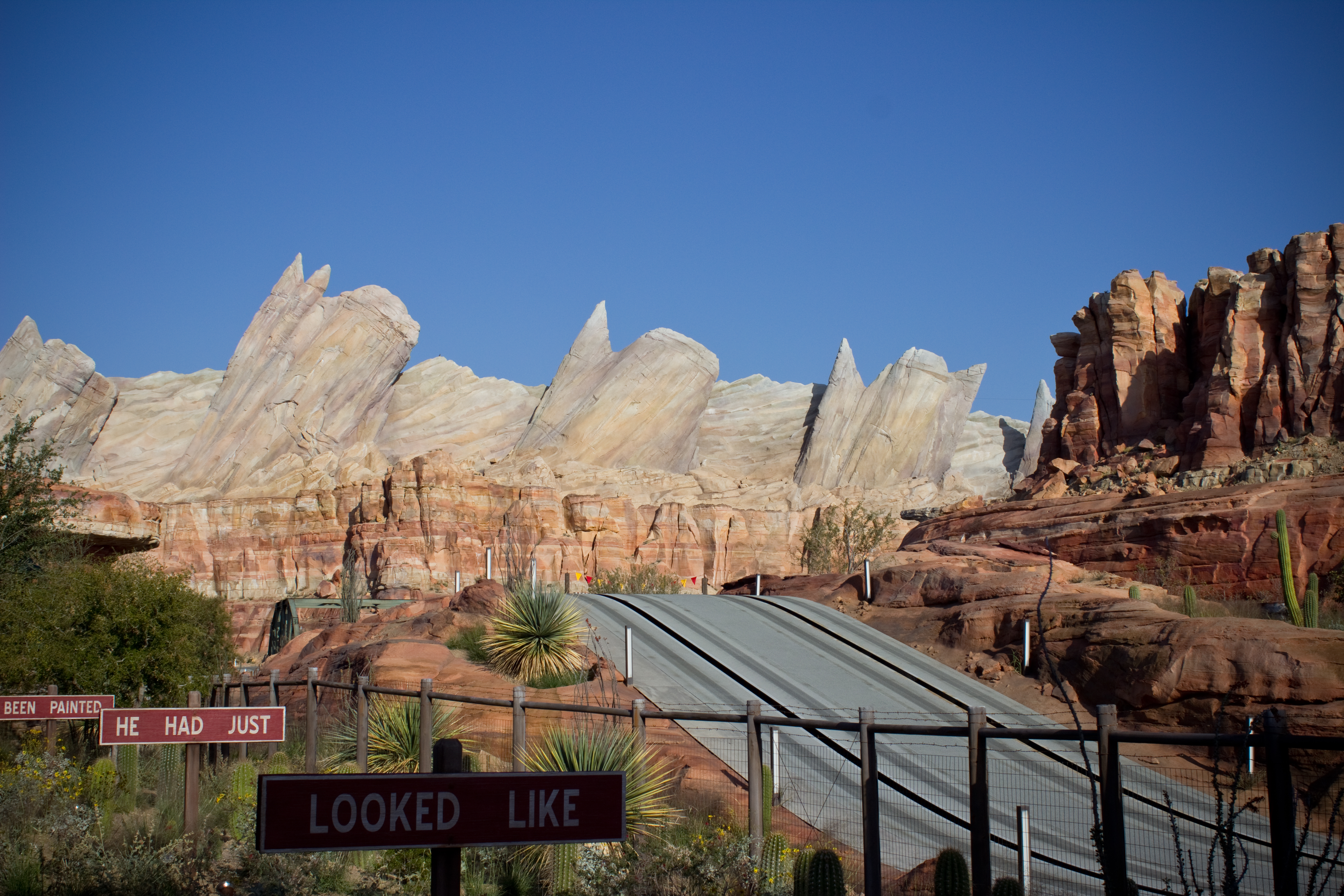
Radiator Springs Racers

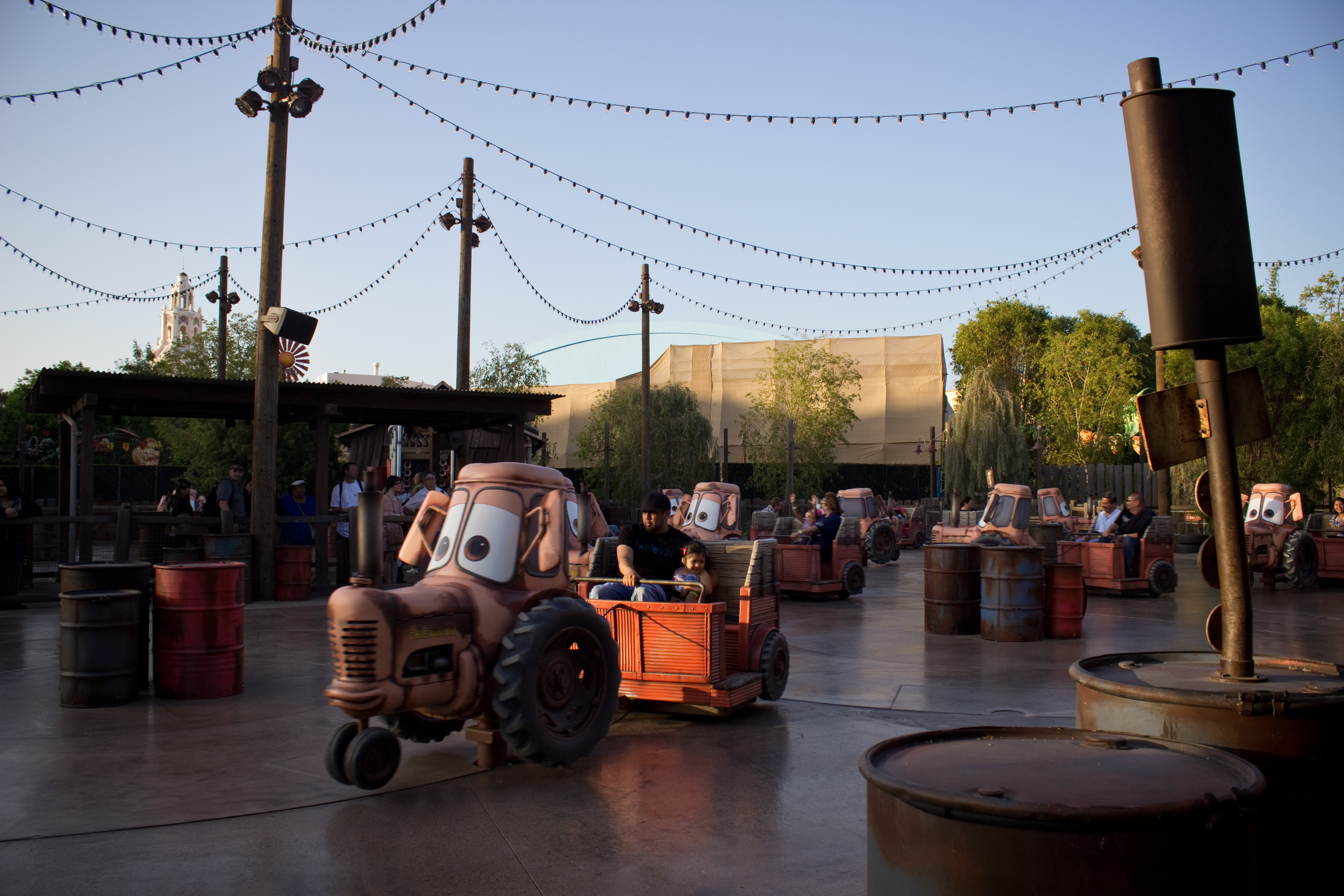
Mater's Junkyard Jamboree

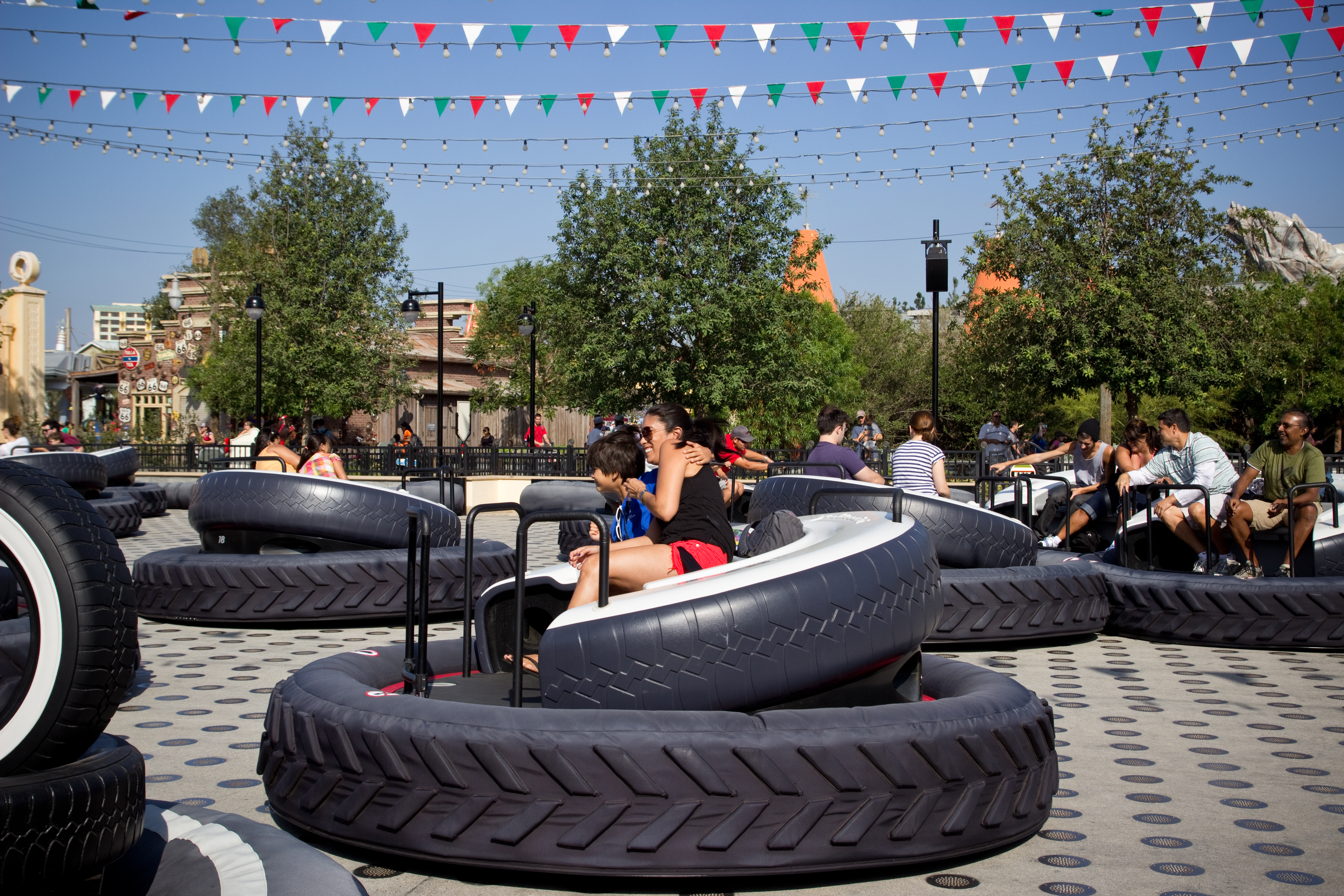
Luigi's Flying Tires (2012–2015)

=== Radiator Springs Racers ===
Radiator Springs Racers is a slot car dark ride. The attraction takes guests in six-person vehicles through the winding roads up the mountains outside Radiator Springs and by the waterfall scene in the first film. The cars then enter the mountain and take a semi-wild ride through the outskirts of town where they encounter a number of characters. Eventually, they enter Radiator Springs at which point the track splits into two: one goes into Ramone's while the other into Luigi's. From here, the cars enter a briefing room where Doc gives guests some advice for the upcoming race. The two tracks come back near one another and two cars stop side-by-side. The race begins as the vehicles accelerate out of the mountain and through hairpin turns and steep banks, ending with a randomized race result and then a brief trip through Tail Light Caverns. The technology used is similar to Test Track at Epcot in Walt Disney World in Florida, and Journey to the Center of the Earth at Tokyo DisneySea.

=== Mater's Junkyard Jamboree ===
Mater's Junkyard Jamboree (renamed Mater's Graveyard JamBOOree during Halloween and Mater's Jingle Jamboree during Christmas) is a heavily modified 3-table Zamperla Demolition Derby ride with custom ride vehicles provided by Walt Disney Imagineering. Instead of the usual car-shaped ride vehicles, Disney designed new vehicles featuring a non-rideable tractor connected by a swinging hitch to a rickshaw-like bench with a swinging wheel on the bottom that allows the benches to “drift” along the corners in a fashion similar to a whip ride. The ride itself is themed to a jamboree held by Mater for the young tractors seen in the first film, featuring several original songs sung by Larry the Cable Guy, along with other singers and musicians.

Similar attractions to Mater's Junkyard Jamboree have been built since the ride opened with Cars Land in 2012. The most recent example is Alien Swirling Saucers, which is a mirrored copy located at Disney’s Hollywood Studios themed to the little aliens in the Pizza Planet claw game from the first Toy Story film, and The Happy Ride with Baymax, which is also a mirrored copy located at Tokyo Disneyland. A standard 2-table Demolition Derby with the original non-swinging ride vehicles was also built at Walt Disney Studios Park at the Disneyland Paris resort, but unlike the other two rides this version has no custom musical score.

The shed in the attraction is based on ride designer Jim Shull's father's dark room, built by his grandfather, located on the avocado farm Shull grew up on.

=== Luigi's Rollickin' Roadsters ===
Luigi's Rollickin' Roadsters (renamed Luigi's Honkin' Haul-O-Ween during Halloween and Luigi's Joy to the Whirl during Christmas) – Guests queue in Luigi's Casa Della Tires shop and ride in vehicles that move and spin around to Italian music. The attraction uses a trackless ride system, similar to Aquatopia at Tokyo DisneySea. The ride vehicles are depicted as being Luigi's cousins who have come to Radiator Springs from Carsoli for a dance celebration. The attraction, which officially opened March 7, 2016, replaced Luigi's Flying Tires, the original attraction in this location.

=== Former attractions ===
- Luigi's Flying Tires (2012–2015)

== Restaurants ==
=== Cozy Cone Motel ===
The Cozy Cone Motel features five different cones, each with a very different menu of food and drinks, including churros, ice cream, snacks, pretzels, and popcorn. The motel office in front is not accessible to guests, although the interior is decorated as it was in the films. Additionally, the front and side entrances of the motel is a common space for character meet and greets, with guests being able to meet Lightning McQueen and Mater.

=== Flo's V8 Cafe ===
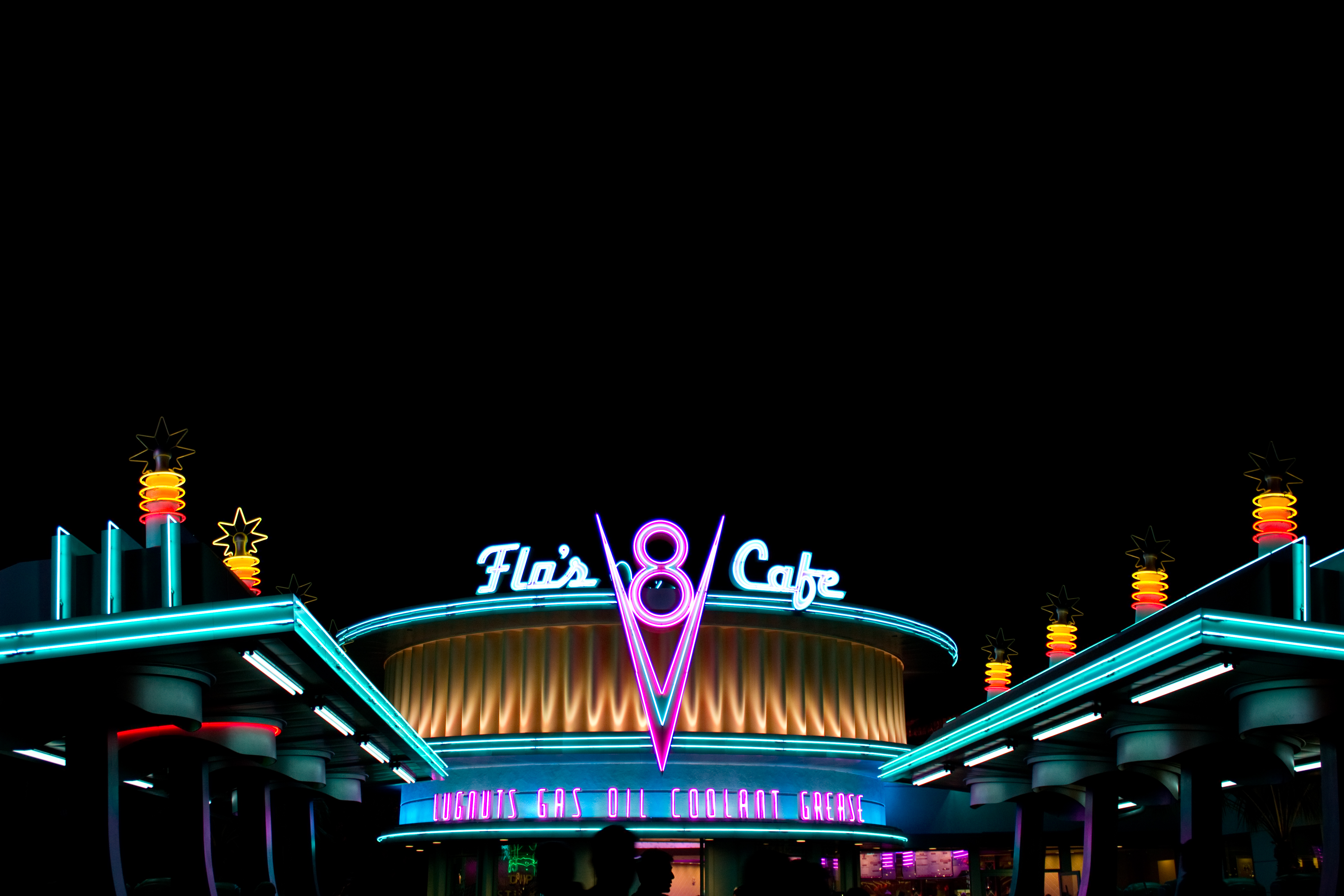
Flo's V8 Cafe at night

Flo's V8 Cafe serves breakfast, lunch, dinner, and dessert with traditional American homestyle fare. Part of the indoor dining room is located inside of Doc Hudson's Ornament Valley Medical Clinic, while guests can also dine outdoors underneath the gas pumps and at tables behind the restaurant. Decor inside pays tribute to the "Motorama Girls" story from the Cars Storybook and deleted scenes, and to the Fabulous Hudson Hornet's Piston Cup titles.

=== Fillmore's Taste-In ===
Fillmore's Taste-In is a quick-service snack stand serving pre-packaged snacks and drinks.

== Characters ==
- Lightning McQueen
- Tow Mater
- Cruz Ramirez
- Red the Fire Truck

== Shopping ==
- Ramone's House of Body Art
- Sarge's Surplus Hut
- Radiator Springs Curios

== Layout ==
The layout of Cars Land from the guest's perspective is one of looking down the main street of Radiator Springs, USA, as seen in the original Cars film. There are references to the events of Cars 2 (2011) throughout the land, such as a billboard (seen when entering from Avengers Campus) that gives Mater the title of "Sir," and a signed photo of Finn McMissile with Luigi and Guido in Luigi's Casa Della Tires, in addition to souvenirs from their World Grand Prix trip in a display case.

The main street is Route 66 coming in from the Golden State area, across from the Golden Vine Winery. There is one other entrance is a street from Ornament Valley from Pacific Wharf which is called Cross Street. At the end of Route 66 is the courthouse/firehouse where the street splits. To the left of the split is a backstage access gate. To the right of the split is the entrance to Radiator Springs Racers. In the distance, the Radiator Cap and Ornament Valley Range can be seen. The eastern edge of the Ornament Valley Range includes the Cadillac Mountain Range that consists of Cadillac tail fins that are 125 feet (38 m) high and covers 300,000 square feet (28,000 m^{2}).

The Bountiful Valley Farm included a cast commissary building, which ended up being in a visible area of the new section. As it would have been expensive to move, the structure was disguised as Carburetor County Tractor Feed and Farm Truck Association Hall.

== See also ==
- 2012 in amusement parks
