= Flying Saucers (attraction) =

Former attraction at Disneyland in California, United States

Coordinates: 33°48′41″N 117°55′02″W

- Attraction poster

Disneyland
- Area: Tomorrowland
- Status: Removed
- Opening date: August 6, 1961
- Closing date: September 5, 1966
- Replaced by: Tomorrowland Stage

Ride statistics
- Attraction type: Bumper cars
- Manufacturers: National Research Associates, Inc; Arrow Development
- Designer: WED Enterprises
- Theme: UFOs
- Vehicle type: Flying saucers
- Riders per vehicle: 1
- Propulsion method: Air Valves

Flying Saucers was an amusement ride at Disneyland in Anaheim, California from 1961 to 1966. The ride was manufactured by Arrow Development and National Research Associates, Inc.

Guests rode on personal flying saucers on a cushion of air, similar to an air hockey game, which played in a way similar to bumper cars with guests ramming each other with their saucers.

As the ride began, the saucers would be subject to a high volume of low-pressure air directed underneath the saucers by means of a grid of circular valves from a plenum chamber below the field on which they operated. As the saucers moved about the field, the valves would open and close in response to their proximity. As guests shifted their weight in any direction by leaning, saucer movement would respond by means of an air jet derived from the increased pressure in the saucer's plenum. If weight was centered, the saucer would begin to "hop" up and down as the air randomly escaped around the plenum. All that was required to regain control was for the guest to lean in any direction.

The ride consisted of two sets of saucers (approximately 14 each) on a semi-circular field and a mechanical boom that would sweep the arc of the field and corral one set of saucers in the loading area. As the boom moved, it would free the other set of saucers (with their new riders) from their loading area to roam the field while the other set was unloaded and loaded in-turn.

The ride was expensive to operate, maintenance was intensive, and it did not fit the normal Disneyland "guest flow" in that a relatively small number of riders was able to participate on any given day. The Flying Saucers did not survive the transition to New Tomorrowland. When New Tomorrowland opened in 1967, the space that this ride occupied was turned into the Tomorrowland Stage.

On June 15, 2012, a new ride using similar technology opened in Cars Land inside Disneyland's sister park, Disney California Adventure. This ride was named Luigi's Flying Tires, and themed to Luigi's Casa Della Tires shop from Pixar's 2006 film Cars. This version held two or three passengers per ride vehicle instead of one. On February 17, 2015, the attraction closed. It was replaced by Luigi's Rollickin' Roadsters which opened in March 2016, still themed to Luigi's Casa Della Tires, but featuring new vehicles and a new ride system unrelated to the Flying Saucers.

== See also ==
- List of former Disneyland attractions
