= World of Motion =

Former attraction at Epcot in Walt Disney World

- The Transportation pavilion logo, used for both World of Motion and (to varying degrees) its successor Test Track

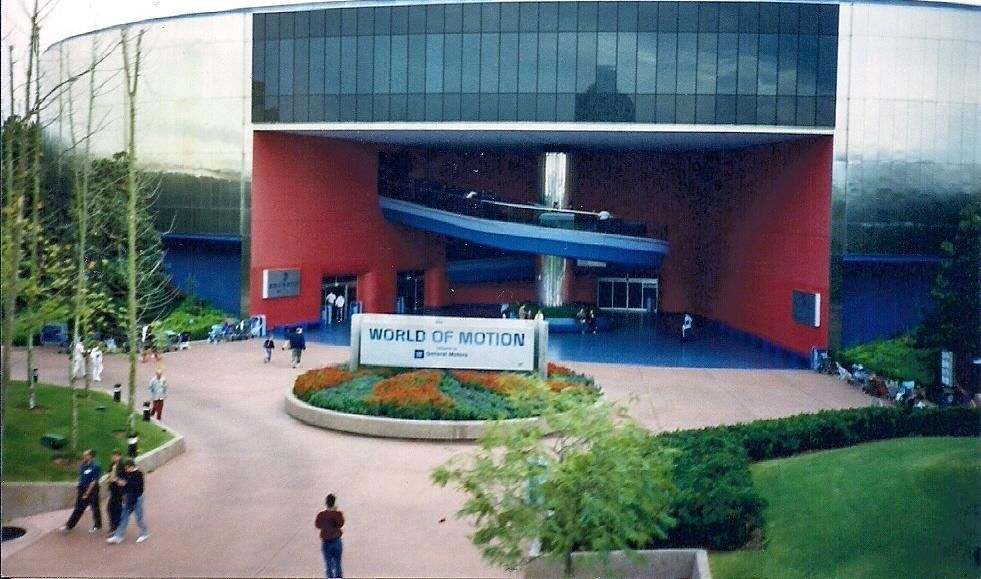
- World of Motion's exterior, pictured in 1989

Epcot
- Area: Future World
- Coordinates: 28°22′22.39″N 81°32′50″W
- Status: Removed
- Cost: $44,000,000
- Opening date: October 1, 1982
- Closing date: January 2, 1996
- Replaced by: Test Track (World Discovery)

Ride statistics
- Attraction type: Dark ride
- Designer: Walt Disney Imagineering
- Theme: Transportation
- Music: "It's Fun to Be Free" written by X Atencio and Buddy Baker
- Height: 60 ft (18 m)
- Site area: 79,400 sq ft (7,380 m^{2})
- Vehicle type: Omnimover
- Riders per vehicle: 4–6
- Duration: 15:00
- Sponsor: General Motors
- Control system: Omnimover
- Host: Gary Owens
- Audio-animatronics: 188
- Show scenes: 30
- Must transfer from wheelchair

World of Motion, presented by General Motors, was the former occupant of the transportation pavilion in Epcot at Walt Disney World Resort. It was an opening day attraction at EPCOT Center in 1982 and it closed in 1996 to make way for Test Track, a new thrill ride through a GM testing facility.

Visitors would board moving four to six person Omnimover vehicles, and would be taken through scenes that were populated with Audio-Animatronic figures and also projection effects. It was a whimsical look at the history and achievements in transportation, showing scenes from the invention of the wheel right up to the present day and beyond.

The grand finale of the attraction attempted to predict a real future for transportation, with CenterCore, a sparkling metropolis that seemed to be in perpetual motion, and Pepper's Ghost illusions putting guests into futuristic vehicles. At the ride's conclusion, visitors disembarked into the TransCenter, an interactive area about new products in development by GM.

World of Motion closed in 1996. GM has continued its sponsorship in World of Motion's replacement attraction, Test Track, since its opening in 1999. From 2012 to 2024, GM sponsored the attraction through its Chevrolet division, before reverting back to GM branding in 2025.

== History ==
The premise of the ride was to be a humorous look into the history of transportation, from the ancient days of foot power, through time into the future. General Motors signed a 10-year sponsorship deal for the ride, in a move to compete with Ford (which had sponsored a Disney-created attraction at the 1964 New York World's Fair). The pavilion's construction was a part of the initial construction of EPCOT Center itself. The attraction was ready for grand opening with the park on October 1, 1982, and was in EPCOT Center's "opening cast". The pavilion was given a specific opening ceremony with GM executives a few days later.

The attraction was primarily designed by Ward Kimball and Marc Davis. Their trademark sense of humor and visual gags was contrasted with the more straightfaced tone of the narration, provided by actor Gary Owens.

== Ride summary ==
The ride began with a modern U-turn up a portico that was situated directly at the entrance into the building. The Omnimovers would then bring riders to a simple caveman cave. However, it would head into the first means of transportation: footpower, where a caveman and cavewoman are seen blowing on their hot feet.

The second scene presented the earliest means of overwater transportation, people traveling on projected boats and a man fast asleep on a raft floating while a crocodile lunges at him. The next scene showed the first time animal power was introduced. It showed an Assyrian tableau with a person trying to control animals from camels to zebras who get tired. This scene also showed a man holding a crystal ball on a flying carpet.

The next scene showed the invention of the wheel at Babylon. A gag showed men holding a square object, a triangle object, a pentagonal object, and the award-winning circle object that won the king’s laughter. Before exiting, riders passed a wheel factory, into a part called trade and commerce where it shows many useful ideas using wheels from different lands. There were examples such as a rickshaw and a chariot. The next scene was a used chariot dealership where everything including the Trojan Horse, was trying to be sold. Ships were introduced next as an explorer run into a sea serpent.

The next scene was the "Age of Flight". It began with Mona Lisa, who was clearly upset at Leonardo da Vinci and his many attempts to fly; all of which proved to be unsuccessful. The following scene was a man looking over London in a hot air balloon.

The next scenes were the evolution of steam. It started out with a never-ending stream of stagecoaches of the likes of a Mississippi Riverboat. The steam locomotive was the next evolution of steam travel, which in turn showed an authentic steam locomotive and an authentic railroad robbery while a sheriff with a gleaming badge protects us on our way to the next scene.

Guests then traveled past the open road scenes, which include a man who crashed a bicycle. Then, the scene shifted over to the world's first traffic jam. The chaos included items such as an upset horse, a spilling ice truck, and kids screaming during the 1900s, a family picnic, and a suspicious policeman. In addition, a picture is taken with a flying ace and a woman; the wind and the airplanes make it hard to take a picture. A scenes were then shown with all the forms of cars raging from early 1930s to 1970s cars.

The following areas were "speed tunnels" which paid homage to the tunnels in the Magic Kingdom's "If You Had Wings". The Omnimover traveled through these bullet-shaped tunnels while images were played on the screens. Some included crop-dusting, rafting, and traveling down a snowmobile trail.

The tunnels led to the final exhibit: CenterCore, the amazing city of the future. Just before unloading, riders were asked to "help shape tomorrow's mobility" with a similar effect as The Hitchhiking Ghosts from the Haunted Mansion, the riders in their Omnimovers appeared to be a simulated car of the future.

== TransCenter ==
Riders left their Omnimover vehicles and went to the TransCenter, which was full of exhibits and showed about transportation and the things surrounding it. It took an Innoventions-style feel to all of it. The TransCenter portion of World of Motion, designed by award-winning experience designer Bob Rogers (designer) and the design team BRC Imagination Arts, offered educational attractions which included prototype cars such as the Lean Machine in the Dreamer's Workshop and a show called The Water Engine, which pitted nine animated characters associated with various and alternate fuel-systems in a debate over which motor design should be used to power cars. There was a replica of America's only wind-tunnel on display. The ever-popular animatronic show "Bird and the Robot", starring a cigar-smoking toucan ("Bird") and an assembly-line robot ("Tiger", actually a GM-developed PUMA) entertained people with acts (and Bird's signature bad jokes) about the advanced technology of the GM assembly line. A computer-generated display showed GM's car 'torture' test without actually performing it. Concept 2000 showed the process of creating prototype cars for GM. The prototype concept cars at the TransCenter were once the most photographed spot in Walt Disney World. An exhibit called Aerotest educated people about air-flow on auto concepts and fuel economy. Another exhibit featured stylings of clothes with GM's advanced polyester production styles.

== Closure ==
Business slumped with General Motors after the second sponsorship deal ended for World of Motion in 1992, and as a result, GM started signing 1-year contracts for the ride. However, a suggested idea to gut the building and turn it into a new attraction stuck with Disney representatives and GM businessmen. It would take World of Motion, close it down, and refurbish it into a new ride that focused only on cars. In November 1995, Epcot announced the closure of World of Motion and Universe of Energy. World of Motion would be transformed into Test Track, while Universe of Energy would be rethemed to Ellen's Energy Adventure. On January 2, 1996, World of Motion was shut down to the public. Halfway through the final ride, the attraction faced technical difficulties. GM executives were riding World of Motion and had to walk back to the loading station. Scheduled to open 19 months after World of Motion's closing, Test Track would put guests in a test car against vehicle tests that were needed to deem the car safe for road travel. However, nothing went as planned, and the new ride opened significantly later than the scheduled opening date.

The closing of World of Motion forced the reopening of Horizons, another Disney attraction that focused on the future of the family. It was closed in 1999.

Test Track pays tribute to World of Motion. The logo can be found on the entrance signs, outside banners, and trash cans. It is also visible inside the station on the backside of one of the posts. During the climactic outdoor speed portion, guests can spot a few signs. One of them has a picture of a futuristic city, which echoes a model of the same future city seen earlier in the ride right after the brake test. There is another sign located near the right turn. It contains the World of Motion logo and the "FN2BFRE" text, which is a reference to the theme song heard in the attraction.

== Sponsor ==
Pavilion sponsor General Motors signed a 10-year sponsorship contract in December 1977. When the second contract finished in 1992, and with a slumping economy GM agreed only to one-year contracts and wanted Disney Imagineering to work on a new attraction. GM insisted that the new ride would focus only on cars, as opposed to the general concept of transportation. The marketing department wanted to strongly promote their cars. GM was the sponsor for the whole run of the attraction.

== Soundtrack ==
The theme song for the ride was "It's Fun to Be Free", written by X Atencio ("Yo Ho (A Pirate's Life for Me)" from Pirates of the Caribbean and "Grim Grinning Ghosts" from The Haunted Mansion), and Buddy Baker, another legendary Disney composer. The song was played throughout the ride (and queue area) with music changing to reflect the different time periods as the ride progressed through the various scenes.

The song can be found on The Official Album of Disneyland and Walt Disney World (1991) and Official Album: The Happiest Celebration on Earth – Walt Disney World Resort Album.

== See also ==
- Epcot attraction and entertainment history
- Futurama (New York World's Fair)
