= Radiator Springs Racers =

Simulated slot car type dark ride attraction

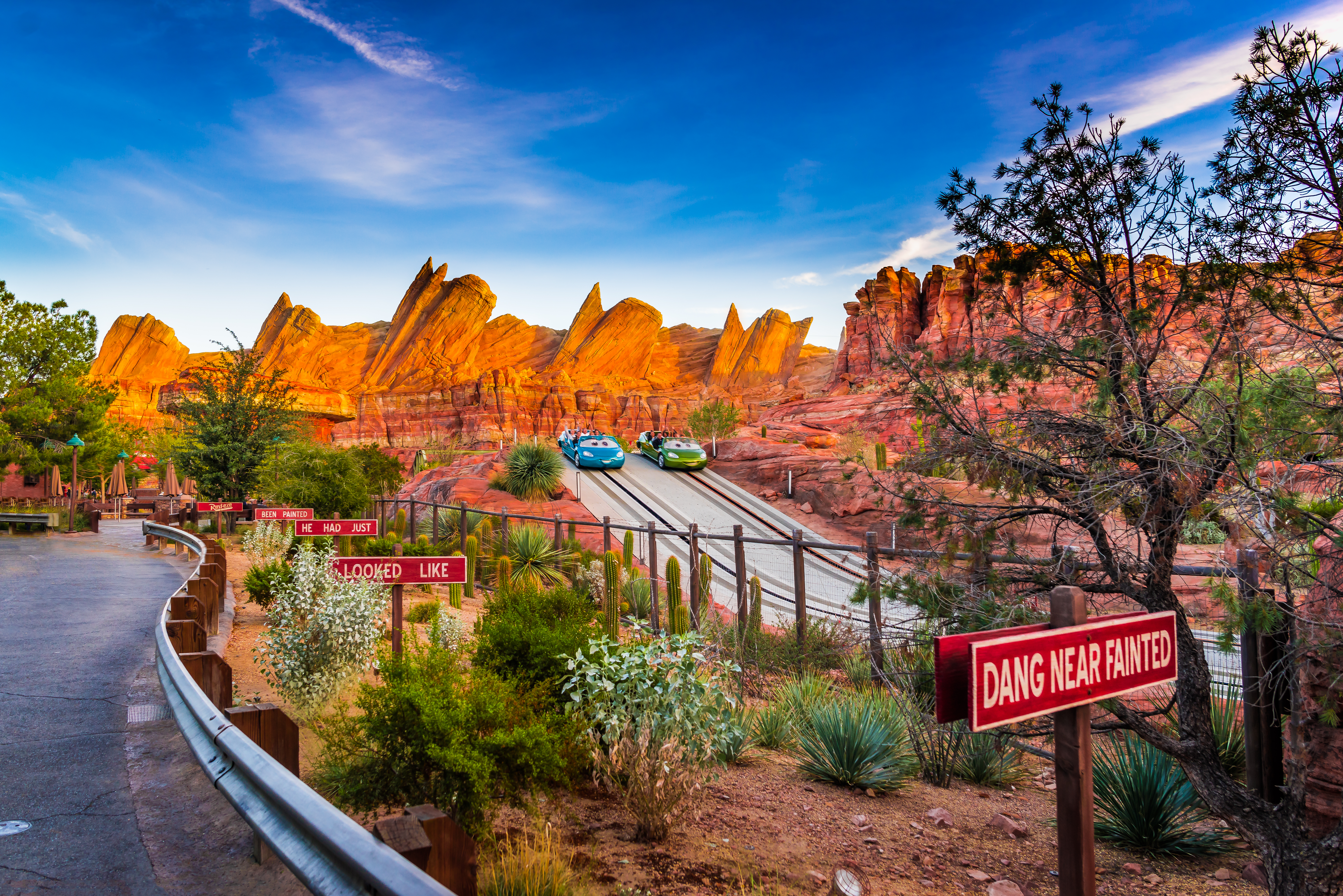
- Part of the outdoor section of Radiator Springs Racers

Disney California Adventure
- Area: Cars Land
- Coordinates: 33°48′17″N 117°55′07″W
- Status: Operating
- Cost: $200 million+
- Opening date: June 15, 2012

Ride statistics
- Attraction type: Slot car ride / Dark ride
- Manufacturer: Dynamic Attractions
- Designer: Walt Disney Imagineering; General Motors Corporation (Test Track technology)
- Theme: Cars
- Speed: 40 mph (64 km/h)
- Riders per vehicle: 6
- Rows: 2
- Riders per row: 3
- Duration: 4:22
- Height restriction: 40 in (102 cm)
- Propulsion: Onboard electric motor
- Audio-Animatronics: 23
- Lightning Lane Single Pass Available
- Single rider line available

Radiator Springs Racers is a slot car ride in Cars Land at Disney California Adventure. The attraction features a third-generation version of transport technology originally developed for the Test Track attraction at Epcot in Walt Disney World. Radiator Springs Racers is themed to Pixar's Cars franchise. At a cost of over $200 million, the attraction is the most expensive at Disneyland Resort and one of the most expensive theme park attractions in the world. It accounted for about 18% of the entire cost of the $1.1 billion expansion of Disney California Adventure Park. The attraction takes guests in a six-person vehicle through encounters with characters from the 2006 film Cars. Guests then race another vehicle through turns and hills, ending with a randomized race result.

== History ==
The attraction, along with the rest of the Disney California Adventure multi-year expansion, was announced on October 17, 2007. However, the first indication of the attraction and the new land was some concept art published in the Dreaming section of the Walt Disney Company's 2006 annual report. By late 2009, construction on the attraction and the land within it began and was finished two and a half years later. At the "What's Next?" presentation at Disney California Adventure on June 11, 2010, Imagineer Kathy Mangum gave a brief rundown of the attraction's storyline. Ride testing began in early 2012 with soft openings the following spring. The ride officially opened to the public on June 15, 2012, with wait times of up to six hours. The line would stretch towards Paradise Pier, bypassing Cars Land.

Radiator Springs Racers was ranked second in the Amusement Today's Golden Ticket Awards for best new ride for 2012.

=== Incidents ===
On May 24, 2022, shortly after 8:30 PM PST, Radiator Springs Racers was closed down after a ride vehicle started emitting black smoke just before crossing the finish line of the ride, with guests yelling to be let off of the ride. As a result, the ride temporarily closed on May 24, 2022. Per a Disneyland spokesperson, it would remain closed out of an abundance of caution, as work was likely being done on the ride vehicles.

Another Incident occurred on September 29, 2026 when a yellow ride vehicle came to an abrupt stop at a unspecified point. A red ride vehicle then struck into the stopped vehicle. Staff members quickly transferred all affected riders to other vehicles so the guests could continue their experience. Disney staff did not address the riders or any possible injuries as to not create an official injury report. After this event the ride was listed as temporarily closed for safety inspections. This matured to the ride being closed for the rest of the day.

== Ride experience ==
=== Queue ===
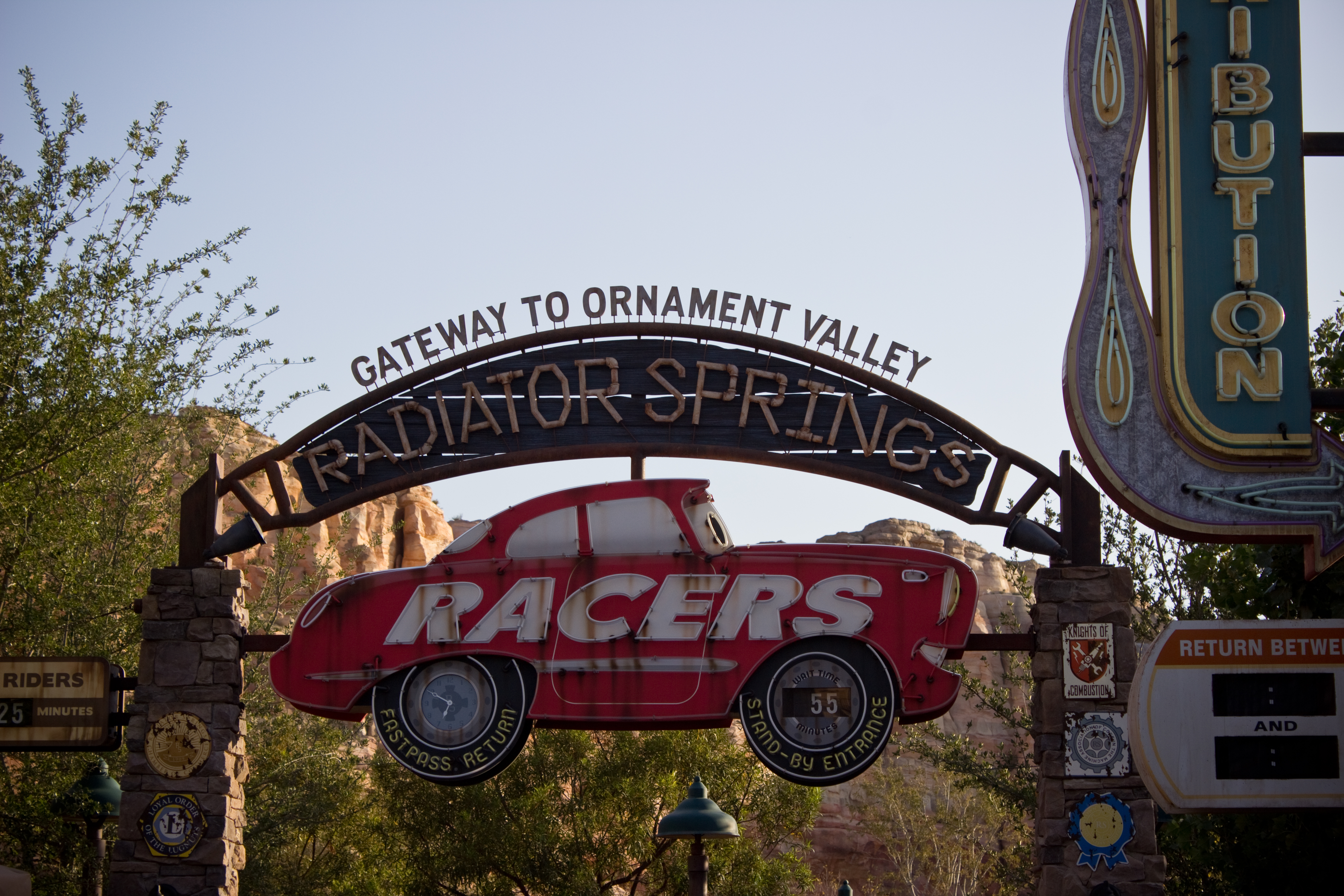
Entrance sign

The attraction's marquee is mounted on a large archway near the Radiator Springs courthouse. The queue passes through the archway and beneath two bridges before entering Stanley's Oasis, nestled between the cliffs of Ornament Valley. After winding through three of the town's earliest buildings, guests enter the Comfy Caverns Motor Court, where they board a convertible race car and the ride portion of the attraction begins.

=== Layout ===
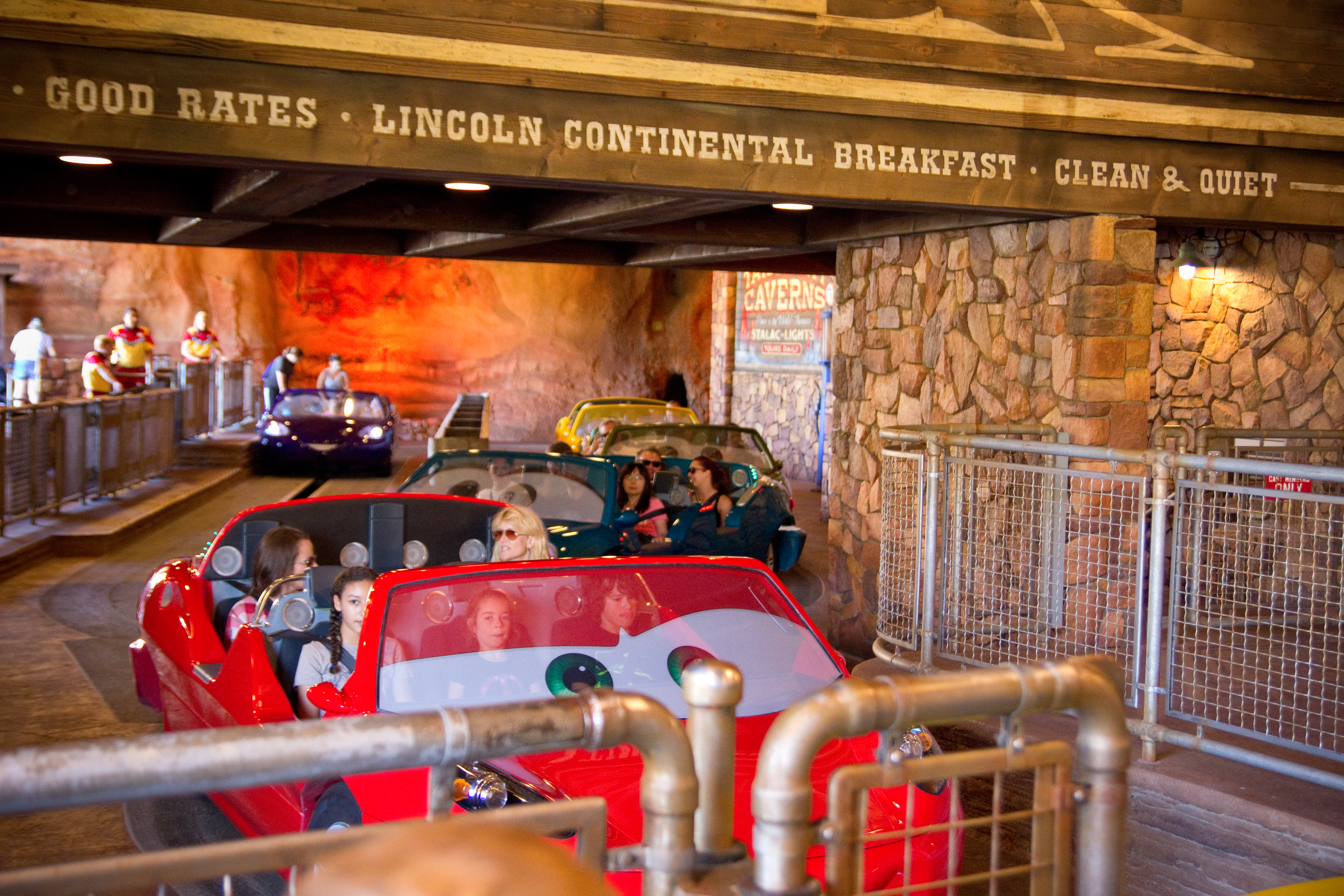
Cars waiting before the race

Leaving the motor court, the vehicle takes an idyllic drive through Ornament Valley. It then enters the dark ride portion of the attraction as guests nearly run into several Audio-animatronic vehicles. This starts with a near head-on collision with Mack, followed by near-misses with Minny and Van, and narrowly making it over a grade crossing ahead of a speeding train. As the vehicle swerves out of the way, Sheriff appears, warning the guests to slow down and follow Mater into town for the big race. Along the way, Mater takes the ride vehicles "tractor tipping", but this awakens Frank, the combine harvester, who angrily chases the riders off of his farm. The vehicle then enters the town at night and passes Fillmore, Sarge, Lizzie, and Red before being greeted by Lightning McQueen and Sally Carrera. At this point, the track splits into two, and each ride vehicle will be directed to one of the two shops before lining up at the starting line for the race. If the vehicle makes a left turn, it receives a tire change at Luigi's Casa Della Tires - the male shop; if it makes a right turn, it gets a fresh coat of paint at Ramone's House of Body Art. Both tracks then pass Doc Hudson, who is dressed in his "Hudson Hornet" livery and introduces himself as the guests' new crew chief. Once two ride vehicles have arrived at the starting line, an enthusiastic Luigi waves the flag to signal the start of the race.

Both ride vehicles then accelerate on parallel tracks out of the cave, into an outdoor segment containing bunny hills and high-banked turns around the rock formations of Ornament Valley, with the vehicles reaching a top speed of 40 mph (64 km/h). During a short drop down a sloped bank, an on-ride photo is taken. As the two racers near the finish line a randomized vehicle speeds ahead to narrowly win the race. The vehicles then enter Taillight Caverns, where Lightning and Mater congratulate both vehicles on a great race. The ride vehicles then merge back onto a single track and return to the boarding station.

== See also ==
- Test Track, located at Epcot.
- 2012 in amusement parks
- Journey to the Center of the Earth, the second generation of Test Track technology, located at Tokyo DisneySea, near Tokyo, Japan.
