= Luigi's Rollickin' Roadsters =

Attraction at Disney California Adventure

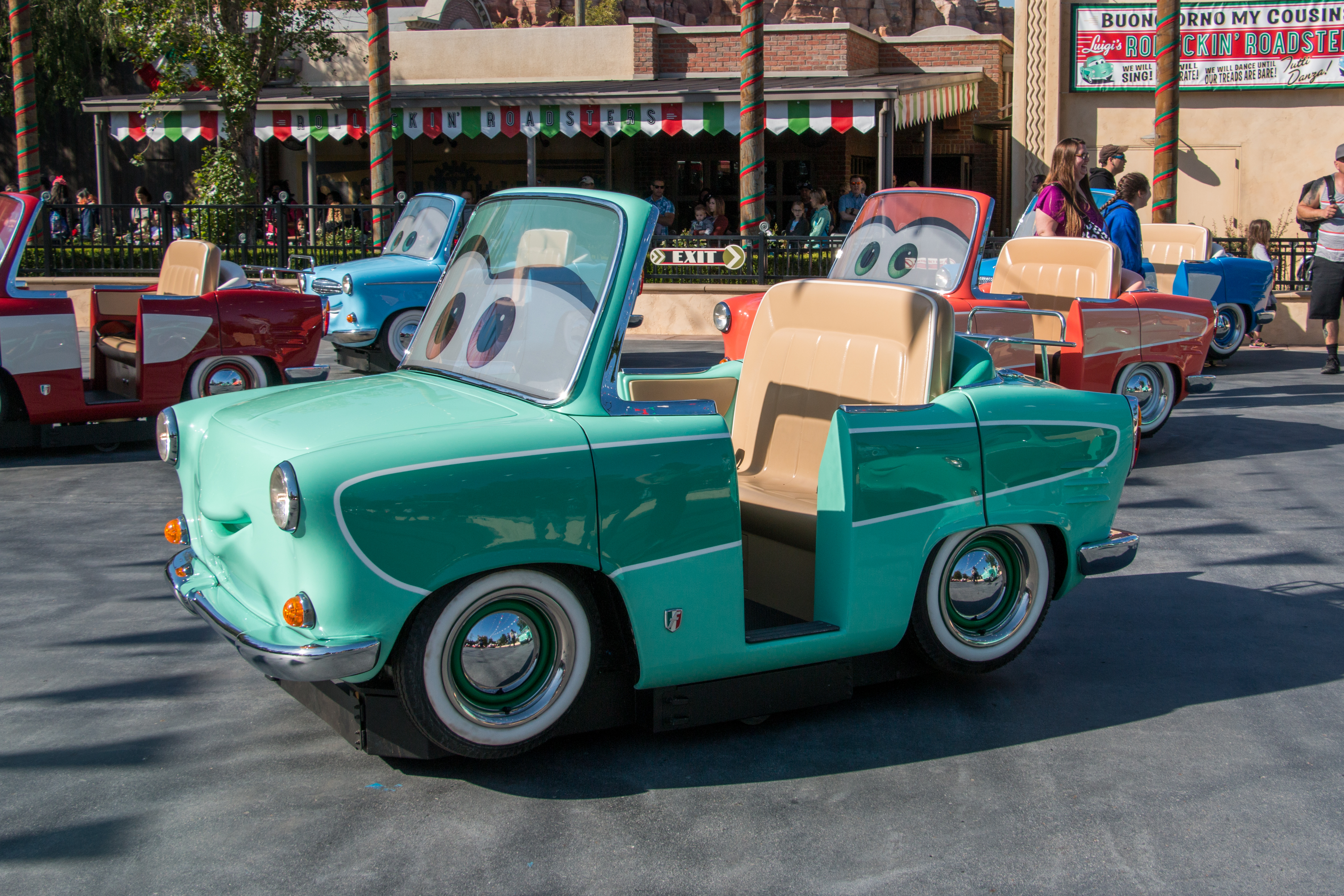
- One of Luigi's 20 cousins who he invited to dance in Radiator Springs

Disney California Adventure
- Area: Cars Land
- Status: Operating
- Opening date: March 7, 2016
- Replaced: Luigi's Flying Tires

Ride statistics
- Attraction type: Dancing cars
- Designer: Walt Disney Imagineering
- Theme: Cars
- Vehicle type: Car
- Vehicles: 20
- Riders per vehicle: 3
- Rows: 1
- Riders per row: 3
- Height restriction: 32 in (81 cm)
- Host: Luigi (voiced by Tony Shalhoub)
- Must transfer from wheelchair

Luigi's Rollickin' Roadsters is a trackless dancing cars ride located in Cars Land at Disney California Adventure. The attraction, which opened on March 7, 2016, features Luigi, the Italian roadster who runs the Casa Della Tires shop in Radiator Springs.

The attraction is the first at the Disneyland Resort to use a trackless ride system. Other ride systems in Disney Parks that use trackless technology include The Twilight Zone Tower of Terror in Walt Disney World, Pooh's Hunny Hunt and Aquatopia in Tokyo Disney Resort, Mystic Manor in Hong Kong Disneyland, and Ratatouille in Disneyland Paris.

The attraction replaced Luigi's Flying Tires, which was inspired by Disneyland's Flying Saucers attraction from the 1960s.

== Description ==
Luigi has invited his cousins from Carsoli, Italy, to Radiator Springs for a dance festival in the tire yard behind his Casa Della Tires shop. Guests ride in the car vehicles as they move and spin to Italian music.

During Halloween Time at the Disneyland Resort, the attraction transforms into Luigi's Honkin' Haul-O-Ween and during Christmas time, it becomes Luigi's Joy to the Whirl.
