= National Research Associates, Inc =

- Company type: Aerospace
- Industry: Aviation
- Founded: 1958
- Defunct: 1963
- Headquarters: Laurel, Maryland
- Key people: Melville W. Beardsley
- Products: Air Cushion Vehicles

In 1958 Melville W. Beardsley founded National Research Associates company. NRA developed and tested over 30 air cushion vehicles, with the Air Gem Air cushion vehicle produced as their first product. NRA also sold Disney's Flying Saucers attraction under license. The Company went out of business in 1963.

National Research Associates, Inc was a United States of America aircraft manufacturer...

NRA Developed Air Cushion Vehicles for the Army and Marines. In 1959 The Marine Corps signed a $40,000 contract for a 14x3 ft demonstration vehicle. NRA's development facilities were located in College Park, Maryland and Laurel, Maryland. After moving on from NRA, Beardsley spent several years contesting who had the rights to the patent of the Hovercraft concept with Christopher Cockerell.

== Aircraft ==
Summary of aircraft built by National Research Associates, Inc
Model name	First flight	Number built	Type
Aqua Gem Air Cushion Vehicle	1961	Number built	Type
