= Melville W. Beardsley =

American inventor and aeronautical engineer

- Born: 10 October 1913; Kansas City, Missouri, U.S.
- Died: 26 November 1998 (aged 85); Carmel, California, U.S.
- Education: University of Illinois
- Known for: Hovercraft

Melville Whitnel Beardsley (10 October 1913 – 26 November 1998) was the American inventor and aeronautical engineer whose pioneering efforts may have contributed to the invention of the hovercraft.

Melville Beardsley was born in Kansas City, Missouri on 10 October 1913, to George and Ella Whitnel Beardsley. His father and grandfather Beardsley were attorneys. He was the third generation of his family to graduate from the University of Illinois, where he took a degree in mechanical engineering. From childhood he was fascinated with flight, and soon after college he joined the United States Army Air Corps as a pilot. By the time World War II broke out, he was one of the Army's few experienced pilots and spent the war years as a flight instructor at Hondo Field, Texas. The United States Army (and later United States Air Force which was created out of the Army's Air Corps) sponsored post-graduate education in aeronautics and management at Georgia Tech and the University of Chicago. He was USAF project officer for Northrup's famous flying wing.

== Beardsley's Early Years in ACV Development ==
It's difficult to establish exactly when Mel Beardsley conceived the air-cushion vehicle, but he worked on a Navy hydrofoil project in southern California about 1950, and this was his first known involvement in marine vehicles. The air-cushion may have been a low-friction boat-hull solution, to which Beardsley added forced air as the missing element for the basic air-cushion vehicle.

It is certain that Beardsley and the British inventor Cockerell conceived the air-cushion vehicle independently. It was not possible for them to have known of each other's work. One may say that "the idea was in the air" and inevitable.

Beardsley's further personal research led to his patents of the early 1950s. After completing another 7 years of military service, Beardsley founded National Research Associates, Inc. (NRA) in College Park and Laurel, Maryland to build practical air-cushion vehicles. Beardsley's experiments led to the development of the skirt and peripheral air-flow, without which hovercraft are impractical. A patent dispute had developed in the early 1960s to determine who had first come up with the ACV-hovercraft concept, Cockerell or Beardsley. Ultimately Cockerell paid a settlement of $85,000 to Beardsley for his patent rights, equivalent to $925,000 in 2025 dollars, which made practical the famous Channel hovercraft.

== Beardsley Air Car Company and Skimmers, Inc. ==
Mel Beardsley still had a briefcase full of designs. One of the prototypes NRA made was the "Little Skimmer." It was a very basic solo ACV which could get up to 15 MPH. He established successively two companies in his home, Beardsley Air Car Company and Skimmers, Inc., and set out to see what market there was for sports model ACVs. Rather than add an extra engine and fan facing the rear, as in his earlier Aqua-GEM model, Beardsley conceived a single-engine, single-fan design which was a forerunner of all modern sports hovercraft.

== Later life ==
Mel Beardsley worked from 1965 to 1976 with the Naval Ship Research and Development Center (NSRDC) near Annapolis, Maryland. The large air-cushion vehicles used today by the US military are largely a product of their design and testing.

In his retirement he invented, tested, and patented the Beachbuilder system of beach erosion prevention. Beardsley died 26 November 1998, in Carmel, California.
