= Luigi's Flying Tires =

Former attraction at Disney California Adventure

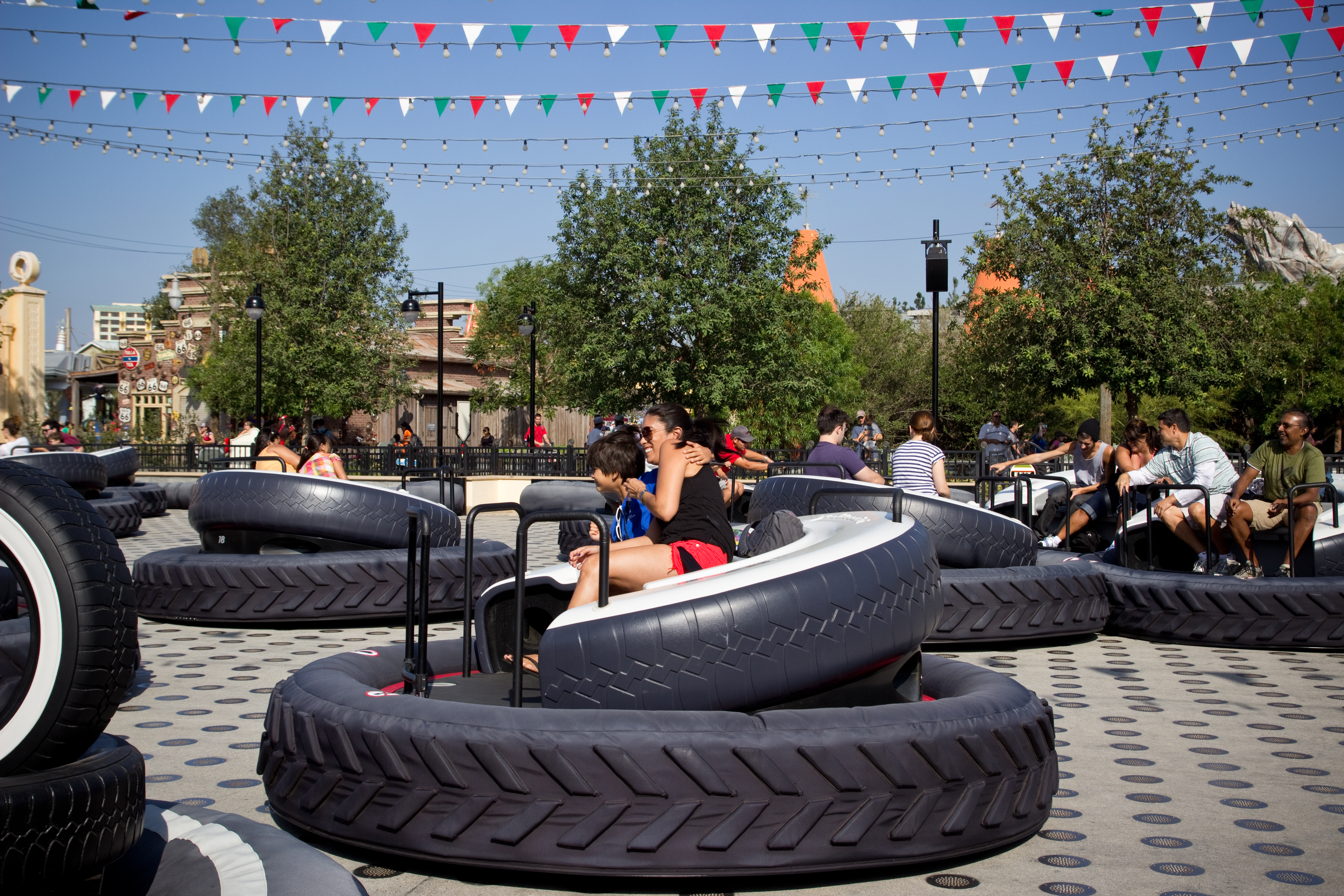
- "Bumper cars" riding within the Luigi's Flying Tires attraction

Disney California Adventure
- Area: Cars Land
- Status: Removed
- Soft opening date: Spring 2012
- Opening date: June 15, 2012
- Closing date: February 17, 2015
- Replaced by: Luigi's Rollickin' Roadsters

Ride statistics
- Attraction type: Bumper cars
- Designer: Walt Disney Imagineering
- Theme: Cars
- Vehicles: 21
- Riders per vehicle: 3
- Rows: 1
- Riders per row: 3
- Duration: ~2 minutes
- Height restriction: 32 in (81 cm)

Luigi's Flying Tires was an amusement ride in Cars Land at Disney California Adventure, at the Disneyland Resort in Anaheim, California. Guests rode on tire-shaped bumper car vehicles that floated on a cushion of air, similar to an air hockey game but also very much like a hovercraft. The ride's concept was based on Disneyland's Flying Saucers attraction from the 1960s. The attraction closed on February 17, 2015. It was replaced by Luigi's Rollickin' Roadsters.

== History ==
The attraction, originally titled "Luigi's Roamin' Tires", was announced in late 2007 along with the rest of the Cars Land multi-year expansion plans for Disney California Adventure. The ride was based on the Flying Saucers attraction that was located in Disneyland's Tomorrowland from 1961 to 1966. Instead of floating bumper cars in the shapes of flying saucers, the Luigi attraction featured bumper cars whose riders steer big levitating truck tires.

Executive Vice President of Walt Disney Imagineering Kathy Mangum said in 2011 that designing the ride, now named Luigi's Flying Tires, was not easy even with advanced technology. "I think our ride engineers, when we went to them and said, 'Hey we want people to fly', they would tell you that designing a way for aerodynamics to make that happen was actually pretty difficult", she said. Mary Niven, vice president of Disney California Adventure Park, likened the ride to an air hockey table. "It's like sitting on the table and you're the hockey puck", she said.

When the attraction initially opened on June 15, 2012, it also featured giant beach balls in an effort to give the ride a more colorful look (the attraction was originally intended to open without beach balls.) After two months, however, they were removed due to increased wait times and some "minor incidents" that occurred when visitors were hit by the beach balls, according to Niven.

On February 6, 2015, Disney announced that Luigi's Flying Tires would close on February 17 to make room for a reworked attraction. It was replaced by Luigi's Rollickin' Roadsters, which opened on March 7, 2016.

== Ride ==
The queue took visitors through Luigi's Casa Della Tires shop and out back through an Italian garden to Luigi's tire yard where the ride took place. Once seated in their tire, Luigi gave a countdown and then a compressor pumped air up through the floor's 6,714 air vents. The tires lifted about two inches off the floor, at which point riders could make their tire move by leaning in the direction that they wanted to go. The ride lasted for approximately two minutes.

== See also ==
- 2012 in amusement parks
