= It's Fun to Be Free =

Song for the World of Motion pavilion

"It's Fun to Be Free" was the ubiquitous theme song for the World of Motion pavilion at Walt Disney World's Epcot theme park. Composed by Disney staff musician Norman "Buddy" Baker with lyrics by Xavier "X" Atencio, it is notable among Disney Theme Park music for the sheer number of variations created for the ride, and the song's infectious earworm quality.

== Lyrics ==
The lyrics are written in verse pairs, with heavy rhyming patterns within that structure. Though they vary from version to version, the lyrics of the first and second verses, especially when they're the only verses sung, remain largely consistent.

== Variations ==
The ride itself used a one-minute underscore loop, which plays almost uninterrupted from the beginning scenes through the present day. Over this are played harmonies and arrangements befitting different locations (e.g. Ancient Rome, China, and Arabia) and time periods (like the Wild West, Renaissance Italy, and 1960s surf culture). The ride also utilized minimalistic sound effect segments, frenetic uptempo "speed tunnels", and a swelling orchestral finale. All of these were arranged by Buddy Baker.

Around the pavilion, and in the World of Motion's queue, load, and unload areas played a loop of eccentric versions of "It's Fun to Be Free" punctuated by vehicle noises. Musical styles represented in this loop include ragtime tack piano, dixieland jazz, Broadway showtune, 1920s Keystone Kop, Copland-esque rodeo, and kazoo. The melody of the song also made an appearance in the Concourse Themes medley, the set of bombastic orchestra and synthesizer tunes that played around Epcot Center's entrance from 1982 to 2001.

An instrumental cue from (and reference to) the song can be heard in the 2025 update to Test Track, World of Motion's successor at EPCOT's transportation pavilion.
