= Journey to the Center of the Earth (attraction) =

Attraction at Tokyo DisneySea

Coordinates: 35°37′34″N 139°53′04″E

Tokyo DisneySea
- Area: Mysterious Island
- Status: Operating
- Opening date: September 4, 2001
- Disney Premier Access available

Ride statistics
- Manufacturer: Dynamic Attractions
- Designer: Walt Disney Imagineering; General Motors Corporation (Test Track technology)
- Theme: Journey to the Center of the Earth by Jules Verne
- Speed: 47 mph (76 km/h)
- Vehicle type: Slot car ride
- Riders per vehicle: 6 (3 rows of 2 riders)
- Duration: about 3 minutes
- Height restriction: 46 in (117 cm)
- Must transfer from wheelchair

Journey to the Center of the Earth(センター・オブ・ジ・アース) is a slot car dark ride at the Tokyo DisneySea theme park in Urayasu, Chiba, Japan. One of the park's opening day attractions, it is located in the Jules Verne-themed Mysterious Island area of the park, and is loosely themed after Verne's 1864 novel of the same name. The attraction's ride system is based on the high speed slot car system originally created for the Test Track attraction opened in 1999 at Epcot in Walt Disney World. Original music for the ride was created by longtime Disney composer Buddy Baker.

== Ride Experience ==
The volcano of Mysterious Island, Mount Prometheus, has become Captain Nemo's base. After traveling through its caverns and past several of Nemo's labs (which includes a diary entry of the discovery of the fossilized egg of a monstrous, unknown arthropod), guests board "Terravators" (elevators) to the facility's base station one-half mile below. In this base station is a huge steam-powered bellows that pumps fresh air down from the surface, massive spring-pillars that hold the ceiling up to prevent cave-ins in case of earthquakes, and communication center which is currently giving warnings of increased seismic activity, but the scientist who works it is currently away on a tea break.

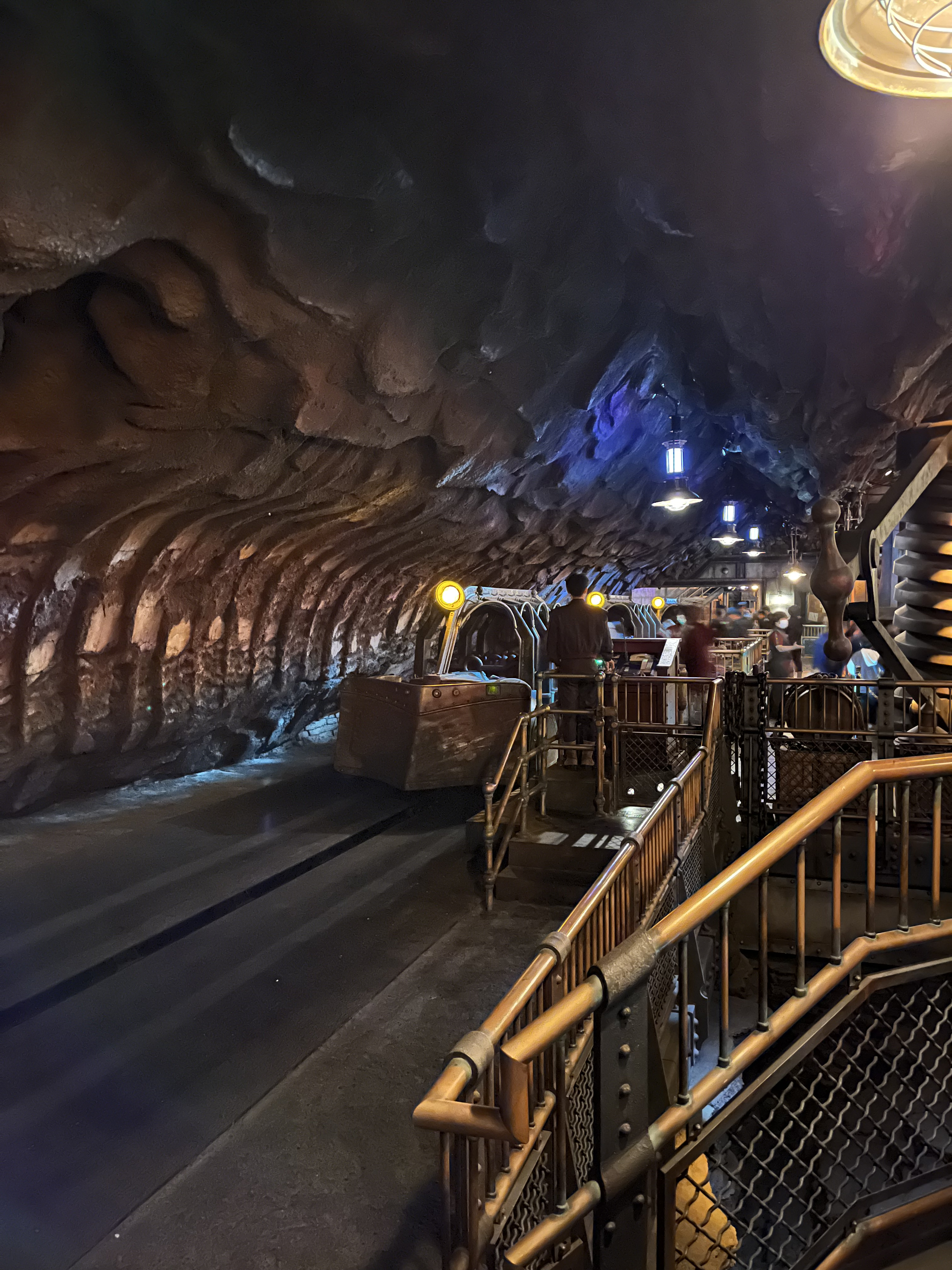

Riders then board steam-powered mine vehicles that travel through pre-drilled tunnels into the heart of the Earth. The ride begins through a cavern of colorful glowing crystals, before entering a giant Mushroom Forest, which is inhabited by strange insect and amphibian-like life forms. Before the car can proceed further, an earthquake causes a cave-in of the tunnel ahead, forcing the car off its planned route and down a side branch filled with giant egg-like sacks that appears to have been dug by a gigantic creature. The car emerges on the shore of the Subterranean Sea, and is nearly struck by a lightning from the electrified gas clouds. The finale comes when riders are forced into the fiery heart of an active volcano, where the riders come face-to-face with the giant, tyrannical centipede-like lava monster that has built a nest there, before escaping back to the surface on the wave of an eruption.

== History ==
Journey to the Center of the Earth was originally planned as a freefall ride as part of Discovery Mountain, a former Disneyland Paris concept in place of Space Mountain. Since it was never built, this project reemerged in Tokyo DisneySea with new technology from Test Track, a thrill ride through a GM testing facility at that time.

The score of the ride was composed by Buddy Baker, who was also responsible for the scores of rides such as Pirates of The Caribbean and the Haunted Mansion.

== See also ==
- Test Track, the first generation of this attraction's ride system located in Epcot at Walt Disney World.
- Radiator Springs Racers, the third generation of this attraction's ride system located in Disney California Adventure at the Disneyland Resort.
