= Test Track =

Ride at Epcot

Test Track Presented by General Motors
- The pavilion logo used since 2019, a throwback to the original pavilion logo used for World of Motion The attraction logo for the Test Track 3.0 era (2025– present)

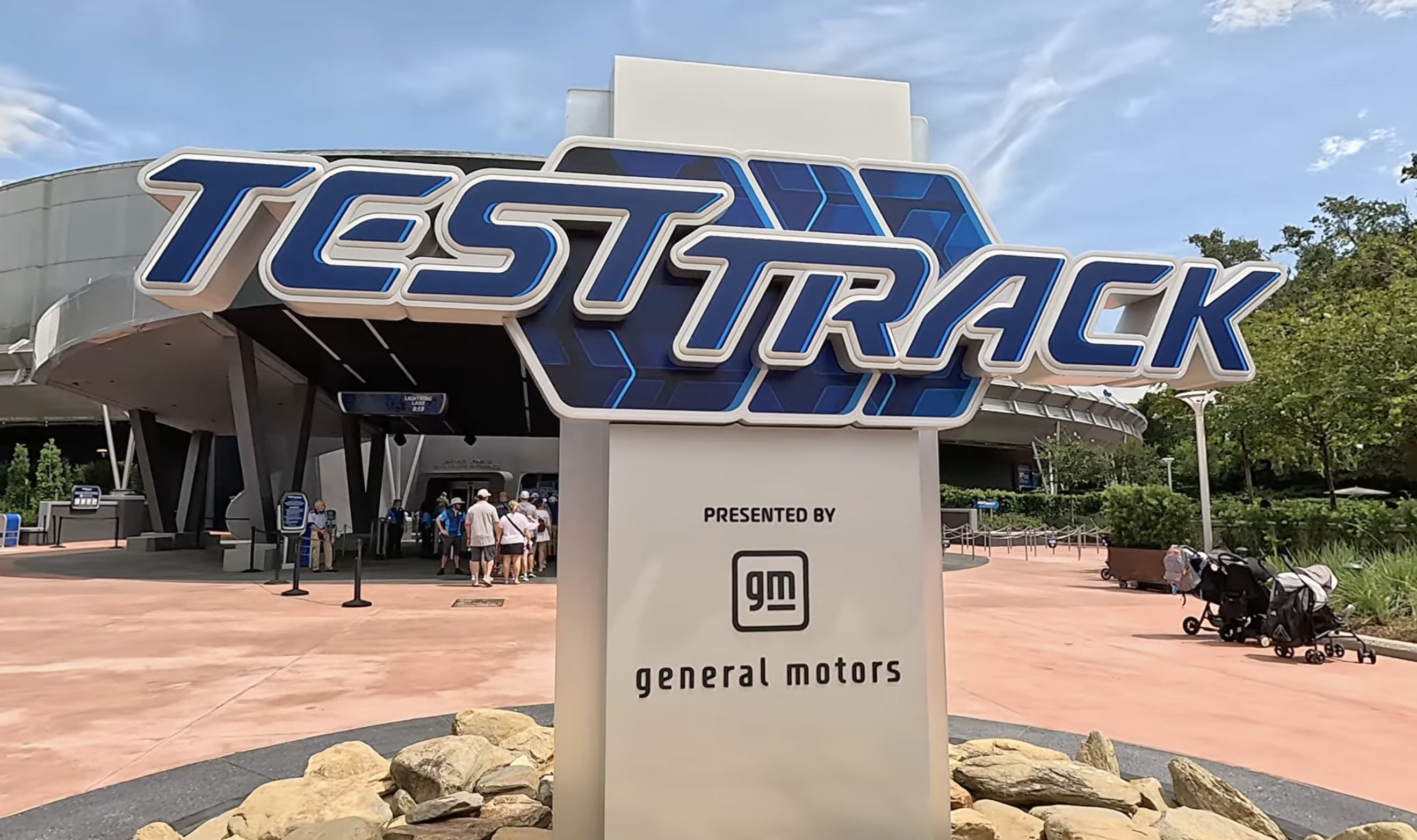
- Marquee and entrance to the attraction, pictured in 2025

Epcot
- Area: Future World (1998–2021); World Discovery (2021–present)
- Coordinates: 28.373277°N 81.547663°W
- Status: Operating
- Cost: $300,000,000 (estimated)
- Soft opening date: December 19, 1998; December 3, 2012 (2.0); July 20, 2025 (3.0)
- Opening date: March 17, 1999; December 6, 2012 (2.0); July 22, 2025 (3.0)
- Closing date: April 15, 2012 (1.0); June 17, 2024 (2.0)
- Replaced: World of Motion (Future World)

Ride statistics
- Manufacturer: Dynamic Attractions
- Designer: Walt Disney Imagineering; General Motors Corporation
- Theme: Automotive testing (1.0); Automotive engineering (2.0–3.0)
- Music: George Wilkins (1999–2012); Paul Leonard-Morgan (2012–2024); Zain Effendi (2025–present)
- Speed: 65.1 mph (104.8 km/h)
- Site area: 150,000 sq ft (14,000 m^{2})
- Vehicle type: Slot car ride
- Riders per vehicle: 6
- Rows: 2
- Riders per row: 3
- Duration: About 5 minutes
- Height restriction: 40 in (102 cm)
- Sponsors: General Motors (1999–2012, 2025–present); Chevrolet (2012–2024)
- Lightning Lane available
- Single rider line available
- Must transfer from wheelchair
- Assistive listening available
- Closed captioning available

Test Track is a high-speed slot car thrill ride manufactured by Dynamic Attractions located in World Discovery at Epcot, a theme park at the Walt Disney World Resort in Bay Lake, Florida. Designed by Walt Disney Imagineering in partnership with General Motors (GM's Chevrolet marque during its second era), the ride is a simulated excursion through the rigorous testing procedures that General Motors uses to evaluate its concept cars, culminating in a high-speed drive around the exterior of the attraction.

The attraction soft-opened to the public, as Test Track 1.0, on December 19, 1998, after a long delay due to problems revealed during testing and to changes in design. As a result, the attraction officially opened on March 17, 1999. Test Track replaced the World of Motion ride, which closed three years earlier in 1996. Originally, guests rode in "test vehicles" in a GM "testing facility" through a series of assessments to illustrate how automobile prototype evaluations were conducted. The highlight of the attraction is a speed trial on a track around the exterior of the building at a top speed of 64.9 miles per hour (104.4 km/h) making it the fastest Disney theme park attraction ever built.

Test Track 1.0 closed for refurbishment on April 15, 2012, and re-opened on December 6 in its second edition, or Test Track 2.0, sponsored by Chevrolet instead of General Motors as a whole. Guests now design their own car in the Chevrolet Design Studio. Then they board a "Sim-Car" and are taken through the "digital" testing ground of the "SimTrack". Throughout the ride, guests see how their designs performed in each test. After the ride, guests can see how their car did overall, film a commercial, race their designs, and have a picture taken with their own virtually designed vehicle with a chosen backdrop in the background. Test Track is located in World Discovery, formerly known as Future World East.

On September 9, 2023, Disney announced that Test Track would be receiving a third retheming inspired by the original World of Motion ride. Test Track 2.0 closed permanently on June 17, 2024 to make way for the ride's third iteration, Test Track 3.0, which soft-opened to the public on July 20, 2025. General Motors returned as the attraction's sponsor instead of their Chevrolet division when the ride reopened on July 22, 2025. The updated attraction showcases new vehicle technology using effects and narration, featuring a House of the Future, a forest drive, and a futuristic projection dome. The high-speed loop remains the highlight, though the "Sim-Car" technology has been completely removed. The ride, entrance plaza, and queue features music composed by Zain Effendi; the EPCOT: Test Track soundtrack was released on Walt Disney Records on August 8, 2025.

== History ==
=== Test Track 1.0, Presented by General Motors (March 1999 – April 2012) ===
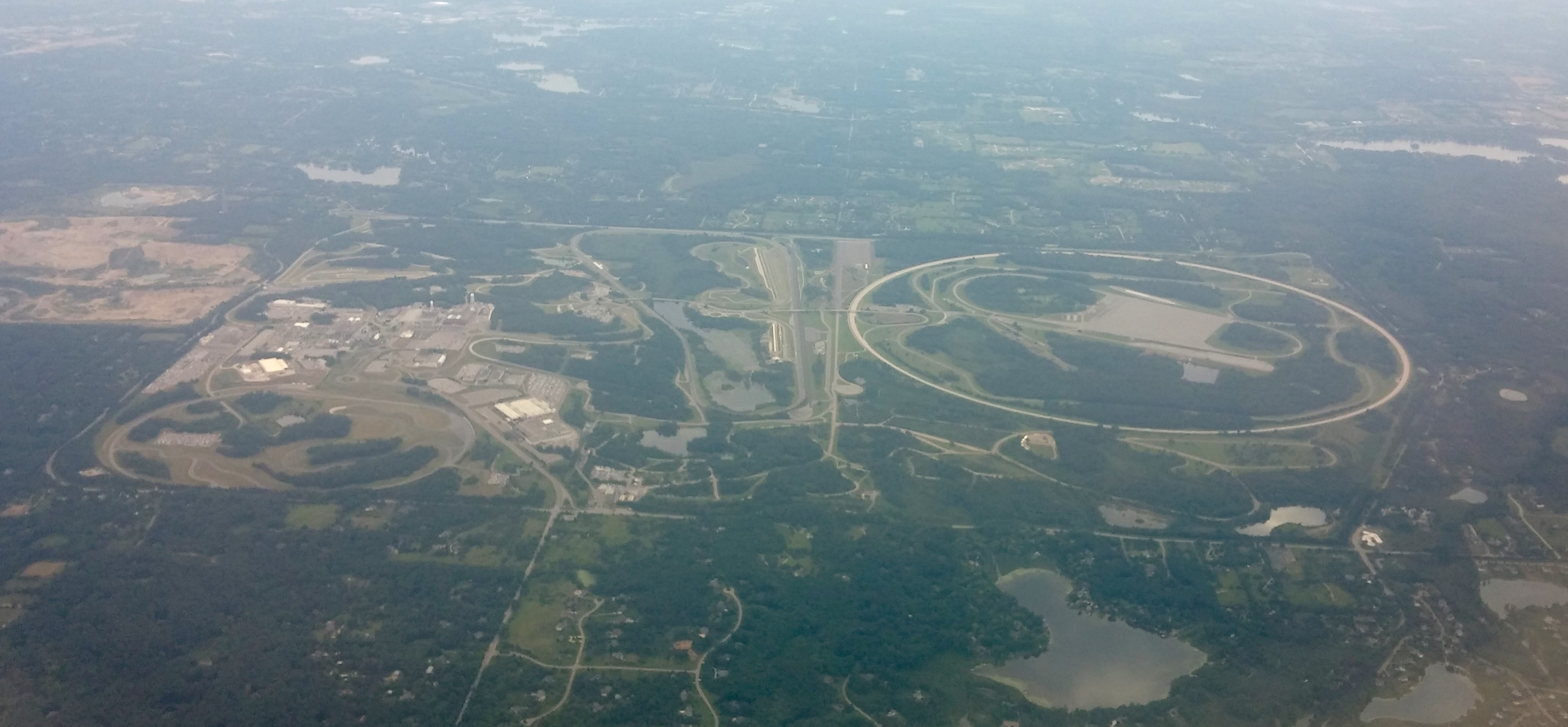
Aerial view of General Motors' Milford Proving Grounds in Milford, Michigan, which was used as a case study by Disney Imagineers for the design of Test Track.

World of Motion was an attraction that was located in the current building of Test Track and was sponsored by General Motors. When the sponsorship expired, GM was in the process of conducting lay-offs and cutbacks, forcing the company to question whether or not to sign another sponsorship agreement. Upon deciding to sign another agreement, GM wanted Disney to construct a new ride on the site of World of Motion. The new ride would focus specifically around their automobiles, rather than the fanciful history of transportation from the pre-historic (animal transportation) to the modern age (automobiles, trains, planes, etc.) that were previously housed in the space. In 1976, Disney Imagineers had visited GM's Milford Proving Grounds; the Imagineers later made a second trip to the facility as they designed Test Track. After numerous problems encountered during the construction of the ride, Test Track soft-opened on December 19, 1998, but did not officially open until March 17, 1999, nearly two years later than planned.

In November 1995, Epcot announced that World of Motion would be transformed into Test Track. After the attraction closed on January 2, 1996, everything inside the ride building was removed. Meanwhile, the elevated track was already being constructed outside and behind the building, part of the high-speed test portion of the ride. Work outside the building began in the fall of 1995, while work inside the building began in the spring of 1996. The ride was scheduled to open 29 months after World of Motion's closing, in May 1997, but after numerous problems arose, the ride opening was delayed by nearly two years. The cars used on the ride were designed to resemble the look of a test car that is used to go through multiple safety tests.

Throughout the construction of Test Track, numerous problems occurred causing delays in the ride opening. After failing to open as scheduled in May 1997, park officials announced on October 15, 1997 that the opening was delayed until at least sometime in 1998. The first problem that Imagineers had to overcome was that the wheels used on the ride vehicles could not stand up to the demand of the ride course and speed. This problem was resolved but a second, more critical issue caused the ride to be delayed by over a year. For Test Track to run with the highest hourly capacity possible, twenty-nine ride vehicles would be needed. The ride's programming system could only handle operating a maximum of six cars over the layout of the ride, and the system suffered frequent software crashes. The original software was scrapped, and eventually programmers were able to get the computer system able to run twenty-nine ride vehicles at once. Despite some rumors about rain affecting the outdoor segment, park officials assured that weather issues were not a factor in the delay. In August 1998, Disney announced that the opening of Test Track would be delayed once again. Officials told park guests that the technology was new and still being developed. Reports planned to reschedule the opening for 1999. After the problems were resolved, Test Track soft-opened to the public on December 19, 1998. The ride was still prone to breakdowns and did not officially open until March 17, 1999.

Even after its grand opening, the ride still suffered from frequent downtime, although efficiency gradually improved. Shortly after its opening, to improve capacity, Test Track was one of the first rides at the Disney parks to employ a dedicated single rider line. The six-seated cars had often been left with empty seats, as most riders arrived in groups of two or four. The single rider line helped each car leave full and reduce long lines. In November 1999, Epcot added a FASTPASS entrance to Test Track.

=== Test Track 2.0, Presented by Chevrolet (December 2012 – June 2024) ===
On January 6, 2012, Disney Parks announced plans to renovate Test Track during the second and third quarters of the year and re-open the ride by fall 2012. As part of the update, Test Track's sponsor became General Motors' Chevrolet marque instead of GM as a whole. The new additions include a pre-show area where guests "design" a new car for testing in the Chevrolet Design Center, then they board Test Track's existing six-passenger ride vehicles, to be known as "SimCars", to see how their design fares on the Center's driving course. The experience concludes in a renovated showroom featuring current and future Chevrolet products. The ride vehicles were repainted and while the track was unchanged, the setting was overhauled. On April 27, 2012, Walt Disney's social media manager Jennifer Fickley-Baker released a set of concept design photos. Within the photos, it was confirmed that the ride will have 4 main tests: capability, efficiency, responsiveness, and power. The ride closed on April 15, 2012 and soon later, barriers were placed along all walkways leading to either the entrance or exit of the ride. Also, a musical show called "Test Track All Stars" was added in front of the former main entrance to Test Track, which closed on December 4, 2012. The refurbished attraction first opened to guests during a soft opening on December 3, 2012. The grand re-opening took place on December 6, 2012.

Test Track was closed on January 13, 2020 for a refurbishment. It then reopened a month later on February 26. On July 22, 2020, it was announced that the attraction was reopened again, since all Walt Disney World parks was temporarily closed on March 16, 2020, due to the COVID-19 pandemic's effect on Florida. On September 2, the attraction was shut down again due to technical issues.

=== Test Track 3.0, Presented by General Motors (2025–present) ===
On September 9, 2023, it was announced on the Disney Parks Blog that Test Track would be receiving another retheming, inspired by the original World of Motion attraction at Epcot. Further concept art was released on April 5, 2024, before the attraction closed on June 17, 2024. In December 2024, General Motors announced that it would resume its sponsorship of Test Track when the ride reopened.

On June 16, 2025, it was announced that the third iteration of Test Track would be set to reopen on July 22, 2025, with new scenes, a new musical score and more. Previews for Cast Members started on June 27 and ended on July 10, with previews for the public hosted in the days before the official reopening. Test Track 3.0 officially reopened on July 20, 2025.

== Ride overview ==
=== 1999–2012 ===
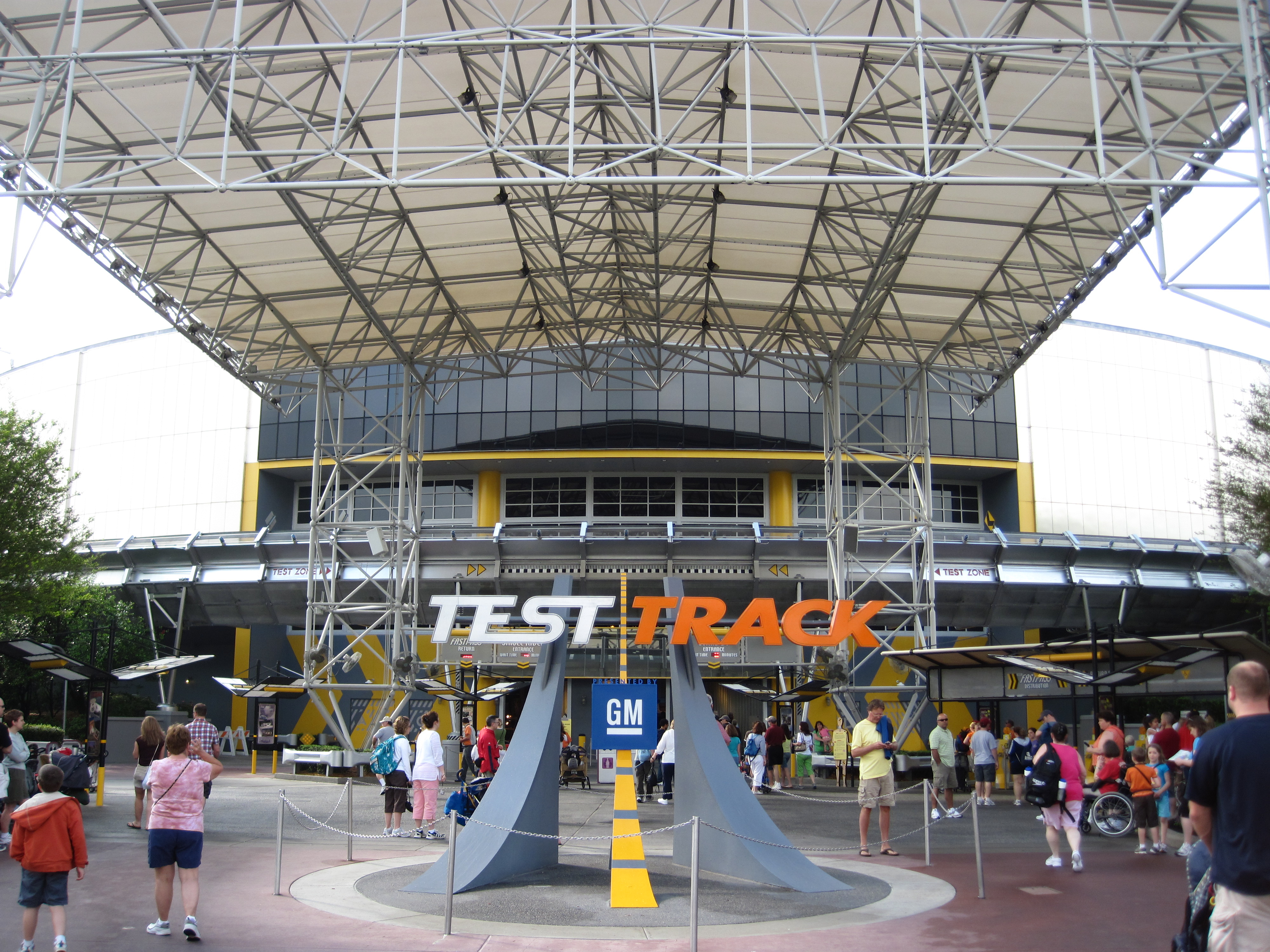
Entrance to Test Track before the 2012 refurbishment.

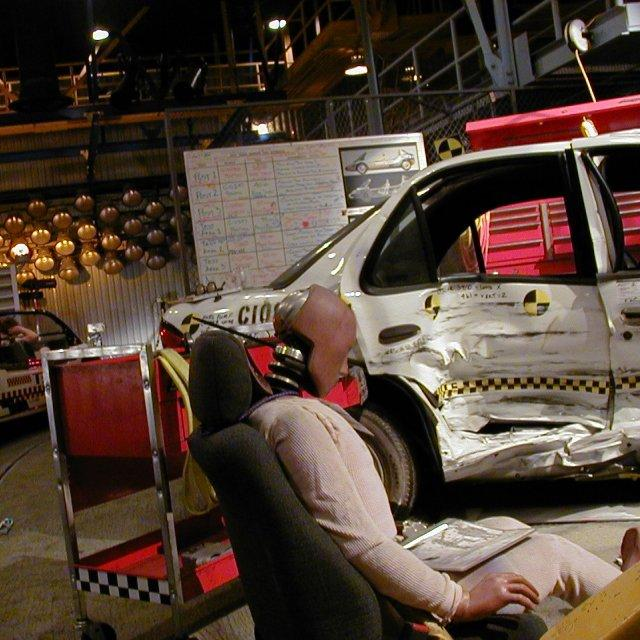
The interior of Test Track shows a simulated test lab, including test dummies and damaged cars before the 2012 refurbishment.

==== Queue ====
During the first part of the queue, guests viewed a sample repair and test shop. As guests entered the queue in the welcome center they were shown tests performed on cars and parts before being released. The queue wound by different tests for tires and car doors, an anechoic chamber for radio receivers, and an area for crash test dummies to be tested. At the end of the queue, a group of guests would be brought into a briefing room where they were shown automobile testing facilities and examples of tests being performed. The host, Bill McKim (John Michael Higgins) told the guests that they would take part in some of these tests and also told the technician Sherrie what tests to set up. Small videos of each test were shown as he spoke. He finally told her to choose one final "surprise test," and a video of a car crashing into a barrier was shown as a door opened for guests to enter the interior queue.

==== Ride ====
Upon reaching the end of the second queue, guests were loaded into test cars. Upon dispatching from the loading dock, the car was brought through an accelerated hill climb. Next, the car's suspension was tested over different types of road surfaces, including German and Belgian blocks & cobblestones. Next, the car's anti-lock braking system was turned off and the car tried to navigate a course of cones, knocking many over in the process. The anti-lock brakes were then turned back on and a similar cone course was navigated easily. Guests were shown a video overlay of the difference. Then, the cars were brought through three environmental chambers: the heat chamber (featuring 192 heat lamps), the cold chamber, and the corrosion chamber (featuring robots on both sides that spray yellow mist).

The handling of the car was then tested. It climbed a set of hills with blind turns while increasing its speed by 10% each time. At the top, the car almost crashes into an oncoming semi-truck before swerving out of the way. The car was now brought to the final test shown in the briefing room: the barrier test. The car lined up across from a barrier and began to accelerate towards it. Just before hitting the barrier a series of bright lights illuminated and the barrier opened to a track outside. The car traveled along a straightaway into a boot-shaped turnaround over an employee parking lot, then took a lap around the building with banked turns and a max speed of 64.9 mph (104.6 km/h). As the car returned to the loading dock, a thermal scan was taken of the guests and shown on a large screen.

Like many Disney attractions, Test Track exited into a themed gift shop featuring merchandise associated with the attraction. Guests could also view and purchase photos taken of their vehicle on the ride or scan their Photopass to view or purchase the photos later. There was also an area where there was a showroom of the all-new, prototype, or legendary GM vehicles.

==== Post-show: The Assembly Experience ====
Experience designer Bob Rogers and the design team BRC Imagination Arts, were commissioned to create the new post-show experience entitled "The Assembly Experience." The Assembly Experience is a walk-through environment, giving guests the illusion that they are on the floor of a vast automotive assembly plant. Automotive doors, seats and engines glide overhead on assembly line chainveyors, while simulated automotive die-press caused the floor to "rumble" as each automotive part was pressed. Video monitors provided real GM workers a chance to tell EPCOT visitors how they felt about their products and their work.

=== 2012–2024 ===
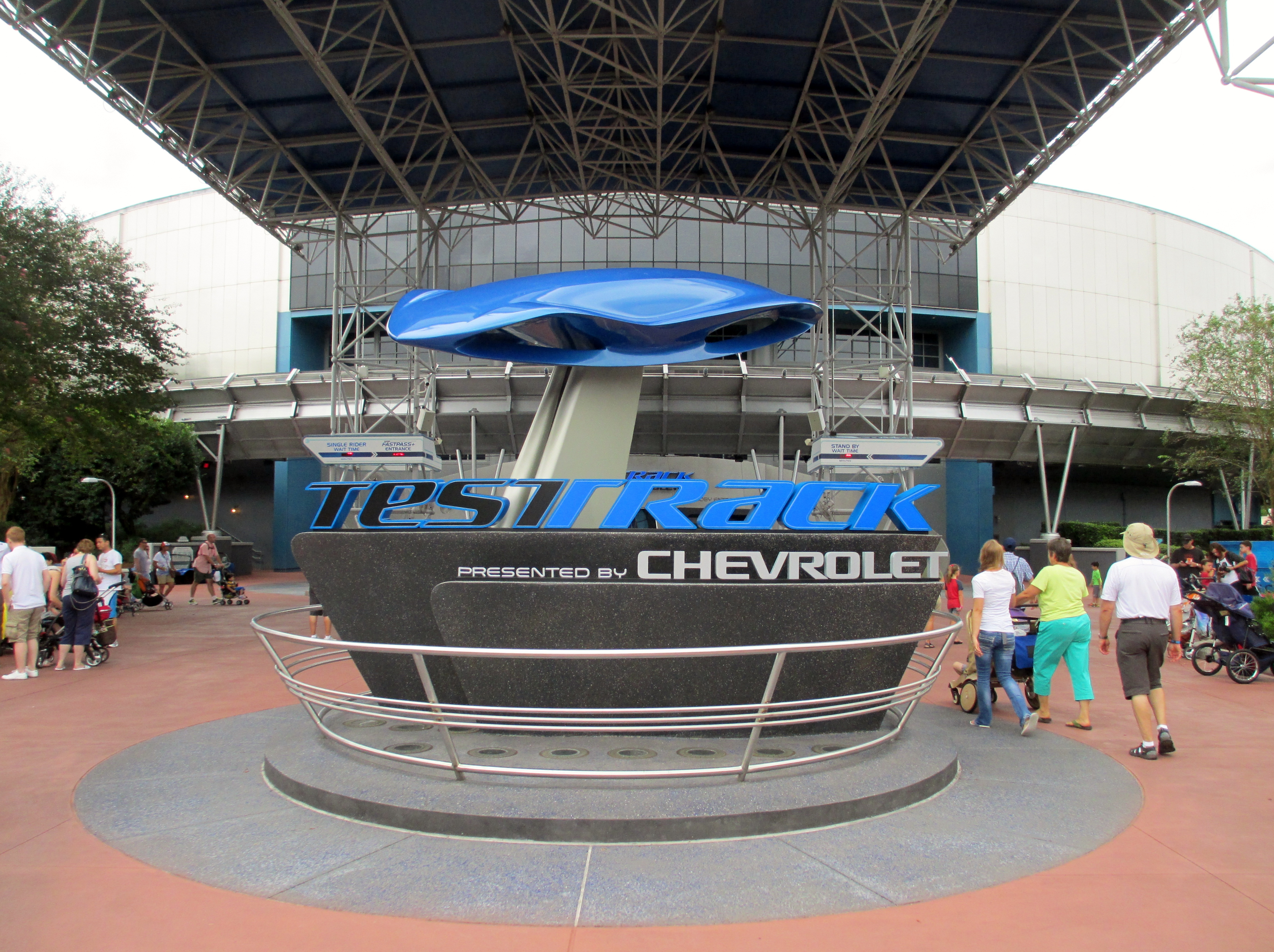
Entrance to Test Track before the 2024–2025 refurbishment.

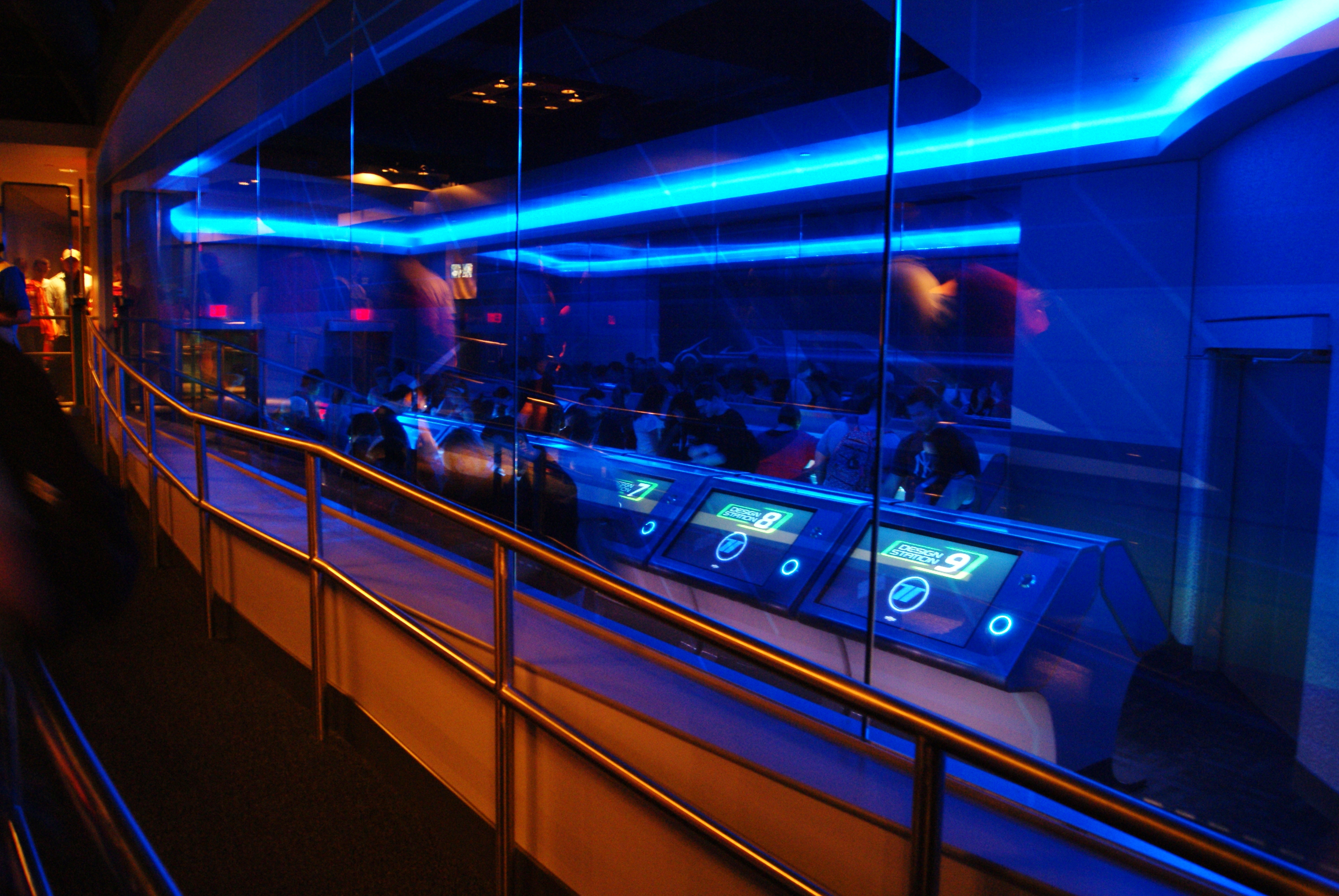
One of the two Design Studios before the 2024–2025 refurbishment.

==== Queue ====
The first queue uses the same area as the old but is themed to the Chevrolet Design Studio at EPCOT. "Designers" (as the Test Track Technicians call the guests) pass by two concept cars, the Chevrolet Miray, and the Chevrolet EN-V. Afterwards, the standby queue leads to a section where a small model car is drawn on through projections while one of Chevrolet's employees discusses the design process for cars. Then the standby queue goes by large touchscreens where designers can take tutorials on how to design a car. Once at the front of the queue, designers use their MagicBand, park ticket, or receive a white RFID card called a "design key" and wait for a set of doors to open leading into one of the two design studios. Once in the studio, designers have a set amount of time (depending on how busy the attraction is) to design their own "Chevrolet Custom Concept Vehicle" that will be tested on the sim-track based on four performance attributes: Capability, Efficiency, Responsiveness or Power. Once the time expires, designers move to the second queue which leads to the boarding area. For Lightning Lane designers, the queue goes directly to the main design studios. For single riders, guests use their MagicBand, ticket, or a design key to select a pre-designed vehicle from one of the four performance attributes: Capability, Efficiency, Responsiveness or Power. Once guests select their vehicle, they move to the same second queue. While waiting to board the sim-cars, all designers must scan their MagicBand, ticket, or design key again at the gate to upload their Chevrolet Custom Concept Vehicle to the sim-car.

==== Ride ====
Once the gates open, designers board the sim-cars and fasten their seat belts; they will be checked and dispatched by a Test Track technician. Afterwards, designers' cars take them through the digital testing environment of the Sim-Track. Along the way, designers will find out how their design choices directly affect their Chevrolet Custom Concept Vehicle's performance numbers by undergoing four different tests: capability, efficiency, responsiveness and power.

In the capability test, the car first connects to OnStar, while passing a snowflake on the left which is composed of World of Motion logos, then accelerates past a rain projection and skids out of control. Next, the continuing path disappears and the sim-car turns around to speed up again. A short time later, the sim-car makes a sharp left turn as a lightning bolt strikes. The car then passes by a futuristic city, which is an unintentional reference to CenterCore, an amazing city of the future from World of Motion. Following the capability test, the results of which car designs scored the best in the test are displayed.

The sim-car then begins the efficiency test. In the first part, the sim-cars are scanned for "optimum eco-efficiency". The second test performs an aero-dynamic test on the vehicle. Finally, "hyper-spectrum imaging" takes place. On either sides of the walls, designers can spot a WED Performance text inscribed on one of the tires, in honor of W.E.D., Walter Elias Disney's initials and the original name of Walt Disney Imagineering, the division of the company that built theme parks. There are numerous websites, along with a Hidden Mickey that is difficult to find. Just like the capability test, after the efficiency test is complete, the best scores are displayed.

The third test, responsiveness, is next. The sim-car accelerates around hairpin turns with laser-projected trees. After the first right turn, a sign on the left can be seen that says: Motion Lane 82, General Motorway 99, Bowtie Boulevard 12; all of which reference the three attractions that have been in the building and their opening years. Afterwards, two more signs can be seen after a few more turns, one with the "turn right to go left" quote from the 2006 Disney Pixar film Cars, and one with "Beaver X-ing", referencing a GM plant in Beaverton Oregon, where Imagineers visited GM employees to help with the original Test Track. The sim-car then enters a tunnel to encounter the 18-wheeler from the original version though it is now shown with lasers. When the vehicle exits the tunnel, the results for the responsiveness test are displayed and all of the test icons are displayed.

The final test is power where the sim-car stops for a moment. It then accelerates through flashing purple arches towards a wall with the ride's logo on it. The doors split open and the car exits the building. Designers can spot a sign with the number 82 referencing EPCOT and World of Motion's opening year just before the drop. This is followed by another one with a futuristic city picture, which is a reference to World of Motion's CenterCore. The sim-car accelerates along a straightaway until it crosses over Avenue of the Stars as guests get their pictures taken. Designers can spot another sign that pays tribute to World of Motion, this time with the logo and the "FN2BFRE" text, referencing to the former ride's theme song, It's Fun to be Free, at which point the sim-car makes a 90 degree right turn, then a 270 degree left turn circling over a cast member parking lot. Exiting the turn, the sim car then travels back down another straightaway before making a complete counterclockwise circle around the ride building. When the test is complete, the vehicle descends through a tunnel where the power test results are displayed overhead, and back to the loading station where the next group of designers board.

==== Post-show ====
Designers can then use their MagicBand, ticket, or design key that has their Chevrolet Custom Concept Vehicle that they made in the Design Studio to see their scores from the ride, play games and make an ad in the "Chevrolet Showroom." In the showroom, designers can also check out some of the newest Chevrolet vehicles, take virtual photos with their custom-designed cars and make Sim-Car cards with their cars using their MagicBand, ticket, or design key. There is also a gift shop located at the exit like the original version of the ride.

Many World of Motion logos can be found throughout the attraction. These logos are references to the old attraction and can be found on trash bins, murals, the attraction's main sign, and signage directing EPCOT guests to the attraction.

=== 2025–present ===
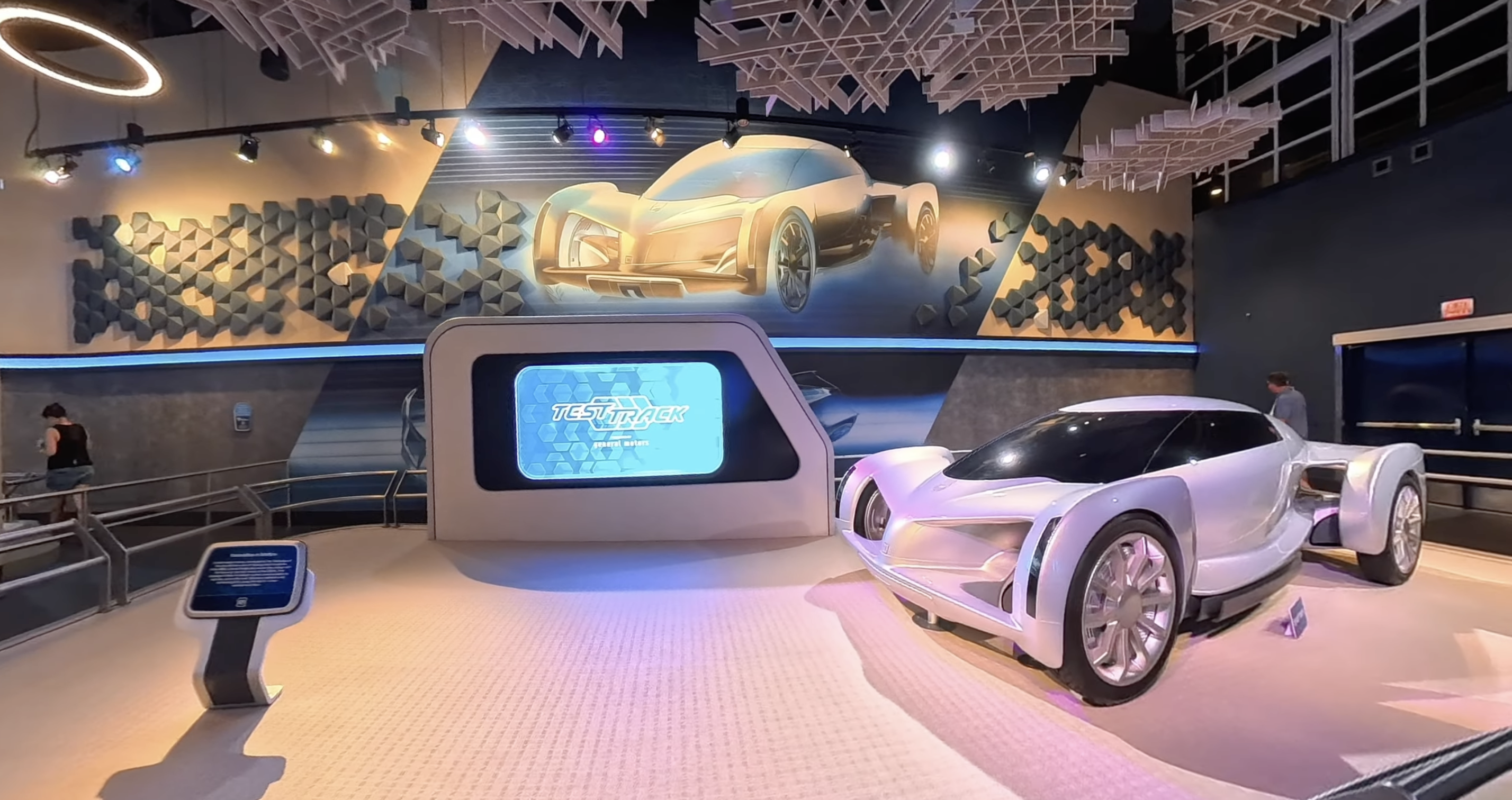
A concept car being displayed in the queue area after the 2024–2025 refurbishment.

==== Queue ====
The queue is a space dedicated to the history and future of mobility, primarily centered around automobiles. Guests pass concept cars and related objects with informational plaques detailing them. The Design Studio preshow and car-design features from the previous version have been removed.

==== Ride ====
The ride begins as guests pass the seatbelt check and look through a window at the opening queue. The car speeds up a hill as guests are introduced to two narrators, one of which being the AI test vehicle itself.

The car enters a city landscape, which the car transforms to a lidar perspective. The car accelerates and swerves past a another vehicle. Guest-view goes dark until a smart-charging road appears, and the car speeds through the terminal.

The car then approaches a futuristic house as the narrator describes a future where one can design and modify their own car from home. The car passes mirrors while the AI applies various designs, making the car look different as it passes each mirror, an ode to a similar effect in World of Motion.

The car then enters a wooded highway area where the narrator lets the AI take a drive in which she responds, "It's always fun to be free." The car slowly speeds up as it makes turns around the woods. The car then enters a tunnel where it has a near miss with a semi truck.

The car approaches a futuristic car describing the possibilities of the future. It enters a giant dome projecting images of a futuristic city with flying cars. After a small stop, the car then fully accelerates into the outdoor portion going through the out and back loop before slowly returning to the station. Unlike earlier versions of the ride, the wall to the outside was previously permanently open. This is due to an incident during the cast member previews for the re-opening of the ride where the sliding doors did not slide open and the ride vehicle crashed into them, injuring the riders on board. However, as of early August 2026, the sliding doors now operate normally.

Before reaching the station, the narrator and AI thank guests and encourage them to check out the post show.

==== Post-show ====
A themed mural is located at the exit to the attraction as a callback to the original style of circa-1982 EPCOT Center. Like the previous version, the World of Motion logo is prominent, being used as the attraction's official symbol instead of an easter egg. It can be found on signage directing EPCOT guests to the attraction and the attraction's main sign.

== See also ==
- 2012 in amusement parks
- Epcot attraction and entertainment history
- Journey to the Center of the Earth, the second generation of Test Track technology, located at Tokyo DisneySea, at Tokyo, Japan.
- Radiator Springs Racers, a similar attraction at Disney California Adventure themed after the Cars franchise.
