= Slot car ride =

Type of theme park ride

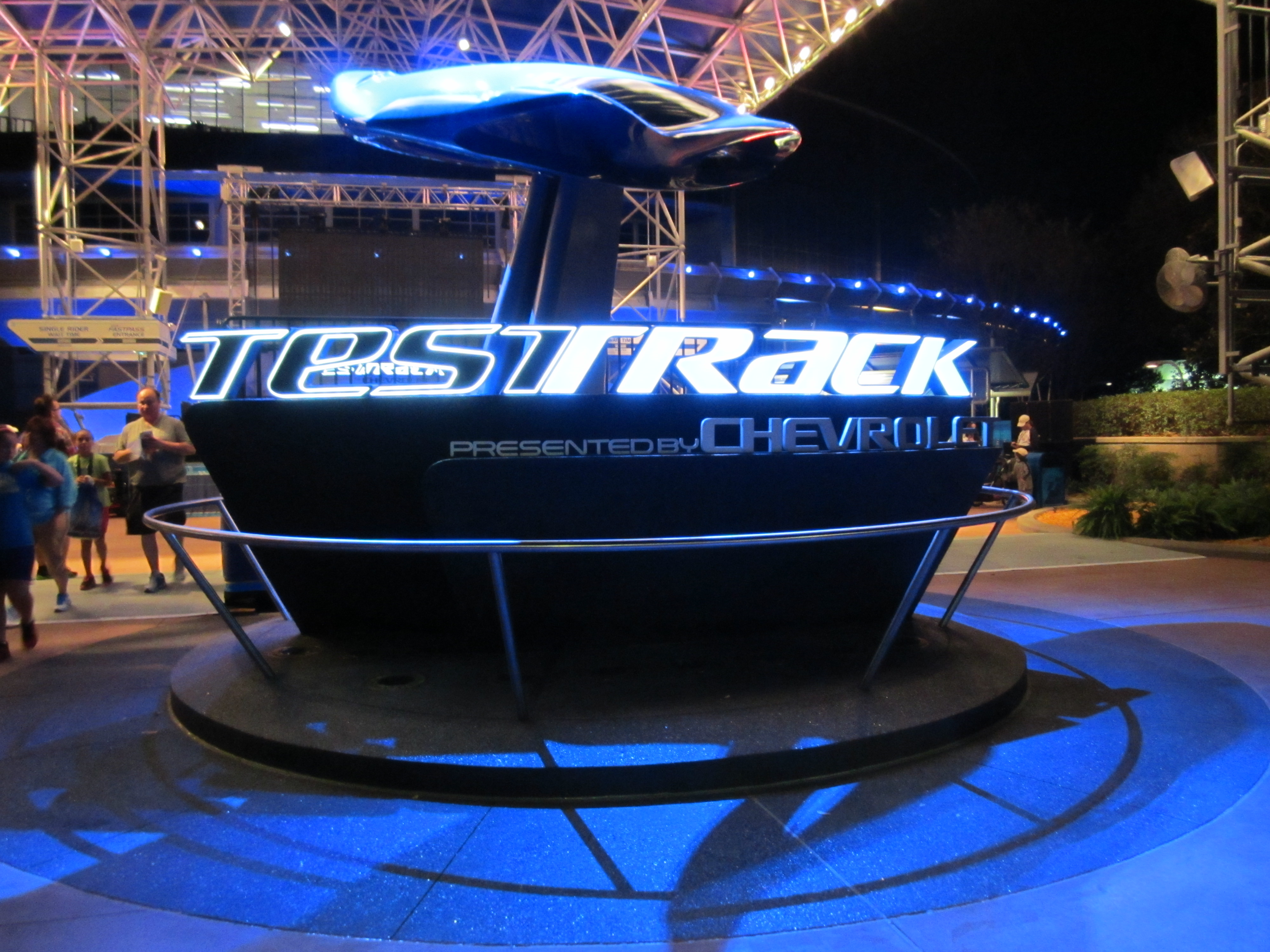
Test Track, a slot car ride at Epcot, Walt Disney World

Slot car rides are amusement park rides that are propelled by an onboard electric motor through a slot car track, speeding up and slowing down to entertain the rider.

Walt Disney Imagineering invented the technology, first implemented in 1999, with Test Track at Epcot. Test Track was a success, and they followed it up with Journey to the Center of the Earth at Tokyo DisneySea in 2001, and again with Radiator Springs Racers at Disney California Adventure in 2012.
