= Indiana Jones Adventure =

Attraction at Disney parks

Indiana Jones Adventure attractions
- Disneyland attraction poster art by Drew Struzan

Disneyland
- Name: Indiana Jones Adventure: Temple of the Forbidden Eye
- Area: Adventureland
- Coordinates: 33.8098°N 117.9213°W
- Status: Operating
- Soft opening date: March 3, 1995
- Opening date: March 4, 1995
- Lightning Lane available

Tokyo DisneySea
- Name: Indiana Jones Adventure: Temple of the Crystal Skull
- Area: Lost River Delta
- Coordinates: 35.62627°N 139.88092°E
- Status: Operating
- Opening date: September 4, 2001

Disney's Animal Kingdom
- Name: Indiana Jones and the Myth of the Jade Serpent
- Area: Tropical Americas
- Coordinates: 28°21′18.71″N 81°35′17.96″W
- Status: Under construction
- Opening date: 2027
- Replaced: Dinosaur

Ride statistics
- Attraction type: Dark ride
- Manufacturer: MTS Systems Corporation
- Designer: Walt Disney Imagineering
- Theme: Indiana Jones
- Music: John Williams
- Length: 2,500 ft (760 m)
- Speed: 14 mph (23 km/h)
- Site area: 57,400 sq ft (5,330 m^{2})
- Vehicle type: Enhanced motion vehicle
- Vehicles: 14
- Riders per vehicle: 12
- Rows: 3
- Riders per row: 4
- Duration: 3:25
- Height restriction: 46 in (117 cm)
- Ride host: Sallah (John Rhys-Davies/Bob Joles; California); Paco (voiced by Katsuhisa Hōki; Tokyo)
- Must transfer from wheelchair
- Assistive listening available
- Closed captioning available

Indiana Jones Adventure is an enhanced motion vehicle dark ride attraction based on the Indiana Jones film series, located at Disneyland and Tokyo DisneySea. Guests accompany intrepid archaeologist Dr. Indiana Jones on a turbulent quest, aboard military troop transport vehicles, through a dangerous subterranean lost temple guarded by a supernatural power.

The attraction premiered as Temple of the Forbidden Eye at Disneyland in Anaheim, California on March 3, 1995, and opened to the general public on March 4, 1995. A second, and nearly identical, version of the ride opened as Temple of the Crystal Skull on September 4, 2001, at Tokyo DisneySea in Chiba, Japan, unrelated to the 2008 film Indiana Jones and the Kingdom of the Crystal Skull. Another Indiana Jones attraction, titled Myth of the Jade Serpent, will replace Dinosaur at Disney's Animal Kingdom in Bay Lake, Florida, featuring a new story involving Indiana Jones in search of a mythical creature in a Mayan temple.

== History ==
Because of the success of Indiana Jones Epic Stunt Spectacular! at Disney's Hollywood Studios in Bay Lake, Florida, Walt Disney Imagineering and George Lucas collaborated once again to create a new Indiana Jones-themed attraction for Disneyland Park in Anaheim, California. Unlike the previous collaboration, this attraction was created with a backstory "set in the Lost Delta of India, circa 1935". Indiana Jones Adventure is the fourth collaboration between Disney and Lucasfilm, after the Disneyland attractions Captain EO, Star Tours, and Indiana Jones Epic Stunt Spectacular! and prior to Disney buying Lucasfilm (and thus the Indiana Jones franchise).

Several early concepts were considered, including a walk-through adventure and a high-speed mine car adventure within a temple. To avoid a long queue, Imagineers considered using Jungle Cruise launches to shuttle guests to the loading area.

The team tested key show elements in a Burbank warehouse on a full-sized elevated track that resembled a freeway. This enabled the team to test set pieces, lighting, effects, transport clearances, and motion profiles.

Groundbreaking for the Temple of the Forbidden Eye occurred in August 1993, with more than 400 Imagineers working on its design and construction. Tony Baxter led a core project team of nearly 100 Imagineers. During the attraction's construction, Dale Burner served as Disneyland's vice president of Facilities, Engineering and Construction. To create space for the 0.5-mile (0.80 km) queue area and the 50,000-square-foot (4,600 m^{2}) show building, an area of the former "Eeyore" parking lot was demolished, and the Monorail and Jungle Cruise attractions were rerouted. Disney filed for patent on the ride-system on November 16, 1995. Harrison Ford was asked to reprise his role as Indiana Jones, but ultimately negotiations to secure Ford's participation broke down in December 1994 for unknown reasons. Instead, Dave Temple provided the voice of Jones. Ford's physical likeness, however, has nonetheless been used in subsequent audio-animatronic figures.

The Temple of the Forbidden Eye premiered on March 3, 1995. Among the invited celebrity guests were George Lucas, Michael Eisner (Disney CEO at the time), Dan Aykroyd, Arnold Schwarzenegger, Brendan Fraser, Wayne Gretzky, Elliott Gould, Keenen Ivory Wayans, Dennis Miller, Lindsay Wagner, Tony Danza and Carrie Fisher. To promote the opening of the attraction, the Disney Channel produced a half hour-long TV program entitled Indiana Jones Adventure featuring Karen Allen and John Rhys-Davies reprising their roles from Raiders of the Lost Ark. Forty days prior to the attraction's opening, a "Forty Years of Adventure" promotion giveaway of 40 unique annual trading cards began. Guests with valid paid admission received a voucher at the main gate turnstile to exchange for the card of the day, each in a series featuring the landmark attraction of the year starting with 1955. The last card was distributed on March 2, 1995. A special "41st" card of larger issue featured the Indiana Jones Adventure on March 3. Artist Drew Struzan produced a one-sheet poster in the same theme as the films, using permission from Ford to use his likeness. The adventure opened to general admission on March 4.

AT&T Corporation sponsored construction of the attraction and the first seven years of operation, from 1995 to 2002. One of three styles of Marabic decoder cards was distributed to each guest, advertising their promotional campaign on the back. "It's great to have AT&T as presenting sponsor," said then-Disneyland President Paul Pressler. "With Disneyland celebrating its 40th Anniversary and preparing to open its most exciting attraction, we welcome the opportunities this relationship is sure to create." The attraction currently has no sponsor.

The ride was temporarily closed on September 4, 2012 for an extensive refurbishment and re-opened on December 7, 2012. Scheduled modifications included enhancements to lighting, paint, figure animation and other effects. In 2013, the idol of Mara that appears in the Hall of Promise scene was updated with projection mapping effects.

On November 19, 2019, Disney announced a $300,000 refurbishment that would happen sometime in early 2020.

On January 9, 2023, the version at Disneyland went through another refurbishment, and re-opened on March 17, 2023, which included a freshening up of the audio-animatronics and projections, and a new projected scene of a tunnel collapsing replacing the original rat cave scene.

=== Ride system ===
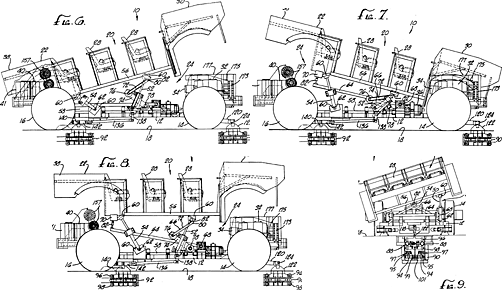
Diagrams showing the range of motion of an enhanced motion vehicle

Guests board an Enhanced Motion Vehicle (EMV) intended to appear as a battered military troop transport. EMVs ride on neoprene-filled tires for operational precision. The tires are driven by hydraulic rotors that provide forward motion, and hydraulic pressure is applied onboard each vehicle at 3,000 pounds per square inch (21,000 kPa) using DC pressurizers. The vehicle has four-wheel steering atop the surface of a slotted roadbed. The track has only three switches: a left/right split switch just before loading/unloading, a left/right combine switch just after safety check station/dispatch and a compound switch to swap vehicles in/out of the maintenance bay, behind the mirrors. Beneath the slot a tubular guideway guides the front wheelset and a damper for the rear wheelset, and three electrical buss bars provide the EMV 480 volts AC. The power is divided among the two motion systems, control, safety, and audio systems. Each transport can accommodate twelve guests with three rows of four seats each, with the front-left seat behind a non-operational steering wheel.

Each troop transport is a motion simulator which travels at a maximum speed of just over 14 miles per hour (23 km/h) atop a slotted roadbed / guiderail track. The transport car body is attached by three hydraulic rams to the frame of the chassis, which allows the shell to articulate independently. A guest's physically intense experience is programmed to achieve the illusion of greater speed and catastrophic mechanical failure using the enhanced-motion vehicle's ability to add several feet (metres) of lift then rapidly descend, shudder and tremble, and intensify cornering with counterbank and twist. The intensity of each experience varies as the on-board computer constantly chooses between pre-programmed intensity versions already stored in its memory as it traverses the show building with its load of guests.

This ride system was invented specially for the Indiana Jones Adventure and has been implemented in one other attraction: Dinosaur, located at Disney's Animal Kingdom.

Heavy or light traffic within the ride system can cause speed variations as the vehicles try not to enter the specified safety distance between one another. On busy days, each vehicle may slow to a crawl at intervals within the ride path in order to allow the vehicle ahead to gain distance, then suddenly jerk back into higher speed. Because of these unexpected variations in speed, the soundtrack to the ride is not of a specific length, in fact, each scene of the attraction has a pre-selected score to play which is already of a certain length. If the vehicle finds itself remaining in one scene for an extended period of time, the score will play in full or until the vehicle leaves the scene. If the vehicle remains in a scene longer than the length of the score, then an exaggerated soundtrack of the vehicle's engine will fade-in and play to keep riders from experiencing awkward silence. Due to safety reasons, vehicles on the ride path cannot reverse. Contrary to the finale scene when the vehicle reverses away from the boulder, the vehicle is actually stationary while the motion base tilts backwards and the cave walls accelerate past the riders to give the illusion of reversing.

=== Audio-Animatronics ===
The attraction features four Audio-Animatronics, three of which are animatronics of Indiana Jones, and one of a giant cobra. Prior to the 2010 refurbishment, the Indiana Jones figure in front of the Gates of Doom had his back pushed against the gates. During the refurbishment, he was replaced with a more advanced figure that now is leaning his full body weight into the right door.

== Disneyland version ==
=== Story ===
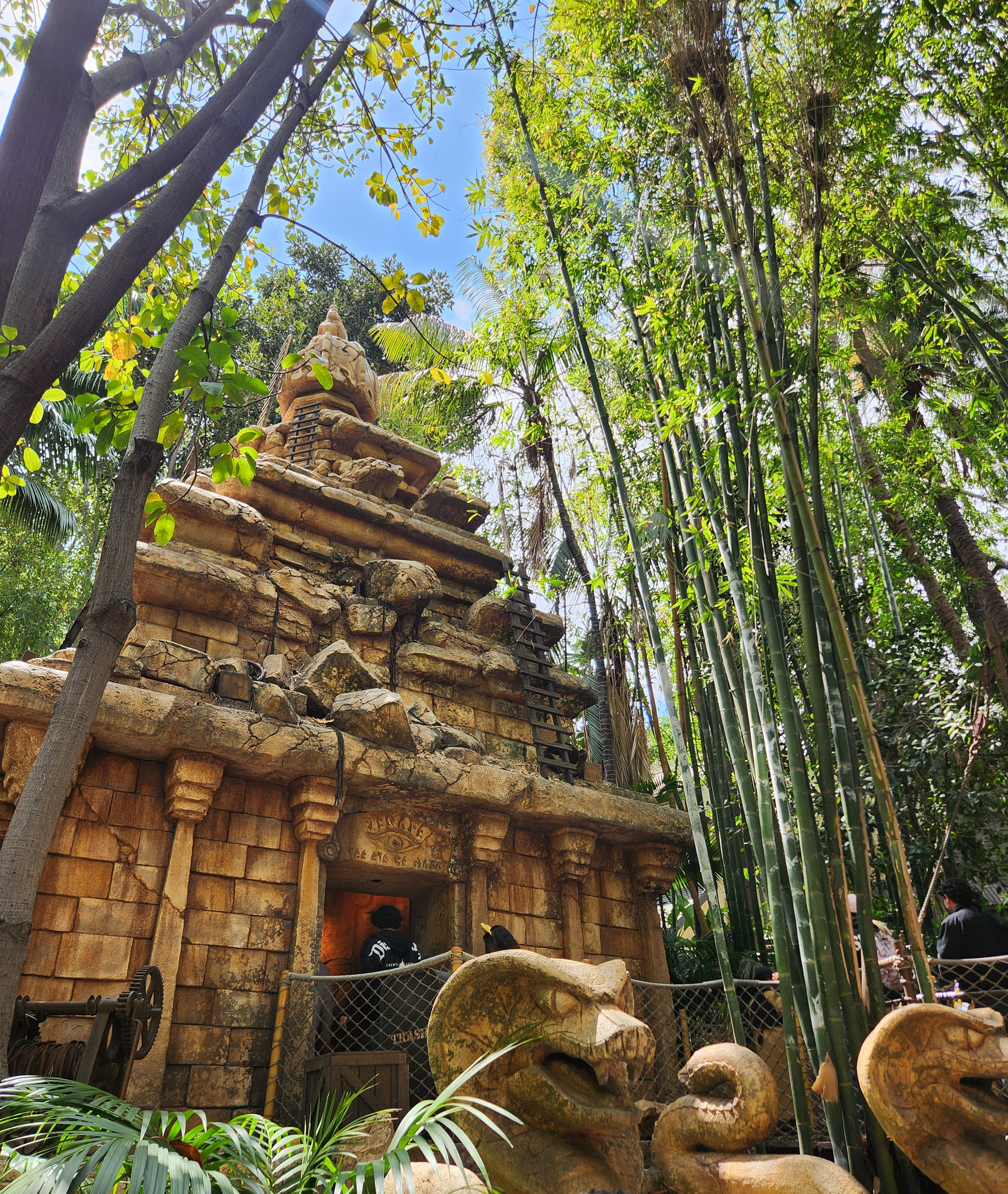
Temple of the Forbidden Eye at Disneyland

Indiana Jones Adventure: Temple of the Forbidden Eye is told through twelve letters and telegrams scattered throughout the queue as well as three newsreels shown before guests board the attraction.

In 1935 India, Indiana Jones reunites missing fragments of a map documenting the precise location of an ancient temple believed to have been buried in a flood over two thousand years ago. According to legend, the temple was built to honor the deity Mara, who offers one of three gifts to all who come to the hallowed site (eternal youth, earthly riches, or visions of the future) on the condition that they never gaze into the eyes of Mara.

Although the discovery, dubbed the "Temple of the Forbidden Eye" by the media, sets the archaeological community abuzz, Sallah begins conducting guided tours. Good fortune comes to many tourists, while others do not return at all. Jones eventually ventures inside to find the missing tourists.

=== Queue ===
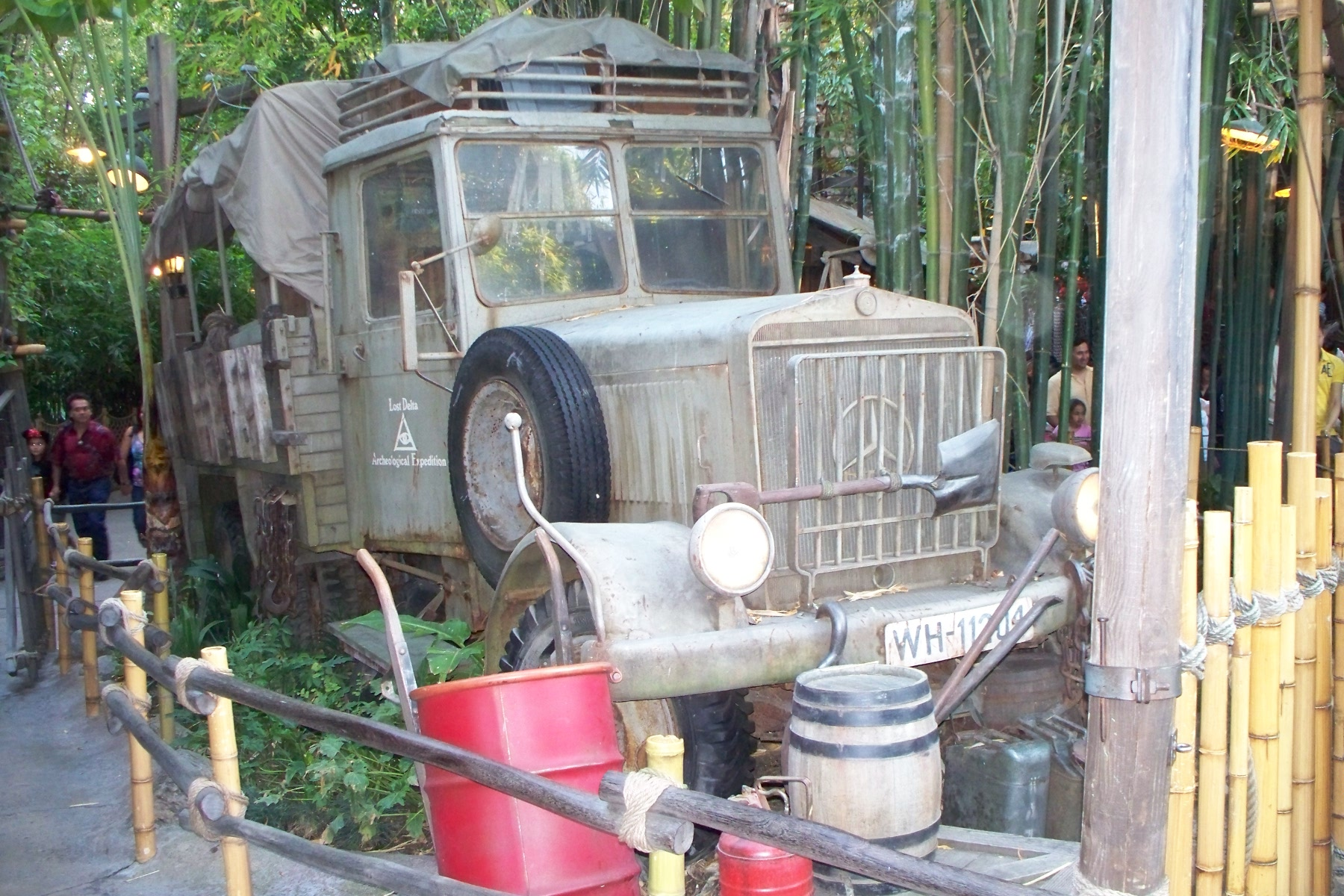
This 2.5 ton Mercedes-Benz diesel truck was actually used in the filming of the desert chase scene of Raiders of the Lost Ark and is on display near the exit queue of the Disneyland attraction. The pole with the golf ball mounted to the bumper was placed there as an aid to stuntmen during filming.

The attraction's detailed queue leads guests through dimly lit temple chambers and passageways containing booby-trapped sections reminiscent of the Indiana Jones movies.

The queue begins outside, winding past a 2.5 short ton (2.3 t) Mercedes-Benz troop transport truck. This is the actual vehicle used in the desert chase scene in Raiders of the Lost Ark. A small mining car near the truck is a movie prop as well, used in the mine scene in Indiana Jones and the Temple of Doom. Guests also walk by a noisy "hit-and-miss" engine/generator set piece, which appears to power the lights strung deep into the temple.

Much of the queue is inside the temple itself. Throughout the bowels of the temple, petroglyphs in "Marabic" warn temple visitors of the rewards and perils that can be found further within. The glyphs can be translated into English using a simple character substitution encoding. In the early months of the attraction's existence, guests were given decoder cards; the cards are now only distributed during special events or when made available. If unable to receive a decoder card, the code is easily solvable as each symbol bears a strong resemblance to its corresponding letter in the English alphabet. The sole exception is the letter I, which resembles an eye. Where the text is painted, vowels appear in red.

The queue contains several interactive features. In the "spike room", the ceiling appears to be retained by several upright bamboo poles. When the key supporting pole is pushed or pulled, guests are startled by sounds of the ceiling dropping as the spikes begin to descend slowly toward them. In the next area, large stone blocks released from the ceiling (triggered by the diamond-shaped stones below) are barely kept in place by wooden wedges and supports. Further on, in the Rotunda Calendar, pulling on a rope triggers responses from Dr. Dunfor Pullit, an out-of-sight archeologist supported by the rope beneath the sarcophagus stone. Various crates throughout the queue contain some significant features; one marked with the number "990 6753" refers to the number on the crate holding the Ark of the Covenant in Raiders of the Lost Ark. Another crate is marked "Deliver to Club Obi Wan", referring to a fictional club at the beginning of Indiana Jones and the Temple of Doom, itself a reference to the character Obi-Wan Kenobi from Star Wars. Eventually, guests encounter a projection of a newsreel of the discovery, followed by safety instructions delivered by Sallah. Mickey Mouse and Minnie Mouse appear on the cover of a copy of Life magazine in Professor Jones' office.

=== Ride experience ===
A diagram of the Chamber of Destiny

At the loading area, guests board the troop transport. Through the radio, Sallah (voiced by Bob Joles) reminds the tourists to fasten their seat belts and points out a problem with the brakes (in earlier versions of the ride, there would alternatively be problems with the gas pedal or the steering wheel). The transport takes off, past a cluster of mirrors concealing the maintenance dock entrance, and turns a corner into the Chamber of Destiny, where guests are presented with three doors. One of the three doors begins to glow more brightly than the other two, and Mara (voiced by James Earl Jones) announces which gift the passengers have chosen to receive. The doors open, and the passengers enter the Hall of Promise, where the idol of Mara resides at the end of the hall.

As originally built, the Chamber of Destiny only had one actual operating door and corridor. Since the ride's opening, the room's walls and ceiling were designed to rotate across the working doorway and a set of four façades (two on each side of the real doorway) so that three "doors" are always visible at any given time. Each of the doors are lit differently based on which particular chamber has been randomly chosen, and decoy tracks leading to the other doors have been used to enhance the effect. In 2013, new projection mapping effects were added for the Hall of Promise. The Chamber of Destiny's doors was also updated with projection mapping effects in 2015. As of 2026, the machinery used to rotate the room has been deactivated and is no longer used. Instead, the transport always enters the second door in the center, and the effect of entering a specific room is accomplished using projectors hidden on either side of the chamber, which shuffle through various video effects that are superimposed onto all three doors to create the illusion that the transport is entering a specific room.

- If the transport gets to the Chamber of Earthly Riches, Mara says, "You seek the Treasure of Mara? Glittering gold — it is yours." The vault, in the doors, begin to unlock as gold coins appear to rain down from above as they swing open. Inside the Hall of Promise, piles of gold, bronze statues, and priceless carvings fill vestibules on each side with a massive gold face of Mara at the far end of the hall. The room is illuminated with shimmering golden light behind the backlit scrims where images of gold and other treasures are visible, with sounds of coins echoing through the hall. Front-lit scrims along the walls are painted to depict true believers surrounded with hoards of treasures, symbolizing riches and wealth, beyond their wildest dreams.
- If the transport gets to the Fountain of Eternal Youth, Mara says, "You have chosen wisely. This path leads to timeless youth and beauty." The rusted, corroded doors of that chamber are rinsed clean by a sheet of purifying water pouring from the relief above, revealing their pristine, metallic nature as they swing open. Inside the Hall of Promise, where the painted murals on the walls show the timeless beauty of Mara's chosen ones as everyone around them ages, the walls reflect the light on the water. At the far end of the hall, a massive stone face of Mara, with flowering vines scaling the surrounding walls. The room appeared illuminated with shimmering aqua blue light with sounds of water drops echoing through the hall. Front-lit scrims along the walls are painted to depict true believers drinking mystic water, discarding their withered skin and emerging young and beautiful.
- If the transport gets to the Observatory of the Future, Mara says, "You seek the future. I will lift the curtain of time. It is your destiny." The doors are sealed by an iced web that clouds its carved reliefs. But upon Mara's announcement, the all-seeing eyes above glow, whisking away the icy wall as shooting stars illuminate the newly unlocked pathway as they swing open. Once inside, the Hall of Promise is lit by innumerable glowing stars, and the temple's open roof reveals the endless night sky above, with a glowing, ethereal face of Mara at the far end of the hall. The room is illuminated dimly lit purple, and the ceiling above twinkles with 5,000 fiber optic stars. The transport vehicle tilts upward, directing the passengers' eyes away from the dark scrims and towards the dazzling starfield.

As the guests approach the idol, Mara suddenly opens his eyes. Inevitably, as someone looks into them, the idol immediately scowls at the guests and, using projection mapping, shows the idol's face 'bleeding' with colors as he rescinds each of his gifts.

- For the Chamber of Earthly Riches, his gold metal face begins to corrode rapidly with acid, tarnishing and rusting it until his face turns into red copper.
- For the Fountain of Eternal Youth, his marble stone face begins to crack and "age" as the surrounding vines shrivel and their petals fall. Chillingly, Mara's eyes faded to a deep, endless black.
- For the Observatory of the Future, his ethereal face begins to be engulfed in a raging storm filled with lightning and, eventually, his face into a giant fireball.

During his rescinds, Mara cries out, "You looked into my eyes! Your path now leads to the Gates of Doom!" (For the Observatory of the Future scene, Mara's last line is changed to, "Your destiny now lies beyond the Gates of Doom!")

The transport momentarily appears to head toward an exit before making a sharp left turn into a large crumbling corridor. Using the hydraulic systems, the transport is given the effect of being lifted off the ground as it floats towards the Gates of Doom. Lightning flashes along the walls, illuminating large cobra statues overhead as the transport continues forward. The Gates of Doom pulsate with green mist, and an audio-animatronic Indiana Jones (voiced by Dave Temple) struggles to keep the doors closed. Jones pushes the doors shut, making the transport drop to the ground, and scolds the tourists for looking into the idol's eyes. He instructs them to proceed up the steps to the left. The transport then accelerates up the flight of stairs.

The transport emerges from the passage and teeters on the edge of a vast pit of lava. If timed correctly, another transport can be seen attempting to cross a rickety rope bridge that spans the pit under a crumbling ceiling. On the far side of the cavern, there is a 45-foot-tall (14 m) stone face of Mara that periodically shoots green rays at both transports, causing flames to erupt from where the beam hits the cavern. Formerly, there was an effect in place within this scene where the light beams would hit the ceiling, causing dyed ice cubes to rain down, simulating the rubble of the caving temple, but it was removed due to operational issues. However, the sound effect for the rubble can still be heard upon entering the room. The transport then turns left and enters catacombs of false pathways lined with skeletons, some of which pop out toward the guests.

Suddenly, the transport veers to the left, and all is dark. The transport's headlights flicker back on, illuminating walls swarming with thousands of beetles. Hissing sounds are heard, and riders are blasted with puffs of air. The transport heads out of the darkness and onto the bridge which spans the pit. The transport stalls for a moment as another oncoming transport can be seen about to cross the bridge (depending on the transport's timed arrival), which turns away just before reaching it. The transport then accelerates across the bridge, which sways and jostles under its weight. The massive stone face of Mara shoots beams from its eye, attempting to destroy the bridge. The transport makes it safely across, then turns sharply to the right.

Hundreds of snakes cover the walls and ground, and a large audio-animatronic cobra appears to the right of the vehicle, striking at the riders. The transport heads back to return across the rope bridge and flashes its headlights at an oncoming transport about to cross (again, depending on the transport's timed arrival). The transport turns sharply to the right, traveling behind the giant stone carving of Mara's face, and enter a room full of skulls (the number of skulls is 1,995, a reference to the year of the ride's opening), and Mara roars at the riders from above. The transport turns towards the left and dips underneath the main bridge as a fireball erupts ahead from the laser beam. The vehicle nearly gets hit by the deadly laser blast from the "Broken Nose Of Mara" as the transport travels across a mini wooden bridge and veers into a pitch-black tunnel. Shocks of electricity suddenly chase the transport before it stalls for a brief moment. All of a sudden, the transport starts up again and it heads towards an empty corridor leading towards a way out of the temple when, suddenly, the electrical shocks blasts the corridor, causing it to collapse and block the tunnel (formerly until 2023, this scene used to be the Rat Cave, in which the vehicle crashes into a log covered in thousands of rats, and rat sounds were heard when the vehicle stalls in the dark) and the transport careens through another dimly lit tunnel with paintings of spear-wielding skeletal warriors adorning the walls. Blasts of air hit the riders, and darts are heard striking the transport as it rolls over the trigger stones between the skeletal warriors.

The transport then approaches a dark area and stops. Indiana Jones suddenly appears above the vehicle hanging on a rope in a shaft of light. He welcomes the adventurers' rescue and bids for them to turn on the headlights and allow him to board. As the lights flicker on, they illuminate a massive boulder rolling toward the transport. The transport seems to back up as the boulder threatens to crush Jones and the tourists (this effect is achieved by moving the walls of the room forward, not moving the transport backward). At the last possible second, the transport accelerates, and suddenly the floor seems to give way, sending the transport into the chamber below. An impact resonates through the chamber as if the boulder has crashed down, nearly striking the transport.

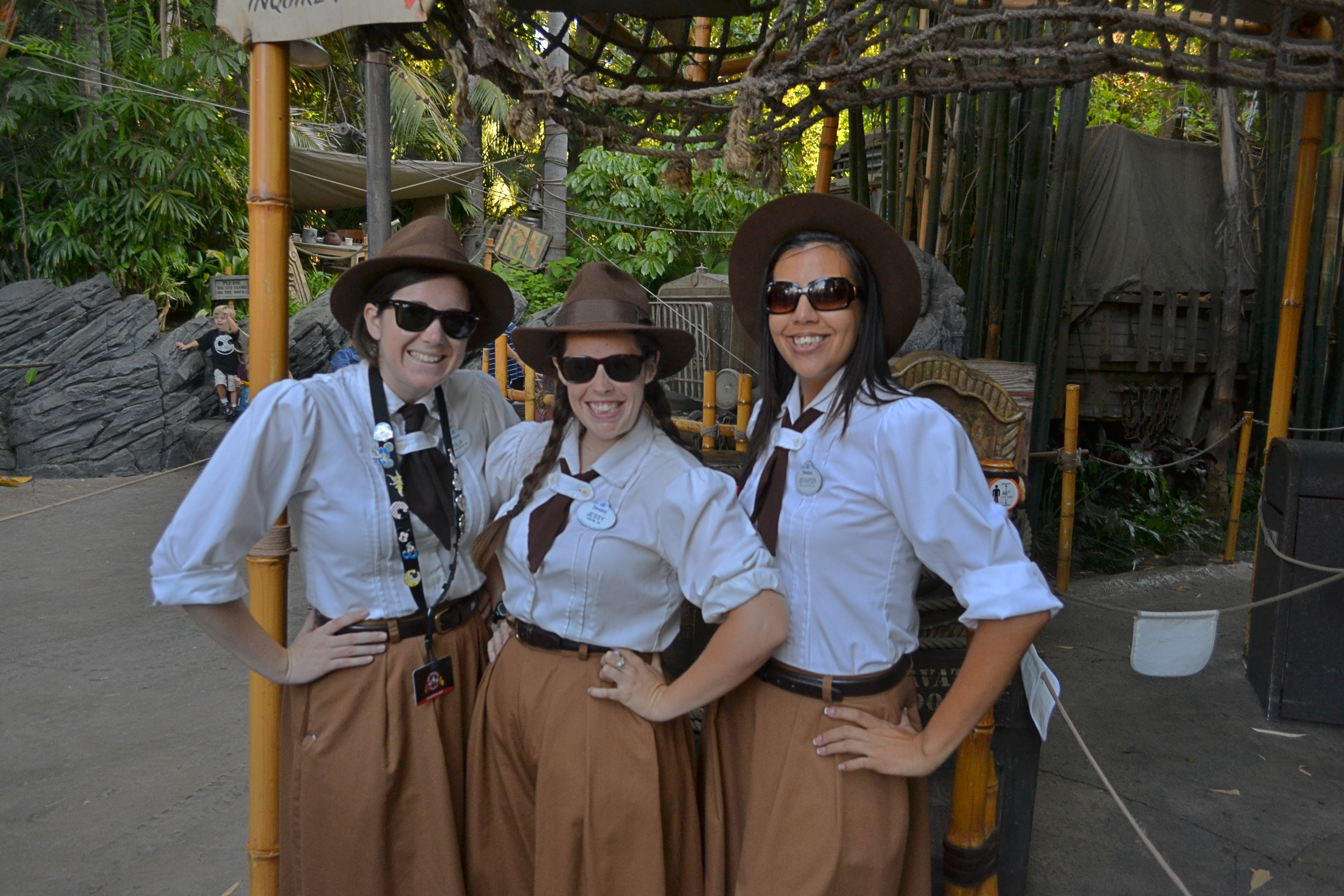
Cast members in costume

The transport plunges down into darkness and swerves right to see Jones standing in front of the boulder, which has been cracked by its impact. An exhausted Jones wipes his forehead and says one of the following:

- "Not bad, for tourists.. Now, stay out of trouble will ya?"
- "There! That wasn't so bad, was it?"
- "Next time, you're on your own!"
- "Now, next time, you wear blindfolds, okay?"
- "Now, don't tell me that wasn't big fun!"
- "Tourists... Why'd it have to be tourists?"
- "You were good in there. You were very, very good."

A final triumphant refrain of music ushers the guests back into the station. Sallah welcomes back the tourists and tells them to remain seated as the transport reaches the loading area.

== Tokyo DisneySea version ==
=== Story ===
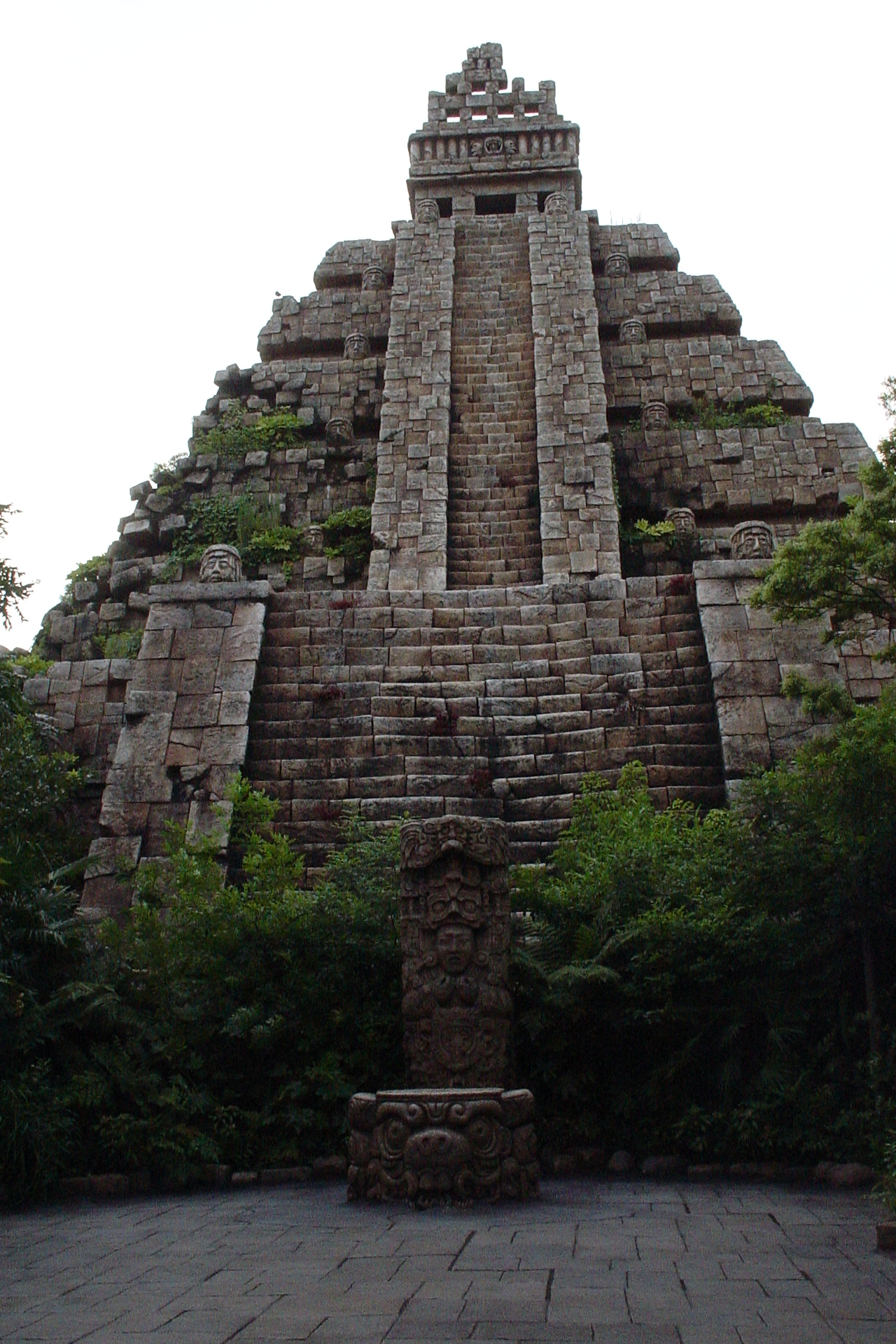
Aztec pyramid at Tokyo DisneySea

Set in an unspecified region of Mexico during the 1930s, Indiana Jones Adventure: Temple of the Crystal Skull takes place in the Temple of the Crystal Skull, a Maya temple guarded by a Crystal Skull. Hosted by a character named Paco (portrayed by Katsuhisa Hōki), the story features Indiana Jones (voiced by Kunio Murai) searching for the Fountain of Youth. While the name is similar to that of the fourth Indiana Jones film, the design of the titular skull is entirely different, and the scenarios in the attraction are unrelated to the film.

=== Queue ===
The Temple of the Crystal Skull building exterior resembles a large Maya pyramid and temple, set in the Latin American port "Lost River Delta" at Tokyo DisneySea. The design is influenced by ancient Maya architecture and art. There is a large room in the first pyramid with elaborate, Mayan-inspired frescoes on the walls; skeletons litter the floor around the queue walkway. The queue subsequently passes through a series of smaller, intricately themed chambers. Paco, a Mexican tour guide, hosts a black-and-white safety film, which plays on a continuous loop.

=== Ride experience ===
Everyone is seeking the Fountain of Youth. There is a single carved door with pools of water to the side, complemented by mist and what appears to be endless hallways.

All guests enter the same hallway, seeking the Fountain of Youth. This single hallway contains effects from all three variations seen in “Forbidden Eye”: fiber optic stars, statues holding glowing treasure, and water effects. At the end of the hall awaits the Crystal Skull. It glows demonically, signaling that the journey is about to take a turn toward the Gates of Doom.

The transport momentarily appears to head toward an exit, before making a sharp turn into a large corridor. Lightning flashes along the walls, illuminating large cobra statues overhead as the transport seems to "float" through the room using the EMV technology.

The Gates of Doom pulsate with green mist as Indiana Jones struggles to keep the doors closed. Jones, speaking in Japanese, scolds the tourists for waking the Crystal Skull and instructs them to proceed up the steps to the left. The triumphant musical theme from Raiders of the Lost Ark is heard as the transport accelerates up the flight of stairs, entering a room with a rope bridge and a large stone face resembling the Crystal Skull.

Blues and greens are the colors that fill this room. There is a large tornado effect near the bridge. The eye of the large skull is crystal and emits lasers and other lighting effects.

The transport turns left and enters another chamber filled with skeletons, some of which pop out toward the guests.

Suddenly, all is dark; the music tinkles with chaotic violin pizzicatos. The transport's headlights flicker on, illuminating walls swarming with thousands of beetles. Hissing sounds are heard, and riders are blasted with puffs of air.

The transport finally heads out of the darkness and onto the bridge which spans the pit. The transport stalls for a moment as another oncoming transport can be seen across the pit (if the transport's arrival is timed correctly), but it turns out of the way before reaching the bridge. The transport then accelerates across the bridge which sways and jostles under its weight. The massive stone skull shoots beams from its eye at the bridge, attempting to destroy it. The transport safely makes it across and makes a right turn.

Thousands of snakes line the walls and ground and a gigantic audio-animatronic version of the Mesoamerican deity Quetzalcoatl, with glowing red eyes, appears to the right of the vehicle, striking at the riders.

The transport heads back to return across the rope bridge and flashes its headlights at an oncoming transport about to cross (again, if the transport's arrival is timed correctly). The transport turns sharply to the right, entering behind the giant stone skull. The transport slides past hundreds of human skulls which decorate the walls, as the crystal skull on a plinth radiates light. Turning left, out of the massive stone skull, the transport continues downward, passing under the rope bridge.

Encountering a carved skull-like face in the wall in front of the vehicle, the transport pauses for a moment as a fireball (a large ring of harmless orange colored smoke) suddenly emerges from the face's mouth, heading straight towards the transport. The transport swerves to the right driving through the smoke and onto the next corridor.

A hall lined with sculptures of gaping skulls along the walls. The vehicle lurches forward over the pressure plates in the floor activating the booby trap. From the mouth of each skull shoots a dart (air jets that emit sudden swift puffs of air). The transport rolls to the end and makes a sharp right into the Boulder Room.

Jones hangs from a vine above. As the transport pulls up underneath him he shouts (In Japanese) one of several phrases cautioning the riders. As the boulder rolls towards the transport and falls, the transport plunges and a photograph of the entire car of riders is taken. The photograph may be purchased after the ride.

The transport drops suddenly, then turns right sharply in a dark tunnel and comes out to see Jones standing in front of the crushed boulder. Jones wipes his forehead and says one of several pre-recorded phrases. A final triumphant refrain of the music ushers the guests back into the station. While waiting to disembark, the mobile radio transceiver announces one of several "please remain seated" messages.

== Disney’s Animal Kingdom ==
An Indiana Jones attraction is scheduled to open in 2027 at Disney's Animal Kingdom, replacing Dinosaur.

== Music ==
In addition to dialogue and sound effects, an orchestral soundtrack plays through the speakers built into the troop transports. This medley contains segments and motifs of John Williams' original scores for the first three Indiana Jones movies, re-scored and re-recorded to sync up with the perils of the adventure. Richard Bellis was responsible for this adaptation process. "The Raiders' March" and Ark theme both feature prominently at various points.

The following list is a breakdown of the different passages heard in the attraction, and the track times at which the original versions can be found on the soundtracks for the films.

- Chamber of Destiny: "The Miracle of the Ark" (Raiders of the Lost Ark)
- Hall of Promise: "The Map Room: Dawn" (Raiders of the Lost Ark)
- Tunnel of Torment: "The Miracle of the Ark" (Raiders of the Lost Ark)
- Gates of Doom: "The Desert Chase" (Raiders of the Lost Ark)
- Main Show Building: "The Miracle of the Ark" (Raiders of the Lost Ark)
- Mummy Chamber: "Nocturnal Activities" (Indiana Jones and the Temple of Doom)
- Bug Room: "In the Idol's Temple", "The Well of Souls" (Raiders of the Lost Ark)
- The Bridge: "The Miracle of the Ark" (Raiders of the Lost Ark)
- Snake Temple: "Slalom on Mt. Humol" (Indiana Jones and the Temple of Doom)
- Mudslide: "Belly of the Steel Beast" (Indiana Jones and the Last Crusade)
- Skull Room: "Slalom on Mt. Humol", "The Mine Car Chase" (Indiana Jones and the Temple of Doom)
- Face Room/Rat Cave: "Bug Tunnel and Death Trap", "Slalom on Mt. Humol" (Indiana Jones and the Temple of Doom)
- Dart Corridor: "Bug Tunnel and Death Trap" (Indiana Jones and the Temple of Doom)
- Rolling Boulder: "The Basket Game" (Raiders of the Lost Ark), "Fast Streets of Shanghai" (Indiana Jones and the Temple of Doom)
- Finale: "Flight from Peru", "The Raiders' March", 2:21 (Raiders of the Lost Ark)

A variety of big band pieces and swing tunes from the 1930s can be heard from a radio in the outdoor queue, including "In the Mood" by Glenn Miller.

== See also ==
- Indiana Jones and the Temple of Peril, a mine car-themed roller coaster in Disneyland Paris
- Indiana Jones Epic Stunt Spectacular!, a live stunt show in Disney's Hollywood Studios
- Dinosaur, a similar dark ride attraction in Disney's Animal Kingdom
- Indiana Jones Summer of Hidden Mysteries, a promotional tie-in small stage show in Disneyland
- List of amusement rides based on film franchises
