= Dinosaur (Disney's Animal Kingdom) =

Defunct ride at Disney's Animal Kingdom

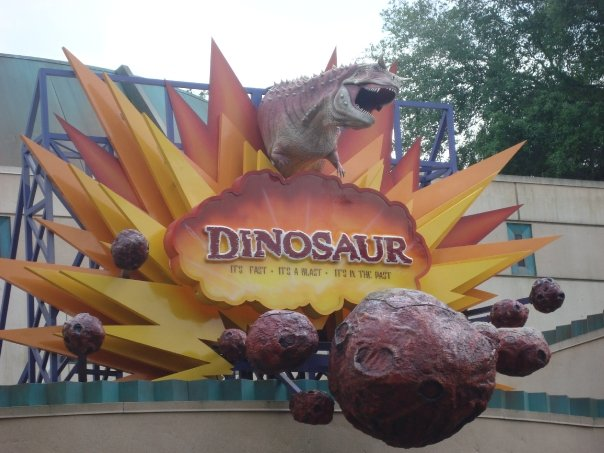
- Attraction's marquee at the entrance

Disney's Animal Kingdom
- Area: DinoLand U.S.A.
- Coordinates: 28°21′18.71″N 81°35′17.96″W
- Status: Closed
- Opening date: April 22, 1998
- Closing date: February 2, 2026
- Replaced by: Indiana Jones and the Myth of the Jade Serpent (Tropical Americas)

Ride statistics
- Attraction type: EMV dark ride
- Manufacturer: MTS Systems Corporation
- Designer: Walt Disney Imagineering
- Theme: Dinosaur
- Music: Richard Bellis
- Length: 1,856 ft (566 m)
- Speed: 12 mph (19 km/h)
- Vehicle type: Enhanced motion vehicle
- Vehicles: 15 Time Rovers (Note: A total of up to 15 vehicles were able to operate during regular park operations.)
- Riders per vehicle: 12
- Rows: 3
- Riders per row: 4
- Duration: 3:10
- Height restriction: 40 in (102 cm)
- Audio-Animatronics: 11 (Note: A twelfth animatronic existed in the attraction, an additional Carnotaurus, as an alternate in the on-ride photo scene if the main animatronic was not functional.)
- Sponsor: McDonald's (1998–2008)
- Queue host: Bill Nye (voice)
- Pre-show hosts: Dr. Helen Marsh (Phylicia Rashad); Dr. Grant Seeker (Wallace Langham)
- Ride host: Dr. Grant Seeker (voice)
- Previously known as: Countdown to Extinction (1998–2000)
- Lightning Lane formerly available
- Must transfer from wheelchair
- Assistive listening available
- Closed captioning available

Dinosaur (stylized in all caps as DINOSAUR) was a dark ride EMV attraction at Disney's Animal Kingdom at the Walt Disney World Resort in Bay Lake, Florida. The ride featured a turbulent journey through the late Cretaceous period, featuring prehistoric scenes populated with dinosaur audio-animatronics. Originally named Countdown to Extinction when the park opened on April 22, 1998, the ride was re-named to Dinosaur in 2000 to promote Disney Animation's feature film of the same name. In the attraction, the two prominently featured dinosaurs were the Iguanodon and Carnotaurus, which were also featured in the film. Scenes from the movie also appeared in the pre-show.

In August 2024, it was announced at the D23 fan event that the area that Dinosaur and the land the attraction was located in, DinoLand U.S.A., will be replaced with a new land called Tropical Americas, which is scheduled to open in 2027, with an Indiana Jones attraction replacing Dinosaur. Dinosaur closed on February 2, 2026. In August 2026, the name of the Indiana Jones attraction was revealed to be Indiana Jones and the Myth of the Jade Serpent.

== Ride experience ==
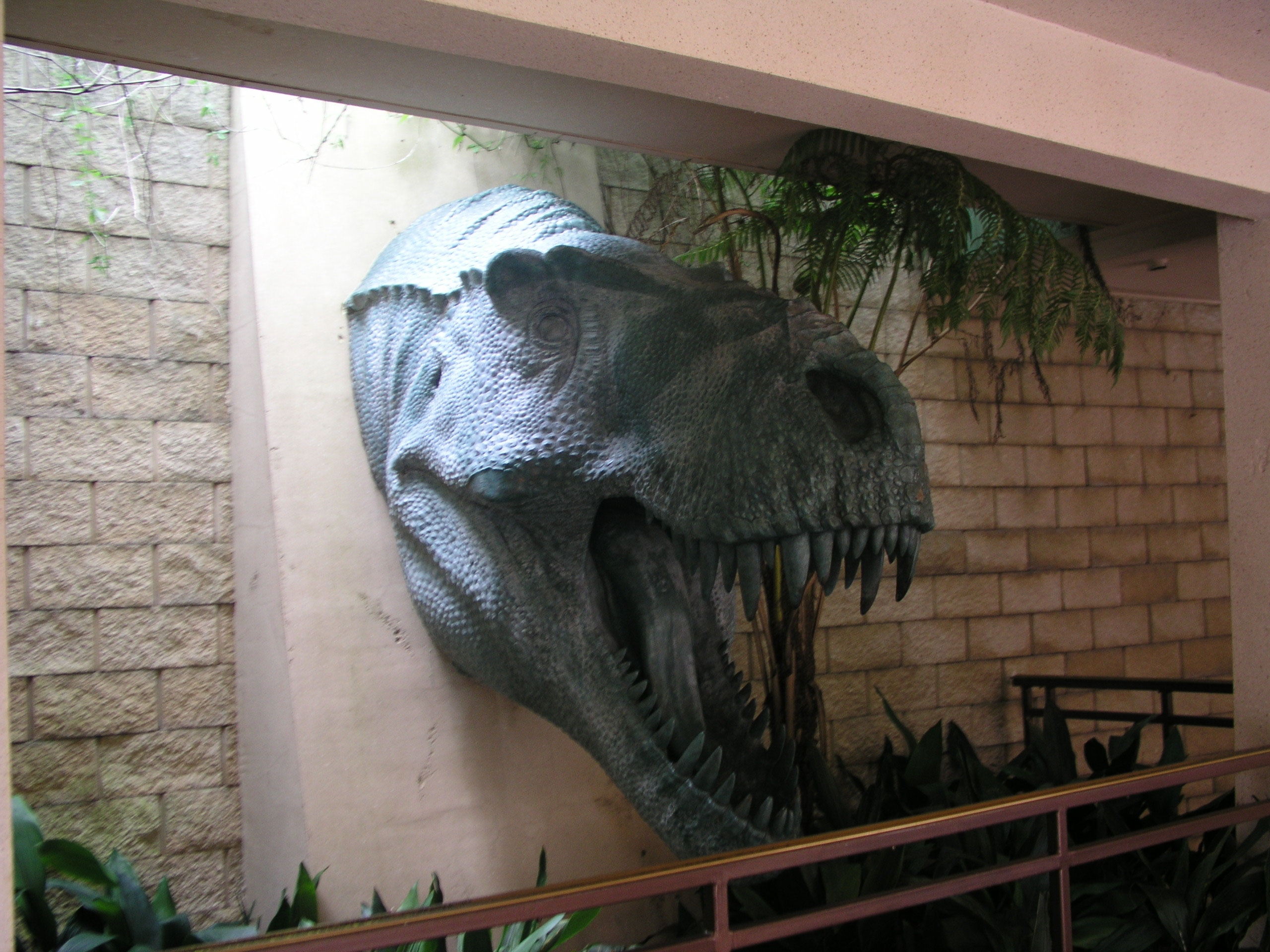
The Tyrannosaurus rex head in the extended queue area.

=== Queue ===
If the ride was busy, then guests would first wind though an outdoor area before entering the first section of the indoor queue. Once inside the first section, guests would see several small exhibits including a display of small fossils (including Champsosaurus, Dromaeosaurus, Protostega, among others.), modern animals that can be traced back to the dinosaur ages, and evidence for the several theories of mass extinction.

The second section of the indoor queue was an eight-sided room, with the upper parts of the walls displaying some artist renderings of what the age of the dinosaurs might have looked like and some fossils. The lower sections of the walls were a simulation of sedimentary rock that contained fossils. Some sections of the lower walls had windows that displayed some more fossils. Hanging from the ceiling was a large globe with Pangaea, and a rod connected to the globe with measurements of hundreds of thousands of miles to show how far the theoretical asteroid that impacted with earth to cause mass extinction had to travel. The defining feature of the second room was its centerpiece: a Carnotaurus skeleton (actually a Tyrannosaurus with a Carnotaurus skull). In the second room, at regular time intervals, the lights dimmed, and Bill Nye the Science Guy shared some facts and theories about the age of dinosaurs, using the globe, the paintings, and the fossil to help out with his small lectures. After weaving through the second room, guests then entered one of two pre-show theaters.

=== Preshow ===
Guests entered a small standup theater and a short movie came on a projection screen. The first part of the movie was a small presentation by the fictional director of the Dino Institute, Dr. Helen Marsh (played by Phylicia Rashad). She claims that the "bare bones" approach of displaying research of prehistory is "about to become extinct." She says that the Dino Institute has created a "time rover" that has the ability to take guests to the age of the dinosaurs. She says that the rover is intended to take guests to a "breathtaking world where you will witness the most fantastic creatures to ever walk the earth." Dr. Marsh then transfers to a "live" feed of the control center for a comprehensive safety briefing. Riders were greeted in the second section of the movie by the controller Dr. Grant Seeker (played by actor Wallace Langham). Seeker decides to skip most of the safety notes and get to talking about what his intentions are. He intends to use the time rover and the guests that were supposed to take a tour to go on a mission to save an Iguanodon from extinction and bring it back to the Dino Institute. He says that he tagged him with a locator during a previous "unauthorized" field trip. He then goes on to say that the Iguanodon is at the very end of the Cretaceous period. However, Dr. Marsh comes into the control center and says that the tours are intended for the Early Cretaceous, and that the rovers are locked on those coordinates. Dr. Seeker then continues his "safety briefing" by talking about flash photos and seatbelts. Dr. Marsh leaves the room during that small section of the video, and Dr. Seeker unlocks the time coordinates behind her back. Automatic doors on the opposite side of the theatre opened up to the entrance of the loading area. As guests exited, the voice of Dr. Seeker was heard, reminding guests and to not tell anyone else.

=== Ride experience ===
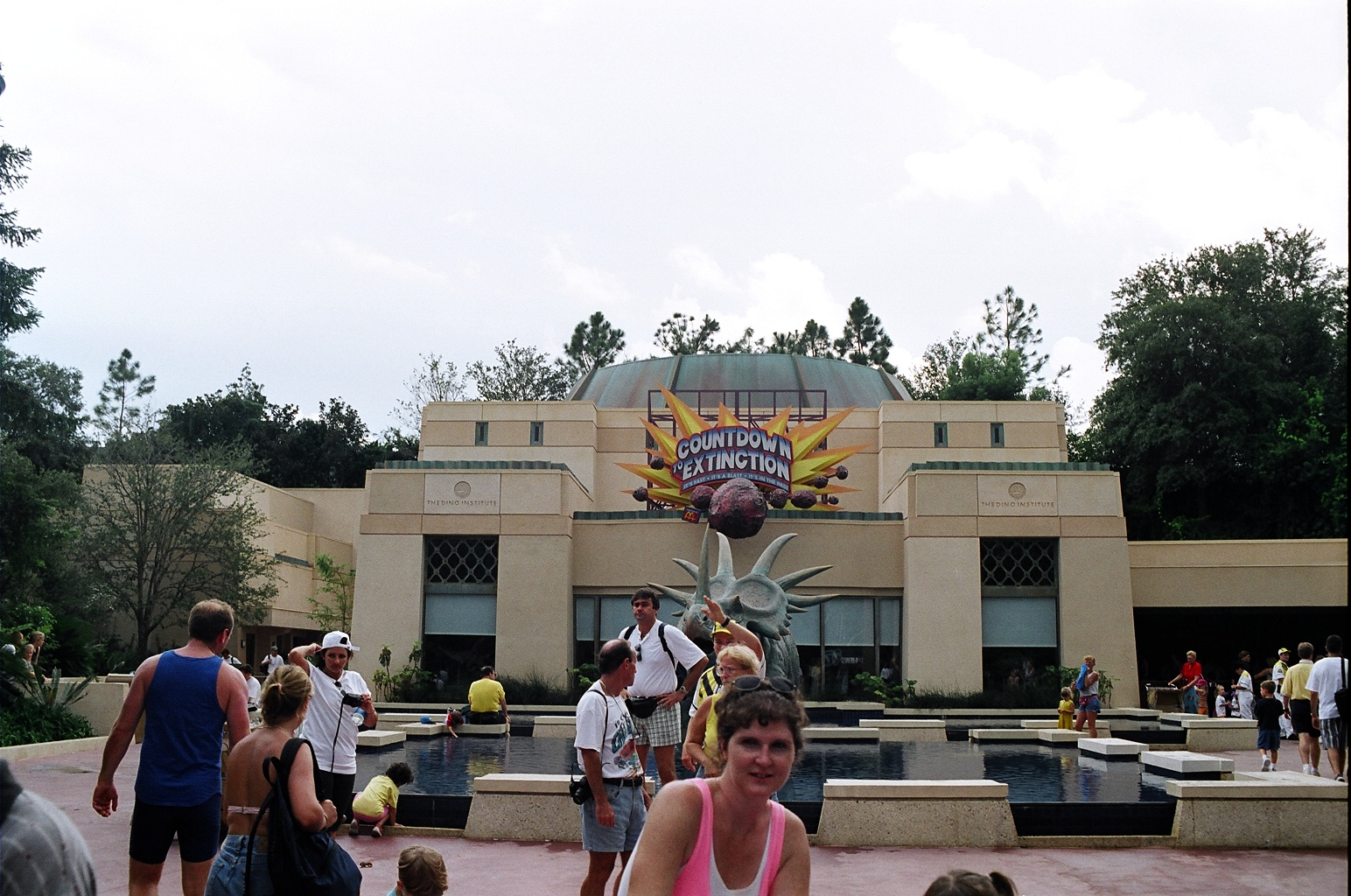
The ride while it was known as Countdown to Extinction.

Guests entered an underground research facility where the time rover would pick them up. Once the riders got onboard, they pulled forward for a seatbelt check. They then proceeded to a security checkpoint. Suddenly, alarms and warning lights went off, indicating that Dr. Seeker's modified coordinates had been detected, and the vehicle is unauthorized to continue. Lurching forward, Seeker ignored the alarms and moved the vehicle into the "Time Tunnel", where flashing lights temporarily blinded the riders. When their vision returns, they were transported to prehistoric times.

When they landed, guests could smell the forest and trees around them while they came across a Styracosaurus, an Alioramus eating a Brachychampsa, a Parasaurolophus (identified as "hadrosaur") watching over its young, and a Velociraptor (identified as "raptor"). Seeker, their driver, then locked onto the signal of the tracker and the ride became much bumpier. The scanner built into the rover picked up a big dinosaur, and Seeker thought that it was the Iguanodon. He pulled the rover to a full stop, but found out that the dinosaur was a Carnotaurus. The rover took off away from the Carnotaurus, and found another big dinosaur with the scanner. The dinosaur was a Saltasaurus (identified as "sauropod"). The rover started to pull away again. The timer that counts down to the asteroid that causes the mass extinction claimed that the asteroid is going to strike in 90 seconds, and the rover started to pick up the pace. The scanner found an Cearadactylus (identified as "pterodactyl") that was flying directly towards them. The rover drove down a small hill and dodged the pterosaur.

Now in almost complete darkness, the rover sped through the forest and picked up a pack of Compsognathus on the scanner that were running through the forest with them. The rover fell down another small hill and lost traction. The Carnotaurus the riders saw before appeared in front of them, and walked towards the Time Rover. Seeker turned on the four-wheel drive system and successfully got the rover away just before the Carnotaurus got to the riders. The rover performed evasive maneuvers to dodge the meteors in the darkness. After dodging the meteors successfully, the rover then stumbled upon the Carnotaurus once again, which tried to lunge at them. This is where the ride took the rider's photo. The rover took off again into a small section of the forest where some of the trees were falling down. The scanner finds the Iguanodon, but Seeker decides to abort the mission and bring the rover back, as the asteroid is about to strike. A tree was about to fall on the rover, but the Iguanodon caught the tree and the rover proceeded as a net from the rover caught the Iguanodon (through a projection cast on the animatronic). The asteroid struck the ground and created a flash of light, and the Carnotaurus was seen giving one last lunge. However, at the last second, the rover transported back to the institute, where Dr. Seeker congratulated guests on making it back.

The rover then proceeded to the loading station while videos on TV monitors showed the Iguanodon roaming around the institute. On the right, guests could view a large mirror, which was added for a Pepper's ghost effect showing that the Iguanodon traveled with them. However, this effect was never implemented. The riders then got off and proceeded to some stairs, which lead to the gift shop. As guests left, they could see Dr. Marsh and the Dino Institute employees attempting to chase down the Iguanodon and Dr. Seeker on overhead TV monitors. Guests could also hear radio chatter indicating what was going on.

== Incidents ==
- On April 30, 2005, a 30-year-old man from Mooresville, Indiana, lost consciousness shortly after exiting the ride and died from a heart attack moments later. An investigation showed the ride was operating correctly and was not the cause of his death; he had a pacemaker.
- On May 29, 2013, a woman found a loaded pistol in a ride vehicle. The gun was reported to the ride attendant, who in turn reported the incident to authorities. The owner of the gun stated that he was unaware of Disney's policy against weapons and had a concealed weapons permit.

== See also ==
- Indiana Jones Adventure, similar dark ride attraction
- Jurassic Park: The Ride, a similarly themed attraction at Universal parks.
