= Enhanced motion vehicle =

Theme park ride vehicle

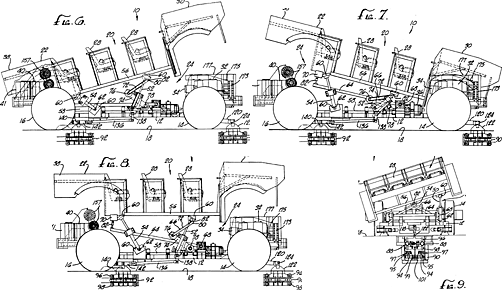
Diagrams showing the range of motion of an enhanced motion vehicle

An enhanced motion vehicle, or EMV, is a ride vehicle developed by Walt Disney Imagineering, a component of The Walt Disney Company, for use in amusement park rides located at Disney's theme parks. Riders are seated on a modified motion simulator base that is mounted on a wheeled chassis. As the vehicle travels through the attraction, the motion base simulates movement, such as driving over rough terrain or leaning through a turn, that makes the ride experience appear more realistic.

== Design history ==
Disney filed for patent on the Enhanced Motion Vehicle ride system on November 16, 1995.

This ride system was developed in collaboration with MTS Systems Corporation for the Indiana Jones Adventure. Four such systems were built (in chronological order):

- Development prototype/test track, built inside a Burbank warehouse, near Walt Disney Imagineering (now dismantled).
- Indiana Jones Adventure: Temple of the Forbidden Eye at Disneyland in Anaheim, California.
- Dinosaur, a bolt-for-bolt identical ride system which opened as CTX: Countdown to Extinction, located at Disney's Animal Kingdom in Orlando, Florida.
- Indiana Jones Adventure: Temple of the Crystal Skull at Tokyo DisneySea.

The Enhanced Motion Vehicles (EMV) are intended to appear as a battered military troop transport or "Time Rover". EMVs are driven less than 14 miles per hour (23 km/h) by air filled tractor trailer tires atop the surface of a slotted roadbed. Beneath the slot, a tubular guiderail guides the front wheelset and is responsible for supplying power to the vehicle, which is 480 volts in three phase, with a capacity of 200 Amps. The power is divided among the communications, control, safety, audio systems and the two motion systems - propulsion and hydraulics. Each transport can accommodate twelve guests with three rows of seats, four across, with the front left seat behind non-operational steering wheel. In addition to the three bus bars for power, there are three additional bus bars, one for a "GO" signal, one for a "NOGO" signal, and one for ground.

Each EMV is a motion simulator, or technically a 'full-motion chassis' because it is not under the control of the occupants, and it travels through a show building instead of enclosing occupants in a moving theater room, as in the case of Star Tours. The EMV motion base is attached by three hydraulic actuators to the frame of the chassis carrying the bulk of unsprung weight, allowing the low-mass body shell to articulate independently and rapidly with micrometer precision by incorporating a position feedback system. Three actuators are used on the chassis motion platform to position the motion base in three degrees of freedom: one thrust plane (z) with two rotational axes (pitch and roll). A guest's physically intense experience is programmed to achieve the illusion of greater speed and catastrophic mechanical failure using the enhanced-motion vehicle's ability to add several feet of lift then rapidly descend, shudder and tremble, and intensify cornering with counter-bank and twist.

A variance on the Japanese version replaces the three hydraulic rams with linear-inductive actuators. The 35 gallons of hydraulic fluid used on the Disneyland version takes two hours to clean off the track when a hose splits. Because of Japan's environmental codes regarding oil spills, the Japanese design team elected to substitute electromagnetic actuators on the ride vehicle.

== Systems operation ==
=== Communications ===
Each car must know where it is in relationship with other cars; it does this by transmitting its position to the control tower and receiving the positions of other cars over a spread spectrum radio to avoid the noise of power pickup wipers arcing along the bus bar. The vehicle also responds to programming selections indicated by a section of track and reports which subprogram it is currently running.

=== Control ===
Feedback provides the position in space the car body occupies and what amount of actuator change needs to be applied to reach the next position and at what rate. Control also triggers various audio, receives location information from communications and adjusts power with Silicon Control Relays and Silicon Control Rectifiers to operate motors and switches, the most important switch being "STOP".

=== Safety ===
STOP is the most important element of the safety system. There are more ways to stop than to go. Ways to stop are parallel. Ways to go are sequential. The hard reset is the most basic stop; it involves cycling the power off, then on. There are large red mushroom buttons at each loading station and in the tower within easy reach of each operator that will halt all vehicle motion. There are many different kinds of "stop" functions, some unique to specific ride operation consoles. All ride operation consoles have "station stop" mushroom buttons. "Station stop" halts all vehicle motion in the station. Because the two sides of the station (north and south) can be operated independently, station stops located in the loading area cannot stop motion on both sides of the station simultaneously (e.g. a station stop pressed at the south load console will not stop vehicle motion on the north side). Block violations are among several internal automatic stop responses, where two cars are within the same track zone. A seatbelt could come free triggering a stop, or an obstacle sensed on the track such as a purse. Mushroom buttons were fitted to each rear bumper after continued operation. Other logistical controls will also halt motion, such as switching a vehicle in or out of the track loop. In order for vehicles to move throughout the attraction, Ride Access Control (RAC) "lockout keys" must all be in place, indicating that no personnel occupy the track. Before a vehicle can be dispatched into the attraction, operation personnel verify all seatbelts are locked and loose articles are secured. Operation personnel must check that each safety belt is secure two ways - positive action visual inspection, where the rider pulls at a yellow strap attached to the buckle end, and an automatic LED panel on each side of the vehicle which lights up a grid point when a buckle is locked. Only then are operators allowed to press a green dispatch button located deep within a protective sleeve.

=== Audio systems ===
Sections of track trigger various audio sequences stored onboard 16-gig EEPROM storage, which also stores motion sequence programming.

=== Motion systems ===
==== Propulsion ====
Propulsion is generated through the hydraulic system. Refer to the hydraulic system overview below.

==== Hydraulics ====
Every vehicle is equipped with a complete hydraulic system to power its various components. These components include three hydraulic actuators which are connected to the motion base (body) of the vehicle. Specifically, there are 2 actuators towards the front right and front left of the motion base, and 1 actuator in the rear-center of the motion base. These actuators can produce 3 individual degrees of motion; pitch and roll. Of course, a combination of these motions can be used.

Two other actuators are utilized to control the steering of the rear-left and rear-right wheels. The front wheels are steered mechanically through the front bogie, but an encoder is used on the front steering system to tell the ride control computer how much to turn the rear wheels to assist the overall steering of the vehicle. Simply put, the rear wheels change their positions based upon the input from the front wheels.

One last actuator is used for the rear bogie. This is known as the rear follower lockout actuator. This actuator can run in 2 modes; an extended mode and a retracted mode. Each mode allows the rear offset of the vehicle to be confined within a fixed distance of travel. In the retracted mode, the vehicle can make sharp turns, to the point of the rear wheels actually crossing the track slot (though this does not happen under normal operation). The extended mode does not allow such a large rear offset, and is thus used when the vehicle may have little clearance on the side. If the vehicle attempts to travel outside of the confined distances of travel, the vehicle will initiate an automatic power disconnect, halting vehicle movement immediately.

Another component of the hydraulic system is the propulsion motor. The hydraulic propulsion motor is responsible for providing forward movement of the vehicles. The propulsion motor is of the axial piston pump type, and is capable of variable speed. In addition to providing forward power, it is also used as a main braking device for the vehicles. When traveling down a hill, the vehicles will drive the position of the swash plate within the propulsion motor to a negative angle, utilizing the propulsion motor as a pump. This allows the vehicle to convert its kinetic energy into hydraulic pressure, which is stored in its high pressure accumulators. The majority of deceleration breaking within the attraction uses this method of slowing the vehicle down.

The hydraulic system also comprises a hydraulic pump, which is driven by a 50-horsepower, 480 volt, 3-phase electric motor. The electric motor is constantly running, and is cooled by a large fan. The pump, however, is only engaged when hydraulic pressure needs to be generated. For instance, when a vehicle is stopped and the motion base is not moving, the pump will only engage one or two times per minute. However, when the vehicle is traveling through the attraction, the pump is engaged for the majority of the time.

Lastly, the hydraulic system uses a combination of 3 accumulators to store its hydraulic pressure. Two of these accumulators are high pressure accumulators, which store hydraulic fluid at 3,000 PSI. The accumulators use an inert gas to provide the pressure necessary. The low pressure accumulator stores the fluid at a much lower pressure, typically around 100 PSI.

Other various components are utilized in the hydraulic system, such as anti-cavitation valves and filters. In addition, there is a large hydraulic tank to store additional hydraulic fluid.

==== Linear motors ====
Due to strict laws governing oil spills in Japan, EMVs in Japan use electric linear actuators, rather than hydraulic rams, to accomplish motion.

== Similar ride systems ==
Four other similar EMV ride systems were also built for Disney theme park attractions.

- Rocket Rods, on the former PeopleMover track of Tomorrowland, Disneyland, Anaheim, California. (now dismantled)
- Test Track, in Epcot, Walt Disney World, Orlando, Florida.
- Radiator Springs Racers, in Disney California Adventure, Anaheim, California.

Both introduced additional elements to the outdoor portion of the tubular guideway - exposure to weather.

- Journey to the Center of the Earth at Tokyo DisneySea.

The technical improvements and fewer degrees of freedom in these systems distinguish them from being in the same class of EMV.

== See also ==
- Motion simulator
- Indiana Jones Adventure: Temple of the Forbidden Eye - Disneyland ride
- Dinosaur (Disney's Animal Kingdom) - identical track featuring Time Transport EMVs with a dinosaur theme
- Indiana Jones Adventure: Temple of the Crystal Skull - Tokyo DisneySea ride
- Rocket Rods
- Test Track
- Journey to the Center of the Earth (attraction)
- Indiana Jones and the Myth of the Jade Serpent - Disney's Animal Kingdom
- Incidents at Disney parks
- List of amusement rides based on film franchises
- Stewart platform
