= Decepticoaster =

Launched roller coaster in Beijing

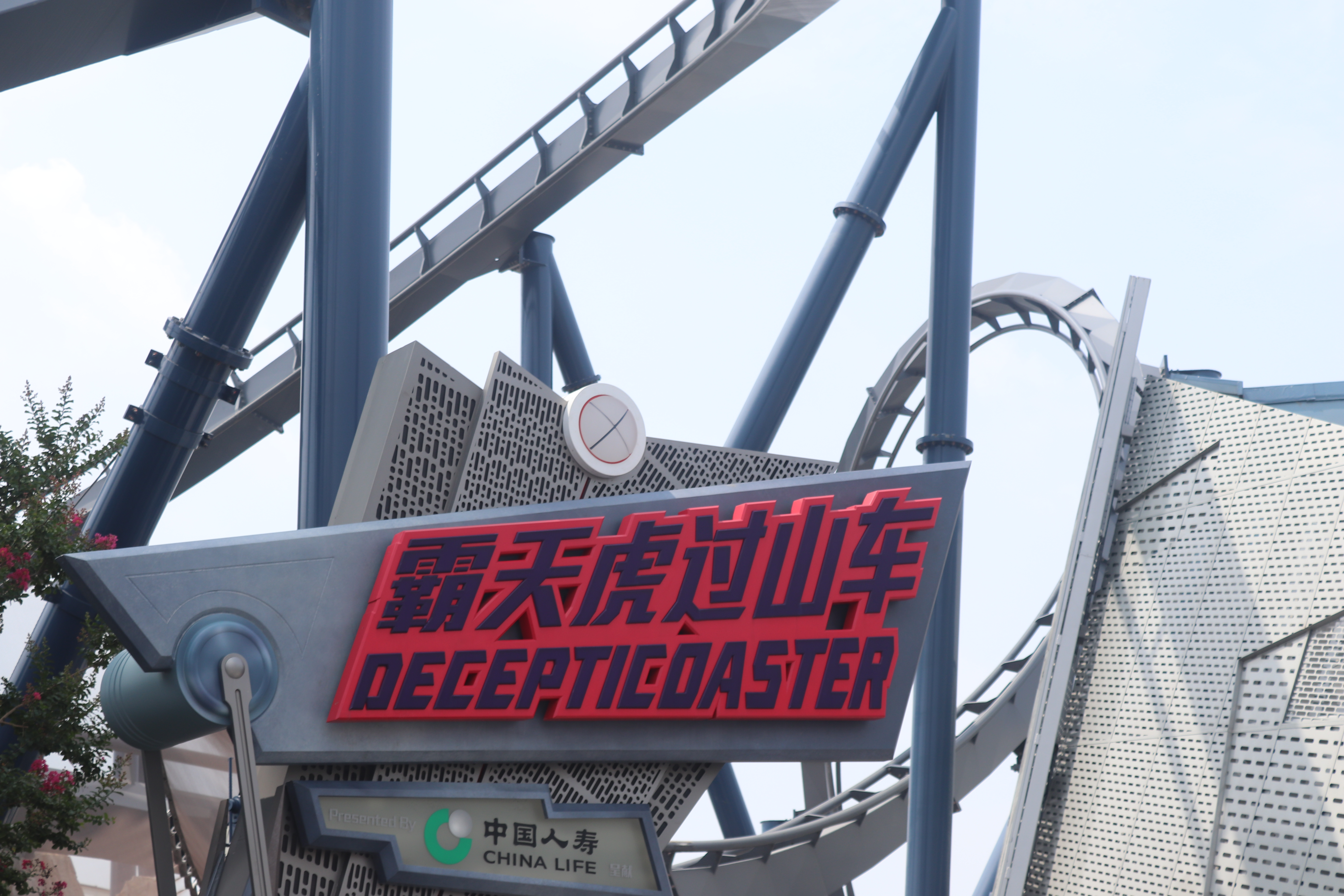

Universal Studios Beijing
- Location: Universal Studios Beijing
- Park section: Transformers: Metrobase
- Coordinates: 39.85682983°N 116.6746029°E
- Status: Operating
- Soft opening date: September 1, 2021
- Opening date: September 20, 2021

General statistics
- Type: Steel – Launched
- Manufacturer: Bolliger & Mabillard
- Designer: Werner Stengel
- Model: Sitting Coaster – Custom
- Lift/launch system: Tire Propelled Launch
- Height: 110 ft (34 m)
- Drop: 104.9 ft (32.0 m)
- Length: 3,700 ft (1,100 m)
- Speed: 67 mph (108 km/h)
- Inversions: 7
- Duration: 2:15
- Acceleration: 0 to 40 mph (0 to 64 km/h) in 2 seconds
- G-force: 4
- Height restriction: 132 cm (4 ft 4 in)
- Theme: Transformers
- Sponsor: China Life
- Decepticoaster at RCDB

The Decepticoaster (Chinese: 霸天虎过山车) is a launched roller coaster located at Universal Studios Beijing within the Universal Beijing Resort. The ride opened to the public at the park on September 20, 2021.

== History ==
On October 13, 2014, Universal Parks & Resorts CEO Thomas L. Williams announced a deal to construct a Universal Studios park in Beijing, with the park's attractions yet to be announced. In October 2020, Universal Parks & Resorts posted a video which detailed most of Universal Studios Beijing's attractions. The video confirmed the addition of the Decepticoaster, similar to The Incredible Hulk Coaster at Universal's Islands of Adventure. The roller coaster opened to the public on September 20, 2021 with the park.

== Ride experience ==
The train (the vehicle mode for an Autobot-named Coaster) launches from 0 to 40 mph (0 to 64 km/h) in 2 seconds at an upward angle through the belly of a Decepticon Driller (a tunnel with special effects and lighting). The train then enters a zero-g roll and plunges a 105-foot (32 m) drop, reaching its top speed of 67 mph (108 km/h), and then enters a cobra roll, followed by a vertical loop. The train then enters a small cave. Once exiting the cave, the train enters a corkscrew and another vertical loop before entering the mid-course brake run, descending another hill into another corkscrew and a turnaround. The train then tilts sideways as it enters a helix, which ends at the coaster's final brake run.

== See also ==
- 2021 in amusement parks
- The Incredible Hulk Coaster
