= Lost River Delta (Tokyo DisneySea) =

Themed land

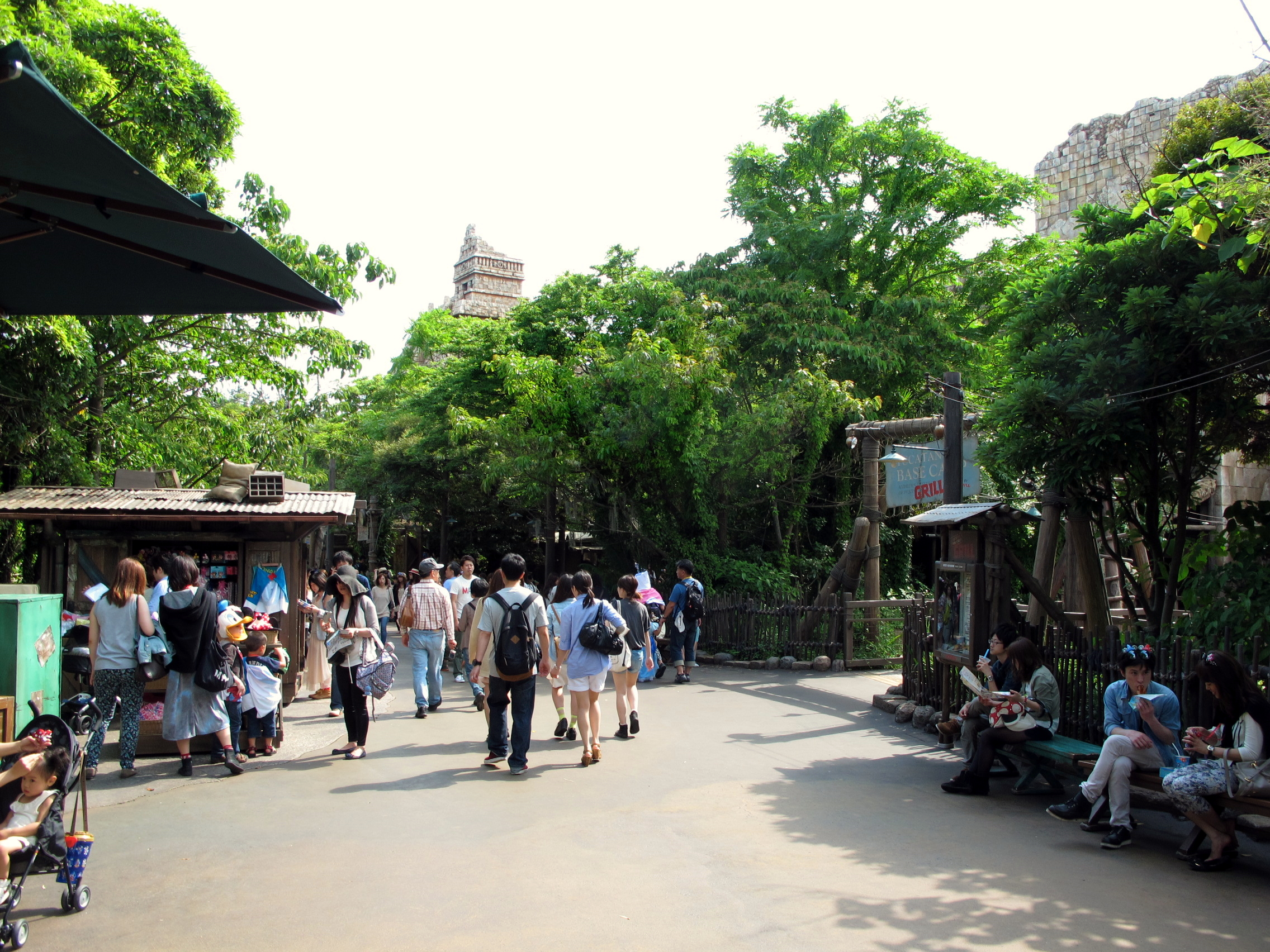
- Lost River Delta
- Interactive map of Lost River Delta
- Theme: 1930s Archaeological site

Attractions
- Total: 4
- Roller coasters: 1
- Other rides: 2
- Shows: 1

Tokyo DisneySea
- Coordinates: 35°37′36″N 139°52′53″E
- Status: Operating
- Opened: September 4, 2001

Lost River Delta is a "port-of-call" (themed land) at Tokyo DisneySea in the Tokyo Disney Resort. It presents an archaeological site in a tropical rainforest of Central America in the 1930s.

== Theme ==
Lost River Delta is the farthest "themed land" from the entrance of Tokyo DisneySea. The landmark of this area is an ancient Mesoamerican pyramid. The thrill ride Indiana Jones Adventure: Temple of the Crystal Skull, which is based on Lucasfilm's Indiana Jones film series, operates in the pyramid.

== Attractions and entertainment ==
=== Current ===
- DisneySea Transit Steamer Line
- Indiana Jones Adventure: Temple of the Crystal Skull
- Raging Spirits
- Hangar Stage
  - Dreams Take Flight

=== Former ===
- Hangar Stage
  - Mystic Rhythms (2001-2015)
  - Out of Shadowland (2016-2019)
  - Song of Mirage (2019-2020)
  - Tokyo DisneySea 20th "Shining with You" (April-September 2022)

== Restaurants and refreshments ==
- Expedition Eats
- Lost River Cookhouse
- Miguel's El Dorado Cantina
- Tropic Al's
- Yucatan Base Camp Grill

== Shopping ==
- Expedition Photo Archives
- Lookout Traders
- Lost River Outfitters
- Peddlers' Outpost
