= The Incredible Hulk Coaster =

Roller coaster at Islands of Adventure

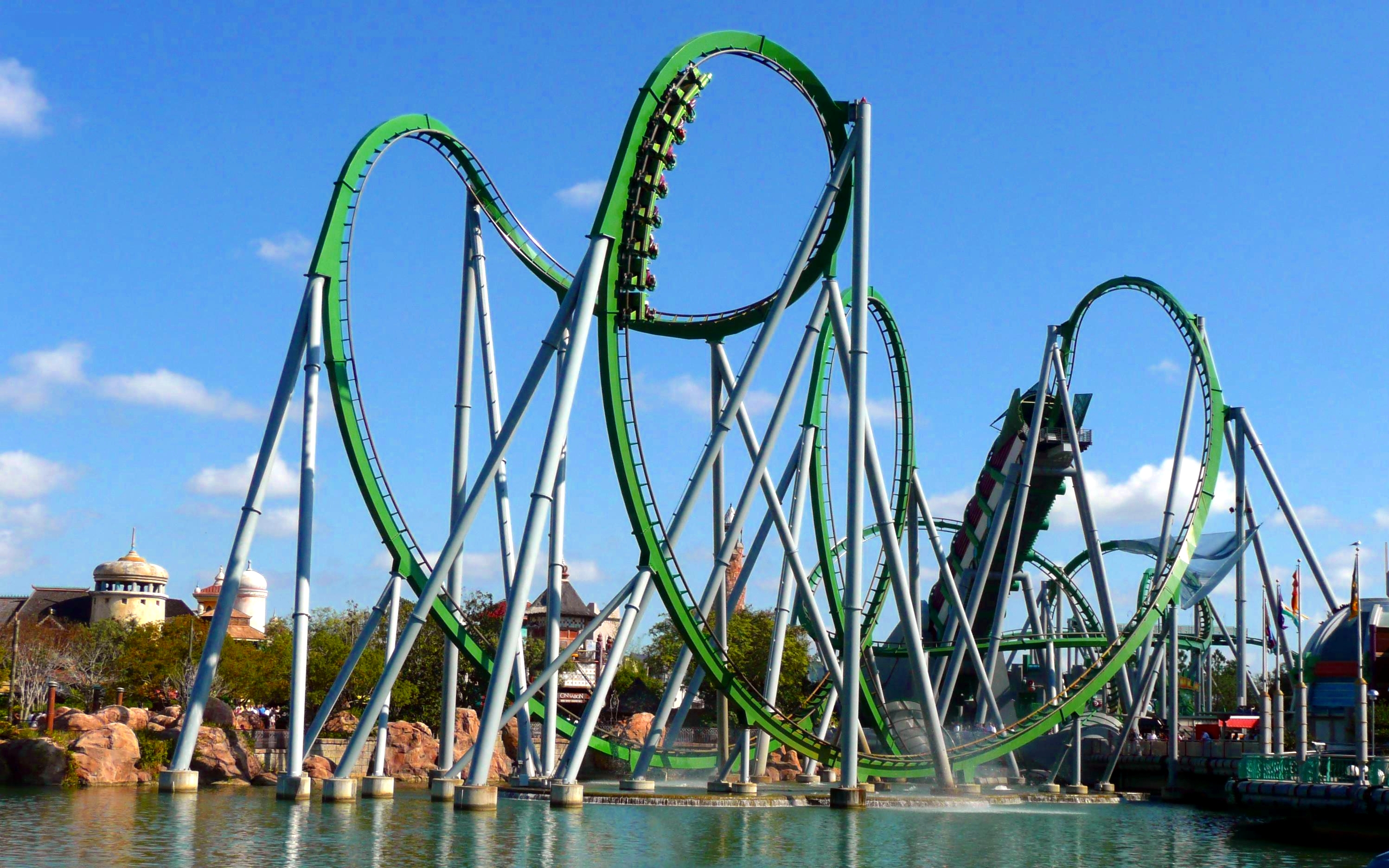
- Attraction logo (2016-present) (top); The Incredible Hulk in 2007 (bottom)

Universal Islands of Adventure
- Location: Universal Islands of Adventure
- Park section: Marvel Super Hero Island
- Coordinates: 28.471168°N 81.468424°W
- Status: Operating
- Soft opening date: March 27, 1999
- Opening date: May 28, 1999

General statistics
- Type: Steel – Launched
- Manufacturer: Bolliger & Mabillard
- Designer: Werner Stengel
- Model: Sitting Coaster – Custom
- Lift/launch system: Tire propelled launch
- Height: 110 ft (34 m)
- Drop: 104.9 ft (32.0 m)
- Length: 3,700 ft (1,100 m)
- Speed: 67 mph (108 km/h)
- Inversions: 7
- Duration: 2:15
- Capacity: 1920 riders per hour
- Acceleration: 0 to 40 mph (0 to 64 km/h) in 2 seconds
- G-force: 4
- Restraint style: Over-the-shoulder
- Height restriction: 54 in (137 cm)
- Trains: Unknown number of trains with 8 cars; riders arranged 4 across in a single row for a total of 32 riders per train
- Theme: Hulk
- Universal Express Pass available
- Single rider line available
- Must transfer from wheelchair
- The Incredible Hulk Coaster at RCDB

The Incredible Hulk Coaster is a launched roller coaster located at Universal Islands of Adventure theme park within the Universal Orlando Resort. Designed by Werner Stengel and manufactured by Bolliger & Mabillard (B&M), the roller coaster is themed after the Hulk comic book superhero and opened to the public on May 28, 1999. It is the first B&M coaster themed to a Marvel Comics superhero character and the first to feature a launch design, which was primarily implemented by Universal Creative and MTS Systems Corporation.

The launched lift hill of the Incredible Hulk Coaster accelerates riders up to 40 mph (64 km/h) in two seconds, and the coaster eventually reaches a maximum speed of 67 mph (108 km/h). It features seven inversions throughout the course of the 3,670-foot-long (1,120 m) ride, which was positively received when it opened. A major refurbishment began in September 2015, which included an updated queue line, slight theme modifications, new sections of track, and new trains that feature on-board audio. It reopened to the public on August 4, 2016.

== History ==
In 1991, planning began for a new theme park adjacent to Universal Studios Florida. By the end of 1993, it was decided that one area of the future Islands of Adventure theme park would be themed after Marvel Comics, with a Hulk theme being selected for a thrill ride. The designers of the ride wanted to simulate being fired out of a cannon and subsequently set about prototyping a launch system. Universal Creative and MTS Systems Corporation had a working prototype in January 1995. Methods to achieve this acceleration were investigated into mid-1996. On-site construction of Islands of Adventure was underway in 1997, with Superior Rigging & Erection being responsible for erecting the supports and track of the roller coaster. On May 28, 1999, Islands of Adventure officially opened to the public, with The Incredible Hulk being one of its debut attractions.

On August 14, 2015, Universal announced that the coaster would undergo major enhancement and refurbishment work. The ride closed on September 8, 2015, and re-opened to the public on August 4, 2016, after several days of technical rehearsals. The refurbishment involved heavy modifications to the line queue and entrance, along with a storyline theme. To improve the smoothness of the ride, sections of track were also replaced along with the trains, which were enhanced with on-board audio and special lighting effects. The launch tunnel's exterior was repainted black and the old track and trains were recycled for scrap.

Concept art released in 2015 for the upcoming Universal Studios Beijing showed that the park would include a clone of the Incredible Hulk Coaster. However, Universal later clarified in 2019 that the roller coaster clone, Decepticoaster, would instead be themed to the Transformers franchise.

== Characteristics ==
The Incredible Hulk is a sitting coaster by Swiss firm Bolliger & Mabillard (B&M). The 3,670-foot-long (1,120 m) ride features seven inversions including a zero-G roll, a cobra roll, two vertical loops, and two corkscrews. The ride features a maximum height of 110 feet (34 m), and a first drop stretching 105 feet (32 m). Riders reach a top speed of 67 miles per hour (108 km/h) on the two-and-a-quarter minute ride. Each of The Incredible Hulk's trains feature eight cars which seat riders four abreast, giving each train a maximum capacity of 32 riders. Riders, who must be at least 54 inches (140 cm) tall, are restrained with ratcheting over-the-shoulder restraints. This train configuration allows the ride to achieve a theoretical hourly capacity of 1,920 riders per hour. The ride features two subterranean dives, is partially built over water, and is illuminated green at night.

A unique launch system propels riders up the 110-foot-tall (34 m) hill. The system was developed by Universal Creative and MTS Systems Corporation. A prototype launch system was designed by January 1995. The prototype consisted of a series of boxcars welded together to form a launch tunnel. A track-mounted dune buggy was then propelled inside the tunnel through the use of a weight drop launch mechanism. The designers then experimented with different rates of acceleration, each emitting between one and five times the force of gravity. The final system which was implemented on The Incredible Hulk sees trains launch from 0 to 40 miles per hour (64 km/h) in 2 seconds. Riders travel at an angle of 30 degrees through a 150-foot-long (46 m) tunnel, pulling 1 G. To power this launch the designers investigated a variety of systems ranging from hydraulic, pneumatic, cable, steam catapult, and conveyor belt. In the end a drive tire system was selected, where 230 electrical motors power a set of tires that pinch the train's underside to provide propulsion. As this system required 8 megawatts (11,000 hp) of power to propel each train, the park built several customized motor generator sets with large flywheels to reduce the risk of browning-out the local energy grid with every launch. The launch system made The Incredible Hulk the only B&M ride to feature a launch, until Thunderbird opened at Holiday World in 2015. Unlike The Incredible Hulk, Thunderbird uses a linear synchronous motor (LSM) launch system.

== Ride description ==
=== 1999–2015 ===
==== Queue ====
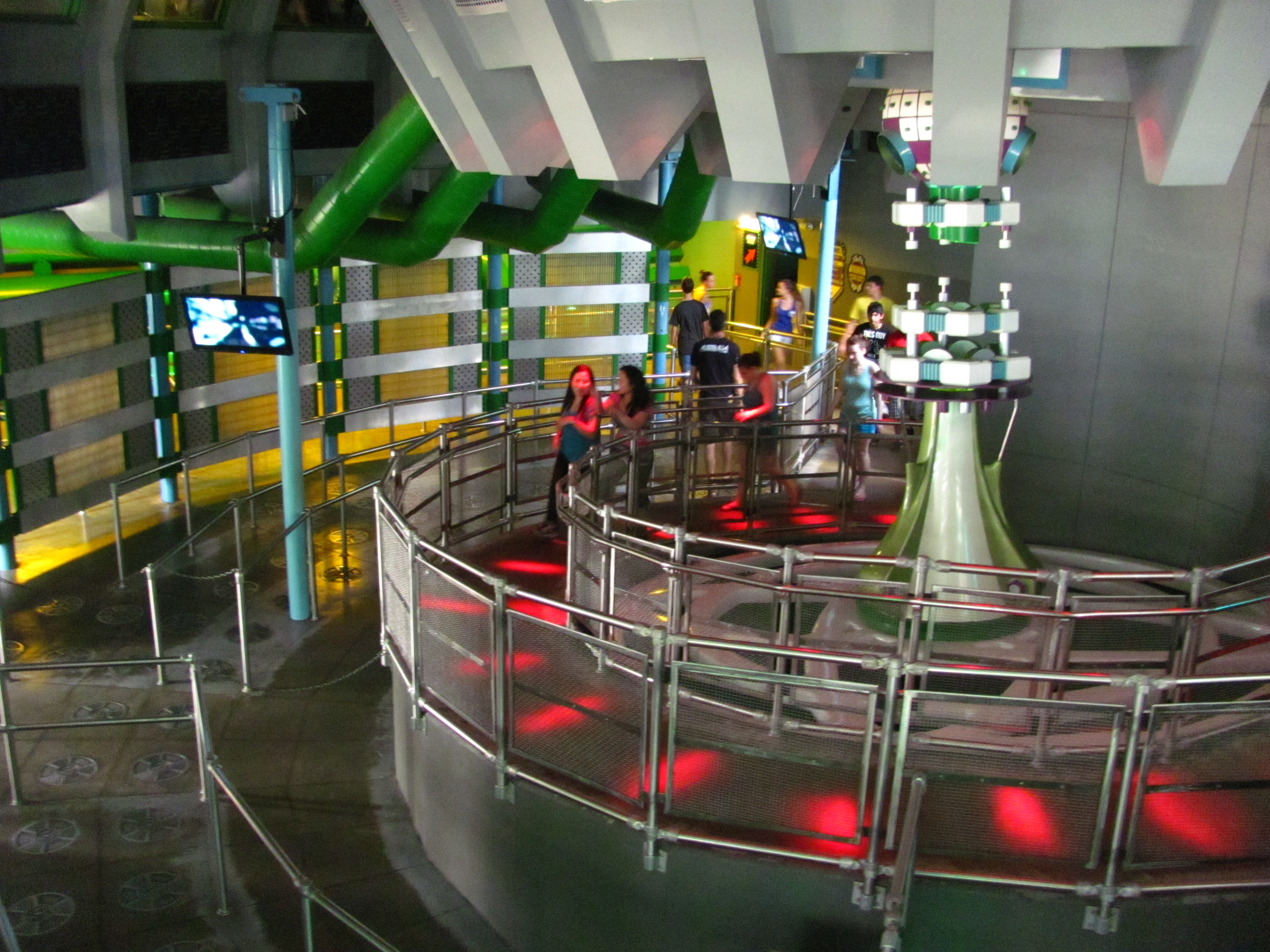
Overhead view of Hulk's themed queue prior to refurbishment

In the original version, the queue began with the science laboratory of Dr. Bruce Banner with many televisions showing a cartoon about the story of Hulk, featuring appearances from Bruce, General Thunderbolt Ross, Betty Ross Banner, and the Rhino. Bruce tried to find a way to reverse the effects of gamma mutation, which the guests were about to take part in. While walking through the lab they encountered items including the generator, the gamma core and the towers of power. Guests waiting in line were also able to see the roller coaster through large holes in the walls as well as listen to the ride as it did a number of passes.

==== Ride experience ====
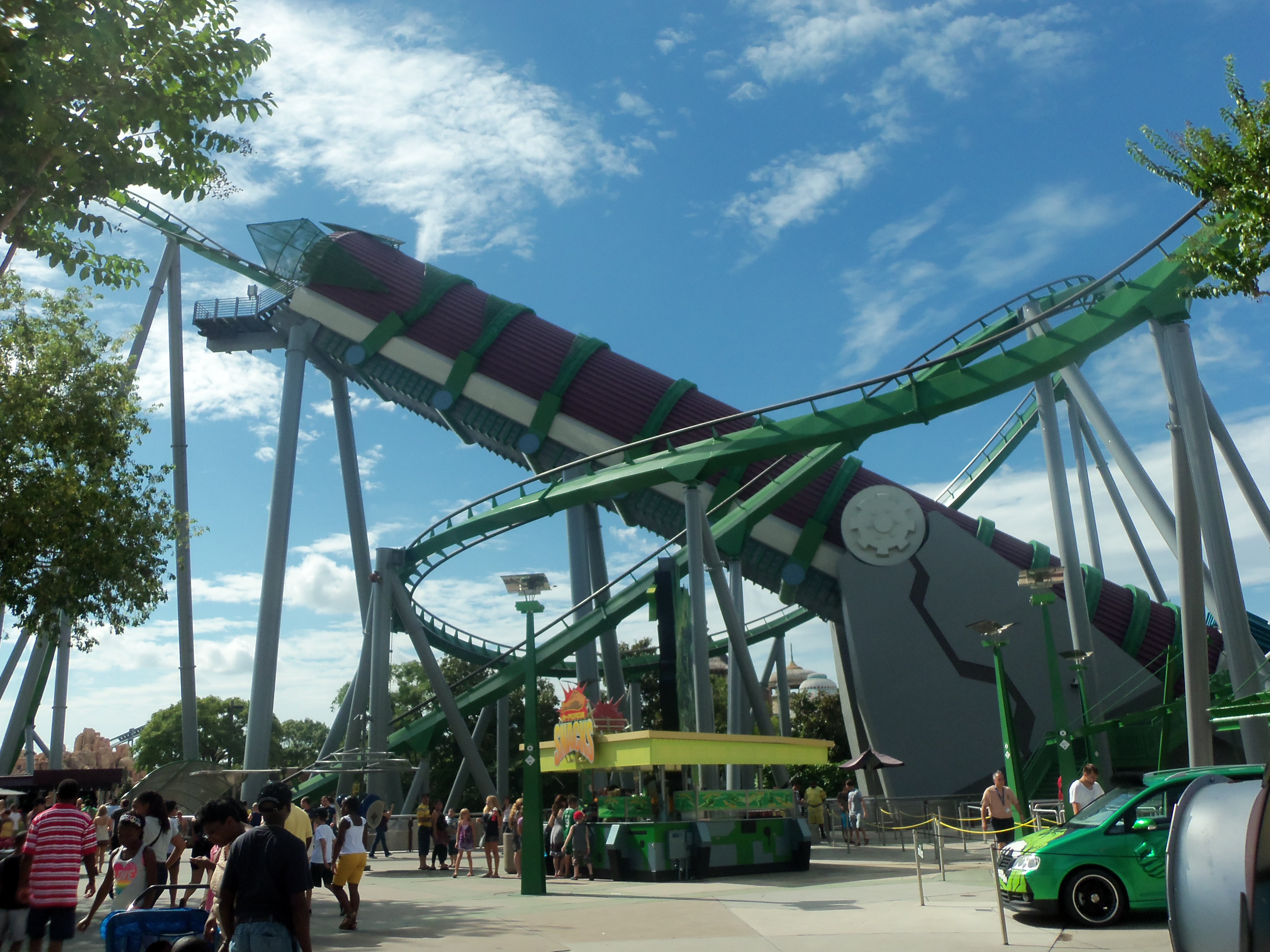
The "gamma-ray accelerator" launch tunnel, viewed from the outside

After boarding, the train moved into another area of the station themed as a gamma-ray accelerator, while a recording of Dr. Bruce Banner was played anxiously stating, "Everything looks good...I think...I think this time it's...going to work!" A female voice then exclaimed, "Warning! Coolant levels dropping!" and announced that there was a malfunction. Alarms began to go off inside the accelerator as Dr. Banner screamed in terror, "No! No! No! No!" The last "No!" was synchronized with the tire-propelled launch mechanism, which propelled the train from 0 to 40 mph (0 to 64 km/h) in 2 seconds at an upward angle exiting the station.

Immediately after exiting the tunnel, the train entered a zero-g roll inverting element and plunged down a 105-foot (32 m) drop. The train then reached a top speed of 67 miles per hour (108 km/h), followed by a cobra roll over the park's main lagoon. The train then proceeded through a vertical loop, followed by a subterranean tunnel full of mist. Upon exiting the tunnel, the track encircled the station, sending the train into a corkscrew and a second vertical loop, which wrapped around the mid-course brake run and was flanked by two over-banked turns. This led into the mid-course brake run slowing the train before descending another hill into a second corkscrew and a turn-around. The train then tilted sideways during the final stretch of track as riders passed an on-ride camera and entered a helix, which ended at the coaster's final brake run.

=== 2016–present ===
==== Queue ====
Following a major refurbishment that was completed in 2016, a new, original storyline was added with a completely redesigned queue experience that places guests inside a perilous scientific experiment led by General Thaddeus Ross. The entrance features a statue of Hulk holding one of the ride's vehicles over his head, and arching tracks passing over him. These arching coaster tracks came from the original Hulk Roller Coaster. The televisions now show CGI animations of test subjects being exposed to gamma radiation and being transformed into Hulk-like creatures. As of April 2015, riders must pass through metal detectors and security personnel and must rid themselves of all loose items from their pockets. A wheelchair accessible elevator to the ride platform is located near the exit.

==== Ride experience ====
The refurbishment added new, immersive elements such as a revamped launch tunnel and audio speakers integrated on-board each train. After walking through the queue, guests arrive at General Ross' launching platform. After boarding, the train departs the platform and enters an area themed as a gamma core. The train begins to ascend a launch tunnel, while a female voice recording announces, "Initiating Gamma Exposure. Hulk Transformation: Accelerating. Do not be afraid." Visual and audio effects portraying the reaction of a gamma accelerator are activated, as a tire-propelled launch mechanism sends riders catapulting out of the launch tunnel. Riders experience the same track layout from the original Hulk ride that was rebuilt with new track pieces. An original score composed by Patrick Stump of Fall Out Boy is played over the on-board speakers.

== Reception ==
The Incredible Hulk has been well received. In its debut year, the ride was voted the best roller coaster by Discovery Channel viewers and appeared on the Thrills, Chills and Spills documentary. Amusement Business described The Incredible Hulk as one of Islands of Adventure's two world-class roller coasters (the other being the now-dismantled Dueling Dragons, later known as Dragon Challenge). Dewayne Bevil of the Orlando Sentinel rated the ride as his eighth favorite attraction in Orlando. He states the ride is "too intense to take back-to-back trips. It rattles our nerves, in a good way." Arthur Levine of About.com gave the ride 9 out of 10 stars. Levine describes the ride as "both terrifying and exhilarating" and "not for the faint of heart".

In Amusement Today's annual Golden Ticket Awards, The Incredible Hulk was consistently ranked until 2013. It debuted at position 19 in 1999 before reaching its peak ranking of 9 in 2001.

Golden Ticket Awards: Top steel Roller Coasters
Year									1998	1999
Ranking									–	19
Year	2000	2001	2002	2003	2004	2005	2006	2007	2008	2009
Ranking	11	9	17	21	20	19	21	30	26	29
Year	2010	2011	2012	2013	2014	2015	2016	2017	2018	2019
Ranking	43	35	47	–	–	–	–	–	–	–
Year	2020	2021	2022	2023	2024	2025	2026			
Ranking	N/A	–	–	–	–	–	–			

== Incident ==
On September 23, 2003, a 34-year-old from Jensen Beach, Florida, suffered a heart attack from an unknown heart condition while riding The Incredible Hulk coaster. She was rushed to Sand Lake Hospital in critical condition, but never regained consciousness and died shortly after being taken off of life support.

== See also ==
- Decepticoaster
- Incidents at Universal parks
