= MTS Systems Corporation =

Global Supplier of Test Systems Corporation

- Company type: Subsidiary
- Traded as: Nasdaq: MTSC
- Industry: Scientific & Technical Instruments
- Founded: 1966; 60 years ago, in Eden Prairie, Minnesota
- Headquarters: Eden Prairie, Minnesota
- Products: Testing hardware, Sensing hardware
- Revenue: ▲$778.032 million USD (2019)
- Operating income: ▲$65.172 million USD (2019)
- Net income: ▲$61.328 million USD (2019)
- Total assets: ▲1.139 billion USD (2019)
- Number of employees: 3,500
- Parent: Illinois Tool Works
- Website: www.mts.com

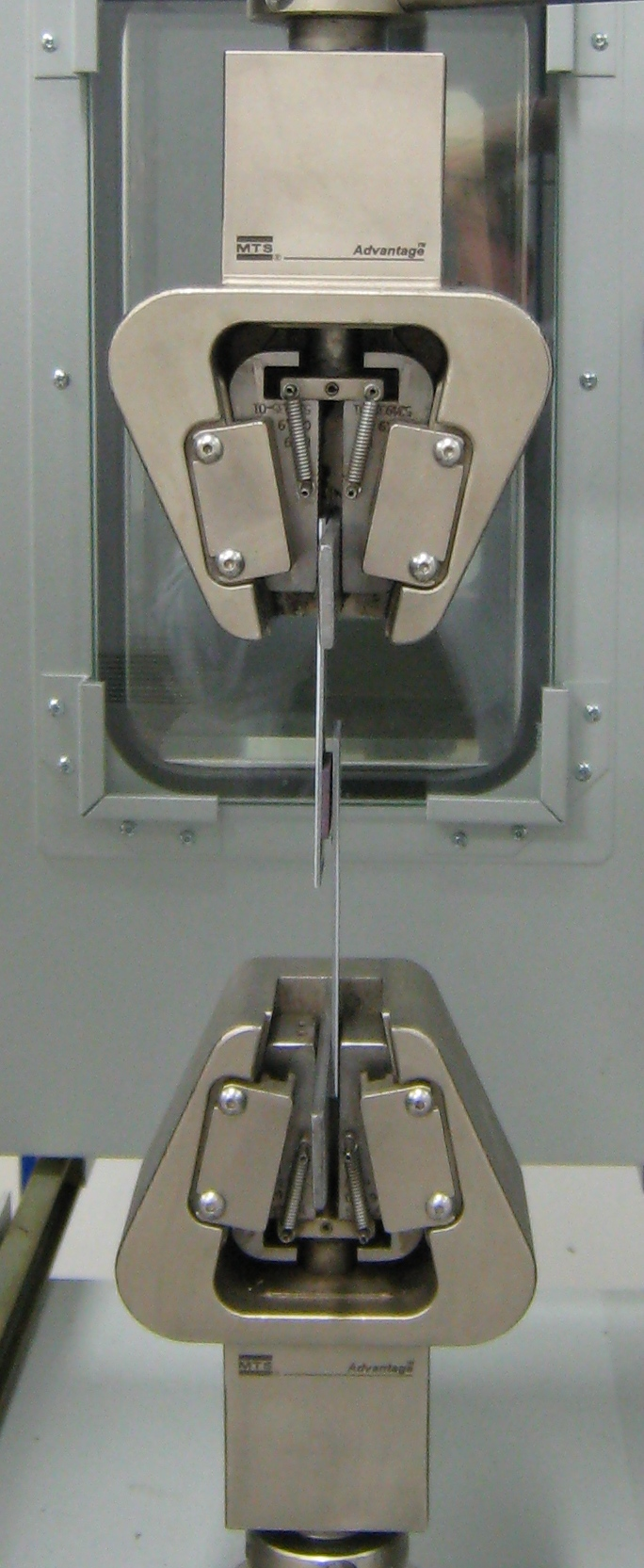
Self-tight jaws by MTS

MTS Systems Corporation (MTS) is a supplier of test and simulation systems. The company provides test and measurement products to determine the performance and reliability of vehicles, aircraft, civil structures, biomedical materials and devices and raw materials. Examples of MTS products include: aerodynamics simulators, seismic simulators, road simulators, load frames, and hydraulic actuators.

In December 2020, Amphenol Corporation announced it had reached an agreement to acquire MTS in an acquisition completed on April 7, 2021. In January 2021, ITW announced it had in turn reached an agreement to acquire the test and simulation business of MTS from Amphenol.

== Notable Projects ==
- Custom built Flat Trac LTRe for the National Tire Research Center in Alton, VA, which displays "...some of the most advanced technology in tire testing and research."
- State-of-the-art 360-degree driving simulator. Commonly referred to as "The World's Most Advanced Driving Simulator"
- First of its kind tuned mass damper for Citigroup Center in New York City and John Hancock Tower in Boston.
- Designed the AWD Slot-Car ride system for Walt Disney Imagineering’s Enhanced motion vehicle ride system.
- Manufacturing and design for Universal Parks & Resorts, including the launch system for the Incredible Hulk Coaster; the ride systems for The Cat in the Hat and Men in Black: Alien Attack at Universal Orlando, Jaws at Universal Studios Japan; as well as the dinosaurs at Islands of Adventure's Jurassic Park River Adventure.
